= Radio Disney Music Award for Best Anthem =

Annual US music award

The following is a list of Radio Disney Music Award winners and nominees for Best Anthem.

== Winners and nominees ==
=== 2000s ===
Year	Winner	Nominees	Ref.
2001	Unrealized		
2002	Unrealized		
2003	Unrealized		
2004	Unrealized		
2005	Unrealized		
2006	We're All in This Together" – High School Musical Cast	"Get'cha Head In The Game" – B5; "U Can’t Touch This" – MC Hammer; "We Are the Champions" – Crazy Frog	
2007	"Fabulous" – Ashley Tisdale and Lucas Grabeel	"Makes Me Happy" – Drake Bell; "SOS" – Jonas Brothers; "You Are the Music in Me" – Vanessa Hudgens, Zac Efron and Olesya Rulin	

=== 2010s ===
Year	Winner	Nominees	Ref.
2013	Unrealized		
2014	Unrealized		
2015	Unrealized		
2016	"Eyes Wide Open" - Sabrina Carpenter	"Cake by the Ocean" - DNCE; "Confident" - Demi Lovato; "Honey, I'm Good." - Andy Grammer	
2017	Unrealized		
