= List of awards and nominations received by Lindsay Lohan =

Lindsay Lohan awards and nominations
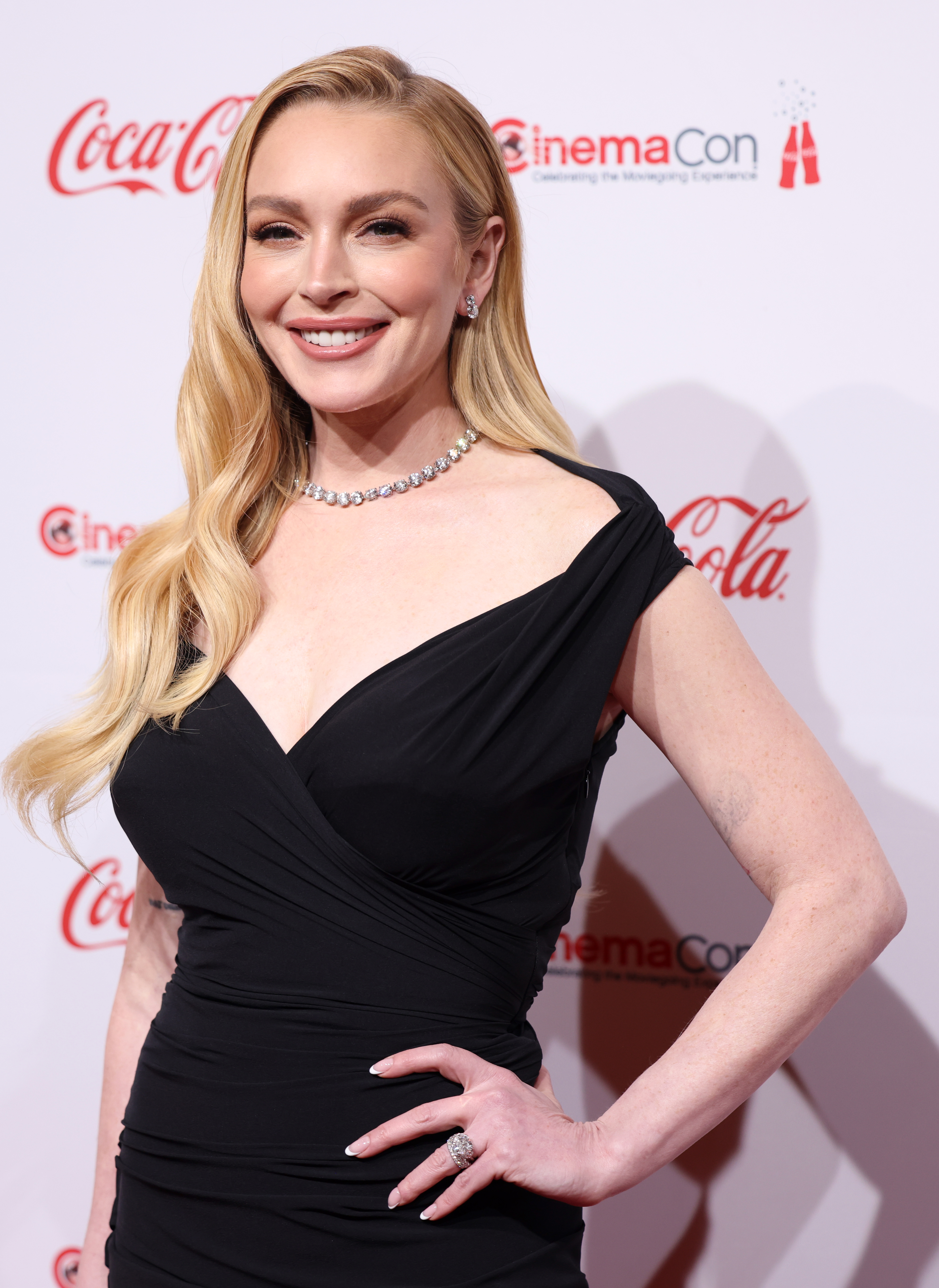
- Lohan in 2025
Awards and nominations
Award	Wins	Nominations
Actor Awards	0	1
Critics' Choice Awards	0	3
Gotham Awards	0	1
MTV Movie Awards	3	4
MTV Video Music Awards	0	1
Saturn Awards	0	1
Teen Choice Awards	4	15

Totals (Note: Certain award groups do not simply award one winner. They acknowledge several different recipients, have runners-up, and have third place. Since this is a specific recognition and is different from losing an award, runner-up mentions are considered wins in this award tally. For simplification and to avoid errors, each award in this list has been presumed to have had a prior nomination.)
- Wins: 34
- Nominations: 118

Lindsay Lohan is an American actress and singer who has received various accolades throughout her career. She made her motion picture debut starring as twins in the 1998 family comedy The Parent Trap, which earned her acclaim and a Young Artist Award. She continued working with Disney into her teens, including in Freaky Friday (2003), for which she received an MTV Movie Award for Best Breakthrough Performance, two Teen Choice Awards, and a Saturn Award nomination.

In 2004, she starred in Confessions of a Teenage Drama Queen and Mean Girls, with the latter role as Cady Heron earning her further acclaim, an MTV Movie Award for Best Female Performance, another three Teen Choice Awards, and a nomination for Best Young Performer at the Critics' Choice Awards. Having begun showcasing her singing through acting roles as well as recording songs for movie soundtracks, Lohan launched a music career with the release of her debut studio album Speak in 2004, led by the single "Rumors," which earned her a Best Pop Video nomination at the MTV Video Music Awards.

While she continued her relationship with Disney in her late teens, with Herbie: Fully Loaded (2005) earning her a Kids' Choice Award for Favorite Movie Actress, she began focusing on more dramatic roles as part of ensemble casts. The Robert Altman-directed independent musical comedy A Prairie Home Companion (2006) and the Emilio Estevez-directed drama Bobby (2006) earned her multiple nominations, including at the Critics' Choice Movie Award for Best Acting Ensemble, the Gotham Independent Film Award for Best Ensemble Cast, and the Actor Award for Outstanding Performance by a Cast in a Motion Picture.

The following decade saw Lohan largely focusing on her personal life and exploring other creative ventures. She moved to London, where she made her stage debut in the West End in 2014's Speed-the-Plow, earning a nomination in the Theatre Actress category at the Glamour Women of the Year Awards and the Comeback Award at the Ischia Global Film & Music Festival. In the early 2020s, she signed a deal with Netflix to star in her first major productions in over a decade. In 2025, she returned to Disney for the legacy sequel Freakier Friday and won the CinemaCon Vanguard Award for her contributions to the entertainment industry.

== Awards and nominations ==
Name of the organization, year presented, category, nominated work and result
Organizations (Note: Awards, festivals, honors and other miscellaneous organizations are listed in alphabetical order.)	Year (Note: Indicates the year of ceremony. Each year is linked to the article about the awards held that year, wherever possible.)	Category	Work	Result	Ref.
Actor Awards	2007	Outstanding Performance by a Cast in a Motion Picture	Bobby	Nominated (Note: Shared with the cast.)	
Blockbuster Entertainment Awards	1999	Favorite Female Newcomer	The Parent Trap	Nominated	
Capri Hollywood International Film Festival	2007	Global Film Achievement	Lindsay Lohan	Won	
CinemaCon Big Screen Achievement Awards	2025	CinemaCon Vanguard Award	Lindsay Lohan	Won	
Critics' Choice Awards	2005	Best Young Actress	Mean Girls	Nominated	
Critics' Choice Awards	2007	Best Acting Ensemble	Bobby	Nominated	
Critics' Choice Awards	2007	Best Acting Ensemble	A Prairie Home Companion	Nominated	
Diversity Awards	2004	Female Nova Award	Lindsay Lohan	Won	
Glamour Women of the Year Awards	2015	Theatre Actress	Speed-the-Plow	Nominated	
Gold Derby Awards	2007	Film Ensemble	A Prairie Home Companion	Nominated	
Golden Raspberry Awards	2007	Worst Actress	Just My Luck	Nominated	
Golden Raspberry Awards	2008	Worst Actress	I Know Who Killed Me	Won	
Golden Raspberry Awards	2008	Worst Screen Combo	I Know Who Killed Me	Won	
Golden Raspberry Awards	2014	Worst Screen Combo	Scary Movie 5	Nominated (Note: Shared with Charlie Sheen.)	
Golden Raspberry Awards	2014	Worst Supporting Actress	Scary Movie 5	Nominated	
Golden Raspberry Awards	2014	Worst Actress	The Canyons	Nominated	
Golden Schmoes Awards	2004	Best T&A of the Year	Mean Girls	Nominated	
Gotham Awards	2006	Best Ensemble Cast	A Prairie Home Companion	Nominated	
GQ Men of the Year Awards	2006	Obsession of the Year	Lindsay Lohan	Won	
GR8! Women Awards	2017	Versatile Artistry & Social Service	Lindsay Lohan	Won	
Grindr Unwrapped Awards	2022	Best Acting	Falling for Christmas	Nominated	
Grindr Unwrapped Awards	2025	Comeback Queen	Lindsay Lohan	Nominated	
Grindr Unwrapped Awards	2025	Press Tour of the Year	Freakier Friday	Nominated	
Hollywood Film Festival	2006	Ensemble Award	Bobby	Won	
Hollywood Film Festival	2006	Breakthrough Acting Award	Bobby	Won	
International Online Cinema Awards	2005	Best Breakthrough	Mean Girls	Nominated	
Ischia Global Film & Music Festival	2014	Ischia Comeback Award	Speed-the-Plow	Won	
Melbourne Underground Film Festival	2013	Best Female Actor	The Canyons	Won	
Melbourne Underground Film Festival	2013	Best Foreign Film	The Canyons	Won (Note: Shared with the producers.)	
MTV Asia Awards	2006	Favorite Female Artist	Lindsay Lohan	Nominated	
MTV MIAW Awards Brazil	2019	Best Comeback	Lindsay Lohan	Nominated	
MTV Movie & TV Awards	2004	Breakthrough Female Performance	Freaky Friday	Won	
MTV Movie & TV Awards	2005	Best Female Performance	Mean Girls	Won	
MTV Movie & TV Awards	2005	Best On-Screen Team	Mean Girls	Won (Note: Shared with Rachel McAdams, Lacey Chabert, and Amanda Seyfried.)	
MTV Movie & TV Awards	2019	Best Meme-able Moment	Lindsay Lohan's Beach Club	Nominated	
MTV Video Music Awards	2005	Best Pop Video	"Rumors"	Nominated	
Much Viewers' Poll	2005	Favourite Much Guest	Lindsay Lohan	Nominated	
Much Viewers' Poll	2005	Hottest Action Sequence	Mean Girls	Won (Note: Shared with Rachel McAdams.)	
Much Viewers' Poll	2005	Most Drool-worthy Female	Lindsay Lohan	Nominated	
Much Viewers' Poll	2005	Most Gossip-worthy	Lindsay Lohan	Nominated	
MVPA Awards	2005	Best Colorist/Telecine	"Rumors"	Nominated	
MVPA Awards	2005	Best Make-up	"Rumors"	Nominated	
National Film & TV Awards	2019	Best Reality TV Show	Lindsay Lohan's Beach Club	Nominated	
Nickelodeon Australian Kids' Choice Awards	2005	Fave Movie Star	Mean Girls	Nominated	
Nickelodeon Australian Kids' Choice Awards	2006	Fave Movie Star Female	Herbie: Fully Loaded	Nominated	
Nickelodeon Kids' Choice Awards	2005	Favorite Movie Actress	Mean Girls	Nominated	
Nickelodeon Kids' Choice Awards	2006	Favorite Movie Actress	Herbie: Fully Loaded	Won	
Nickelodeon Kids' Choice Awards	2026	Favorite On-Screen Duo/Trio	Freakier Friday	Nominated (Note: Shared with Jamie Lee Curtis.)	
Online Film & Television Association	1999	Best Family Actress	The Parent Trap	Nominated	
Online Film & Television Association	1999	Best Breakthrough Female Performance	The Parent Trap	Won	
Online Film & Television Association	1999	Best Youth Performance	The Parent Trap	Nominated	
Online Film & Television Association	2005	Best Youth Performance	Mean Girls	Nominated	
Online Film & Television Association	2007	Best Music – Adapted Song	"Frankie and Johnny"	Nominated	
Premiere Women in Hollywood Awards	2005	Chanel Spotlight Award for Emerging Talent	Lindsay Lohan	Won	
Prism Awards	2008	Best Feature Film	Georgia Rule	Won	
Radio Disney Music Awards	2003	Best Song to Dance	"Ultimate"	Nominated	
Radio Disney Music Awards	2003	Best Song to Air Guitar	"Ultimate"	Nominated	
Radio Disney Music Awards	2003	Female with Most Style	Lindsay Lohan	Nominated	
Radio Disney Music Awards	2003	Best New Artist	Lindsay Lohan	Nominated	
Radio Disney Music Awards	2004	Best Song to Watch Your Dad Sing	"Drama Queen (That Girl)"	Won	
Radio Disney Music Awards	2004	Best TV Movie Song	"Drama Queen (That Girl)"	Nominated	
Radio Disney Music Awards	2004	Female with Most Style	Lindsay Lohan	Nominated	
Radio Disney Music Awards	2004	Best Female Artist	Lindsay Lohan	Nominated	
Radio Disney Music Awards	2004	Best Actress Turned Singer	Lindsay Lohan	Nominated	
Radio Disney Music Awards	2005	Best Song	"Rumors"	Nominated	
Radio Disney Music Awards	2005	Best Song to Listen to on the Way to School	"Rumors"	Nominated	
Radio Disney Music Awards	2005	Best Soundtrack Song	"First"	Nominated	
Radio Disney Music Awards	2005	Female with Most Style	Lindsay Lohan	Nominated	
Radio Disney Music Awards	2005	Best Female Artist	Lindsay Lohan	Nominated	
Radio Disney Music Awards	2006	Best True Ringer Ring Tone	"Confessions of a Broken Heart (Daughter to Father)"	Nominated	
Radio Disney Music Awards	2006	Best Song to Play While Doing Homework	"Confessions of a Broken Heart (Daughter to Father)"	Nominated	
Radio Disney Music Awards	2006	Best Song You've Heard a Million Times and Still Love	"Confessions of a Broken Heart (Daughter to Father)"	Nominated	
Radio Disney Music Awards	2006	Best Song to Put on Repeat	"Confessions of a Broken Heart (Daughter to Father)"	Nominated	
Roshni Media TIA Awards	2018	Inspirational Woman Award	Lindsay Lohan	Won	
Saturn Awards	2004	Best Performance by a Younger Actor	Freaky Friday	Nominated	
Shorty Awards	2013	Best Actress	Lindsay Lohan	Nominated	
Shorty Awards	2025	Earned Media	Tea Break with Lindsay Lohan	Nominated	
Shorty Awards	2025	Food & Beverage	Tea Break with Lindsay Lohan	Nominated	
Shorty Awards	2025	Medium-Length Video	Tea Break with Lindsay Lohan	Nominated	
Shorty Awards	2025	Medium-Length Video	The Style Swap	Nominated	
Smash Hits Poll Winners Party	2004	Best Movie Star	Lindsay Lohan	Nominated	
Smash Hits Poll Winners Party	2005	Best Movie Star	Lindsay Lohan	Nominated	
Smash Hits Poll Winners Party	2005	Party Animal of the Year	Lindsay Lohan	Nominated	
Smash Hits Poll Winners Party	2005	Most Fanciable Female	Lindsay Lohan	Nominated	
Sohu Fashion Achievement Awards	2014	Fashion Idol of the Year	Lindsay Lohan	Won	
Teen Choice Awards	2004	Choice Movie Hissy Fit	Freaky Friday	Won	
Teen Choice Awards	2004	Choice Breakout Movie Actress	Freaky Friday / Confessions of a Teenage Drama Queen / Mean Girls	Won	
Teen Choice Awards	2004	Choice Movie Chemistry	Mean Girls	Nominated (Note: Shared with Jonathan Bennett.)	
Teen Choice Awards	2004	Choice Movie Fight	Mean Girls	Nominated	
Teen Choice Awards	2004	Choice Movie Liar	Mean Girls	Nominated	
Teen Choice Awards	2004	Choice Movie Blush	Mean Girls	Won	
Teen Choice Awards	2004	Choice Comedy Movie Actress	Mean Girls	Won	
Teen Choice Awards	2005	Choice Female Hottie	Lindsay Lohan	Nominated	
Teen Choice Awards	2005	Choice Comedy Movie Actress	Herbie: Fully Loaded	Nominated	
Teen Choice Awards	2005	Choice Crossover Artist	Lindsay Lohan	Nominated	
Teen Choice Awards	2005	Choice Female Breakout Music Artist	Lindsay Lohan	Nominated	
Teen Choice Awards	2006	Choice Movie Hissy Fit	Just My Luck	Nominated	
Teen Choice Awards	2006	Choice Comedy Movie Actress	Just My Luck	Nominated	
Teen Choice Awards	2007	Choice Drama Movie Actress	Bobby / Georgia Rule	Nominated	
Teen Choice Awards	2007	Choice OMG! Moment	Lindsay Lohan	Nominated	
Thirst Project	2020	Pioneering Spirit Award	Mean Girls / #MeanGirlsDoGood	Won	
TRL Awards	2004	Best Guest Host	Lindsay Lohan	Won	
TRL Awards	2004	Fake ID (Best Artist Under 21)	Lindsay Lohan	Nominated	
TRL Awards	2005	First Lady	Lindsay Lohan	Won	
TRL Awards	2005	Fake ID (Best Artist Under 21)	Lindsay Lohan	Nominated	
TRL Awards	2005	Best Guest Host	Lindsay Lohan	Nominated	
TRL Awards	2006	Fake ID (Best Artist Under 21)	Lindsay Lohan	Nominated	
VH1 Big In Awards	2005	Big It Girl	Lindsay Lohan	Won	
VH1 Big In Awards	2005	Big Feud	Lindsay Lohan vs. Paparazzi	Nominated	
Webby Awards	2010	Best Viral Video (Online Film & Video)	Lindsay Lohan's eHarmony Profile	Nominated	
Webby Awards	2024	Best Social Campaign (Food & Drink)	Pilk and Cookies	Honoree	
Webby Awards	2025	Best Social Campaign (Arts, Culture & Lifestyle)	Bustle: Lindsay Lohan Is Back!	Nominated	
Webby Awards	2025	Best Use of Earned Media	Tea Break with Lindsay Lohan	Honoree	
WOWIE Awards	2018	Best Viral Moment	Lindsay Lohan	Won	
Young Artist Awards	1999	Best Leading Young Actress in a Feature Film	The Parent Trap	Won	
Young Artist Awards	2004	Best Leading Young Actress in a Feature Film	Freaky Friday	Nominated	
Young Hollywood Awards	2005	Today's Superstar Award	Lindsay Lohan	Won	
YoungStar Awards	1998	Best Performance by a Young Actress in a Comedy Film	The Parent Trap	Nominated	

== Other accolades ==
=== Honors and tributes ===
Other honors and tributes for Lohan
Country	Year	Description	Ref.
United States	2004	Inducted into the Young Hollywood Hall of Fame	
United States	2006	Madame Tussauds (wax figures)	
United States	2012	Madame Tussauds (wax figures)	

=== Listicles ===
Name of publisher, name of listicle, year(s) listed, and placement result
Publisher	Listicle	Year	Result	Ref.
Alternative Press	21 Best Fictional Bands from TV, Movies, and Beyond	2023	Placed (Freaky Friday)	
AOL	Top Person Under 21	2004	1st	
Ask	Top Picture Searches	2005	1st	
Billboard	Top Billboard 200 Albums of the Year	2005	62nd (Speak)	
Billboard	Hot Dance Club Play Tracks of the Year	2008	16th ("Bossy")	
Billboard	The 100 Greatest Disneyverse Songs of All Time	2023	89th ("Ultimate")	
Business Insider	The Most Popular Teen Idols Throughout History	2019	Placed	
Business Insider	The Best Fictional Musicians and Bands in Movie and TV History	2023	Placed (Freaky Friday)	
Entertainment Weekly	Annual Must List	2004	15th	
Entertainment Weekly	Influential List	2004	Placed	
Entertainment Weekly	Breakout Stars	2004	Placed	
Entertainment Weekly	Great Performances	2004	Placed (Mean Girls)	
Forbes	Celebrity 100	2004	97th	
Forbes	Celebrity 100	2005	52nd	
Forbes	Young Hollywood's Top-Earning Stars	2007	3rd	
Grammy	A History of Casablanca Records in 10 Songs	2023	Placed ("Rumors")	
The Hollywood Reporter	Female Breakout Performers	2004	2nd	
The Hollywood Reporter	93 Years of THR: Memorable Moments from a Storied History	2023	Placed (Freaky Friday)	
IMDb	Top Female Star	2004	1st	
Letterboxd	Multiplicity: Best Dual Performances in Film	2025	5th (The Parent Trap)	
Maxim	Maxim Hot 100	2007	1st	
Maxim	Maxim Hottest Hot 100	2025	Placed	
New York	The Culturati 50	2025	Placed	
The New York Times	The 2025 Faces	2025	Placed	
The New Yorker	The Best Movie Performances of the Century So Far	2021	11th (Mean Girls)	
The Observer	The Faces of the Year	2014	Placed	
People	Most Beautiful People	2004	Placed	
People	Most Beautiful People	2005	Placed	
People	Top Fashion Icons	2005	Placed	
People	Most Beautiful People	2006	Placed	
People	Most Beautiful People	2024	Placed	
Rolling Stone	Annual Hot List	2004	Placed	
Rolling Stone	People of the Year	2004	Placed	
Rolling Stone	The Millennial 100	2018	32nd	
Saturday Night Network	SNL's Greatest Hosts	2024	23rd	
Spin	Hottest Stars Under 25	2006	Placed	
The Sydney Morning Herald	The Best Twin Roles On Screen	2026	Placed (The Parent Trap)	
TC Candler	The 100 Most Beautiful Faces	2004	1st	
Teen People	What's Next in New Talent	2004	Placed	
Teen People	25 Hottest Stars Under 25	2004	Placed	
Teen People	25 Hottest Stars Under 25	2005	Placed	
Teen People	Power List	2005	2nd	
Teen People	25 Hottest Stars Under 25	2006	Placed	
Teen People	The 10 Most Beautiful Stars	2006	1st	
Variety	20 Best Fictional Bands in Movies and TV Shows	2023	Placed (Freaky Friday)	
VH1	30 Under 30: Hollywood's Next Generation	2005	Placed	
VH1	100 Greatest Teen Stars	2006	11th	
