= Radio Disney Music Award for Best Soundtrack Song =

Annual US music award

The following is a list of Radio Disney Music Award winners and nominees for Best Soundtrack Song (also known as Best TV Movie Song, Best Song From a Movie and Favorite Song from a Movie or TV Show).

== Winners and nominees ==
=== 2000s ===
| Year | Winner | Nominees | Ref. |
|---|---|---|---|
| 2001 | "I Can't Wait" – Hilary Duff | "It's Raining Men" – Geri Halliwell; "Little Bitty Pretty One" – Aaron Carter | |
| 2002 | Unrealized | | |
| 2003 | Unrealized | | |
| 2004 | "Cinderella" – Cheetah Girls | "What Dreams Are Made Of" – Hilary Duff; Drama Queen (That Girl)" – Lindsay Lohan | |
| 2005 | "Shake a Tail Feather" – Cheetah Girls | First" – Lindsay Lohan; Fly" – Hilary Duff | |
| 2006 | "Life Is a Highway" – Rascal Flatts | We're All in This Together" – High School Musical Cast; "Breaking Free" – Vanessa Hudgens and Zac Efron; "Bop to the Top" – Ashley Tisdale and Lucas Grabeel | |
| 2007 | "Gotta Go My Own Way" – Vanessa Hudgens and Zac Efron | "Push It to the Limit" – Corbin Bleu; "What Time Is It?" – High School Musical 2 cast; "Without Love" – Amanda Bynes | |

=== 2010s ===
| Year | Winner | Nominees | Ref. |
|---|---|---|---|
| 2013 | Unrealized | | |
| 2014 | "Let It Go" - Idina Menzel | "Crusin' For a Brusin'" - Ross Lynch; "Ooh La La" - Britney Spears | |
| 2015 | Unrealized | | |
| 2016 | Unrealized | | |
