= Radio Disney Music Award for Best Music Group =

Annual US music award

The following is a list of Radio Disney Music Award winners and nominees for Best Music Group. There is also a Best Band Category.

== Winners and nominees ==
=== 2000s ===
Year	Winner	Nominees	Ref.
2001	Backstreet Boys	*NSYNC; Play	
2002	Unrealized		
2003	Destiny’s Child	Atomic Kitten; The Cheetah Girls	
2004	Black Eyed Peas	Maroon 5; The Cheetah Girls	
2005	Unrealized		
2006	The Cheetah Girls	Aly & AJ; Jonas Brothers; B5	
2007	Jonas Brothers	Aly & AJ; Everlife; The Cheetah Girls	

=== 2010s ===
Year	Winner	Nominees	Ref.
2013	One Direction	IM5; Mindless Behavior; R5	
2014	One Direction	Emblem3; R5	
2015	Fifth Harmony	One Direction; 5 Seconds of Summer	
2016	Fifth Harmony	Fall Out Boy; One Direction; R5	
2017	Fifth Harmony	DNCE; One Direction; The Chainsmokers; Twenty One Pilots	
2018	BTS	Clean Bandit; Echosmith; Imagine Dragons; Maroon 5	

== Performers with multiple wins ==
3 wins

- Fifth Harmony (consecutive)

2 wins

- One Direction (consecutive)

== Performers with multiple nominations ==
5 nominations

- One Direction

4 nominations

- The Cheetah Girls

3 nominations

- Fifth Harmony
- R5

2 nominations

- Aly & AJ
- Jonas Brothers
- Maroon 5
