= Radio Disney Music Award for Best Music Video =

Annual US music award

The following is a list of Radio Disney Music Award winners and nominees for Best Music Video (formerly Video That Rocks).

== Winners and nominees ==
=== 2000s ===
Year	Winner	Nominees	Ref.
2001	Unrealized		
2002	Unrealized		
2003	"So Yesterday" – Hilary Duff	"Sk8er Boi" – Avril Lavigne; "Miss Independent" – Kelly Clarkson	
2004	"Leave (Get Out)" – JoJo	"Breakaway" – Kelly Clarkson; "Come Clean" – Hilary Duff	
2005	Unrealized		
2006	"Come Back to Me" – Vanessa Hudgens	"Year 3000" – Jonas Brothers; "The Best of Both Worlds" – Miley Cyrus; "Chemicals React" – Aly & AJ	
2007	"Stranger" – Hilary Duff	"Girlfriend" – Avril Lavigne; "He Said She Said" – Ashley Tisdale; "Say OK" – Vanessa Hudgens	

=== 2010s ===
Year	Winner	Nominees	Ref.
2013	"Heard It on the Radio" – Ross Lynch	"Ready or Not" - Bridgit Mendler; "Fashion Is My Kryptonite" – Zendaya and Bella Thorne; "Holla At The DJ" – Coco Jones	
2014	Unrealized		
2015	Unrealized		
2016	Unrealized		
