= Radio Disney Music Award for Most Talked About Artist =

Annual US music award

The following is a list of Radio Disney Music Award winners and nominees for Most Talked About Artist.

== Winners and nominees ==
=== 2000s ===
Year	Winner	Nominees	Ref.
2001	Amanda Bynes	Andrew Lawrence; Hilary Duff	
2002	Unrealized		
2003	Unrealized		
2004	Unrealized		
2005	Unrealized		
2006	Unrealized		
2007	Amanda Bynes	Ashley Tisdale; Avril Lavigne; Gwen Stefani	

=== 2010s ===
Year	Winner	Nominees	Ref.
2013	Unrealized		
2014	Selena Gomez	Ariana Grande; Austin Mahone	
2015	Ariana Grande	Taylor Swift; 5 Seconds of Summer	
2016	Taylor Swift	Justin Bieber; One Direction	
