= Radio Disney Music Award for Song of the Year =

Annual US music award

The following is a list of Radio Disney Music Award winners and nominees for Song of the Year (formerly Best Song).

== Winners and nominees ==
=== 2000s ===
Year	Winner	Nominees	Ref.
2001	"I Wanna Be with You" – Mandy Moore	"Aaron's Party (Come Get It)" – Aaron Carter; "Shape of My Heart" – Backstreet Boys	
2002	"Complicated" – Avril Lavigne	"Girlfriend" – 'N Sync; "Not Too Young, Not Too Old" – Aaron Carter	
2003	"So Yesterday" – Hilary Duff	"The Tide Is High (Get the Feeling)" – Atomic Kitten; "Play Like Us" – Lil' Romeo	
2004	"Come Clean" – Hilary Duff	"Don't Tell Me" – Avril Lavigne; "Leave (Get Out)" – JoJo	
2005	"Wake Up" – Hilary Duff	"Rumors" – Lindsay Lohan; "Beautiful Soul" – Jesse McCartney	
2006	"The Best of Both Worlds" – Miley Cyrus	"We're All in This Together" – High School Musical Cast; "Breaking Free" – Vanessa Hudgens and Zac Efron; "SOS" – Rihanna	
2007	"With Love" – Hilary Duff	"Girlfriend" – Avril Lavigne; "See You Again" – Miley Cyrus; "He Said She Said" – Ashley Tisdale	

=== 2010s ===
Year	Winner	Nominees	Ref.
2013	"I Knew You Were Trouble" – Taylor Swift	"Beauty and a Beat" – Justin Bieber featuring Nicki Minaj; "Live While We're Young" – One Direction; "Want U Back" – Cher Lloyd	
2014	"Come & Get It" – Selena Gomez	"Roar" – Katy Perry; "Best Song Ever" – One Direction	
2015	"Problem" – Ariana Grande feat. Iggy Azalea	"All About That Bass" – Meghan Trainor; "Shake It Off" – Taylor Swift	
2016	"Bad Blood" – Taylor Swift	"Cheerleader" – OMI; "Stitches" – Shawn Mendes; "Watch Me (Whip/Nae Nae)" – Silento	
2017	"Treat You Better" – Shawn Mendes	"Cake by the Ocean" – DNCE; "Can't Stop the Feeling!" – Justin Timberlake; "Closer" – The Chainsmokers ft. Halsey; "Sit Still, Look Pretty" – Daya	
2018	"Havana" - Camila Cabello	"Look What You Made Me Do" - Taylor Swift; "The Middle" - Zedd, Maren Morris, and Grey; "There's Nothing Holdin' Me Back" - Shawn Mendes; "Wolves" - Selena Gomez and Marshmello	
