= Radio Disney Music Award for Song to Dance to =

Annual US music award

The following is a list of Radio Disney Music Award winners and nominees for Song to Dance to (formerly Best Song to Dance).

== Winners and nominees ==
=== 2000s ===
Year	Winner	Nominees	Ref.
2001	Unrealized		
2002	Unrealized		
2003	"What I Like About You" – Lillix	"So Yesterday" – Hilary Duff; "Ultimate" – Lindsay Lohan	
2004	"Let's Get It Started" – Black Eyed Peas	"Cinderella" – Cheetah Girls; "Girl Power – Cheetah Girls	
2005	Unrealized		
2006	"Strut" – The Cheetah Girls	"Step Up" – The Cheetah Girls; "We're All in This Together" – High School Musical Cast; "Beat of My Heart" – Hilary Duff	
2007	"Girlfriend" – Avril Lavigne	"He Said She Said" – Ashley Tisdale; "Never Again" – Kelly Clarkson; "With Love" – Hilary Duff	

=== 2010s ===
Year	Winner	Nominees	Ref.
2013	Unrealized		
2014	"Birthday" – Selena Gomez	"Dance with Me Tonight" – Olly Murs; "Wings" – Little Mix	
2015	"Shake It Off" – Taylor Swift	"All About That Bass" – Meghan Trainor; "Too Cool To Dance" – Eden xo	
2016	"Focus" – Ariana Grande	"Break a Sweat" – Becky G; "Uma Thurman" – Fall Out Boy; "Watch Me (Whip/Nae Nae)" – Silento	
2017	"Cold Water" - Major Lazer Feat Justin Bieber & MØ	"Alone" - Marshmello; "Don't Let Me Down" - The Chainsmokers featuring Daya; "Millionaire" - Cash Cash and Digital Farm Animals featuring Nelly; "Never Forget You" - Zara Larsson and MNEK	
