= Radio Disney Music Award for Best New Artist =

Annual US music award

The following is a list of Radio Disney Music Award winners and nominees for Best New Artist.

== Winners and nominees ==
=== 2000s ===
Year	Winner	Nominees	Ref.
2001	Unrealized		
2002	Unrealized		
2003	Unrealized		
2004	Ashlee Simpson	JoJo; Lindsay Lohan	
2005	Unrealized		
2006	Miley Cyrus	Vanessa Hudgens; Zac Efron; Lucas Grabeel	
2007	Ashley Tisdale	Drake Bell; Jonas Brothers; Miranda Cosgrove	

=== 2010s ===
Year	Winner	Nominees	Ref.
2013	Unrealized		
2014	Becky G	Celeste Buckingham; The Vamps	
2015	Charli XCX	Echosmith; Shawn Mendes	
2016	Kelsea Ballerini	DNCE; Daya; Nathan Sykes	
2017	Grace VanderWaal	Julia Michaels; Jon Bellion; Noah Cyrus; Jordan Fisher	
2018	Bebe Rexha	Cheat Codes; Hey Violet; Lauv; Why Don't We	
