= List of awards and nominations received by Hilary Duff =

Hilary Duff awards and nominations
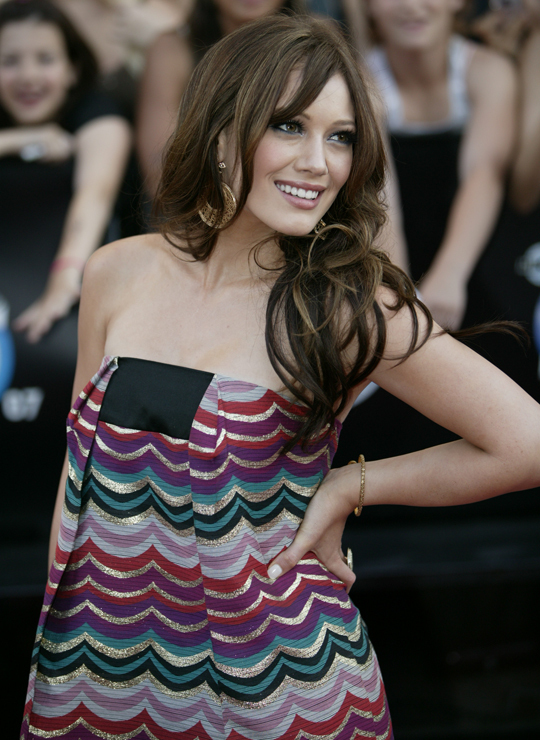
- Duff attending the 2007 MuchMusic Video Awards
Awards and nominations
| Award | Wins | Nominations |
| MTV Video Music Awards | 0 | 1 |
| Nickelodeon Kids' Choice Awards | 2 | 8 |
| People's Choice Awards | 0 | 2 |
| Teen Choice Awards | 4 | 16 |
| World Music Awards | 1 | 1 |
| Young Artist Awards | 2 | 6 |

Totals (Note: Certain award groups do not simply award one winner. They acknowledge several different recipients, have runners-up, and have third place. Since this is a specific recognition and is different from losing an award, runner-up mentions are considered wins in this award tally. For simplification and to avoid errors, each award in this list has been presumed to have had a prior nomination.)
- Wins: 59
- Nominations: 127

The following is a list of awards and nominations received by American actress and singer Hilary Duff. Among her various accolades, she has received seven Nickelodeon Kids' Choice Awards, four Teen Choice Awards, and two Young Artist Awards. Duff has also been nominated for two People's Choice Awards and an MTV Video Music Award.

== Billboard Music Awards ==
| Year | Nominated work | Category | Result | Ref. |
|---|---|---|---|---|
| 2003 | "So Yesterday" | Top Hot 100 Single Sales | Nominated | |
| 2003 | Lizzie McGuire | Top Soundtrack | Nominated | |
| 2003 | The Lizzie McGuire Movie | Top Soundtrack | Nominated | |
| 2004 | Herself | Top Billboard 200 Album Artist - Female | Nominated | |
| 2007 | Herself | Top Hot Dance Club Play Artist | Nominated | |

== Bogart Children's Choice Awards ==
| Year | Nominated work | Category | Result | Ref. |
|---|---|---|---|---|
| 2006 | Hilary Duff | Honor Award | Won | |

== Bravo Otto ==
| Year | Nominated work | Category | Result | Ref. |
|---|---|---|---|---|
| 2004 | Hilary Duff | Best Actress - Silver | Nominated | |

== Channel V Thailand Music Video Awards ==
| Year | Nominated work | Category | Result | Ref. |
|---|---|---|---|---|
| 2003 | Hilary Duff | Most Popular International New Artist | Won | |

== Disney Channel Kids Awards ==
| Year | Nominated work | Category | Result | Ref. |
|---|---|---|---|---|
| 2002 | Hilary Duff | Kids Awards | Won | |

== DVD Exclusive Awards ==
| Year | Nominated work | Category | Result | Ref. |
|---|---|---|---|---|
| 2005 | Hilary Duff | Triple Threat (sales of DVDs in movies, television shows and music) | Won | |
| 2005 | The Girl Can Rock | Best Overall Music Program DVD | Won | |

== Fort Myers Beach Film Festival Award ==
| Year | Nominated work | Category | Result | Ref. |
|---|---|---|---|---|
| 2003 | Hilary Duff | Rising Star of the Year | Won | |

== Golden Raspberry Awards ==
| Year | Nominated work | Category | Result | Ref. |
|---|---|---|---|---|
| 2005 | A Cinderella Story | Worst Actress | Nominated | |
| 2005 | Raise Your Voice | Worst Actress | Nominated | |
| 2006 | Cheaper by the Dozen 2 | Worst Actress | Nominated | |
| 2006 | The Perfect Man | Worst Actress | Nominated | |
| 2007 | Material Girls | Worst Actress | Nominated | |
| 2007 | Material Girls | Worst Screen Couple (with Haylie Duff) | Nominated | |
| 2020 | The Haunting of Sharon Tate | Worst Actress | Won | |

== Juno Awards ==
| Year | Nominated work | Category | Result | Ref. |
|---|---|---|---|---|
| 2004 | Metamorphosis | International Album of the Year | Nominated | |

== People's Choice Awards ==
| Year | Nominated work | Category | Result | Ref. |
|---|---|---|---|---|
| 2016 | Younger | Favorite Cable TV Actress | Nominated | |
| 2017 | Younger | Favorite Cable TV Actress | Nominated | |

== MTV Awards ==
=== MTV Video Music Awards ===
| Year | Nominated work | Category | Result | Ref. |
|---|---|---|---|---|
| 2004 | "Come Clean" | Best Pop Video | Nominated | |

=== Los Premios MTV Latinoamérica ===
| Year | Nominated work | Category | Result | Ref. |
|---|---|---|---|---|
| 2004 | Hilary Duff | Best Pop Artist — International | Nominated | |
| 2005 | Hilary Duff | Best Pop Artist — International | Nominated | |
| 2007 | Hilary Duff | Best Pop Artist — International | Nominated | |
| 2007 | Hilary Duff | Fashionista Award — Female | Nominated | |

=== MTV TRL Awards (USA) ===
| Year | Nominated work | Category | Result | Ref. |
|---|---|---|---|---|
| 2004 | Hilary Duff | Fake ID (Best Artist Under 21) | Won | |
| 2006 | Hilary Duff | Fake ID (Best Artist Under 21) | Nominated | |
| 2006 | Hilary Duff | Quit Your Day Job | Nominated | |

=== MTV Europe Music Awards ===
| Year | Nominated work | Category | Result | Ref. |
|---|---|---|---|---|
| 2005 | Hilary Duff | Best New Act | Nominated | |

=== MTV TRL Awards (Italy) ===
| Year | Nominated work | Category | Result | Ref. |
|---|---|---|---|---|
| 2006 | Hilary Duff | Best New Artist | Won | |
| 2006 | Hilary Duff | First Lady | Nominated | |
| 2007 | Hilary Duff | First Lady | Won | |
| 2007 | Hilary Duff | Best Riempipiazza | Nominated | |
| 2009 | Hilary Duff | First Lady | Won | |
| 2009 | "Reach Out" | Best Number One of the Year | Nominated | |

=== TMF Holand Awards ===
| Year | Nominated work | Category | Result | Ref. |
|---|---|---|---|---|
| 2004 | Hilary Duff | Best Newcomer | Won | |

== Much Love Animal Benefit Awards ==
| Year | Nominated work | Category | Result | Ref. |
|---|---|---|---|---|
| 2006 | Hilary Duff | Won for humanitarian work involving animals. | Won | |

== MuchMusic Video Awards ==
| Year | Nominated work | Category | Result | Ref. |
|---|---|---|---|---|
| 2004 | "Come Clean" | Best International Video - Artist | Nominated | |
| 2004 | "Come Clean" | People's Choice: Favourite International Artist | Nominated | |
| 2007 | "With Love" | Best International Video | Nominated | |
| 2007 | "With Love" | People's Choice Favourite International Artist | Won | |

== Nickelodeon Awards ==
=== Kids' Choice Awards ===
| Year | Nominated work | Category | Result | Ref. |
|---|---|---|---|---|
| 2002 | Lizzie McGuire | Favorite Female TV Star | Nominated | |
| 2003 | Lizzie McGuire | Favorite TV actress | Nominated | |
| 2004 | Lizzie McGuire | Favorite TV actress | Nominated | |
| 2004 | Hilary Duff | Favorite Female Singer | Won | |
| 2005 | Hilary Duff | Favorite Female Singer | Nominated | |
| 2005 | A Cinderella Story | Favorite Movie Actress | Won | |
| 2005 | Lizzie McGuire | Favorite Female TV Star | Nominated | |
| 2006 | Hilary Duff | Favorite Female Singer | Nominated | |
| 2023 | How I Met Your Father | Favorite Female TV Star | Nominated | |

=== Australian Kids' Choice Awards ===
| Year | Nominated work | Category | Result | Ref. |
|---|---|---|---|---|
| 2003 | Hilary Duff | Favorite TV Star | Won | |
| 2004 | Hilary Duff | Favorite TV Star | Won | |
| 2005 | Hilary Duff | Fave Movie Star | Won | |
| 2006 | Hilary Duff | Fave Movie Star Female | Won | |
| 2006 | Hilary Duff | Fave International Artist | Won | |
| 2007 | Hilary Duff | Fave International Singer | Nominated | |

=== Nickelodeon Italy Awards ===
| Year | Nominated work | Category | Result | Ref. |
|---|---|---|---|---|
| 2007 | Hilary Duff | Favorite International Artist | Nominated | |

=== UK's Kids' Choice Awards ===
| Year | Nominated work | Category | Result | Ref. |
|---|---|---|---|---|
| 2007 | Hilary Duff | Best Female Singer | Nominated | |

== Radio Disney Music Awards ==
| Year | Nominated work | Category | Result | Ref. |
|---|---|---|---|---|
| 2001 | "I Can't Wait" | Best Homework Song | Won | |
| 2001 | "I Can't Wait" | Best Soundtrack Song | Won | |
| 2001 | Herself | Most Talked About Artist | Nominated | |
| 2002 | Herself | Best Style | Won | |
| 2003 | Herself | Best Female with Most Style | Won | |
| 2003 | Herself | Best Female Artist | Won | |
| 2003 | "So Yesterday" | Best Song | Won | |
| 2003 | "So Yesterday" | Best Song to Sing Hairbrush Karaoke | Nominated | |
| 2003 | "So Yesterday" | Best Song that Makes You Turn Up the Radio | Nominated | |
| 2003 | "So Yesterday" | Best Song to Dance | Nominated | |
| 2003 | "Girl Can Rock" | Best Song to Air Guitar | Nominated | |
| 2004 | Herself | Best Female Artist | Won | |
| 2004 | Herself | Best Actress Turned Singer | Won | |
| 2004 | Herself | Most Rocking Relative | Won | |
| 2004 | Herself | Most Stylish Singer | Won | |
| 2004 | "The Math" | Best Homework Song | Won | |
| 2004 | "Come Clean" | Best Song | Won | |
| 2004 | "Come Clean" | Best Video that Rocks | Nominated | |
| 2004 | "The Little Voice" | Best Song to Watch Your Dad Sing | Nominated | |
| 2004 | "The Little Voice" | Best Song to Air Guitar | Nominated | |
| 2004 | "What Dreams Are Made For" | Best TV Movie Song | Nominated | |
| 2005 | Herself | Most Stylish Singer | Nominated | |
| 2005 | Herself | Best Female Artist | Won | |
| 2005 | "Wake Up" | Best Song | Won | |
| 2005 | "Wake Up" | Best Song You Can't Believe Your Parents Know The Words To | Nominated | |
| 2005 | "Wake Up" | Best Song to Listen to on the Way to School | Nominated | |
| 2005 | "Fly" | Best Soundtrack Song | Nominated | |
| 2006 | "Beat of My Heart" | Best Song to Dance | Nominated | |
| 2007 | "Stranger" | Best Video That Rocks | Won | |
| 2007 | Herself | Best Female Artist | Won | |
| 2007 | Herself | Best Top 40 Artist | Won | |
| 2007 | "With Love" | Best Song | Won | |
| 2007 | "With Love" | Best Song to Dance | Nominated | |
| 2007 | "With Love" | Best Song to Sing to an Ex | Nominated | |

== Teen Choice Awards ==
| Year | Nominated work | Category | Result | Ref. |
|---|---|---|---|---|
| 2003 | The Lizzie McGuire Movie | Choice Movie Breakout Star - Female | Won | |
| 2003 | The Lizzie McGuire Movie | Choice Movie Actress - Comedy | Nominated | |
| 2003 | Lizzie McGuire | Choice TV Actress - Comedy | Nominated | |
| 2003 | Hilary Duff | Choice TV Hottie | Nominated | |
| 2004 | Cheaper by the Dozen | Choice Movie Blush | Nominated | |
| 2004 | Hilary Duff | Choice Female Artist | Nominated | |
| 2004 | Hilary Duff | Choice Breakout Music Artist | Nominated | |
| 2005 | A Cinderella Story | Choice Movie Blush Scene | Won | |
| 2005 | A Cinderella Story | Choice Movie Actress: Comedy | Nominated | |
| 2005 | A Cinderella Story | Choice Movie Chemistry ^{A} | Nominated | |
| 2005 | A Cinderella Story | Movie Liplock ^{A} | Nominated | |
| 2005 | A Cinderella Story | Choice Movie Love Scene ^{A} | Nominated | |
| 2006 | Cheaper by the Dozen 2 | Movies - Choice Actress: Comedy | Nominated | |
| 2006 | The Perfect Man | Movies - Choice Actress: Comedy | Nominated | |
| 2007 | With Love | Choice Love Song | Won | |
| 2010 | Gossip Girl | Choice TV: Female Scene Stealer | Won | |
| 2017 | Younger | Choice TV Summer Actress | Nominated | |
| 2019 | Younger | Choice Summer TV Actress | Nominated | |

== VH1 Awards ==
| Year | Nominated work | Category | Result | Ref. |
|---|---|---|---|---|
| 2003 | Hilary Duff | Best Breakthrough | Won | |

== Young Artist Awards ==
| Year | Nominated work | Category | Result | Ref. |
|---|---|---|---|---|
| 1999 | Casper Meets Wendy | Best Performance in a TV Movie | Nominated | |
| 2000 | The Soul Collector | Best Supporting Young Actress | Won | |
| 2002 | Lizzie McGuire | Best Performance in a Pilot ^{B} | Nominated | |
| 2002 | Lizzie McGuire | Best Performance in a TV Comedy Series | Nominated | |
| 2003 | Lizzie McGuire | Best Performance in a Pilot ^{C} | Nominated | |
| 2004 | Cheaper by the Dozen | Best Young Ensemble in a Feature Film ^{D} | Won | |

== World Music Awards ==
| Year | Nominated work | Category | Result | Ref. |
|---|---|---|---|---|
| 2004 | Hilary Duff | Best Selling New Female Artist | Won | |

== Other Awards/Nominations ==
=== AOL Awards ===
| Year | Nominated work | Category | Result | Ref. |
|---|---|---|---|---|
| 2004 | Hilary Duff | Most Searched For Person Of The Year Teen Category | Won | |

=== Basenotes Awards ===
| Year | Nominated work | Category | Result | Ref. |
|---|---|---|---|---|
| 2008 | With Love... Hilary Duff | Best Celebrity Women's Fragrance | Nominated | |

=== Blender Magazine Awards ===
| Year | Nominated work | Category | Result | Ref. |
|---|---|---|---|---|
| 2007 | "Stranger" | Dangerously In Love Song Of The Year | Won | |

=== Cosmopolitan Magazine Awards ===
| Year | Nominated work | Category | Result | Ref. |
|---|---|---|---|---|
| 2005 | Hilary Duff | Born To Lead | Won | |

=== Seventeen Magazine Awards ===
| Year | Nominated work | Category | Result | Ref. |
|---|---|---|---|---|
| 2009 | Hilary Duff | Style Star of the Year | Won | |

=== Sugar Magazine Awards ===
| Year | Nominated work | Category | Result | Ref. |
|---|---|---|---|---|
| 2005 | Hilary Duff | Woman Of The Year | Won | |

=== Portrait Magazine Awards ===
| Year | Nominated work | Category | Result | Ref. |
|---|---|---|---|---|
| 2009 | Hilary Duff | Best Dressed Female Celebrity | Won | |
| 2009 | Hilary Duff | Top Celebrity Under 30 | Won | |

=== MuchMusic Viewer's Poll ===
| Year | Nominated work | Category | Result | Ref. |
|---|---|---|---|---|
| 2007 | Hilary Duff | Best Performance 2007 MuchMusic Video Awards | Won | |
| 2007 | Hilary Duff | Most Coveted Closet (Best Overall Female Style) | Won | |

=== Rolling Stone Music Award ===
| Year | Nominated work | Category | Result | Ref. |
|---|---|---|---|---|
| 2003 | Hilary Duff | Teenage Artist Of The Year | Won | |

=== StyleBistro Awards ===
| Year | Nominated work | Category | Result | Ref. |
|---|---|---|---|---|
| 2012 | Hilary Duff | Best Maternity Style Reader's Choice Winner | Won | |

== Shortlists ==
=== Askmen Top 99 Women ===
| Year | Countdown Name | Rank |
|---|---|---|
| 2006 | Top 99 Women | #86 |
| 2007 | Top 99 Women | #84 |
| 2008 | Top 99 Women | #81 |
| 2010 | Top 99 Women | #81 |

=== Billboard Magazine ===
| Year | Countdown Name | Rank |
|---|---|---|
| 2003 | Year End 200 Albums | #51 Metamorphosis |
| 2003 | Year End 25 Soundtracks | #5 The Lizzie McGuire Movie (soundtrack) |
| 2003 | Year End 200 Artists | #43 |
| 2004 | Year End 200 Albums | #17 Metamorphosis |
| 2004 | Year End 200 Albums | #112 Hilary Duff |
| 2004 | Year End 25 Soundtracks | #7 The Lizzie McGuire Movie (soundtrack) |
| 2004 | Year End 25 Soundtracks | #10 A Cinderella Story (soundtrack) |
| 2004 | Year End 200 Artists | #11 |
| 2004 | Year End Top Pop Artist | #40 |
| 2005 | Year End 200 Albums | #65 Hilary Duff |
| 2005 | Year End 200 Albums | #86 Most Wanted |
| 2005 | Year End 200 Artists | #26 |
| 2006 | Year End 200 Albums | #104 Most Wanted |
| 2007 | Year End 200 Albums | #151 Dignity |
| 2010 | 100 Most Exotic Voices | #10 |
| 2000s | Decade End 200 Artists | #69 |
| 2000s | Decade End Soundtracks | #11 The Lizzie McGuire Movie (soundtrack) |
| 2000s | Decade End 200 Albums | #80 Metamorphosis |

=== MuchMusic ===
| Year | Countdown Name | Rank |
|---|---|---|
| 2004 | Much Music Most Wanted 20 Hottest Girls of 2004 | #8 |
| 2005 | Much Music Most Wanted 20 Hottest Girls of 2005 | #3 |
| 2008 | Much Music Most Wanted 20 Hottest Girls of 2008 | #7 |
| 2008 | Much Music Top 12 Most Powerful Musicians of Today | #5 |

=== People Magazine ===
| Year | Countdown Name | Rank |
|---|---|---|
| 2005 | People Magazine's 10 Most Stylish Stars | #3 |
| 2005 | People Magazine's 50 Most Beautiful People | #13 |
| 2007 | People Magazine's 100 Most Beautiful People | #16 |

=== Portrait Magazine Top Celebs Under 30 ===
| Year | Countdown Name | Rank |
|---|---|---|
| 2006 | Top Celebs Under 30 | #24 |
| 2007 | Top Celebs Under 30 | #12 |
| 2008 | Top Celebs Under 30 | #24 |
| 2009 | Top Celebs Under 30 | #1 |
| 2010 | Top Celebs Under 30 | #14 |
| 2011 | Top Celebs Under 30 | #10 |

=== Rolling Stone ===
| Year | Countdown Name | Rank |
|---|---|---|
| 2004 | 50 Richest Rockers | #46 |
| 2006 | 30 Richest Rockers | #24 |

=== Teen People 25 Hottest Stars Under 25 ===
| Year | Countdown Name | Rank |
|---|---|---|
| 2004 | 25 Hottest Stars Under 25 | #7 |
| 2005 | 25 Hottest Stars Under 25 | #10 |
| 2006 | 25 Hottest Stars Under 25 | #10 |

=== Zimbio ===
| Year | Countdown Name | Rank |
|---|---|---|
| 2010 | 100 Hottest Celebrity Couples | #78 |
| 2011 | 100 Hottest Celebrity Couples | #67 |

=== FHM & Maxim's Magazine Rankings ===
| Year | Countdown Name | Rank |
|---|---|---|
| 2004 | France's 100 Sexiest Women of 2004 | #64 |
| 2004 | South Africa's 100 Sexiest Women of 2004 | #75 |
| 2005 | 100 Sexiest Women of 2005 | #95 |
| 2005 | FHM Australia's 100 Sexiest Women of 2005 | #6 |
| 2005 | South Africa's 100 Sexiest Women of 2005 | #56 |
| 2005 | France's 100 Sexiest Women of 2005 | #62 |
| 2005 | Philippines's 100 Sexiest Women of 2005 | #43 |
| 2006 | 100 Sexiest Women of 2006 | #33 |
| 2006 | USA's 100 Sexiest Women of 2006 | #58 |
| 2006 | Australia's 100 Sexiest Women of 2006 | #46 |
| 2007 | Maxim's Hot 100 Women 2007 | #23 |
| 2007 | 100 Sexiest Women of 2007 | #39 |
| 2007 | USA's 100 Sexiest Women of 2007 | #39 |
| 2008 | Maxim's Hot 100 Women 2008 | #25 |
| 2008 | 100 Sexiest Women of 2008 | #8 |
| 2008 | USA's 100 Sexiest Women of 2008 | #7 |
| 2008 | Spain's 100 Sexiest Women of 2008 | #19 |
| 2008 | Australia's 100 Sexiest Women of 2008 | #88 |
| 2009 | Maxim's Hot 100 Women 2009 | #31 |
| 2009 | 100 Sexiest Women of 2009 | #71 |
| 2009 | USA's 100 Sexiest Women of 2009 | #40 |
| 2009 | India's 100 Sexiest Women of 2009 | #30 |
| 2010 | Maxim's Hot 100 Women 2010 | #27 |
| 2010 | 100 Sexiest Women of 2010 | #28 |
| 2011 | Maxim's Hot 100 Women 2011 | #40 |

== Notes ==
- ^A Shared with Chad Michael Murray.
- ^B Shared with Lalaine, Jake Thomas, Adam Lamberg and Ashlie Brillault
- ^C Shared with Lalaine, Jake Thomas and Adam Lamberg.
- ^D Shared with Brent Kinsman, Shane Kinsman, Forrest Landis, Steven Anthony Lawrence, Liliana Mumy, Kevin Schmidt, Jacob Smith, Alyson Stoner, Blake Woodruff and Morgan York.
