= Radio Disney Music Award for Best Artist Turned Singer =

Annual US music award

The following is a list of Radio Disney Music Award winners and nominees for Best Artist Turned Singer (also known as Best Actress Turned Singer).

== Winners and nominees ==
=== 2000s ===
Year	Winner	Nominees	Ref.
2001	Unrealized		
2002	Unrealized		
2003	Unrealized		
2004	Hilary Duff	Lindsay Lohan; Mandy Moore	
2005	Raven-Symoné	Emma Roberts; Hayden Panettiere	
2006	Miley Cyrus	Vanessa Hudgens; Alyson Michalka; Raven-Symoné	
2007	Amanda Bynes	Ashley Tisdale; Drake Bell; Miranda Cosgrove	
