= Girlfriend (Avril Lavigne song) =

2007 single by Avril Lavigne

Single by Avril Lavigne

from the album The Best Damn Thing
- B-side: "Alone"
- Released: February 27, 2007
- Recorded: 2006
- Studio: Conway, Henson, Ocean Way (Los Angeles); Monster Sound (New York City)
- Genre: Pop-punk; power pop; bubblegum pop; pop rock
- Length: 3:37
- Label: RCA
- Songwriters: Avril Lavigne; Lukasz Gottwald
- Producer: Dr. Luke

Avril Lavigne singles chronology
"Keep Holding On" (2006)	"Girlfriend" (2007)	"When You're Gone" (2007)

Music video
- "Girlfriend" on YouTube

"Girlfriend" is a song by the Canadian singer-songwriter Avril Lavigne from her third studio album, The Best Damn Thing (2007). It was released as the lead single on February 27, 2007, through RCA Records. The song was written alongside producer Dr. Luke; the latter is also the producer. Lyrically, the song revolves around its protagonist having a crush on someone who is in a relationship, proclaiming she should be his girlfriend.

"Girlfriend" received mixed reviews from music critics, who complimented its catchiness but criticized the song's departure from Lavigne's pop-punk rock roots. The song was a worldwide success, peaking at the top spot of the charts in eight countries, including Australia, New Zealand, Canada and was Lavigne's first number-one song in the United States, reaching the top of the Billboard Hot 100 and Mainstream Top 40. It additionally charted in the top ten of most other countries. The song's accompanying music video, directed by The Malloys, sees Lavigne portraying three alter-egos, with all of them fighting over the same guy. In June 2007, the song's official remix, featuring American rapper Lil Mama, was released. Lavigne performed the song a number of times, including at the 2007 MuchMusic Video Awards, the 2007 Teen Choice Awards, and the 2008 Juno Awards.

The song's success made it a mainstay of pop music in the late 2000s. "Girlfriend" was certified multi-platinum in Australia and the United States. It was among the top-selling songs of 2007-2008, with over 7.3 million worldwide sales. In 2008, the song became the most viewed video on YouTube, and was the first video on the site to reach 100 million views. Rolling Stone ranked the song number thirty-five on their "Top 100 Songs of 2007" list. Several versions of the song were released with the chorus sung in multiple languages. In 2010, the song was named the ninety-fourth most successful song on the Hot 100 in the 2000s decade. AllMusic highlighted the song as one of the most significant pop punk songs of all time. The song also received several awards, including Most Addictive Track at the MTV Europe Music Awards, Song of the Year at Los Premios MTV Latinoamérica, Choice Music: Single at Teen Choice Awards, the Nickelodeon Kids' Choice Award for Favorite Song and was nominated for Single of the Year at the Juno Awards.

== Background ==
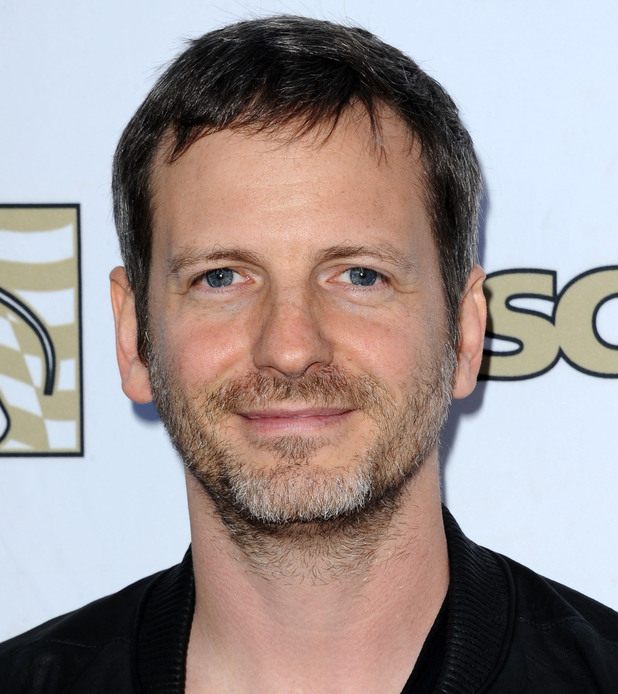
Dr. Luke produced the song.

Following the release of her second studio album, Under My Skin (2004), Lavigne wanted to record more "fun and upbeat" music. "Girlfriend" was written by Lavigne and Lukasz "Dr. Luke" Gottwald, with Dr. Luke also producing the track. The song was written while Lavigne was intoxicated, with Lavigne commenting that the chorus only took two minutes to write. Lavigne was initially hesitant to release "Girlfriend" as the lead single from The Best Damn Thing, referring to the song's conception as "just a joke." The song was not based on a personal experience, with Lavigne opting to write about general topics to appeal to a wider audience. In December 2006, Lavigne announced the song as the lead single from her then-upcoming album:

Hey guys! I keep getting asked about my record and what it is called [...] so I wanted to give u guys all the info directly [...] I'm calling the record The Best Dam Thing, and the first single is called "Girlfriend", the single comes out February and the record in April. I promise you guys will love this record, it is my favorite one!!! And I can't wait! It is really fast, fun, young, bratty, aggressive, confident, cocky in a playful way [...] all the good stuff.

In an effort to appeal to non-English markets, Lavigne recorded the song's chorus in seven different languages, including Spanish, French, Italian, Portuguese, German, Japanese, and Mandarin. Lavigne spent hours studying these different languages in order to ensure a correct pronunciation with her various deliveries. A Hindi version of the song was recorded twice, although it was scrapped due to issues with the diction and meter when converting the song's chorus from its Western rhythms to Hindi.

== Content ==
Avril Lavigne – "Girlfriend"
A 21-second sample of the song.

"Girlfriend" is a moderately fast pop-punk, power pop and bubblegum pop song. According to the sheet music published at Musicnotes.com by Alfred Publishing, the song is written in the key of D major and is set in time signature of common time with a tempo of 164 beats per minute. Lavigne's vocal range spans two octaves, from A_{3} to D_{5}. Lyrically, the song is about wanting to steal someone's boyfriend. PopMatters compared the song with "Mickey" by Tony Basil.

=== Songwriting claim ===
On July 2, 2007, the Rubinoos frontman Tommy Dunbar and songwriter James Gangwer filed a lawsuit for infringement of copyright against Lavigne, Dr. Luke, RCA Records, and Apple. Dunbar and Gangwer alleged that "Girlfriend" plagiarized the Rubinoos' 1979 single "I Wanna Be Your Boyfriend". Lavigne denied these accusations and noted the common usage of the lyrics employed in both songs; she cited the Rolling Stones' "Get Off of My Cloud" and the Ramones' "I Wanna Be Your Boyfriend" as songs with similar lyrics. Dr. Luke claimed that neither he nor Lavigne had heard of the Rubinoos prior to the lawsuit and that he would be willing to take a polygraph if doing so would help to disprove Dunbar's claims. Lavigne's manager, Terry McBride, similarly refuted the allegations, referring to Dunbar and Gangwer's claims as baseless.

Both Dunbar and McBride consulted musicologists to prepare reports on the similarities and dissimilarities between the songs. Dunbar's musicologist reported that there was an "unusually high degree of similarity" between the songs while McBride's musicologist reported that they do not share any significant lyrical or melodic content. While McBride contended that the songs were dissimilar, he acknowledged that Lavigne would be willing to settle the case to avoid expensive legal proceedings. In January 2008, Dunbar and Gangwer's attorney, Nicholas Carlin, confirmed that a confidential settlement had been reached between the two parties, but refused to comment further. However, Dunbar and Gangwer later released a joint statement on January 15, 2008, in which they claimed to "completely exonerate" Lavigne and Dr. Luke from any wrongdoing. Following the settlement, Lavigne commented: "Well, [Dunbar and Gangwer] didn't win. But that happens all the time in the music business. I am not the first artist nor will I be the last to go through this."

== Critical reception ==
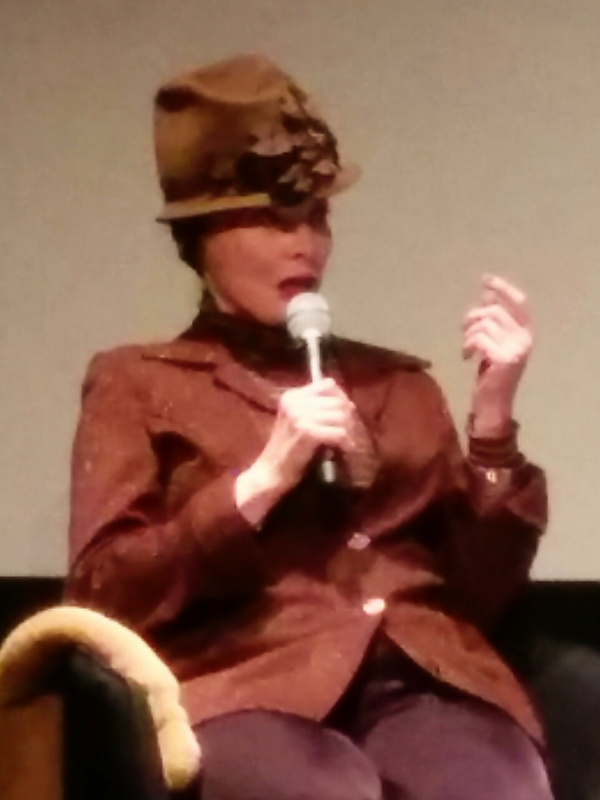
"Girlfriend" was compared to "Mickey" by American singer Toni Basil.

Christian Hoard of Rolling Stone called it a "hypercatchy, giant-sounding 'Hey Mickey' tribute", and commented that the song is one of the album's "monster pleasures". Chris Willman of Entertainment Weekly noted the popularity of the song, referring to Lavigne as an "alpha female out to steal a stud from a meek rival who’s 'like, so whatever'". Stephen Thomas Erlewine of AllMusic highlighted the song as a 'track pick' in a review of the album, The Best Damn Thing. He praised the album for opening with "Girlfriend", describing the song as a "bright bubblegum blast". Jon Pareles of The New York Times also highlighted "Girlfriend" as the best song off of The Best Damn Thing, commenting that it used "cleverly manipulated echoes and attacks to sound as if Ms. Lavigne were charging in from all directions". Jody Rosen of Slate referred to "Girlfriend" as "brash and catchy", praising the song's "shout-along vocals, power chords, [and] hand claps amplified to sound like an army on the march".

According to Sal Cinquemani of Slant Magazine, the song employs "a catchy, cheerleader stomp a la Tony Basil's 'Mickey'", although Lavigne's "attempts at sounding irreverent ... just wind up sounding juvenile". Laura Snapes of The Guardian also compared "Girlfriend" to "Mickey", referring to the song as a "deadpan cheerleader banger". Also from The Guardian, Alex Macpherson labeled the song as "brilliantly addictive". Tim O'Neil of PopMatters felt that the chorus of the song "blatantly rips the hook from Toni Basil's 'Mickey'", although he also stated that the song has a "torturous propensity to get stuck in your head". Joan Anderman of The Boston Globe praised the catchy hook of "Girlfriend", commenting that "It sounds great—fizzy and snotty and unbelievable catchy". MuchMusic attributed the success of the song to the mix of various genres, stating: "[Lavigne] can succeed in punk, rock and pop with her bubblegum anthem 'Girlfriend'". At the Juno Awards of 2008, "Girlfriend" garnered Lavigne a nomination in the Single of the Year category. The song also garnered Lavigne two wins at the 2008 Japan Gold Disc Awards in the Mastertone of the Year and Single Track of the Year (Mobile) categories. The song was ranked at number 35 on Rolling Stone's list of the 100 Best Songs of 2007. MTV Asia ranked the song as the 77th top song of 2007, while MTV Latin America listed "Girlfriend" as the number one song of 2007. Billboard ranked the song as the twelfth best song of 2007.

== Chart performance ==
Because of digital download sales in excess of 122,000, the song debuted at number five on the US Billboard Hot 100 chart, becoming her fifth and last top ten hit. Afterwards it became Lavigne's first song to reach number one on the Hot 100, in the issue dated May 5, 2007; her previous highest peak on the chart was with 2002's "Complicated", which reached number two. It remained in the top ten for 18 weeks, which was two more than the year-end number-one single of 2007, Irreplaceable. It became the last number one hit on that chart by a Canadian female artist until 2012's "Call Me Maybe" by Carly Rae Jepsen. In Canada, the song debuted at number 1. As of September 2015, "Girlfriend" has sold 3.8 million copies in the United States.

In Japan, the song has been certified Million for more than 1,000,000 sales through ringtones and 3× Platinum for 750,000 sales. Thus, the song has sold more than 3,000,000 copies there making it the best-selling single by a western female artist of all time on Japan. "Girlfriend" debuted on the Australian ARIA Singles Chart at number three. The following week it reached number-one, and it remained at the top for six non-consecutive weeks, equalling Lavigne's previous number-one single on the ARIA Charts, "Complicated". After three weeks on the charts, it was certified gold by ARIA, then platinum after seven weeks for sales in excess of 70,000 copies. It was then certified double platinum, with sales in excess of 140,000. In 2008, it was certified quadruple platinum for sales of 280,000. On the UK Singles Chart, "Girlfriend" peaked at number two, surpassing "Complicated" as Lavigne's highest-peaking single on the chart. The song ended 2007 as the years 20th biggest-selling single in the UK and spent 28 weeks inside the chart and is Lavigne's biggest hit in the UK to date. It became the best selling song of 2007 worldwide with around five million copies outside the US. To date, "Girlfriend" has sold over 10 million copies worldwide.

== Music video ==
=== Development and concept ===
Lavigne as her regular self (first image) with two of her alter-egos in the video for "Girlfriend".

The music video was directed by The Malloys and filmed at Golf N' Stuff mini-golf course in Norwalk, California. They praised the video for "sounding different than most female artists at the time and for its very punk rock-pop feel, something she does better than anybody."

The music video features two women both played by Lavigne: one with glasses and red hair, and one with a rebellious persona and black hair. The video portrays both of them fighting over the redheaded woman's boyfriend (played by American model Bryan McMullin). The video's storyline is interwoven with shots of Lavigne with pink-streaked blonde hair performing with her band. The video also featured this Lavigne and her friends dancing in a restroom. Eventually the man develops feelings for the black-haired woman and they enter a relationship. The redhead attempts to break them up but is thwarted and falls into a portable toilet. The blonde-haired Lavigne seen throughout the video then takes the man into a bathroom stall, pumping her arm in victory.

Lavigne's boyfriend in the video dresses similarly to the "rocker" Lavigne in the video. The video features Lavigne's previous guitarist Evan Taubenfeld, and Lavigne's brother Matt on bass.

Lil Mama and Lavigne shot a video for the remix of "Girlfriend", which was directed by R. Malcolm Jones.

=== Reception ===
On July 18, 2008, "Girlfriend" became the most viewed video at that time on YouTube and in August of that year, surpassed 100 million views, becoming the first YouTube video to reach that milestone. CSS's "Music Is My Hot Hot Sex" had allegedly reached that milestone a couple months before, but was removed due to accusations that the views had been fraudulent. In July, Lavigne's manager Terry McBride claimed that the singer was owed $2 million in revenue from YouTube.

The fansite AvrilBandaids allegedly artificially inflated views on the YouTube video. It circulated a weblink that, when opened, was supposed to automatically reload the YouTube video of "Girlfriend" every fifteen seconds. Fans were encouraged to leave the link open on their computer, and even open up multiple instances to inflate viewcounts. In November 2009, RCA Records removed the video of the song from YouTube, by which time it had received around 130 million views. A new upload of the music video uploaded on October 3, 2009, is now officially hosted on Lavigne's official channel on YouTube, with over 695 million views and nearly 4.2 million likes as of October 2025.

The song is featured on the soundtrack to the video game Burnout Dominator in four different languages which includes Japanese, Spanish, Mandarin and English. The song is also featured in Burnout Paradise which only includes the English Version.

The BBC Chart Show published two reviews, one negative and one positive, to represent polarized attitudes towards the video.

== Accolades ==
Awards for "Girlfriend"
Year	Organization	Award	Result	Ref.
2007	Los Premios MTV Latinoamérica	Song of the Year	Won	
2007	MTV Europe Music Awards	Most Addictive Track	Won	
2007	MTV Video Music Awards	Monster Single of the Year	Nominated	
2007	MuchMusic Video Awards	Best International Video By A Canadian	Won	
2007	MuchMusic Video Awards	People's Choice Favourite Canadian Artist	Won	
2007	Nickelodeon Australian Kids' Choice Awards	Fave Song	Nominated	
2007	Nickelodeon UK Kids' Choice Awards	MTV Hits Best Music Video	Won	
2007	Planeta Awards	Pop/Hip Hop Song of the Year	Nominated	
2007	Premios Oye!	Main English Song of the Year	Nominated	
2007	Radio Disney Music Awards	Best Song	Nominated	
2007	Radio Disney Music Awards	Best Song to Dance	Won	
2007	Radio Disney Music Awards	Best Song to Sing to an Ex	Nominated	
2007	Radio Disney Music Awards	Best Video That Rocks	Nominated	
2007	Teen Choice Awards	Choice Music: Single	Won	
2007	Virgin Media Music Awards	Best Track	Nominated	
2008	ASCAP Pop Music Awards	Most Performed Song	Won	
2008	Capricho Awards	Best Video at YouTube	Nominated	
2008	Japan Gold Disc Awards	Mastertone of the Year	Won	
2008	Japan Gold Disc Awards	Single Track of the Year (Mobile)	Won	
2008	Juno Awards	Single of the Year	Nominated	
2008	MTV Asia Awards	Best Hook-up	Nominated	
2008	MTV Italian Music Awards	Best Number One of the Year	Nominated	
2008	MTV Video Music Awards Japan	Best Pop Video	Won	
2008	MTV Video Music Awards Japan	Best Karaokee! Song	Nominated	
2008	MuchMusic Video Awards	MuchMusic.com Most Watched Video	Nominated	
2008	Myx Music Awards	Favorite International Video	Nominated	
2008	Nickelodeon Kids' Choice Awards	Favorite Song	Won	
2008	RTHK International Pop Poll Award	Top Ten International Gold Songs	Won	
2008	SOCAN Awards	SOCAN Salutes †	Won	
2008	SOCAN Awards	Pop/Rock Music Award	Won	
2013	AllMusic	Most Significant Punk-Pop Songs of All Time †	Longlisted	

== Live performances ==
=== Late-night television ===
Lavigne performed the song on Saturday Night Live on April 14, 2007. She also performed on The Tonight Show with Jay Leno on June 15, 2007.

=== Special events ===
Lavigne performed the song for the MuchMusic Video Awards on June 17, 2007 and also performed it for the Teen Choice Awards on August 26, 2007. For the charity fundraiser event Fashion Rocks, she performed the song again on September 6, 2007. She also performed the song for the Premios MTV Latinoamérica on October 18, 2007.

=== Touring ===
"Girlfriend" was on the setlist for all of Lavigne's tours since its release, including The Best Damn Tour (2008), the Black Star Tour (2011-2012), the Avril Lavigne Tour (2013-2014), the Head Above Water Tour (2019), the Love Sux Tour (2022-2023), and the Greatest Hits Tour (2024-2025), which is set to conclude on June 29, 2025.

=== Other ===
Lavigne performed "Girlfriend" at the Orange Lounge in Toronto on August 23, 2007, for the AOL Sessions on May 24, 2011, and more recently with Travis Barker for SiriusXM + Pandora's Small Stage Series concert in February 2022.

== Track listings and formats ==
- Digital download
1. "Girlfriend" – 3:39
- Digital download (Remix)
1. "Girlfriend" (Dr. Luke Remix feat. Lil Mama) – 3:25
- Digital download (Remixes)
1. "Girlfriend" (Junkie XL Mix) – 3:40
2. "Girlfriend" (Junkie XL Extended Mix) – 5:44
- EU / AUS / TWN CD Single'
1. "Girlfriend" – 3:38
2. "Alone" – 3:13
- JP CD Single
1. "Girlfriend" (Radio Edit) – 3:38
2. "Girlfriend" (Instrumental) – 3:37
- US Remixes CD
1. "Girlfriend" (Dr. Luke Remix feat. Lil Mama) – 3:24
2. "Girlfriend" (Japanese Version) – 3:37
3. "Keep Holding On" – 4:00
4. Ringtone^{1}
- Digital download (EP)
1. "Girlfriend" (Radio Edit) – 3:37
2. "Girlfriend" – 3:37
3. "Girlfriend" (The Submarines' Time Warp '66 Mix - English) – 3:11
4. "Girlfriend" (Junkie XL Mix) – 3:41
5. "Girlfriend" (French Version - Clean) – 3:38
6. "Girlfriend" (French Version - Explicit) – 3:38
7. "Girlfriend" (The Submarines' Time Warp '66 Mix - French) – 3:13
8. "Girlfriend" (Spanish Version - Clean) – 3:36
9. "Girlfriend" (Spanish Version - Explicit) – 3:38
10. "Girlfriend" (The Submarines' Time Warp '66 Mix - Spanish) – 3:13
11. "Girlfriend" (German Version - Clean) – 3:38
12. "Girlfriend" (German Version - Explicit) – 3:38
13. "Girlfriend" (The Submarines' Time Warp '66 Mix - German) – 3:12
14. "Girlfriend" (Italian Version - Clean) – 3:38
15. "Girlfriend" (Italian Version - Explicit) – 3:38
16. "Girlfriend" (The Submarines' Time Warp '66 Mix - Italian) – 3:12
17. "Girlfriend" (Portuguese Version - Clean) – 3:37
18. "Girlfriend" (Portuguese Version - Explicit) – 3:38
19. "Girlfriend" (The Submarines' Time Warp '66 Mix - Portuguese) – 3:10
20. "Girlfriend" (Japanese Version - Clean) – 3:38
21. "Girlfriend" (Japanese Version - Explicit) – 3:38
22. "Girlfriend" (The Submarines' Time Warp '66 Mix - Japanese) – 3:12
23. "Girlfriend" (Mandarin Version - Clean) – 3:28
24. "Girlfriend" (Mandarin Version - Explicit) – 3:28
25. "Girlfriend" (The Submarines' Time Warp '66 Mix - Mandarin) – 3:13

^{1} A code was included on the CD to download the ringtone online.

== Credits and personnel ==
Credits and personnel are adapted from The Best Damn Thing album liner notes.

- Avril Lavigne – lead vocals, songwriting
- Dr. Luke – songwriting, production, drums, guitars, bass, programming
- Serban Ghenea – mixing
- John Hanes – vocal editing
- Tim Roberts – assistant engineer
- Matt Beckley – additional production
- Steven Wolf – additional production, live drums, additional drums

== Charts ==
=== Weekly charts ===
Chart (2007)	Peak position
Australia (ARIA)	1
Austria (Ö3 Austria Top 40)	1
Belgium (Ultratop 50 Flanders)	8
Belgium (Ultratop 50 Wallonia)	7
Canada Hot 100 (Billboard)	1
Canada CHR/Top 40 (Billboard)	3
Canada Hot AC (Billboard)	1
CIS Airplay (TopHit)	36
Croatia (HRT)	3
Czech Republic Airplay (ČNS IFPI)	4
Denmark (Tracklisten)	8
Europe (Eurochart Hot 100)	1
Finland Download (Latauslista)	4
France (SNEP)	2
Germany (GfK)	3
Hungary (Rádiós Top 40)	1
Hungary (Dance Top 40)	1
Ireland (IRMA)	1
Italy (FIMI)	1
Japan (Oricon)	27
Netherlands (Dutch Top 40 Tipparade)	1
Netherlands (Single Top 100)	34
New Zealand (Recorded Music NZ)	1
Romania (Romanian Top 100)	46
Russia Airplay (TopHit)	33
Scottish Singles Sales (Official Charts)	1
Slovakia Airplay (ČNS IFPI)	4
Sweden (Sverigetopplistan)	1
Switzerland (Schweizer Hitparade)	3
UK Singles (Official Charts)	2
US Billboard Hot 100	1
US Adult Pop Airplay (Billboard)	13
US Pop Airplay (Billboard)	1
US Rhythmic Airplay (Billboard); Avril featuring Lil Mama	36
Venezuela Pop Rock (Record Report)	1

=== Year-end charts ===
Chart (2007)	Rank
Australia (ARIA)	2
Austria (Ö3 Austria Top 40)	11
Belgium (Ultratop 50 Flanders)	36
Belgium (Ultratop 50 Wallonia)	26
Brazil (Crowley)	22
CIS (Tophit)	144
Europe (Eurochart Hot 100)	10
France (SNEP)	34
Germany (Media Control GfK)	25
Global Digital Sales (IFPI)	1
Hungary (Dance Top 40)	99
Ireland (IRMA)	8
Italy (FIMI)	10
Lebanon (The Official Lebanese Top 20)	54
New Zealand (RIANZ)	14
Sweden (Sverigetopplistan)	33
Switzerland (Schweizer Hitparade)	29
UK Singles (OCC)	20
US Billboard Hot 100	12

=== Decade-end charts ===
Chart (2000–2009)	Rank
Australia (ARIA)	66
US Billboard Hot 100	94

== Certifications and sales ==
Region	Certification	Certified units/sales
Australia (ARIA)	4× Platinum	280,000^{^}
Austria (IFPI Austria)	Gold	15,000^{*}
Belgium (BRMA)	Gold	25,000^{*}
Brazil (Pro-Música Brasil)	Platinum	60,000^{*}
Canada (Music Canada)	4× Platinum	320,000^{‡}
Canada (Music Canada) Ringtone	2× Platinum	80,000^{*}
Denmark (IFPI Danmark)	Gold	45,000^{‡}
Germany (BVMI)	Gold	150,000^{‡}
Italy	—	25,000
Japan (RIAJ)	3× Platinum	750,000^{^}
Japan (RIAJ) Ringtone	Million	1,000,000^{*}
Japan (RIAJ) Download	2× Platinum	500,000^{*}
Japan (RIAJ) PC download	Gold	100,000^{*}
New Zealand (RMNZ)	2× Platinum	60,000^{‡}
United Kingdom (BPI)	2× Platinum	1,200,000^{‡}
United States (RIAA)	7× Platinum	7,000,000^{‡}
United States (RIAA) Mastertone	Platinum	1,000,000^{*}
Summaries
Worldwide	—	7,300,000
^{*} Sales figures based on certification alone.^{^} Shipments figures based on certification alone.^{‡} Sales+streaming figures based on certification alone.

== Release history ==
Region	Date	Format	Label	Ref.
United States	March 20, 2007	Contemporary hit radio	RCA	
Japan	March 21, 2007	CD single	BMG	
Germany	March 30, 2007	CD single	Sony BMG	
United Kingdom	April 2, 2007	CD single	Sony BMG	

== See also ==
- List of best-selling singles
- List of number-one singles in Australia of 2007
- List of number-one hits of 2007 (Austria)
- List of European number-one hits of 2007
- List of number-one singles of 2007 (Ireland)
- List of number-one hits of 2007 (Italy)
- List of Swedish number-one hits
- List of number-one singles from the 2000s (New Zealand)
- List of Hot 100 number-one singles of 2007 (U.S.)
- List of number-one music downloads (UK)
- List of most-viewed YouTube videos
