= 2018 Radio Disney Music Awards =

Annual US music awards ceremony

- Date: June 22, 2018 (ceremony); June 23, 2018 (air)
- Location: Dolby Theatre, Los Angeles, California

Highlights
- Most awards: BTS (4)
- Most nominations: Selena Gomez, Marshmello, Maren Morris and BTS (4 each)
- Website: http://radio.disney.com/radio-disney-music-awards

Television/radio coverage
- Network: Radio Disney; Disney Channel; Disney International HD
- Runtime: 99 Minutes
- Viewership: 1.28 million

The 2018 Radio Disney Music Awards were held on June 22, 2018, at the Dolby Theatre in Los Angeles, California. The ceremony was shown on Radio Disney and Disney Channel the following night on June 23, 2018, from 8:30 p.m. to 01:30 a.m. (EDT) and on Disney International HD and VTV3 on July 29, 2018 from 8 p.m. to 9 p.m. (IST). It was cancelled on Disney Channel in Southeast Asia and VTV6 in Vietnam for unknown reasons.

== Performances ==
Performer(s)	Song
Meghan Trainor	"Let You Be Right" "No Excuses"
Echosmith	"Over My Head" "Cool Kids"
Kelly Clarkson	"Miss Independent" "Since U Been Gone" "My Life Would Suck Without You" "Catch My Breath" "Stronger" "Heat"
Marshmello	"Alone" "Friends" "Silence"
Maddie Poppe	"Going, Going, Gone"
Charlie Puth	"The Way I Am"
Carrie Underwood; Ludacris	"The Champion"

== Winners and nominees ==
Nominees were announced via a nomination live stream on April 27, 2018. Voting also began on the same day.

Best Artist	Breakout Artist of the Year
Shawn Mendes; Selena Gomez; Bruno Mars; Ed Sheeran; Taylor Swift; Meghan Trainor	Camila Cabello; Halsey; Dua Lipa; Marshmello; Julia Michaels; Charlie Puth
Best Group	Song of the Year
BTS; Clean Bandit; Echosmith; Imagine Dragons; Maroon 5	"Havana" - Camila Cabello; "Look What You Made Me Do" - Taylor Swift; "The Middle" - Zedd, Maren Morris, and Grey; "There's Nothing Holdin' Me Back" - Shawn Mendes; "Wolves" - Selena Gomez and Marshmello
Favorite Social Music Artist	Best Dance Track
Max & Harvey; Alex Aiono; Chloe x Halle; HRVY; Carson Lueders; Rudy Mancuso	"Mic Drop (Steve Aoki Remix)" - BTS; "Friends" - Justin Bieber and BloodPop; "Let Me Go" - Hailee Steinfeld and Alesso featuring Florida Georgia Line and Andrew Watt; "The Middle" - Zedd, Maren Morris, and Grey; "Silence - Marshmello featuring Khalid
Best New Artist	Best Collaboration
Bebe Rexha; Cheat Codes; Hey Violet; Lauv; Why Don't We	"It Ain't Me" - Selena Gomez and Kygo; "Meant to Be" - Bebe Rexha featuring Florida Georgia Line; "No Promises" - Cheat Codes featuring Demi Lovato; "Mi Gente" - J Balvin and Willy William; "The Middle" - Zedd, Maren Morris, and Grey
Best Crush Song	Fiercest Fans
"Perfect" - Ed Sheeran; "I Like Me Better" - Lauv; "Why" - Sabrina Carpenter; "Ins and Outs" - Sofia Carson; "Legends" - Kelsea Ballerini	BTS Army (BTS); Mellogang (Marshmello); Megatronz (Meghan Trainor); Mendes Army (Shawn Mendes); Selenators (Selena Gomez)
Best Song That Makes You Smile	Best Song to Lip Sync To
"DNA" - BTS; "I Miss Those Days" - Bleachers; "No Excuses" - Meghan Trainor; "One Foot" - Walk the Moon; "So Much More Than This" - Grace VanderWaal	"New Rules" - Dua Lipa; "Look What You Made Me Do - Taylor Swift; "Sorry Not Sorry" - Demi Lovato; "These Girls" - Why Don't We; "This Is Me" - Keala Settle
Country Favorite Artist	Country Best New Artist
Kelsea Ballerini; Luke Bryan; Florida Georgia Line; Maren Morris; Thomas Rhett	Carly Pearce; Jordan Davis; Devin Dawson; Jillian Jacqueline; Lanco
Country Favorite Song	Hero Award
"Meant to Be" - Bebe Rexha featuring Florida Georgia Line; "Legends" - Kelsea Ballerini; "Take Back Home Girl - Chris Lane and Tori Kelly; "Unforgettable" - Thomas Rhett; "You Broke Up with Me - Walker Hayes	Carrie Underwood
Icon Award
Kelly Clarkson
Janet Jackson Impact Award
Janet Jackson
