= 2017 Radio Disney Music Awards =

Annual US music awards ceremony

- Date: April 29, 2017 (ceremony); April 30, 2017 (air)
- Location: Microsoft Theater, Los Angeles, California
- Hosted by: Kelsea Ballerini; Sofia Carson; Jordan Fisher; Jenna Ortega; Alex Aiono

Highlights
- Most awards: Justin Bieber (2)
- Most nominations: Justin Bieber (7)
- Website: http://radio.disney.com/radio-disney-music-awards

Television/radio coverage
- Network: Radio Disney; Disney Channel
- Runtime: 99 minutes
- Viewership: 1.70 million
- Produced by: Den Of Thieves Productions

The 2017 Radio Disney Music Awards was held on April 29, 2017, at the Microsoft Theater in Los Angeles, California. The ceremony was shown on Radio Disney and Disney Channel the following night on April 30, 2017 from 7:00-9:00 p.m. (EDT).

== Production ==
On January 25, 2017, Radio Disney announced the five hosts of the 2017 edition: the singers Jordan Fisher, Kelsea Ballerini and Sofia Carson, the actress Jenna Ortega and Radio Disney's host Alex Aiono were chosen. The artists were chosen through a Twitter poll, where the audience indicated the names that should be invited. Tickets to attend the award show were available on March 3, 2017.

== Performances ==
Artist(s)	Song(s)
Jordan Fisher; Tally; Auliʻi Cravalho; Alessia Cara	"You're Welcome" "How Far I'll Go"
Hailee Steinfeld	"Most Girls" "Starving"
Julia Michaels	"Issues"
Kelsea Ballerini	"Love Me Like You Mean It" "Dibs" "Yeah Boy" "Peter Pan"
Noah Cyrus	"Make Me (Cry)" (Marshmello remix)
Lindsey Stirling	"Hold My Heart" (only violin)
Sabrina Carpenter	"Thumbs"
Kelsea Ballerini; Hailee Steinfeld; Sofia Carson; Jamie Lynn Spears	Tribute to Britney Spears "Oops!... I Did It Again" "Circus" "...Baby One More Time" "Till the World Ends"
Train	"Play That Song"
Alessia Cara	"Scars to Your Beautiful"
Grace VanderWaal	"I Don't Know My Name"
Erin Bowman	"Good Time Good Life"
Fitz and the Tantrums	"HandClap"

== Winners and nominees ==
- The nominees were announced on March 3, 2017.
- Winners are listed first and highlighted in **bold**.

Best Female Artist	Best Male Artist
**Ariana Grande**; Katy Perry; Lady Gaga; Meghan Trainor; Selena Gomez	**Niall Horan**; Bruno Mars; Justin Bieber; Nick Jonas; Shawn Mendes
Best Group (presented by Kraft Macaroni & Cheese Shapes)	Song of the Year
**Fifth Harmony**; DNCE; One Direction; The Chainsmokers; Twenty One Pilots	**"Treat You Better" - Shawn Mendes**; "Cake by the Ocean" - DNCE; "Can't Stop the Feeling!" - Justin Timberlake; "Closer" - The Chainsmokers featuring Halsey; "Sit Still, Look Pretty" - Daya
Favorite Social Media Star (presented by Lele Pons, Madison Hu and Olivia Rodrigo)	Breakout Artist of the Year (presented by Camila Cabello)
**Jake Paul**; Alex Aiono; Baby Ariel; Jacob Sartorius; Jiffpom	**Alessia Cara**; Daya; DNCE; Hailee Steinfeld; Kelsea Ballerini
Best New Artist (presented by Skylar Stecker and China Anne McClain)	Best Collaboration (presented by Bea Miller)
**Grace VanderWaal**; Jon Bellion; Jordan Fisher; Julia Michaels; Noah Cyrus	**"Bad Things" - Machine Gun Kelly and Camila Cabello**; "Beauty and the Beast" - Ariana Grande and John Legend; "I Don't Wanna Live Forever" - Taylor Swift and Zayn; "Just Hold On" - Steve Aoki and Louis Tomlinson; "We Don't Talk Anymore" - Charlie Puth featuring Selena Gomez
Best Crush Song	Fiercest Fans
**"Let Me Love You" - DJ Snake featuring Justin Bieber**; "On Purpose" - Sabrina Carpenter; "Starving" - Hailee Steinfeld and Grey featuring Zedd; "Wild" - Troye Sivan featuring Alessia Cara; "Yeah Boy" - Kelsea Ballerini	**Harmonizers (Fifth Harmony)**; Beliebers (Justin Bieber); Megatronz (Meghan Trainor); Mendes Army (Shawn Mendes); Selenators (Selena Gomez)
Best Song That Makes You Smile	Best Song to Lip Sync To (presented by Baby Ariel and Brent Rivera)
**"24K Magic" - Bruno Mars"**; "Can't Stop the Feeling!" - Justin Timberlake; "HandClap" - Fitz and the Tantrums; "Juju on That Beat" - Zay Hilfigerrr and Zayion McCall; "Me Too" - Meghan Trainor	**"Work" - Rihanna featuring Drake**; "Bacon" - Nick Jonas featuring Ty Dolla $ign; "Cake by the Ocean" - DNCE; "Closer" - The Chainsmokers featuring Halsey; "No" - Meghan Trainor
Best Song to Dance To	Best Breakup Song
**"Cold Water" - Major Lazer featuring Justin Bieber and MØ**; "Alone" - Marshmello; "Don't Let Me Down" - The Chainsmokers featuring Daya; "Millionaire" - Cash Cash and Digital Farm Animals featuring Nelly; "Never Forget You" - Zara Larsson and MNEK	**"Shout Out to My Ex" - Little Mix**; "I Hate U, I Love U" - Gnash featuring Olivia O'Brien; "Make Me (Cry)" - Noah Cyrus featuring Labrinth; "Sorry" - Justin Bieber; "We Don't Talk Anymore" - Charlie Puth featuring Selena Gomez
Favorite Tour	Country Favorite Artist (presented by Hayley Orrantia)
**Revival Tour - Selena Gomez**; 21 Tour - Hunter Hayes; Future Now Tour - Demi Lovato and Nick Jonas; Purpose World Tour - Justin Bieber; The Untouchable Tour - Meghan Trainor	**Kelsea Ballerini**; Dan + Shay; Florida Georgia Line; Maddie & Tae; Sam Hunt
Country Best New Artist	Country Favorite Song
**Maren Morris**; Lauren Alaina; Old Dominion; RaeLynn; Temecula Road	**"Peter Pan" - Kelsea Ballerini**; "80s Mercedes" - Maren Morris; "From the Ground Up" - Dan + Shay; "H.O.L.Y." - Florida Georgia Line; "Think of You" - Chris Young with Cassadee Pope
Hero Award (presented by Jack Black)
**Nick Jonas**
Icon Award (presented by Jamie Lynn Spears)
**Britney Spears**
