= Radio Disney Music Awards =

Former music award ceremony

- Radio Disney's "Golden Mickey" award trophys
- Sponsored by: Radio Disney
- Country: United States
- Reward: "Golden Mickey" trophy
- First award: December 23, 2001; 24 years ago
- Final award: June 16, 2019; 7 years ago
- Website: radio.disney.com/radio-disney-music-awards at the Wayback Machine (archived January 20, 2021)

Television/radio coverage
- Network: Radio Disney (radio); Disney Channel (television)
- Runtime: 150 minutes (radio); 120 minutes (television)

The Radio Disney Music Awards (also known as the ARDYs or RDMA) were an annual awards show operated by the American children's radio network Radio Disney. Beginning in 2001, the show was originally broadcast on Radio Disney only until 2007, when the awards show went on hiatus before returning in 2013. In 2014, it began to be televised on Disney Channel.

In 2019, the awards ceremony was renamed the "ARDYs". No awards ceremony was held in 2020 due to the COVID-19 pandemic, although a pre-recorded "ARDYs Summer Playlist" special aired that year. After Disney announced in December 2020 that Radio Disney would be shut down in the first quarter of 2021, with the network officially shutting down on April 14, 2021, the awards ceremony was quietly discontinued.

== History ==
The Radio Disney Music Awards honored the year's achievements in music, mainly in the teen pop genre, and were awarded based on popular vote from the network's listeners via online voting. The trophy awarded to a winner is known as the "Golden Mickey", a gold-colored statuette with a silhouette figure of Mickey Mouse wearing headphones nicknamed the "Ardy", representing Radio Disney's initials. The awards were first presented in 2001, but the ceremony was not televised beyond commercial interstitial segments for Disney Channel to promote their sister radio network. After 2007, the ceremony went on a five year hiatus until 2013. Starting in 2014, the ceremony began to be televised the day after it was held on a tape-delay, as the network attempted to compete with Nickelodeon's Kids' Choice Awards in airing awards programming. Starting in 2016, Canadians were able to vote for the first time as Disney programming, formerly under the control of Family Channel, moved to Disney-branded Corus Entertainment networks in both English and French when these networks launched in September 2015.

In 2019, the Radio Disney Music Awards were renamed ARDYs: A Radio Disney Music Celebration and aired live for the first time instead of on a tape-delay on June 16, 2019.

In 2020, a pre-recorded special, Radio Disney Presents ARDYs Summer Playlist, aired in place of an awards ceremony on July 10, 2020. Laura Marano served as the host.

== Awards events ==
| Year | Location |
|---|---|
| 2001 | Radio Disney; Burbank, California (Audio-only recording) |
| 2002 | Radio Disney; Burbank, California (Audio-only recording) |
| 2003 | Radio Disney; Burbank, California (Audio-only recording) |
| 2004 | Radio Disney; Burbank, California (Audio-only recording) |
| 2005 | Radio Disney; Burbank, California (Audio-only recording) |
| 2006 | Radio Disney; Burbank, California (Audio-only recording) |
| 2007 | Radio Disney; Burbank, California (Audio-only recording) |
| 2008–2012 | No ceremonies held |
| 2013 | Nokia Theatre/Microsoft Theater; Los Angeles |
| 2014 | Nokia Theatre/Microsoft Theater; Los Angeles |
| 2015 | Nokia Theatre/Microsoft Theater; Los Angeles |
| 2016 | Nokia Theatre/Microsoft Theater; Los Angeles |
| 2017 | Nokia Theatre/Microsoft Theater; Los Angeles |
| 2018 | Dolby Theatre; Los Angeles |
| 2019 | CBS Studio Center; Los Angeles |
| 2020 | Cancelled |

== Award categories ==
- Best Female Artist
- Best Male Artist
- Best Music Group
- Song of the Year
- Best New Artist
- Breakout Artist
- Artist with the Best Style
- Most Talked About Artist
- Best Artist Turned Singer
- Best Music Video
- Best Soundtrack Song
- Catchiest New Song
- Best Anthem
- Best Crush Song
- Song to Dance to
- Fiercest Fans
- Best Song That Makes You Smile
- Best Breakup Song
- Best Collaboration
- Best Song To Lip Sync To
- Favorite Country Artist
- Favortite Country Song
- Favorite New Country Artist
- Favorite Tour
- Favorite Social Media Star
- Favorite International Artist
- Best Album
- Best Homework Song
- Best Karaoke Song
- Best Song to Air Guitar
- Best Song to Watch Your Dad Sing
- Best Song to Rock Out to with Your BFF
- Funniest Celebrity Take
- Best Acoustic Performance
- Favorite Roadtrip Song
- Best Song That Makes You Turn Up the Radio
- Best TV Movie Song
- Best TV Show Song
- Most Rockin' Relative
- Best Song You Can't Believe Your Parents Know the Words To
- Best Song To Listen To While Getting Ready For School
- Best Song to Listen to on the Way to School
- Favorite TV Star Who Sings
- Best Group Made of Brothers / Sisters
- Best Dance Style
- Favorite Song Your Teacher Likes
- Best True Ringer Ring Tone
- Best Song From a Movie
- Best Song to Wake Up To
- Best Song You've Heard a Million Times and Still Love
- Best Song to Put on Repeat
- Best Song to Sing to an Ex

== Special awards ==
=== Impact Award ===
Impact Award is in recognition of an artist's influence on the world of entertainment and society, across generations of music enthusiasts.

- 2018: Janet Jackson

=== Hero Award ===
Hero Award is an honor for contribution for the charitable work.

- 2014: Shakira
- 2015: Jennifer Lopez
- 2016: Gwen Stefani
- 2017: Nick Jonas
- 2018: Carrie Underwood
- 2019: Avril Lavigne

=== Icon Award ===
Icon Award is an honor for the music contribution and influence with the teenagers by long-time career artists.

- 2017: Britney Spears
- 2018: Kelly Clarkson

=== Heroes for Change Award ===
Heroes for Change Award is an honor for young non-artists who make a difference in the world with charitable work.

- 2013: Mary Dawson, Ben Harowitz, Misha Ahmad, Dara Reyes and Denzell Perry.
- 2014: Arianna Lopez, Matthew Kaplan and Yossymar Rojas.
- 2016: Whitney Stewart and Braeden Mannering.

=== Other special awards ===
- 2014: Chart Topper Award to Ariana Grande for her impact on the charts.
- 2014: Show Stopper Award to R5 for their sold-out shows on the Louder World Tour.

== Achievements ==
Below are the rankings for the most wins and most nominated artist among female and male:

=== Most wins ===
| Rank | 1st | 2nd | 3rd |
|---|---|---|---|
| Artist | Hilary Duff | Fifth Harmony; Selena Gomez; Taylor Swift | Avril Lavigne; Miley Cyrus |
| Total | 18 | 8 | 7 |

=== Most nominations ===
This list features the most nominated individuals in the awards show's history, Hilary Duff is the most nominated performer with 35 nominations.

35 nominations

- Hilary Duff

22 nominations

- Vanessa Hudgens

21 nominations

- Avril Lavigne

19 nominations

- Ashley Tisdale

17 nominations

- Lindsay Lohan

16 nominations

- Miley Cyrus
- Selena Gomez
- Taylor Swift

15 nominations

- Zac Efron

14 nominations

- Justin Bieber
- Kelly Clarkson

11 nominations

- R5

10 nominations

- Ariana Grande
- JoJo
