= Teen Choice Award for Choice Music – Breakout Artist =

Entertainment award category

The following is a list of Teen Choice Award winners and nominees for Choice Breakout Artist. The award is sometimes divided into Choice Male Breakout Artist, Choice Female Breakout Artist and Choice Breakout Group.

== Winners and nominees ==
=== 1999 ===
Year	Winner	Nominees	Ref.
1999	98 Degrees	Eminem; Lauryn Hill; Ja Rule; Jordan Knight; Jennifer Lopez; *NSYNC; Britney Spears	

=== 2000s ===
Year	Winner	Nominees	Ref.
2000	Jessica Simpson	Marc Anthony; Blink-182; Filter; Macy Gray; Enrique Iglesias; Pink; Sisqó	
2001	O-Town	3LW; Dido; Dream; Eden's Crush; Nelly Furtado; Lifehouse; Samantha Mumba	
2002	Ashanti	B2K; Michelle Branch; The Calling; Vanessa Carlton; Craig David; Alicia Keys; Tweet	
2003	50 Cent	Beyoncé; Kelly Clarkson; Norah Jones; John Mayer; Sean Paul; Lisa Marie Presley; Justin Timberlake	
2004	Maroon 5	Clay Aiken; Hilary Duff; J-Kwon; Ruben Studdard; Kanye West; Mario Winans; Yellowcard	
2005	Choice Male Breakout Artist		
2005	Jesse McCartney	Ryan Cabrera; Gavin DeGraw; Frankie J; The Game; John Legend; T.I.; Rob Thomas	
2005	Choice Female Breakout Artist		
2005	Gwen Stefani	Amerie; Ciara; Fantasia; Lindsay Lohan; Natalie; Ashlee Simpson; Brooke Valentine	
2006	Choice Male Breakout Artist		
2006	Chris Brown	James Blunt; Gnarls Barkley; Taylor Hicks; Ne-Yo; Daniel Powter	
2006	Choice Female Breakout Artist		
2006	Rihanna	Natasha Bedingfield; LeToya; Katharine McPhee; Anna Nalick; Carrie Underwood	
2007	Choice Male Breakout Artist		
2007	Akon	Lloyd; Mika; Mims; Robin Thicke	
2007	Choice Female Breakout Artist		
2007	Vanessa Hudgens	Lily Allen; Corinne Bailey Rae; Katharine McPhee; Amy Winehouse	
2007	Choice Breakout Group		
2007	Gym Class Heroes	Daughtry; The Fray; Hinder; Shop Boyz	
2008	Choice Breakout Artist		
2008	Taylor Swift	Colbie Caillat; Flo Rida; Leona Lewis; Jordin Sparks	
2008	Choice Breakout Group		
2008	Jonas Brothers	Day 26; Girlicious; OneRepublic; Paramore	
2009	David Archuleta	David Cook; Kid Cudi; Lady Gaga; Asher Roth	

=== 2010s ===
Year	Winner	Nominees	Ref.
2010	Choice Male Breakout Artist		
2010	Justin Bieber	B.o.B; Jason Derulo; Drake; Nick Jonas & the Administration	
2010	Choice Female Breakout Artist		
2010	Selena Gomez & the Scene	Miranda Cosgrove; Ke$ha; Demi Lovato; Nicki Minaj	
2011	Bruno Mars	Adele; Javier Colon; Scotty McCreery; Wiz Khalifa	
2012	Choice Breakout Artist		
2012	Carly Rae Jepsen	Gotye; Ellie Goulding; Kimbra; Phillip Phillips	
2012	Choice Breakout Group		
2012	One Direction	Eli Young Band; fun.; Karmin; The Wanted	
2013	Choice Breakout Artist		
2013	Ed Sheeran	Candice Glover; Ariana Grande; Psy; Emeli Sandé	
2013	Choice Breakout Group		
2013	Emblem3	Icona Pop; Imagine Dragons; The Lumineers; Macklemore & Ryan Lewis	
2014	Choice Breakout Artist		
2014	Austin Mahone	Becky G; Rita Ora; Cody Simpson; Zendaya	
2014	Choice Breakout Group		
2014	5 Seconds of Summer	Fifth Harmony; MKTO; Rixton; The Vamps	
2015	Little Mix	Andy Grammer; Tove Lo; Rachel Platten; Meghan Trainor; The Weeknd	
2016	Zayn	Alessia Cara; DNCE; Bea Miller; Charlie Puth; Troye Sivan	
2017	Chance the Rapper	James Arthur; Halsey; Zara Larsson; Dua Lipa; Julia Michaels	
2018	Khalid	Bazzi; Lauv; Logic; Marshmello; SZA	
2019	Billie Eilish	HRVY; Juice Wrld; Lil Nas X; Lizzo; Rosalía	
