= Drama Queen (That Girl) =

Promotional single by Lindsay Lohan

from the album Confessions of a Teenage Drama Queen
- Released: January 2004
- Recorded: 2003
- Genre: Pop rock
- Length: 3:29
- Label: Hollywood
- Songwriters: Pam Sheyne; Bill Wolfe
- Producers: Matthew Gerrard; Mitchell Leib; Dawn Soler

Audio video
- "Drama Queen (That Girl)" on YouTube

"Drama Queen (That Girl)" is a song by Lindsay Lohan from the Confessions of a Teenage Drama Queen soundtrack. It was written by Pam Sheyne and Bill Wolfe, and produced by Matthew Gerrard, Dawn Soler and Mitchell Leib. The song appeared on the compilation albums, Radio Disney Jams, Vol. 7 and Radio Disney Chart Toppers. The song won "Best Song to Watch Your Dad Sing" at the 2004 Radio Disney Awards.

== Track listing ==
CD

1. "Drama Queen (That Girl) (radio edit)" – 3:16
2. "Drama Queen (That Girl) (call out hook)" – 0:31

== Music video ==
A promotional music video, directed by Declan Whitebloom, shows Lohan portraying different people performing the song in an audition, along with the promotional artwork for the movie and footage from the movie.
