= We're All in This Together (High School Musical song) =

Single by High School Musical cast

from the album High School Musical
- Released: October 16, 2006
- Recorded: 2005
- Genre: Dance-pop
- Length: 3:51
- Label: Walt Disney Records
- Songwriters: Matthew Gerrard; Robbie Nevil
- Producer: Matthew Gerrard

High School Musical singles chronology
"Get'cha Head in the Game" (2006)	"We're All in This Together" (2006)	"What Time Is It?" (2007)

"We're All in This Together" is a song from the Disney Channel Original Movie High School Musical and appears on the soundtrack of the same name. It features vocals from the cast of the movie including Vanessa Hudgens, Ashley Tisdale, Lucas Grabeel, and Drew Seeley, who sings for Zac Efron's character Troy Bolton. It was written by Matthew Gerrard and Robbie Nevil, with production credited Gerrard, and executively produced by Kenny Ortega, Bill Borden, and Barry Rosenbush. The song uses elements to simulate a school pep rally, such as a whistle and school band instruments. It also features a dance in the chorus iconic to the scene in the original movie. The song was released as the second single from the soundtrack on October 16, 2006 and is considered a signature song from the franchise.

== Composition ==
The song has a length of 3:51, has a tempo of 116 beats per minute, and has sections analyzed in the following keys, F♯ Mixolydian, D Mixolydian, E Mixolydian, F♯ major, and G Mixolydian. The song describes coming together despite there being differences between each other. It's used in the film during the finale number, where the whole cast comes together in the East High school's gymnasium to celebrate Troy Bolton scoring the winning point during the school's basketball championship. Certain cast members have solos throughout the song, with Seeley as Bolton having the first, Hudgens taking second, Grabeel taking third, Tisdale taking fourth, and the cast singing together for the song's main chorus and ending Wildcat's chant.

== Music video ==
A music video was released alongside the film for promotion on Disney Channel. The music video takes the scene from the movie where the song is performed, showing the whole ensemble dance with balloons on the floor and the audience engaging. It was also released with the special features on the DVD edition of the movie on May 26, 2006.

== Other versions ==
"We're All In This Together" has been covered several times in the film's other franchise installments. A remix version of the song was released with the 2-disc Special Edition of the film titled, The Remix Edition on December 5, 2006. A music video was included in the special edition which features behind-the-scenes footage from the movie and footage of the cast recording the song in a studio. The "Celebration Mix" was included in the third installment of the franchise's soundtrack on October 22, 2008. The cast for the Disney+ series High School Musical: The Musical: The Series covered the song during the season one finale and is included in the soundtrack.

The cast of the original film reunited during ABC Family's Disney Family Singalong on April 16, 2020 to sing together. It was used in the special to, "strengthen [the] spirits for those joining us for the broadcast", in response to the COVID-19 pandemic in 2020.

== Charts ==
Chart (2006–2007)	Peak position
Australia (ARIA)	86
Ireland (IRMA)	31
Italy (FIMI)	47
New Zealand (Recorded Music NZ)	14
Scotland Singles (Official Charts)	17
UK Singles (OCC)	40
US Billboard Hot 100	34
US Pop 100 (Billboard)	32

== Certifications ==
Region	Certification	Certified units/sales
New Zealand (RMNZ)	Gold	15,000^{‡}
United Kingdom (BPI)	Gold	400,000^{‡}
United States (RIAA)	Platinum	1,000,000^{‡}
^{‡} Sales+streaming figures based on certification alone.

== Release history ==
Region	Date	Format	Version	Label	Ref.
Various	October 16, 2006	Digital download	Original	Walt Disney Records	
Europe	November 27, 2006	CD single	Original	Walt Disney Records	
UK	December 15, 2006	CD single	Original	Walt Disney Records	
Various	December 11, 2007	Digital download	Remix	Walt Disney Records	
