= 2015 Radio Disney Music Awards =

Annual US music awards ceremony

- Date: April 25, 2015 (ceremony); April 26, 2015 (aired)
- Location: Microsoft Theater, Los Angeles, California
- Hosted by: Zendaya

Highlights
- Most awards: Ariana Grande (3)

Television/radio coverage
- Network: Radio Disney; Disney Channel
- Viewership: 2.14 million

The 2015 Radio Disney Music Awards were held and filmed on April 25, 2015, at the Microsoft Theater in Los Angeles, California. The show premiered on Sunday, April 26, 2015 at 8/7c on Radio Disney and Disney Channel. For the first time, the broadcast nominees for the awards show were announced in a televised special, Disney Channel Presents the 2015 RDMA Nomination Special, on 27 February 2015 on Disney Channel. All categories and nominees were highlighted on the Radio Disney’s 2015 RDMA Nomination Special, a two-hour on-air programming feature that was aired the next day.

The main show included Fifth Harmony, Nick Jonas, Becky G, R5, Natalie La Rose, Sheppard, Rachel Platten, Tori Kelly, Shawn Mendes and Sabrina Carpenter. The opening act was performed by The Fooo Conspiracy, Jessica Sanchez, Jacquie Lee, Sweet Suspense and Alex Angelo

== Performances ==
=== Pre-show ===
Artist(s)	Song(s)
The Fooo Conspiracy; Auliʻi Cravalho; Alessia Cara; Tally	"Roller Coaster"
Kelsea Ballerini	"Dibs"
Jacquie Lee	"Tears Fall"
Alex Angelo	"Move Like This"
Sweet Suspense	"Like a Girl"

=== Main show ===
Artist(s)	Song(s)
Natalie La Rose	"Somebody"
Fifth Harmony	"I Wanna Dance with Somebody (Who Loves Me)" / "Worth It"
Nick Jonas	"Chains" / "Jealous"
Sabrina Carpenter	"We'll Be The Stars" / "Eyes Wide Open"
Rachel Platten	"Fight Song"
Tori Kelly	"Nobody Love"
R5	"Smile" / "Let's Not Be Alone Tonight"
Becky G	"Lovin' So Hard" / "Shower"
Shawn Mendes	"Something Big"
Sheppard	"Geronimo"

== Presenters ==
- Ashley Benson
- Fifth Harmony
- Carly Rae Jepsen
- Chelsea Kane
- Joe Jonas
- The cast of Teen Beach 2:
  - Garrett Clayton
  - Grace Phipps
  - Chrissie Fit
- Sweet Suspense
- Kelsea Ballerini
- Laura Marano
- Rachel Platten
- The cast of Black-ish:
  - Yara Shahidi
  - Marcus Sribner
  - Miles Brown
  - Marsai Martin
- Rowan Blanchard
- Ben Savage
- Jacquie Lee
- Olivia Holt
- Dove Cameron
- The cast of Dancing with the Stars:
  - Rumer Willis
  - Val Chmerkovskiy
  - Chris Soules
  - Witney Carson
  - Carrie Ann Inaba
- Brent Rivera
- Jacob Whitesides
- Carla Maldonado
- Hailee Steinfeld
- Brooke Taylor
- Candace Huckeba
- The cast of The Fosters:
  - Maia Mitchell
  - David Lambert
  - Hayden Byerly
  - Cierra Ramirez
- The cast of K.C. Undercover:
  - Kadeem Hardison
  - Tammy Townsend
  - Veronica Dunne
  - Kamil Mcfadden
  - Trinitee Stokes

== Winners and nominees ==
The nominees were announced on February 27, 2015.

Best Female Artist	Best Male Artist
Ariana Grande; Meghan Trainor; Taylor Swift	Ed Sheeran; Nick Jonas; Pharrell Williams
Best Music Group	Best New Artist
Fifth Harmony; One Direction; 5 Seconds of Summer	Charli XCX; Echosmith; Shawn Mendes
Fiercest Fans	Song of the Year
Harmonizers - Fifth Harmony; Directioners - One Direction; R5Family - R5	"Problem" - Ariana Grande feat. Iggy Azalea; "All About That Bass" - Meghan Trainor; "Shake It Off" - Taylor Swift
Radio Disney's Most Talked About Artist	Best Collaboration
Ariana Grande @arianagrande; Taylor Swift @taylorswift13; 5 Seconds of Summer @5SOS	"Really Don't Care" - Demi Lovato feat. Cher Lloyd; "Wrapped Up" - Olly Murs feat. Travie McCoy; "Somebody To You" - The Vamps feat. Demi Lovato
Best Breakup Song	Best Crush Song
"The Heart Wants What It Wants" - Selena Gomez; "Really Don't Care" - Demi Lovato feat. Cher Lloyd; "Heartbreak Heard Around the World" - Jacob Latimore feat. T-Pain	"Can't Blame a Girl for Trying" - Sabrina Carpenter; "Jealous" - Nick Jonas; "Steal My Girl" - One Direction
Best Song to Rock Out to With Your BFF	Best Song That Makes You Smile
"Young Blood" - Bea Miller; "Cool Kids" - Echosmith; "Geronimo" - Sheppard	"Sugar" - Maroon 5; "Happy" - Pharrell Williams; "Smile" - R5
Catchiest New Song brought to you by Band-Aid	Best Song to Dance To
"Shower" - Becky G; "Boss" - Fifth Harmony; "Classic" - MKTO	"Shake It Off" - Taylor Swift; "All About That Bass" - Meghan Trainor; "Too Cool To Dance" - Eden xo
Artist with the Best Style	Hero Award
Becky G; Zendaya; Ariana Grande	Jennifer Lopez

== Compilation album ==
A compilation album featuring various 2015 RDMA nominees was released on April 21, 2015, through Walt Disney Records.

Radio Disney Music Awards
No.	Title	Writer(s)	Artist(s)	Length
1.	"All About That Bass" (RD Version)	Meghan Trainor; Kevin Kadish	Meghan Trainor	3:07
2.	"Problem" (featuring Iggy Azalea)	Ariana Grande; Max Martin; Savan Kotecha; Ilya Salmanzadeh; Amethyst Kelly	Ariana Grande	3:13
3.	"The Heart Wants What It Wants" (RD Version)	Selena Gomez; Antonina Armato; David Jost; Tim James	Selena Gomez	3:47
4.	"Chains" (RD Version)	Jason Evigan; Danny Parker; Ammar Malik	Nick Jonas	3:22
5.	"Boss" (RD Version)	Taylor Parks; Jacob Kasher Hindlin; Daniel Kyriakides; Eric Frederic; Joseph Spargur; Gamal Lewis	Fifth Harmony	2:50
6.	"Let's Not Be Alone (Alright)" (RD Version)	Savan Kotecha; Kristian Lundin; Johan Carlsson; Carl Falk	R5	2:54
7.	"Shower"	Lukasz Gottwald; Henry Walter; Rebbeca Gomez; Theron Thomas; Timothy Thomas	Becky G	3:26
8.	"Can't Blame a Girl for Trying"	Meghan Trainor; Al Anderson; Chris Gelbuda	Sabrina Carpenter	2:49
9.	"Cool Kids"	Echosmith; Jeffrey David; Jesiah Dzwonek	Echosmith	3:57
10.	"Really Don't Care" (featuring Cher Lloyd) (RD Version)	Carl Falk; Rami Yacoub; Savan Kotecha; Demi Lovato; Cher Lloyd	Demi Lovato	3:20
11.	"American Dream"	Malcolm David Kelly; Tony Oller; Emmanuel Kirakou; Andrew Goldstein; Nathan Charles Blasdell	MKTO	3:44
12.	"Somebody to You" (featuring Demi Lovato)	Savan Kotecha; Kristian Lundin; Carl Falk	The Vamps	3:02
13.	"Move Like This"	Alex Angelo; Dakari	Alex Angelo	3:12
14.	"Young Blood" (DJ Mike D Remix)	Mike Del Rio; Pheobe Ryan; Matt Parad; Beatrice Miller	Bea Miller	3:13
15.	"Wrapped Up" (Live)	Oliver Murs; Stephen Robson; Claude Kelly	Olly Murs	3:01
Total length:				49:09
