= 2013 Radio Disney Music Awards =

Annual US music awards

- Date: April 27, 2013
- Location: Nokia Theatre, Los Angeles, California
- Hosted by: Ariana Grande

Highlights
- Most awards: Taylor Swift and One Direction (2 each)

Television/radio coverage
- Network: Radio Disney

The 2013 Radio Disney Music Awards were held on April 27, 2013, at the Nokia Theatre L.A. Live in Los Angeles, California, after a five-year hiatus after 2007.

== Production ==
On March 15, 2013, The 2013 Radio Disney Music Awards was confirmed at Nokia Theatre L.A. Live, in Los Angeles, California. The awards would be held on April 27, at 6:00 pm. Tickets started selling on March 15, on Ticketmaster. The Radio Disney Music Awards contained 11 categories, with 3 to 5 nominees for votes in 4 weeks.

== Performers ==
Main Show
Performer(s)	Song
Austin Mahone	"Say Somethin"
Cher Lloyd	"With Ur Love"
Bridgit Mendler	"Hurricane"
Selena Gomez	"Come & Get It"
Cody Simpson	"Pretty Brown Eyes"
Coco Jones	"World is Dancing"
Mindless Behavior	"All Around The World"

After party
Performer(s)	Song
Fifth Harmony	"Anything Could Happen"

== Presenters ==
(in order of appearance)

- Jessica Sanchez & Jason DeRulo - presented Best Acoustic Performance
- Cody Simpson - presented Hero for Change Award to Scooter Braun
- Ross Lynch & Maia Mitchell - presented Best Crush Song
- Demi Lovato, on screen - introduced Cher Lloyd
- Tatyana Ali & China Anne McClain - presented Best Female Artist
- Austin Mahone & Trevor Jackson - presented Best Male Artist
- Bella Thorne - presented Melissa and IM5
- Melissa Peterman & IM5 - presented Funniest Celebrity Take
- Radio-Disney's Jake Whetter & Laura Marano - presented Best Breakup Song
- Megan & Liz - introduced Bridgit Mendler
- Olivia Holt & Trevor Bayne - presented Best Music Group
- Selena Gomez - Presented Heroes For Change To Sponsor Unicef
- Fifth Harmony - presented Song of the Year
- Leo Howard, Denise Richards, & Lola Sheen - presented Best Music Video
- Alli Simpson - introduced her brother
- Zendaya & Valentin Chmerkovskiy - presented Breakout Star
- Willow Shields - introduced Coco Jones
- Coco Jones - introduced Mindless Behavior
- Roshon Fegan & Ariana Grande - presented Fiercest Fans
- Ryan Seacrest, on screen - introduced Selena Gomez
- Debby Ryan - presented Hero for Change Award to Ben Harowiez for his work w/ Free the Children
- Caroline Sunshine & Adam Irigoyen - presented Hero for Change Award to Denzell Perry of the Boys and Girls Club

== Nominees and winners ==
On March 15, 2013 the nominations were announced.

=== Best Female Artist ===
- Selena Gomez
- Cher Lloyd
- Taylor Swift
- Bridgit Mendler

=== Best Male Artist ===
- Justin Bieber
- Cody Simpson
- Austin Mahone
- Bruno Mars

=== Song of the Year ===
- "I Knew You Were Trouble" – Taylor Swift
- "Beauty and a Beat" – Justin Bieber featuring Nicki Minaj
- "Live While We're Young" – One Direction
- "Want U Back" – Cher Lloyd

=== Best Music Group ===
- One Direction
- IM5
- Mindless Behavior
- R5

=== Breakout Star ===
- Austin Mahone
- IM5
- Ryan Beatty
- Cimorelli
- Christina Grimmie

=== Funniest Celebrity Take ===
- "Sandwich Rap" - Coco Jones
- "How To Audition" - Cher Lloyd
- "Air Guitar" - Ross Lynch

=== Best Music Video ===
- "Heard It on the Radio" – Ross Lynch
- "Ready or Not" - Bridgit Mendler
- "Fashion Is My Kryptonite" – Zendaya and Bella Thorne
- "Holla At The DJ" – Coco Jones

=== Best Breakup Song ===
- "We Are Never Ever Getting Back Together" – Taylor Swift
- "Want U Back" – Cher Lloyd
- "Payphone" – Maroon 5 featuring Wiz Khalifa
- "Wide Awake" – Katy Perry

=== Best Crush Song ===
- "Had Me @ Hello" – Olivia Holt
- "Wish You Were Here" – Cody Simpson featuring Becky G
- "Say You're Just a Friend" – Austin Mahone
- "Heart Skips a Beat" – Olly Murs

=== Best Acoustic Performance ===
- "Ready or Not" - Bridgit Mendler
- "Say Somethin" - Austin Mahone
- "Loud" - R5
- "Heart Skips a Beat" – Olly Murs

=== Fiercest Fans ===
- Directioners – One Direction
- Beliebers - Justin Bieber
- Mahomies - Austin Mahone
- Selenators - Selena Gomez
- Simpsonizers - Cody Simpson

== Heroes for Change Award ==
Mary Dawson, a 15-year-old student from Los Angeles, won the Heroes for Change for her charity work and her involvement with PressFriends, a project which teaches children how to write. Misha Ahmad, Denzell Perry, Dara Reyes and Ben Harowitz were the other honorees.
