= 2014 Radio Disney Music Awards =

Annual US music awards

- Date: April 26, 2014 (ceremony); April 27, 2014 (aired)
- Location: Nokia Theatre, Los Angeles, California
- Hosted by: Olivia Holt (stage); Dove Cameron (stage)

Highlights
- Most awards: Selena Gomez (3)

Television/radio coverage
- Network: Radio Disney and Disney Channel
- Viewership: 3.24

The 2014 Radio Disney Music Awards were held on April 26, 2014, at the Nokia Theatre L.A. Live in Los Angeles, California. The ceremony was edited and aired on April 27, 2014, on Radio Disney and Disney Channel. The big winner was Selena Gomez taking home 3 Ardys, including Song of the Year for "Come & Get It."

== Presenters and performers ==
=== Musical performers ===
Pre-show

- Sabrina Carpenter – "Can't Blame a Girl for Trying"
- McClain – "He Loves Me"
- The Vamps – "Last Night"
- Alex Angelo – "It's Your Night"

Main show

- Ariana Grande – "Problem"
- R5 – "(I Can't) Forget About You"
- Fifth Harmony – "Miss Movin' On"
- Zendaya – "Replay"
- Becky G – "Can't Get Enough"
- Austin Mahone – "Mmm Yeah"

Post-show

- Aaliyah Rose - "Let it Go"

=== Presenters ===
- Spencer Boldman
- Dove Cameron
- Emblem3
- The cast of Girl Meets World
  - Rowan Blanchard
  - Sabrina Carpenter
  - Ben Savage
  - Danielle Fishel
- Nolan Gould
- Lucy Hale
- Olivia Holt
- Julianne Hough
- Laura Marano
- McClain
- Maia Mitchell
- Kelly Osbourne
- Emily Osment
- Jason Ritter
- Jessica Sanchez
- Cody Simpson
- Booboo Stewart
- The Vamps
- Tyrel Jackson Williams

== Nominees ==
On February 22, 2014, the nominations were announced.

=== Best Female Artist ===
- Demi Lovato
- Katy Perry
- Taylor Swift

=== Best Male Artist ===
- Justin Timberlake
- Cody Simpson
- Austin Mahone

=== Best Music Group ===
- One Direction
- Emblem3
- R5

=== Breakout Artist ===
- Fifth Harmony
- Ariana Grande
- Zendaya

=== Best New Artist ===
- Becky G
- Celeste Buckingham
- The Vamps*

=== Song of the Year ===
- "Come & Get It" - Selena Gomez
- "Roar" - Katy Perry
- "Best Song Ever" - One Direction

=== Best Crush Song ===
- "Still Into You" - Paramore
- "Chloe (You're the One I Want)" - Emblem3
- "What About Love" - Austin Mahone

=== Fiercest Fans ===
- Swifties - Taylor Swift
- Directioners - One Direction
- Katycats - Katy Perry

=== Best Musical Collaboration ===
- "Everything Has Changed" - Taylor Swift feat. Ed Sheeran
- "Popular Song" - Mika feat. Ariana Grande
- "Clarity" - Zedd feat. Foxes

=== Best Song to Rock Out to With Your BFF ===
- "Me & My Girls" - Fifth Harmony
- "Here's to Never Growing Up" - Avril Lavigne
- "Loud" - R5

=== Best Song That Makes You Smile ===
- "Ooh La La" - Britney Spears
- "La Da Dee" - Cody Simpson
- "The Fox (What Does the Fox Say?)" - Ylvis

=== Radio Disney's Most Talked About Artist ===
- Selena Gomez
- Ariana Grande
- Austin Mahone

=== Catchiest New Song ===
- "The Fox (What Does the Fox Say?)" - Ylvis
- "Classic" - MKTO
- "I Wish" - Cher Lloyd

=== Favorite Song from a Movie or TV Show ===
- "Let It Go" - Idina Menzel (Frozen)
- "Crusin' For a Brusin'" - Ross Lynch (Teen Beach Movie)
- "Ooh La La" - Britney Spears (The Smurfs 2)

=== Best Song to Dance To ===
- "Birthday" - Selena Gomez
- "Dance with Me Tonight" - Olly Murs
- "Wings" - Little Mix

=== Favorite Roadtrip Song ===
- "Made in the USA" - Demi Lovato
- "Best Day of My Life" - American Authors
- "Pass Me By" - R5

=== Artist with the Best Style ===
- Zendaya
- Austin Mahone
- Becky G

== Special award ==
=== Hero Award ===
Shakira received the Hero Award, an honor for contribution to charitable work.

=== Heroes for Change Award ===
Arianna Lopez, Matthew Kaplan and Yossymar Rojas were honored for contribution for their charitable work.

=== Other special awards ===
- Ariana Grande was honored with the Chart Topper Award for her great performance on the charts.
- R5 was honored with the Show Stopper Award for their sold-out shows on Louder Tour.
