= 2016 Radio Disney Music Awards =

Annual US music awards ceremony

- Date: April 30, 2016 (ceremony); May 1, 2016 (aired)
- Location: Microsoft Theater, Los Angeles, California
- Preshow hosts: Brooke Taylor; Alex Aiono

Highlights
- Most awards: Taylor Swift (3)

Television/radio coverage
- Network: Radio Disney; Disney Channel
- Viewership: 2.24 million

The 2016 Radio Disney Music Awards were held and filmed on April 30, 2016, at the Microsoft Theater in Los Angeles, California. The ceremony premiered on Sunday, May 1, 2016 at 7/6c on Radio Disney and Disney Channel. Scooter Braun was announced as creative executive-producer this year. This year's show also introduced new categories including Country Music Awards in honor of the newly opened Radio Disney Country station.

== Production ==
Radio Disney DJ Brooke Taylor and American singer Alex Aiono were announced as the red carpet presenters. On April 28, 2016, Radio Disney and Disney Channel announced that it had partnered with Immersive Media Company, a virtual reality company, to live-stream the red carpet. The virtual content was viewable on tablets and mobile devices.

== Performances ==
| Artist(s) | Song(s) |
|---|---|
| Flo Rida | "My House" |
| Ariana Grande | "Dangerous Woman" |
| Hailee Steinfeld; Hudson Thames; Joe Jonas | "Love Myself" / "How I Want Ya'" / "Rock Bottom" |
| Jordan Smith | "Stand in the Light" |
| Sabrina Carpenter | "Smoke and Fire" |
| Laura Marano | "Boombox" |
| Sofia Carson | "Love Is the Name" |
| Justin Bieber | "Love Yourself" (previously recorded in a special pocket show) |
| Kelsea Ballerini | "Peter Pan" |
| Daya | "Hide Away" |
| Gwen Stefani | "Make Me Like You" |
| Zara Larsson | "Never Forget You" |
| DNCE | "Cake by the Ocean" |

== Presenters ==
- Justin Bieber
- Laura Marano
- Vanessa Marano
- Katherine McNamara
- Emeraude Toubia
- Jacob Whitesides
- Cameron Boyce
- Maddie & Tae
- Fall Out Boy
- Forever In Your Mind
- Dove Cameron
- Jasmine Thompson
- Pharrell Williams
- Sonika Vaid
- Dan + Shay
- Alli Simpson
- Lennon & Maisy
- Mark Cuban
- The cast of Black-ish:
  - Yara Shahidi
  - Marcus Scribner
  - Miles Brown
  - Marsai Martin
- Ben Savage
- Alessia Cara
- Jordan Fisher
- Rachel Platten
- Erin Andrews
- Ashley Benson
- Ashley Tisdale
- Skai Jackson
- Alyson Stoner
- Sabrina Carpenter
- Sofia Carson
- Daya

== Winners and nominees ==
The nominees were announced on March 4, 2016. The winners were revealed on April 30, 2016.

| Best Female Artist | Best Male Artist |
|---|---|
| Selena Gomez; Adele; Meghan Trainor; Taylor Swift | Justin Bieber; Nick Jonas; Shawn Mendes; Ed Sheeran |
| Best Music Group | Song of the Year |
| Fifth Harmony; Fall Out Boy; One Direction; R5 | "Bad Blood" - Taylor Swift; "Cheerleader" - OMI; "Stitches" - Shawn Mendes; "Watch Me (Whip/Nae Nae)" - Silento |
| Breakout Artist of the Year | Best New Artist |
| Tori Kelly; Alessia Cara; Charlie Puth; Rachel Platten | Kelsea Ballerini; DNCE; Daya; Nathan Sykes |
| Fiercest Fans | Best Song That Makes You Smile |
| Harmonizers (Fifth Harmony); Beliebers (Justin Bieber); Directioners (One Direction); Swifties (Taylor Swift) | "Better When I'm Dancin'" - Meghan Trainor; "Cheerleader" - OMI; "I Don't Like It, I Love It" - Flo Rida feat. Robin Thicke & Verdine White |
| Best Crush Song | Best Song To Lip Sync To |
| "Perfect" - One Direction; "Love Me Like You Do" - Ellie Goulding; "One Call Away" - Charlie Puth; "Should've Been Us" - Tori Kelly | "What Do You Mean?" - Justin Bieber; "Cake by the Ocean" - DNCE; "Dessert" - Dawin feat. Silento; "Gibberish" - Max Schneider feat. Hoodie Allen |
| Best Anthem | Best Song To Dance To |
| "Eyes Wide Open" - Sabrina Carpenter; "Cake by the Ocean" - DNCE; "Confident" - Demi Lovato; "Honey, I'm Good." - Andy Grammer | "Focus" - Ariana Grande; "Break a Sweat" - Becky G; "Uma Thurman" - Fall Out Boy; "Watch Me (Whip/Nae Nae)" - Silento |
| Best Breakup Song | Radio Disney's Most Talked About Artist |
| "Bad Blood" - Taylor Swift; "Hello - Adele; "Sorry" - Justin Bieber; "Stitches" - Shawn Mendes | Taylor Swift; Justin Bieber; One Direction |
| Artist With The Best Style | Country Favorite Artist |
| Becky G; Gwen Stefani; Taylor Swift; Zendaya | Maddie & Tae; Hunter Hayes; Kelsea Ballerini; Sam Hunt |
| Country Favorite Song | Hero Award |
| "Fly" - Maddie & Tae; "Dibs" - Kelsea Ballerini; "God Made Girls" - RaeLynn; "Nothin' Like You" - Dan + Shay | Gwen Stefani |
