= 2001 Radio Disney Music Awards =

Annual US music awards

- Date: December 23, 2001
- Location: Radio Disney, Burbank, California
- Hosted by: Sterling Sulieman

Television/radio coverage
- Network: Radio Disney
- Viewership: G

The 2001 Radio Disney Music Awards were held on December 23, 2001, at the Radio Disney studios. It was the first edition of the award.

== Production ==
At that time the Radio Disney Music Awards was not an official ceremony but just a special edition on the Radio Disney broadcast. It was held on December 23, 2001. The Radio Disney Music Awards contained 9 categories, with 3 nominees for votes in 4 weeks.

== Nominees and winners ==
List of categories and winners in 2001.

=== Best Female Artist ===
- Mandy Moore
- Britney Spears
- Jessica Simpson

=== Best Male Artist ===
- Aaron Carter
- Bow Wow
- Lil' Romeo

=== Best Music Group ===
- Backstreet Boys
- *NSYNC
- Play

=== Best Song ===
- "I Wanna Be with You" – Mandy Moore
- "Aaron's Party (Come Get It)" – Aaron Carter
- "Shape of My Heart" – Backstreet Boys

=== Best Album ===
- Black & Blue – Backstreet Boys
- Aaron's Party (Come Get It) – Aaron Carter
- I Wanna Be with You – Mandy Moore

=== Best Homework Song ===
- "I Can't Wait" – Hilary Duff
- "I Wanna Be with You" – Mandy Moore
- "My Baby" – Lil' Romeo

=== Best Soundtrack Song ===
- "I Can't Wait" – Hilary Duff
- "It's Raining Men" – Geri Halliwell
- "Little Bitty Pretty One" – Aaron Carter

=== Best Style ===
- Amanda Bynes
- Kirsten Storms
- Melissa Joan Hart

=== Most Talked About Artist ===
- Amanda Bynes
- Andrew Lawrence
- Hilary Duff
