= 2002 Radio Disney Music Awards =

Annual US music awards

- Date: November 16, 2002
- Location: Radio Disney, Burbank, California
- Hosted by: Sterling Sulieman

Television/radio coverage
- Network: Radio Disney
- Viewership: G

The 2002 Radio Disney Music Awards were held on November 16, 2002, at the Radio Disney studios. It was the second edition of the award.

== Production ==
At that time the Radio Disney Music Awards was not an official ceremony. It was a special feature on Radio Disney held on November 16, 2002. The Radio Disney Music Awards contained 6 categories, with 3 nominees for votes in 4 weeks.

== Nominees and winners ==
List of categories and winners in 2002.

=== Best Female Artist ===
- Avril Lavigne
- Jessica Simpson
- Britney Spears

=== Best Male Artist ===
- Aaron Carter
- Lil' Romeo
- Bow Wow

=== Best Song ===
- "Complicated" – Avril Lavigne
- "Girlfriend" – 'N Sync
- "Not Too Young, Not Too Old" – Aaron Carter

=== Best Album ===
- Let Go – Avril Lavigne
- Irresistible – Jessica Simpson
- Oh Aaron – Aaron Carter

=== Best Homework Song ===
- "Complicated" – Avril Lavigne
- "Girlfriend" – 'N Sync
- "Not Too Young, Not Too Old" – Aaron Carter

=== Best Style ===
- Hilary Duff
- Amanda Bynes
- Melissa Joan Hart
