= 2006 Radio Disney Music Awards =

Annual US music awards

- Date: December 11, 2006
- Location: Radio Disney, Burbank, California
- Hosted by: None

Television/radio coverage
- Network: Radio Disney
- Viewership: G

The 2006 Radio Disney Music Awards were held on December 11, 2006, at the Radio Disney, Burbank, California.

== Production ==
At that time, the Radio Disney Music Awards weren't a ceremony, it was a special edition on the Radio Disney broadcast. On November 16, 2006 the nominations were announced. The awards would be held on December 11, 2006. The Radio Disney Music Awards contained 21 categories, with 3 to 4 nominees for votes in 4 weeks.

== Nominees and winners ==
=== Best Female Artist ===
- Miley Cyrus
- Kelly Clarkson
- Rihanna
- Vanessa Hudgens

=== Best Male Artist ===
- Jesse McCartney
- Chris Brown
- Bow Wow
- Billie Joe Armstrong

=== Favorite TV Star Who Sings ===
- Miley Cyrus
- Vanessa Hudgens
- Alyson Michalka
- Raven-Symoné

=== Best Group ===
- The Cheetah Girls
- Aly & AJ
- Jonas Brothers
- B5

=== Best Group Made of Brothers / Sisters ===
- Aly & AJ
- Jonas Brothers
- B5
- Everlife

=== Best Song ===
- "The Best of Both Worlds" – Miley Cyrus
- "We're All in This Together" – High School Musical Cast
- "Breaking Free" – Vanessa Hudgens and Zac Efron
- "SOS" – Rihanna

=== Best New Artist ===
- Miley Cyrus
- Vanessa Hudgens
- Zac Efron
- Lucas Grabeel

=== Best Team Anthem ===
- We're All in This Together" by High School Musical Cast
- "Get'cha Head In The Game" – B5
- "U Can’t Touch This" – MC Hammer
- "We Are the Champions" – Crazy Frog

=== Best Dance Style ===
- The Cheetah Girls
- Chris Brown
- B5
- High School Musical

=== Best Song To Listen To While Getting Ready For School ===
- "I Got Nerve" – Miley Cyrus
- "Rush" – Aly & AJ
- "Start Of Something New" – Vanessa Hudgens and Zac Efron
- "Unwritten" – Natasha Bedingfield

=== Favorite Karaoke Song ===
- "Too Little Too Late" – JoJo
- "The Best of Both Worlds" – Miley Cyrus
- We're All in This Together" – High School Musical Cast
- "Breaking Free" – Vanessa Hudgens and Zac Efron

=== Favorite Song Your Teacher Likes ===
- Too Little Too Late" – JoJo
- "Crazy" – Gnarls Barkley
- "Gonna Make U Sweat" – C+C Music Factory
- "So Sick" – Ne-Yo

=== Best True Ringer Ring Tone ===
- "Breaking Free" – Vanessa Hudgens and Zac Efron
- "Too Little Too Late" – JoJo
- "Confessions of a Broken Heart (Daughter to Father)" – Lindsay Lohan
- We're All in This Together" – High School Musical Cast

=== Best Video That Rocks ===
- "Come Back to Me" – Vanessa Hudgens
- "Year 3000" – Jonas Brothers
- "The Best of Both Worlds" – Miley Cyrus
- "Chemicals React" – Aly & AJ

=== Best Song to Play While Doing Homework ===
- "Get'cha Head In The Game" – B5
- "Start Of Something New" – Vanessa Hudgens and Zac Efron
- "U Can’t Touch This" – MC Hammer
- "Confessions of a Broken Heart (Daughter to Father)" – Lindsay Lohan

=== Best Song to Wake Up To ===
- "Step Up" – The Cheetah Girls
- "Start Of Something New" – Vanessa Hudgens and Zac Efron
- "The Best of Both Worlds" – Miley Cyrus
- "Too Little Too Late" – JoJo

=== Best Song From a Movie ===
- "Life Is a Highway" – Rascal Flatts
- We're All in This Together" – High School Musical Cast
- "Breaking Free" – Vanessa Hudgens and Zac Efron
- "Bop to the Top" – Ashley Tisdale and Lucas Grabeel

=== Best Song to Dance To ===
- "Strut" – The Cheetah Girls
- "Step Up" – The Cheetah Girls
- We're All in This Together" – High School Musical Cast
- "Beat of My Heart" – Hilary Duff

=== Best Song You've Heard a Million Times and Still Love ===
- "Since U Been Gone" – Kelly Clarkson
- "Too Little Too Late" – JoJo
- "Confessions of a Broken Heart (Daughter to Father)" – Lindsay Lohan
- "Come Back to Me" – Vanessa Hudgens

=== Best Song to Put on Repeat ===
- "The Best of Both Worlds" – Miley Cyrus
- We're All in This Together" – High School Musical Cast
- "Come Back to Me" – Vanessa Hudgens
- "Confessions of a Broken Heart (Daughter to Father)" – Lindsay Lohan

=== Most Stylish Singer ===
- Miley Cyrus
- Vanessa Hudgens
- Alyson Michalka
- Raven-Symoné
