= 2007 Radio Disney Music Awards =

Annual US music awards

- Date: December 22, 2007
- Location: Radio Disney, Burbank, California

Television/radio coverage
- Network: Radio Disney
- Viewership: G

The 2007 Radio Disney Music Awards were held on December 22, 2007, at the Radio Disney, Burbank, California. After this edition the awards started a hiatus of four years after the 2008 awards.

== Production ==
At that time the Radio Disney Music Awards wasn't an official ceremony but just a special edition on the Radio Disney broadcast and held on December 22, 2007. The Radio Disney Music Awards contained 15 categories, with 4 nominees for votes in 4 weeks.

== Nominees and winners ==
List of categories and winners in 2007.

=== Best Female Artist ===
- Hilary Duff
- Avril Lavigne
- Miley Cyrus
- Kelly Clarkson

=== Best Male Artist ===
- Jesse McCartney
- Corbin Bleu
- Justin Timberlake
- Zac Efron

=== Best Group ===
- Jonas Brothers
- Aly & AJ
- Everlife
- The Cheetah Girls

=== Best New Artist ===
- Ashley Tisdale
- Drake Bell
- Jonas Brothers
- Miranda Cosgrove

=== Best Song ===
- "With Love" – Hilary Duff
- "Girlfriend" – Avril Lavigne
- "See You Again" – Miley Cyrus
- "He Said She Said" – Ashley Tisdale

=== Best Artist Turned Singer ===
- Amanda Bynes
- Ashley Tisdale
- Drake Bell
- Miranda Cosgrove

=== Best Top 40 Artist ===
- Hilary Duff
- Avril Lavigne
- Kelly Clarkson
- Vanessa Hudgens

=== Best Team Anthem ===
- "Fabulous" – Ashley Tisdale and Lucas Grabeel
- "Makes Me Happy" – Drake Bell
- "SOS" – Jonas Brothers
- "You Are the Music in Me" – Vanessa Hudgens, Zac Efron and Olesya Rulin

=== Best Video That Rocks ===
- "Stranger" – Hilary Duff
- "Girlfriend" – Avril Lavigne
- "He Said She Said" – Ashley Tisdale
- "Say OK" – Vanessa Hudgens

=== Best Soundtrack Song ===
- "Gotta Go My Own Way" – Vanessa Hudgens and Zac Efron
- "Push It to the Limit" – Corbin Bleu
- "What Time Is It?" – High School Musical 2 cast
- "Without Love" – Amanda Bynes

=== Best Song to Dance ===
- "Girlfriend" – Avril Lavigne
- "He Said She Said" – Ashley Tisdale
- "Never Again" – Kelly Clarkson
- "With Love" – Hilary Duff

=== Best Song to Wake Up To ===
- "Leave It All to Me" – Miranda Cosgrove
- "Never Again" – Kelly Clarkson
- "Outta My Head (Ay Ya Ya)" – Ashlee Simpson
- "What Time Is It?" – High School Musical 2 cast

=== Best song to Sing to an Ex ===
- "With Love" – Hilary Duff
- "Girlfriend" – Avril Lavigne
- "Never Again" – Kelly Clarkson
- "Potential Breakup Song" – Aly & AJ

=== Most Stylish Singer ===
- Amanda Bynes
- Ashley Tisdale
- Miley Cyrus
- Vanessa Hudgens

=== Most Talked About Artist ===
- Amanda Bynes
- Ashley Tisdale
- Avril Lavigne
- Gwen Stefani
