= 2004 Radio Disney Music Awards =

Annual US music awards

- Date: October 25, 2004
- Location: Radio Disney, Burbank, California
- Hosted by: Sterling Sulieman

Television/radio coverage
- Network: Radio Disney
- Viewership: G

The 2004 Radio Disney Music Awards was an awards show held Radio Disney studios. Hilary Duff, as in 2003, was the biggest winner that year. The award was broadcast on the Radio Disney network.

== Nominees and winners ==
=== Best Female Artist ===
- Hilary Duff
- Avril Lavigne
- JoJo

=== Best Male Artist ===
- Usher
- Lil' Romeo
- Justin Timberlake

=== Best Group ===
- Black Eyed Peas
- Maroon 5
- The Cheetah Girls

=== Best Song ===
- "Come Clean" – Hilary Duff
- "Don't Tell Me" – Avril Lavigne
- "Leave (Get Out)" – JoJo

=== Best New Artist ===
- Ashlee Simpson
- JoJo
- Lindsay Lohan

=== Best Actress Turned Singer ===
- Hilary Duff
- Lindsay Lohan
- Mandy Moore

=== Best Song to Watch Your Dad Sing ===
- "Drama Queen (That Girl)" – Lindsay Lohan
- "The Little Voice" – Hilary Duff
- "Pieces of Me" – Ashlee Simpson

=== Best TV Movie Song ===
- "Cinderella" – Cheetah Girls
- "What Dreams Are Made Of" – Hilary Duff
- Drama Queen (That Girl)" – Lindsay Lohan

=== Best Homework Song ===
- "The Math" – Hilary Duff
- "Breakaway" – Kelly Clarkson
- "Cinderella" – Cheetah Girls

=== Best Song to Air Guitar ===
- "My Happy Ending" – Avril Lavigne
- "Breakaway" – Kelly Clarkson
- "The Little Voice" – Hilary Duff

=== Best Video That Rocks ===
- "Leave (Get Out)" – JoJo
- "Breakaway" – Kelly Clarkson
- "Come Clean" by Hilary Duff

=== Best Song to Dance ===
- "Let's Get It Started" by Black Eyed Peas
- "Cinderella" – Cheetah Girls
- "Girl Power – Cheetah Girls

=== Most Rockin' Relative ===
- Hilary Duff and Haylie Duff
- Cheetah Girls

=== Most Stylish Singer ===
- Hilary Duff
- Amanda Bynes
- Lindsay Lohan
