= 2005 Radio Disney Music Awards =

Annual US music awards

- Date: December 11, 2005
- Location: Radio Disney, Burbank, California
- Hosted by: Sterling Sulieman

Television/radio coverage
- Network: Radio Disney
- Viewership: G

The 2005 Radio Disney Music Awards were held at the Radio Disney, studios. Aly & AJ was the biggest winner that year. The award show was broadcast on the Radio Disney network.

== Nominees and winners ==
=== Best Female Artist ===
- Hilary Duff
- Lindsay Lohan
- JoJo

=== Best Male Artist ===
- Jesse McCartney
- Lil' Romeo
- Justin Timberlake

=== Best Actress Turned Singer ===
- Raven-Symoné
- Emma Roberts
- Hayden Panettiere

=== Best Song ===
- "Wake Up" – Hilary Duff
- "Rumors" – Lindsay Lohan
- "Beautiful Soul" – Jesse McCartney

=== Best Soundtrack Song ===
- "Shake a Tail Feather" – Cheetah Girls (The Cheetah Girls)
- "First" – Lindsay Lohan (Herbie: Fully Loaded)
- "Fly" – Hilary Duff (Raise Your Voice)

=== Best TV Movie Song ===
- "Rush" – Aly & AJ (Twitches)
- "Good Life" – Jesse McCartney (A Cinderella Story)
- "My Hero Is You" – Hayden Panettiere (Tiger Cruise)

=== Best TV Show Song ===
- "Follow Me" – Jamie Lynn Spears (Zoey 101)
- "Found a Way" – Drake Bell (Drake & Josh)
- "Dummy" – Emma Roberts (Unfabulous)

=== Best Song You Can't Believe Your Parents Know the Words To ===
- "Do You Believe in Magic" – Aly & AJ
- "Beautiful Soul" – Jesse McCartney
- "Wake Up" – Hilary Duff

=== Best Song to Listen to on the Way to School ===
- "Walking on Sunshine" – Aly & AJ
- "Rumors" – Lindsay Lohan
- "Wake Up" – Hilary Duff

=== Most Stylish Singer ===
- Amanda Bynes
- Hilary Duff
- Lindsay Lohan
