= 2003 Radio Disney Music Awards =

Annual US music awards

- Date: 2003
- Location: Radio Disney, Burbank, California
- Hosted by: Sterling Sulieman

Television/radio coverage
- Network: Radio Disney
- Viewership: G

The 2003 Radio Disney Music Awards was held at the Radio Disney studios. Hilary Duff was the biggest winner that year. Like the shows before, it was not a ceremony, but a special feature on Radio Disney

== Nominees and winners ==
=== Best Female Artist ===
- Hilary Duff
- Avril Lavigne
- Jessica Simpson

=== Best Male Artist ===
- Lil' Romeo
- Aaron Carter
- Bow Wow

=== Best Group ===
- Destiny’s Child
- Atomic Kitten
- The Cheetah Girls

=== Best Song ===
- "So Yesterday" – Hilary Duff
- "The Tide Is High (Get the Feeling)" – Atomic Kitten
- "Play Like Us" – Lil' Romeo

=== Best Song to Sing Hairbrush Karaoke ===
- "Miss Independent" – Kelly Clarkson
- "So Yesterday" – Hilary Duff
- "Play Like Us" – Lil' Romeo

=== Best Song to Watch Your Dad Sing ===
- "Naked Mole Rap" – Ron Stoppable and Rufus
- "Play Like Us" – Lil' Romeo
- "The Tide Is High (Get the Feeling)" – Atomic Kitten

=== Best Song That Makes You Turn Up the Radio ===
- "So Yesterday" – Hilary Duff
- "Miss Independent" – Kelly Clarkson
- "I'm with You" – Avril Lavigne

=== Best Song to Air Guitar ===
- "Sk8er Boi" – Avril Lavigne
- "Girl Can Rock" – Hilary Duff
- "Ultimate" – Lindsay Lohan

=== Best Video That Rocks ===
- "So Yesterday" – Hilary Duff
- "Sk8er Boi" – Avril Lavigne
- "Miss Independent" – Kelly Clarkson

=== Best Song to Dance ===
- "What I Like About You" – Lillix
- "So Yesterday" – Hilary Duff
- "Ultimate" – Lindsay Lohan

=== Female with Most Style ===
- Hilary Duff
- Amanda Bynes
- Lindsay Lohan

=== Male with Most Style ===
- Justin Timberlake
- Aaron Carter
- Lil' Romeo
