= List of awards and nominations received by Meghan Trainor =

Meghan Trainor awards and nominations
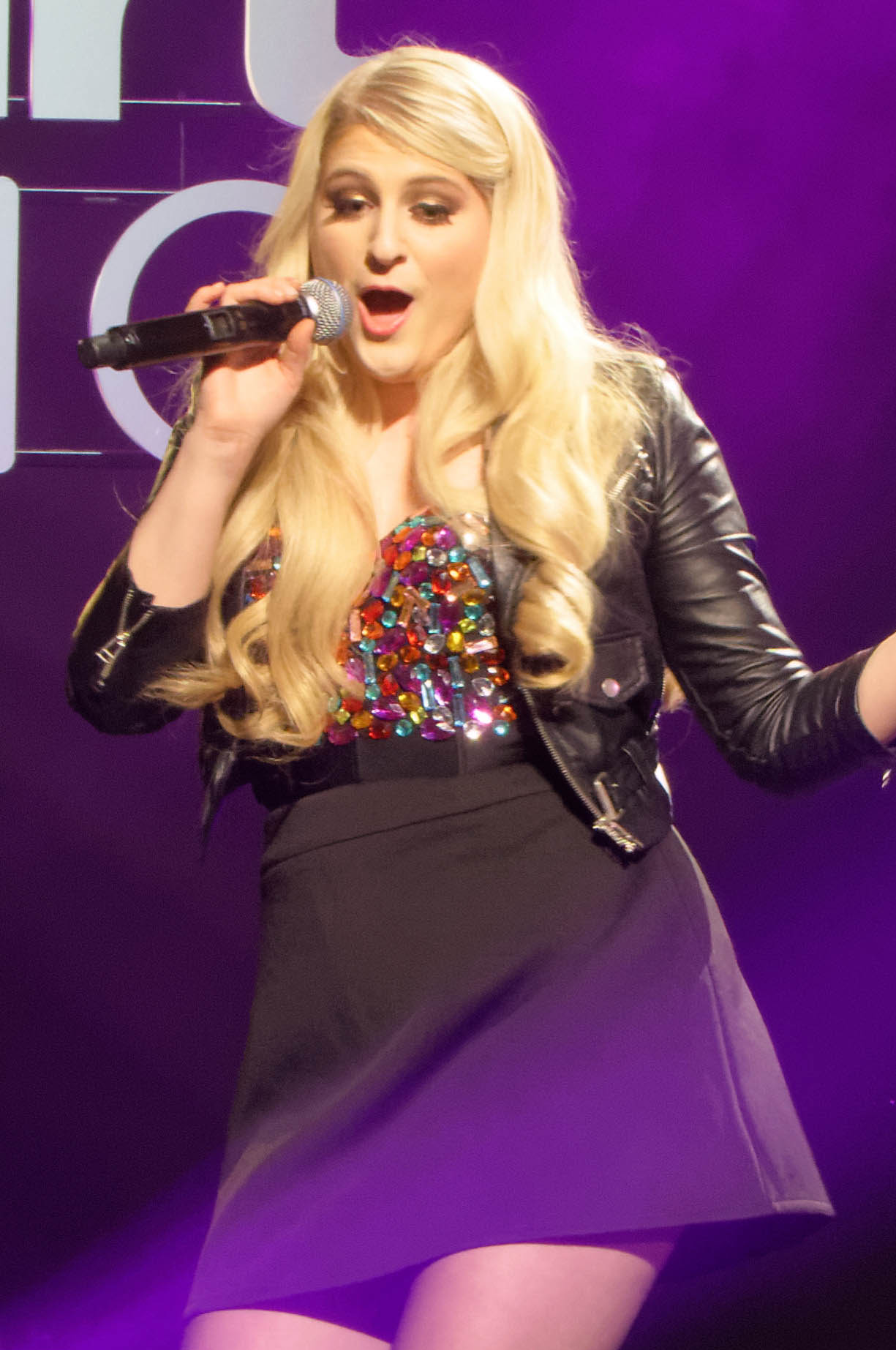
- Trainor performing on the Jingle Ball Tour 2014 at the Wells Fargo Center in December 2014
Awards and nominations
Award	Wins	Nominations
American Music Awards	0	6
ARIA	0	2
Billboard	2	7
Brit	0	1
CMT	0	1
Grammy	1	3
Juno	0	1
MTV Europe	0	1
ASCAP Pop Music Awards	4	0
Billboard Women in Music	2	0
Dorian Awards	0	1
Global Awards	0	3
Hollywood Music in Media Awards	0	2
iHeartRadio Music Awards	0	7
Japan Gold Disc Award	1	0
Latin American Music Awards	0	1
LOS40 Music Awards	1	1
Music Business Association	1	0
NewNowNext Awards	0	1
Nickelodeon Kids' Choice Awards	0	6
Nickelodeon Mexico Kids' Choice Awards	0	2
People's Choice Awards	1	3
Radio Disney Music Awards	1	12
Streamy Awards	1	1
Teen Choice Awards	0	5
World Soundtrack Awards	0	5
YouTube Music Awards	1	0

Totals (Note: Certain award groups do not simply award one winner. They acknowledge several different recipients, have runners-up, and have third place. Since this is a specific recognition and is different from losing an award, runner-up mentions are considered wins in this award tally. For simplification and to avoid errors, each award in this list has been presumed to have had a prior nomination.)
- Wins: 17
- Nominations: 67

American singer-songwriter Meghan Trainor has received 15 awards from 67 nominations. Trainor signed a record deal with Epic Records in 2014 and released her debut single "All About That Bass", which earned her Grammy nominations for Record of the Year, and Song of the Year. The song also received an ASCAP Pop Music Award and Billboard Music Awards for both Top Hot 100 Song and Top Digital Song. Trainor's follow-up single, "Lips Are Movin", earned her a nomination for Choice Break-Up song at the Teen Choice Awards. She was recognized by the Music Business Association as the Breakthrough Artist of the Year in 2015. Trainor released her major-label debut album Title that year. It won Favorite Album at the 42nd People's Choice Awards. In 2016, Trainor won the Grammy Award for Best New Artist and received a nomination for Brit Award for International Female Solo Artist.

Trainor has received two nominations at the Hollywood Music in Media Awards for her soundtrack songs "Better When I'm Dancin'" and "I'm a Lady". Trainor's second major-label studio album Thank You was preceded by its lead single "No". The song earned nominations for Favorite Song at the 43rd People's Choice Awards, Best Song to Lip Sync to at the 2017 Radio Disney Music Awards, as well as Choice Music Single: Female at the 2016 Teen Choice Awards. Her song "Me Too" received nominations for Favorite Music Video and Best Song That Makes You Smile at the 2017 Kids' Choice Awards and the 2017 Radio Disney Music Awards respectively. The singer earned nominations for Choice TV Personality at the 2018 Teen Choice Awards for her work on The Four: Battle for Stardom, as well as Fiercest Fans, and Best Song That Makes You Smile for "No Excuses" at the 2018 Radio Disney Music Awards.

== Awards and nominations ==
Award	Year (Note: Indicates the year of ceremony. Each year is linked to the article about the awards held that year, wherever possible.)	Recipient(s) and nominee(s)	Category	Result	Ref.
American Music Awards	2014	Meghan Trainor	New Artist of the Year	Nominated	
American Music Awards	2015	Meghan Trainor	Favorite Pop/Rock Female Artist	Nominated	
American Music Awards	2015	Meghan Trainor	Favorite Adult Contemporary Artist	Nominated	
American Music Awards	2016	Meghan Trainor	Favorite Adult Contemporary Artist	Nominated	
American Music Awards	2016	"Like I'm Gonna Lose You" (with John Legend)	Collaboration of the Year	Nominated	
ARIA Music Awards	2015	Meghan Trainor	Best International Artist	Nominated	
ARIA Music Awards	2016	Meghan Trainor	Best International Artist	Nominated	
ASCAP Pop Music Awards	2015	"All About That Bass"	Most Performed Songs	Won	
ASCAP Pop Music Awards	2016	"Lips Are Movin"	Most Performed Songs	Won	
ASCAP Pop Music Awards	2016	"Like I'm Gonna Lose You" (with John Legend)	Most Performed Songs	Won	
ASCAP Pop Music Awards	2017	Meghan Trainor	ASCAP Vanguard Award	Won	
ASCAP Pop Music Awards	2024	"Made You Look"	Most Performed Pop Songs	Won	
Billboard Music Awards	2015	Meghan Trainor	Top New Artist	Nominated	
Billboard Music Awards	2015	Meghan Trainor	Top Female Artist	Nominated	
Billboard Music Awards	2015	Meghan Trainor	Top Hot 100 Artist	Nominated	
Billboard Music Awards	2015	Meghan Trainor	Chart Achievement	Nominated	
Billboard Music Awards	2015	Meghan Trainor	Top Digital Songs Artist	Nominated	
Billboard Music Awards	2015	Meghan Trainor	Top Streaming Artist	Nominated	
Billboard Music Awards	2015	"All About That Bass"	Top Hot 100 Song	Won	
Billboard Music Awards	2015	"All About That Bass"	Top Digital Song	Won	
Billboard Music Awards	2015	"All About That Bass"	Top Streaming Video	Nominated	
Billboard Women in Music	2016	Meghan Trainor	Chart-Topper Award	Won	
Billboard Women in Music	2025	Meghan Trainor	Hitmaker Award	Won	
Brit Awards	2016	Meghan Trainor	International Female Solo Artist	Nominated	
Brit Awards	2024	"Made You Look"	International Song	Nominated	
CMT Music Awards	2017	Shania Twain songs (Note: "You're Still the One","Any Man of Mine", and "Man! I Feel Like a Woman!" (with Jill Scott and Kelsea Ballerini))	Performance of the Year	Nominated	
Dorian Awards	2015	"All About That Bass"	Music Video of the Year	Nominated	
Global Awards	2023	Meghan Trainor	Best Female	Nominated	
Global Awards	2023	"Made You Look"	Best Social Trended Song	Nominated	
Global Awards	2023	"Made You Look"	Best Song	Nominated	
Grammy Awards	2015	"All About That Bass"	Record of the Year	Nominated	
Grammy Awards	2015	"All About That Bass"	Song of the Year	Nominated	
Grammy Awards	2016	Meghan Trainor	Best New Artist	Won	
Hollywood Music in Media Awards	2015	"Better When I'm Dancin'"	Original Song – Animated Film	Nominated	
Hollywood Music in Media Awards	2017	"I'm a Lady"	Original Song – Animated Film	Nominated	
iHeartRadio Music Awards	2015	Meghan Trainor	Best New Artist	Nominated	
iHeartRadio Music Awards	2015	Meghan Trainor	Renegade	Nominated	
iHeartRadio Music Awards	2015	"All About That Bass"	Song of the Year	Nominated	
iHeartRadio Music Awards	2016	Meghan Trainor	Female Artist of the Year	Nominated	
iHeartRadio Music Awards	2016	"Like I'm Gonna Lose You" (with John Legend)	Best Collaboration	Nominated	
iHeartRadio Music Awards	2020	"I'll Be There for You"	Best Cover	Nominated	
iHeartRadio Music Awards	2023	"Made You Look"	TikTok Bop of the Year	Nominated	
Japan Gold Disc Awards	2016	Meghan Trainor	Best 3 New Artists (Western)	Won	
Juno Awards	2016	Title	International Album of the Year	Nominated	
Latin American Music Awards	2016	Meghan Trainor	Artista Favorito – Crossover	Nominated	
LOS40 Music Awards	2015	Meghan Trainor	Best International New Artist	Won	
LOS40 Music Awards	2015	"All About That Bass"	Best International Video	Nominated	
MTV Europe Music Awards	2014	"All About That Bass"	Best Song with a Social Message	Nominated	
Music Business Association	2015	Meghan Trainor	Breakthrough Artist of the Year	Won	
NewNowNext Awards	2014	Meghan Trainor	Best New Musician (Female)	Nominated	
Nickelodeon Kids' Choice Awards	2015	"All About That Bass"	Favorite Song of the Year	Nominated	
Nickelodeon Kids' Choice Awards	2015	Meghan Trainor	Favorite New Artist	Nominated	
Nickelodeon Kids' Choice Awards	2016	Meghan Trainor	Favorite Female Singer	Nominated	
Nickelodeon Kids' Choice Awards	2016	"Like I'm Gonna Lose You" (with John Legend)	Favorite Collaboration	Nominated	
Nickelodeon Kids' Choice Awards	2017	Meghan Trainor	Favorite Female Singer	Nominated	
Nickelodeon Kids' Choice Awards	2017	"Me Too"	Favorite Music Video	Nominated	
Nickelodeon Mexico Kids' Choice Awards	2023	Meghan Trainor	Favorite Global Artist	Nominated	
Nickelodeon Mexico Kids' Choice Awards	2023	"Made You Look"	Global Hit of the Year	Nominated	
People's Choice Awards	2015	Meghan Trainor	Favorite Breakout Artist	Nominated	
People's Choice Awards	2015	"All About That Bass"	Favorite Song	Nominated	
People's Choice Awards	2016	Title	Favorite Album	Won	
People's Choice Awards	2017	"No"	Favorite Song	Nominated	
Radio Disney Music Awards	2015	Meghan Trainor	Best Female Artist	Nominated	
Radio Disney Music Awards	2015	"All About That Bass"	Best Song to Dance to	Nominated	
Radio Disney Music Awards	2015	"All About That Bass"	Song of the Year	Nominated	
Radio Disney Music Awards	2016	Meghan Trainor	Best Female Artist	Nominated	
Radio Disney Music Awards	2016	"Better When I'm Dancin'"	Best Song That Makes You Smile	Won	
Radio Disney Music Awards	2017	Meghan Trainor	Best Female Artist	Nominated	
Radio Disney Music Awards	2017	Megatronz	Fiercest Fans	Nominated	
Radio Disney Music Awards	2017	"Me Too"	Best Song That Makes You Smile	Nominated	
Radio Disney Music Awards	2017	"No"	Best Song To Lip Sync To	Nominated	
Radio Disney Music Awards	2017	The Untouchable Tour	Favorite Tour	Nominated	
Radio Disney Music Awards	2018	Meghan Trainor	Best Artist	Nominated	
Radio Disney Music Awards	2018	Megatronz	Fiercest Fans	Nominated	
Radio Disney Music Awards	2018	"No Excuses"	Best Song That Makes You Smile	Nominated	
Streamy Awards	2023	"Made You Look"	Rolling Stone Sound of the Year	Won	
Teen Choice Awards	2015	"All About That Bass"	Choice Music Single: Female	Nominated	
Teen Choice Awards	2015	"Lips Are Movin"	Choice Break-Up Song	Nominated	
Teen Choice Awards	2015	Meghan Trainor	Choice Music: Breakout Artist	Nominated	
Teen Choice Awards	2016	"No"	Choice Music Single: Female	Nominated	
Teen Choice Awards	2018	The Four: Battle for Stardom	Choice TV Personality	Nominated	
World Soundtrack Awards	2016	"Better When I'm Dancin'"	Best Original Song Written Directly for a Film	Nominated	
YouTube Music Awards	2015	Meghan Trainor	50 artists to watch	Won	
