= Guild of Music Supervisors Award for Best Song Written and/or Recording Created for a Film =

The Best Song Written and/or Recorded for a Film award is annually presented at the Guild of Music Supervisors Awards to honor the song records directly created for feature films. It was first given at their sixth annual awards function, and has continued to be ever since.

== Winners and nominees ==
=== 2010s ===
Year	Film	Song	Composers	Recording Artists	Music Supervisor	Ref
2015	Furious 7	"See You Again"	DJ Frank E, Charlie Puth, Wiz Khalifa, and Andrew Cedar	Wiz Khalifa featuring Charlie Puth	Rachel Levy	
2015	Fifty Shades of Grey	"Love Me Like You Do"	Savan Kotecha, Ilya Salmanzadeh, Tove Lo, Max Martin, and Ali Payami	Ellie Goulding	Dano Sampson	
2015	Love & Mercy	"One Kind of Love"	Brian Wilson and Scott Bennett	Brian Wilson	—N/a	
2015	Meru	"The Light That Never Fails"	Adrian Gurvitz, Andra Day, and Lauren Christy	Andra Day	Tracy McKnight	
2015	The Peanuts Movie	"Better When I'm Dancin'"	Meghan Trainor and Thaddeus Dixon	Meghan Trainor	John Houlihan	
2015	Pitch Perfect 2	"Flashlight"	Sia Fuller, Christian Guzman, Jason Moore, and Sam Smith	Hailee Steinfeld	Julia Michels and Julianne Jordan	
2016	La La Land	"City of Stars"	Justin Hurwitz, Benj Pasek, and Justin Paul	Emma Stone and Ryan Gosling	Steven Gizicki	
2016	Alice Through the Looking Glass	"Just Like Fire"	Alecia Moore, Max Martin, Karl Johan Schuster, and Oscar Holter	P!nk	Mitchell Leib and Kaylin Frank	
2016	Sing Street	"Drive It Like You Stole It"	Gary Clark	Ferdia Walsh-Peelo	Becky Bentham	
2016	Suicide Squad	"Heathens"	Tyler Joseph	Twenty One Pilots	Season Kent and Gabe Hilfer	
2016	Trolls	"Can't Stop the Feeling!"	Justin Timberlake, Max Martin, and Karl Johan Schuster	Justin Timberlake	Julia Michels and Julianna Jordan	
2017	Call Me By Your Name	"Mystery of Love"	Sufjan Stevens	Sufjan Stevens	Robin Urdang	
2017	Coco	"Remember Me"	Kristen Anderson-Lopez and Robert Lopez	Miguel featuring Natalia Lafourcade	Tom MacDougall	
2017	Ferdinand	"Home"	Nick Jonas, Nick Monson, and Justin Tranter	Nick Jonas	Julianna Jordan	
2017	The Greatest Showman	"This Is Me"	Benji Pasek and Justin Paul	Keala Settle	Benji Paesk and Justin Paul	
2017	Mudbound	"Mighty River"	Mary J. Blige, Raphael Saadiq, and Taura Stinson	Mary J. Blige	Evyen Klean and Jennifer Reeve	
2018	A Star Is Born	"Shallow"	Stefani Germanotta, Mark Ronson, Anthony Rossomando, and Andrew Wyatt	Lady Gaga and Bradley Cooper	Julia Michels and Julianne Jordan	
2018	Black Panther	"All the Stars"	Kendrick Lamar, Anthony Tiffith, Mark Anthony Spears, Alexander William Shuckburgh, and Solána Rowe	Kendrick Lamar and SZA	Dave Jordan	
2018	Dumplin'	"Girl in the Movies"	Dolly Parton and Linda Perry	Dolly Parton	Buck Damon	
2018	Mary Poppins Returns	"Trip a Little Light Fantastic"	Marc Shaiman and Scott Wittman	Lin-Manuel Miranda, Emily Blunt, Tarik Frimpong, Pixie Davies, Joel Dawson, Nathanael Saleh, and Leeries	Michael Higham and Paul Gemignani	
2018	Spider-Man: Into the Spider-Verse	"Sunflower"	Khalif Brown, Louis Bell, Austin Post, William Walsh, Carter Lang, and Carter Rosen	Post Malone and Swae Lee	Kier Lehman	
2019	Bombshell	"One Little Soldier"	Regina Spektor	Regina Spektor	Evyen Klean	
2019	Charlie's Angels	"Don't Call Me Angel"	Alma-Sofia Miettinen, Ariana Grande, Ilya Salmanzadeh, Elizabeth Grant, Max Martin, Miley Cyrus, and Savan Kotecha	Ariana Grande, Lana Del Rey, and Miley Cyrus	Julianna Jordan and Julia Michel	
2019	Frozen 2	"Into the Unknown"	Kristen Anderson-Lopez and Robert Lopez	Idina Menzel featuring AURORA	Tom MacDougall	
2019	The Lion King	"Spirit"	Beyoncé, Ilya Salmanzadeh, and Timothy McKenzie	Beyoncé	Mitchell Leib	
2019	Wild Rose	"Glasgow (No Place Like Home)"	Caitlyn Smith, Kate York, and Mary Steenburgen	Jessie Buckley	Karen Elliott	

=== 2020s ===
Year	Film	Song	Composers	Recording Artists	Music Supervisor	Ref
2020	The Trial of the Chicago 7	"Hear My Voice"	Celeste Waite and Daniel Pemberton	Celeste	Peter Afterman and Alison Litton	
2020	All In: The Fight for Democracy	"Turntables"	George “George 2.0” A. Peters II, Janelle "Django Jane" Monáe, and Nathaniel Irvin III	Janelle Monáe	Andrew Gross	
2020	The High Note	"Love Myself"	Greg Kurstin and Sarah Aarons	Tracee Ellis Ross	Linda Cohen	
2020	Jingle Jangle: A Christmas Journey	"Make It Work"	John Stephens	Forest Whitaker and Anika Noni Rose	Julia Michels	
2020	Onward	"Carried Me with You"	Brandi Carlile, Phil Hanseroth, and Tim Hanseroth	Brandi Carlile	Tom MacDougall	
2021	Encanto	"Dos Oruguitas"	Lin-Manuel Miranda	Sebastián Yatra	Tom MacDougall	
2021	Flag Day	"My Father's Daughter"	Glen Hansard and Eddie Vedder	Eddie Vedder, Glen Hansard, and Olivia Vedder	Tracy McKnight	
2021	The Harder They Fall	"Guns Go Bang"	Jeymes Samuel, Scott Mescudi, and Shawn Carter	Kid Cudi and Jay-Z	Michelle Silverman	
2021	King Richard	"Be Alive"	Beyoncé and Dixson	Beyoncé	Susan Jacobs	
2021	Shang-Chi and the Legend of the Ten Rings	"Fire in the Sky"	Anderson .Paak, Bruno Mars, Son Tzu, Rogét Chahayed, Wesley Singerman, Taylor Dexter, and Alissia Benveniste	Anderson .Paak	Dave Jordan	
2022	Everything Everywhere All at Once	"This Is a Life"	Ryan Lott, David Byrne, and Mitski Miyawaki	David Byrne, Mitski, and Son Lux	Lauren Marie Mikus and Bruce Gilbert	
2022	Black Panther: Wakanda Forever	"Lift Me Up"	Robyn Fenty, Ludwig Göransson, Ryan Coogler, and Temilade Openiyi	Rihanna	Dave Jordan	
2022	Catherine Called Birdy	"Honey to the Bee"	James Marr and Wendy Page	Misty Miller	Jen Malone and Nicole Weisberg	
2022	Elvis	"Vegas"	Jerry Leiber, Mike Stoller, Amala Dlamini, David Sprecher, and Rogét Chahayed	Doja Cat	Anton Monsted	
2022	A Jazzman's Blues	"Paper Airplanes"	Ruth Berhe and Terence Blanchard	Ruth B.	Joel C. High	
2022	Minions: The Rise of Gru	"Turn Up the Sunshine"	Jack Antonoff, Sam Dew, Patrik Berger, and Kevin Parker	Diana Ross and Tame Impala	Mike Knobloch and Rachel Levy	
2022	The Return of Tanya Tucker	"Ready As I'll Never Be"	Tanya Tucker and Brandi Carlile	Tanya Tucker and Brandi Carlile	Jill Meyers and Drew Bayers	
2022	Top Gun: Maverick	"Hold My Hand"	Lady Gaga and BloodPop	Lady Gaga	Randy Spendlove	
2022	The Valet	"A Song in My Heart"	Gaby Moreno and Heitor Pereira	Gaby Moreno	Howard Paar	
2022	Where the Crawdads Sing	"Carolina"	Taylor Swift	Taylor Swift	Spring Aspers	
2023	Barbie	"What Was I Made For?"	Billie Eilish O'Connell and Finneas O'Connell	Billie Eilish	George Drakoulias	
2023	American Symphony	"It Never Went Away"	Jon Batiste and Dan Wilson	Jon Batiste	Priya Autrey	
2023	Barbie	"I'm Just Ken"	Mark Ronson and Andrew Wyatt	Ryan Gosling	George Drakoulias	
2023	The Hunger Games: The Ballad of Songbirds & Snakes	"Can't Catch Me Now"	Dan Nigro and Olivia Rodrigo	Olivia Rodrigo	Hillary Holmes	
2023	Joy Ride	"Juicy"	Isak Alvedahl, Kirubel Swedin, and Sandra Wikstrom	Ramengvrl	Toko Nagata	
2023	Past Lives	"Quiet Eyes"	Zachary Dawes and Sharon Van Etten	Sharon Van Etten	Meghan Currier	
2023	Rustin	"Road to Freedom"	Lenny Kravitz	Lenny Kravitz	Barry Cole	
2023	Spider-Man: Across the Spider-Verse	"Am I Dreaming"	Mike Dean, Peter Lee Johnson, Rakim Mayers, Roisee, Leland Wayne, and Landon Wayne	Metro Boomin, ASAP Rocky, and Roisee	Kier Lehman	
2023	Theater Camp	"Camp Isn't Home"	Noah Galvin, Molly Gordon, Nick Lieberman, Ben Platt, and Mark Sonnenblick	Alexander Bello, Bailee Bonick, Donovan Colan, Noah Galvin, Molly Gordon, Luke Islam, Madisen Lora, Kyndra Sanchez, Jack Sobolewski, and Quinn Titcomb	Lindsay Wolfington	
2023	Totally Killer	"Little Bit O' Soul"	John Carter and Kenneth Hawker	The Linda Lindas	Toko Nagata	
2024	Sing Sing	"Like a Bird"	Abraham Alexander, Brandon Marcel, and Adrian Quesada	Abraham Alexander and Adrian Quesada	Dan Wilcox	
2024	The Idea of You	"The Idea of You"	Carl Falk, Savan Kotecha, and Albin Nedler	Anne-Marie and Nicholas Galitzine	Frankie Pine	
2024	Shirley	"Why I'm Here"	Samara Joy and Paul Sylvester Morton Jr.	Samara Joy	Madonna Wade-Reed	
2024	The Six Triple Eight	"The Journey"	Diane Warren	H.E.R.	Joel C. High	
2024	Twisters	"Out of Oklahoma"	Luke Dick, Shane McAnally, and Lainey Wilson	Lainey Wilson	Rachel Levy	
2024	The Wild Robot	"Kiss the Sky"	Delacey, Jordan Johnson, Stefan Johnson, Maren Morris, Michael Pollack, and Ali Tamposi	Maren Morris	Natalie Hayden	
2025	Sinners	"I Lied to You"	Ludwig Göransson and Raphael Saadiq	Miles Caton	Niki Sherrod	
2025	Bridget Jones: Mad About the Boy	"It Isn't Perfect But It Might Be"	Olivia Dean and Matthew Hales	Olivia Dean	Nick Angel	
2025	Diane Warren: Relentless	"Dear Me"	Diane Warren	Kesha	Heather Guibert	
2025	F1	"Just Keep Watching"	Amy Allen, Tate McRae, Tyler Spry, and Ryan Tedder	Tate McRae	David Taylor and Jake Voulgarides	
2025	Materialists	"My Baby (Got Nothing At All)"	Michelle Chongmi Zauner	Japanese Breakfast	Meghan Currier	
2025	Sinners	"Last Time (I Seen the Sun)"	Miles Caton, Ludwig Göransson, and Alice Smith	Miles Caton, Ludwig Göransson, and Alice Smith	Niki Sherrod	
