= The Peanuts Movie (Original Motion Picture Soundtrack) =

2015 soundtrack album by various artists

Soundtrack album by Various artists
- Released: October 23, 2015
- Recorded: 2014–2015
- Venues: Newman Scoring Stage, Twentieth Century Fox Studios
- Genre: Film soundtrack
- Length: 49:38
- Labels: Epic Records; Fox Music
- Producers: Bryan Schulz; Craig Schulz

Vince Guaraldi chronology
Peanuts Greatest Hits (2015)	The Peanuts Movie (Original Motion Picture Soundtrack) (2015)	A Boy Named Charlie Brown: Original Motion Picture Soundtrack (2017)

Christophe Beck chronology
Ant-Man (2015)	The Peanuts Movie (2015)	Sisters (2015)

Singles from The Peanuts Movie (Original Motion Picture Soundtrack)
- 1. "Better When I'm Dancin'" Released: October 14, 2015

The Peanuts Movie (Original Motion Picture Soundtrack) is the soundtrack album to the 2015 animated film The Peanuts Movie, directed by Steve Martino and produced by Blue Sky Studios. Based on Charles M. Schulz's comic strip Peanuts, it is the fifth full-length Peanuts film, and the first in 35 years. The original score is composed by Christophe Beck, with contributions from jazz pianist David Benoit and Meghan Trainor, who performed an original song titled "Better When I'm Dancin', released as a single on October 14, 2015. The soundtrack was digitally released by Epic Records and Fox Music on October 23, 2015.

Beck wanted to interpret Vince Guaraldi's compositions for the Peanuts specials (scored by Guaraldi between 1963 and 1976) to give a "nostalgic feel" in the score. The score was recorded by early 2014 with sessions held during April–August 2015 at the Newman Scoring Stage, 20th Century Fox Studios. The album features 20 tracks, including Trainor's single, Flo Rida's "That's What I Like" featuring Fitz. Three original tracks performed by the Vince Guaraldi Trio from A Charlie Brown Christmas (1965) were also included: "Linus and Lucy", "Skating" and "Christmas Time Is Here". Beck's original score occupies the remainder of the album. An exclusive edition of the soundtrack released at Target features a second Trainor track, "Good to Be Alive", and the Japanese edition of the soundtrack includes "Good to Be Alive" and three more tracks from Beck's score. The album was positively received by critics.

== Development ==
"With the Peanuts movies, I grew up on those specials from the '60s and '70s, that, of course, rerun to this day. I'm very fond of all that Vince Guaraldi music, so what we did was try to find spots in the film where we could sort of touch down and remind people who were watching the film that it's still a Peanuts movie, and there's still a place for that music in the film. There's a bunch of spots where we quote the Guaraldi music, or we actually re-record his pieces quite faithfully."

— Christophe Beck

Following his inclusion as the score composer, Christophe Beck said that he grew up on the Peanuts specials and the music by Vince Guaraldi. In a different approach, he stated the score would be more orchestral than Guaraldi's previous scores, which were mainly a small jazz combo, and the musical landscape is different. Beck had said that, there needs a lot of attention while composing for family-drama films, where the score might vary in regard to various emotions. He stated that "to score it with a combo might make you and me and others of our generation feel warm and nostalgic, but to most everyone else it would just feel a bit old fashioned. That said, I tried where I could to evoke the feel of those old specials, just because I love them so much! So every once in a while I try to drop in that classic piano combo sound."

Jazz pianist David Benoit contributed to Beck's score, and had recorded all the piano solos for the film during the final sessions. He managed to re-create several tunes composed by Guaraldi, especially the theme song "Linus and Lucy". Beck added that, "It is impossible to imagine one without the other [...] It's tuneful, it's catchy, and he [Benoit] manages to incorporate both sophisticated jazz harmonies and a sense of melancholy." In an interview to Los Angeles Times, Benoit had added that recreating "Linus and Lucy" was "not like playing Liszt" but "tricky" as Guaraldi had improvised those tunes, and played differently each time. He added "Vince [Guaraldi] listened to a lot of Latin music, and I think that's where he developed that syncopation between right and left hand. ... It sounds easy but when you try to play it right, it's very tricky."

The scoring sessions took place at the Newman Scoring Stage in 20th Century Fox Studios from April to August 2015. Tim Davies led the 79-piece orchestra, consisting of varied instruments: string, French horn, woodwinds, brass, violin, cello, harp, piano and percussions. Additional music is composed by Leo Birenberg and Zach Robinson. Martino said about the music of the film, adding "There's a lot of history to the music of the Peanuts film, and he embraced the philosophy Craig and I had on the movie, which was to tell a feature film story with these characters and to create emotion. He used everything within that palette. There are moments that we are flying with Snoopy that will have full orchestra, and there other moments where the jazz combo just lays it out there."

On July 28, 2015, it was announced that Meghan Trainor would write and perform a song for the film, entitled "Better When I'm Dancin'". She also wrote and performed another track, that was featured in the international album release. Trainor said that writing songs for the film was "challenging" as she never wrote songs for a film, and she had to make sure that "all of Fox loved it, as well as the director of the movie." Rapper Flo Rida's "That's What I Like" from his EP My House is also featured on the album.

== Additional music ==
The Japanese version titled I Love Snoopy: The Peanuts Movie also uses Japanese singer-songwriter Ayaka's "A Song For You" for the trailer and the ending instead of Trainor's, but it was released as a single and did not appear on the Japanese edition of soundtrack album.

== Reception ==
The album received positive critical response. Filmtracks.com wrote " The album will serve for listeners much like Winnie the Pooh did for fans of the Sherman Brothers' original music for that set of characters during its own updated adaptation in 2011". Marcy Donelson of AllMusic called it as "a bright, symphonic original score by Beck befitting the good-natured family film". Peter Hartlaub, writing for San Francisco Chronicle's SFGate, said that "Christophe Beck manages to weave in several Guaraldi beats along with a few modern songs in the musical score — and makes it all sound like classic Charlie Brown." The Times of India's Reagan Gavin Rasquinha said "Christophe Beck's soundtrack also helps in keeping the pace jaunty, even during parts without dialogue, of which there are quite a few". Writing for SCAD, Emilie Kefalas called that the score "satisfies with a balanced blend of gentle instrumentals and appetizing Vince Guaraldi compositions featuring jazz pianist David Benoit".

Christophe Beck won Best Original Score in an Animated Film at the 2015 Hollywood Music in Media Awards, whereas the song "Better When I'm Dancin'" received a nomination for Best Original Song in an Animated Film. The song was also received nominations at the Guild of Music Supervisors Awards for Best Song Written and/or Recorded Created for a Film, World Soundtrack Awards for Best Original Song Written Directly for a Film, and Radio Disney Music Awards for Best Song That Makes You Smile.

== Track listing ==
All tracks written by Christophe Beck, except where noted.

Standard edition
No.	Title	Writer(s)	Artist(s)	Length
1.	"Linus and Lucy"	Vince Guaraldi	Vince Guaraldi Trio	3:04
2.	"Better When I'm Dancin'"	Meghan Trainor; Thaddeus Dixon	Meghan Trainor	2:56
3.	"That's What I Like"	Jamie Sanderson; Breyan Isaac; Miles Beard; Vincent Venditto; Teemi Brunila; Tramar Dillard; Thomas Troelsen; Jimmy Marinos; Mike Skill; Wally Palamarchuck; Frederick Hibbert	Flo Rida; Fitz	3:15
4.	"Skating"	Vince Guaraldi	Vince Guaraldi Trio	2:23
5.	"Christmas Time Is Here"	Vince Guaraldi; Lee Mendelson	Vince Guaraldi Trio	2:45
6.	"Snow Day"		Beck	2:26
7.	"Fifi's Theme"		Beck	1:13
8.	"Charlie Brown in Love"		Beck	1:38
9.	"Wingwalking"		Beck	2:18
10.	"The Library"		Beck	1:10
11.	"The Assembly"		Beck	2:20
12.	"Curse You Red Baron"		Beck	3:30
13.	"Winter Becomes Spring"		Beck	2:01
14.	"Never Give Up"		Beck	3:50
15.	"Carnival Panic/Linus and Lucy"	Christophe Beck; Vince Guaraldi	Beck	2:17
16.	"Pen Pal Partners"		Beck	1:23
17.	"Good Ol' Charlie Brown" (contains an interpolation of "Linus and Lucy")	Christophe Beck; Vince Guaraldi	Beck	1:03
18.	"Skating"	Vince Guaraldi	Beck	2:39
19.	"Christmas Time is Here/Christmas Is Coming" (Medley)	Vince Guaraldi	Beck	2:53
20.	"Linus and Lucy" (contains an interpolation of "Skating")	Vince Guaraldi	Beck	2:14
21.	"I Won't Let You Down" (Medley)	OK GO		5:21
Total length:				50:00

Target and International bonus track
No.	Title	Writer(s)	Artist(s)	Length
1.	"Linus and Lucy"	Guaraldi	Vince Guaraldi Trio	3:04
2.	"Better When I'm Dancin'"	M. Trainor; Dixon	M. Trainor	2:56
3.	"Good to Be Alive"	M. Trainor; Ryan Trainor	M. Trainor	3:47
4.	"That's What I Like"	Sanderson; Isaac; Beard; Venditto; Brunila; Dillard; Troelsen; Marinos; Skill; Palamarchuck; Hibbert	Flo Rida; Fitz	3:15
5.	"Skating"	Guaraldi	Guaraldi Trio	2:23
6.	"Christmas Time Is Here"	Guaraldi; Mendelson	Guaraldi Trio	2:45
7.	"Snow Day"	Beck	Beck	2:26
8.	"Fifi's Theme"	Beck	Beck	1:13
9.	"Charlie Brown in Love"	Beck	Beck	1:38
10.	"Wingwalking"	Beck	Beck	2:18
11.	"The Library"	Beck	Beck	1:10
12.	"The Assembly"	Beck	Beck	2:20
13.	"Curse You Red Baron"	Beck	Beck	3:30
14.	"Winter Becomes Spring"	Beck	Beck	2:01
15.	"Never Give Up"	Beck	Beck	3:50
16.	"Carnival Panic/Linus and Lucy"	Beck; Guaraldi	Beck	2:17
17.	"Pen Pal Partners"	Beck	Beck	1:23
18.	"Good Ol' Charlie Brown"	Beck; Guaraldi	Beck	1:03
19.	"Skating"	Guaraldi	Beck	2:39
20.	"Christmas Time is Here/Christmas Is Coming" (Medley)	Guaraldi	Beck	2:53
21.	"Linus and Lucy"	Guaraldi	Beck	2:14
Total length:				50:25

Japanese bonus tracks
No.	Title	Writer(s)	Artist(s)	Length
1.	"Linus and Lucy"	Guaraldi	Vince Guaraldi Trio	3:04
2.	"Better When I'm Dancin'"	M. Trainor; Dixon	M. Trainor	2:56
3.	"Good to Be Alive"	M. Trainor; Ryan Trainor	M. Trainor	3:47
4.	"That's What I Like"	Sanderson; Isaac; Beard; Venditto; Brunila; Dillard; Troelsen; Marinos; Skill; Palamarchuck; Hibbert	Flo Rida; Fitz	3:15
5.	"Skating"	Guaraldi	Guaraldi Trio	2:23
6.	"Christmas Time Is Here"	Guaraldi; Mendelson	Guaraldi Trio	2:45
7.	"Snow Day"	Beck	Beck	2:26
8.	"Fifi's Theme"	Beck	Beck	1:13
9.	"Charlie Brown in Love"	Beck	Beck	1:38
10.	"Wingwalking"	Beck	Beck	2:18
11.	"The Library"	Beck	Beck	1:10
12.	"The Assembly"	Beck	Beck	2:20
13.	"Curse You Red Baron"	Beck	Beck	3:30
14.	"Winter Becomes Spring"	Beck	Beck	2:01
15.	"Never Give Up"	Beck	Beck	3:50
16.	"Carnival Panic/Linus and Lucy"	Beck; Guaraldi	Beck	2:17
17.	"Pen Pal Partners"	Beck	Beck	1:23
18.	"Good Ol' Charlie Brown"	Beck; Guaraldi	Beck	1:03
19.	"Skating"	Guaraldi	Beck	2:39
20.	"Christmas Time is Here/Christmas Is Coming" (Medley)	Guaraldi	Beck	2:53
21.	"Linus and Lucy"	Guaraldi	Beck	2:14
22.	"Snooping"	Beck	Beck	1:23
23.	"Wish Upon a Star"	Beck	Beck	1:08
24.	"Return to the Aerodrome"	Beck	Beck	1:03
Total length:				53:59

== Personnel ==
Credits adapted from CD liner notes

Production and technical

- All music composed, arranged, produced by – Christophe Beck
- Original compositions – Vince Guaraldi
- Additional music – Leo Birenberg, Zach Robinson
- Recording – Tim Lauber, Casey Stone, Larry Mah
- Mixing – Casey Stone, Manny Marroquin
- Mastering – David Kutch
- Music supervisor – John Houlihan
- Music editor – Fernand Bos
- Music preparation – Mark Graham
- Score coordinator – Lisa Joseph
- Soundtrack coordinator – Joann Orgel

Instruments

- Bass – Christian Kollgaard, David Parmeter, Drew Dembowski, Edward Meares, Geoffrey Osika, Kevin Axt, Michael Valerio, Nicolas Philippon, Stephen Dress
- Bassoon – Kenneth Munday, Rose Corrigan
- Cello – Armen Ksajikian, Cameron Stone, Dennis Karmazyn, Eric Byers, George Kim Scholes, Giovanna Clayton, Jacob Braun, Paula Hochhalter, Steve Erdody, Vanessa Freebairn-Smith
- Clarinet – Ralph Williams, Stuart Clark
- Flute – Geraldine Rotella, Stephen Kujala*
- Guitar – Andrew Synowiec, Tom Rizzo
- Harp – JoAnn Turovsky
- Horn – Amy Rhine, Benjamin Jaber, Daniel Kelley, David Everson, Jenny Kim, Mark Adams, Steven Becknell, Teag Reaves
- Oboe – Chris Bleth, Leslie Reed
- Percussion – Alan Estes, Brian Kilgore, Edward Atkatz, Gregory Goodall, John Wakefield, Joseph Pereira, Kenneth Mc Grath, Kevin Ricard, Michael Shapiro, Wade Culbreath
- Piano – David Benoit, Randy Kerber
- Trombone – Alexander Iles, Andrew Martin, William Reichenbach, Steven Holtman, Troy Andrews, William Booth
- Trumpet – Barry Perkins, Daniel Fornero, David Washburn, Jon Lewis, Wayne Bergeron
- Tuba – Doug Tornquist
- Viola – Alma Fernandez, Andrew Duckles, Brian Dembow, Darrin McCann, David Walther, Kathryn Reddish, Luke Maurer, Matthew Funes, Michael Nowak, Robert Brophy, Shawn Mann, Thomas Diener, Victoria Miskolczy, Victor De Almeida
- Violin – Alyssa Park, Amy Hershberger, Bruce Dukov, Caroline Campbell, Charlie Bisharat, Darius Campo, Endre Granat, Eun-Mee Ahn, Helen Nightengale, Irina Voloshina, Jacqueline Brand, Jay Rosen, Jessica Guideri, Joel Pargman, Josefina Vergara, Julie Ann Gigante, Katia Popov, Kevin Connolly, Lisa Liu, Lisa Sutton, Lorenz Gamma, Marc Sazer, Marisa Kuney, Natalie Leggett, Neil Samples, Radu Pieptea, Rafael Rishik, Roberto Cani, Roger Wilkie, Sandra Cameron, Serena Mc Kinney, Shalini Vijayan, Songa Lee, Sophie Rose Beck, Tamara Hatwan, Tereza Stanislav, Tiffany Hu

Orchestra

- Orchestrator and conductor – Tim Davies
- Additional orchestration – Jeremy Levy, Kevin Kliesch, Larry Groupé
- Contractor – Peter Rotter
- Concertmaster – Roger Wilkie
- Stage engineer – Denis St. Amand
- Stage manager – Damon Tedesco, Tom Steel

Management

- Art direction and design – Anita Marisa Boriboon
- Executive music producer – Danielle Diego
- Music production supervisor – Rebecca Morellato
- Executive in charge of music – Alexandra Robertson

== Chart performance ==
Chart performance for The Peanuts Movie (Original Motion Picture Soundtrack)
Chart (2015)	Peak position
US Billboard 200	112
US Soundtrack Albums (Billboard)	19

== Release history ==
Release history and formats for The Peanuts Movie (Original Motion Picture Soundtrack)
Region	Date	Format(s)	Label	Catalog code	Ref.
Various	October 23, 2015	digital download; streaming	Epic; Fox Music		
United States	October 23, 2015	CD (Target exclusive)	Epic; Fox Music	88875146382	
United States	October 30, 2015	CD	Epic; Fox Music	88875146382	
United States	December 11, 2015	Vinyl	Epic; Fox Music	88875146371	
United Kingdom	October 30, 2015	CD	Epic; Fox Music	88875146382	
Japan (Note: released as I Love Snoopy: The Peanuts Movie)	November 25, 2015	CD	Epic	SICP 4538	
