= The Place Where Lost Things Go =

2018 soundtrack by Emily Blunt

Song by Emily Blunt / Pixie Davies / Nathanael Saleh / Joel Dawson

from the album Mary Poppins Returns: Original Motion Picture Soundtrack
- Released: November 26, 2018
- Recorded: 2017
- Genre: Soundtrack
- Length: 3:43
- Label: Walt Disney
- Composer: Marc Shaiman
- Lyricists: Marc Shaiman; Scott Wittman

"The Place Where Lost Things Go" is a song from the 2018 film Mary Poppins Returns which was written by Marc Shaiman and Scott Wittman. The song was performed by Emily Blunt as the titular character, while a reprise of the song was performed by Blunt's co-stars Pixie Davies, Nathanael Saleh, and Joel Dawson.

== Context and history ==
The song acts as "the film's central ballad". It is a lullaby in which Mary Poppins (Blunt) tells to the children Annabel (Davies), John (Saleh), and Georgie Banks (Dawson), whose mother died before the events of the film, about "the place where lost things go", and that their mother is there watching over them. Blunt felt that the song's message that "nothing’s gone forever, only out of place" is "so important for the world we’re in right now, with a lot of kids feeling a lot of loss".

Shaiman said that the song's idea of "a place where the lost things go" was something that "stuck in [his and Wittman's] heads" when planning the song. Unlike most songs in the film, the song wasn't re-written by Shaiman and Wittman, as they felt it was "a sure-fire hit from the start". Shaiman and Wittman were inspired for the song's central idea by P. L. Travers' novels that inspired both the film and its predecessor, in which Mary Poppins takes Jane and Michael Banks (who in the film are Annabel, John, and Georgie's father and aunt, respectively) to the Moon, where they meet the Man in the Moon, who tells them that, in the dark side of the Moon, are the things that get lost.

== Release ==
"The Place Where Lost Things Go" was released, along with the rest of the film's soundtrack, on December 7, 2018. On November 26, 2018, a clip from the film featuring Blunt's version of the song was released on Disney's YouTube channel.

== Other versions ==
Shaiman performed the song during an event hosted by SiriusXM. During the 91st Academy Awards, Bette Midler performed the song, with Shaiman performing the song's music on piano.

== Accolades ==
Award	Date of ceremony	Category	Result	Ref(s)
Academy Awards	February 24, 2019	Best Original Song	Nominated	

== Certifications ==
Region	Certification	Certified units/sales
United States (RIAA)	Gold	500,000^{‡}
^{‡} Sales+streaming figures based on certification alone.
