= Thaddeus Dixon =

American songwriter and record producer

- Also known as: The Music Man
- Born: Thaddeus Gustav Dixon; January 14, 1984 (age 42); Detroit, Michigan, United States
- Genres: Pop; R&B; hip hop; jazz; gospel
- Occupations: Record producer; songwriter; musician; music director
- Instruments: Drums; bass; keyboard
- Years active: 2006–present
- Website: thaddeus-dixon.com

Thaddeus Gustav Dixon (born January 14, 1984), also known as The Music Man, is an American record producer, songwriter, and music director. He co-produced and co-wrote Meghan Trainor's 2015 single "Better When I'm Dancin'," which she performed for The Peanuts Movie soundtrack. The song received platinum certification by the Recording Industry Association of America (RIAA).

Dixon has also worked as a music director and drummer for Bryson Tiller, Khalid and other artists. He's been featured on series including Making the Band and Late Night with Seth Meyers.

== Early life and education ==
Dixon was born in Detroit, Michigan, the only child of Gus and Denise Dixon. He began playing drums at 4 years old, practicing the instrument as he attended church. He went to Detroit High School for Fine & Performing Arts and played at local concerts for gospel artists including Kirk Franklin.

After graduating high school, Dixon moved to East Lansing, Michigan to attend Michigan State University (MSU) on a jazz studies scholarship. He performed at professional concerts while pursuing his degree, and graduated in 2006 with a Bachelor of Music.

== Career ==
Dixon began his professional career as a touring drummer with The Spinners. Thereafter, he performed with artists including Ne-Yo, Sean Kingston, Mulgrew Miller, Roy Hargrove and Steve Nelson. He later appeared on MTV's "Making His Band", a reality TV show where musicians competed for positions in Sean Combs' touring band. He was a drum finalist, however another musician was ultimately selected. Dixon then worked with acts including Deitrick Haddon, Bone Thugs-n-Harmony, Dawn Richard and Timothy Bloom. He also performed with his own jazz ensemble, The Thaddeus Dixon Quartet. He then relocated to Berkeley to work as an instructor in the music department at the University of California, Berkeley for two years.

Dixon later became the music director for recording artist Cody Simpson. He then managed music direction for Meghan Trainor, Bryson Tiller, Khalid and Brent Faiyaz. He also produced music for Meghan Trainor, Talib Kweli, Raekwon, Timothy Bloom, Deborah Cox, Teedra Moses and Rick Ross among others. In October 2018, he released his debut single, "Letter To My X's" featuring KR.

== Production credits ==
=== 2011 ===
Deitrick Haddon - Church on the Moon

- (Drums)

21:03 - Evolved...from Boys to Men

- (Drums)

Disney Jazz, Vol. 1: Everybody Wants to Be a Cat

- (Drums)

Robert McCarther - Stranger in Town

- (Drums)

Rick Roe - Minor Shuffle

- (Drums)

=== 2013 ===
Talib Kweli - Gravitas

- "Violations" feat. Raekwon (Producer)

=== 2014 ===
Timothy Bloom - Timothy Bloom

- "Your Future" (Composer, Drums, Producer, Programming)

Teedra Moses - California Vibes

- "Can’t Be Luv" (Producer)

Abrina – My Playground (EP)

- "Blowin" feat. Jeremih (Producer)

=== 2015 ===
The Peanuts Movie Original Soundtrack

- "Better When I'm Dancin'" (Backwards Vocals, Producer, Text)

Deborah Cox - Work of Art

- "More Than I Knew" (Producer)

Teedra Moses - Cognac & Conversation

- "All I Ever Wanted" feat. Rick Ross (Composer, Engineer, Producer)
- "Cognac & Conversation" feat. Rick Ross (Composer, Engineer, Producer)

Coco Jones

- "Let Em Know" (Producer)

=== 2016 ===
Thaddeus Dixon feat. Timothy Bloom and Talib Kweli

- "All About You" (Producer)

Taeyeon – Rain

- "Secret" (Composer, Arrangement)

MÄDA

- "Lights Off" (Producer)
- "Without U Baby" (Producer)

=== 2017 ===
MÄDA - Our Love (EP)

- "I Still Love You" feat. Dreezy (Producer)

=== 2018 ===
Thaddeus Dixon feat. KR

- "Letter To My X's" (Primary Artist, Composer, Engineer, Producer)

=== 2020 ===
T.I. feat. Benny The Butcher & Jadakiss

- "Make Amends" (Producer)
