= Cognac & Conversation =

Studio album by Teedra Moses
- Released: August 7, 2015
- Recorded: 2012–2015
- Genre: R&B
- Length: 47:18
- Label: Shanachie
- Producer: Bink!; Boddhi Satva; Donnie Cash; Dwayne "DW" Wright; Locksmiff; Teedra Moses; Trackademicks; Thaddeus Dixon; Uncle Chucc

Teedra Moses chronology
Complex Simplicity (2004)	Cognac & Conversation (2015)

Singles from Cognac & Conversation
- 1. "Get It Right" Released: May 8, 2015; 2. "All I Ever Wanted" Released: September 18, 2015

Professional ratings
Review scores
Source	Rating
AllMusic	4/5 stars
Exclaim!	7/10

Cognac & Conversation is the second studio album by American singer Teedra Moses. It was released on August 7, 2015, via Shanachie Records. Production was handled by Bink!, Donnie Cash, Thaddeus Dixon, Boddhi Satva, Dwayne "DW" Wright, Locksmiff, Trackademicks, Uncle Chucc, and Teedra Moses herself. It features guest appearances from Rick Ross, 3D Na'Tee and Anthony Hamilton.

This is her first album in 11 years since her debut album Complex Simplicity.

== Track listing ==
No.	Title	Writer(s)	Producer(s)	Length
1.	"R U Scared"	Teedra Moses; Charles Hamilton; Jeret Griffin-Black	Uncle Chucc; Nate Scott (voc.)	3:22
2.	"All I Ever Wanted" (featuring Rick Ross)	Moses; William Roberts II; Thaddeus Dixon	Thaddeus Dixon; Nate Scott (voc.)	3:42
3.	"International Playboi"	Moses; Jason Valerio	Trackademicks; Nate Scott (voc.)	4:50
4.	"Biscayne Blvd (Interlude)"	Moses	Teedra Moses	0:28
5.	"Get It Right"	Moses; Nate Stallworth	Locksmiff; Nate Scott (voc.)	3:24
6.	"Cognac & Conversation" (featuring Rick Ross)	Moses; Roberts II; Dixon	Thaddeus Dixon; Brian Stanley (add.); Nate Scott (voc.)	3:38
7.	"Only U" (featuring 3D Na'Tee)	Moses; Donald Whittemore	Donnie Cash; Nate Scott (voc.)	4:42
8.	"Sketches of Heartbreak (Interlude)"	Moses	Teedra Moses; Nate Scott (voc.)	0:42
9.	"Beautiful Chaos"	Moses	Donnie Cash; Nate Scott (voc.)	3:31
10.	"Skin Diver"	Moses; Armani Kombot-Naguemon	Boddhi Satva; Nate Scott (voc.)	3:47
11.	"That One" (featuring Anthony Hamilton)	Moses; Anthony Hamilton; Roosevelt Harrell III	Bink!; Nate Scott (voc.)	4:17
12.	"Sound Off (Interlude)"	Moses	Teedra Moses; Nate Scott (voc.)	1:54
13.	"Yesterday Ain't Tomorrow"	Moses; Harrell III	Bink!; Nate Scott (voc.)	4:08
14.	"Wish You Were Here (Interlude)"	Moses	Teedra Moses; Nate Scott (voc.)	1:25
15.	"No Regrets"	Moses; Dwayne Wright	DW; Nate Scott (voc.)	3:28
Total length:				47:18

== Personnel ==
- Teedra Shenita Moses — vocals, producer (tracks: 4, 8, 12, 14), arranger, engineering (tracks: 3, 10, 12, 14, 15), executive producer
- William "Rick Ross" Roberts II — vocals (tracks: 2, 6)
- Samantha Davon "3D Na'Tee" James — vocals (track 7)
- Anthony Hamilton — vocals (track 11)
- Chris Soper — guitar (track 6)
- LeShawn Thomas — bass (track 12)
- Dave Chiverton — drums (track 12)
- Darion Bean — keyboards (track 15)
- Jeremy Most — guitar (track 15)
- Dwayne "DW" Wright — bass & producer (track 15)
- Charles "Uncle Chucc" Hamilton — producer (track 1)
- Thaddeus Dixon — producer (tracks: 2, 6), engineering (track 6)
- Jason "Trackademicks" Valerio — producer (track 3)
- Nate "Locksmiff" Stallworth — producer & engineering (track 5)
- Donald "Donnie Cash" Whittemore — producer (tracks: 7, 9), engineering (tracks: 2, 7–9, 13), mixing (track 7)
- Armani "Boddhi Satva" Kombot-Naguemon — producer (track 10)
- Roosevelt "Bink!" Harrell III — producer (tracks: 11, 13)
- Brian Stanley — additional producer & mixing (track 6)
- Nate Scott — vocal producer (tracks: 1–3, 5–15), mixing (tracks: 1, 2, 8, 10, 12, 14, 15), engineering (track 11), executive producer
- Garnett "G" Flynn — engineering (track 1)
- John D. Norten — mixing (tracks: 3, 5, 9)
- Pat Viala — mixing (tracks: 11, 13)
- Emmanuel Brilliant — engineering (track 12)
- Chris Gehringer — mastering
- Tamia Schannell — executive producer

== Charts ==
Chart (2016)	Peak position
US Top R&B/Hip-Hop Albums (Billboard)	20
US Independent Albums (Billboard)	16
