= Complex Simplicity =

Studio album by Teedra Moses
- Released: August 10, 2004; September 27, 2019 (re-released)
- Recorded: 2003–2004
- Studio: Blakeslee, North Hollywood, California; Enterprise, Burbank, California; Poli's Crib; Quad, New York City, New York; Stampede Origin, Culver City, California
- Genre: R&B
- Length: 62:03
- Label: TVT
- Producer: Paul Poli; Raphael Saadiq; Jonathan Smith

Teedra Moses chronology
Complex Simplicity (2004)	Cognac & Conversation (2015)

Singles from Complex Simplicity
- 1. "You'll Never Find (A Better Woman)" Released: November 11, 2003; 2. "Be Your Girl" Released: June 1, 2004; 3. "You Better Tell Her" Released: December 27, 2005

Complex Simplicity is the debut studio album by American singer Teedra Moses. It was released on August 10, 2004, by TVT Records. The album was produced largely by Paul Poli, with additional production from Raphael Saadiq and Lil Jon.

== Singles ==
The album's lead single, "You'll Never Find (A Better Woman)", was released as a 12-inch vinyl in the United States on November 11, 2003. It was serviced to US rhythmic contemporary radio a week later, on November 18, 2003. The track, which features rapper Jadakiss, peaked at number 86 on Billboard's Hot R&B/Hip-Hop Songs chart.

The second single, "Be Your Girl", was released as a 12-inch vinyl in the US on June 1, 2004, and impacted rhythmic and urban contemporary radio on the same day. It was also released as a CD single in Germany on February 21, 2005. The single reached number 87 on the Hot R&B/Hip-Hop Songs chart. The accompanying music video was directed by Hype Williams.

The third and final single, "You Better Tell Her", was released as a 12-inch vinyl on December 27, 2005. The single version features rappers Pitbull and Lil' Scrappy.

== Critical reception ==
Professional ratings
Review scores
Source	Rating
AllMusic	5/5 stars
Pitchfork	8.0/10
Rolling Stone	3.5/5 stars

AllMusic's Andy Kellman lauded Complex Simplicity as "the best R&B album of 2004—if not the best pop-oriented R&B album since CrazySexyCool." Matt Cibula of PopMatters described the album as "awe-inspiring and cool and touching and kind of avant-garde in a weird homegrown way". Jon Caramanica of Rolling Stone wrote that Moses has "a cheery, twee voice, and on her debut she uses it to sass the men in her life." Patrick Taliaferro of Vibe viewed the album as "a great entry into the R&B game", adding that "Moses is appealing when revealing her country B-girl bravado, but at the end it's actually all we see, variations in her approach would have been nice." The album earned Moses comparisons to R&B artists such as Mary J. Blige, Deniece Williams, and Cherrelle.

== Track listing ==
All tracks produced by Paul Poli, except where noted.

Complex Simplicity track listing
No.	Title	Writer(s)	Length
1.	"Be Your Girl"	Teedra Moses; Poli; Nasir Jones; Raul Santiago; Christopher Jones	4:09
2.	"You'll Never Find (A Better Woman)" (featuring Jadakiss)	Moses; Poli; Vee Allen; Al Hudson; Jack Hall	4:13
3.	"Caution"	Moses; Poli	4:37
4.	"Backstroke"	Moses; Poli	3:37
5.	"No More Tears"	Moses; Poli; Mac Robinson; André Benjamin; Patrick Brown; Antwan Patton	4:11
6.	"Rescue Me"	Moses; Poli	4:06
7.	"Take Me" (featuring Raphael Saadiq) (producer: Saadiq)	Moses; Saadiq	4:44
8.	"You Better Tell Her" (producer: Jonathan Smith)	Moses; Smith	6:15
9.	"Outta My Head"	Moses; Poli; Teddy Randazzo; Bobby Weinstein	3:39
10.	"Complex Simplicity"	Moses; Poli	4:16
11.	"For a Lifetime"	Moses; Poli	4:15
12.	"Caught Up"	Moses; Poli; Robinson	4:14
13.	"Last Day"	Moses; Poli	3:41
14.	"I Think of You (Shirley's Song)"	Moses; Poli; Robinson	6:06
Total length:			62:03

UK edition
No.	Title	Writer(s)	Length
10.	"Doin' You"	Moses; Poli	3:58
11.	"Complex Simplicity"	Moses; Poli	4:16
12.	"For a Lifetime"	Moses; Poli	4:15
13.	"Caught Up"	Moses; Poli; Robinson	4:14
14.	"Last Day"	Moses; Poli	3:41
15.	"I Think of You (Shirley's Song)"	Moses; Poli; Robinson	6:06
16.	"Still Your Girl" (featuring Raphael Saadiq, Truth Hurts and Scipio)		4:15
Total length:			91:16

15th anniversary edition
No.	Title	Writer(s)	Length
15.	"Doin' You"	Moses; Poli	3:58
16.	"You Better Tell Her (TVT Mix)"	Moses; Poli	3:44
17.	"Cabernet Sauvignon"	Moses	3:24
18.	"I Think of You (3 Generations)" (featuring Shirley Moses, Raj and Taj Austin)	Moses; Poli; Robinson	6:43
Total length:			77:04

Sample credits

- "Be Your Girl" contains replayed elements of "One on One", as performed by Nas
- "You'll Never Find (A Better Woman)" contains a sample of "Better Woman or Bigger Fool", as performed by Alicia Myers
- "No More Tears" contains replayed elements of "SpottieOttieDopaliscious", as performed by OutKast
- "Outta My Head" contains an interpolation of "Goin' Out of My Head", as performed by Little Anthony and the Imperials

== Personnel ==
Credits adapted from the liner notes of Complex Simplicity.

- Teedra Moses – vocals, vocal arrangement (all tracks); executive production
- Rich Balmer – engineering (track 14)
- Gerry Brown – recording (track 7)
- Gerald Clayton – keyboards (tracks 1–3, 5, 6, 10–13)
- Kevin Davis – mixing (track 4)
- Clare Fischer – string arrangements (track 7)
- Ryan Freeland – mixing (tracks 1, 3, 5, 6, 9–14); engineering (tracks 9, 14)
- John Frye – mixing (track 8)
- Tony Gillis – mastering
- Mark Gray – recording assistance (track 8)
- Jadakiss – vocals (track 2)
- Bryan Leach – co-executive production
- Anthony Mandler – photography
- Charles "Chaz" Muhammad – organ (track 14)
- Paul Poli – production, vocal arrangement (tracks 1–6, 9–14); engineering (tracks 1–3, 4–6, 10–13); keyboards (tracks 1–3, 5, 6, 10–13); executive production
- Mac Robinson – guitar (tracks 1, 3, 5, 6, 9, 12, 14); bass, keyboards, percussion (tracks 9, 14)
- Danny Romero – recording (track 7); mixing (tracks 7, 14)
- Raphael Saadiq – bass, guitar, production, vocal arrangement, vocals (track 7)
- Greg Smith – recording (track 8)
- Jonathan Smith – production (track 8)
- Shaffer Smith – vocal arrangement (tracks 1–3, 5, 6, 8–11, 13, 14)
- Benjamin Wheelock – design
- Dubbs Willie – executive production
- Kelvin Wooten – drums, guitar, keyboards (track 7)

== Charts ==
Chart performance for Complex Simplicity
Chart (2004)	Peak position
US Billboard 200	168
US Independent Albums (Billboard)	11
US Top R&B/Hip-Hop Albums (Billboard)	20

== Release history ==
Release history and formats for Complex Simplicity
Region	Date	Label	Ref.
United States	August 10, 2004	TVT	
Australia	October 8, 2004	TVT	
Germany	November 29, 2004	TVT	
Japan	February 2, 2005	Victor	
United Kingdom	June 20, 2005	TVT	
