= Gravitas (Talib Kweli album) =

Studio album by Talib Kweli
- Released: December 15, 2013
- Recorded: 2013
- Genre: Hip-hop
- Length: 43:57
- Label: Javotti Media
- Producer: 6th Sense; Brady Watt; Decap; J Dilla; Khrysis; Lord Quest; Oh No; Rich Kidd; Statik Selektah; Thaddeus Dixon

Talib Kweli chronology
| Prisoner of Conscious (2013) | Gravitas (2013) | Fuck the Money (2015) |

Gravitas is the sixth solo studio album by American rapper Talib Kweli. The album was released on December 15, 2013, by Javotti Media. The album was released exclusively through Talib Kweli's website. The album features guest appearances from Gary Clark Jr., Abby Dobson, Big K.R.I.T., Raekwon, the Underachievers, Black Thought, Rah Digga, and Mike Posner. The album was produced by Oh No, Khrysis, Statik Selektah, Rich Kidd, J Dilla, and others.

== Background ==
In August 2013, during an interview with XXL, Talib Kweli announced that he would release his next studio album in 2014 which would contain production from Q-Tip, saying: "Q-Tip—I’m working with Q-Tip on my new album. Just being around him and seeing him work, I’ve now watched him get giddy over samples and play me beats and stuff. And it’s like, wow, is this how he made Midnight Marauders?" In the same interview he also announced that his sixth studio album would be titled Gravitas, saying: "The new album [is] called Gravitas, but I’ve just started on it so there’s not that many details yet."

On October 5, 2013, Talib Kweli announced the album's release date in a press release, saying: "When you pre order my newest project, Gravitas, available Dec 15th, you will be buying it directly from me, no middleman, and I will now have a direct relationship with you. Who needs this industry when we have each other. The technology exists for me to have this relationship with the fans, and vice versa. It is a grand experiment. Lets go for it! Gravitas is my sixth solo album. It will feature production from OhNo, Q-Tip, Lord Quest, Rich Kidd and more." He described the album, saying: "One of my favorite things about today's hip-hop is the honesty. Today's most popular rappers aren't always politically correct or deep, but the best are unflinchingly honest. While my story may be documented, I have never truly told my story thru music. My true fans have heard bits and pieces thru the years, but Gravitas sums up my experience until now." The album was released in MP3 form on December 15, 2013, while a physical version was released on February 18, 2014, through Fat Beats Records.

In a December 2013 interview with Complex, Talib Kweli spoke about why he decided to name the album Gravitas, saying: "Prisoner of Conscious was about music more than lyrics. I feel that people can be dismissive of me as a musician when they focus so much on my lyrics. Don't get me wrong, I am proud to be considered a great lyricist, but if it wasn't for my musical choices no one would hear me or care. So I tried new things musically on POC and worked with many guests. On Gravitas, my focus is on telling my story lyrically. The word gravitas is used to describe someone whose words and actions have importance and weight. I felt it was time to introduce some gravitas into hip-hop."

In the same interview, he also spoke about why he decided to distribute the album himself, saying:

"Although I am known as a leader in the indie movement, I have been distributed by majors for most of my career, even while I was on Rawkus. The first truly indie album I did was Gutter Rainbows on Javotti/3D. Gravitas takes it up a notch. I am following the lead of Ryan Leslie who provided the www.kweliclub.com platform for me. He's a genius for it. The advantages are: I will get the fans' emails. Everyone who sells music online gets consumer emails but the actual artist, it's not fair. Now I can communicate with actual fans who actually buy. I can look at my database and see who's buying what and where, and the money will come directly to me as opposed to a third party. Honestly, I don't know if people mean it when they say they want to support artists directly. I will know after this, I've left you no excuse. Another disadvantage is: people are used to getting music where they are used to getting music. It will take a sec to get them to understand Gravitas is ONLY available at www.kweliclub.com."

He also spoke about why the songs with Q-Tip didn't make the album, saying: "Q-Tip is not on Gravitas. We've done a couple of songs together. But I've been on tour with Macklemore Ryan Lewis and Big KRIT and I really want to get back in with Tip live-in-the-flesh to finish these songs. They weren't ready for Gravitas."

In a December 2013, interview with HipHopDX, Talib Kweli spoke about how the album is different from other album's he's released, saying: "The first thing that they can expect from Grativas is to have a direct relationship with me. Gravitas is direct to fans. It's only available at kweliclub.com. I want your e-mail. You can expect that I'll have your e-mail and I'll be e-mailing you things. When you buy with all these different corporations, they have your e-mail [addresses], but the artist never gets it. [With] Prisoner of Conscious, the focus was definitely to show people, musically, you like my music because I make great music. The focus of Gravitas is definitely lyrics and me telling my story. Prisoner of Conscious was like, 'I'm making songs.' I'm like, 'Okay, I'm making this song. Let's see what this song is about. Here's a song with Miguel…' I'm proud of Prisoner of Conscious. I worked on it for four years. It was the album I wanted to make. But immediately after I finished making it, I felt the need to start writing. ...This is for fans of mine who already know that I'm dope musically. They just want to hear dope lyrics. So this album is for them."

== Critical reception ==
Professional ratings
Aggregate scores
| Source | Rating |
|---|---|
| Metacritic | 73/100 |
Review scores
| Source | Rating |
| AllMusic | 4/5 stars |
| The A.V. Club | B− |
| Exclaim! | 6/10 |
| HipHopDX | 4/5 stars |
| PopMatters | 6/10 |
| XXL | 4/5 (XL) |

Gravitas was met with generally positive reviews by music critics. At Metacritic, which assigns a normalized rating out of 100 to reviews from critics, the album received an average score of 73, based on 6 reviews, indicating "generally favorable reviews". Dan Rys of XXL gave the album an XL, saying "On Gravitas, he avoids preachiness by couching his messages inside storylines where they can be more easily digested, a practice most obvious on some of the album’s best songs (“State of Grace,” “Demonology”) while mixing in a healthy dose of straight facts (“The Wormhole” and “Rare Portraits”) to support his narratives. He may still be too lyrical for some, but for many his Gravitas will be a welcome change from hip-hop’s current norm." David Jeffries of AllMusic gave the album four out of five stars, saying "A maverick if ever there was one, rapper Talib Kweli is quite happy to stroll from the mainstream to the underground while refusing to carry any of the baggage those two camps might throw at him. His 2013 album, Prisoner of Conscious, featured Nelly alongside some "no sell-out" numbers and provided listeners a bit of a rocky ride, but this follow-up feels more natural as it shrugs off preconceptions left and right, flowing effortlessly, even humbly, from its boom-bap opener to its bro-rap closer."

Devone Jones of PopMatters gave the album a six out of ten, saying "It will never reach the dizzying heights of any previous albums, nor will it gain the critical appeal of his debut. However, Gravitas was, at the very least, one of the better albums released in 2013. Many will never regard this album as a hip-hop highlight, but I personally believe it signals a return to form for Kweli. Here’s to hoping he can reach the creative peak of his first album with his next one." Patrick Bowman of The A.V. Club gave the album a B−, saying "In the end, the uneven, occasionally locked-in Gravitas finds Talib Kweli energetically exercising his artistry free of any agenda but his own, and hopefully positioning him for a true return to form next time around." Aaron Matthews of Exclaim! gave the album a six out of ten, saying "If you don't love Kweli, Gravitas won't change your mind, but lifelong fans will definitely find a lot to appreciate on this slight but enjoyable album." Jesse Fairfax of HipHopDX gave the album four out of five stars, saying "Nearing two decades since his earliest professional recordings, time has seen Talib Kweli evolve into an eclectic solo act separate from his past incarnations as half of supergroups Black Star and Reflection Eternal. Thus, Gravitas is a superior showing, whereby he will likely reap the benefits of continual hard work and dedication. The spirit of J. Dilla is kept alive on the album's closer "Colors of You," a mild concession to the rigid-minded audience looking to keep him boxed into a preexistent sound. With this release, Kweli has placed himself in a fortunate position where we can rest assured his next moves will be completely self-determined regardless of critical skepticism."

== Track listing ==
Credits were adapted from the album's liner notes.

| No. | Title | Writer(s) | Producer(s) | Length |
|---|---|---|---|---|
| 1. | "Inner Monologue" | Talib Kweli; Christopher Tyson; Lorenzo Ferguson; K. Ross | Khrysis | 3:47 |
| 2. | "Demonology" (featuring Big K.R.I.T. and Gary Clark Jr.) | T. Kweli; Adrian Younge; Jeffrey "Lord Quest" Nuamah; Justin Scott; Gary Clark Jr. | Lord Quest | 3:55 |
| 3. | "State of Grace" (featuring Abby Dobson) | T. Kweli; J. Nuamah; Abby Dobson | Lord Quest; Brady Watt; Decap | 5:54 |
| 4. | "Violations" (featuring Raekwon) | T. Kweli; Corey Woods; Thaddeus Dixon | Thaddeus Dixon | 3:37 |
| 5. | "Rare Portraits" | T. Kweli; Michael Woodrow Jackson | Oh No; Brady Watt; Decap | 3:50 |
| 6. | "New Leaders" (featuring The Underachievers) | T. Kweli; Akeem Joseph; Marlon Fung; Patrick Baril | Statik Selektah | 5:06 |
| 7. | "The Wormhole" | T. Kweli; M. Woodrow Jackson | Oh No | 4:10 |
| 8. | "What's Real" (featuring RES) | T. Kweli; Richie Acheampong | Rich Kidd | 4:27 |
| 9. | "Art Imitates Life" (featuring Black Thought, Rah Digga, and ALBe. Back) | T. Kweli; M. Woodrow Jackson; Tariq Trotter; Rashia Fisher | Oh No | 3:47 |
| 10. | "Lover's Peak" | T. Kweli; Michael "6th Sense" Kawesch; Iakov Kremenskiy; Denaun Porter | 6th Sense | 1:59 |
| 11. | "Colors of You" (featuring Mike Posner) | T. Kweli; Mike Posner; James Yancey | J Dilla (Instrumental only) | 3:26 |

Sample credits

- "Demonology" contains a sample from "Two Hearts Combine", performed by Adrian Younge and Venice Dawn.
- "Violations" contains a drum sample from "Little Miss Lover", by The Jimi Hendrix Experience.
- "Colors of You" uses a previously unreleased beat produced by J Dilla.

== Release history ==
| Region | Date | Format | Label |
|---|---|---|---|
| United States | December 15, 2013 | Digital download | Javotti Media |
| United States | February 18, 2014 | CD | Javotti Media, Fat Beats Records |
