= Mary Poppins Returns =

2018 musical film by Rob Marshall

- Theatrical release poster
- Directed by: Rob Marshall
- Screenplay by: David Magee
- Story by: David Magee; Rob Marshall; John DeLuca
- Based on: Mary Poppins by P. L. Travers
- Produced by: Rob Marshall; John DeLuca; Marc Platt
- Starring: Emily Blunt; Lin-Manuel Miranda; Ben Whishaw; Emily Mortimer; Julie Walters; Angela Lansbury; Colin Firth; Meryl Streep; Dick Van Dyke
- Cinematography: Dion Beebe
- Edited by: Wyatt Smith
- Music by: Marc Shaiman
- Production companies: Walt Disney Pictures; Pixar Animation Studios; Lucamar Productions; Marc Platt Productions
- Distributed by: Walt Disney Studios; Motion Pictures
- Release dates: November 29, 2018 (Dolby Theatre); December 19, 2018 (United States)
- Running time: 131 minutes
- Country: United States
- Language: English
- Budget: $130 million
- Box office: $362.5 million

Mary Poppins Returns is a 2018 American musical fantasy comedy film directed by Rob Marshall, with a screenplay written by David Magee and a story by Magee, Marshall, and John DeLuca. Loosely based on the book series Mary Poppins by P. L. Travers, the film is a sequel to the 1964 film Mary Poppins, and stars Emily Blunt as Mary Poppins, with supporting roles from Lin-Manuel Miranda, Ben Whishaw, Emily Mortimer, Julie Walters, Dick Van Dyke, Angela Lansbury, Colin Firth, Meryl Streep, and David Warner in his final film appearance. Set in London during the Great Depression, the film sees Mary Poppins, the former nanny of Jane and Michael Banks, return to them in the wake of the death of Michael's wife.

Walt Disney Pictures announced the film in September 2015. Marshall was hired later that month, and Blunt and Miranda were cast in February 2016. Principal photography lasted from February to July 2017, and took place at Shepperton Studios in England. Mary Poppins Returns had its world premiere at the Dolby Theatre in Hollywood on 29 November 2018, and was theatrically released in the United States on 19 December 2018.

The film grossed $362 million worldwide and received positive reviews from critics, who praised the performances of the cast (particularly those of Blunt and Miranda), direction, visuals, musical score, musical numbers, costume design, production values, visual effects (especially the animated segments), and sense of nostalgia, although some critics found it too derivative of its predecessor. It was chosen by both the National Board of Review and American Film Institute as one of the top ten films of 2018 and received numerous award nominations, including four at the 76th Golden Globe Awards (including for Best Motion Picture – Musical or Comedy), nine at the 24th Critics' Choice Awards, three at the 72nd British Academy Film Awards, and a SAG Award nomination for Blunt at the 25th Screen Actors Guild Awards. It also received four Oscar nominations for Best Original Score, Best Original Song ("The Place Where Lost Things Go"), Best Production Design, and Best Costume Design at the 91st Academy Awards.

== Plot ==
During the Great Depression, Michael Banks lives in his London childhood home with his three children, John, Annabel and Georgie, his wife Kate having died a year earlier. Michael has taken a loan from his employer, the Fidelity Fiduciary Bank, and is three months behind on payments. Wilkins, the bank's corrupt new chairman, sends associates to warn him that his house will be repossessed if the loan is not repaid in full by Friday. Michael mourns Kate and expresses concern about raising his children without her ("A Conversation"). Michael and his sister Jane recall that their father left them shares in the bank that should cover the loan, and they search the house for the share certificate. During the search, Michael finds his childhood kite and disposes of it.

The children visit a local park, and Georgie, who has found the kite, flies it. Mary Poppins descends from the sky with the kite in her hand. She takes the children home and announces that she will take charge of them as their nanny. She draws a bath for the three children, leading to underwater adventures ("Can You Imagine That?").

Michael visits the bank seeking proof of his shares, but Wilkins denies that there are any records, later covertly destroying the page from the official ledger. Annabel and John decide to sell their mother's 'priceless' bowl to pay off the debt. Georgie tries to stop them, and the bowl becomes damaged while the three fight over it. Jack, a lamplighter and the apprentice of Mary's original best friend Bert, greets Mary and joins her and the children on a trip into the scene decorating the bowl. During their visit to the Royal Doulton Music Hall ("A Cover is Not the Book"), Georgie is kidnapped by an animated wolf, weasel, and badger who are repossessing their belongings, and Annabel and John set out to rescue him. They do so successfully, fall off the edge of the bowl, and wake in their beds. Realizing they are hurting after the loss of their mother, Mary sings them a lullaby ("The Place Where Lost Things Go").

The children visit Mary Poppins's cousin Topsy, hoping to get the bowl mended ("Turning Turtle") and learn that it has little monetary value. They take Michael's briefcase to him at the bank, where they overhear Wilkins discussing the planned repossession of their house. Believing that he and his associates are the same animal gang who kidnapped him, Georgie interrupts the meeting. Michael is angry with the children for putting the house and his job at risk. Mary Poppins takes the children home, guided by Jack and his fellow lamplighters who teach the children their rhyming slang ("Trip A Little Light Fantastic"). The children comfort a despairing Michael, and the four reconcile.

As midnight on Friday approaches, the Bankses prepare to move out of their house. While examining his old kite, Michael discovers that Georgie had used the missing share certificate to mend it. Jane and Michael rush to the bank while Mary Poppins and the children go with Jack and the lamplighters to Big Ben to 'turn back time'. After scaling the clock tower, they turn the clock back five minutes, giving Jane and Michael just enough time to reach the bank.

Wilkins, however, will not accept the certificate as part of it is still missing. Wilkins's elderly uncle and the bank's previous chairman, Mr. Dawes Jr., arrives and dismisses Wilkins on the spot for his corrupt business practices. He reveals that Michael has plenty of assets to cover the loan, namely the judiciously invested tuppence he had deposited with the bank many years earlier.

The next day, the Bankses visit the park, where a fair is in full swing. They purchase balloons that carry them into the air, where they are joined by Jack and many others ("Nowhere to Go but Up"). On their return home, Mary Poppins announces that it is time for her to leave. Jane and Michael thank her as her umbrella carries her back up into the sky and away.

== Cast ==
=== Live-action cast ===
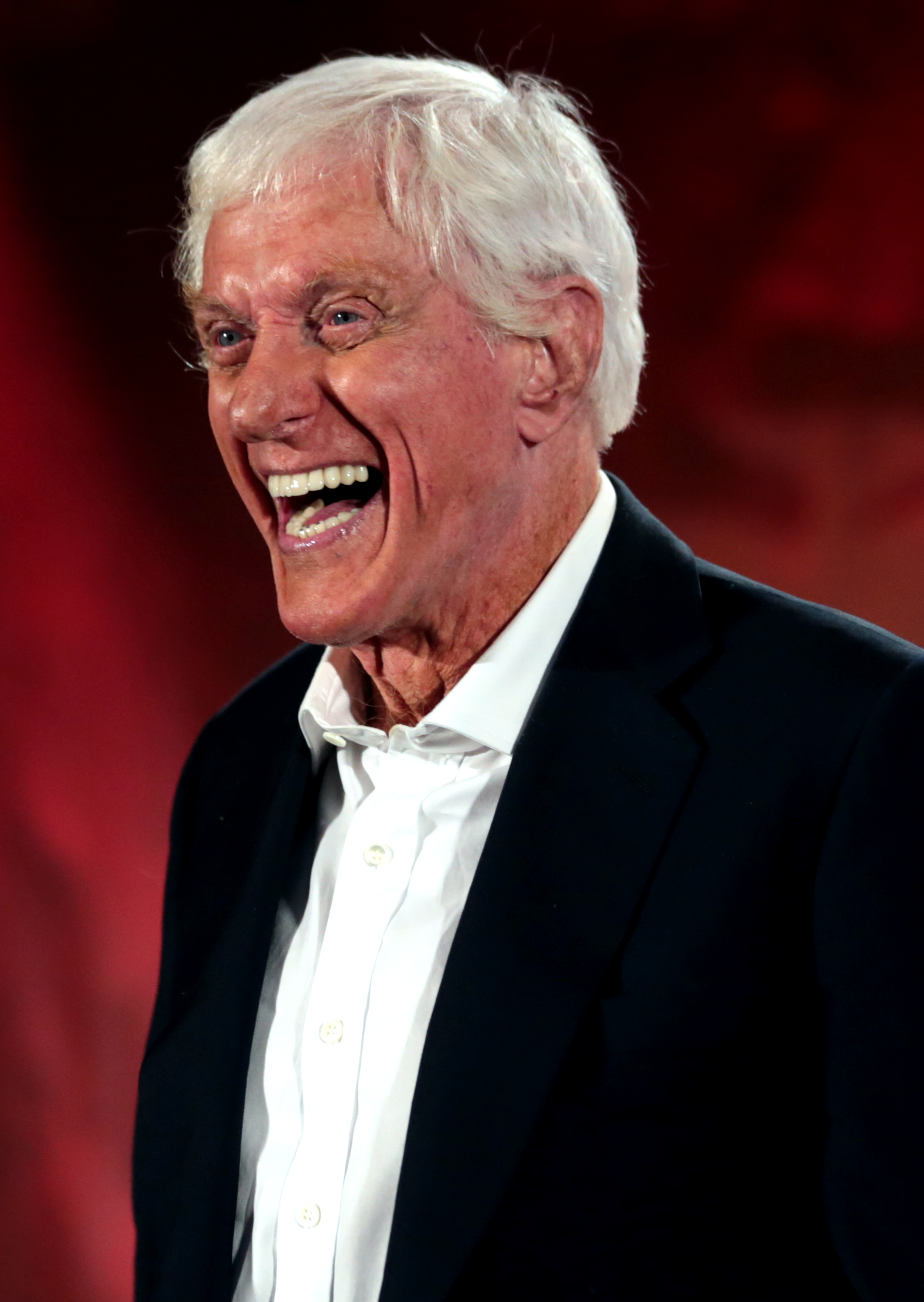
Dick Van Dyke, who played Bert and Mr. Dawes Sr. in the 1964 film, appears in the film as Mr. Dawes Jr., a role originated by Arthur Malet in the previous film.

- Emily Blunt as Mary Poppins.
- Lin-Manuel Miranda as Jack, a cockney lamplighter and former apprentice of Bert from the original film, taking over as his role as Mary's best friend.
- Ben Whishaw as Michael Banks, Jane's younger brother and father of Annabel, John, and Georgie, who is a widower now working as a part-time teller at Fidelity Fiduciary Bank and is a struggling artist. Matthew Garber portrayed the character in the original film.
- Emily Mortimer as Jane Banks, Michael's older sister and aunt to Annabel, John, and Georgie, who is now working as a union organiser. Karen Dotrice, who portrayed the character in the original film, makes a cameo appearance as an elegant woman who asks Jane for directions.
- Julie Walters as Ellen, Michael's and Jane's long-time housekeeper. The character was previously portrayed by Hermione Baddeley in the original film.
- Nathanael Saleh as John Banks, the oldest Banks child, Michael's elder son and Jane's nephew.
- Pixie Davies as Annabel Banks, the middle Banks child, Michael's only daughter and Jane's niece.
- Joel Dawson as Georgie Banks, the youngest Banks child, Michael's younger son and Jane's nephew.
- Colin Firth as William "Weatherall" Wilkins, the corrupt new chairman of Fidelity Fiduciary Bank, Mr. Dawes Jr.'s nephew and Michael's boss.
  - Firth also voices a wolf representing Wilkins in the animated Royal Doulton Bowl sequence.
- Meryl Streep as Topsy, Mary Poppins's eccentric Eastern European cousin called Tatiana Antanasia Cositori Topotrepolovsky ("Topsy" for short) who runs a fix-it workshop in London.
- David Warner as Admiral Boom, a retired naval officer who now uses a wheelchair. Reginald Owen portrayed the character in the first movie.
- Jim Norton as Mr. Binnacle, Boom's first mate. Don Barclay portrayed the character in the original film.
- Jeremy Swift as Hamilton Gooding, a lawyer who is one of Wilkins' associates.
  - Swift also voices a badger representing Gooding in the animated Royal Doulton Bowl sequence.
- Kobna Holdbrook-Smith as Templeton Frye, a friendly lawyer who is one of Wilkins' associates.
  - Holdbrook-Smith also voices a weasel representing Frye in the animated Royal Doulton Bowl sequence.
- Angela Lansbury as the Balloon Lady, a kindly old woman who sells balloons at the park. The part was written to be a cameo role for Julie Andrews who portrayed Mary Poppins in the original film, but she turned the role down as she felt her presence would unfairly take attention away from Emily Blunt.
- Dick Van Dyke as Mr. Dawes Jr., the retired chairman of Fidelity Fiduciary Bank and Wilkins' uncle. Just as in the original film, Van Dyke is credited as "Navckid Keyd" which unscrambles during the credits. The character was portrayed by Arthur Malet in the original film, while Van Dyke previously portrayed both Bert and Mr. Dawes Sr. (Mr. Dawes Jr.'s late father).
- Noma Dumezweni as Miss Penny Farthing, Wilkins' secretary.
- Sudha Bhuchar as Miss Lark, the Banks's neighbour. Marjorie Bennett played the role in the first film.
- Steve Nicolson as the Park Keeper.
- Tarik Frimpong as Angus, Jack's fellow lamplighter.

=== Voice acting cast ===
Besides the animated counterparts of the characters done by Firth, Swift, and Holdbrook-Smith, the rest of the voice roles consist of:

- Edward Hibbert as Mary Poppins' parrot umbrella. He was previously voiced by David Tomlinson in the original film.
- Chris O'Dowd as Shamus the Coachman Dog, an Irish Setter in the animated Royal Doulton Music Hall sequence.
- Mark Addy as Clyde, a horse in the animated Royal Doulton Music Hall sequence.

== Production ==
=== Development ===
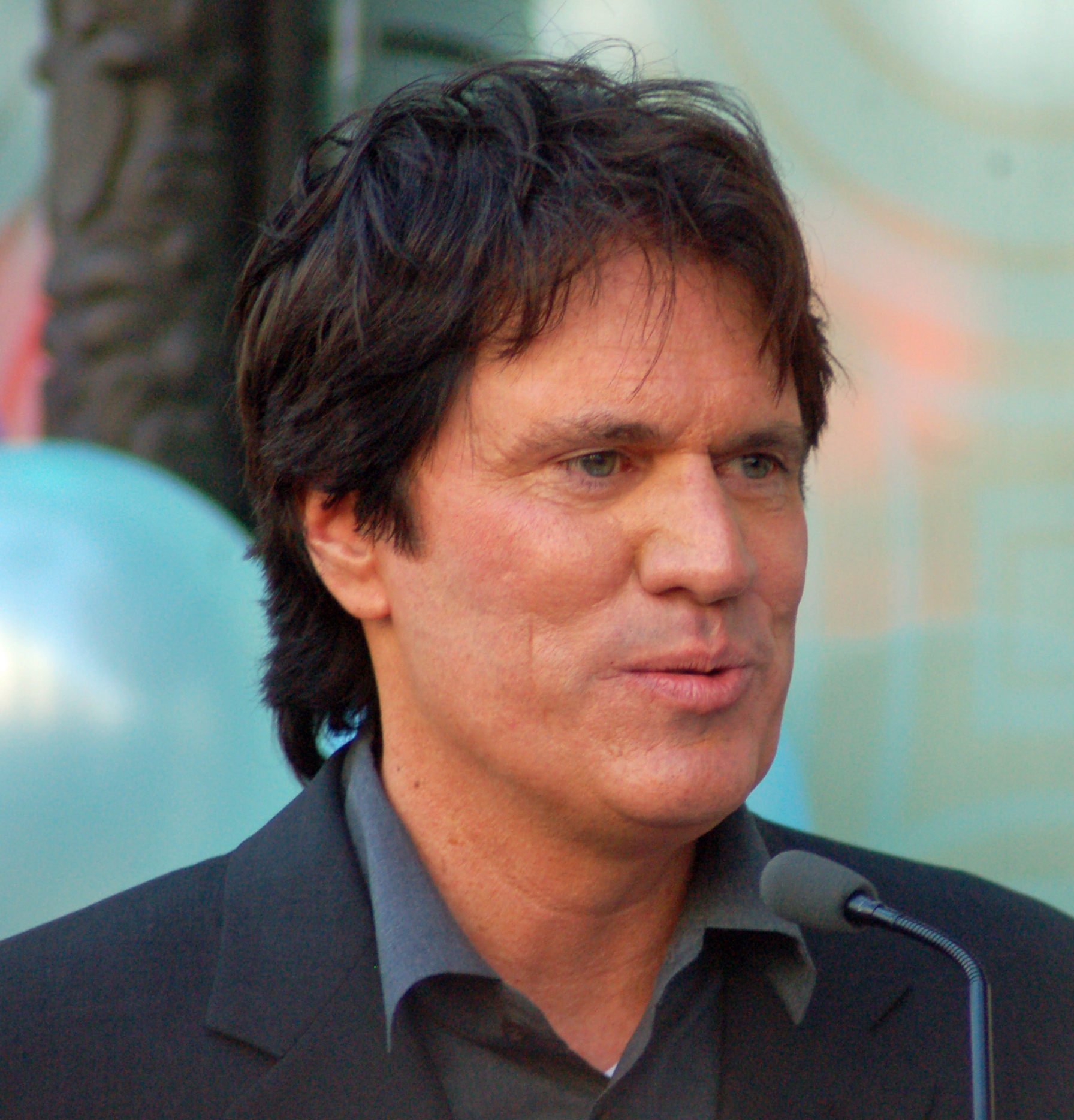
Director and co-producer Rob Marshall

A sequel to Mary Poppins had been gestating in development hell since the first film's release in 1964. Walt Disney attempted to produce a sequel a year later but was rejected by the author P. L. Travers, who dismissed Disney's first adaptation. In the late 1980s, the chairman of Walt Disney Studios, Jeffrey Katzenberg, and the vice-president of live-action production, Martin Kaplan, approached Travers with the idea of a sequel set years after the first film, with the Banks children now as adults and Julie Andrews reprising her role as an older Mary Poppins. Travers again rejected the concept except for Andrews' return, suggesting a sequel set one year after the original film with Andrews reprising the role. That idea also did not come to fruition, however, because Travers would not go ahead without certain caveats that the company would not concede, including barring Poppins' clothing from being red. Michael Jackson was considered to play a role to replace Bert.

Travers' attempt to make a sequel to the first film with her involvement was not deterred. In the 1980s, she and Brian Sibley, a good friend whom she met in the 1970s, wrote a screenplay for a sequel titled Mary Poppins Comes Back, based on the parts from Travers' second Mary Poppins book unused in the 1964 film. Sibley then wrote a letter to Roy E. Disney about making the film, to which Disney contracted them to supply a film treatment. According to Sibley, Travers wrote notes on his script ideas and though she rejected some of them, she liked some of them, including replacing Bert with his brother, an ice cream man in a park in Edwardian London who similarly served as Mary's friend and potential admirer. Four months later, however, casting issues emerged, as Andrews temporarily retired from making films and was not interested in reprising her role as Mary Poppins. It was tricky to find an actor to play Bert's brother, though an executive suggested that singer Michael Jackson was right for the part. The planned sequel was eventually cancelled because of a combination of issues: the casting problems and the fact that new executives took over the company.

The 2004 release of the 40th Anniversary DVD of the original film contained a trivia track that stated, in regards to a possible sequel, "One day the wind may change again ...". On 14 September 2015, Walt Disney Pictures president Sean Bailey had pitched a new Mary Poppins film to Rob Marshall, John DeLuca, and Marc Platt, as the team had produced Into the Woods for the studio the year prior. With approval from Travers' estate, Disney greenlit the project with the film taking place 25 years after the first featuring a standalone narrative, based on the remaining seven books in the series. Marshall was hired to direct, while DeLuca and Platt would serve as producers along with Marshall. David Magee was hired to write the script.

=== Casting ===
On 18 February 2016, Emily Blunt entered negotiations to play the title role in the sequel. On 24 February 2016, Lin-Manuel Miranda was cast in the film to play Jack, a lamplighter. In April 2016, Disney confirmed that the film was in development and Blunt and Miranda's castings. In May, Disney announced the film's title as Mary Poppins Returns. By July 2016, Meryl Streep had entered negotiations to join the cast to play cousin Topsy, and would be officially cast in September. Ben Whishaw was in negotiations to play the adult Michael Banks in August, with Emily Mortimer cast as the adult Jane Banks, and Colin Firth joined the film as William Weatherall Wilkins, president of the Fidelity Fiduciary Bank in October.

In February 2017, Angela Lansbury was cast to play the Balloon Lady. Julie Andrews, who portrayed Poppins in the 1964 film, was approached to do a cameo (possibly as the Balloon Lady before the part was offered to Lansbury) in the sequel but turned down the offer as she wanted it to be "Emily's show". Dick Van Dyke, who portrayed Bert and Mr. Dawes Sr. in the original film, returns in the sequel as the latter's son, Mr. Dawes Jr., replacing Arthur Malet, who died in 2013. Karen Dotrice, who played the young Jane Banks in the original, has a cameo appearance in the film.

=== Filming ===
Principal photography on the film began on 10 February 2017, at Shepperton Studios in Surrey, England. Eight soundstages were used to build practical sets for the film, including Cherry Tree Lane, and the enormous abandoned park, where a big part of the musical number, "Trip a Little Light Fantastic", was set.

Scenes requiring green and blue screens for visual effects were first filmed on J and K Stages with physical set pieces for the cast to interact with, which were then swapped out in post-production with animation. Unlike the first film, which was wholly shot within soundstages in Hollywood, filming also took place on location, including outside the Bank of England in March 2017, and outside Buckingham Palace in April 2017. Principal photography was wrapped by July 2017.

=== Visual effects and animation ===
The visual effects were provided by Cinesite, Framestore, Luma Pictures, Pixomondo, the Government of Victoria with the assistance of Film Victoria (both in Australia), and TPO VFX and supervised by Christian Irles, Christian Kaestner, Brendan Seals, Matthew Tinsley and Matt Johnson. Like the original film, this film includes a sequence combining live action and traditional hand-drawn animation. According to Marshall, he asked for an animated/live-action sequence rather than employing modern CGI animation, feeling that it was vital to hold on the classic hand-drawn animation to protect the spirit of the original film.

The animation sequence was developed and overall supervision was handled by Jim Capobianco, with Ken Duncan supervising physical animation production at his studio in Pasadena, California. Over 70 animation artists specializing in hand-drawn 2D animation from Walt Disney Animation Studios, Pixar Animation Studios, and other animation studios were recruited for the sequence. The animated drawings were created using pencil and paper and scanned onto the computer to be digitally inked and painted. Character designer James Woods and animator James Baxter also helped redesign the penguins from the first film. All of the hand-drawn animation was created by Duncan's animation studio, Duncan Studio, in Pasadena.

=== Musical score and soundtrack album ===
The music and score for the film was composed by Marc Shaiman, with song lyrics written by Scott Wittman and Shaiman. The complete soundtrack album was released by Walt Disney Records on 7 December 2018. Shaiman had heard about the film in 2014 and begged director Marshall to be allowed to write the songs for the film. Shaiman, in regards to working on the film, stated "Our love for the original movie overrode our fears, we re-embraced the thing we loved as children. There's no need for irony or snark. This is our love letter to the original".

== Release ==
Mary Poppins Returns was originally scheduled to be released on 25 December 2018. However, in July 2018, it was moved up from its original release date to 19 December 2018. Its release marks the longest interval between a live-action film and its sequel in cinematic history, at 54 years.

=== Marketing ===
On 22 November 2018, Disney released a special episode of 20/20 on ABC called "Mary Poppins Returns: Behind the Magic" which included an extended look of the film, with advance tickets for the film going on sale along with the digital pre-order of the soundtrack and the release of two tracks off the soundtrack, "The Place Where Lost Things Go" and "Trip a Little Light Fantastic".

=== Home media release ===
Mary Poppins Returns was released by Walt Disney Studios Home Entertainment on Ultra HD Blu-ray, Blu-ray and DVD on March 19, 2019.

== Reception ==
=== Box office ===
The film grossed $172 million in the United States and Canada, and $190.6 million in other territories, for a total worldwide gross of $362.5 million against a production budget of $130 million.

In the United States and Canada, the film was projected to gross $49–51 million from 4,090 theatres over its first five days (including around $35 million in its first weekend) and a total of $75 million over its first week of release. It made $4.8 million on its first day of release and $4.1 million on its second, and went on to gross $23.5 million its opening weekend (a total of $32.3 million over its first five days), finishing below expectations, but second at the box office behind fellow newcomer Aquaman. It then made $6.1 million on Monday and $11.5 million on Christmas Day for total week opening of $49.9 million. In its second weekend, the film increased by 20.5% to $28.4 million, remaining in second, and in its third weekend made $15.9 million, finishing third behind Aquaman and newcomer Escape Room.

=== Critical response ===
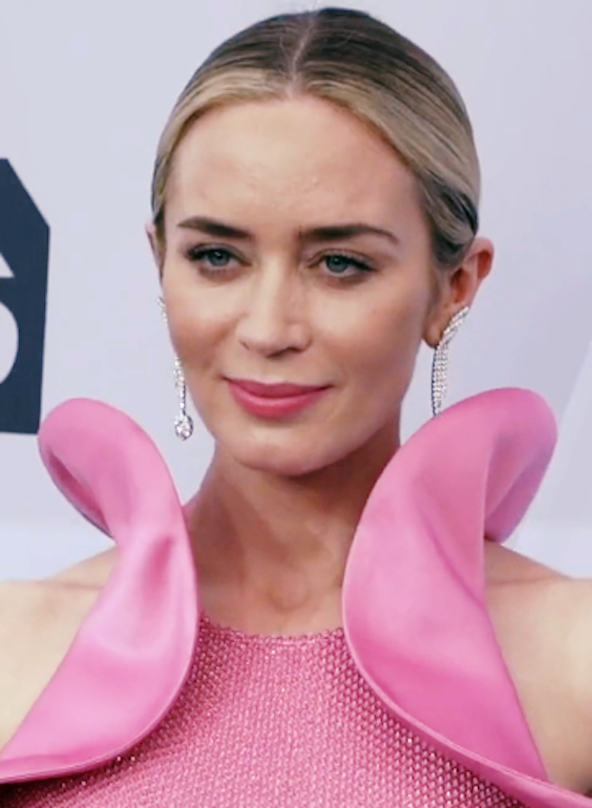
Emily Blunt's performance as Mary Poppins received critical acclaim.

On Rotten Tomatoes, the film holds an approval rating of 79% based on 379 reviews, with an average rating of 7.3/10. The website's critical consensus reads: "Mary Poppins Returns relies on the magic of its classic forebear to cast a familiar – but still solidly effective – family-friendly spell." On Metacritic, the film has a weighted average score of 66 out of 100, based on 54 critics, indicating "generally favorable reviews". Audiences polled by CinemaScore gave the film an average grade of "A−" on an A+ to F scale, while those at PostTrak gave it an 84% overall positive score and a 62% "definite recommend".

Peter Bradshaw of The Guardian gave the film 3 out of 5 stars, writing: "Emily Blunt is the magical nanny in this scarily accomplished clone-pastiche sequel, which starts terrifically and ends cloyingly – just like the original." Geoffrey MacNab of The Independent wrote: "The nostalgia here could easily have been very cloying. Instead, it adds to the richness and mystery. In an era of superhero franchises where sequels to successful movies turn up almost instantly, Mary Poppins's return shows that sometimes it pays to wait. Half a century on, her allure hasn't faded at all." Owen Gleiberman of Variety deemed the film a "rapturous piece of nostalgia"; lauded Blunt's take on Mary Poppins and described her casting as "practically perfect"; and gave his praise to Marshall's direction, as well as the production design, musical score, songs, and the supporting cast (particularly Miranda, Whishaw, Firth, and Streep). He compared the film's quality and tone to that of 1960s musicals, and its nostalgia to Star Wars: The Force Awakens. David Rooney of The Hollywood Reporter wrote: "Its old-fashioned, honest sentimentality plasters a smile across your face and plants a tear in your eye, often simultaneously." He lauded the work of Blunt (which he labelled as "preening vanity with unmistakable warmth") and the supporting cast, as well as the costumes, sets, musical score, and songs, referring to the music as the best since Hairspray and "full of personality and humor, and reverential without being slavish in their adherence to the musical patterns of the first film".

Brian Truitt of USA Today described the film as a "comforting nostalgia-fest" and "satisfaction in spit-spot fashion", and commended the performances of Blunt and Miranda, Marshall's knack for musical numbers, and Shaiman's "swinging delight" original score. The Atlantic's Christopher Orr remarked: "Mary Poppins Returns serves as a reminder that, for all its global scope and hegemonic ambition, Disney still has a little magic left up its sleeve." He called the film a "highly likable diversion", and praised it for balancing the familiar and the new. Orr also praised Blunt's version of Mary Poppins as "excellent", finding it "a little chillier and more austere", and "truer to the spirit of the heroine of P. L. Travers's books". Peter Travers of Rolling Stone gave the film three out of five stars and praised Blunt's portrayal of the title character. Despite feeling it did not live up to the original film, Travers nevertheless praised the sequel, remarking: "Mary Poppins Returns shows it has the power to leave you deliriously happy". Time magazine's Stephanie Zacharek wrote that "Mary Poppins Returns honors the spirit of its predecessor". She also highlighted Blunt's interpretation of the title character (describing the performance as close to "Travers's original vision"), as well as the costumes, production values, and 2D animation sequences, but found Shaiman's and Wittman's songs to be one of the film's "weaker points".

Will Gompertz of the BBC gave the film two out of five stars, stating: "It looks fantastic, the special effects are special, and a great deal of money has clearly been spent in the hope of making it supercalifragilisticexpialidocious. All of which is great. Except the movie – unlike the eponymous super nanny – never quite takes off." Manohla Dargis of The New York Times wrote that "Mary Poppins Returns looks, feels and sounds like a sales pitch" and "ratchets up more than the family's existential stakes", but praised the "emotional rawness" of Whishaw's acting; she called Shaiman's and Wittman's songs "the gravest disappointment", stressing that "there's nothing here with comparable melodic or lyrical staying power" to the Sherman Brothers' songs from the 1964 film. Mick LaSalle of the San Francisco Chronicle regarded the sequel as inferior to the original, feeling that the story did not deliver, and gave a mixed review regarding the songs: he described some of the songs as "forgettable", "indifferent", and "dreadful", but singled out others, such as "Lovely London Sky" and "The Place Where the Lost Things Go", as some of the best. LaSalle stated that "Mary Poppins Returns might have had a chance had the movie not tried to compete with the original in terms of scale. With 20 minutes of song and dance numbers cut, the movie really could have been better – not great, but better."

=== Accolades ===
Award	Date of ceremony	Category	Recipient(s)	Result	Ref.
American Film Institute	January 4, 2019	Top 10 Films of the Year	Mary Poppins Returns	Won	
Academy Awards	February 24, 2019	Best Costume Design	Sandy Powell (Note: Powell also earned another nomination in the category for her work on The Favourite.)	Nominated	
Academy Awards	February 24, 2019	Best Original Score	Marc Shaiman	Nominated	
Academy Awards	February 24, 2019	Best Original Song	"The Place Where Lost Things Go" – Marc Shaiman and Scott Wittman	Nominated	
Academy Awards	February 24, 2019	Best Production Design	John Myhre and Gordon Sim	Nominated	
Annie Awards	February 2, 2019	Best Animated Special Production	Mary Poppins Returns	Won	
Annie Awards	February 2, 2019	Outstanding Achievement for Character Animation in a Live Action Production	Chris Sauve, James Baxter and Sandro Cleuzo	Won	
Annie Awards	February 2, 2019	Outstanding Achievement for Character Design in an Animated Feature Production	James Woods	Nominated	
Annie Awards	February 2, 2019	Outstanding Achievement for Production Design in an Animated Feature Production	Jeff Turley	Nominated	
Annie Awards	February 2, 2019	Outstanding Achievement for Storyboarding in an Animated Feature Production	Ovi Nedelcu	Nominated	
Art Directors Guild Awards	February 2, 2019	Excellence in Production Design for a Fantasy Film	John Myhre	Nominated	
British Academy Film Awards	February 10, 2019	Best Original Music	Marc Shaiman	Nominated	
British Academy Film Awards	February 10, 2019	Best Production Design	John Myhre and Gordon Sim	Nominated	
British Academy Film Awards	February 10, 2019	Best Costume Design	Sandy Powell	Nominated	
Capri Hollywood International Film Festival	January 2, 2019	Best Costume Design	Sandy Powell	Won	
Casting Society of America	January 31, 2019	Feature Big Budget – Comedy	Bernard Telsey, Tiffany Little Canfield, Conrad Woolfe and Sarah Trevis	Nominated	
Chita Rivera Awards	May 19, 2019	Theatrical Release	Rob Marshall and John DeLuca; Joey Pizzi; Tara Nichole Hughes; Marlon Pelayo	Won	
Costume Designers Guild Awards	February 19, 2019	Excellence in Period Film	Sandy Powell	Nominated	
Critics' Choice Movie Awards	January 13, 2019	Best Picture	Mary Poppins Returns	Nominated	
Critics' Choice Movie Awards	January 13, 2019	Best Actress	Emily Blunt	Nominated	
Critics' Choice Movie Awards	January 13, 2019	Best Production Design	John Myhre and Gordon Sim	Nominated	
Critics' Choice Movie Awards	January 13, 2019	Best Costume Design	Sandy Powell	Nominated	
Critics' Choice Movie Awards	January 13, 2019	Best Visual Effects	Mary Poppins Returns	Nominated	
Critics' Choice Movie Awards	January 13, 2019	Best Actress in a Comedy	Emily Blunt	Nominated	
Critics' Choice Movie Awards	January 13, 2019	Best Score	Marc Shaiman	Nominated	
Critics' Choice Movie Awards	January 13, 2019	Best Song	"The Place Where Lost Things Go"	Nominated	
Critics' Choice Movie Awards	January 13, 2019	Best Song	"Trip a Little Light Fantastic"	Nominated	
Detroit Film Critics Society	December 3, 2018	Best Use of Music	Mary Poppins Returns	Nominated	
Georgia Film Critics Association	January 12, 2019	Best Original Song	"The Place Where Lost Things Go" – Marc Shaiman and Scott Wittman	Nominated	
Georgia Film Critics Association	January 12, 2019	Best Original Song	"Trip a Little Light Fantastic" – Marc Shaiman and Scott Wittman	Nominated	
Golden Globe Awards	January 6, 2019	Best Motion Picture – Musical or Comedy	Mary Poppins Returns	Nominated	
Golden Globe Awards	January 6, 2019	Best Actor in a Motion Picture – Musical or Comedy	Lin-Manuel Miranda	Nominated	
Golden Globe Awards	January 6, 2019	Best Actress in a Motion Picture – Musical or Comedy	Emily Blunt	Nominated	
Golden Globe Awards	January 6, 2019	Best Original Score	Marc Shaiman	Nominated	
Golden Reel Awards	February 17, 2019	Outstanding Achievement in Sound Editing – Dialogue and ADR	Renée Tondelli, Heather Gross and Alexa Zimmerman	Nominated	
Golden Reel Awards	February 17, 2019	Outstanding Achievement in Sound Editing – Musical	Jennifer L. Dunnington, Jim Bruening, Lewis Morison and Fiona Cruickshank	Nominated	
Golden Trailer Awards	May 29, 2019	Best Animation/Family TV Spot	Mary Poppins Returns ("Place")	Won	
Golden Trailer Awards	May 29, 2019	Best Billboard	Mary Poppins Returns ("The Grove Billboard")	Nominated	
Golden Trailer Awards	May 29, 2019	Best Home Ent Family/Animation	Mary Poppins Returns ("Be A Child")	Won	
Golden Trailer Awards	May 29, 2019	Best Motion Poster	Mary Poppins Returns ("Weather Responsive Motion Poster")	Won	
Golden Trailer Awards	May 29, 2019	Best Original Score TV Spot	Mary Poppins Returns ("Place")	Nominated	
Grammy Awards	January 26, 2020	Best Score Soundtrack for Visual Media	Marc Shaiman	Nominated	
Guild of Music Supervisors Awards	February 13, 2019	Best Music Supervision for Films Budgeted Over $25 Million	Michael Higham and Paul Gemignani	Nominated	
Guild of Music Supervisors Awards	February 13, 2019	Best Song Written and/or Recorded Created for a Film	"Trip a Little Light Fantastic"	Nominated	
Heartland Film Festival	October 11 – 21, 2018	Truly Moving Picture Award	Mary Poppins Returns	Won	
Hollywood Music in Media Awards	November 14, 2018	Original Score – Sci-Fi/Fantasy/Horror Film	Marc Shaiman	Nominated	
Hollywood Music in Media Awards	November 14, 2018	Original Song – Sci-Fi/Fantasy/Horror Film	"The Place Where Lost Things Go" – Marc Shaiman and Scott Wittman	Nominated	
Hollywood Music in Media Awards	November 14, 2018	Original Song – Sci-Fi/Fantasy/Horror Film	"Trip a Little Light Fantastic" – Marc Shaiman and Scott Wittman	Nominated	
Humanitas Prize	February 8, 2019	Family Feature Film	Mary Poppins Returns	Won	
Kids' Choice Awards	March 22, 2019	Favorite Movie	Mary Poppins Returns	Nominated	
Kids' Choice Awards	March 22, 2019	Favorite Movie Actress	Emily Blunt	Nominated	
London Film Critics Circle	January 20, 2019	British/Irish Actress of the Year	Emily Blunt	Nominated	
Make-Up Artists and Hair Stylists Guild	February 16, 2019	Best Period and/or Character Make-Up	Peter Robb-King and Paula Price	Nominated	
Make-Up Artists and Hair Stylists Guild	February 16, 2019	Best Period and/or Character Hair Styling	Peter Robb-King and Paula Price	Nominated	
Movieguide Awards	February 8, 2019	Best Movies for Families	Mary Poppins Returns	Nominated	
National Board of Review	January 8, 2019	Top Ten Films	Mary Poppins Returns	Won	
Palm Springs International Film Festival	January 3, 2019	Best Ensemble Performance	Mary Poppins Returns	Won	
Satellite Awards	February 17, 2019	Best Motion Picture, Comedy or Musical	Mary Poppins Returns	Nominated	
Satellite Awards	February 17, 2019	Best Actor in a Motion Picture, Comedy or Musical	Lin-Manuel Miranda	Nominated	
Satellite Awards	February 17, 2019	Best Actress in a Motion Picture, Comedy or Musical	Emily Blunt	Nominated	
Satellite Awards	February 17, 2019	Best Original Song	"Can You Imagine That?" – Marc Shaiman and Scott Wittman	Nominated	
Satellite Awards	February 17, 2019	Best Art Direction and Production Design	John Myhre	Won	
Satellite Awards	February 17, 2019	Best Sound (Editing or Mixing)	Mary Poppins Returns	Nominated	
Saturn Awards	September 13, 2019	Best Fantasy Film	Mary Poppins Returns	Nominated	
Saturn Awards	September 13, 2019	Best Actress	Emily Blunt	Nominated	
Saturn Awards	September 13, 2019	Best Supporting Actor	Lin-Manuel Miranda	Nominated	
Saturn Awards	September 13, 2019	Best Music	Marc Shaiman	Won	
Saturn Awards	September 13, 2019	Best Production Design	John Myhre	Nominated	
Saturn Awards	September 13, 2019	Best Costume Design	Sandy Powell	Nominated	
Screen Actors Guild Awards	January 27, 2019	Outstanding Performance by a Female Actor in a Leading Role	Emily Blunt	Nominated	
Seattle Film Critics Society	December 17, 2018	Best Costume Design	Sandy Powell	Nominated	
Seattle Film Critics Society	December 17, 2018	Best Production Design	John Myhre and Gordon Sim	Nominated	
Teen Choice Awards	August 11, 2019	Choice Movie: Fantasy	Mary Poppins Returns	Nominated	
Teen Choice Awards	August 11, 2019	Choice Movie: Fantasy Actor	Lin-Manuel Miranda	Nominated	
Teen Choice Awards	August 11, 2019	Choice Movie: Fantasy Actress	Emily Blunt	Nominated	
Washington D.C. Area Film Critics Association	December 3, 2018	Best Production Design	John Myhre	Nominated	

== Sequel ==
By May 2023, Marshall stated that a third movie is in active development.
