= 3D Na'Tee =

American rapper (born 1986)

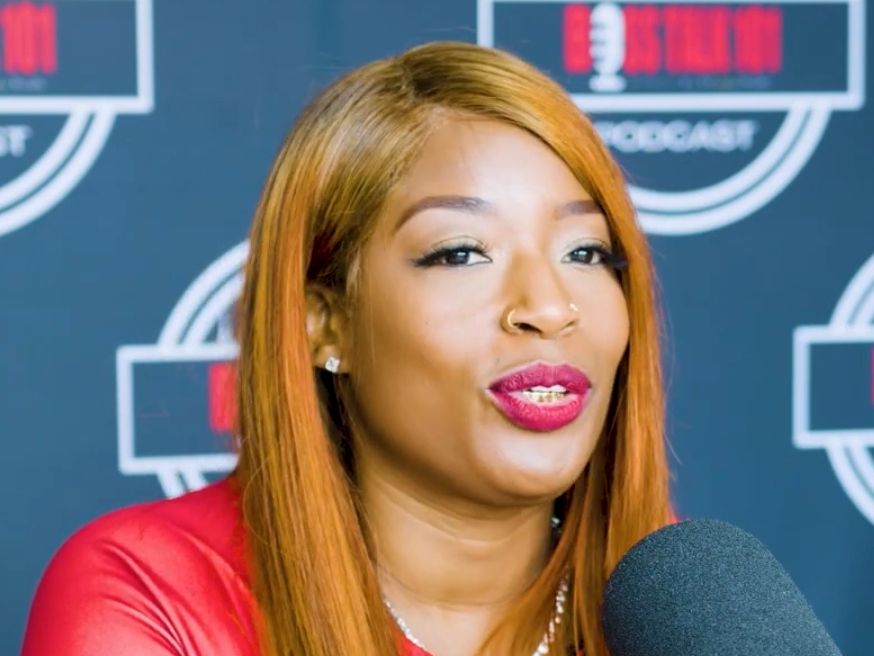
- James in 2024

Background information
- Born: Samantha Davon James; December 18, 1986 (age 39); New Orleans, Louisiana
- Genres: Hip hop
- Occupation: Rapper
- Years active: 1998–present
- Labels: Already Legendary, BMB
- Website: www.3dnatee.com

Samantha Davon James (born December 18, 1986), known professionally as 3D Na'Tee, is an American rapper, songwriter, and video director. 3D Na'Tee has been featured on several national media outlets such as MTV, The Source Magazine, XXL Magazine, The Fader Magazine, RapRadar and RapRehab. She has also received attention from Louisiana newspapers and music magazines.

== Early life and education ==
Samantha Davon James was born on December 18, 1986, in New Orleans, Louisiana, and grew up in the 3rd Ward. She attended New Orleans Center for Creative Arts for visual arts.

== Career ==
In 1999, James began recording with local label called Clientell Records. Over the next five years, she recorded multiple mixtapes under the "Snypa Squad" and was featured on other projects by Clientell Records. However, in 2006, a year after Hurricane Katrina, Clientell Records dismantled and 3D Na'Tee, who had previously established herself as a battler rapper amongst the local rap scene in New Orleans, released her first mix tape project 3's Company Vol.1: The Rapper, The Hustler, the Diva followed by Volume 2 in 2007. After the release of her second project, she appeared on The Kush 2 DVD which was produced by YMCMB president Mack Maine. The DVD featured other Cash Money/Young Money artists such as Lil Wayne, Nicki Minaj, and Birdman as well as Curren$y of Warner Bros. Records.

After the local success of her first two releases and her appearance on The Kush 2, James released her third mixtape, Heavy Is the head That Wears the Crown, followed by a music video for the song Guess Who's Coming 2 Dinner. That video piqued the interest of G-Unit Records affiliate and Shade 45 Sirius XM radio host Nelson Gomez, who invited her to New York for an interview on his XM show, as well as on rapper 50 Cent‘s ThisIs50.com website. Soon after, the talk of her third release got her featured in HipHop Weekly Magazine by Benzino, former co-owner of The Source Magazine.

Because of video releases like Guess Who's Coming 2 Dinner, which spoofed many mainstream hip-hop artists, James' music has been described as controversial and sometimes offensive. That song also shared the title of her mixtape released in 2010.

The mixtape Guess Who's Coming 2 Dinner led to 3D Na'Tee being nominated for a total of 5 NOLA Hip-Hop Awards. She won three awards (the most awards won by a single artist) for Lyricist of the Year, Mixtape of the Year, and Female Artist of the Year. The mixtape included collaborations from Curren$y (courtesy of Warner Bros. Records), Ebony Eyez, and Babs Bunny (formerly of Sean "Diddy" Combs-founded group, Da Band).

In early 2011, James was featured on MTV's SuckerFree Freestyle, hosted by DJ Envy. 3D Na'Tee and Syleena collaborated on a song called “Go Head”.

On July 27, 2011, James released a video for “Switch”, which she shot and edited herself. The song included several previously released instrumental versions of songs produced by producer Timbaland. This video earned her a nomination for Director of the Year and an award for Video of the Year. Because of the momentum the “Switch” video gained the day of its release, Timbaland viewed it online, and in less than 24 hours, he flew James to Miami's Hit Factory Studio to work with her on her next project, The Coronation. After several months spent traveling with Timbaland and other artists signed to his label, a contract was presented to 3D Na'Tee to sign to Timbaland's production company Mosely Music Group and to be managed by members of Timbaland's management team. 3D Na'Tee and Timbaland later announced via Twitter that she was no longer a part of Timbaland's company because she decided not to sign the contract presented. In a later interview, James explained that there was no ill feelings towards Timbaland and cited her reasons for not signing were strictly because of contractual clauses that could not be agreed upon.

Exactly two years after James last mixtape release, she released her highly anticipated street album The Coronation, which featured artists like Keri Hilson, Young Fletcher, and Lyrica Anderson. The Coronation also featured production from Mizay Entertainment's Lex Luger, Maybach Music Group‘s Yung Shun, Heartbeatz, Casa Di, Versive Manhattan, Serious Beats, Da Smokestarz, among others.

In August 2012, it was announced by Sirius Satellite radio host DJ Skee that the first release from The Coronation, entitled “No Love”, was the #9 most requested song in the country. The Coronation's second release, “Lil Kim”, gained recognition, including being featured on both The Source and The Fader Magazine’s websites. The song and its video (directed by Charley Mac), gained attention from many hip-hop artists such as Trina, Missy Elliott, and Chamillionaire, who featured 3D Na'Tee's video on his social site chamillionaire.com.

== Discography ==
=== Albums ===
- The Coronation (2012)
- The Regime (2016)
- Songs That Didn't Make the Tape, Vol. 1 (2017)
- Uptown Butterfly (2023)

=== Mixtapes ===
- 2008: Heavy Is the Head That Wears the Crown (2008)
- 2010: Guess Who's Coming 2 Dinner (2010)
- 2012: The Coronation (2012)
