= Radio Disney Music Award for Fiercest Fans =

Radio Disney Award for fan-voted winners

- Awarded for: Fandom
- Country: United States
- Presented by: Radio Disney
- First award: 2013
- Final award: 2018
- Currently held by: BTS Army – BTS (2018)
- Website: radio.disney.com/radio-disney-music-awards

The Radio Disney Music Award for Fiercest Fans was first introduced in 2013. Initially titled So FANtastic – Fiercest Fans, the award was later shortened to Fiercest Fans as of the 2015 edition. Nominees and winners are determined solely through fan votes cast via Radio Disney's official website, as well as on Facebook and Twitter.

== Winners and nominees ==
=== 2010s ===
Year	Winner(s)	Nominees	Ref.
So FANtastic – Fiercest Fans
2013	Directioners (One Direction)	Beliebers (Justin Bieber); Mahomies (Austin Mahone); Selenators (Selena Gomez); Simpsonizers (Cody Simpson)	
2014	Swifties (Taylor Swift)	Directioners (One Direction); Katycats (Katy Perry)	
Fiercest Fans
2015	Harmonizers (Fifth Harmony)	Directioners (One Direction); R5Family (R5)	
2016	Harmonizers (Fifth Harmony)	Beliebers (Justin Bieber); Directioners (One Direction); Swifties (Taylor Swift)	
2017	Harmonizers (Fifth Harmony)	Beliebers (Justin Bieber); Megatronz (Meghan Trainor); Mendes Army (Shawn Mendes); Selenators (Selena Gomez)	
2018	BTS Army (BTS)	Mellogang (Marshmello); Megatronz (Meghan Trainor); Selenators (Selena Gomez); Mendes Army (Shawn Mendes)	

== Performers with multiple wins ==
3 wins

- Harmonizers (Fifth Harmony) - (consecutive)

== Performers with multiple nominations ==
4 nominations

- Directioners (One Direction)

3 nominations

- Beliebers (Justin Bieber)
- Selenators (Selena Gomez)
- Harmonizers (Fifth Harmony)

2 nominations

- Swifties (Taylor Swift)
- Megatronz (Meghan Trainor)
- Mendes Army (Shawn Mendes)
