= Tarik Frimpong =

Australian/Ghanaian actor

- Occupations: actor, singer

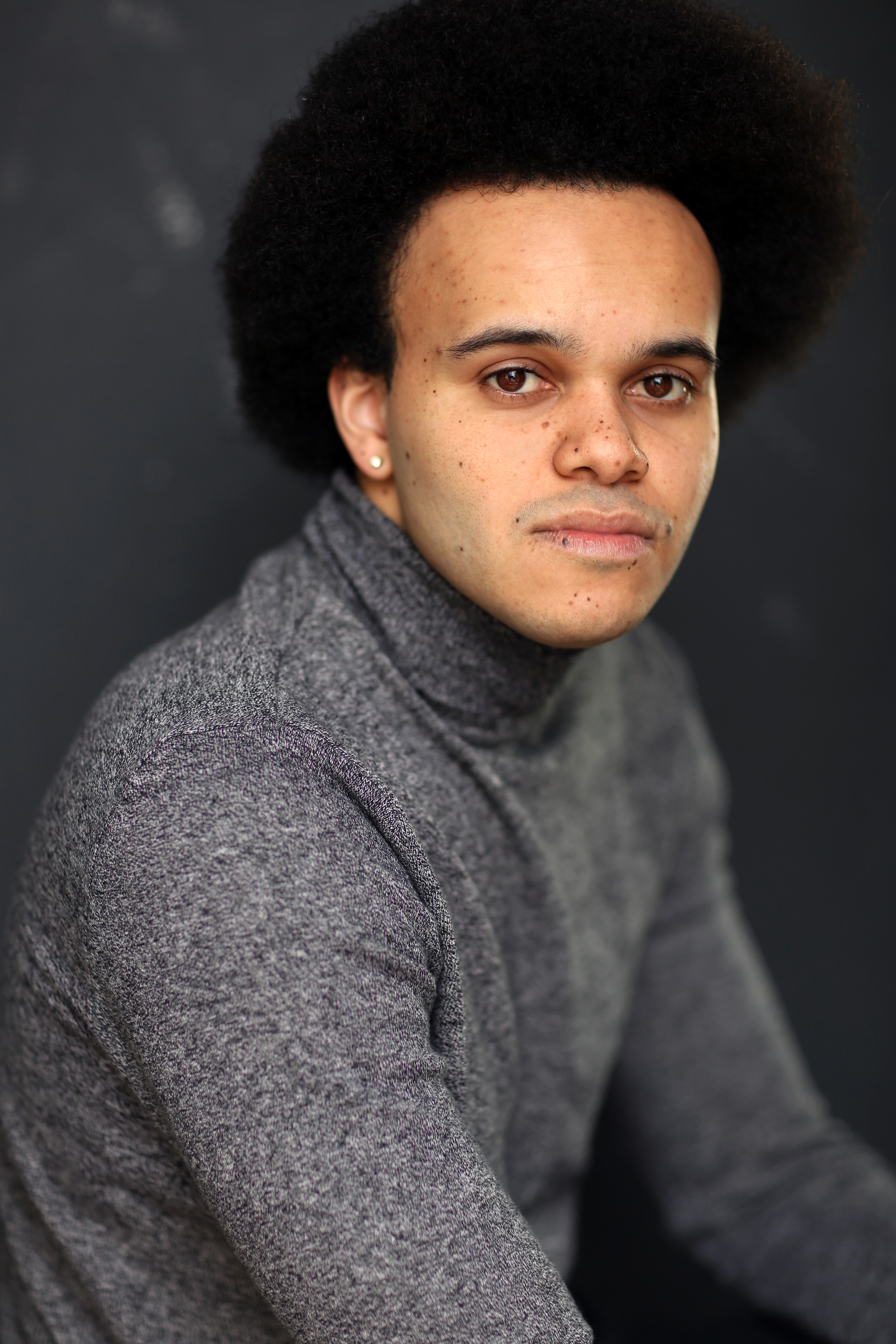
Tarik Frimpong photographed in London, by photographer Leigh Lothian.

Tarik Frimpong is an Australian/Ghanaian actor, singer and dancer from Melbourne. He made his feature film debut playing the role of Angus in Disney's 2018 film Mary Poppins Returns.

== Career ==
Tarik played the role of Young Simba in the Australian Production of The Lion King Musical. He also appeared in Bring It On: The Musical, playing the role of Twig in the Australian premiere. Tarik has appeared as Principal Standby in MADIBA: the Musical and he has appeared on the West End playing the role of Prince Abdullah in Disney's Aladdin the Musical. He also plays the Munchkin who says “Look, it’s Glinda!” in Wicked.

Tarik has danced for numerous recording artists including; Justin Bieber, FKA Twigs, Aston Merrygold, Missy Higgins, & Zhu.
