= Radio Disney Music Award for Best Female Artist =

Annual US music award

The following is a list of Radio Disney Music Award winners and nominees for Best Female Artist. Hilary Duff is the most awarded artist in this category with 4 wins.

== Winners and nominees ==
=== 2000s ===
Year	Winner	Nominees	Ref.
2001	Mandy Moore	Jessica Simpson; Britney Spears	
2002	Avril Lavigne	Jessica Simpson; Britney Spears	
2003	Hilary Duff	Avril Lavigne; Jessica Simpson	
2004	Hilary Duff	Avril Lavigne; JoJo	
2005	Hilary Duff	Lindsay Lohan; JoJo	
2006	Miley Cyrus	Kelly Clarkson; Rihanna; Vanessa Hudgens	
2007	Hilary Duff	Avril Lavigne; Kelly Clarkson; Miley Cyrus	

=== 2010s ===
Year	Winner	Nominees	Ref.
2013	Selena Gomez	Cher Lloyd; Taylor Swift; Bridgit Mendler	
2014	Demi Lovato	Taylor Swift; Katy Perry	
2015	Ariana Grande	Meghan Trainor; Taylor Swift	
2016	Selena Gomez	Adele; Meghan Trainor; Taylor Swift	
2017	Ariana Grande	Katy Perry; Lady Gaga; Meghan Trainor; Selena Gomez	
2018	Unrealized, only Best Artist		
