= Better When I'm Dancin' =

Promotional single by Meghan Trainor

from the album The Peanuts Movie (Original Motion Picture Soundtrack)
- B-side: "Bang Dem Sticks"
- Released: October 14, 2015
- Recorded: 2015
- Genre: Tropical
- Length: 2:56
- Label: Epic
- Songwriters: Meghan Trainor; Thaddeus Dixon
- Producers: Meghan Trainor; Justin Trainor

Music video
- "Better When I'm Dancin'" on YouTube

"Better When I'm Dancin'" is a song recorded by American singer-songwriter Meghan Trainor for the soundtrack to the film The Peanuts Movie, based on the popular comic strip of the same name created by cartoonist Charles M. Schulz. Trainor co-wrote it with Thaddeus Dixon and co-produced it with her brother, Justin. Epic Records released it on October 14, 2015, as the first and only promotional single from the soundtrack. Backed by an instrumentation of salsa-inspired drums, the tropical song has house influences and optimistic lyrics that were inspired by Trainor's fans.

"Better When I'm Dancin'" peaked at number 76 in Australia, and at number one on the US Bubbling Under Hot 100 Singles chart, certified Platinum in both countries. Philip Andelman directed the music video, which was released on October 14, 2015. Trainor has performed "Better When I'm Dancin'" live on several shows, including The Tonight Show Starring Jimmy Fallon and Dancing with the Stars. It was performed during her MTrain Tour (2015).

== Background and release ==
In July 2015, Trainor embarked on the MTrain Tour in support of her debut major-label studio album Title (2015). She accompanied herself on a ukulele and wrote "Better When I'm Dancin'" in "a short amount of time" on her tour bus. She approached American record producer Thaddeus Dixon to produce the song, against the wishes of her label Epic Records. Dixon recalled that Trainor said "if Thaddeus isn't producing it, I'm not doing it", and "stuck up" for him. Ultimately, Dixon ended up co-writing "Better When I'm Dancin'" with Trainor, while the latter co-produced it with her brother Justin Trainor.

In an interview with People that month, Trainor revealed that she was recording the song for The Peanuts Movie soundtrack. According to her, she was approached to soundtrack the film due to her ability to write "a song about confidence". An animated version of Trainor was used to promote the announcement on her Instagram account. A 20-second clip of "Better When I'm Dancin'" was made available on October 9, 2015. The song was released for digital download and streaming on October 14, 2015, being offered as an instant download with the soundtrack's pre-order. It was released to Italian contemporary hit radio stations on October 23. Trainor contributed an additional song called "Good to be Alive" to the Target edition of The Peanuts Movie soundtrack. "Better When I'm Dancin'" was released as a 7" Vinyl single on February 26, 2016, with the song "Bang Dem Sticks" as its B-side.

== Composition ==
"Better When I'm Dancin'"
A 17-second sample of "Better When I'm Dancin'"'s chorus, which was described as "breezy and harmless"

"Better When I'm Dancin'" was inspired by Trainor's fans, who "make [her] feel like a star on that stage". The song is about confidence and releasing your insecurities on the dance floor, and has been described as a "classic confidence-boosting tune". A tropical song, it has a peppy beat and optimistic message, along with instrumentation of salsa-inspired drums. "Better When I'm Dancin'" strays from Trainor's usual doo-wop-influenced musical style, being described as "breezy and harmless" with traces of house music. The song is written in the key of D major with a tempo of 128 beats per minute. In the verses, the song follows a chord progression of D–D/F♯–G5–D/F♯–Em7–Asus, and Trainor's vocals span from G_{4} to D_{6} in the song.

== Reception ==
Idolator's Robbie Daw wrote that "Better When I'm Dancin'" would make listeners realize that "everything [they] thought [they] knew about Meghan Trainor was a dark and twisted lie", calling it the "most un-Meghan Trainor song we've heard so far". Carolyn Menyes of Music Times stated that the song is "perfectly fitted for a children's movie but won't break much out of that space", the reason being that it is "overly cutesy". Time included it in their list of the Top 10 Worst Songs of 2015, criticizing how little the lyrics relate to the Peanuts franchise and noting that their "attitude of high-spirited joy aren't (sic) matched by a blandly indifferent delivery". "Better When I'm Dancin'" received a nomination for the Hollywood Music in Media Award for Best Original Song in an Animated Film at the 2015 Hollywood Music in Media Awards, and won the Radio Disney Music Award for Best Song That Makes You Smile at the 2016 Radio Disney Music Awards.

"Better When I'm Dancin'" topped the US Bubbling Under Hot 100 Singles chart, as well as the Kid Digital Songs chart. The song attained a Platinum certification from the Recording Industry Association of America (RIAA). It also charted at number 93 on the Canadian Hot 100. "Better When I'm Dancin'" reached number 76 in Australia, achieving a quadruple Platinum certification in the country in 2023. Additionally, it peaked at numbers 99, 29 and 17 on Venezuela's Record Report, Pop General and Top Anglo charts, respectively, and received a Gold certification in Poland.

== Music video ==
Directed by Philip Andelman, the video premiered on Apple Music on October 14, 2015. It features Trainor with appearances from Snoopy, Woodstock, Charlie Brown, among other characters from Peanuts. Several of Trainor's relatives traveled to Los Angeles to appear in the video, including her aunt and uncle, Lisa and Burton Toney, and their three children. Her high school friend Lily Harrington and father Gary Trainor also made cameos, while her mother filmed the making of the video. In the music video, Trainor wears a red, long-sleeved dress and performs choreography at locations such as a diner and a street corner. Her relatives are also featured dancing. The beginning of the video was filmed in black and white, which changes to bright colors during shots of Trainor's family.

Menyes compared the video's transition, from black and white to the "big, colorful comic world" of Peanuts, to Smallville. Writing for Idolator, Mike Wass described it as "a suitably lighthearted affair", commenting that its "retro look" is similar to Trainor's previous music videos, with the singer "rocking vintage fashions and working behind the counter of an old-school diner".

== Live performances ==
Trainor performed "Better When I'm Dancin'" and "Good to be Alive" during selected shows of her MTrain Tour, such as on July 24 in Los Angeles and August 6 in Boston, prior to their release. On November 5, 2015, she played it on Today, and the following day on The Tonight Show Starring Jimmy Fallon. She also performed the song on the Dancing with the Stars season 21 finale on November 24, 2015, followed by her collaboration with Who Is Fancy and Ariana Grande, "Boys like You".

== Track listing ==
- Digital download
1. "Better When I'm Dancin'" – 2:56
- 7" Vinyl
1. "Better When I'm Dancin'" – 2:56
2. "Bang Dem Sticks" – 3:00

== Credits and personnel ==
Credits adapted from Tidal.

- Meghan Trainor – lead vocals, producer, programmer, recording engineer
- Justin Trainor – producer, programmer
- Brandon Brown – bass
- Kendall Gilder – guitar
- Dave Kutch – mastering engineer
- Manny Marroquin – mixing engineer

== Charts ==
Peak chart positions for "Better When I'm Dancin'"
Chart (2015—2025)	Peak position
Australia (ARIA)	76
Canada Hot 100 (Billboard)	93
UK Singles Downloads (Official Charts)	28
US Bubbling Under Hot 100 (Billboard)	1
US Kid Digital Songs (Billboard)	1
Venezuela (Record Report)	99
Venezuela (Pop General)	29
Venezuela (Top Anglo)	17

== Certifications ==
Certifications for "Better When I'm Dancin'"
Region	Certification	Certified units/sales
Australia (ARIA)	4× Platinum	280,000^{‡}
Brazil (Pro-Música Brasil)	Platinum	60,000^{‡}
Canada (Music Canada)	3× Platinum	240,000^{‡}
Denmark (IFPI Danmark)	Gold	45,000^{‡}
New Zealand (RMNZ)	2× Platinum	60,000^{‡}
Poland (ZPAV)	Gold	10,000^{‡}
United Kingdom (BPI)	Platinum	600,000^{‡}
United States (RIAA)	Platinum	1,000,000^{‡}
Streaming
Sweden (GLF)	Gold	4,000,000^{†}
^{‡} Sales+streaming figures based on certification alone.^{†} Streaming-only figures based on certification alone.

== Release history ==
Release dates and format(s) for "Better When I'm Dancin'"
Region	Date	Format	Label	Ref.
Various	October 14, 2015	Digital download; streaming	Epic	
Italy	October 23, 2015	Contemporary hit radio	Epic	
Various	February 26, 2016	7" Vinyl	Epic	
