= Radio Disney Music Award for Best Song That Makes You Smile =

Annual US music award

The following is a list of Radio Disney Music Award winners and nominees for Best Song That Makes You Smile.

== Winners and nominees ==
=== 2010s ===
Year	Winner	Nominees	Ref.
2013	Unrealized		
2014	"Ooh La La" - Britney Spears	"La Da Dee" - Cody Simpson; "The Fox (What Does the Fox Say?)" - Ylvis	
2015	"Sugar" - Maroon 5	"Happy" - Pharrell Williams; "Smile" - R5	
2016	"Better When I'm Dancin'" - Meghan Trainor	"Cheerleader" - OMI; "I Don't Like It, I Love It" - Flo Rida feat. Robin Thicke & Verdine White	
2017	"24K Magic" - Bruno Mars	"Can't Stop the Feeling!" - Justin Timberlake; "HandClap" - Fitz and the Tantrums; "JuJu on That Beat" - Zay Hilfigerrr and Zayion McCall; "Me Too" - Meghan Trainor	
2018	"DNA" - BTS	"I Miss Those Days" - Bleachers; "No Excuses" - Meghan Trainor; "One Foot" - Walk the Moon; "So Much More Than This" - Grace VanderWaal	
