= Nathanael Saleh =

British actor

- Born: Nathanael Isaac E. Saleh; 22 April 2006 (age 19); Redditch, Worcestershire, England
- Occupation: Actor
- Years active: 2016–present

Nathanael Isaac E. Saleh is an English actor best known for playing John Banks in Mary Poppins Returns. He also has a key role in The Letter for the King.

== Early life ==
Saleh started performing when he was three years old, singing songs and giving recitations to family and friends. At five years old he followed his older brother to join Playbox Theatre at the Dream Factory in Warwick, England, gaining his first speaking role just a year later. This was followed over subsequent years by roles in a number of Playbox Theatre productions. At the beginning of 2015 he signed up at The Book, Playbox Theatre's own in-house agency, and almost immediately began receiving calls for auditions. Nathanael has always had an interest in dance, gaining a series of IDTA qualifications in Ballet and in Contemporary Dance. He has also worked on developing his range in acting, specifically in Voice Training, successfully completing LAMDA examinations in "Speaking Verse & Prose" up to Grade 3 at present, all with distinction.

== Career ==
He began acting in television roles. In 2016 he appeared on two episodes of Game of Thrones. In 2018 he made his film debut in the film Mary Poppins Returns, he plays John Banks, Michael's eldest son and Jane's nephew.

Most recently Nathanael has played Azolan in Dangerous Liaisons.

== Filmography ==
=== Film ===
Year	Title	Role	Notes
2018	Mary Poppins Returns	John Banks	Released
2019	Days of the Bagnold Summer	Alex	Released
2020	The Snatcher	Jimmy	Released (Short film)

=== Television ===
Year	Title	Role	Notes
2016	Game of Thrones	Arthur	2 episodes
2019	The Letter for the King	Piak	Main role
2022	The Last Bus	Josh	Main role
2022	Dangerous Liaisons	Azolan	Main role

== Awards and nominations ==
Year	Award	Category	Nominated work	Result	Ref.
2019	Guild of Music Supervisors Awards	Best Song/Recording Created for a Film	Mary Poppins Returns	Nominated	
2019	Palm Springs International Film Festival	Ensemble Cast Award	Mary Poppins Returns	Won	
