= Title (EP) =

EP by Meghan Trainor
- Released: September 9, 2014
- Studio: The Carriage House (Nolensville, Tennessee)
- Genres: Doo-wop; R&B; pop
- Length: 12:45
- Label: Epic
- Producer: Kevin Kadish

Meghan Trainor chronology
| Only 17 (2011) | Title (2014) | Title (2015) |

Singles from Title
- 1. "All About That Bass" Released: June 30, 2014

Title is the debut extended play (EP) by the American singer-songwriter Meghan Trainor. Kevin Kadish produced all of its songs and wrote them with Trainor. The two conceived the EP shortly after Trainor signed with Epic Records in 2014, and recorded it in the Carriage House, based in Nolensville, Tennessee. The label released it on September 9, 2014, and replaced it with a pre-order for Trainor's 2015 debut major-label studio album of the same name the following month. Musically, Title comprises songs inspired by 1950s doo wop that lie between modern R&B and melodic pop. The EP has a lyrical theme of commitment and staying true to oneself, which Trainor hoped would empower women.

The EP includes Trainor's debut single, "All About That Bass", which was released on June 30, 2014, and topped the Billboard Hot 100 in the United States, alongside reaching No. 1 in 57 countries with worldwide sales of 11 million units. The EP also includes the song "Dear Future Husband", which was later released as a single for the Title LP and was modestly successful, peaking at number 14 on the Billboard Hot 100 and charting within the top 10 of charts in 5 other countries. The other two songs from the EP, "Close Your Eyes" and the title track, would later be rereleased on the Title LP, alongside "All About That Bass" and "Dear Future Husband". The title track would later make several charts, including the Billboard Hot 100, despite not being released as a single.

Title garnered mixed reviews from critics, who thought its tracks had potential for commercial success, but considered the lyrics too repetitive and questioned Trainor's musicality. The EP debuted at number 15 on the Billboard 200 and sold 171,000 copies in the United States. It also entered charts in Canada and Denmark. Trainor promoted Title by performing "All About That Bass" on various television shows and its title track at other venues. She included all tracks from the EP on the set lists of her 2015 concert tours That Bass Tour and MTrain Tour.

== Background and development ==
Meghan Trainor developed an early interest in music and started singing at age six. After her father encouraged her to pursue her musical interests, she independently released three albums from material she had written, recorded, performed, and produced, between the ages 15 and 17. These included Trainor's eponymous 2009 release, and her 2010 albums I'll Sing with You and Only 17. She introduced herself to former NRBQ member Al Anderson at a music conference in Nashville. Impressed by Trainor's songwriting, he referred her to his publisher Carla Wallace of music publishing firm Big Yellow Dog Music. Though Trainor had been offered a full scholarship to the Berklee College of Music, she decided to pursue her songwriting career and signed with Big Yellow Dog in 2012.

American songwriter Kevin Kadish met Trainor in June 2013 at Wallace's request. He liked Trainor's voice and felt a strong songwriting affinity with her due to their mutual love of pop music from the 1950s and 1960s. Disenchanted with the electronic dance music that populated Top 40 radio, he had wished to create a "'50s-sounding record of doo-wop-inspired pop" for three years, but could not find any artist that shared his interest. Trainor, who had been introduced to doo-wop by her father at a young age, found it to be "the catchiest stuff" and wanted to create something reminiscent of The Chordettes's 1958 single "Lollipop". Kadish shared his idea with Trainor after the two bonded over Jimmy Soul's 1963 song "If You Wanna Be Happy", and they decided to create an extended play (EP) with the same sound, "just for fun". They completed three songs before Kadish started producing a rock album for the rest of the year. Trainor moved to Nashville in November 2013 and they co-wrote the song "All About That Bass", pitching it to different record labels, all of which rejected it due to its doo-wop pop sound as synth-pop was more popular at the time.

L.A. Reid, the chairman of Epic Records, heard the song and encouraged Trainor to record it herself. She signed with the label in 2014 and immediately began working on more songs with Kadish as Epic wanted her to record an entire album. The label briefly suggested that Trainor work with other producers, such as Pharrell Williams or Timbaland, but she insisted on continuing with Kadish: "Kevin's my guy". Epic Records's artists and repertoire division called Kadish and said, "whatever you did on 'Bass,' do it 10 more times. Don't bring in any more writers. Don't bring in any other producers. Whoever you used on that song." Upon its release as Trainor's debut single on June 30, 2014, "All About That Bass" reached number one in 58 countries and sold 11 million units worldwide. Some critics considered it a novelty song, and questioned if Trainor would be able to release a successful follow-up or end up a one-hit wonder.

== Composition ==
=== Music ===
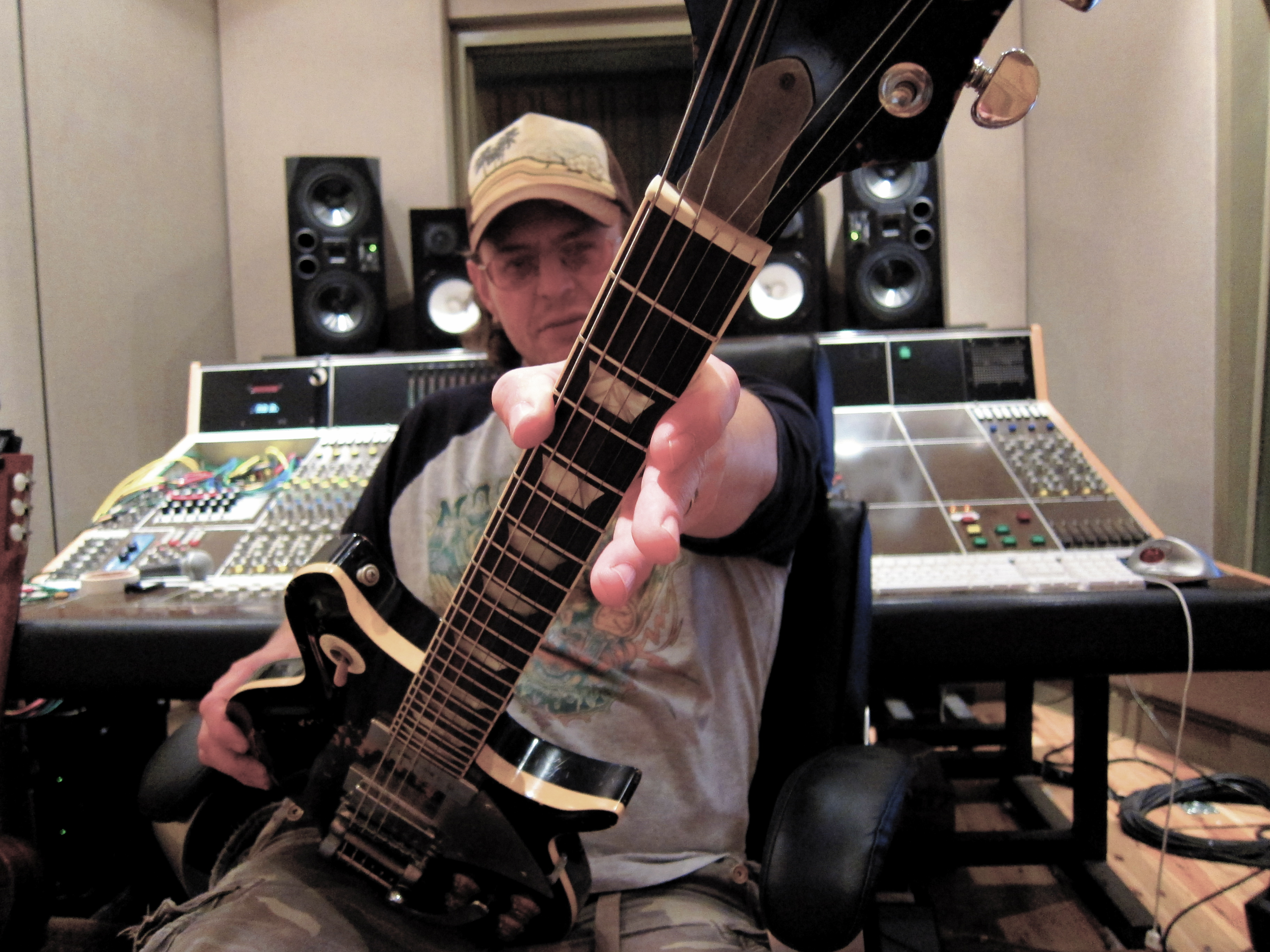
Kevin Kadish co-wrote and produced all songs on Title.

Title comprises songs inspired by 1950s doo-wop music that "straddle the line between modern R&B and melodic pop", according to AllMusic's Matt Collar. Jon Dolan of Rolling Stone stated that the EP combines "trickle-down Beyoncé empowerment themes" and "sugary doo-wop and girl-group melodies". Kadish produced, recorded, engineered, and mixed the entire EP at the Carriage House studio in Nolensville, Tennessee. He plays the drums, acoustic guitar, electric guitar, and bass; Trainor handled drum programming and clapping, and plays percussion and ukulele. David Baron plays the piano, baritone saxophone, and hammond organ; and Jim Hoke plays the baritone and tenor saxophone. Dave Kutch mastered Title at The Mastering Palace in New York City.

The opening track, "All About That Bass", is a bubblegum pop, doo-wop, hip hop, Italo-Latin soul, and retro-R&B pop song, influenced by 1960s genres—soul-pop, groove, Motown bounce, and girl-group pop. The song includes syncopated handclaps, bass instrumentation, and, according to Slate's Chris Molanphy, "a scatting tempo and shimmying melody". The title track is a doo-wop song with Caribbean music influences and a ska-inflected bridge, which blends the horn and ukulele folk-pop with island percussion instrumentation and a programmed beat, and also incorporates handclaps and modern sound effects. Trainor projects an assertive and retro aural tone according to Knoxville News Sentinel, and delivers a rap verse. She felt it showcased "what [her] sound really is", and considered its Caribbean drum and rapping new territory for her. "Dear Future Husband" is a doo-wop, pop, and girl-group bounce song, with influences of jazz. It opens with a stylus sound on a damaged vinyl and transitions into retro ukulele instrumentation, further incorporating brisk piano, buoyant brass, and a drum track. The final track, "Close Your Eyes", is a contemporary ballad on which Trainor gives a soulful and "nuanced, fluttery vocal performance" over an acoustic guitar and pitch-shifted background vocals.

=== Lyrics ===
For Title, Trainor wrote lyrics about things she thought many people ignore, such as "commitment and staying true to one's self". She wanted to speak from the place of "an awkward 19-, 20-year-old, when you're pretty sure you're an adult but you're not, yet," and identified the EP's material as "too young for Kesha" and too mature for Disney. It comprises "very personal, girl power anthems" that Trainor wishes existed when she attended high school: "Like, love yourself more, respect yourself more [...] There are girl empowerment songs—like 'I love myself I'm beautiful'—but there are also 'I deserve a good man, I deserve a good boyfriend, man, you should take me out.'"

Trainor and Kadish grew up as "chubby" kids, and wrote the lyrics of "All About That Bass" as a call to embrace inner beauty, and promote positive body image and self-acceptance. She calls out the fashion industry for creating unreachable beauty standards and criticizes the use of Photoshop in magazines. It includes the line "I'm bringing booty back", as a reference to Justin Timberlake's single "SexyBack" (2006). Trainor, who was ill-treated by unemployed men she dated in the past, wrote the title track and "Dear Future Husband" to correct issues with contemporary dating and hookup culture, like women basing their self worth on social media likes and whether their partner replied to their texts. On the title track, she refuses to be friends with benefits and pushes her partner to define their relationship more clearly. "Dear Future Husband" is about chivalry and dating, and lists the things a man needs to do to be Trainor's life partner, and win her adoration and dedication. These include "treat[ing her] like a lady" even when she behaves insanely, calling her pretty every night, and putting her family above his. "Close Your Eyes" encourages listeners to embrace what makes them different and show their authentic personality to the world.

== Release and promotion ==
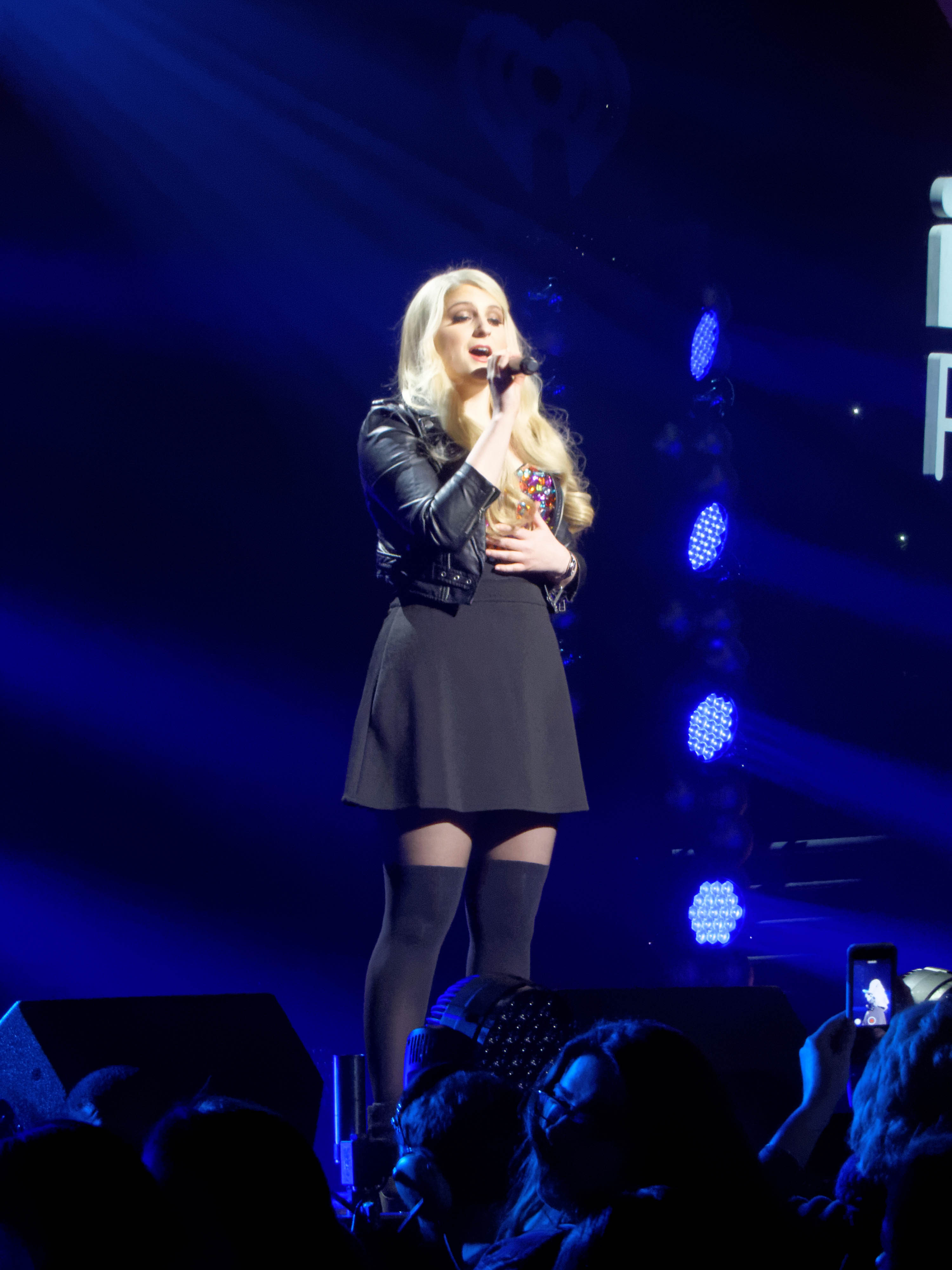
Trainor performing "Close Your Eyes" during the Jingle Ball Tour on December 10, 2014

MTV News premiered the title track on September 5, 2014. Epic Records released the EP through compact disc (CD) and digital download formats four days later. The label released the CD in Australia on September 12. It debuted at number 15 on the Billboard 200 chart dated September 27, with first-week sales of 21,000 copies, and sold over 171,000 copies in the United States. Title peaked at number 17 on the Canadian Albums Chart and number 35 on the Danish Albums Chart. By the end of 2014, the EP was positioned at number 173 on the Billboard 200, and by the end of 2015, the EP was positioned at number 169 on the same chart. The digital release of "All About That Bass" in some European countries shared an identical track list. A pre-order of Trainor's 2015 debut major-label studio album of the same name, which included all tracks from the EP, replaced it later that month.

"All About That Bass" served as the lead single from Title. It spent eight consecutive weeks at number one on the US Billboard Hot 100, the longest run for any Epic Records artist in the chart's history, and was the best-selling song by a female artist in the 2010s, with 5.8 million digital downloads. The lyrics caused controversy; some critics called the song anti-feminist and accused Trainor of shaming thin women. It was nominated for Record of the Year and Song of the Year at the 57th Annual Grammy Awards. "Dear Future Husband" and the title track were both considered options for release as Trainor's second single. Reid scrapped them in favor of "Lips Are Movin" (2014), which he thought "will do better". "Dear Future Husband" was eventually chosen as the third single from the album in 2015, and peaked at number 14 on the Billboard Hot 100. (Note: "Lips Are Movin" and "Dear Future Husband" were promoted as singles from the album.) The title track attained viral popularity on video-sharing service TikTok in 2021.

Trainor promoted Title by performing its songs on various television shows and her concert tours. She sang "All About That Bass" at an Emily West concert, Live! with Kelly and Michael, for Entertainment Tonight, The Tonight Show Starring Jimmy Fallon, The X Factor (Australia), and 2Day FM. (Note: Performances after Title was replaced are not included.) She reprised the title track in sessions for MTV and the National Post, and as a mashup with "All About That Bass" at the 2014 iHeartRadio Music Festival. Trainor included all tracks from the EP on her set list for the Jingle Ball Tour 2014, and her 2015 concert tours That Bass Tour and MTrain Tour.

== Critical reception ==
Professional ratings
Review scores
| Source | Rating |
|---|---|
| AllMusic | 4/5 stars |
| Knoxville News Sentinel | 3/5 stars |
| Rolling Stone | 3/5 stars |

Title received mixed reviews from music critics. Collar rated the EP four stars out of five, and Knoxville News Sentinel and Dolan rated it three. Collar praised Trainor's vocals as "soulful, highly resonant," and catchy; he considered "Dear Future Husband" and "All About That Bass" irresistible. Others criticized the lyrical themes as repetitive on Title despite its short duration. Knoxville News Sentinel thought she showed crisp artistic vision on the EP but dubbed its tracks "sort-of sequels" of her debut single. The newspaper said it proved Trainor was a "one-trick pony" and left much to the imagination about what else she is capable of doing. Chris DeVille of Stereogum thought she could only outlast the success of "All About That Bass" if she found new topics to write about, and was disappointed that the lyrics of "Dear Future Husband" and the title track were interchangeable. He maintained that any tracks on Title could achieve chart success with ample promotion.

== Track listing ==
Kadish produced all songs and wrote them with Trainor.

Title track listing
| No. | Title | Length |
|---|---|---|
| 1. | "All About That Bass" | 3:07 |
| 2. | "Title" | 2:54 |
| 3. | "Dear Future Husband" | 3:04 |
| 4. | "Close Your Eyes" | 3:40 |
| Total length: | | 12:45 |

== Credits and personnel ==
Credits are adapted from the EP's liner notes.

=== Recording locations ===
- Recorded, engineered, and mixed at The Carriage House, Nolensville, Tennessee
- Mastered at The Mastering Palace, New York City

=== Personnel ===
- Meghan Trainor – songwriter, executive producer, clapping, percussion, ukulele, drum programming
- Kevin Kadish – songwriter, producer, drum programming, acoustic guitar, electric guitar, hammond organ, vox organ, piano, bass, sound design, mixing, recording, engineering, synthesizer, background vocals, executive producer
- David Baron – piano, baritone saxophone, hammond organ
- Jim Hoke – baritone saxophone, tenor saxophone (track 3)
- Jeremy Lister – background vocals (track 4)
- Dave Kutch – mastering
- Fatima Robinson – art direction, art design
- JP Robinson – art direction, art design
- Sarah McColgan – photography

== Charts ==
=== Weekly charts ===
Weekly chart positions for Title
| Chart (2014) | Peak position |
|---|---|
| Canadian Albums (Billboard) | 17 |
| Danish Albums (Hitlisten) | 35 |
| US Billboard 200 | 15 |

=== Year-end charts ===
Year-end chart positions for Title
| Chart (2014) | Position |
|---|---|
| US Billboard 200 | 173 |
| Chart (2015) | Position |
| US Billboard 200 | 169 |

== Release history ==
Release dates and format(s) for Title
| Country | Date | Format | Label | Ref. |
|---|---|---|---|---|
| United States | September 9, 2014 | CD; digital download | Epic | |
| Australia | September 9, 2014 | Digital download | Epic | |
| Ireland | September 9, 2014 | Digital download | Epic | |
| Germany | September 9, 2014 | CD | Epic | |
| Australia | September 12, 2014 | CD | Epic | |
