= Like I'm Gonna Lose You =

2015 single by Meghan Trainor featuring John Legend

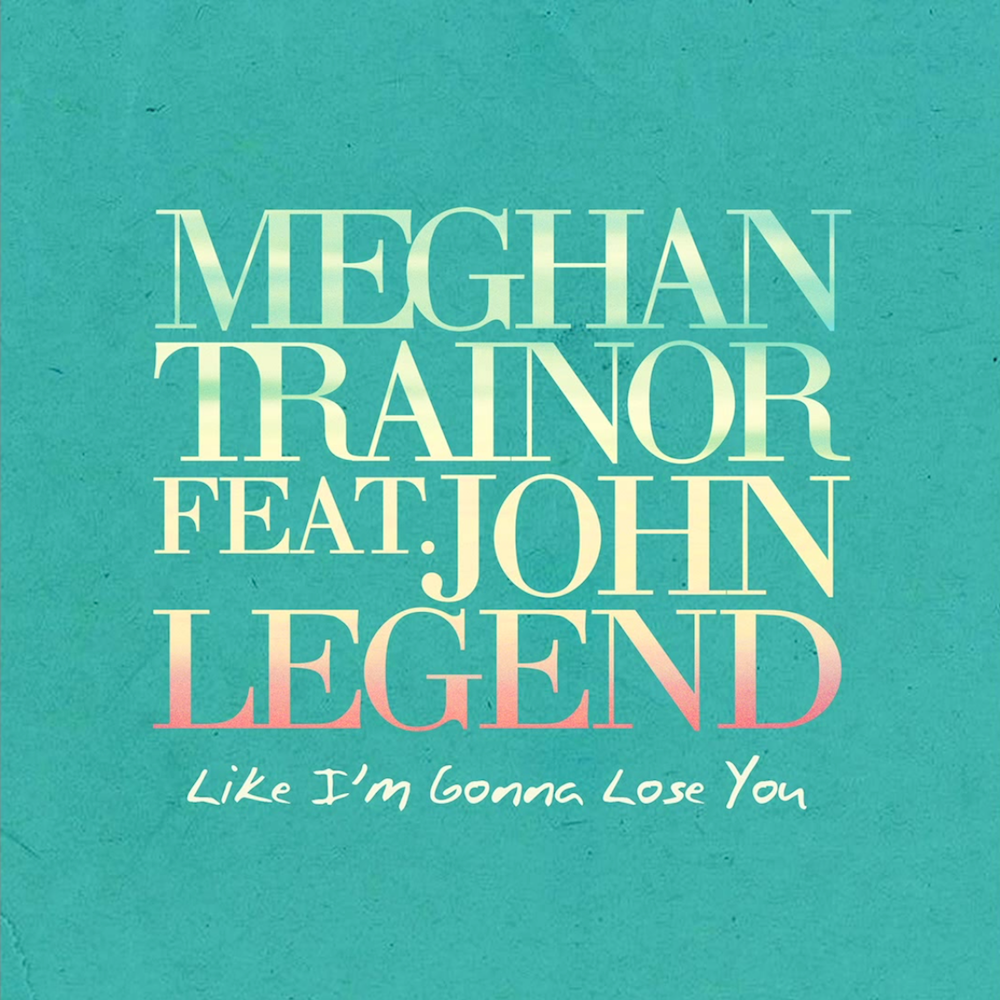

Single by Meghan Trainor featuring John Legend

from the album Title
- Released: June 23, 2015
- Studio: The Green Room (East Nashville, Tennessee); Germano Studios (New York City)
- Genre: Soul
- Length: 3:45
- Label: Epic
- Songwriters: Meghan Trainor; Justin Weaver; Caitlyn Smith
- Producers: Chris Gelbuda; Meghan Trainor

Meghan Trainor singles chronology
"Dear Future Husband" (2015)	"Like I'm Gonna Lose You" (2015)	"Boys Like You" (2015)

John Legend singles chronology
"One Man Can Change the World" (2015)	"Like I'm Gonna Lose You" (2015)	"Listen" (2016)

Music video
- "Like I'm Gonna Lose You" on YouTube

"Like I'm Gonna Lose You" is a song by the American singer-songwriter Meghan Trainor from her debut major-label studio album Title (2015), featuring guest vocals from John Legend. Trainor wrote the song with Justin Weaver and Caitlyn Smith, and produced it with Chris Gelbuda. Epic Records released it as the album's fourth single on June 23, 2015. A soul love ballad, "Like I'm Gonna Lose You" is about savoring moments spent with loved ones and not taking them for granted.

Critics praised Trainor's vocals and the song's composition, but some thought its mellow style did not suit her. In the United States, "Like I'm Gonna Lose You" reached number eight on the Billboard Hot 100 and was certified 4× Platinum by the Recording Industry Association of America. It peaked at number one in Australia, New Zealand, and Poland, in the top ten in Canada and South Africa, and attained an 8× Platinum certification in Australia.

Constellation Jones directed the music video for "Like I'm Gonna Lose You", featuring Trainor singing in a candlelit room on a rainy night while people engaged in a diverse variety of relationships are shown interacting with their loved ones. Trainor performed the song on television shows such as the Billboard Music Awards, Jimmy Kimmel Live!, and the American Music Awards, and included it on the set lists of her concert tours That Bass Tour (2015), MTrain Tour (2015), the Untouchable Tour (2016), and the Timeless Tour (2024).

== Background ==
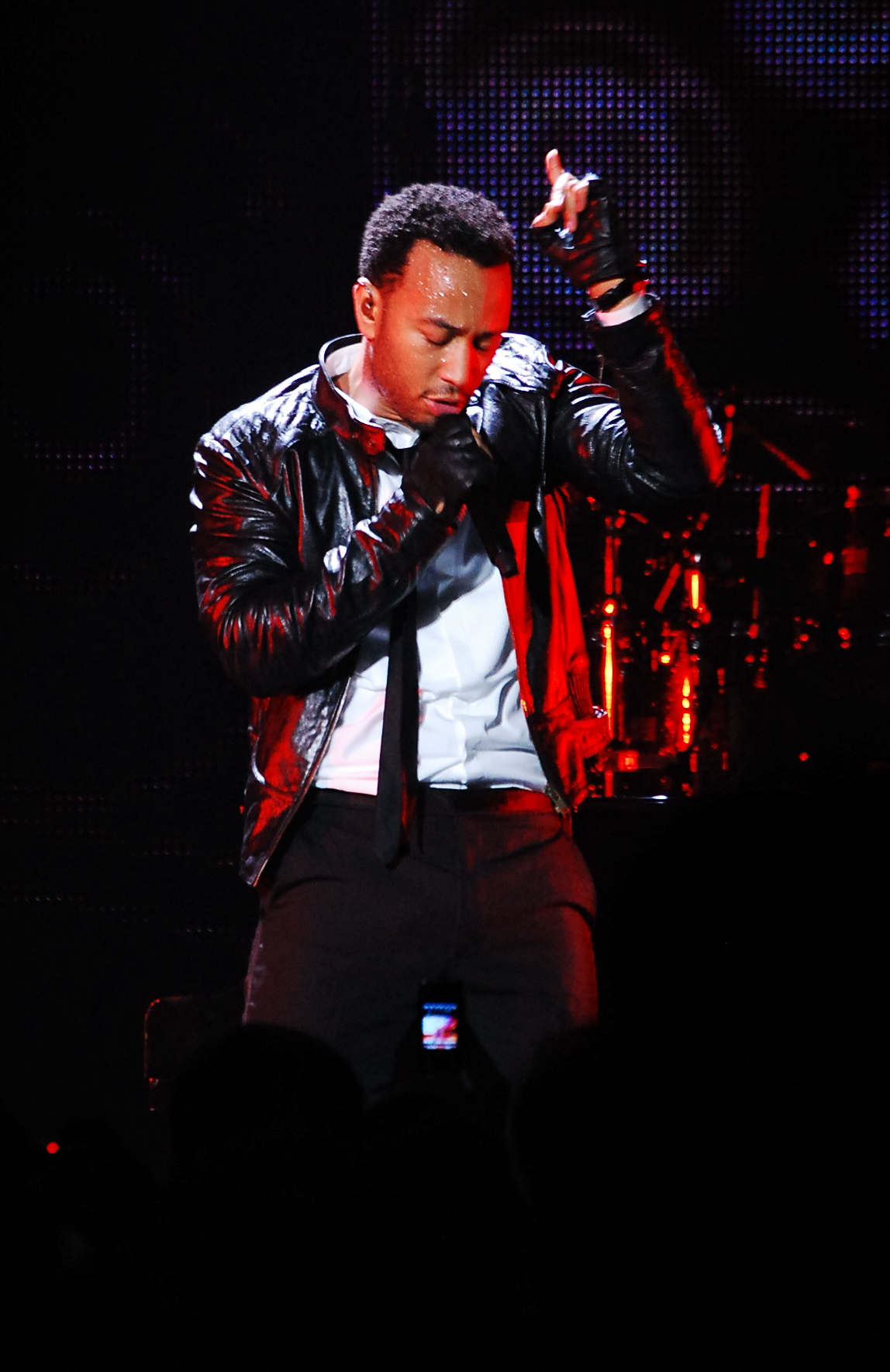
The song features guest vocals by American singer John Legend (pictured in 2008).

After independently releasing three albums herself between 2009 and 2010, Meghan Trainor started writing songs for other singers. In 2012, she signed a publishing deal with Big Yellow Dog Music, a Nashville, Tennessee-based music publishing firm, and moved to Nashville the following November. While working in Music Row, Trainor met fellow songwriters Justin Weaver and Caitlyn Smith, and wrote "Like I'm Gonna Lose You" with them, intending to pitch it to Kelly Clarkson. She signed with Epic Records in 2014 after L.A. Reid, the label's chairman, convinced her to become a recording artist. Epic wanted Trainor to record an entire album and asked her to begin working on songs for it. She released the doo-wop song "All About That Bass" as her debut single, which reached number one in 58 countries and sold 11 million units worldwide. "Lips Are Movin" (2014) and "Dear Future Husband" (2015) served as the follow-up singles, which were sonically similar and reached the top 15 on the US Billboard Hot 100.

Trainor initially decided not to include "Like I'm Gonna Lose You" on her debut major-label studio album, Title (2015), because it did not keep with the album's doo-wop sound. After her uncle, Burton Toney, forced her manager to listen to it, the latter was reduced to tears and convinced her to put it on the track list. Trainor's management, which also represents John Legend, sent "Like I'm Gonna Lose You" to him. He said "I love this. I want to be a part of it". Trainor produced the song with Chris Gelbuda, with whom she had co-written the song "3am" and Sabrina Carpenter's 2014 single "Can't Blame a Girl for Trying". It was released as the sixth track on Title on January 9, 2015, featuring guest vocals from Legend. Epic Records promoted "Like I'm Gonna Lose You" to contemporary hit radio stations in the United States on June 23, 2015, as the fourth single from the album. The label sent the song to rhythmic contemporary radio stations in the country on October 6, 2015, and radio airplay in Italy on October 30.

== Composition and lyrical interpretation ==
"Like I'm Gonna Lose You" has a duration of three minutes and forty-five seconds. Trainor and Gelbuda programmed the song; he recorded her vocals at The Green Room in East Nashville, Tennessee, and Jason Agel recorded Legend's vocals at Germano Studios in New York City. Manny Marroquin mixed it at Larabee North Studios in Universal City, California, and Dave Kutch mastered it at The Mastering Palace in New York City.

"Like I'm Gonna Lose You" (2015)
A 22-second sample of "Like I'm Gonna Lose You", a soul ballad, in which Trainor delivers soprano vocals with a twang

Trainor delivers her soprano vocals with a twang on "Like I'm Gonna Lose You", which is a soul ballad. Unlike other songs on Title, it features minimal instrumental accompaniment and places emphasis on Trainor's vocals; the Associated Press's Melanie J. Sims noted that in a rare moment for Trainor, it does not employ "a catchy hook or quirky production". Ian Gittins of Virgin Media described "Like I'm Gonna Lose You" as a "classic Motown-style ballad", and Chuck Arnold of Rolling Stone likened Trainor and Legend's chemistry on the "finger-snapping ballad" to that between Marvin Gaye and Tammi Terrell.

"Like I'm Gonna Lose You" is a love song with lyrics about fatalism. Trainor stated she wrote it after having one of "those nightmares that your brother or sister or boyfriend just dies", after which, one is relieved to find them still alive: "It's like I'm going to love you like I'm going to lose you because I know what it feels like from that dream and I'm not going to let it happen". In the lyrics of "Like I'm Gonna Lose You", she parlays her fear of losing a loved one into determination to relish and savor every moment spent with them. Trainor sings about how "tomorrow" is not assured, promising someone that she "won't take [them] for granted". In his verse, Legend sings about how one could lose everything "in the blink of an eye" and promises to kiss his partner longer and tell her everything he wants to say, while delivering a "silky voice and presence".

== Critical reception ==
Music critics including Gittins and Newsday's Glenn Gamboa thought "Like I'm Gonna Lose You" sounded like a "classic"; the latter commented that it will serve Trainor throughout her career. Writing for MTV News, Loren Diblasi called the song a "moving collaboration", and Madeline Roth considered it among the standout tracks on Title. Elysa Gardener of USA Today deemed it proof that Trainor was most appealing when she was not cunning and agitational. The Daily Telegraph's Helen Brown opined that "Like I'm Gonna Lose You" is a formulaic ballad, but complimented Legend's sincerity of tone. Jeff Benjamin of Fuse considered Trainor and Legend an unlikely pairing to perform a love duet but was impressed by the end result.

Some critics like Gittins and Sims praised Trainor's vocal prowess on "Like I'm Gonna Lose You"; others thought its subdued style did not suit her. Sims felt that the song was the "most refreshing" on the album, and found its focus on her voice a welcome change from the production-heavy nature of other tracks. Gardener called Trainor's vocals a flawless accompaniment for Legend's; Billboard's Carl Wilson thought Trainor was static without the deeper quality added by Legend's vocals. Writing for New York Daily News, Jim Farber thought the seriousness of "Like I'm Gonna Lose You" did not befit Trainor, noting that it only flattered Legend. Marc Hirsh of The Boston Globe wrote that Trainor struggled when attempting to stray from her usual pastiche music, and failed to project personality on the song while Legend "[came] through loud and clear".

== Commercial performance ==
"Like I'm Gonna Lose You" debuted at number 95 on the US Billboard Hot 100 issued for July 25, 2015. On November 21, 2015, the song ascended into the top 10, becoming Trainor's third and Legend's second to achieve the milestone. With this, she became the first female artist since Kesha in 2010 to attain at least three top-10 singles on the chart from a debut album. It peaked at number eight on the Billboard Hot 100 issued for December 12, 2015, and received a 4× Platinum certification from the Recording Industry Association of America. On the Canadian Hot 100, "Like I'm Gonna Lose You" charted at number eight and Music Canada certified it 7× Platinum. The song reached number 99 in the United Kingdom and earned a Platinum certification from the British Phonographic Industry.

"Like I'm Gonna Lose You" was commercially successful in Oceania. In Australia, the song spent four consecutive weeks at number one, becoming both Trainor and Legend's second to reach the summit. The Australian Recording Industry Association certified it 8× Platinum in 2023. "Like I'm Gonna Lose You" peaked atop the New Zealand chart for three consecutive weeks, giving Trainor her third and Legend his first chart-topper. The song received a 6× Platinum certification from Recorded Music NZ. It charted within the top 40 of national record charts, at number one in Poland, number six in South Africa, number 24 in the Czech Republic, number 34 in the Netherlands, number 36 in Belgium, number 37 in Portugal, number 38 in Slovakia, and number 39 in Slovenia. "Like I'm Gonna Lose You" earned a 2× Platinum+Gold certification in Mexico, 2× Platinum in Poland, Platinum in Denmark, Sweden, and Gold in Italy.

== Music video ==
Constellation Jones directed the music video for "Like I'm Gonna Lose You", which premiered on Vevo and was simultaneously promoted through a billboard in Times Square on July 9, 2015. In it, Trainor performs the song in a candlelit room on a rainy night while people engaged in a variety of relationships are shown interacting with their loved ones: a mother and daughter, grandmother and granddaughter, heterosexual, homosexual and interracial romantic couples, and friends. Trainor and Legend sing to each other through the opposite sides of a misty window. The video concludes with the couples smiling and the singers joining hands, as the rain comes to a halt and the sun rises. Jackie Frere of Billboard and The Hollywood Reporter interpreted the final scene as a victory of love. In a behind-the-scenes video released on July 21, Trainor described its message as "loving someone as if you're gonna lose them", and noted that its emotional nature represented a change of pace from the "bubblegum 'pop star'" role she was used to portraying. Critics praised the video's heartwarming character; Benjamin opined that its depiction of different "people, races and sexualities" would help "Like I'm Gonna Lose You" connect with varied audiences.

== Live performances ==
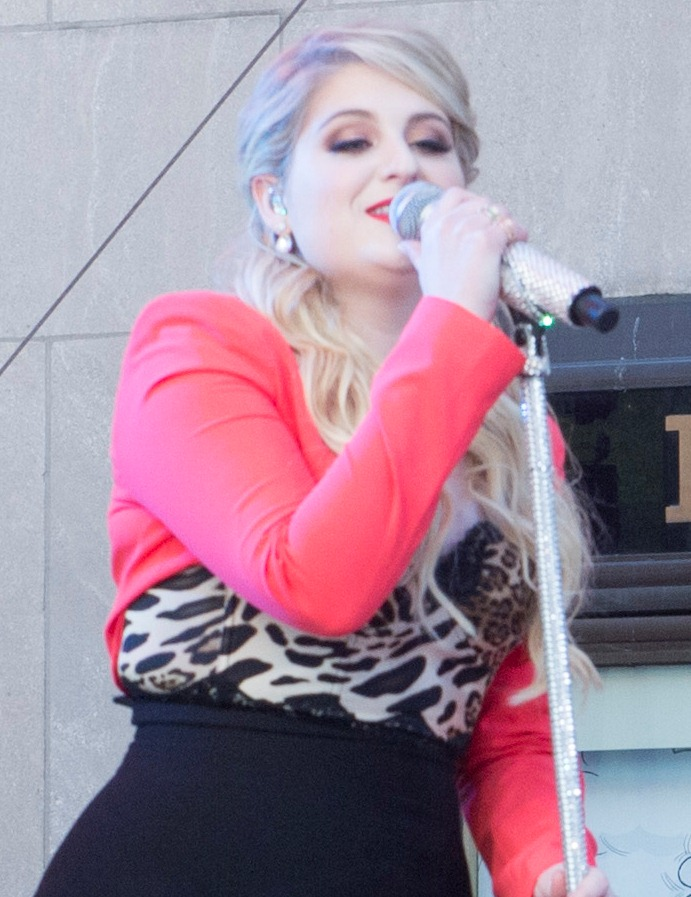
Trainor performing "Like I'm Gonna Lose You" on The Today Show in May 2015

Trainor included "Like I'm Gonna Lose You" on the set list for her That Bass Tour (2015). She dueted with American singer Matt Prince during the show in New York City, George Sheppard in Boston, and Nathan Sykes in Birmingham. Trainor first performed the song live with Legend at the Billboard Music Awards on May 17, 2015. A backing band supported her as she began the rendition in a lengthy and shiny gown, which concluded with Legend in a black suit playfully dancing with her. Billboard's Joe Lynch listed it as the seventh best performance of the show, describing the "stellar" rendition as among the night's silent wins: "Not a show-stopper, but a performance that stuck with you". According to Keith Caulfield of the same magazine, it boosted the sales of Title by 60% over the previous week. They sang "Like I'm Gonna Lose You" on The Tonight Show Starring Jimmy Fallon five days later. Trainor reprised the song for The Today Show on May 22, in a set that also featured "All About That Bass", "Dear Future Husband", and "Lips Are Movin".

Trainor and Legend performed an a cappella rendition of "Like I'm Gonna Lose You" for Pop TV's "Massive Musical Mash-Up", which Entertainment Weekly published on May 27. On July 23, 2015, Trainor sang the song on Jimmy Kimmel Live!; she did not struggle and was steady while singing its towering notes according to Entertainment Weekly's Jessica Goodman, which led Billboard to comment that she displayed no ill-effects from her vocal cord hemorrhage the previous month. She reprised it with Legend on The Ellen DeGeneres Show on October 14, 2015. Trainor performed "Like I'm Gonna Lose You" at the American Music Awards on November 22, 2015, in a medley with "Marvin Gaye" (2015), accompanied by Charlie Puth for the latter. American girl group Fifth Harmony sang an acoustic guitar-driven cover of the song at the 2016 Billboard Women in Music ceremony, which Trainor could not attend due to being put on vocal rest. Trainor included it on the set list for her MTrain Tour (2015) and The Untouchable Tour (2016). During one of the dates on the latter, James Corden dueted with Trainor on "Like I'm Gonna Lose You"; writing for Entertainment Weekly, Derek Lawrence praised Corden's performance and noted he "didn't miss a beat". They reprised the song when Trainor recorded her Carpool Karaoke segment for The Late Late Show with James Corden in January 2020. Trainor included it on the set list of her 2024 concert tour, the Timeless Tour.

== Credits and personnel ==
Credits and personnel are adapted from the liner notes of Title.

=== Management ===
- Recorded at The Green Room, East Nashville, Tennessee and Germano Studios, New York City
- Mixed at Larabee North Studios, Universal City, California
- Mastered at The Mastering Palace, New York City
- Published by Year of the Dog Music (ASCAP), a division of Big Yellow Dog LLC. / WB Music Corp./Music of the Corn (ASCAP) / Cornman Music Publishing
- John Legend appears courtesy of Getting Out Our Dreams/Columbia Records, a division of Sony Music Entertainment

=== Personnel ===
- Meghan Trainor – songwriter, producer, programming
- Chris Gelbuda – producer, programming, recording
- Justin Weaver – songwriter
- Caitlyn Smith – songwriter
- Jason Agel – recording
- Manny Marroquin – mixing
- Dave Kutch – mastering

== Charts ==
=== Weekly charts ===
Weekly chart positions for "Like I'm Gonna Lose You"
Chart (2015–2016)	Peak position
Australia (ARIA)	1
Belgium (Ultratip Bubbling Under Wallonia)	36
Canada Hot 100 (Billboard)	8
Canada AC (Billboard)	1
Canada Hot AC (Billboard)	1
Czech Republic Airplay (ČNS IFPI)	50
Czech Republic Singles Digital (ČNS IFPI)	24
Hungary (Stream Top 40)	38
Ireland (IRMA)	96
Mexico Anglo (Monitor Latino)	14
Netherlands (Dutch Top 40)	34
Netherlands (Single Top 100)	38
New Zealand (Recorded Music NZ)	1
Poland (Polish Airplay Top 100)	1
Portugal (AFP)	37
Scottish Singles Sales (Official Charts)	67
Slovakia Airplay (ČNS IFPI)	38
Slovakia Singles Digital (ČNS IFPI)	26
Slovenia (SloTop50)	39
South Africa (EMA)	6
Spain (Promusicae)	99
Sweden (Sverigetopplistan)	67
Switzerland (Schweizer Hitparade)	69
UK Singles (Official Charts)	99
US Billboard Hot 100	8
US Adult Contemporary (Billboard)	2
US Adult Pop Airplay (Billboard)	1
US Dance Airplay (Billboard)	21
US Pop Airplay (Billboard)	5
US Rhythmic Airplay (Billboard)	29

=== Year-end charts ===
2015 year-end chart positions for "Like I'm Gonna Lose You"
Chart (2015)	Position
Australia (ARIA)	23
New Zealand (Recorded Music NZ)	16
US Billboard Hot 100	76
US Adult Contemporary (Billboard)	28
US Adult Top 40 (Billboard)	29

2016 year-end chart positions for "Like I'm Gonna Lose You"
Chart (2016)	Position
Canada (Canadian Hot 100)	47
US Billboard Hot 100	42
US Adult Contemporary (Billboard)	7
US Adult Top 40 (Billboard)	22
US Mainstream Top 40 (Billboard)	41

== Certifications ==
Certifications for "Like I'm Gonna Lose You"
Region	Certification	Certified units/sales
Australia (ARIA)	8× Platinum	560,000^{‡}
Brazil (Pro-Música Brasil)	Diamond	250,000^{‡}
Canada (Music Canada)	7× Platinum	560,000^{‡}
Denmark (IFPI Danmark)	Platinum	90,000^{‡}
Italy (FIMI)	Gold	25,000^{‡}
Mexico (AMPROFON)	4× Platinum+Gold	270,000^{‡}
New Zealand (RMNZ)	6× Platinum	180,000^{‡}
Poland (ZPAV)	2× Platinum	40,000^{‡}
Spain (Promusicae)	Gold	30,000^{‡}
Sweden (GLF)	Platinum	40,000^{‡}
United Kingdom (BPI)	Platinum	600,000^{‡}
United States (RIAA)	4× Platinum	4,000,000^{‡}
^{‡} Sales+streaming figures based on certification alone.

== Release history ==
Release dates and format(s) for "Like I'm Gonna Lose You"
Country	Date	Format	Label	Ref.
United States	June 23, 2015	Contemporary hit radio	Epic	
United States	October 6, 2015	Rhythmic contemporary	Epic	
Italy	October 30, 2015	Radio airplay	Epic	

== See also ==
- List of Billboard Hot 100 top-ten singles in 2015
- List of Billboard Adult Top 40 number-one songs of the 2010s
- List of number-one singles of 2015 (Australia)
- List of number-one singles from the 2010s (New Zealand)
- List of number-one singles of 2016 (Poland)
