= Dear Future Husband =

2015 single by Meghan Trainor

Single by Meghan Trainor

from the album Title
- Released: March 17, 2015
- Studio: The Carriage House (Nolensville, Tennessee)
- Genre: Doo-wop; pop
- Length: 3:04
- Label: Epic
- Songwriters: Meghan Trainor; Kevin Kadish
- Producer: Kevin Kadish

Meghan Trainor singles chronology
"Marvin Gaye" (2015)	"Dear Future Husband" (2015)	"Like I'm Gonna Lose You" (2015)

Music video
- "Dear Future Husband" on YouTube

"Dear Future Husband" is a song by the American singer-songwriter Meghan Trainor. It was included on her EP, Title (2014), and later on her studio album of the same name, released on January 9, 2015. Trainor wrote the song with producer, Kevin Kadish. Epic Records released "Dear Future Husband" as the album's third single on March 17, 2015. A doo-wop and pop song, it has lyrics about chivalry and dating. In the song, Trainor lists things a potential romantic suitor needs to do to win her affection.

Some music critics praised the playful nature of "Dear Future Husband" and compared its lyrics to different Trainor songs, while others were negative about the portrayal of gender roles in its lyrics. In the United States, the song reached number 14 on the Billboard Hot 100 and was certified 3× Platinum by the Recording Industry Association of America. It reached the top 10 in Australia, the Netherlands, Poland, South Africa, and Venezuela and received multi-platinum certifications in Australia and Canada.

Fatima Robinson directed the music video for "Dear Future Husband", which depicts Trainor baking pies in the kitchen and scrubbing floors while various men audition to be her partner. It garnered controversy and online criticism over allegations of antifeminism and sexism. Trainor performed the song on television shows such as the iHeartRadio Music Awards, The Voice, and Today and included it on the set lists of her concert tours That Bass Tour (2015), MTrain Tour (2015), the Untouchable Tour (2016), and the Timeless Tour (2024).

== Background ==
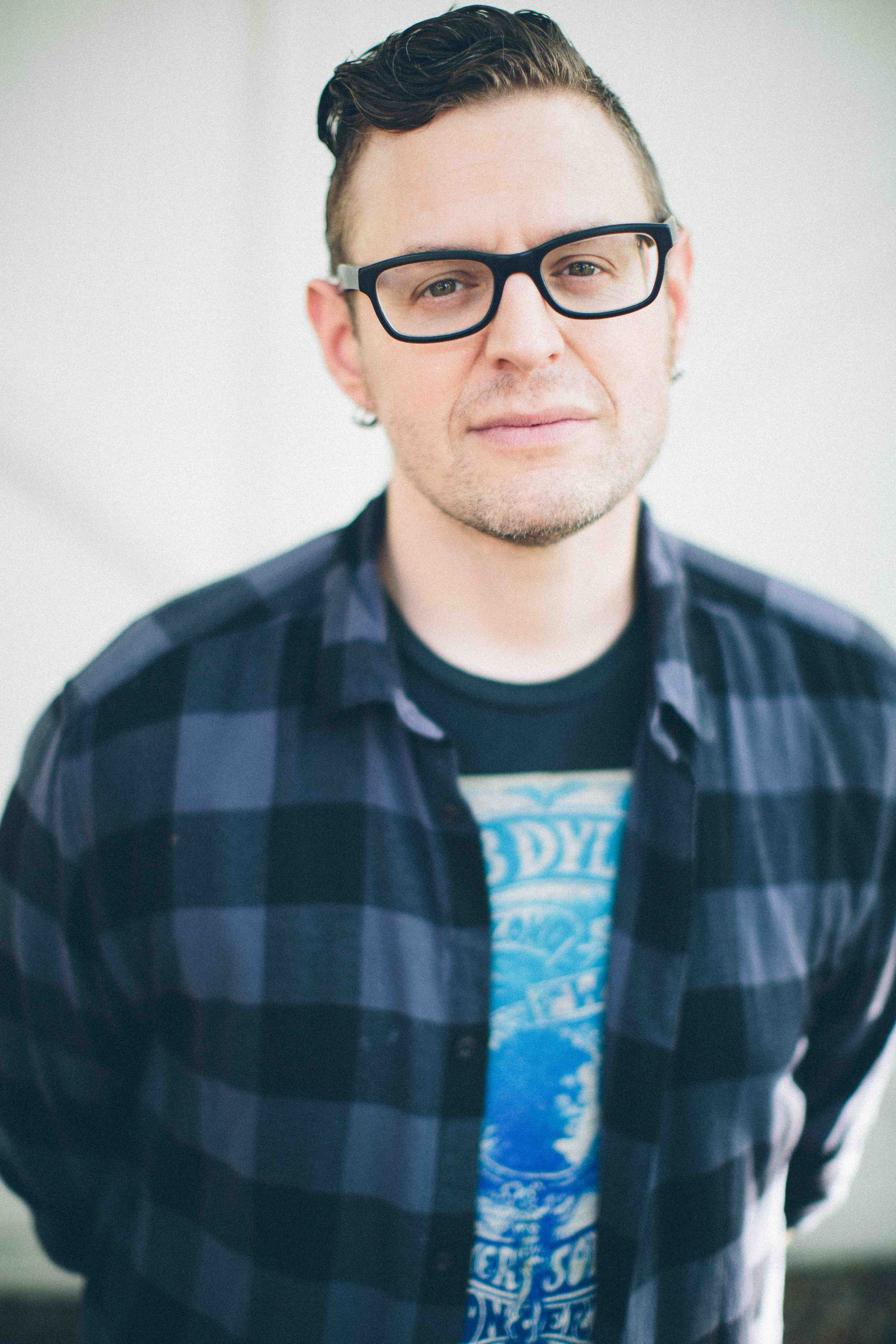
Kevin Kadish produced and co-wrote "Dear Future Husband".

American songwriter Kevin Kadish met Meghan Trainor in June 2013 at the request of Carla Wallace, the co-owner of Trainor's publishing firm Big Yellow Dog Music. Kadish liked Trainor's voice and felt a strong song-writing affinity with her due to their mutual love of pop music from the 1950s and 1960s. They wrote the song "All About That Bass", which led to Trainor signing with Epic Records after she performed it for the label's chairman, L.A. Reid. Kadish and Trainor began working on more songs immediately as the label wanted her to record an entire album. Upon its release as Trainor's debut single in June 2014, the song reached number one in 58 countries and sold 11 million units worldwide. Trainor followed it up with "Lips Are Movin", which reached number four on the US Billboard Hot 100.

Kadish and Trainor wrote "Dear Future Husband" as the third track for Trainor's debut extended play, the 1950s-influenced Title, which they created "just for fun". Trainor was inspired by old-school doo-wop standards like Dion's "Runaround Sue" (1961), and Beach Boys songs that possessed "big choruses that weren't like, melodically up very high" so every listener could chant along to them. She recounted being ill-treated by her romantic partners in high school, and wrote the song's lyrics as a corrective for issues with contemporary dating and hookup culture, like women basing their self-worth on social media likes and whether their partner replied to their texts: "I hope people can hear my songs and know I'm a badass girl and I deserve a good guy to take me out on a date."

"Dear Future Husband" was included as a B-side on the digital release of "All About That Bass" in some European countries, and Trainor's debut major-label studio album, Title (2015). The song began gaining popularity and entered the Billboard Hot 100 in September 2014, attaining a Gold certification from the Recording Industry Association of America (RIAA) on January 7, 2015. Epic Records chose "Dear Future Husband" as the third single from the album, and sent it to contemporary hit radio stations in the United States on March 17, 2015, and for radio airplay in Italy on May 8, 2015. On June 26, 2015, Sony Music released the song as a CD single in Germany.

== Composition and lyrical interpretation ==
"Dear Future Husband"
"Dear Future Husband" has a low-pitched chorus (sampled) which Trainor thought would be easy to chant along to; its melody received widespread comparisons to that of "Runaround Sue".

"Dear Future Husband" is three minutes and four seconds long. Kadish produced, recorded, engineered, and mixed the song at the Carriage House studio in Nolensville, Tennessee. He handled drum programming, sound design, and plays the acoustic guitar, electric guitar, bass, and synthesizer, David Baron plays the piano and Hammond organ, and Jim Hoke plays the baritone and tenor saxophone. Dave Kutch mastered it at The Mastering Palace in New York City.

"Dear Future Husband" is a doo-wop and pop song, with influences of jazz. The song opens with the sound of a stylus on a damaged vinyl which transitions into retro ukulele instrumentation. It incorporates brisk piano, buoyant brass, and a drum track that "kicks harder than many 2014 rock bands" according to Stereogum's Chris DeVille. Alexandra Petri of The Washington Post described "Dear Future Husband" as a "playful pop throwback to the 1950s", while Chuck Arnold of Rolling Stone called it "girl-group bounce". Critics compared the song's melody to that of "Runaround Sue", and The Columbus Dispatch's Glenn Gamboa likened it to Gary U.S. Bonds's 1961 single "Quarter to Three".

"Dear Future Husband" has lyrics about chivalry and dating. The song presents a list of the things a man needs to do in order to win Trainor's adoration and dedication, and be her life partner. Her requests include "treat[ing her] like a lady" even when she behaves insanely, calling her pretty every night, and putting her family above his. Trainor promises to buy the groceries as long as he buys her flowers, and assures him of sexual favors as a reward if he follows her rules. According to Dolan, its lyrics imagine "marriage as a contract between equals who work and don't cook".

== Critical reception ==
Some music critics praised the playful nature of "Dear Future Husband" and compared its lyrics to other Trainor songs. Entertainment Weekly's Adam Markovitz jokingly remarked that the song's subject may follow her orders if she kept creating enticing and "kitschy sock-hop throwbacks" like it. Melissa Maerz of the same magazine named it one of the two best songs on the album, and stated that future wives-to-be would agree with the list of expectations Trainor sets out on the song. Writing for Milwaukee Journal Sentinel, Piet Levy called "Dear Future Husband" as "cute as a clever rom-com" and praised her humorous innuendos and alternative take on gender roles in a marriage. Mikael Wood of the Los Angeles Times deemed the song a "bouncy" reimagination of the groove of "Runaround Sue". DeVille complimented its smooth production but considered it lyrically interchangeable with Trainor's track "Title" (2014). Lindsey Weber of New York opined that the lyrics of "Dear Future Husband" render it a sequel of "All About That Bass".

Other critics were negative about the portrayal of gender roles in the lyrics of "Dear Future Husband". Writing for Time, Nolan Feeney was critical of the song and remarked that it describes a "Meghtatorship" instead of a "relationship". Mic's Kate Beaudoin thought it sends a message that "men are born to be husbands and women are born to be wives", and hinders a woman's authority to choose who she wants to be. Heidi Stevens of the Chicago Tribune wrote that the lyrics of "Dear Future Husband" deceptively seem empowering and modern at surface value, but are sadly regressive. She criticized Trainor for offering sex as a prize and thought the song compromises women's sexual agency. Petri rewrote its lyrics to make them more politically correct, and noted that just like "All About That Bass", its message lacked self-awareness. Writing for the Los Angeles Times, Chris Barton and Gerrick D. Kennedy, respectively, listed "Dear Future Husband" among the most overrated and worst moments of pop culture in 2015, owing to its backward views on gender.

== Commercial performance ==
"Dear Future Husband" first appeared on the chart at number 94 on the US Billboard Hot 100 issued for September 27, 2014, and later reappeared at 64 on the issue for January 10, 2015. Following its release as a single, the song re-entered at number 47. It peaked at number 14 on the chart issued for June 6, 2015, and sold its millionth download the same week. The RIAA certified "Dear Future Husband" 3× Platinum. In Canada, the song peaked at number 22 on the Canadian Hot 100 and was certified 4× Platinum by Music Canada. It reached number 20 on the UK Singles Chart, and earned a Platinum certification from the British Phonographic Industry.

In Australia, "Dear Future Husband" peaked at number nine, and became Trainor's third song to reach the top 10. The Australian Recording Industry Association certified the song 5× Platinum in 2023. It charted at number 27 in New Zealand and received a triple platinum certification from Recorded Music NZ. "Dear Future Husband" reached the top 15 of national record charts, at number 3 in South Africa, number 4 in Venezuela, number 5 in the Netherlands, Poland, number 11 in Belgium, the Czech Republic, number 12 in Scotland, and number 14 in Austria. The song received a Platinum+Gold certification in Mexico, Platinum in Sweden, and Gold in Denmark and Spain.

== Music video ==
=== Background and synopsis ===
Fatima Robinson directed the Stepford Wives-inspired music video for "Dear Future Husband". Trainor shared a black and white teaser of it on her Instagram account on March 12, 2015. She premiered the video on Today four days later, where she also announced that she would go on tour. Charlie Puth, with whom Trainor collaborated on the song "Marvin Gaye" (2015), makes a cameo in it.

In the video, Trainor performs the song in a latex blue skirt, leopard-print tank top, and red cropped leather jacket with a barbershop quartet. She engages in household chores such as baking pies in the kitchen and scrubbing floors. Trainor uses a dating app reminiscent of Tinder to audition different men to be her partner. They present gifts to her and one of them fails at his attempt to hit the bell on a carnival strength tester machine. Trainor stamps the word "fail" and rejects them one-by-one as they are unsuccessful in following her rules. In the end, she approves of Puth when he brings her a pizza.

=== Reception ===
Some critics praised the video's throwback style and Trainor's look. Billboard's Jason Lipshutz thought it "owns its pastiche of retro signifiers" while switching up domiciliary expectations. Shiela Cosgrove Baylis of People wrote that though she took on a more domestic role in the video than her previous ones, it still retained her eccentric fashion choices and "slumber-party dance moves". Others were critical and compared it to different music videos. Feeney stated the video was more frightening than Taylor Swift's portrayal of the "crazy-ex-girlfriend" in the one for "Blank Space" (2014), despite Trainor not using knives as a weapon in it. Writing for USA Today, Kelly Lawler described it as "a lot" and criticized it for having too many things going on at once, noting it lacked the "healthy sense of irony" displayed in the videos for "Blank Space" and Carrie Underwood's "Before He Cheats" (2006). Weber wrote that if Trainor is trying to send a message to her future spouse, someone should ensure that it never reaches him.

The video caused controversy and garnered criticism online, over allegations of antifeminism, sexism, and perpetuation of gender stereotypes, which followed similar backlash Trainor had received for "All About That Bass". Critics accused it of hindering women by suggesting that they should only be domestic housewives. She responded by denying the allegations and explaining her intention: "I think I was just writing my song to my future husband out there, wherever he is. He's chilling right now, taking a minute getting ready for me; it's going to be great." Wendy Geller of Yahoo! thought "it should be obvious that the song and music video aren't meant to be taken seriously", and believed the controversy may unintentionally propel the video's views.

== Live performances and other usage ==
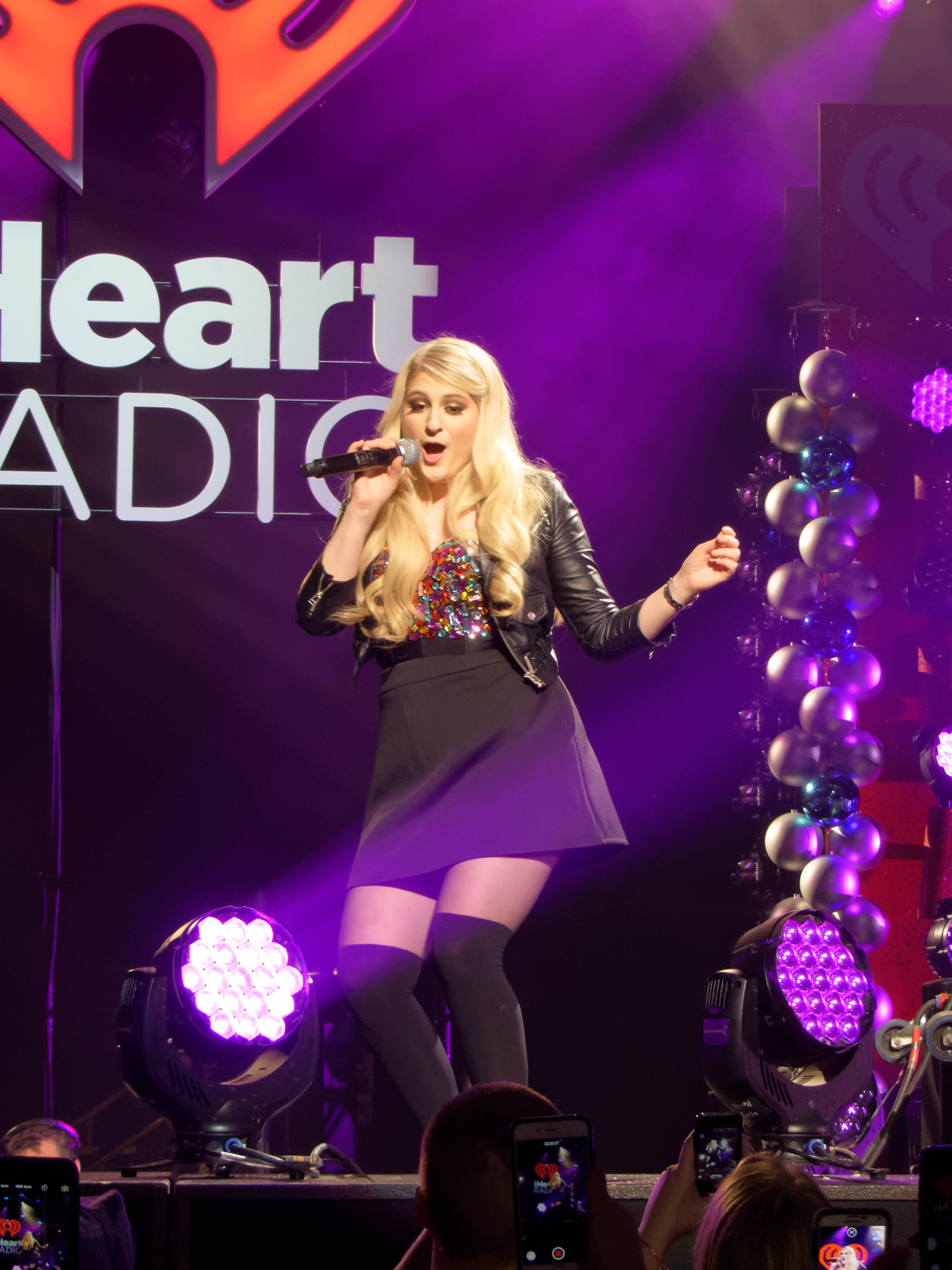
Trainor performing "Dear Future Husband" on the 2014 Jingle Ball Tour.

Trainor performed "Dear Future Husband" live in a sailor's hat and knee-length skirt at the iHeartRadio Music Awards on March 29, 2015. Her male backup dancers were dressed as seamen in red suspenders, boaters, and short pants. MTV News' Brenna Ehrlich commented they looked like extras from H.M.S. Pinafore and Trainor resembled a 1950s pin-up model, while The Hollywood Reporter's Ashley Lee described the rendition as throwback sailor-themed heaven. On May 19, 2015, Trainor performed an acoustic version of the song on her ukulele at the eighth season of The Voice, accompanied by Kadish on guitar. She was surrounded by lamps during it. Jodi Walker of Entertainment Weekly wrote that the performance illustrated to the show's future winner that the record industry can be a place for "music that sounds like a current spin on a different generation of music". Trainor sang it on Today on May 22, in a set that also featured "All About That Bass", "Lips Are Movin", and "Like I'm Gonna Lose You" (2015).

Trainor opened her That Bass Tour (2015) by performing "Dear Future Husband" in a blue-green crinoline with pleats and an enchanting top, which USA Today's Carlee Wright considered a strong start to the show. She also performed the song as the first on the MTrain Tour (2015), with a band and four backup dancers. Trainor included it on her set list for the 2014 Jingle Ball Tour, the Untouchable Tour (2016), and the Timeless Tour (2024). On January 18, 2020, Trainor and fellow judge Olly Murs performed "Dear Future Husband" as a mashup with the latter's 2011 single "Dance with Me Tonight", on the ninth season of The Voice UK, after he pointed out similarities between the tracks.

A gay couple from Minneapolis trying to adopt a baby released a parody of "Dear Future Husband" in March 2015, entitled "Dear Future Baby", about "how they promise to be the best dads they can be". In September, the Society for the Prevention of Cruelty to Animals of Anne Arundel County, Maryland, made a parody of the song from the narrative of shelter animals listing their demands from future families. Stanford University's medical students created a parody of it about things an aspiring doctor should not do, entitled "Dear Future Doctor", which was released in November and accumulated 120,000 views on YouTube within a month.

== Credits and personnel ==
Credits are adapted from the liner notes of Title.

=== Recording locations ===
- Recorded, engineered, and mixed at The Carriage House, Nolensville, Tennessee
- Mastered at The Mastering Palace, New York City

=== Personnel ===
- Kevin Kadish – producer, songwriter, recording, engineering, mixing, drum programming, acoustic guitar, electric guitar, bass, synthesizer, sound design
- Meghan Trainor – songwriter
- Dave Kutch – mastering
- David Baron – piano, Hammond organ
- Jim Hoke – baritone saxophone, tenor saxophone

== Charts ==
=== Weekly charts ===
Weekly chart positions for "Dear Future Husband"
Chart (2014–2016)	Peak position
Australia (ARIA)	9
Austria (Ö3 Austria Top 40)	14
Belgium (Ultratip Bubbling Under Flanders)	11
Belgium (Ultratip Bubbling Under Wallonia)	16
Canada Hot 100 (Billboard)	22
Czech Republic Airplay (ČNS IFPI)	11
Czech Republic Singles Digital (ČNS IFPI)	19
Germany (Official German Charts)	37
Hungary (Stream Top 40)	35
Ireland (IRMA)	26
Mexico Anglo (Monitor Latino)	17
Netherlands (Tipparade)	5
Netherlands (Single Top 100)	72
New Zealand (Recorded Music NZ)	27
Poland (Polish Airplay New)	5
Scottish Singles Sales (Official Charts)	12
Slovakia Airplay (ČNS IFPI)	33
Slovakia Singles Digital (ČNS IFPI)	21
Slovenia (SloTop50)	17
South Africa (EMA)	3
Spain (Promusicae)	54
Sweden (Sverigetopplistan)	58
Switzerland (Schweizer Hitparade)	57
UK Singles (Official Charts)	20
US Billboard Hot 100	14
US Adult Contemporary (Billboard)	19
US Adult Pop Airplay (Billboard)	13
US Dance Airplay (Billboard)	39
US Pop Airplay (Billboard)	16
Venezuela (Record Report)	94
Venezuela (Top Pop General)	18
Venezuela (Top Anglo)	4

=== Year-end charts ===
Year-end chart positions for "Dear Future Husband"
Chart (2015)	Position
Australia (ARIA)	39
Austria (Ö3 Austria Top 40)	68
Canada (Canadian Hot 100)	96
US Billboard Hot 100	74

== Certifications ==
Certifications for "Dear Future Husband"
Region	Certification	Certified units/sales
Australia (ARIA)	5× Platinum	350,000^{‡}
Brazil (Pro-Música Brasil)	2× Platinum	120,000^{‡}
Canada (Music Canada)	4× Platinum	320,000^{‡}
Denmark (IFPI Danmark)	Platinum	90,000^{‡}
Germany (BVMI)	Gold	200,000^{‡}
Mexico (AMPROFON)	Platinum+Gold	90,000^{‡}
New Zealand (RMNZ)	3× Platinum	90,000^{‡}
Spain (Promusicae)	Gold	20,000^{‡}
Sweden (GLF)	Platinum	40,000^{‡}
United Kingdom (BPI)	Platinum	600,000^{‡}
United States (RIAA)	3× Platinum	3,000,000^{‡}
^{‡} Sales+streaming figures based on certification alone.

== Radio and release history ==
Release dates and format(s) for "Dear Future Husband"
Region	Date	Format	Label	Ref.
United States	March 17, 2015	Contemporary hit radio	Epic	
Italy	May 8, 2015	Radio airplay	Epic	
Germany	June 26, 2015	CD single	Sony	
