= Title (song) =

Song by Meghan Trainor

from the album Title and the EP Title
- B-side: "All About That Bass"
- Released: September 9, 2014
- Studio: The Carriage House (Nolensville, Tennessee)
- Genre: Doo-wop
- Length: 2:54
- Label: Epic
- Songwriters: Meghan Trainor; Kevin Kadish
- Producer: Kevin Kadish

Music video
- "Title" on YouTube

"Title" is a song by American singer-songwriter Meghan Trainor from her 2014 debut extended play (EP) Title and her 2015 studio album of the same name. She wrote the track with its producer Kevin Kadish. They recorded the track at the Carriage House, based in Nolensville, Tennessee. It was originally slated for release as Trainor's second single, but was shelved after L.A. Reid heard "Lips Are Movin", and felt the song would be more successful. The song is in a doo-wop style with Caribbean influences. Lyrically, Trainor demands that her partner define their relationship more clearly and call her his girlfriend.

Upon the release of Title, its title track received mixed reviews from music critics for its production and rap verse, but some were positive about the lyrics. The song reached number nine in New Zealand and entered the charts in several other countries. It received Platinum certifications in Australia, Canada, and New Zealand, and Gold in the United States. The song became a trend on the video-sharing service TikTok in 2021.

Anthony Phan directed the music video for "Title", which depicts Trainor performing at a Mr. America–style beauty pageant. After initially being exclusive to the DVD on the special edition of Title, the video was officially uploaded in December 2021. Trainor performed the song at the 2014 iHeartRadio Music Festival and in sessions for MTV and the National Post, and included it on the set lists of her 2015 concert tours That Bass Tour, the MTrain Tour, and the Timeless Tour (2024).

== Background ==
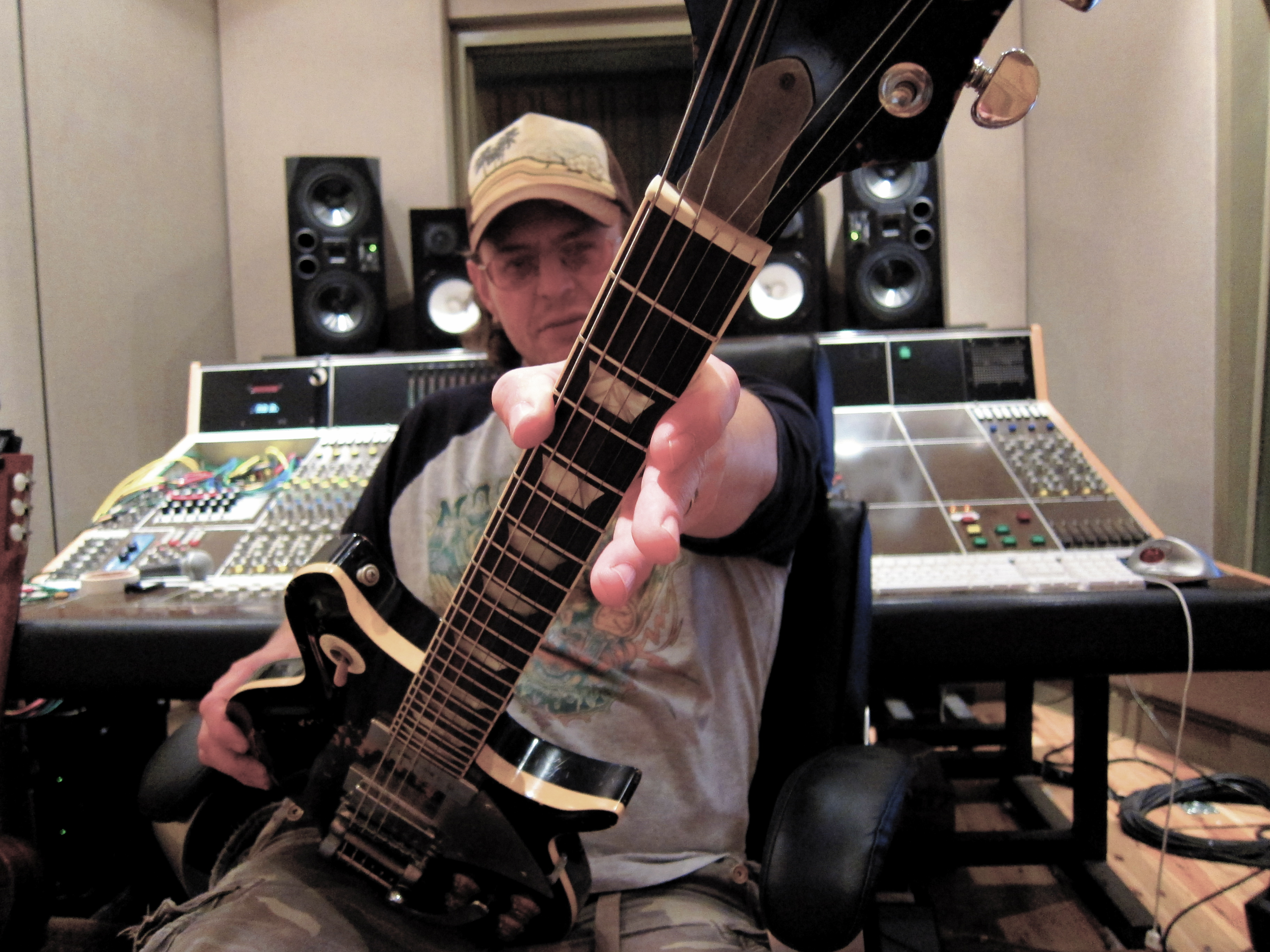
Kevin Kadish (pictured in 2010) produced and co-wrote "Title".

American songwriter Kevin Kadish met Meghan Trainor in June 2013 at the request of Carla Wallace, the co-owner of Trainor's publishing firm Big Yellow Dog Music. Kadish liked Trainor's voice and felt a strong songwriting affinity with her due to their mutual love of pop music from the 1950s and 1960s. They wrote the song "All About That Bass", which led to Trainor signing with Epic Records after she performed it for the label's chairman, L.A. Reid. Kadish and Trainor began working on more songs immediately as the label wanted her to record an entire album. "All About That Bass" was released as Trainor's debut single in June 2014, and it reached number one in 58 countries, selling 11 million units worldwide.

Kadish and Trainor wrote "Title" as the second track for Trainor's 1950s-influenced debut EP, Title (2014), which they created "just for fun". Trainor considered its Caribbean drum and rap bridge new territory for her, that showcased "what [her] sound really is". In a 2014 Billboard interview, she recounted being ill-treated by her romantic partners in high school and was inspired to write the song about issues with contemporary dating and hookup culture, like women basing their self-worth on social media likes and whether their partner replied to their texts. Trainor described it in an interview: "Call me your girlfriend, I'm sick of being your boo thing, so call me your girlfriend and give me that title".

MTV News premiered "Title" on September 5, 2014, and it was released along with the EP four days later. That month, MTV News reported that the song would serve as Trainor's second single. She revealed in October that it was nearly scrapped in favor of "Dear Future Husband", which is more sonically similar to "All About That Bass". Kadish went to New York to meet with Reid after writing the song "Lips Are Movin" (2014) with Trainor, and he voiced his regret about not having it ready in time for the EP and its potential release as the follow-up single. Reid announced at the meeting that it would replace "Title", and was quoted by Kadish as saying, "I think this song will do better." "Lips Are Movin" reached number four on the US Billboard Hot 100. "Title" was included as the ninth track on her 2015 debut major-label studio album, Title.

== Composition and lyrical interpretation ==
"Title" is two minutes and 54 seconds long. Kadish produced, recorded, engineered, and mixed the song at the Carriage House studio in Nolensville, Tennessee. He handled drum programming, and plays the acoustic guitar, electric guitar, bass, and synthesizer, Trainor plays the ukulele, and David Baron plays the piano and Hammond organ. Dave Kutch mastered it at The Mastering Palace in New York City.

"Title" is a doo-wop song with Caribbean music influences and a ska-tinged bridge. The song fuses horns and backing vocals "with ukulele folk-pop and island percussion", transitioning into a programmed beat, according to Stereogum's Chris DeVille. It also makes use of handclaps and contemporary sound effects. Trainor assumes a patois during the rap verse of "Title". According to Knoxville News Sentinel, she projects a confident and retro aural tone on the song. MTV News's Christina Garibaldi thought it elicits a "throwback vibe" from its "infectious" beat, and DeVille defined it as "modern-retro pastiche".

In the lyrics of "Title", Trainor pushes her partner to define their relationship more clearly and refer to her as his girlfriend. She refuses to be a friend with benefits and threatens to leave him if he treats her like a temporary liaison. Trainor asks him to "treat [her] like a trophy [and] put [her] on a shelf" and "get up on that bike" without using his hands. L. V. Anderson of Slate described the song as "the cri de coeur of a woman who's tired of being seen as a casual hookup by the man in her life". Its lyrical theme is the same as "Dear Future Husband", which led Knoxville News Sentinel and DeVille to compare the songs.

== Critical reception ==
Music critics were divided on the lyrics of "Title". Entertainment Weekly's Melissa Maerz remarked that they are perfectly balanced between racy and cute. Garibaldi thought the song sends a powerful message. DeVille did not find its lyrics problematic, and he opined that Trainor's insistence for commitment was not disparate from renowned feminist Beyoncé's on her 2008 single "Single Ladies (Put a Ring on It)". Anderson found her intentions understandable and was in awe of her confidence, but he thought that "every line of 'Title' perpetuates a retrograde belief about relationships" and sets a horrible precedent for young women.

Writing for Vulture, Lindsey Weber found the production "very catchy" and deemed it enjoyable for people who like "All About That Bass". DeVille wrote that though he does not find "DJ scratching and rewind sounds" progressive and extravagant, the song turned out to be cutting and sprightly. Toronto Star's Ben Rayner wrote that it is "whitewashed into a fairly anodyne mush", and he declared its "hip-hop bump and plush bassline" an attempt to make Trainor's "old-timey aesthetic" feel contemporary. Garibaldi was positive about her rap verse, but Alexa Camp of Slant Magazine thought it lacked authenticity and that Trainor deserved the same sort of criticism from hip-hop reviewers as that received by Iggy Azalea.

== Promotion ==
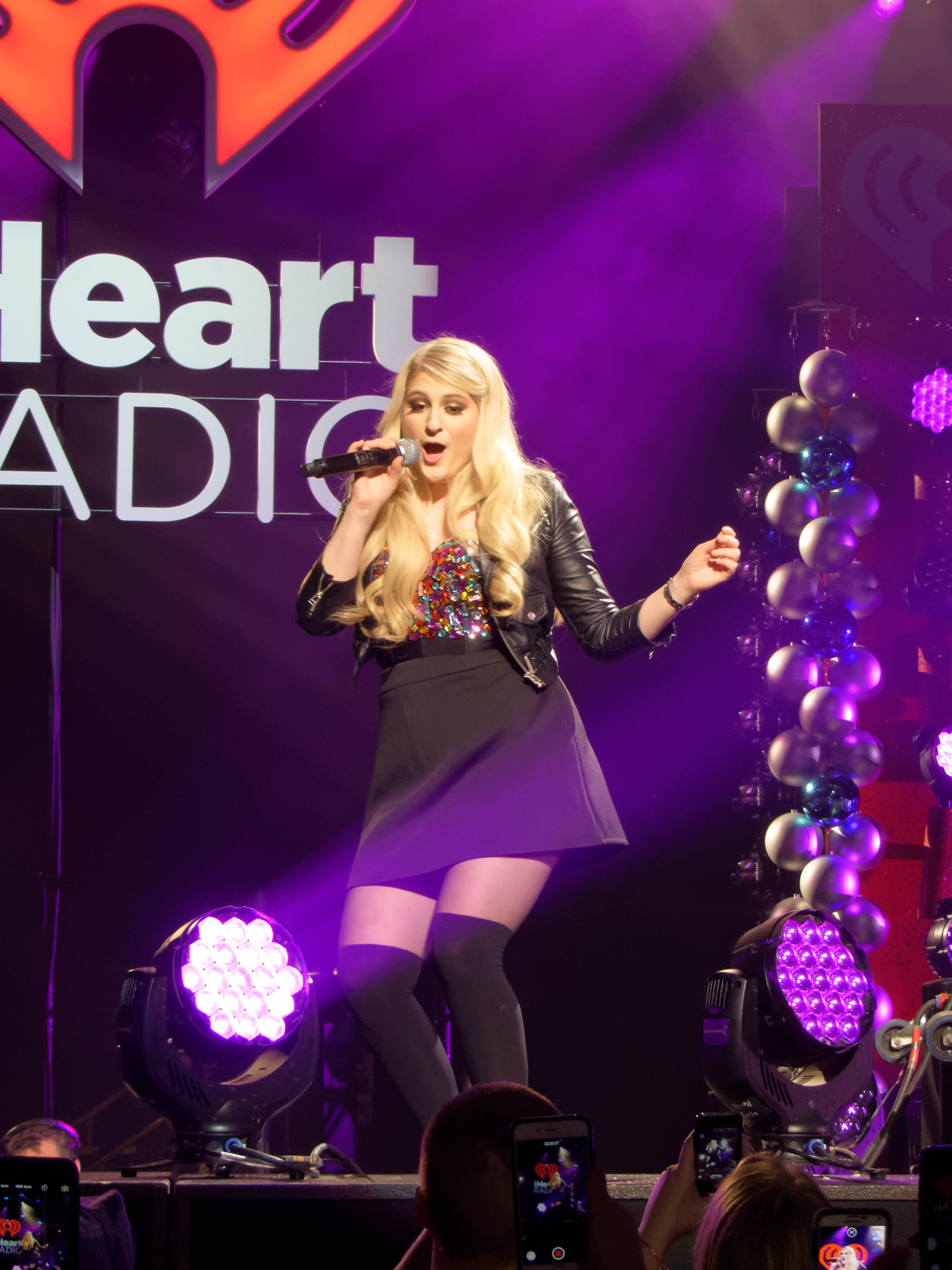
Trainor performing on the Jingle Ball Tour 2014

Trainor performed "Title" as a mashup with "All About That Bass" live for the first time at the iHeartRadio Music Festival in September 2014. She reprised the song for MTV on October 6, 2014, and in a session for the National Post eight days later. Trainor included it in her set list for the Jingle Ball Tour 2014 and her 2015 concert tours That Bass Tour and MTrain Tour.

Anthony Phan directed the music video for "Title", which was shot at a downtown movie palace in Los Angeles on October 7, 2014. Trainor was accompanied by several filmmakers and male models who wore sashes at its shoot. In it, Trainor performs "Title" at a Miss America–style pageant, where all of the contestants are muscular men instead of women, while her brother Ryan films them. The contestants get ready in their dressing rooms and walk down a runway in the subsequent stages of the competition. She sings the song on staircases and a flower couch, and concludes the video by crowning a winner. The video was released exclusively on the album's special edition on November 20, 2015.

=== 2021 resurgence and impact ===
Trainor's popularity waned in the lead-up to the release of her third major-label studio album, Treat Myself (2020). Traditional methods of promotion proved ineffective, and the COVID-19 lockdowns prevented her from giving live performances. In 2021, "Title" became the first of three older Trainor songs to trend on the video sharing service TikTok, when users including mothers, teenagers, influencers, and celebrities like Genelia D'Souza, Stephen Mulhern, and Zach Wilson, posted a cumulative 4,659 videos dancing to it. Trainor responded favorably: "I felt like it was my birthday every day, I thought it was the coolest thing ever." She hinted at the music video's release on TikTok on December 14, 2021, and uploaded it to YouTube the following day. The resurgence inspired Trainor to return to making doo-wop music for her 2022 album Takin' It Back. "Made You Look", that album's second single, was also promoted with a viral TikTok dance challenge and became her highest-charting single since 2016 in the United States. Trainor included "Title" on the set list of her 2024 concert tour, the Timeless Tour.

== Commercial performance ==
"Title" charted at number 100 on the US Billboard Hot 100 issued for January 10, 2015, and received a Gold certification from the Recording Industry Association of America. Music Canada certified the song Platinum. It received a Platinum certification from the Australian Recording Industry Association in 2023. In New Zealand, "Title" peaked at number nine and became Trainor's second song to reach the top 10. Recorded Music NZ certified it Platinum. "Title" reached number 31 in Hungary. The song charted on national record charts, at number 16 in Japan (Hot Overseas), number 31 in Belgium (Ultratip), number 41 in Poland, and number 55 in Vietnam. It became Trainor's second song to enter the Billboard Global Excl. U.S. chart, peaking at number 172.

== Credits and personnel ==
Credits are adapted from the liner notes of Title.

=== Recording locations ===
- Recorded, engineered, and mixed at The Carriage House, Nolensville, Tennessee
- Mastered at The Mastering Palace, New York City
- Published by Year of the Dog Music (ASCAP), a division of Big Yellow Dog LLC.

=== Personnel ===
- Kevin Kadish – producer, songwriter, recording, engineering, mixing, drum programming, acoustic guitar, electric guitar, bass, synthesizer
- Meghan Trainor – songwriter, ukulele
- Dave Kutch – mastering
- David Baron – piano, Hammond organ

== Charts ==
2014—2015 weekly chart performance for "Title"
Chart	Peak position
Belgium (Ultratip Bubbling Under Wallonia)	31
New Zealand (Recorded Music NZ)	9
US Billboard Hot 100	100

2021—2022 weekly chart performance for "Title"
Chart	Peak position
Global Excl. U.S. (Billboard)	172
Hungary (Single Top 40)	31
Japan Hot Overseas (Billboard Japan)	16
Poland Airplay (ZPAV)	41
UK Video Streaming (Official Charts)	45
Vietnam (Billboard Vietnam)	55

== Certifications ==
Certifications for "Title"
Region	Certification	Certified units/sales
Australia (ARIA)	Platinum	70,000^{‡}
Canada (Music Canada)	Platinum	80,000^{‡}
New Zealand (RMNZ)	Platinum	15,000^{*}
United States (RIAA)	Gold	500,000^{‡}
^{*} Sales figures based on certification alone.^{‡} Sales+streaming figures based on certification alone.
