= Coldwater Jane =

American country music duo

- Origin: Nashville, Tennessee, United States
- Genres: Country
- Years active: 2010-2011
- Labels: Mercury Records Nashville
- Past members: Leah Crutchfield; Brandon Jane

Coldwater Jane was an American country music duo consisting of vocalists Brandon Jane and Leah Crutchfield, who are sisters. from Lucedale, Mississippi. They released one single, "Bring On the Love", and one album, Marionette, for Mercury Records Nashville.

== Biography ==
Sisters Brandon Jane and Leah Crutchfield are natives of Lucedale, Mississippi.

The duo signed to Mercury Records' Nashville branch and released its debut single, "Bring On the Love," to radio in early 2010. This song has charted on the Billboard Hot Country Songs charts and has been made into a music video which has aired on Country Music Television and Great American Country. Jane and Crutchfield wrote the song in a jam session with record producers Wayne Kirkpatrick and Jane's husband Kevin Kadish. The song received a positive rating from Bobby Peacock of Roughstock, who thought that the song was not country in sound, but said that it had "intriguing lyrics."

Their album Marionette was released on August 29, 2011, and received positive reviews. Matt Bjorke of Roughstock says the album is a "standout" for the year and said "While the great single starts off the record with a stunning sense of urgency and bewilderment over the fact that the world seems to be fragmented, it is the following tracks on Marionette that truly showcase the talent Coldwater Jane possesses" Ron Kelly of Ladies Home Journal says "the release of their long-awaited debut CD Marionette proves to be another testament to this duo’s ability to put their heads down and get the job done, all while having some fun along the way."

== Discography ==
=== Albums ===
Title	Details
Marionette	Release date: August 29, 2011; Label: Mercury Nashville

=== Singles ===
Year	Single	Peak positions	Album
Year	Single	US Country	Album
2010	"Bring On the Love"	47	Marionette

=== Music videos ===
Year	Video	Director
2010	"Bring On the Love"	Shaun Silva
2011	"Marionette"	Beck Underwood
