= MTrain Tour =

2015 concert tour by Meghan Trainor

- Tour by Meghan Trainor
- Associated album: Title
- Start date: July 14, 2015
- End date: August 8, 2015
- Legs: 1
- No. of shows: 13

Meghan Trainor concert chronology
- That Bass Tour (2015); MTrain Tour (2015); The Untouchable Tour (2016)

The MTrain Tour was the second North America headlining concert tour by American singer-songwriter Meghan Trainor to support of her 2015 debut major-label studio album Title. The tour was announced in March 2015, with dates being released at the same time. The show was exclusively promoted by Live Nation Entertainment. The set list featured the majority of the songs from Title. The tour was positively received by critics. The remainder of the tour was canceled on August 11, 2015, because Trainor suffered a vocal cord hemorrhage. As a result, Trainor was able to complete only 13 of the originally scheduled 29 shows.

== Background and development ==
On March 16, 2015, Meghan Trainor announced her second concert tour, MTrain Tour, to support her debut studio album Title (2015). Tour dates were released on the same day, and tickets were released on March 20, 2015. Live Nation Entertainment were announced to be the tour's exclusive promoters, and HP as its sponsor. The set list included fourteen songs from Title along with a cover of Jason Mraz's "I'm Yours" and a dance section featuring LunchMoney Lewis' "Bills".

== Synopsis ==
Trainor starts the hour-long concert with a performance of "Dear Future Husband", accompanied by her band, two backup singers and two dancers on stage. Trainor performs acoustic version of “Title” and a mashup of her song "3am" and Mraz's song "I'm Yours" with a ukulele and a guitar. These songs are performed on Trainor's ukulele, which gives them a "new, island vibe" according to The Sun Chronicle's Jenna Noel. "Walkashame" is then performed. At each concert, Trainor calls a person from the audience on-stage to dance with her in front of the crowd. The person is crowned "king" or "queen" using light-up headbands. "Close Your Eyes" and "Like I'm Gonna Lose You" precede a performance of "Marvin Gaye" for which Charlie Puth joins Trainor. This is followed by a short dance break to Lewis' song "Bills". Trainor performs her song "Better When I'm Dancin'". The set is finished with "Good to Be Alive" and "All About That Bass" as the encore.

== Reception ==
Jackie Frere of Billboard gave the show at the Hollywood Palladium a rating of four out of five stars. She noted that Trainor gave a good performance despite her then recent vocal cord damage, writing "there was little evidence that Trainor hasn't made a nearly full recovery from her hemorrhage". Writing for The Sun Chronicle, Jenna Noel was positive of the show, and stated that she "had her A-game with her", and displayed "enthusiasm and confidence".

== Set list ==
This set list is representative of the show in St. Louis, on July 14, 2015. It is not representative in all of the concerts in the tour.

1. "Dear Future Husband"
2. "Mr. Almost"
3. "No Good for You"
4. "Title"
5. "Walkashame"
6. "Queen"
7. "Close Your Eyes"
8. "Like I'm Gonna Lose You"
9. "Marvin Gaye"
10. "Bang Dem Sticks"
11. "Bills"
12. "3am" / "I'm Yours"
13. "Better When I'm Dancin'"
14. "What If I"
15. "Lips Are Movin"
  Encore
16. "Good to Be Alive"
17. "All About That Bass"

== Tour cancellation ==
Trainor postponed the tour's first two scheduled dates; July 3, 2015, in Atlantic City and July 4, 2015, in Uncasville due to vocal cord hemorrhage to September 13, 2015, and September 7, 2015, respectively. On July 6, 2015, Trainor announced that her doctors wanted her on "complete vocal rest" until her vocal cords healed; this led to the rescheduling of the Detroit and Chicago dates to September 11, 2015, and September 9, 2015, respectively, as well as the cancellation of Trainor's performance at the Common Ground Music Festival in Lansing. The tour began on July 14, 2015, with the St. Louis show happening as originally planned. On August 11, 2015, Trainor announced on Instagram that she had suffered another vocal cord hemorrhage, thus canceling the remainder of the tour as well as the dates rescheduled for September.

== Shows ==
List of concerts, showing date, city, country, venue, and opening act(s)
Date (2015)	City	Country	Venue	Opening act(s)
July 14	St. Louis	United States	The Pageant	Charlie Puth; Life of Dillon
July 16	San Antonio	United States	Tobin Center for the Performing Arts	Charlie Puth; Life of Dillon
July 18	Denver	United States	Fillmore Auditorium	Charlie Puth; Life of Dillon
July 21	San Francisco	United States	SF Masonic Auditorium	Charlie Puth; Life of Dillon
July 22 (Note: The July 22, 2015, show is part of the California Mid State Fair.)	Paso Robles	United States	Chumash Grandstand Arena	Charlie Puth; Life of Dillon
July 24	Los Angeles	United States	Hollywood Palladium	Charlie Puth; Life of Dillon
July 27 (Note: The July 27, 2015, show is part of the Delaware State Fair.)	Harrington	United States	M&T Bank Grandstand	Charlie Puth; Life of Dillon
July 29 (Note: The July 29, 2015, show is part of the Troy Fair.)	Troy	United States	Troy Fair Grandstand	Charlie Puth; Life of Dillon
July 31	New York City	United States	JBL Live	Charlie Puth; Life of Dillon
August 2 (Note: The August 2, 2015, show is part of the Ohio State Fair.)	Columbus	United States	Celeste Center	Charlie Puth; Life of Dillon
August 5	Philadelphia	United States	Festival Pier	Charlie Puth; Life of Dillon
August 6	Boston	United States	Leader Bank Pavilion	Charlie Puth; Life of Dillon
August 8 (Note: The August 8, 2015, show is part of the Saint-Jean-sur-Richelieu International Balloon Festival.)	Saint-Jean-sur-Richelieu	Canada	Saint-Jean Airport	Life of Dillon

Official boxscore office data

List of concerts, showing date, city, country, venue, attendance and gross revenue
Date (2015)	City	Country	Venue	Attendance (tickets sold / available)	Revenue
July 16	San Antonio	United States	Tobin Center for the Performing Arts	2,169 / 2,169	$75,900

== Canceled shows ==
List of canceled concerts, showing date, city, country, venue and reason for cancellation
Date (2015)	City	Country	Venue	Reason
July 7	Lansing	United States	Common Ground Music Festival	Vocal cord hemorrhage
August 11 (Note: The August 11, 2015, show was originally part of the Indiana State Fair.)	Indianapolis	United States	Indiana State Fair	Vocal cord hemorrhage
August 13 (Note: The August 13, 2015, show was originally part of the Erie County Fair.)	Hamburg	United States	Erie County Fair	Vocal cord hemorrhage
August 15	Nashville	United States	Ryman Auditorium	Vocal cord hemorrhage
August 16	Atlanta	United States	The Tabernacle	Vocal cord hemorrhage
August 18	Raleigh	United States	Ritz	Vocal cord hemorrhage
August 20 (Note: The August 20, 2015, show was originally part of the Kentucky State Fair.)	Louisville	United States	Freedom Hall	Vocal cord hemorrhage
August 22 (Note: The August 22, 2015, show was originally part of the Iowa State Fair.)	Des Moines	United States	Iowa State Fair	Vocal cord hemorrhage
September 1 (Note: The September 1, 2015, show was originally part of the Minnesota State Fair.)	Saint Paul	United States	Minnesota State Fair	Vocal cord hemorrhage
September 3 (Note: The September 3, 2015, show was originally part of the New York State Fair.)	Syracuse	United States	New York State Fair	Vocal cord hemorrhage
September 4	Essex Junction	United States	Champlain Valley Exposition	Vocal cord hemorrhage
September 6 (Note: The September 6, 2015, show was originally part of the Allentown Fair.)	Allentown	United States	Great Allentown Fair	Vocal cord hemorrhage
September 7 (Note: All the dates after September 7, 2015, were postponed from their original events to September due to vocal cord hemorrhage.)	Uncasville	United States	Mohegan Sun Arena	Vocal cord hemorrhage
September 9	Chicago	United States	Aragon Ballroom	Vocal cord hemorrhage
September 11	Detroit	United States	The Fillmore Detroit	Vocal cord hemorrhage
September 13	Atlantic City	United States	Borgata	Vocal cord hemorrhage
