= Lips Are Movin =

2014 single by Meghan Trainor

Single by Meghan Trainor

from the album Title
- Released: October 21, 2014
- Recorded: 2014
- Studio: The Carriage House (Nolensville, Tennessee)
- Genre: Doo-wop; bubblegum pop
- Length: 3:01
- Label: Epic
- Songwriters: Meghan Trainor; Kevin Kadish
- Producer: Kevin Kadish

Meghan Trainor singles chronology
"All About That Bass" (2014)	"Lips Are Movin" (2014)	"Marvin Gaye" (2015)

Music video
- "Lips Are Movin" on YouTube

"Lips Are Movin" is a song by the American singer-songwriter Meghan Trainor, taken from her debut major-label studio album, Title (2015). It was written by Trainor and the album's producer, Kevin Kadish. Epic Records premiered the song on MTV News on October 15, 2014, and released it to the United States contemporary hit radio stations on October 21, as the second single from Title. A retro-tinged doo-wop and pop song with girl group harmonies and bubblegum pop hooks, "Lips Are Movin" was later revealed to be inspired by Trainor's conflict by executives at her record label Epic Records, but also mentioned the idea was drawn from a partner who was constantly cheating on her.

Critics drew similarities between the song's style and that of Trainor's debut single, "All About That Bass" (2014). Some deemed the song catchy, while others criticized its lyrics. In the United States, "Lips Are Movin" reached number 4 on the Billboard Hot 100 and was certified quadruple platinum by the Recording Industry Association of America (RIAA). It received platinum or multi-platinum certifications in Australia, Canada, New Zealand, and the United Kingdom, and reached the top 10 on their charts among others.

Philip Andelman directed the music video for "Lips Are Movin", which was commissioned by the technology company Hewlett-Packard. The first-ever music video created entirely by social media influencers, it portrays behind-the-scenes events of a video shoot. Trainor performed "Lips Are Movin" on televised shows such as Today, The Voice, and Dancing with the Stars, and included it on the set lists for four of her concert tours: 2015's That Bass Tour and MTrain Tour, 2016's the Untouchable Tour, and 2024's the Timeless Tour.

== Background ==
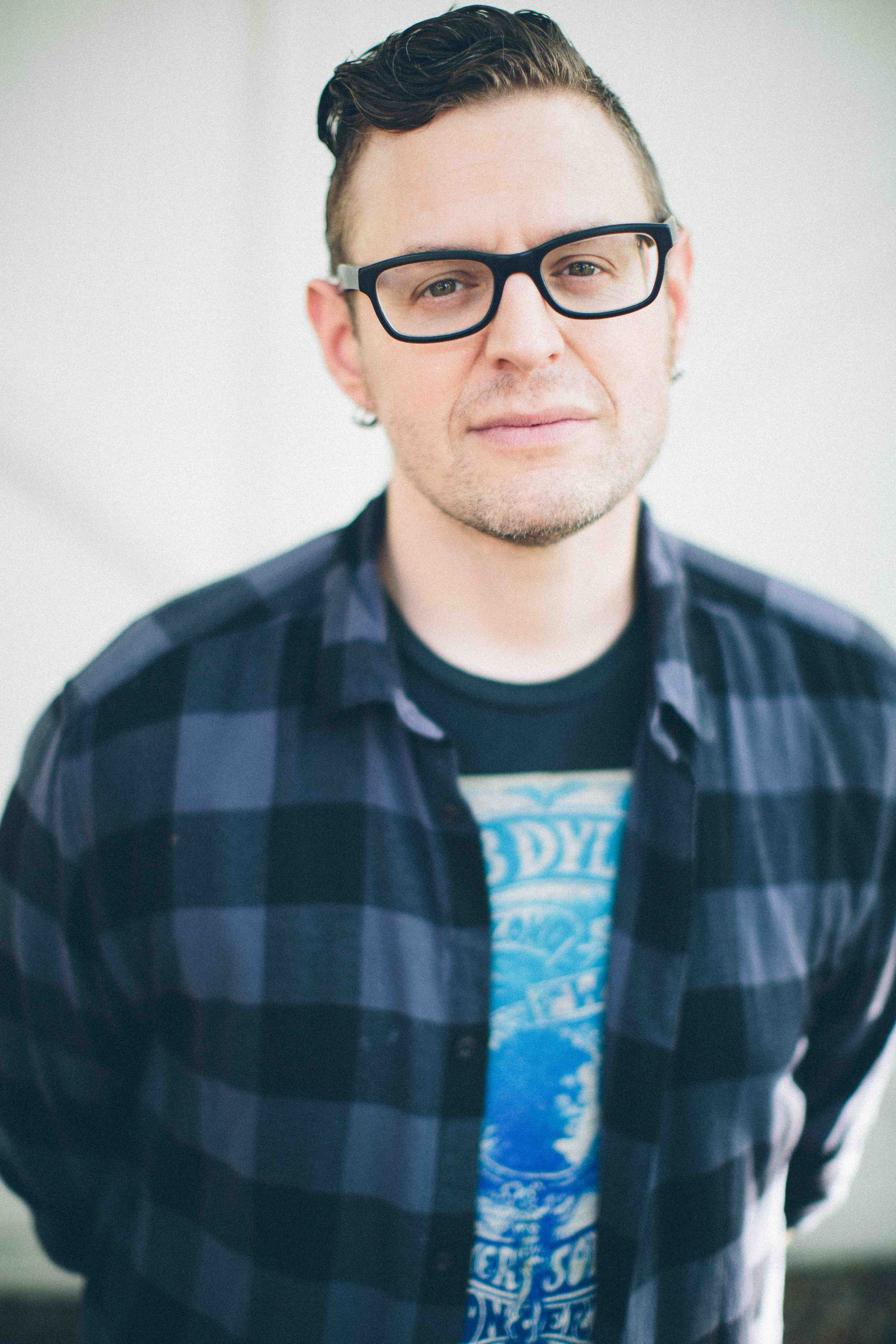
Kevin Kadish produced and co-wrote "Lips Are Movin".

American songwriter Kevin Kadish met Meghan Trainor in June 2013 at the request of Carla Wallace, the co-owner of Trainor's publishing firm Big Yellow Dog Music. Kadish liked Trainor's voice and booked a writing session with her. They subsequently co-wrote the song "All About That Bass" in November 2013 and pitched it to different record labels, all of which turned it down due to its doo-wop pop production as synth-pop was more popular at the time. L.A. Reid, the chairman of Epic Records, heard it and encouraged Trainor to record it herself. She signed with the label in 2014 and released it as her debut single in June that year. The song reached number 1 in 58 countries and sold 11 million units worldwide.

Following the success of "All About That Bass", Trainor's A&R suggested that she and Kadish write more songs together. Kadish produced eight tracks for her debut major-label studio album Title (2015), and co-wrote seven of them, including "Lips Are Movin". (Note: Though Trainor independently released three acoustic albums between 2009 and 2011, Title is widely reported to be her debut studio album.) Following the album's initial completion, the two had an additional day to work together and went into the studio. Trainor overheard the instrumental track for "Lips Are Movin" through Kadish's headphone box and insisted they write it that day. Trainor started singing the song's verse after Kadish came up with the line "I know you're lying, your lips are moving", and they finished writing it within eight minutes. After hearing the track, L.A. Reid told Kadish about his plans to shelve "Title" as Trainor's planned second single, and release "Lips Are Movin" instead. In a 2014 interview, he spoke fondly about writing with Trainor: "It's almost like we share a brain musically when we're writing a song. I've never had that with anyone before."

== Composition and lyrics ==
"Lips Are Movin" (2014)
An 18-second sample of the introduction of "Lips Are Movin", where Trainor sings the titular line over retro-tinged production which makes use of handclaps.

"Lips Are Movin" is 3:01 in length. Kadish produced, engineered, and mixed the song at the Carriage House studio in Nolensville, Tennessee. He plays the acoustic bass, baritone saxophone, drums, guitar, and piano, and David Baron plays the organ. The track was mastered by Dave Kutch at the Mastering Palace in New York.

Trainor told The Tennessean that the musical composition of "Lips Are Movin" and "All About That Bass" follows the same formula, which Slant Magazine's Alexa Camp described as "doo-wop throwback, girl-group harmonies, bubblegum pop hooks". "Lips Are Movin" is a retro-tinged doo-wop and pop song, with production that makes use of handclaps, and a post-chorus chant reminiscent of the latter. The lyrics, too, reference it with the line, "I gave you bass/You gave me sweet talk." Trainor assumes a Southern-inflected patois while singing over the song's saxophone bleats. AllMusic's Stephen Thomas Erlewine described it as Motown bounce.

Kadish stated that the lyrics of "Lips Are Movin" were inspired by Trainor's frustrations with her record label. However, reviewers, including The Tennessean's Dave Paulson and MTV News' Christina Garibaldi, deemed it a track about leaving a significant other after being cheated on, an interpretation Kadish is open to.

== Release ==
MTV News reported the song "Title" (2014) would be released as Trainor's second single, in September 2014. Kadish went to New York to meet with Reid and voiced his regret about not having "Lips Are Movin" ready in time for the release of Trainor's debut extended play Title that month, and its potential release as the follow-up single. Reid announced during the meeting that he was going with it as the second single and scrapping "Title", and was quoted by Kadish as saying, "I think this song will do better."

On October 14, 2014, "Lips Are Movin" was briefly available to stream on mobile application Shazam, and premiered along with its artwork on MTV News the following day. Epic Records released the song to contemporary hit radio in the United States on October 21, and for digital download in various countries. British radio station BBC Radio 1 added it to rotation on December 26, 2014, and the record label sent it to radio stations in Italy on January 16, 2015. In the UK, "Lips Are Movin" was made available to those who pre-ordered Title, with its digital release as a single being held back until January 18. Sony Music released a CD single exclusively for sale by United States retailer Best Buy on December 30, 2014, and in Germany on February 13, 2015.

== Critical reception ==
"Lips Are Movin" received widespread comparisons to "All About That Bass" from music critics. Mikael Wood of the Los Angeles Times considered it one of Title's dozen versions of the latter, which he found as cheerful but also as annoying. Writing for Clash, Alice Levine remarked that the songs have the same "factory-produced sass" and theme of false feminism and empowerment, but being done a second time decreased its novelty. The Boston Globe's Marc Hirsh derided "Lips Are Movin" for following the formula of "All About That Bass", writing that Trainor is a plunderer and "steals from herself" with the song. Spin's Dan Weiss criticized the lyrics and compared them to the age-old joke about lawyers being liars. Toronto Star's Ben Rayner wrote that it is "whitewashed into a fairly anodyne mush", and declared that its "hip-hop bump and plush bassline" are "pure cosmetic window dressing". He considered them an attempt to make Trainor's "old-timey aesthetic" feel contemporary.

Other reviewers were positive of "Lips Are Movin". Billboard's Carl Wilson complimented the lyrics, saying that they proved Trainor had "more going on than a topical trifle", but concluded that the song was risking "coming off as 'Bass, Part 2". Brian Mansfield of USA Today called "Lips Are Movin" the "better record" of the two. Garibaldi described it as an up-beat and catchy "ladies anthem", and a Billboard critic stated that the "upbeat and sassy" song's similarities with "All About That Bass" would lead to "great things" for it. In a favorable review, Andrew Hampp from the same magazine said that "Lips Are Movin" helped solidify Trainor "as the self-proclaimed queen of her own genre, 'she-wop'". Erlewine declared it the best song on the album and wrote that it would help the listener accept Trainor's "pastiche and performance" skills, and Chicago Tribune's Matt Pais considered it a showcase of Trainor's "versatility, confidence, vulnerability and smartness".

== Chart performance ==
"Lips Are Movin" debuted at number 93 on the US Billboard Hot 100 issued for November 8, 2014. On December 10, 2014, the song moved from number 13 to number 8 and became Trainor's second consecutive top-10 entry, selling 110,000 digital downloads and earning 7.8 million streams. It peaked at number 4 in its eighth week on the chart, receiving 116,000 sales and 8 million streams during the tracking week. This made Trainor the fifth female artist in Billboard Hot 100 chart history to follow her debut number-one single directly with a second top-five. The Recording Industry Association of America (RIAA) certified the single 4× Platinum, which denotes four million units based on sales and track-equivalent on-demand streams. On the Canadian Hot 100, "Lips Are Movin" peaked at number 7 and was certified 4× Platinum by Music Canada.

The song debuted at number 89 on the UK Singles Chart issued for December 21, 2014. Following its digital release as a single in the United Kingdom, it rose from number 50 to its peak of number 2 on January 25, 2015. The British Phonographic Industry (BPI) certified "Lips Are Movin" Platinum. In Germany, the song reached number 10 and was certified Gold. It peaked at number 3 in Australia and was certified 5× Platinum in 2023. In New Zealand, the track peaked at number 5 and was certified double platinum. Elsewhere, "Lips Are Movin" charted within the top 10 of national record charts – at number 2 in Scotland and Venezuela, number 3 in Czech Republic and Poland, number 4 in Slovakia, number 5 in Ireland, Slovenia, and Spain, number 6 in Austria, and number 10 in the Netherlands and South Africa. The song additionally made the top 30, at number 18 in Hungary and Switzerland, number 22 in Norway, number 23 in Denmark, and number 28 in Sweden. It received a Double Platinum certification in Sweden, Platinum in Mexico and Spain, and Gold in Denmark and Italy.

== Music video ==
=== Background and concept ===
Philip Andelman directed the music video for "Lips Are Movin", which was filmed in Los Angeles, California. It premiered on Trainor's Vevo account on November 19, 2014. Information technology corporation Hewlett-Packard (HP) commissioned the video, which features appearances by social media influencers—actors, dancers and set designers with large social media followings. It is the first-ever music video to be created solely by Vine, Instagram and YouTube stars.

Trainor wanted to create something as "big and fun" as the music video for "All About That Bass", and did not want the video to just feature her yelling at a male love interest. Hewlett-Packard and ad agency 180LA had been contacting record labels, wanting to help create a music video as part of the promotional campaign for the former's newly launched Pavilion x360 laptop, when they thought of Trainor. A creative director for 180LA told Adweek that they picked Trainor as her music would suit a "fun, high-energy campaign" and she had the potential to inspire the influencers' followers. HP and Trainor picked out the influencers, which include American YouTuber Liza Koshy, French dancers Les Twins, and American dancer Chachi Gonzales. Trainor described the concept of the video in an interview with MTV News: "Here's me being sassy and other people dancing with me and having just a good time and trying to get through this feeling of, Ugh he's cheating on me again". She said she was excited about it and concluded "it still feels very 'Meghan Trainor,' which is amazing!".

The video depicts behind-the-scenes events of a music video shoot. The x360 laptop appears frequently in the music video as a product placement, beginning with its use as a digital clapperboard in the opening scene.

=== Synopsis ===
The music video for "Lips Are Movin" featured appearances by social media influencers. Yahoo! Music writer Lyndsey Parker compared the large pair of lips in the backdrop to those in a poster for The Rocky Horror Picture Show.

In the music video, Trainor, in a black leather jacket, sings in front of a pastel blue backdrop. She performs choreography with the influencers in subsequent scenes, on vibrant studio sets of bright colors. The meta concept of the visuals also depicts Trainor getting her makeup done and choosing wardrobe. Lips are used as a motif throughout the video; they appear as close-ups of Trainor's mouth, lip-shaped earrings and sunglasses, and as a large drawing in the backdrop, the latter of which Yahoo! Music writer Lyndsey Parker compared to those in a poster for The Rocky Horror Picture Show. Trainor is later seen lying on a lip-shaped sofa. One of Trainor's outfits include a bubblegum-colored dress with two cat faces on it, which Mike Pell of MTV UK compared to the top Katy Perry wore at the 2014 MTV Europe Music Awards.

=== Reception ===
The music video's release reportedly boosted Trainor's social media presence, including an 11% surge in Twitter followers, 16% on Facebook, 41.3% on Instagram, and an almost 100% increase on Vine. Hampp said that in being the first-ever music video created entirely by social media influencers, its production was a "historic milestone in the realm of YouTube creators". James Cowan of Canadian Business believed that some could see Hewlett-Packard's involvement as a dull brand trying to appear modish by attaching itself to influencers, but a more enthusiastic viewer may call it "arts patronage for the 21st century", and noted that the sponsorship is so limited that no one would notice it without searching.

Pell called it a thematic continuation of the "All About That Bass" video, due to the bright and ebullient sets featured in both clips. Fuse's Hilary Hughes wrote that the "Lips Are Movin" music video offered a bolder look for Trainor, which constituted a style shift from the latter and "definitely made a statement", but retained its "cheekiness and big-eyed adorable vibes". Parker wrote that Trainor's cat outfit was a "fashion statement" that was bound to get attention, and remarked that the excessive use of lips as a motif could be seen as Trainor's informal campaign for a M.A.C. Viva Glam endorsement deal.

== Live performances ==
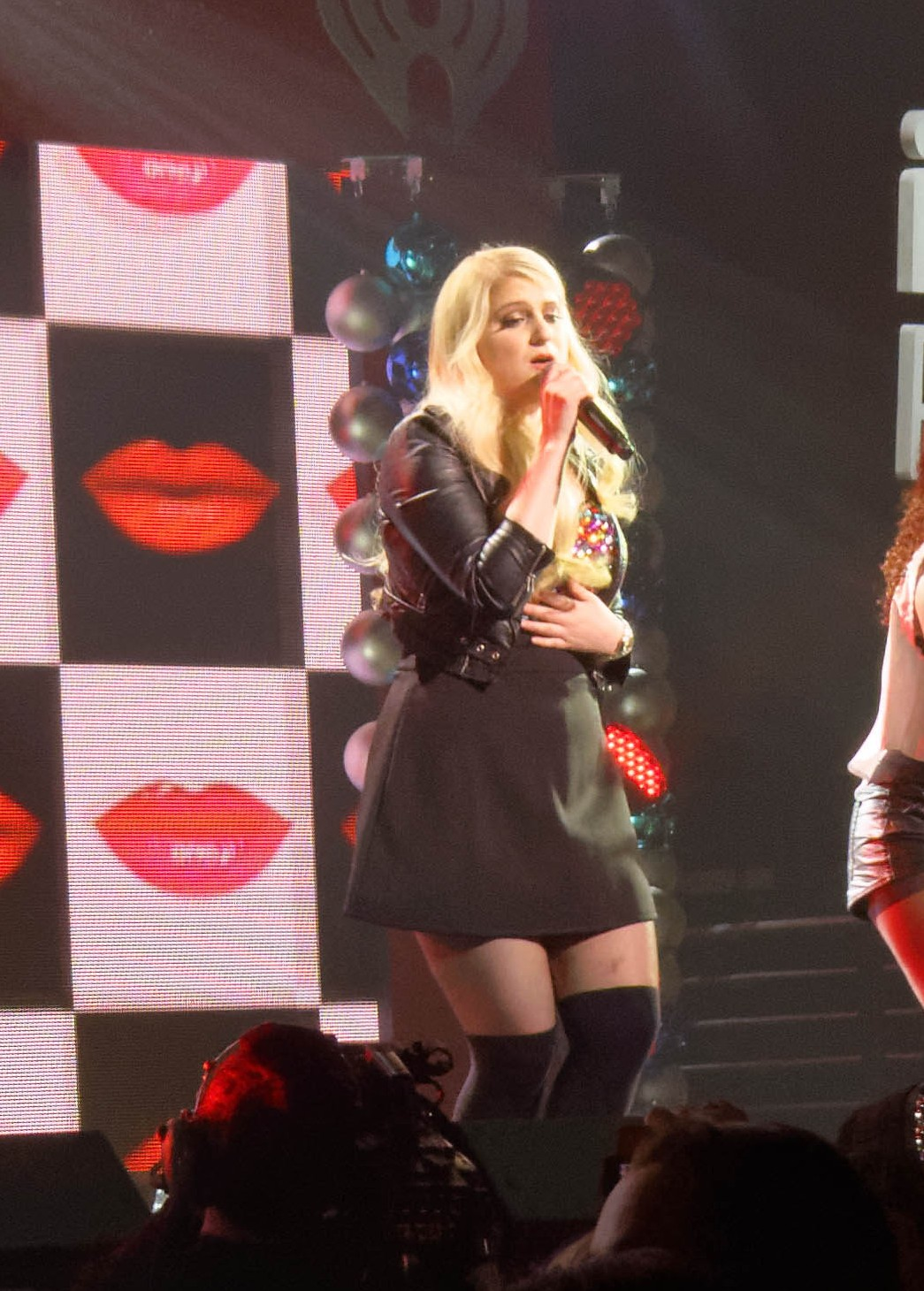
Trainor performing "Lips Are Movin" on the Jingle Ball Tour on December 10, 2014.

Trainor performed "Lips Are Movin" live on NBC's Today on November 5, 2014, where she gave an interview and received a plaque. On November 27, she performed the song at the Macy's Thanksgiving Day Parade on a GoldieBlox float. Trainor performed it on the finale of The Voice's seventh season on December 16. She performed a medley of "Lips Are Movin" and "All About That Bass" on the season 19 finale of America's Dancing with the Stars. Trainor performed an acoustic version of the former song on The Tonight Show Starring Jimmy Fallon on January 15, 2015, during which she played the guitar. She performed it during Today's 2015 Toyota Concert Series as well as their 2016 Citi Concert Series.

A live rendition of "Lips Are Movin" appeared on BBC Radio 1's Live Lounge 2015. Trainor included the song in her set list for the Jingle Ball Tour 2014, the 2015 Summertime Ball, her That Bass and MTrain Tours, the Untouchable Tour (2016), Capital's Summertime Ball 2024, and the Timeless Tour (2024). She performed it while headlining the Philadelphia Welcome America Festival as part of the 2019 Fourth of July celebrations.

== Credits and personnel ==
Credits adapted from the liner notes of Title

=== Recording locations ===
- Recorded, engineered, and mixed at The Carriage House, Nolensville, Tennessee
- Mastered at The Mastering Palace (New York)

=== Personnel ===
- Kevin Kadish – producer, songwriter, engineer, acoustic bass, baritone saxophone, drums, guitar, mixing, piano
- Meghan Trainor – songwriter
- David Baron – organ
- Dave Kutch – mastering

== Charts ==
=== Weekly charts ===
Weekly chart positions for "Lips Are Movin"
Chart (2014–2015)	Peak position
Australia (ARIA)	3
Austria (Ö3 Austria Top 40)	6
Belgium (Ultratop 50 Flanders)	33
Belgium (Ultratip Bubbling Under Wallonia)	3
Canada Hot 100 (Billboard)	7
Canada AC (Billboard)	5
Canada CHR/Top 40 (Billboard)	6
Canada Hot AC (Billboard)	4
Czech Republic Airplay (ČNS IFPI)	3
Czech Republic Singles Digital (ČNS IFPI)	7
Denmark (Tracklisten)	23
Finland Airplay (Radiosoittolista)	21
Euro Digital Song Sales (Billboard)	3
France (SNEP)	154
Germany (GfK)	10
Germany Airplay (BVMI)	1
Hungary (Rádiós Top 40)	2
Hungary (Single Top 40)	18
Hungary (Stream Top 40)	13
Ireland (IRMA)	5
Italy (Musica e Dischi)	46
Japan Hot 100 (Billboard)	60
Mexico (Billboard Mexican Airplay)	12
Mexico Anglo (Monitor Latino)	6
Netherlands (Dutch Top 40)	10
Netherlands (Single Top 100)	14
New Zealand (Recorded Music NZ)	5
Norway (VG-lista)	22
Poland Airplay (ZPAV)	3
Scottish Singles Sales (Official Charts)	2
Slovakia Airplay (ČNS IFPI)	4
Slovakia Singles Digital (ČNS IFPI)	11
Slovenia (SloTop50)	5
South Africa Airplay (EMA)	10
Spain (Promusicae)	5
Sweden (Sverigetopplistan)	28
Switzerland (Schweizer Hitparade)	18
UK Singles (Official Charts)	2
US Billboard Hot 100	4
US Adult Contemporary (Billboard)	5
US Adult Pop Airplay (Billboard)	3
US Dance Airplay (Billboard)	12
US Latin Pop Airplay (Billboard)	36
US Pop Airplay (Billboard)	4
US Rhythmic Airplay (Billboard)	34
Venezuela (Record Report)	68
Venezuela (Top Pop General)	14
Venezuela (Top Anglo)	2

=== Year-end charts ===
2014 year-end chart position for "Lips Are Movin"
Chart (2014)	Position
Australia (ARIA)	64

2015 year-end chart positions for "Lips Are Movin"
Chart (2015)	Position
Australia (ARIA)	82
Austria (Ö3 Austria Top 40)	66
Canada (Canadian Hot 100)	34
Germany (Official German Charts)	68
Hungary (Rádiós Top 40)	33
Netherlands (Dutch Top 40)	55
Netherlands (Single Top 100)	97
Poland (ZPAV)	39
Slovenia (SloTop50)	10
Spain (PROMUSICAE)	75
UK Singles (Official Charts Company)	73
US Billboard Hot 100	22
US Adult Contemporary (Billboard)	12
US Adult Top 40 (Billboard)	21
US Mainstream Top 40 (Billboard)	31

2016 year-end chart position for "Lips Are Movin"
Chart (2016)	Position
Hungary (Rádiós Top 40)	93

== Certifications ==
Certifications for "Lips Are Movin"
Region	Certification	Certified units/sales
Australia (ARIA)	5× Platinum	350,000^{‡}
Brazil (Pro-Música Brasil)	3× Platinum	180,000^{‡}
Canada (Music Canada)	4× Platinum	320,000^{‡}
Denmark (IFPI Danmark)	Gold	30,000^{^}
Germany (BVMI)	Gold	200,000^{‡}
Italy (FIMI)	Gold	25,000^{‡}
Mexico (AMPROFON)	Platinum	60,000^{*}
New Zealand (RMNZ)	2× Platinum	30,000^{*}
Spain (Promusicae)	Platinum	40,000^{‡}
Sweden (GLF)	2× Platinum	80,000^{‡}
United Kingdom (BPI)	Platinum	600,000^{‡}
United States (RIAA)	4× Platinum	4,000,000^{‡}
^{*} Sales figures based on certification alone.^{^} Shipments figures based on certification alone.^{‡} Sales+streaming figures based on certification alone.

== Release history ==
Release dates and format(s) for "Lips Are Movin"
Country	Date	Format	Label
Austria	October 21, 2014	Digital download	Epic
Germany	October 21, 2014	Digital download	Epic
Switzerland	October 21, 2014	Digital download	Epic
United States	October 21, 2014	Contemporary hit radio	Epic
United Kingdom	December 26, 2014	Contemporary hit radio	Epic
United States	December 30, 2014	CD single	Sony
Italy	January 16, 2015	Radio airplay	Epic
United Kingdom	January 18, 2015	Digital download	Epic
Germany	February 13, 2015	CD single	Sony

== See also ==
- List of Billboard Hot 100 top 10 singles in 2014
