= That Bass Tour =

2015 concert tour by Meghan Trainor

- Tour by Meghan Trainor
- Poster of the tour
- Associated album: Title
- Start date: February 11, 2015
- End date: June 4, 2015
- No. of shows: 36

Meghan Trainor concert chronology
- That Bass Tour (2015); MTrain Tour (2015)

That Bass Tour was the first headlining concert tour by American singer-songwriter Meghan Trainor. It was launched in support of her debut major-label studio album Title (2015), and visited North America, Europe, Asia, and Oceania. The tour was initially announced in November 2014 with North American dates being released at the same time, with Oceanic, European and Asian dates announced afterward. The show was produced by Live Nation Entertainment. The set list featured the majority of the songs from Title, along with a cover of Mark Ronson's "Uptown Funk". Reviews for the tour were generally positive, with critics praising Trainor's prowess performing live.

== Background and development ==
On November 3, 2014, Trainor announced her debut concert tour, That Bass Tour, to support her fourth studio album and major label debut, Title (2015). Tour dates were released on the same day for North America, and tickets were released on November 8, 2014. Dates were also revealed for the United Kingdom and Australia in January 2015. Live Nation Entertainment were announced to be the tour's producers, and HP as its sponsor. The set list included fourteen songs from Trainor's album Title along with a dance section featuring Mark Ronson's "Uptown Funk".

== Synopsis ==
The show starts with a screen of lights in the background while Trainor enters the stage, and she then opens with "Dear Future Husband". After performing another three songs, Trainor starts singing "Title" with only a ukulele and her guitarist. "Bang Dem Sticks" is later performed along with a drum solo, which is followed by a special dance segment, as a tribute to Mark Ronson's song "Uptown Funk" featuring Bruno Mars. As the first song of the encore, she sings "What If I" which was accompanied by a disco ball. The show closes with "All About That Bass", which Bill Brotherton of the Boston Herald said had "a loud sing-along and had moms, dads and preteens dancing feverishly". The show ends with large balloons and confetti falling from the ceiling.

== Critical reception ==
Carlee Wright of USA Today praised the show, saying that Trainor was energetic during the show, and that she interacted with the crowd often, both between and during songs. She also said that Trainor "brought her A-game" for the show and that she recommends buying tickets for the show. Annabel Ross from The Sydney Morning Herald rated the song three out of five stars, and described Trainor as a "pop star for all the family" in the review. The Hollywood Reporter's Ashley Lee said that the show did not disappoint the crowd, and also praised Trainor's vocals and her showmanship. David Pollock of The Independent praised the show and opined that it is "positively rich in visual spectacle and a sense of authentically live performance". International Business Times's Alicia Adejobi criticized Trainor's dance routines in the "Uptown Funk" segment, saying that she's not the "best dancer".

Portland Tribune's Nicole DeCosta said Trainor described Trainor as laid back and her dance moves as "G-rated", although Owen R. Smith from The Seattle Times said that the lyrical subjects of the songs on the show's set list did not fit its young audience. Ashley Lee from The Hollywood Reporter said that the show's venue was "intima[te]", and that Trainor took advantage of this. John Aizlewood of the London Evening Standard wrote that Trainor had a "natural presence" in the show and that she "spread more than a little happiness".

== Set list ==
Set list for the March 13, 2015, show.

1. "Dear Future Husband"
2. "Mr. Almost"
3. "Credit"
4. "No Good for You"
5. "Title"
6. "Walkashame"
7. "Queen"
8. "Close Your Eyes"
9. "3am"
10. "Like I'm Gonna Lose You"
11. "Bang Dem Sticks"
12. "Uptown Funk"
13. "My Selfish Heart"
14. "Lips Are Movin"
  Encore
14. "What If I"
15. "All About That Bass"

== Shows ==
List of concerts, showing date, city, country, venue, and opening act(s)
Date (2015)	City	Country	Venue	Opening act(s)
February 11	Vancouver	Canada	Vogue Theatre	Sheppard
February 13	Portland	United States	Wonder Ballroom	Sheppard; Matt Prince
February 14	Seattle	United States	Neptune Theatre	Sheppard; Matt Prince
February 16	San Francisco	United States	The Fillmore	Sheppard; Matt Prince
February 18	San Diego	United States	House of Blues	Sheppard; Matt Prince
February 21	Los Angeles	United States	El Rey Theatre	Sheppard; Matt Prince
February 22	Los Angeles	United States	El Rey Theatre	Sheppard; Matt Prince
February 25	Houston	United States	House of Blues	Sheppard; Matt Prince
February 27	Dallas	United States	Granada Theater	Sheppard; Matt Prince
March 1	Louisville	United States	Mercury Ballroom	Sheppard; Matt Prince
March 2	Detroit	United States	Saint Andrew's Hall	Sheppard; Matt Prince
March 4	Chicago	United States	House of Blues	Sheppard; Matt Prince
March 6	Toronto	Canada	Phoenix Concert Theatre	Sheppard; Matt Prince
March 8	Silver Spring	United States	The Fillmore Silver Spring	Sheppard; Matt Prince
March 11	Philadelphia	United States	Theatre of Living Arts	Sheppard; Matt Prince
March 13	New York City	United States	Irving Plaza	Sheppard; Matt Prince
March 15	New York City	United States	Irving Plaza	Sheppard; Matt Prince
March 17	Boston	United States	Paradise Rock Club	Sheppard; Matt Prince
March 20	Nashville	United States	Cannery Ballroom	Matt Prince
April 9	Manchester	England	The Ritz	Olivia Somerlyn
April 10	Glasgow	Scotland	O_{2} ABC	Olivia Somerlyn
April 11	Birmingham	England	O_{2} Institute	Olivia Somerlyn
April 13	London	England	O_{2} Shepherd's Bush Empire	Olivia Somerlyn
April 18	Tokyo	Japan	Laforet Museum	—N/a
April 23	Sentosa	Singapore	The Coliseum	—N/a
April 27	Sydney	Australia	Big Top	G.R.L.
April 30	Melbourne	Australia	Forum Theatre	G.R.L.
May 8 (Note: The May 8, 2015, show is part of the Channel 933 Summer Kickoff 2015 at the Sleep Train Amphitheatre.)	Chula Vista	United States	Sleep Train Amphitheatre	—N/a
May 9 (Note: The May 9, 2015, show is part of the Wango Tango 2015 at the StubHub Center)	Carson	United States	StubHub Center	—N/a
May 26	Copenhagen	Denmark	Vega	Olivia Somerlyn
May 28	Paris	France	Le Trianon	Olivia Somerlyn
May 29	Amsterdam	Netherlands	Paradiso	Olivia Somerlyn
May 30 (Note: The May 30, 2015, show is part of the N-JOY Starshow at the Expo Park)	Hanover	Germany	Expo Park	Olivia Somerlyn
June 1	Hamburg	Germany	Große Freiheit 36	Olivia Somerlyn
June 2	Cologne	Germany	Live Music Hall	Olivia Somerlyn
June 4	Milan	Italy	Fabrique	Olivia Somerlyn

=== Box score office data ===
List of concerts, showing date, city, country, venue, attendance and gross revenue
Date (2015)	City	Country	Venue	Attendance (tickets sold / available)	Revenue
February 21	Los Angeles	United States	El Rey Theatre	1,542 / 1,542	$38,500
February 22	Los Angeles	United States	El Rey Theatre	1,542 / 1,542	$38,500
