= Kevin Kadish =

American songwriter and record producer (born 1971)

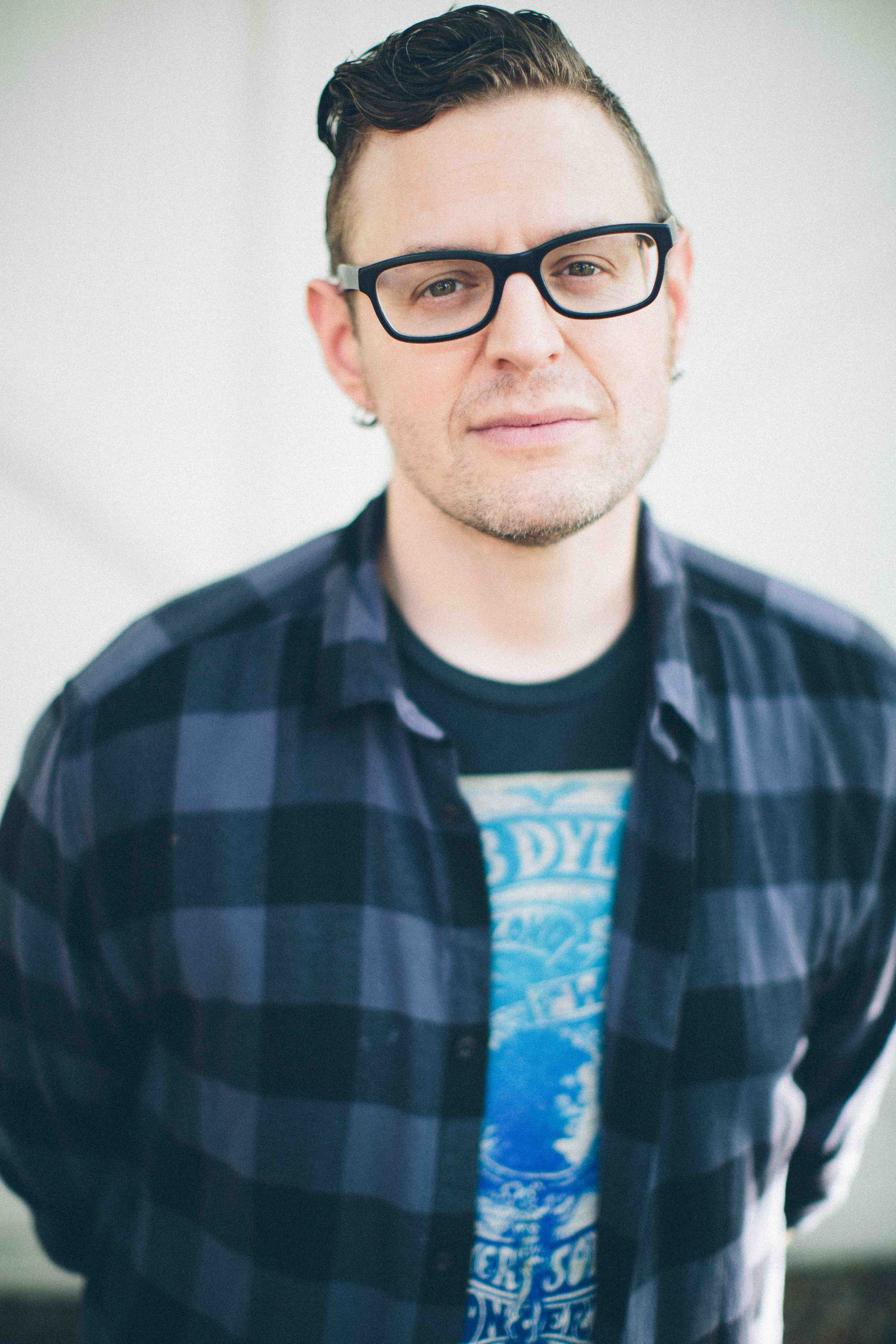

Background information
- Birth name: Kevin Paul Kadish
- Born: 1971 or 1972 (age 53–54); Baltimore, Maryland, U.S.
- Genres: Pop; rock; R&B; dance; CCM; country
- Occupations: Songwriter; producer; sound engineer; instrumentalist

Kevin Paul Kadish (born 1971) is an American songwriter and record producer. He co-wrote, produced, and mixed the 2014 Diamond certified (10× platinum) single "All About That Bass" by Meghan Trainor which spent eight weeks at No. 1 on the Billboard Hot 100. In 2018, the song was named the 67th Biggest Hot100 Hit of All-Time, by Billboard, seated between The J. Geils Band's "Centerfold" (66) and John Lennon's "(Just Like) Starting Over" (68). The song received two nominations at the 57th Grammy Awards: Record of the Year and Song of the Year.

== Early life ==
Born and raised in Baltimore, Kadish began playing guitar at the age of 13. After graduating from Owings Mills High School, he attended Berklee College of Music and studied Film Scoring. In 1991, Kadish transferred from Berklee to the University of Maryland, College Park where he designed his own major, Music Management, through the Individual Studies Department. He graduated in 1993 with a B.S. in Music Management.

== Career ==
Throughout the mid-1990s, Kadish toured the East Coast as a solo, acoustic artist, opening for Hall & Oates, Vertical Horizon, Dave Matthews Band, Jeff Beck, SR-71, Marcy Playground, Everything, and others.

In 1998, Kadish signed a development deal with Republic Records as a solo recording artist. He recorded with the producer Steve Addabbo at his Shelter Island Sound recording studio in New York City but no album was ever released.

In 2000, Kadish met record producer Matt Serletic who signed him as his "staff-writer" to Serletic's co-venture with Warner/Chappell Music. While under the wing of Serletic, Kadish co-wrote "Be There For You" and "Don't Fade Away" on Willie Nelson's album The Great Divide. He also co-wrote the songs "(There's Gotta Be) More to Life" and "Stuck" for Christian pop singer Stacie Orrico which appeared in the television shows The Simple Life and That's So Raven, as well as the animated film Robots. These two hits have been featured on several compilations which have sold nearly 11 million copies, cumulatively. In 2005, Kadish received an ASCAP Christian Music Award for Stacie Orrico's "(There's Gotta Be) More To Life" for being one of the most played songs on Christian radio.

Also in 2005, Kadish collaborated with singer/songwriter Jason Mraz on his sophomore album, Mr. A-Z, producing and writing both singles ("Wordplay" and "Geek in the Pink") For his work on this record, Kadish was nominated for Best Engineered Album at the 48th Grammy Awards in 2005.

In 2006, Kadish received the SOCAN award for his No.1 "Flawed Design" by Stabilo. In 2007, the song also received the SOCAN award for greatest number of plays on Canadian radio in 2006.

From 2007 to 2011, Kadish worked on and wrote on records with Gloriana, Miley Cyrus, Meat Loaf and Victoria Justice.

In 2012, Kevin co-wrote and produced "Crazy For You" with Ross Lynch, "Rooftops" with American Idol winner Kris Allen.

In September 2013, Kadish co-wrote "All About That Bass" with Meghan Trainor. The song became the third best-selling song of 2014, and was also the 14th most-viewed YouTube video ever, with more than 2.5 billion views. However, in September 2015, Kadish claimed to have earned just $5,679 as a result of the song being streamed to 178 million people, telling a meeting arranged by the U.S. House Committee on the Judiciary: "That's as big a song as a songwriter can have in their career and number one in 78 countries. But you're making $5,600. How do you feed your family?"

In 2015, Kadish worked with artists such as Garth Brooks, Daniel Powter, Miranda Lambert, O.A.R., A Great Big World, Jennifer Lopez, Fifth Harmony, Steven Tyler (Aerosmith), and others.

In 2016, Kadish partnered with producer and songwriter Nathan Chapman (Taylor Swift, Keith Urban, Lady Antebellum, etc.) to form an artist development company, Starts With Music. In 2018, the company's first sign with Brynn Elliott, signed to Atlantic Records, and her first single "Might Not Like Me" had enormous success at radio. The company has also signed country artist Jake Rose who is currently on tour across the country with various country acts.

In 2016, Kadish and collaborator Ben Burgess co-wrote "Whiskey Glasses" for up and coming country artist Morgan Wallen, which launched Wallen to superstardom. In 2019, it was the most played song on Country radio according to Billboard (magazine) after spending more than 20 weeks in the top 10. It is estimated that the song will receive a Diamond Certification (10,000,000 units in the US) by the end of 2023. This would be the second song Kadish has penned to reach this milestone.

More recently, Kadish co-wrote the certified platinum "Soul" for Country star Lee Brice, "Drinkin' It Wrong" for country singer Adam Doleac and has been developing singer/songwriter Sierra Carson with longtime collaborator David Baron.

Other songwriting credits include work with and for Michelle Branch (Warner Bros.), Taylor Hicks (Arista), Joe Jonas (Hollywood), Skillet (Lava/Atlantic), BC Jean (J Records), Tal Bachman (Sony), Bif Naked (Lava/Atlantic), Lucy Woodward (Atlantic), Evan Taubenfeld (Sire/Warner Bros.), Nikki Sixx (Mötley Crüe), Steve Perry, Kris Allen (Jive Records), Billy Currington (Mercury Nashville Records), Canaan Smith (Universal Nashville), Plain White T's, Colt Ford, Muni Long, Ben Burgess, Brian Kelley from the band FGL, etc.

== Singles ==
- "Whiskey Glasses" – Morgan Wallen
- "All About That Bass" – Meghan Trainor
- "Lips Are Movin" – Meghan Trainor
- "Dear Future Husband" - Meghan Trainor
- "Stuck" – Stacie Orrico
- "(There's Gotta Be) More to Life" – Stacie Orrico
- "Wordplay" – Jason Mraz
- "Geek in the Pink" – Jason Mraz
- "Bring on the Love" – Coldwater Jane
- "Dumb Girls" – Lucy Woodward
- "Let Down" – Bif Naked
- "Open Wounds" – Skillet
- "Flawed Design" – Stabilo
- "Who We Are" – Hope Partlow
- "Pumpkin Pie" – Evan Taubenfeld
- "Cheater of the Year" – Evan Taubenfeld
- "The Real" – Nevertheless
- "Live Like We're Alive"- Nevertheless
- "Stand Up" – Fireflight
- "Try Try Try" – Michael Squire
- "Best Years of Our Lives" – Evan T. & Avril Lavigne
- "Take A Hint" – Victorious Cast (feat. Victoria Justice & Elizabeth Gillies) – (Nickelodeon/Sony) – writer
- "Spite" – Charm City Devils – (ILG/Warner Bros.) – writer
- "Start It Up" – Charm City Devils – (ILG/Warner Bros.) – writer
- "Where's the Party" by Jenilee Reyes (From "Shake It Up: Live 2 Dance") – (Disney) – writer and producer

== Notable collaborations ==
Kadish has collaborated with the following artists/songwriters:

- Meghan Trainor
- Jason Mraz
- Kris Allen
- Kara DioGuardi
- Lindy Robbins
- Ben Burgess
- Mitch Allan
- Bleu
- Angie Aparo

== Past projects ==
Kadish co-wrote and produced "Rich Kids" for the band New Medicine's debut album Race You to the Bottom, released September 28, 2010, on PhotoFinish/Atlantic.

He contributed acoustic guitars and backing vocals, and co-wrote the Miley Cyrus song "Two More Lonely People" for her album Can't Be Tamed.

He also co-wrote "Narcissistic Boiz" on the 2011 J Records release from artist BC Jean.

Kadish's wife, Brandon Jane, is one-half of the duo Coldwater Jane. Kadish co-wrote and produced songs on their album Marionette.

Kevin co-wrote and produced the song "Try Try Try" for Universal Germany artist Michael Squire. Kadish co-wrote this song with Jason Mraz for the album We Sing. We Dance. We Steal Things., but it was not used on Mraz's album. "Try Try Try" was the first single from Squire's upcoming debut album Your Love Grows in the Sunshine. Kadish also produced the follow-up single for Squire, "Gimme Feeling".

He co-wrote and produced "End of the World" for A Great Big World's second album When the Morning Comes, released November 13, 2015.
