= Vocal cord hemorrhage =

Medical condition

Vocal cord hemorrhage occurs when a blood vessel in the vocal cords ruptures, which results in leakage of blood into the superficial lamina propria and dysphonia (hoarseness). The rupture usually results from overly forceful or incorrect vocalization, and may be a one-time occurrence or occur repeatedly. According to News Medical.net, "professional singers are at an increased risk of vocal hemorrhage, particularly in cases where gruelling performance schedules are followed". The treatment is vocal rest as failure to rest the voice can result in permanent scarring.
