= Jingle Ball Tour 2014 =

2014 concert tour

- Tour by Various Artists
- Start date: December 5, 2014
- End date: December 22, 2014
- Legs: 1
- No. of shows: 9 in United States
- Box office: $14.9 million

Various Artists concert chronology
- Jingle Ball Tour 2013 (2013); Jingle Ball Tour 2014 (2014); Jingle Ball Tour 2015 (2015)

The iHeartRadio Jingle Ball Tour 2014 was a national holiday tour by iHeartMedia that began on December 5, 2014, in Los Angeles at the Staples Center hosted by Ryan Seacrest and special guest host Nick Jonas. The tour celebrates the holiday season and captures the holiday spirit of the iHeartRadio app, with performances by some of the year's biggest recording artists. The tour ended on December 22, 2014, in Tampa at the Amalie Arena (formerly known as Tampa Bay Times Forum). It is the highest grossing Jingle Ball Tour of all time.

Z100's Jingle Ball in New York was streamed on Yahoo Live for fans nationwide and broadcast live on iHeartMedia Contemporary Hit Radio (CHR) stations across the country on Friday, December 12, 2014. The event also aired nationwide as a two-hour special on The CW Network on Thursday, December 18, 2014.

== Performers ==
- Iggy Azalea (Los Angeles, Saint Paul, Philadelphia, New York City, Boston, Washington, DC, Rosemont, Sunrise)
- Jason Derulo (Washington, DC, Sunrise, Tampa)
- Fall Out Boy (Rosemont, Tampa)
- Becky G (Los Angeles, Saint Paul, Rosemont, Sunrise)
- Ariana Grande (Los Angeles, Saint Paul, Philadelphia, New York City, Washington, DC, Sunrise)
- Calvin Harris (New York City, Boston, Washington, DC, Rosemont, Sunrise, Tampa)
- Jessie J (Los Angeles, Saint Paul, Philadelphia, New York City, Boston, Washington, DC, Rosemont, Sunrise, Tampa)
- Jeremih (Dallas, Saint Paul)
- Nick Jonas (Los Angeles, Philadelphia, New York City, Rosemont, Sunrise, Tampa)
- Kiesza (Los Angeles, Saint Paul, Philadelphia, Boston, Washington, DC, Rosemont, Sunrise, Tampa)
- Mary Lambert (Sunrise)
- Lil Jon (Boston, Washington, DC)
- Demi Lovato (Saint Paul, Washington, DC, Rosemont, Tampa)
- Magic! (Boston, Rosemont, Sunrise, Tampa)
- Maroon 5 (New York City)
- Shawn Mendes (Los Angeles, Saint Paul, Philadelphia, New York City, Boston, Washington, DC, Rosemont, Sunrise, Tampa)
- Jake Miller (Sunrise, Tampa)
- Nico & Vinz (Saint Paul)
- OneRepublic (Saint Paul, Philadelphia, New York City, Boston, Washington, DC, Rosemont)
- Rita Ora (Los Angeles, Saint Paul, Philadelphia, New York City, Washington, DC, Rosemont)
- Rixton (Los Angeles, Philadelphia, New York City, Boston, Washiington, DC, Sunrise, Tampa)
- Sam Smith (Los Angeles, Philadelphia, New York City)
- Taylor Swift (Los Angeles, New York City)
- T.I. (Saint Paul)
- Meghan Trainor (Los Angeles, Saint Paul, Philadelphia, New York City, Boston, Washington, DC, Rosemont, Sunrise, Tampa)
- Pharrell (Los Angeles, New York City, Sunrise, Tampa)
- Charli XCX (Los Angeles, New York City, Boston, Washington, DC, Rosemont, Sunrise, Tampa)
- 5 Seconds of Summer (Los Angeles, New York City, Boston, Washington, DC)

== Shows ==
Date (2014)	City	State	Venue	Station	Ticket sales	Revenue
December 5	Los Angeles	California	Staples Center	102.7 KIIS FM	16,729	$1,646,045
December 8	Saint Paul	Minnesota	Xcel Energy Center	101.3 KDWB	—N/a	—N/a
December 10	Philadelphia	Pennsylvania	Wells Fargo Center	Q102	16,245	$1,194,477
December 12	New York City	New York	Madison Square Garden	Z100	17,486	$2,563,360
December 14	Boston	Massachusetts	TD Garden	Kiss 108	—N/a	—N/a
December 15	Washington, D.C.		Verizon Center	HOT 99.5	15,851	$1,425,570
December 18	Rosemont	Illinois	Allstate Arena	103.5 KISS FM	—N/a	—N/a
December 21	Sunrise	Florida	BB&T Center	Y100	—N/a	—N/a
December 22	Tampa	Florida	Amalie Arena	93.3 FLZ	11,149	$672,747
Total					104,085 / 104,085	$10,342,760
