= Ariana Savalas =

American singer and songwriter (born 1987)

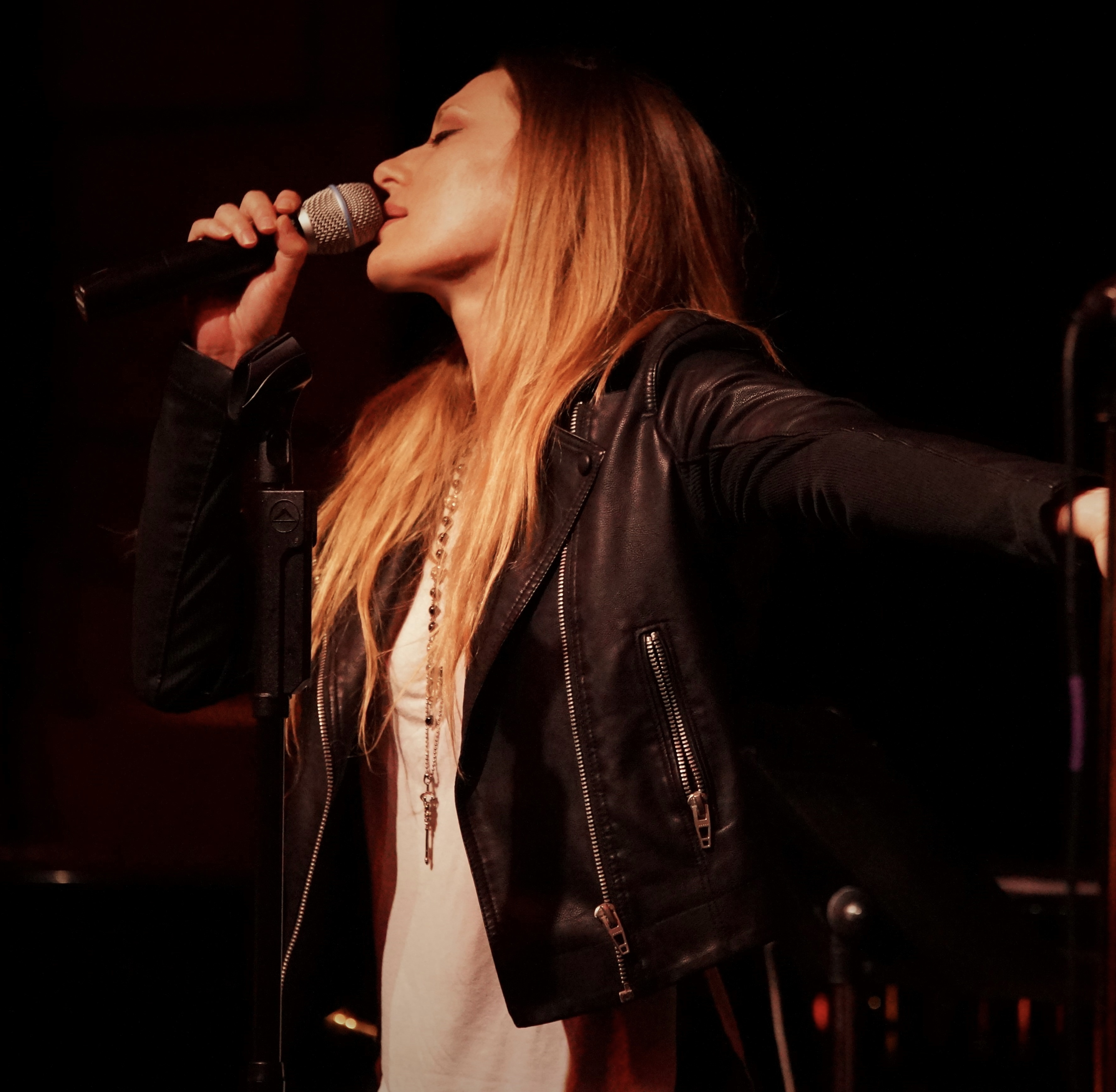

Background information
- Born: January 9, 1987 (age 39); Los Angeles, California, U.S.
- Genres: Cabaret
- Occupations: Singer, songwriter
- Instrument: Vocals
- Website: arianasavalas.com

Ariana Savalas (/səˈvɑːləs, -ˈvæl-/ sə-VA(H)L-əs; born January 9, 1987) is an American singer and songwriter. She has worked as the emcee and singer for burlesque performer Dita Von Teese and the Crazy Horse cabaret in Paris.

She was one of the original members of Postmodern Jukebox alongside Haley Reinhart, Casey Abrams, Robyn Adele Anderson, and Morgan James, and the group's first female emcee. Savalas tours with the band and has appeared in a number of the group's YouTube videos, two of her videos in the top five most popular videos in the group's history.

== Early life ==
Savalas was born in Los Angeles, California, and was raised in Minnesota following the death of her father Telly Savalas in 1994. She attended an all-girls Catholic convent school in her teenage years before graduating early and moving to London to pursue a career in performance. She studied Shakespeare and acting at the Royal Academy of Dramatic Art in London and was a member of Playhouse West, a repertory theater directed by Jeff Goldblum.

Before turning to theater, Savalas toured and recorded in Europe as a pop singer in her teens with European producer Jack White. She made a guest appearance as Bobby Lainsford on the CBS hit drama Criminal Minds in 2010. Savalas began her music career in Los Angeles as a singer/songwriter playing venues on the Sunset Strip, such as the Whisky a Go Go and Hard Rock Cafe.

== Career ==
=== Debut singles and EP ===
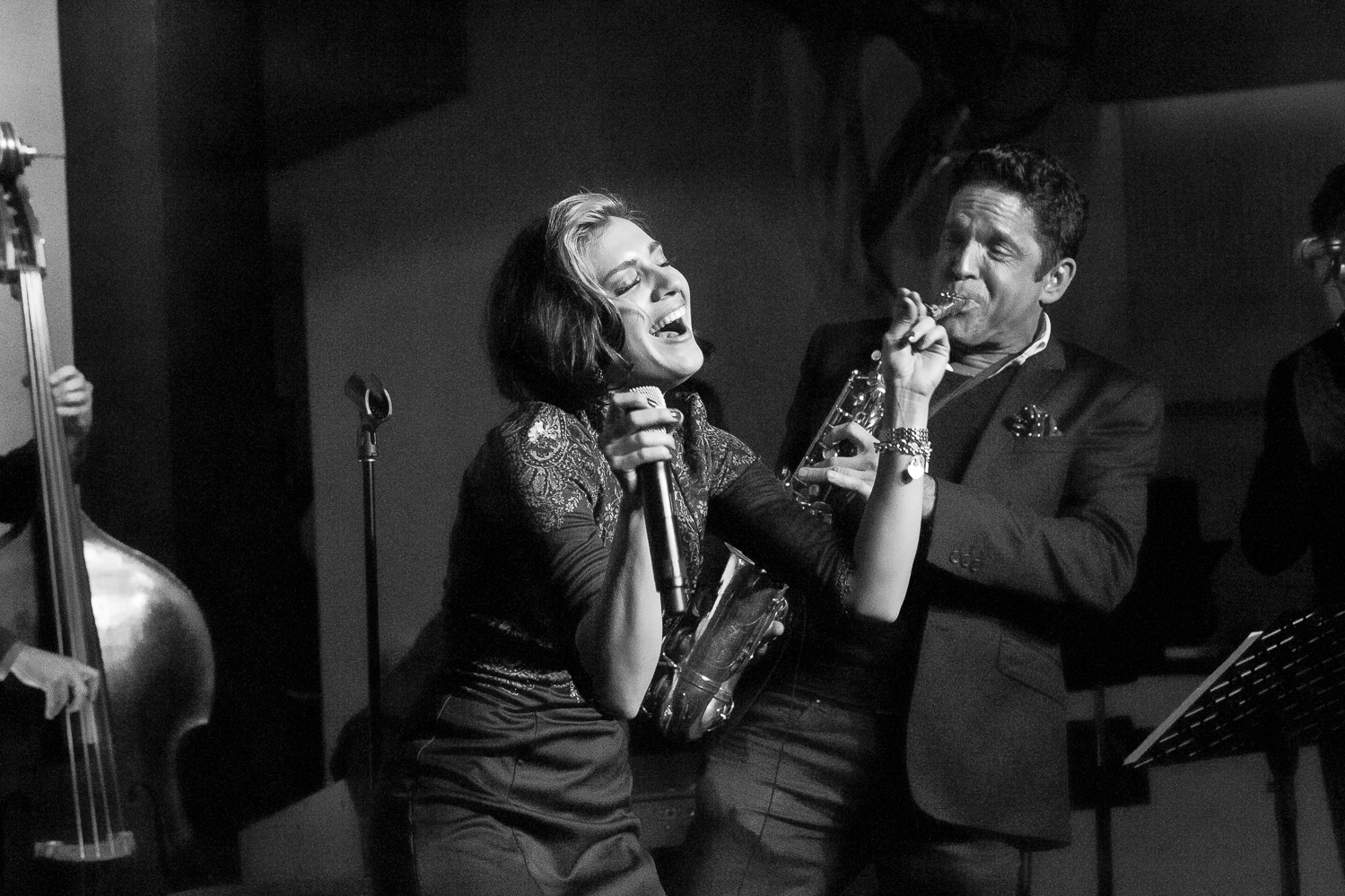
Ariana Savalas with Dave Koz

Savalas' first jazz EP, Sophisticated Lady, was a combination of her original compositions as well as two standards from the Great American Songbook, including the song "Sophisticated Lady" by Duke Ellington, Mitchell Parish, and Irving Mills which she named the record after. Savalas headlined venues such as the New York Friars' Club and Michael Feinstein's late New York cabaret Feinstein's. She was the opening act for saxophone player Kenny G and has toured the world with Dave Koz.

=== Postmodern Jukebox ===
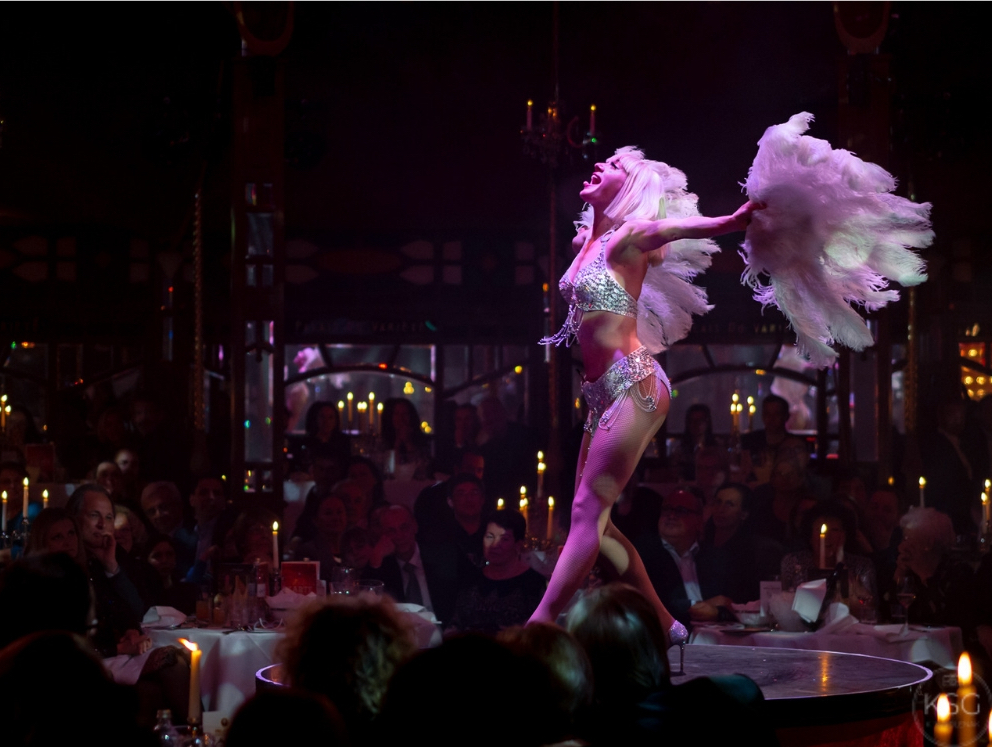
Ariana Savalas with Postmodern Jukebox

Savalas was introduced to Scott Bradlee in 2015 and began collaborating on online videos and touring with the band soon after. They have performed at venues such as Radio City Music Hall, The Greek Theater, and the O2 Academy in London. Savalas was their first female emcee, and hosted the first PMJ PBS special "Postmodern Jukebox: The New Classics". Savalas has garnered praise for her singing and also for her skill at jazz whistling.

=== Cabaret ===
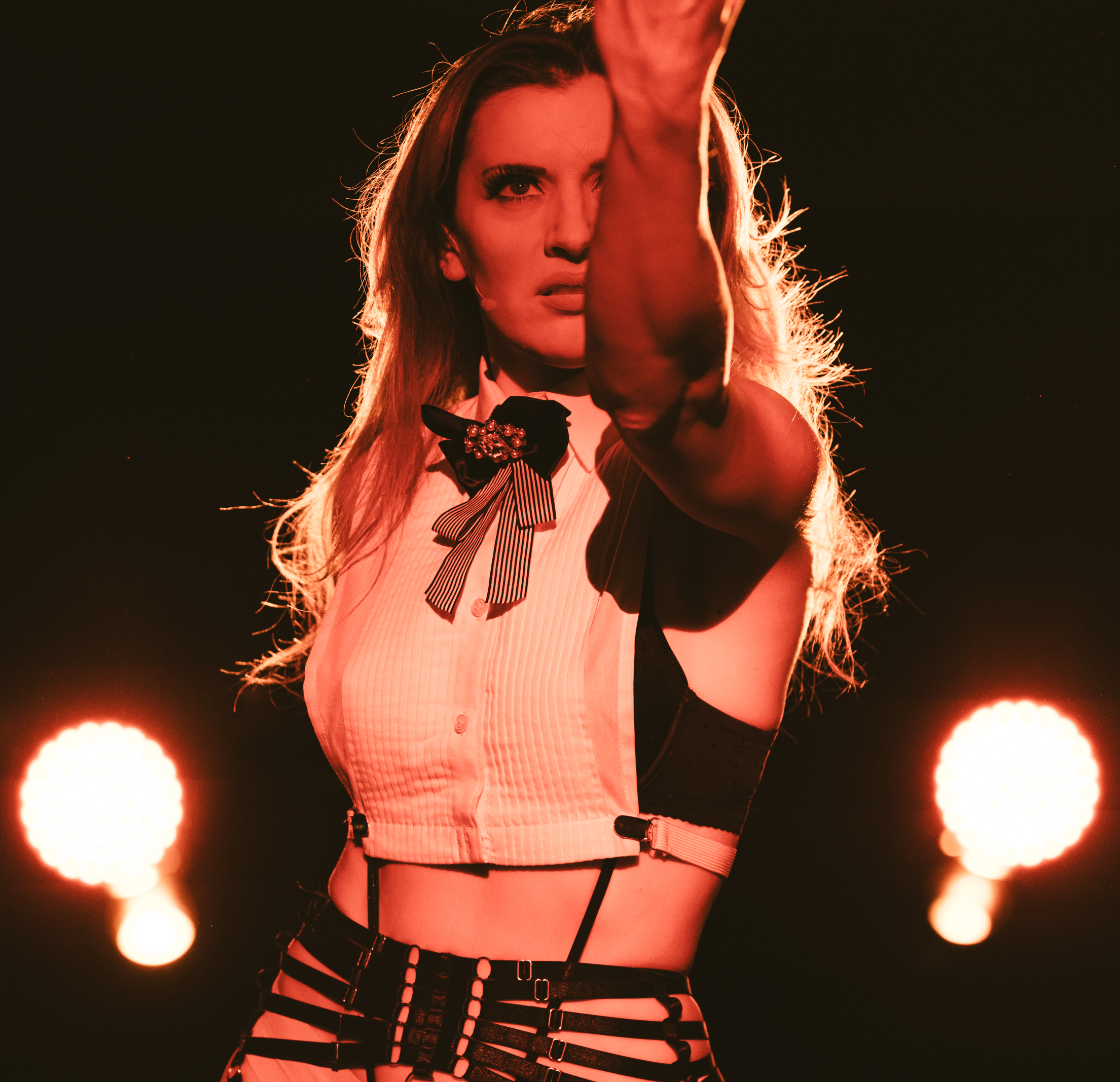
Ariana Savalas at Faena Theater

Savalas began incorporating her own music into live shows, drawing influences from the Weimar Republic era of German Cabaret and the Moulin Rouge. Her 2019 live album, The Ménage a Tour! Live from Las Vegas is a showcase of music, songwriting, dance, comedy, and cabaret. Savalas released a single and music video for her original song "Legendary Lover" in early 2020.

== Discography ==
- Legendary Lover (single)
- Sophisticated Lady
- The Ménage a Tour! Live from Las Vegas

=== Featured with Postmodern Jukebox ===
- The Essentials - "No Diggity"
- Swipe Right for Vintage - "Criminal"
- Top Hat on Fleek - "Single Ladies (Put a Ring On It)"
- Selfies on Kodachrome - "Blank Space"
- PBS presents Scott Bradlee's Postmodern Jukebox, The New Classics
- Emoji Antique - "Bad Romance"
- Historical Misappropriation - "No Diggity"
- Swing the Vote - "Pony"
- PMJ is for Lovers - "Blank Space"
- Fake Blues - "Thong Song"
- New Gramaphone, who dis? - "It Wasn't Me"
- Jazz Age Thirst Trap - "Bad Guy"
- The Essentials II - "All About the Bass"
- 33 Resolutions Per Minute - "Bye Bye Bye"
