= Postmodern Jukebox =

American retro music collective

Background information
- Also known as: PMJ, Scott Bradlee's Postmodern Jukebox
- Origin: New York City
- Genres: Jazz; ragtime; swing
- Years active: 2011–present
- Labels: Mud Hut Digital, Concord Records
- Website: postmodernjukebox.com

Postmodern Jukebox (PMJ), also known as Scott Bradlee's Postmodern Jukebox, is a rotating musical collective founded by New York-based pianist Scott Bradlee in 2011. Postmodern Jukebox is known for reworking popular modern music into different vintage genres, especially early 20th century forms such as swing and jazz. They have toured North America, Europe, and Australia; often simultaneously due to the extensive discography and the numerous artists and performers involved in the project. Postmodern Jukebox has amassed over 2.2 billion YouTube views and 6.4 million YouTube subscribers since its introduction in 2011.

Each week, Postmodern Jukebox releases a new video on YouTube. Although originally most were filmed casually in Bradlee's apartment living room, sets became more elaborate over time. The band has covered songs by artists ranging from Lady Gaga and the Strokes to Katy Perry and the White Stripes. Since their beginnings as a small group of friends making music in a basement in Queens, New York, Postmodern Jukebox has gone on to feature 70 different performers and tour six continents.

== History ==
=== Origin ===
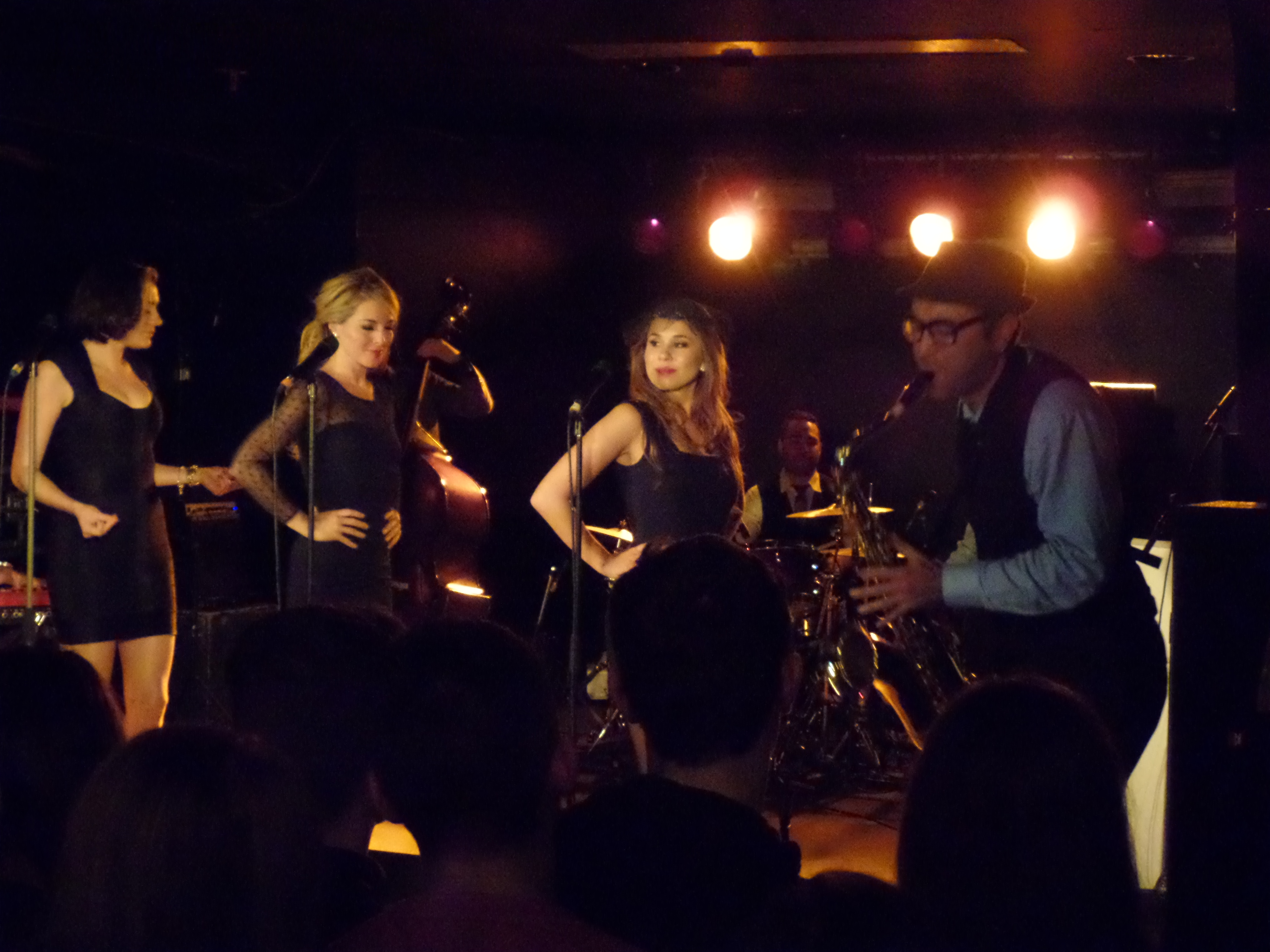
Ariana Savalas, Morgan James, Haley Reinhart, and Golder-Novick perform with Postmodern Jukebox in Cologne, Germany, in March 2015.

Postmodern Jukebox originated when Scott Bradlee began shooting videos with friends from college in his basement apartment in Astoria. This group included bassist Chris Anderson, saxophonist Ben Golder-Novick, harpist Brandee Younger, and vocalist Emma Walker.

Bradlee struggled for years as a jazz musician in New York City before one of his videos ("a medley of '80s songs done ragtime style") became popular in 2009. He received a message on Twitter from author Neil Gaiman. Two years later his video for "A Motown Tribute to Nickelback" included Drue Davis (emcee), Steve Ujfalussy (saxophone, EWI) Adam Kubota (bass), Allan Mednard (drums), and Tim Kubart (tambourine).

=== 2012–present ===
Robyn Adele Anderson was integrated into the collective in 2012, becoming for a time the group's primary lead vocalist. With over one million views in its first week, and four million in its first year, the group's cover version of Macklemore & Ryan Lewis' "Thrift Shop" (2012) with Anderson on lead vocals was Postmodern Jukebox's first viral music video. The song was included on Introducing Postmodern Jukebox (2013) and reached No. 8 on the Billboard magazine jazz album chart. This was followed by her cover of Miley Cyrus' "We Can't Stop" in 2013. The band performed on Good Morning America in September. Beginning in 2013, the band began using guest vocalists on a frequent basis, though Anderson continued with PMJ through 2017 before going solo.

In late 2013, Postmodern Jukebox was invited to the New York City offices of Cosmopolitan to film a year-end tribute to 2013, covering the year's hit songs with arrangements from different genres and times. The "Just Another Day at the Office" mashup included Robyn Adele Anderson singing "Blurred Lines", Cristina Gatti singing "Holy Grail", Anderson and the Tee Tones singing "We Can't Stop", Karen Marie singing "Roar", Ashley Stroud singing "Royals", and Andromeda Turre singing "What Does the Fox Say?". The production was completed in a single take, and a companion behind-the-scenes video was also produced.

In 2014, Kate Davis performed a cover version of Meghan Trainor's song "All About That Bass" (2014) in Scott Bradlee's living room after three hours of practice. Davis sang and played double bass; her rendition gathered 8 million views in three months. "I knew the song, probably could have done it on the fly. Maybe that's why it's so funny. I remember thinking it was so funny at the time I was going to crack up, maybe five times." The 1940s arrangement and piano accompaniment is by Bradlee with Dave Tedeschi on drums. The single was a success, catching the attention of Time, Billboard, The Huffington Post, and PBS NewsHour.

BuzzFeed featured a doo-wop cover of "Timber," with Robyn Adele Anderson and the Tee Tones fronting, in February 2014. The group's cover of Radiohead's seminal 1990s hit "Creep," performed by Haley Reinhart, was called a "stunning listen" by the Los Angeles Times in April 2015. As of April 2022, the video had over 105 million views and was their most viewed video.

In 2015, Broadway actress Shoshana Bean became active with the group as a guest artist when Bradlee moved to Los Angeles. Broadway World raved about Bean's performance of Sia's "Chandelier" at the Segerstrom Center for the Arts in Costa Mesa, California, and Billboard did a feature story on Motown version of Justin Bieber's "Sorry". Bean joined the Postmodern Jukebox 2016 spring European tour at its midway point.

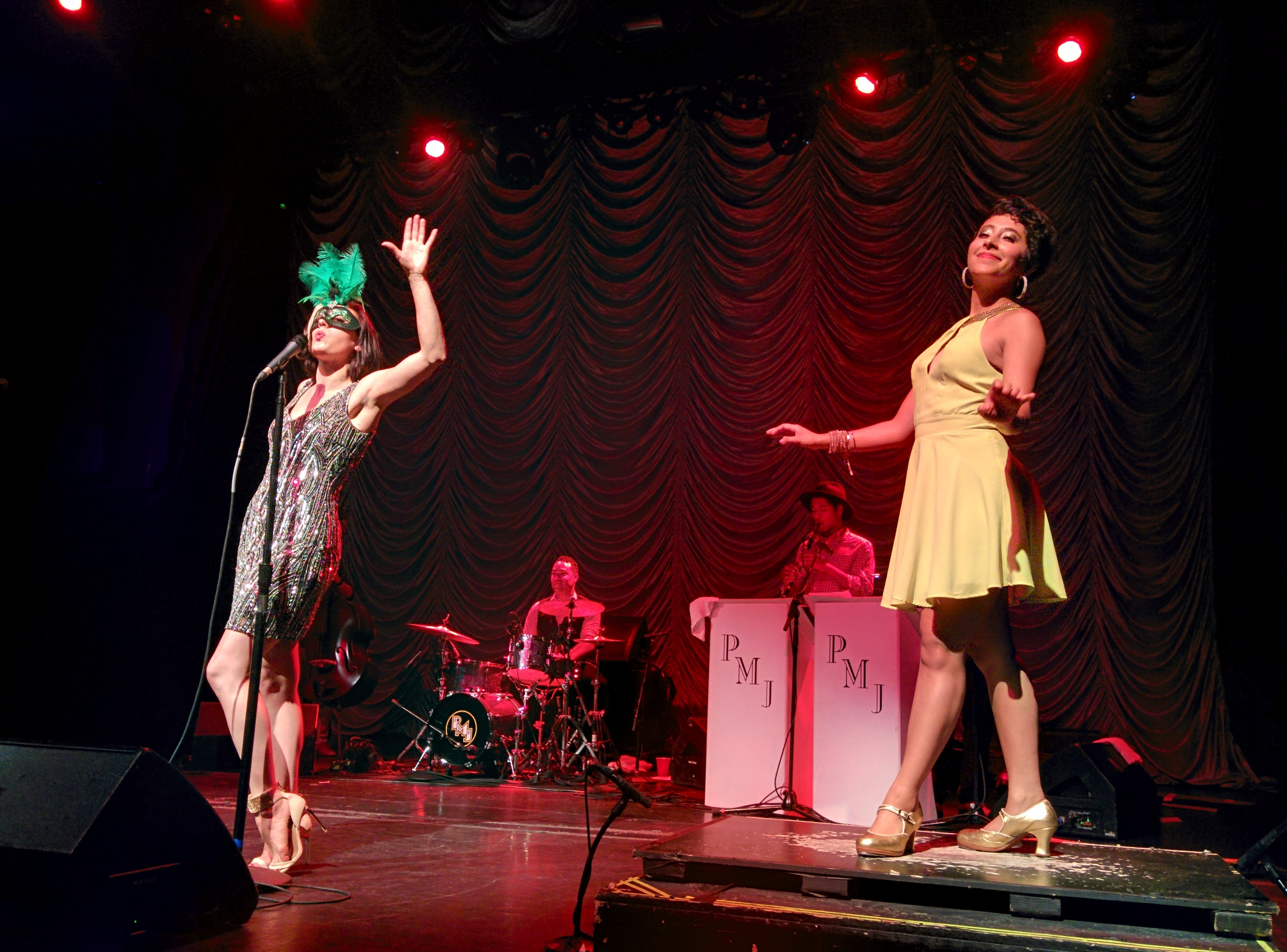
Ariana Savalas and Sarah Reich perform "Bad Romance" by Lady Gaga at The Regency Ballroom in San Francisco.

Sara Niemietz performed with the cast in August 2015, covering Talking Heads' "This Must Be the Place (Naive Melody)" (1983), PMJ's rendition of "Hey Ya!" (2003) by Outkast, a Dixieland arrangement of Justin Bieber's "Love Yourself" (2015), and a club version of the "Pokémon Theme". Niemietz joined the band's northeastern leg of its 2015 U.S. tour and the entire 2016 European tour. MTV U.K. caught up with the show in London and spotlighted a big band cover version of Elle King's "Ex's & Oh's" (2014) with Niemietz on vocals and Sarah Reich tap dancing.

In early February 2016, Postmodern Jukebox covered David Bowie's song "Heroes" in honor of World Cancer Day with vocals by Nicole Atkins. The song was released to earn money for the Cancer Research Institute. In 2016, Heineken announced a global partnership with Formula One racing, and in September released the "If You Drive, Never Drink" campaign commercial with driver Sir Jackie Stewart (the "Flying Scot") and "Heroes" as background music.

Around the same time, PMJ started Reboxed, consisting of new versions of songs that had already been covered. The first Reboxed song was by Niemietz and the Sole Sisters singing "Bad Romance", which had been sung by Ariana Savalas with Sarah Reich tap dancing. Adweek named Bradlee one of "20 Content Creators Who Are Setting the Bar for Creativity in 2016".

In 2016 they acquired PMJ Manor in Los Angeles. In late May 2018, PMJ surpassed the one billion view mark on YouTube. Bradlee, members of the band, and guests hosted their first live stream event from the PMJ Manor to celebrate.

On June 12, 2018, Scott Bradlee released his first book, a memoir entitled Outside the Jukebox: How I Turned My Vintage Music Obsession into My Dream Gig. The book received positive reviews from Publishers Weekly, The Weekly Standard, and Billboard.

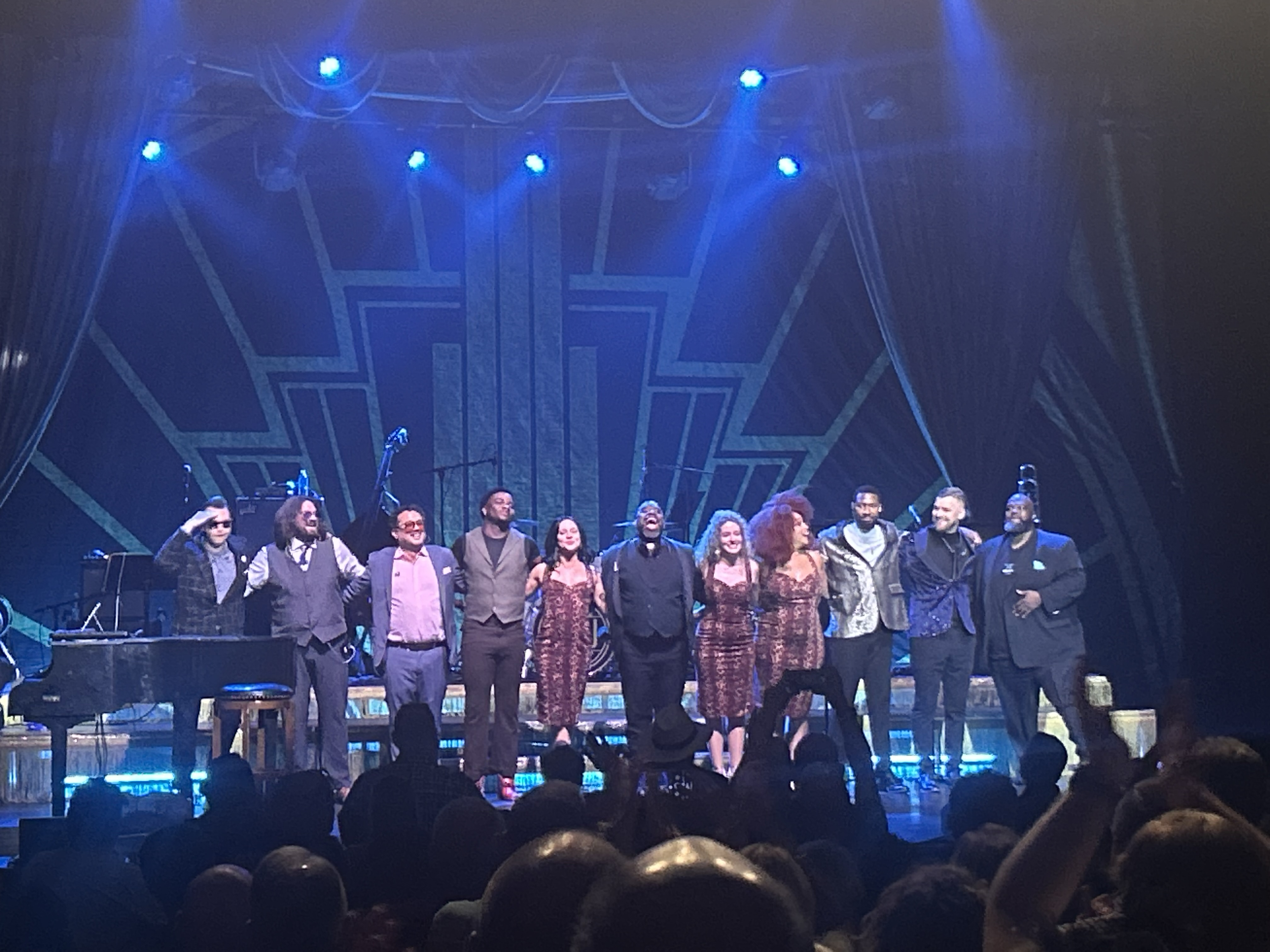
Postmodern Jukebox touring in Akron, Ohio in July 2025

In 2014, PMJ started the first annual #PMJSearch contest to discover musical talent. The month-long competition asks fans to submit videos of themselves performing versions of PMJ songs for a chance to perform on an upcoming official video. Out of the many videos that are submitted each year, the winner is selected by Scott Bradlee. Past winners include Holly Campbell-Smith (2015), Devi Ananda (2016), Olivia Kuper Harris (2017), and Cortnie Frazier (2019) all of whom went on to be featured in PMJ videos, as well as on tour with the band. Harris' feature on "Last Friday Night" caught the attention of the song's original singer, Katy Perry, during an online feature for Glamour.

== Touring ==
On February 24, 2016, Postmodern Jukebox opened at the Dubai International Jazz Festival, alongside Sting, Toto, Chris Botti, and David Gray.

The 2016 tours included three continents:

1. a 75-date European tour starting at Vicar Street in Dublin, Ireland, wrapping on June 3, 2016, in Athens, Greece.
2. A 16-city Australia/New Zealand tour, which kicked off on August 29, 2016, at the Isaac Theatre Royal in Christchurch, wrapping on September 20, 2016, at the Perth Concert Hall. and
3. a 45-stop fall North American tour, kicking off on September 29, 2016, at the Veterans Memorial Auditorium in Providence, Rhode Island, and wrapping on November 27, 2016, in Mesa, Arizona.

The 2017 tour included concurrent dates in Europe and the US, with two separate "casts" of musicians.

PMJ made their first visit of South America in August 2017, with four dates in Brazil and one in Argentina.

In April 2018, PMJ made their debut in Africa, performing in Tunisia at the Jazz a Carthage Festival and Morocco at the Jazzablanca Festival, marking the sixth continent on which they have performed.

== Performers ==
=== Creator and founder ===
- Scott Bradlee – piano, arrangements

=== Guest musicians ===
The band has featured the following artists as guest musicians:

- Adam Kubota – bass
- Allan Mednard – drums
- Arthur Vint – drums
- Chip Thomas – drums
- Cynthia Sayer – banjo
- Dave Koz – saxophone
- Gunhild Carling – various instruments
- Tim Kubart aka "Tambourine Guy" – tambourine
- Tosin Abasi
- Aly Ryan - Vocal, 99 Luft Ballons

=== Guest vocalists ===
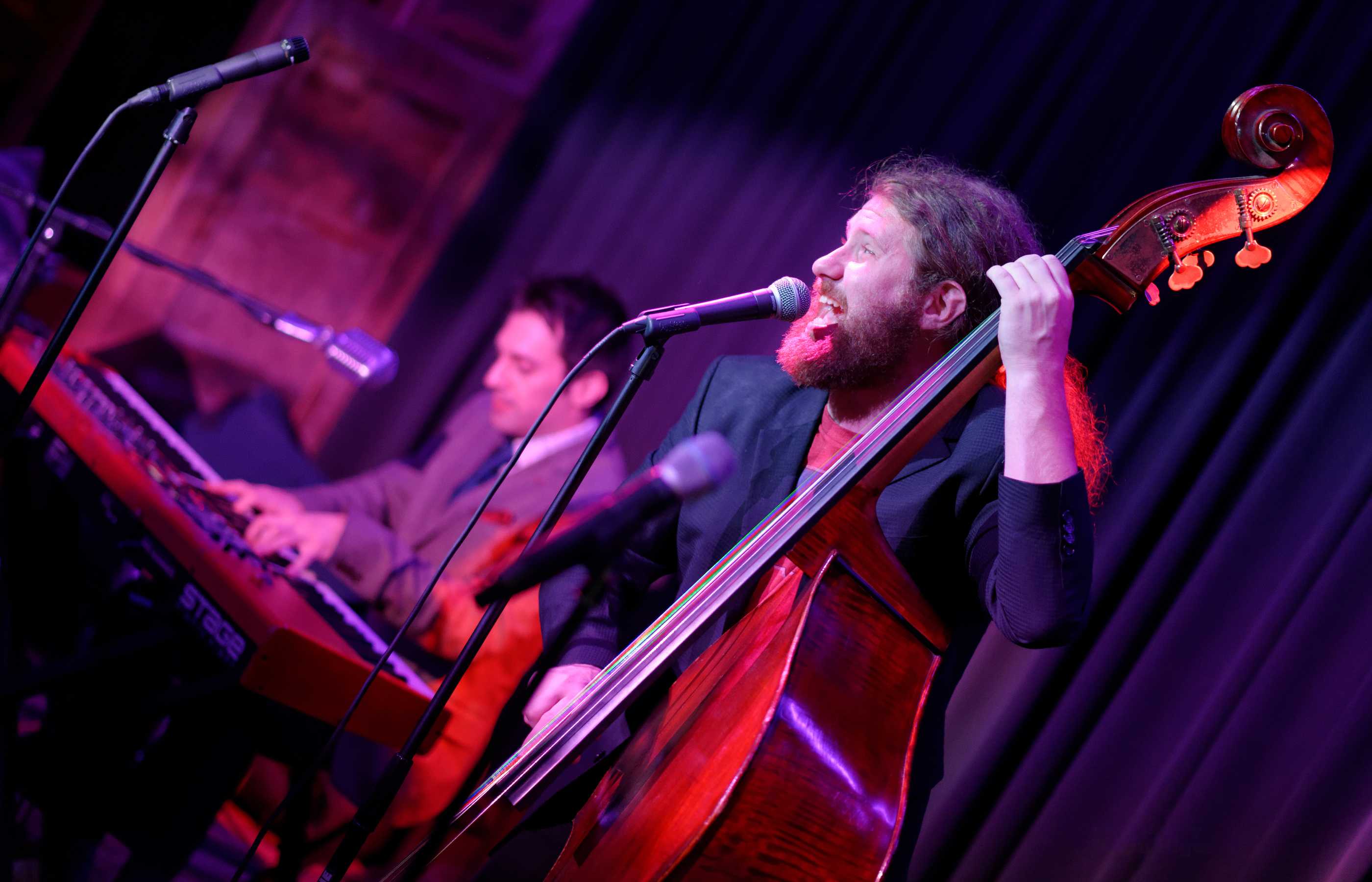
Casey Abrams performs at the "Postmodern Jukebox" music series, at Hyde Sunset Kitchen + Cocktails in Los Angeles on Nov. 26th, 2014.

Several former American Idol finalists have found success as part of Postmodern Jukebox's ensemble, including Vonzell Solomon (season 4), Blake Lewis (season 6), Melinda Doolittle (season 6), Haley Reinhart (Season 10), Casey Abrams (Season 10), Thia Megia (season 10), DeAndre Brackensick (season 11) and Catie Turner (season 16). Four Season 14 finalists have also performed lead vocals for the group: Joey Cook, Rayvon Owen, Clark Beckham, and JAX. Additionally, vocalists Aubrey Logan, Von Smith, and Brielle Von Hugel are Idol alums who went through the audition process but did not advance to the finals in any season.

Xavier Woods appeared in the cover of "What Is Love", with his trombone "Francesca" and later recorded a video that was released on his channel (UpUpDownDown), in which they cover the SpongeBob SquarePants theme song.

In February 2020, the Rembrandts appeared as part of an evolution of "I'll Be There for You".

The band has featured the following artists as guest vocalists and performers:

- Alisan Porter – vocals
- Allison Young - vocals
- Anissa Lee – tap dancing
- Ariana Savalas – vocals
- Ashley Campbell - vocals, guitar, banjo
- Ashley Stroud – vocals
- Aubrey Logan – vocals, trombone
- Blake Lewis – vocals
- Brielle Von Hugel – vocals
- Candice Parise – vocals
- Caroline Baran – vocals
- Casey Abrams – vocals, bass, melodica
- Catie Turner – vocals
- Chloe Feoranzo – vocals & clarinet
- Clark Beckham – vocals
- Cristina Gatti – vocals
- Daniela Andrade – vocals
- Emma Hatton – vocals
- Grace Kelly – vocals, saxophone, swing dancing
- Gunhild Carling – vocals, recorder, trombone, bagpipes, trumpet, tap dancing, harmonica, piano, drums
- Haley Reinhart – vocals
- Jax – vocals
- Jennie Lena – vocals
- Joey Cook – vocals, ukulele, accordion
- Juliette Goglia – vocals, dancing
- Kate Davis – vocals, upright bass
- Kelley Jakle – vocals
- Kenton Chen – vocals
- Kylan deGhetaldi – piano
- Kyndle Wylde – vocals
- Lauren Molina – cello
- Lauren Tyler Scott – vocals
- Lavance Colley– vocals
- Maiya Sykes – vocals
- Maris Jones - vocals
- Martina DaSilva – vocals
- Mayré Martínez – vocals
- Melinda Doolittle – vocals
- Melinda Sullivan – tap dancing
- Miche Braden – vocals
- Morgan James – vocals
- Mykal Kilgore – vocals
- Niia – vocals
- Nicole Atkins – vocals
- Olivia Kuper Harris – vocals
- Pia Toscano – vocals
- Puddles Pity Party – vocals
- Rayvon Owen – vocals
- Robyn Adele Anderson – vocals
- Sara Niemietz – vocals
- Sarah Reich – tap dancing
- Scotty Grand – vocals, flute
- Shoshana Bean – vocals
- Stefano Langone – vocals
- Sunny Holiday – vocals, dancing
- Tatum Langley – vocals
- Thor Jensen - guitar
- Thia Megia – vocals
- Tony DeSare – vocals, piano
- Von Smith – vocals
- Vonzell Solomon – vocals
- Wayne Brady – vocals

== Discography ==
=== Albums ===
Scott Bradlee's Postmodern Jukebox
Year	Album	Peak chart positions			Notes
Year	Album	Jazz Albums	Top Heatseekers	Top Independent Albums	Notes
2013	Introducing Postmodern Jukebox (EP)	8	31	—	Billboard Jazz Albums: Peaked at #8 on Sept 12, 2013
2013	Postmodern Jukebox, Season 2 (EP)				
2014	Twist Is The New Twerk	4	7	48	#16 on Billboard Jazz Albums: Year End 2015. Billboard Jazz Albums: Peaked at #4 on Jan 22, 2014
2014	Clubbin' With Grandpa	4	—	—	Billboard Jazz Albums: Peaked at #4 on June 7, 2014
2014	Saturday Morning Slow Jams	—	—	—	
2014	Historical Misappropriation	3	11	43	#20 on Billboard Jazz Albums: Year End 2015. Billboard Jazz Albums: Peaked at #3 on Sept 09, 2014
2014	A Very Postmodern Christmas	7	22	22	Billboard Jazz Albums: Peaked at #7 on Dec 19, 2014
2015	Selfies on Kodachrome	6	—	—	Billboard Jazz Albums: Peaked at #6 on Jan 31, 2015
2015	Emoji Antique	8	—	—	Billboard Jazz Albums: Peaked at #8 on May 16, 2015
2015	Swipe Right for Vintage	5	19	—	Billboard Jazz Albums: Peaked at #5 on Sept 05, 2015
2015	Top Hat on Fleek	6	20	20	Billboard Jazz Albums: Peaked at #6 on Nov 27, 2015
2016	PMJ And Chill	10	—	—	Billboard Jazz Albums: Peaked at #10 on Mar 11, 2016
2016	Swing the Vote	11	—	—	Billboard Jazz Albums: Peaked at #11 on May 6, 2016
2016	Squad Goals	10	—	—	Billboard Jazz Albums: Peaked at #10 on Aug 5, 2016
2016	The Essentials	2	5	—	Billboard Jazz Albums: Peaked at #2 on Sept 2, 2016 Compilation album
2017	33 Resolutions Per Minute	8	—	—	Billboard Jazz Albums: Peaked at #8 on Jan 01, 2017
2017	Fake Blues	5	—	—	Billboard Jazz Albums: Peaked at #5 on Apr 28, 2017
2017	New Gramophone, Who Dis?	16	—	—	Billboard Jazz Albums: Peaked at #16 on July 21, 2017
2017	The New Classics (Recorded Live!)	5	8	8	Billboard Jazz Albums: Peaked at #5 on Jan 15, 2017
2018	Jazz Me Outside, Pt. 1	—	—	—	
2018	Jazz Me Outside, Pt. 2	21	—	—	Billboard Jazz Albums: Peaked at #21 on Apr 6, 2018
2018	Learn to Floss in 3 Easy Steps	—	—	—	
2018	Blue Mirror	15	—	—	Billboard Jazz Albums: Peaked at #15 on Sept 5, 2018
2018	The Essentials II	10	—	—	Billboard Jazz Albums: Peaked at #10 on Nov 18, 2018 Compilation album
2019	Sepia Is the New Orange	15	—	—	Billboard Jazz Albums: Peaked at #15 on Mar 1, 2019
2019	Jazz Age Thirst Trap	19	—	—	Billboard Jazz Albums: Peaked at #19 on June 28, 2019
2019	Throwback Clapback	—	—	—	
2020	BACK When They Called It Music. The '90s, Vol. 1				
2020	At The Piano				
2020	OK Crooner				
2021	The Essentials III				Compilation album
2022	OldieFans				
2023	The Fourth Tuning				
2024	Puttin' on the Rizz				
2025	Lounge Language Models				
2025	The Essentials IV				Compilation album
