= All About That Bass =

Single by Meghan Trainor

from the EP Title and the album Title
- B-side: "Title"; "Dear Future Husband"; "Close Your Eyes"
- Released: June 30, 2014
- Recorded: 2012–2013 (Note: Finished by Kadish two to three days after his July 2013 studio session with Trainor, the demo of "All About That Bass" was used as the final version.)
- Studio: The Carriage House (Nolensville, Tennessee); Sun Mountain (Boiceville, New York)
- Genre: Bubblegum pop; doo-wop; hip-hop
- Length: 3:07
- Label: Epic
- Songwriters: Meghan Trainor; Kevin Kadish
- Producer: Kevin Kadish

Meghan Trainor singles chronology
"All About That Bass" (2014)	"Lips Are Movin" (2014)

Music video
- "All About That Bass" on YouTube

"All About That Bass" is the debut single by American singer-songwriter Meghan Trainor, released on June 30, 2014, through Epic Records. The song was included on Trainor's debut extended play (EP), Title (2014), and her debut studio album of the same name (2015). The track, a bubblegum pop, doo-wop and hip-hop record, was recorded from 2012 to 2013 at the Carriage House, based in Nolensville, Tennessee, and Sun Mountain Studios, based in Boiceville, New York. It was written by Trainor herself, alongside Kevin Kadish, who also produced the song. Trainor was inspired to write the song to promote self-acceptance and body positivity after struggling with her negative body image as a teenager.

Upon its release, some music critics praised the song's production and memorable message, while others called it a novelty song and criticized the failure of its lyrics to empower every body type. "All About That Bass" was nominated for numerous awards and accolades, including Record of the Year and Song of the Year at the 57th Annual Grammy Awards. It was the best-selling song by a female artist during the 2010s in the United States and was certified Diamond by the Recording Industry Association of America (RIAA). The song also reached number one in 18 additional countries and received Diamond certifications in Australia, Brazil, and Canada, as well as multi-platinum certifications in Denmark, Italy, Mexico, New Zealand, Norway, Sweden, Spain, and the United Kingdom, becoming the fourth best-selling song of 2014 with 11 million copies sold worldwide.

Fatima Robinson directed the song's music video, which features 1950s-inspired aesthetics and a pink pastel backdrop. The video was released on June 10, 2014, and played an important role in the song's rise to prominence. "All About That Bass" inspired parodies and cover versions, such as a parody from the cast of This Hour Has 22 Minutes, and covers from The Roots, Avi Kaplan of Pentatonix, and Maejor with Justin Bieber. Trainor performed the song on television shows and broadcasts such as The Tonight Show Starring Jimmy Fallon, the 48th Annual Country Music Association Awards (with Miranda Lambert), and The X Factor UK, and included it on the set lists of her concert tours That Bass Tour and MTrain Tour (2015), the Untouchable Tour (2016), and the Timeless Tour (2024).

== Background ==
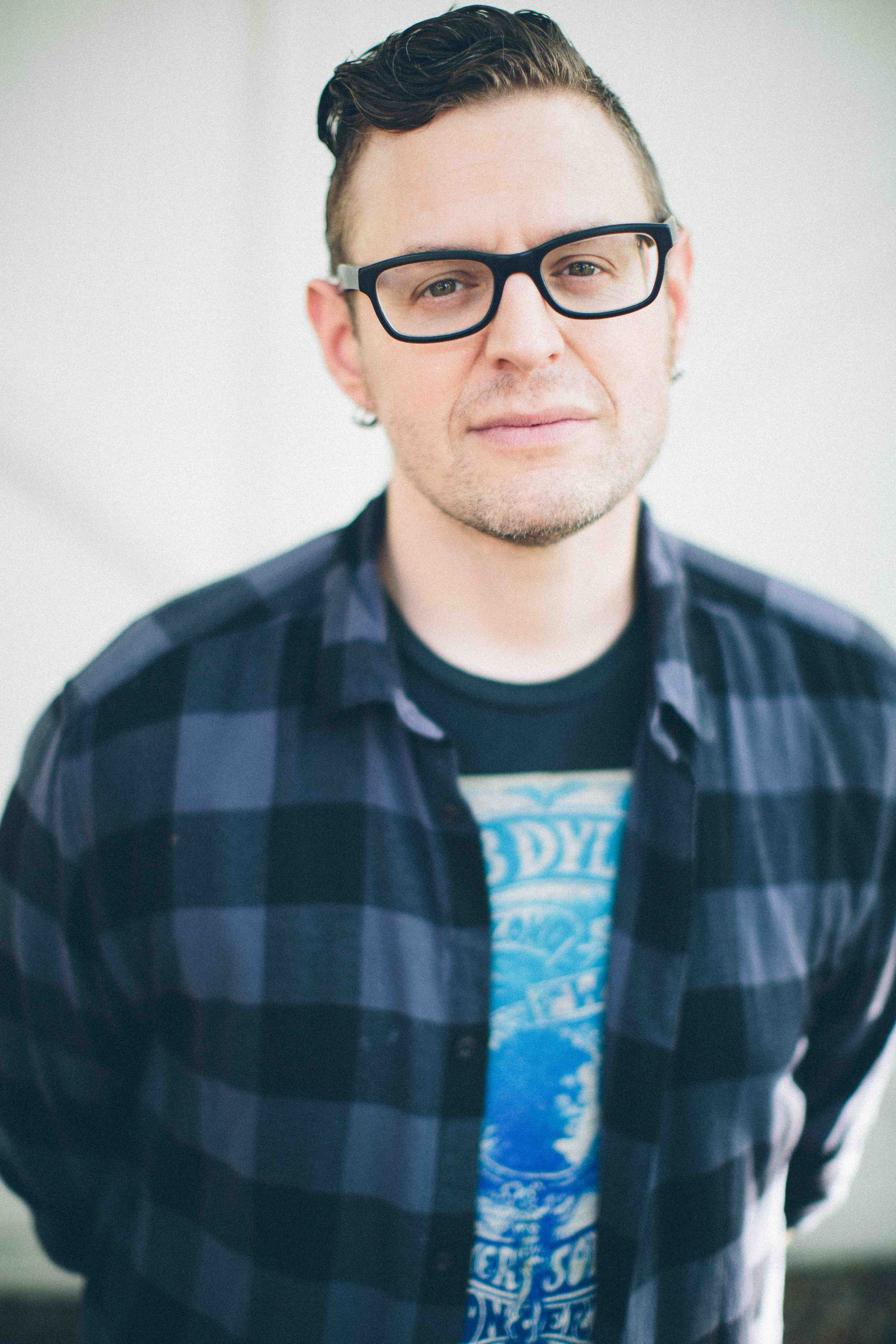
Kevin Kadish produced and co-wrote "All About That Bass".

After independently releasing three albums herself between 2009 and 2010, Meghan Trainor decided to write songs for other singers because she considered herself "one of the chubby girls who would never be an artist". In 2012, Trainor signed a publishing deal with Big Yellow Dog Music, a Nashville, Tennessee-based music publishing firm, and moved to Nashville the following November. American songwriter Kevin Kadish met Trainor in June 2013 at the request of Carla Wallace, a co-owner of Big Yellow Dog. Kadish liked Trainor's voice and booked a writing session with her the following month. He said it was "like a blind date" because they had a strong song-writing affinity and a mutual love of pop music from the 1950s and 1960s.

Kadish read a list of potential song titles to Trainor, of which "All Bass, No Treble" was her favorite. Trainor was inspired by her teenage problems with self-acceptance and body image, and suggested these as a basis for the lyrics. She told Rolling Stone Kadish had experienced similar problems during his childhood and could relate to these themes. She suggested a booty theme with "it's about the bass, not the treble". Trainor was also inspired by Bruno Mars's "Just the Way You Are" (2010), and criticized the use of electronically edited images in beauty magazines. Kadish played a drum beat while Trainor sang the hook, "I'm all about that bass, 'bout the bass, no treble". Kadish and Trainor wanted to incorporate influences of 1950s doo-wop, a genre Trainor found catchy, into the song, which they wrote within 40 minutes. According to Kadish, he and Trainor equally contributed to the lyrics and melody, and Kadish finished the demo of "All About That Bass" two to three days later.

Although both were satisfied with the song, they doubted its commercial prospects. They pitched it to several record labels, who said it would not be successful because of its retro-styled composition and wanted to rerecord it using synthesizers, which Kadish and Trainor refused. Trainor sang "All About That Bass" for Paul Pontius, who was the A&R manager for Epic Records chairman L.A. Reid. She performed the song the following week using a ukulele for Reid, who signed her with the record label 20 minutes later. Reid decided that the demo, with additional mastering, should be the song's final cut. Speaking in 2015, he said that he considered it "lightning in a bottle" and realized at their first meeting Trainor "was going to explode".

== Composition and lyrical interpretation ==
"All About That Bass" (2014)
An 18-second sample of "All About That Bass", featuring Trainor singing the track's pre-chorus, which is complemented by a scatting tempo, shimmying melody and early 1960s soul-pop groove

"All About That Bass" is three minutes and eight seconds long. The song was produced, engineered, programmed, sound designed, and mixed by Kadish—who also played drums, electric guitar, and bass guitar—at the Carriage House studio in Nolensville, Tennessee. David Baron played the piano, baritone saxophone, and Hammond organ. Trainor provided the track's clapping and percussion, and Dave Kutch mastered the recording at the Mastering Palace in New York City.

"All About That Bass" is a bubblegum pop, doo-wop and hip hop song. Kelsey McKinney of Vox characterized it as retro-R&B pop, while Slate's Chris Molanphy described its style as "vintage white-girl, Italo-Latin soul". The track has a 1950s-inspired throwback soul beat, and influences from 1960s genres—soul-pop, groove, Motown bounce and girl group pop. "All About That Bass" includes syncopated handclaps and bass instrumentation. In the song's outro, Trainor alternates between wordless vocal ad-libs and a pitched-down echo of "bass, bass, bass" at the end of the chorus mark. She raps some of the lyrics. According to Molanphy, it has "a scatting tempo and shimmying melody", which has been compared with South Korean group Koyote's song "Happy Mode" (2006) and American band Phish's song "Contact" (1989).

The lyrics of "All About That Bass" are a call to embrace inner beauty, and to promote positive body image and self-acceptance. The line "I'm bringing booty back" references Justin Timberlake's "SexyBack" (2006). In her song, Trainor criticizes the fashion industry for creating unreachable beauty standards. She affirms the listeners their bodies are flawless, and asks them to "move along" if they are only attracted to thin women. Trainor relates the form of music (bass and treble) to the human body being thick or thin, and asserts the importance of the former. Kevin O'Keeffe of The Atlantic compared its lyrical message to those of Kesha's "We R Who We R" (2010), Pink's "Fuckin' Perfect" (2010), and Sara Bareilles' "Brave" (2013), among others. The Guardian's Caroline Sullivan called "All About That Bass" a 2014 version of Christina Aguilera's "Beautiful" (2002).

== Release and promotion ==
"All About That Bass" was released as the lead single from Trainor's debut extended play (EP) Title in 2014 and her studio album of the same name the following year. Epic Records released the song for digital download in several countries on June 30, 2014, as Trainor's debut single, and serviced it to radio stations in the United States on the following day. In the United Kingdom, it became available to stream on August 14, and for download on September 28. Sony Music sent the track to radio stations in Italy on September 5, and the United Kingdom's BBC Radio 1 added it to its playlist three days later. An EP titled "All About That Bass" was released in Austria, Germany and Switzerland on October 3; it also included the tracks "Title", "Dear Future Husband", and "Close Your Eyes". On the same day, "All About That Bass" was released as a CD single in Germany with only "Title" as its b-side.

As "All About That Bass" began rising in popularity, Radio Disney's vice president of programming Phil Guerini asked Epic to send it a family-friendly version of the song with lyrics suitable for all audiences. The record label agreed to this because it wanted to maximize airplay and reach as many radio formats as possible. In the bowdlerized version, the line "But I can shake it, shake it, like I'm supposed to do" was replaced with "But Imma make it, make it, like I'm supposed to do"; and the line "Boys like a little more booty to hold at night" became "Boys like the girls for the beauty they hold inside"; it was also used on adult contemporary radio stations. Trainor and Kadish refused to make this version available for digital download because they believed it would "water down" the original.

== Critical reception ==
Reception toward "All About That Bass" was polarized upon its release. Some music critics viewed it as a novelty song. MTV News named "All About That Bass" the sixth-best track of 2014, while Time named it the sixth-worst of that year. Jon Caramanica of The New York Times called the song a "shimmery" and "cheeky [...] hit", but criticized Trainor's unenthusiastic and drawn-out delivery, and accused her of imitating black music. Molanphy described the lyrics as "effortlessly memorable" and complimented the production, but worried the misuse of the word "treble" in its lyrics might ruin the word's meaning for a whole generation.

The lyrics of "All About That Bass" caused controversy; some critics called the song anti-feminist and accused Trainor of shaming thin women. Kris Ex of Complex said Trainor imitated body standards often used to stereotype black women and appropriated colloquialisms that are associated with African-American Vernacular English. Alexa Camp of Slant Magazine called the song "faux empowerment" and criticized Trainor for encouraging women to rely on men's opinions for validation. McKinney said some of its lyrics promote a body-positive attitude and high self-worth while others contradict those values by denigrating other women. The Independent writer Yomi Adegoke argued the track's substitution of conventional beauty standards with new ones is a poor representation of body positivity, and was insulted by its statement men find only curvy women attractive. In response, Trainor said; "I didn't work this hard to hate on skinny people, I wrote the song to help my body confidence—and to help others". Writing for The Guardian, Sullivan and Beejoli Shah defended "All About That Bass"; Shah suggested critics were reading too much into its lyrics and that "this isn't an academic polemic on modern womanhood: it's a pop song". Ashley White of Florida Today thought the song did not shame thin women, instead interpreting its lyrical message as "no one—skinny, fat or in between—should have to feel uncomfortable or imperfect in their skin".

Entertainment Weekly's Melissa Maerz named "All About That Bass" one of the two best tracks on Title, describing it as a "boomin' booty ode". Shah praised its lyrics and bassline but felt it did not signal a long career for Trainor. Writing for Spin, Dan Weiss called the song a "fluke hit" but noted it was historic and would uplift more listeners than it offended. Sullivan stated that while the track's palatable nature and retro-inspired "cuteness" contributed to its success, the unwavering body-positive message of its lyrics was its biggest appeal. Stereogum's Chris DeVille considered criticisms of the lyrics valid but praised the "pleasant swagger" in Trainor's expressionless delivery and its joyful nature, finding it a clever update on its retro influences. Yahoo! writer Paul Grein called "All About That Bass" one of the greatest and most successful contemporaneous "message songs". Evan Sawdey of PopMatters called the song optimistic, lively, and "absolutely delightful", and concluded that it was one of the most enjoyable songs of 2014. The song appeared on both best-of and worst-of year-end lists in 2014.

=== Accolades ===
"All About That Bass" reached number 23 on The Village Voice's annual year-end Pazz & Jop critics' poll of 2014. The song was nominated for Best Song with a Social Message at the 2014 MTV Europe Music Awards and for Favorite Song at the 41st People's Choice Awards. At the 2015 Billboard Music Awards, it received three nominations, winning Top Hot 100 Song and Top Digital Song. At the 57th Annual Grammy Awards in 2015, "All About That Bass" was nominated in the categories Record of the Year and Song of the Year. The song was also nominated for the Dorian Awards, iHeartRadio Music Awards, LOS40 Music Awards, Nickelodeon Kids' Choice Awards, Radio Disney Music Awards, and the Teen Choice Awards.

== Commercial performance ==
"All About That Bass" was a sleeper hit; it debuted at number 84 on the US Billboard Hot 100 issued for July 26, 2014, and reached number one on September 20, making Trainor the 21st female artist in Billboard Hot 100 chart history to do so with her debut single. The song spent eight consecutive weeks at number one, the longest run for a female artist in 2014, and any Epic Records artist in the chart's history. During the first six weeks at number one, "All About That Bass" led an all-female top five, breaking the record for the longest time women occupied the top five. It was also the first debut single to spend at least 15 weeks in the top two and the 10th song to spend 25 weeks in the top 10. "All About That Bass" was the best-selling song by a female artist in the 2010s, selling 5.8 million digital downloads in the United States. The Recording Industry Association of America (RIAA) certified the song Diamond, which denotes 10 million units based on sales and track-equivalent on-demand streams. On the Canadian Hot 100, "All About That Bass" peaked at number one, sold 408,000 copies in the country by the end of 2014, and was later certified Diamond by Music Canada.

In the United Kingdom, "All About That Bass" accumulated 1.17 million local streams and reached number 33 on the singles chart, becoming the first song in the chart's history to reach the top 40 based on streams alone. Following its release for digital download, the song peaked at number one and sold 884,000 copies; the British Phonographic Industry (BPI) certified it 3× Platinum. It also reached number one in Australia and New Zealand, attaining 9× Platinum and 4× Platinum certifications respectively, and peaked at number one in 58 other countries, including 12 in Europe. (Note: The European countries where "All About That Bass" reached number one include, Austria, Bulgaria, Denmark, Germany, Hungary, Ireland, Poland, Scotland, Slovakia, Slovenia, Spain, Switzerland.) The song also peaked at number two in Belgium (Wallonia), Czech Republic, Israel, Norway, and South Africa; number three in the Netherlands and Sweden; number five in Belgium (Flanders) and Italy; number six in Romania; number eight in Finland and France; and number 10 in Japan.

The song received a 4× Platinum certification in Mexico, 3× Platinum in Norway, Sweden, 2× Platinum in Denmark, Italy, Spain, and Platinum in Austria, Belgium, Germany, Switzerland. According to the International Federation of the Phonographic Industry (IFPI), "All About That Bass" was the fourth best-selling song of 2014 with 11 million copies sold worldwide.

== Music video ==
=== Background and concept ===
Fatima Robinson directed the music video for "All About That Bass". Trainor described Robinson as "the best of the best" and that Robinson made her "a rock star in two days". Trainor wanted to make the video enjoyable to reflect the fun nature of the song. To that end, Robinson suggested using subdued pastel colors, which would popularize the video during summer, and depicting Trainor as an ingénue doing "booty-bumping dance moves and just shaking it up". Trainor told The Boston Globe she considered the caricature "a cartoon" that she only ever intended to portray in the video. She felt pressured to retain the look after the video became popular. The first time Trainor watched the video, she cried because she felt insecure about her appearance in it. As a result, Trainor "edited the crap out of it", changing the scenes in which she thought her face looked awkward, and said the final version made her "look like a pop star". Music website Idolator premiered it on June 10, 2014. Social media played an important role in the video's creation and marketing. Robinson cast Sione Kelepi as a dancer after discovering his popular dance videos on social media platform Vine. Kelepi shared the music video with his followers, which led to initial public interest in the video and it being recommended to more YouTube users.

=== Synopsis ===
The music video has a 1950s visual theme. Trainor is dressed in a pink sweater and long white socks while singing and dancing in front of a pink backdrop. In following scenes, she dances with female dancers and exaggerates her facial expressions. Kelepi appears throughout the video; in one scene, he pirouettes and performs a full split. Two girls are shown playing with dolls in a dollhouse, dancing in a bedroom, and riding bicycles. During a repetition of the line "I won't be no stick-figure, silicone Barbie doll", Trainor throws away a doll. Writing for Out, Stacy Lambe stated the video delivers a "retro pop world" that "makes you want to dance in your seat".

=== Reception ===
The music video for "All About That Bass" included a dance sequence and colorful sets.

Jim Farber of the New York Daily News said the discourse about Trainor's weight in the video's YouTube comment section "had taken on a life of its own". YouTube was instrumental in the success of "All About That Bass"; the video was Vevo's second-most streamed music video of 2014 while YouTube ranked it as the ninth-most popular upload of the year based on "views, shares, comments, likes", and other factors. Entertainment Weekly's Miles Raymer wrote the video's dance sequence and colorful sets were perfectly designed to attain online popularity. Grein suggested the video was most likely to win Best Video with a Social Message at the 2015 MTV Video Music Awards. Sawdey called the video "fun and buoyant" but said the song's lyrics were responsible for its popularity. Caramanica felt the video complemented the song.

USA Today writer Brian Mansfield described the clip's theme as a fusion of Sir Mix-a-Lot's "Baby Got Back" (1992) and "Beauty School Dropout" from the 1971 musical Grease. DeVille said despite its flaws, the visuals are endearing and effective. Billboard writer Andrew Hampp interpreted the video as "slyly satirical". Julie Zeilinger of the same magazine criticized it for drawing inspiration from the thin women Trainor criticizes in the song's lyrics, and noted that Trainor failed to acknowledge body diversity as a spectrum and instead depicted only its extremities. Emma Garland of Vice found the video enjoyable, cautious, and easily digestible but she criticized its choreography. Diana Cook of Cracked.com felt it displayed a double standard, saying there would be much more of a backlash if Taylor Swift created a song about men preferring smaller bodies and mocked an overweight woman eating a cupcake in its video.

Robin James and Kat George of Vice found cultural appropriation in the scene where Trainor is surrounded by black women twerking; according to James, Trainor appropriates "respectable chubbiness" to improve her own body image. The Fader's Larry Fitzmaurice shared a similar opinion and placed the video third in his list of "Music's 8 Most Cringe-Worthy Acts Of Cultural Appropriation In 2014".

== Live performances ==
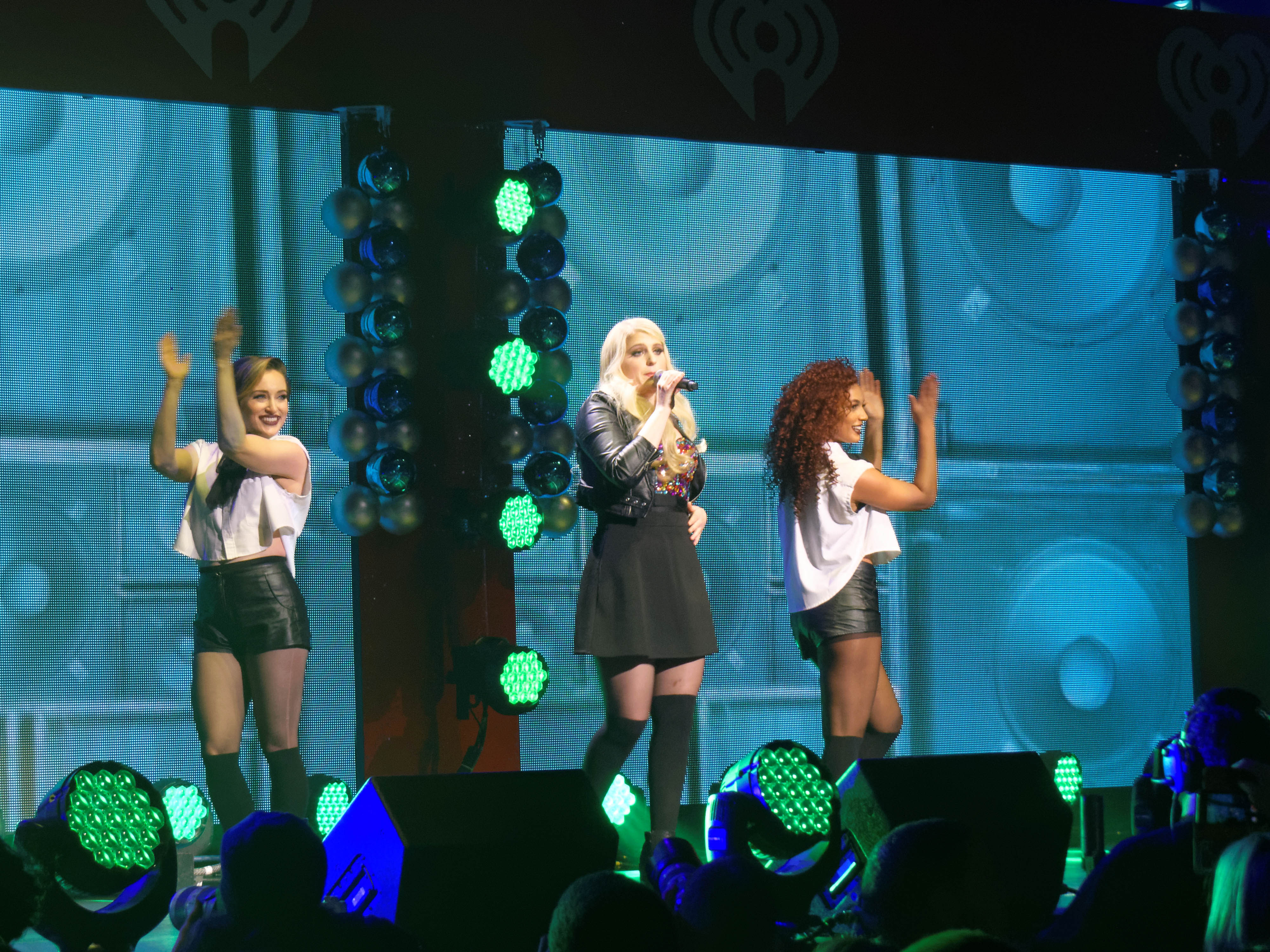
Trainor performing "All About That Bass" during the Jingle Ball Tour on December 10, 2014

Trainor performed an acoustic rendition of "All About That Bass" at an Emily West concert in Nashville on July 16, 2014, after West saw Trainor in the audience and insisted she perform. Trainor reprised the song on Live! with Kelly and Michael on August 7. She sang an acoustic ukulele version of the song on Entertainment Tonight that was posted to their website the following month. Two days later, Trainor performed "All About That Bass" on The Tonight Show Starring Jimmy Fallon, with Fallon and the Roots, who used classroom instruments. Rolling Stone writer Ryan Reed commented the unlikely arrangement maintained the quality of the original version with its "sparse percussion and intimate doo-wop harmonies" supporting her impassioned delivery. On September 11, Trainor reprised the song on The Ellen DeGeneres Show. On September 15, she sang it on The X Factor Australia. Trainor performed a mashup of "All About That Bass" and Taylor Swift's "Shake It Off" (2014) for Australian radio station 2Day FM; Billboard published this performance on September 18. A journalist from the magazine, Erin Strecker, wrote it was unsurprising a mashup of "two super-catchy tracks" was also catchy.

Trainor reprised "All About That Bass" as a duet with American singer Miranda Lambert at the Country Music Association Awards on November 5; the two singers wore little dresses and Trainor wore a Nasty Gal jacket over hers. Lambert praised the song's message in an interview and recalled playing it before every performance on her Platinum Tour (2014–2016). On November 26, Trainor sang a medley of "All About That Bass" and "Lips Are Movin" (2014) on the finale of the nineteenth season of American television series Dancing with the Stars. She included the former song in her set list for the Jingle Ball Tour 2014.

On the final episode of The X Factor UK's eleventh series, Trainor performed the song with finalists Andrea Faustini, Fleur East and Ben Haenow. She included "All About That Bass" on the setlists of her 2015 That Bass and MTrain concert tours, as well as her 2016 The Untouchable Tour. Trainor reprised the song on November 22, 2018, while wearing "a glittery jersey and sparkly blue pants" at a Dallas Cowboys and Washington Redskins game, which launched The Salvation Army's 128th annual Red Kettle Campaign. She also performed it while headlining the Philadelphia Welcome America Festival as part of the 2019 Fourth of July celebrations. On January 8, 2020, Trainor sang the lyrics of "All About That Bass" over the "creeping, insidious beat" of Billie Eilish's "Bad Guy" (2019) for BBC Radio 1's game "Your Lyrics Different Song", which Billboard's Glenn Rowley considered an impressive and successful rendition. She reprised the song with Kelly Clarkson on the latter's show on April 29, 2024, to celebrate its 10-year anniversary, and two months later at iHeartRadio's Can't Cancel Pride 2024 with the Gay Men's Chorus of Los Angeles and Capital's Summertime Ball 2024. Trainor included it on the set list of her 2024 concert tour, the Timeless Tour.

== Cultural impact ==
Josh Duboff of Vanity Fair stated "All About That Bass" achieved "pop-cultural touchstone-status" while The New York Times's Joe Coscarelli called it "a cultural phenomenon". Vogue cited the song's impact and said in a 2014 article; "We're Officially in the Era of the Big Booty". Steven J. Horowitz of Billboard wrote "All About That Bass", along with Jennifer Lopez's "Booty" (2014), helped "booty records" make a commercial return to the mainstream. The song's stay at number one in the United Kingdom coincided with the number-three debut of Nicki Minaj's "Anaconda", which The Guardian and The Independent dubbed "the battle of the booty songs". Rolling Stone's Steve Knopper wrote; "if we assume the latest sing-about-your-butt trend in pop music has finally reached its, uh, conclusion, the unquestionable winner is Meghan Trainor's 'All About That Bass'". According to Sullivan, the three songs reflect a change in pop culture, in which female artists frequently endured criticism from society for their weight, while Adegoke wrote the songs helped curves reach culture's forefront. In November, American company Booty Pop reported a 47% increase in demand; New York doctor Matthew Schulman told Billboard demand for Brazilian buttock augmentation surgery had risen by 25% at his practice in 2014, and Boston entrepreneur and gym instructor Kelly Brabants stated she experienced a waiting list for her Booty by Brabants class because "it's not about being stick-thin anymore, every girl now wants a booty"; Billboard attributed this to the three songs.

According to Sullivan, "All About That Bass" resulted in Trainor being viewed as "the poster girl for the larger woman" and "pop's emblem of self-acceptance". Billboard wrote the song's success made Trainor a "breakthrough star virtually overnight" and one of the "biggest breakout stars" of 2014. In a press release, Trainor recalled meeting female fans who told her: "I've hated myself. I hated life. I didn't want to go to school. I get bullied. And then I heard your song and I cried". The song's success led Sony/ATV Music Publishing to sign Kadish in October; the publishing company's CEO Martin Bandier stated the track is "clearly one of the biggest songs of the year and we know there is a lot more to come from him".

=== Parodies ===
The success of "All About That Bass" spawned viral parody music videos. In November, a Thanksgiving-themed parody of the song called "All About That Baste" accumulated over four million views in its first month of release by The Holderness Family. The lyric "no treble" was replaced with "more butter", which Fox News interpreted as a reference to the original song's message about body positivity. On December 1, 2014, the cast of Canadian television comedy series This Hour Has 22 Minutes made a parody version titled "Just a Pretty Face", which was released as a Conservative Party political advertisement that criticized the Federal Liberal Party leader Justin Trudeau. On December 7, 2014, Nerdist Industries released a parody titled "All About That Base: No Rebels", which was performed by Team Unicorn. The video, which has a Star Wars theme, depicts men dressed as stormtroopers dancing with cheerleaders whose costumes were inspired by the Star Wars character Darth Vader. Mitchell Peters of Billboard said it is memorable and humorous. On December 12, 2014, a parody music video by NASA entitled "All About That Space" went viral. The video, which depicts NASA interns dancing and includes images of the Johnson Space Center, accrued over one million views within four days and was dubbed "wonderfully a-dork-able" by Lee Moran of the New York Daily News.

The many parodies and homages led to Time publishing an article titled "No More 'All About That Bass' Parodies, Please" on December 15, 2014. In it, Daniel D'Addario attributed the song's popularity among parodists to its hook's emphasis on the words "bass" and "treble", which are easy to rhyme, and Trainor's impassioned delivery on it. In early 2016, on The Late Late Show with James Corden, Trainor and Corden performed a parody of "All About That Bass" about failed New Year's resolutions.

=== Cover versions ===
The Roots covered "All About That Bass" on The Tonight Show Starring Jimmy Fallon on August 20, 2014; Chris Payne of Billboard called the performance "angelic". Maejor's remix of the song featured Justin Bieber, and it was released on October 15. In September, Kate Davis released a 1940s-jazz-style version of the song, on which she played double bass with pianist Scott Bradlee; within three months, it had received 8 million views on Bradlee's Postmodern Jukebox YouTube channel. On October 24, Avi Kaplan, a member of the American group Pentatonix, released his cover version of "All About That Bass"; James Grebey of Spin gave the cover a positive review and said the song "sounds very different a few octaves lower" and that Kaplan's rendition "might just be an improvement". Jamaican-American singer Anita Antoinette covered the song on the seventh season of the American talent television series The Voice, receiving praise by the show's judges Pharrell Williams and Adam Levine. Ashley Lee of Billboard wrote Antoinette provided the song with "a reggae twist". Cover versions of the song recorded by Power Music Workout and Meghan Tonjes reached number 13 and number 70 on the UK Singles Chart, respectively.

== Formats and track listings ==
- Digital download
1. "All About That Bass" – 3:08
- CD single
1. "All About That Bass" – 3:08
2. "Title" – 2:54
- Digital EP
1. "All About That Bass" – 3:09
2. "Title" – 2:54
3. "Dear Future Husband" – 3:04
4. "Close Your Eyes" – 3:40

== Credits and personnel ==
Credits adapted from the liner notes of Title.

=== Recording locations ===
- Recorded and engineered at The Carriage House, Nolensville, Tennessee
- Mastered at The Mastering Palace (New York City)
- Published by Year Of The Dog Music (ASCAP), a division of Big Yellow Dog, LLC / Over-Thought Under-Appreciated Songs (ASCAP)

=== Personnel ===
- Meghan Trainor – songwriter, vocals, clapping, percussion
- Kevin Kadish – songwriter, producer, drum programming, electric guitar, bass, sound design, mixing, recording, engineering
- David Baron – piano, baritone saxophone, Hammond organ
- Dave Kutch – mastering

== Charts ==
=== Weekly charts ===
Weekly chart performance
Chart (2014–2015)	Peak position
Australia (ARIA)	1
Austria (Ö3 Austria Top 40)	1
Belgium (Ultratop 50 Flanders)	5
Belgium (Ultratop 50 Wallonia)	2
Brazil (Billboard Hot 100)	41
Bulgaria (IFPI)	1
Canada Hot 100 (Billboard)	1
Canada AC (Billboard)	1
Canada CHR/Top 40 (Billboard)	1
Canada Hot AC (Billboard)	1
Czech Republic Airplay (ČNS IFPI)	2
Czech Republic Singles Digital (ČNS IFPI)	3
Denmark (Tracklisten)	1
Euro Digital Song Sales (Billboard)	1
Finland (Suomen virallinen lista)	8
France (SNEP)	8
Germany (GfK)	1
Greece Digital Song Sales (Billboard)	2
Hungary (Rádiós Top 40)	13
Hungary (Single Top 40)	1
Iceland (Tónlistinn)	2
Ireland (IRMA)	1
Israel (Media Forest)	2
Italy (FIMI)	5
Japan Hot 100 (Billboard)	10
Luxembourg Digital Song Sales (Billboard)	1
Mexico (Billboard Mexican Airplay)	1
Mexico Anglo (Monitor Latino)	1
Netherlands (Dutch Top 40)	3
Netherlands (Single Top 100)	2
New Zealand (Recorded Music NZ)	1
Norway (VG-lista)	2
Poland (Polish Airplay Top 100)	1
Poland (Dance Top 50)	10
Portugal Digital Songs (Billboard)	2
Romania (Airplay 100)	6
Scottish Singles Sales (Official Charts)	1
Slovakia Airplay (ČNS IFPI)	1
Slovakia Singles Digital (ČNS IFPI)	3
Slovenia (SloTop50)	1
South Africa (EMA)	2
Spain (Promusicae)	1
Sweden (Sverigetopplistan)	3
Switzerland (Schweizer Hitparade)	1
UK Singles (Official Charts)	1
US Billboard Hot 100	1
US Adult Contemporary (Billboard)	7
US Adult Pop Airplay (Billboard)	2
US Dance Club Songs (Billboard)	13
US Dance Airplay (Billboard)	4
US Latin Airplay (Billboard)	29
US Pop Airplay (Billboard)	1
US Rhythmic Airplay (Billboard)	8
Venezuela (Record Report)	81

=== Year-end charts ===
Year-end chart performance
Chart (2014)	Position
Australia (ARIA)	2
Austria (Ö3 Austria Top 40)	18
Belgium (Ultratop Flanders)	62
Belgium (Ultratop Wallonia)	72
Canada (Canadian Hot 100)	7
Denmark (Tracklisten)	23
Germany (Official German Charts)	12
Hungary (Rádiós Top 40)	82
Hungary (Single Top 40)	33
Ireland (IRMA)	8
Italy (FIMI)	32
Japan Adult Contemporary (Billboard)	44
Netherlands (Dutch Top 40)	27
Netherlands (Single Top 100)	24
New Zealand (Recorded Music NZ)	2
Poland (ZPAV)	30
Slovenia (SloTop50)	34
Spain (PROMUSICAE)	12
Sweden (Sverigetopplistan)	36
Switzerland (Schweizer Hitparade)	19
Ukraine Airplay (Tophit)	191
UK Singles (Official Charts Company)	8
US Billboard Hot 100	8
US Adult Contemporary (Billboard)	40
US Adult Top 40 (Billboard)	21
US Dance/Mix Show Airplay (Billboard)	46
US Mainstream Top 40 (Billboard)	15

Year-end chart performance
Chart (2015)	Position
Belgium (Ultratop Wallonia)	66
Brazil (Crowley)	80
Canada (Canadian Hot 100)	36
Hungary (Single Top 40)	37
Italy (FIMI)	94
Japan (Japan Hot 100)	65
Slovenia (SloTop50)	7
Spain (PROMUSICAE)	64
Switzerland (Schweizer Hitparade)	57
UK Singles (Official Charts Company)	77
US Billboard Hot 100	28
US Adult Contemporary (Billboard)	24

2016 year-end chart position
Chart (2016)	Position
Slovenia (SloTop50)	44

=== Decade-end charts ===
Decade-end chart performance
Chart (2010–2019)	Position
Australia (ARIA)	62
US Billboard Hot 100	17

== Certifications ==
Certifications
Region	Certification	Certified units/sales
Australia (ARIA)	11× Platinum	770,000^{‡}
Austria (IFPI Austria)	Platinum	30,000^{*}
Belgium (BRMA)	Platinum	20,000^{‡}
Brazil (Pro-Música Brasil)	3× Diamond	750,000^{‡}
Canada (Music Canada)	Diamond	800,000^{‡}
Denmark (IFPI Danmark)	2× Platinum	120,000^{^}
Germany (BVMI)	3× Gold	600,000^{‡}
Italy (FIMI)	2× Platinum	60,000^{‡}
Mexico (AMPROFON)	Diamond+Platinum+Gold	390,000^{‡}
New Zealand (RMNZ)	4× Platinum	60,000^{*}
Norway (IFPI Norway)	3× Platinum	120,000^{‡}
Spain (Promusicae)	2× Platinum	80,000^{‡}
Sweden (GLF)	5× Platinum	200,000^{‡}
Switzerland (IFPI Switzerland)	Platinum	30,000^{^}
United Kingdom (BPI)	3× Platinum	1,800,000^{‡}
United States (RIAA)	Diamond	10,000,000^{‡}
Streaming
Denmark (IFPI Danmark)	Platinum	2,600,000^{†}
Spain (Promusicae)	Gold	4,000,000^{†}
^{*} Sales figures based on certification alone.^{^} Shipments figures based on certification alone.^{‡} Sales+streaming figures based on certification alone.^{†} Streaming-only figures based on certification alone.

== Radio and release history ==
Release dates and format(s) for "All About That Bass"
Region	Date	Format	Label	Ref.
Austria	June 30, 2014	Digital download	Epic	
Germany	June 30, 2014	Digital download	Epic	
Switzerland	June 30, 2014	Digital download	Epic	
United States	June 30, 2014	Digital download; streaming	Epic	
United States	July 1, 2014	Contemporary hit radio	Epic	
United Kingdom	August 14, 2014	Streaming	Epic	
Italy	September 5, 2014	Radio airplay	Sony	
United Kingdom	September 28, 2014	Digital download	Epic	
Austria	October 3, 2014	Digital extended play (EP)	Epic	
Germany	October 3, 2014	Digital extended play (EP)	Epic	
Switzerland	October 3, 2014	Digital extended play (EP)	Epic	
Germany	October 3, 2014	CD single	Epic	

== See also ==
- List of best-selling singles
- List of Canadian Hot 100 number-one singles of 2014
- List of Billboard Hot 100 number-one singles of 2014
- List of Billboard Mainstream Top 40 number-one songs of 2014
- List of highest-certified singles in Australia
- List of number-one hits of 2014 (Austria)
- List of number-one hits of 2014 (Denmark)
- List of number-one hits of 2014 (Germany)
- List of number-one hits of 2014 (Scotland)
- List of number-one hits of 2014 (Switzerland)
- List of number-one singles from the 2010s (New Zealand)
- List of number-one singles of 2014 (Australia)
- List of number-one singles of 2014 (Ireland)
- List of number-one singles of 2014 (Poland)
- List of number-one singles of 2014 (Spain)
- List of number-one songs of 2014 (Mexico)
- List of top 10 singles in 2014 (France)
- List of UK Singles Chart number ones of the 2010s
