= Scott Bradlee =

American musician (born 1981)

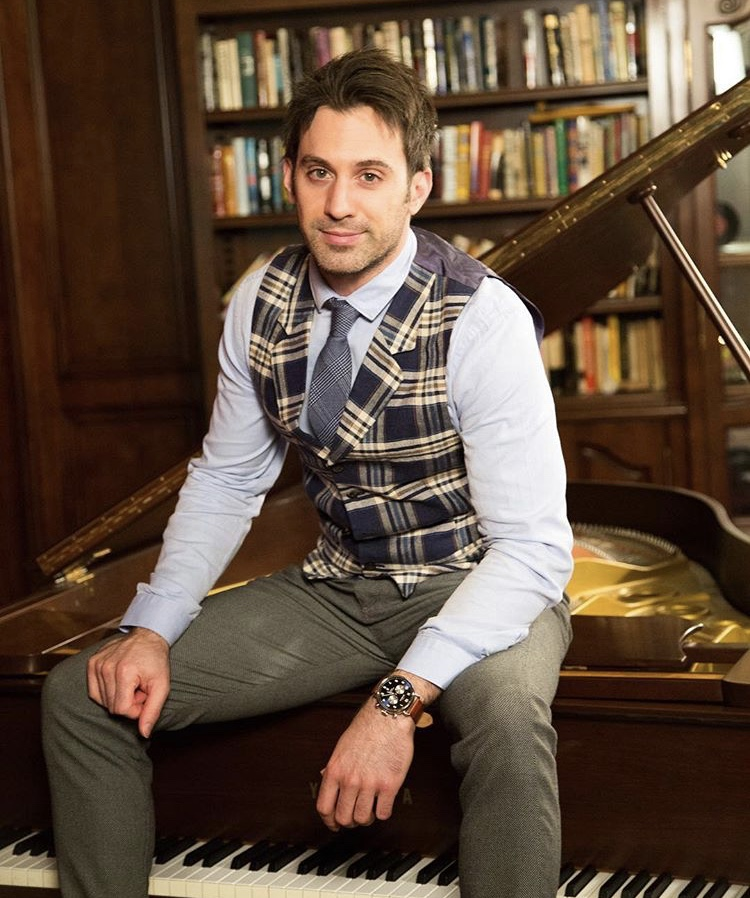
- Bradlee in 2018

Background information
- Born: September 19, 1981 (age 44); Long Island, New York
- Genres: Jazz, ragtime, swing
- Occupations: Musician, pianist, arranger
- Instruments: Piano, keyboards, guitar, bass, vocals

Scott Bradlee (born September 19, 1981) is an American musician, pianist, and arranger. He is best known for his viral videos on YouTube, including his work under the moniker Postmodern Jukebox (PMJ) — an ever-evolving, revolving collective of performers playing popular music in period styles.

== Biography ==
Bradlee grew up in the Pattenburg section of Union Township, Hunterdon County, New Jersey where he fell in love with jazz at the age of 12 after hearing George Gershwin's Rhapsody in Blue for the first time. He attended North Hunterdon High School and later the University of Hartford.

Bradlee became a successful performer in the New York jazz scene, and served as music director for an interactive, off-Broadway theater experience called Sleep No More.

In looking for creative inspiration, Bradlee began reworking popular music as an exercise. In 2009, he released "Hello My Ragtime '80s," which incorporated ragtime-style piano into popular music from the 1980s. After playing and experimenting on stage at his regular gig at Robert Restaurant, he released the compilation Mashups by Candlelight. Bradlee gained popularity in 2012 with A Motown Tribute to Nickelback, a collaboration with local musicians which arranged Nickelback's songs in the style of 1960s style R&B music.

In 2013, Bradlee worked more seriously on forming Postmodern Jukebox, a rotating group of musicians producing covers of pop songs in alternate styles, including jazz, ragtime, and swing. The group burst onto the public radar with their doo-wop cover of Miley Cyrus's "We Can't Stop", featuring Robyn Adele Anderson and guest artists, The Tee-Tones. As the viral surge grew, Bradlee was interviewed by news outlets such as NPR and also performed live on Good Morning America and Fuse. The group visited Cosmopolitan magazine's New York office for a year-end review of their work and popular songs from the year.

Several artists have publicly noted their appreciation for the group's work. Among the group's prominent guest musicians are Dave Koz, who collaborated with them in jazz covers of "Careless Whisper" and the Game of Thrones theme music, and Niia, who joined them for a "space jazz" version of "The End of the World". Postmodern Jukebox's October 2013 collaboration with Puddles Pity Party on a cover of Lorde's "Royals" generated particularly strong interest; as of June 2020, this video remained among the five most popular on Bradlee's YouTube channel with over 28.6 million hits.

In 2013, Bradlee found interest from the video game industry, gaining a composer credit for 2K Games' BioShock Infinite soundtrack, which features four of his stylized arrangements: a piano cover of Tears for Fears' "Everybody Wants to Rule the World" (piano and vocals), a jazzy ragtime cover of Gloria Jones' "Tainted Love" (arrangement, piano), and covers of R.E.M.'s "Shiny Happy People" (arrangement and piano) and "After You’ve Gone" (arrangement, piano).

In early September 2014, Bradlee uploaded a 1940s jazz interpretation of "All About That Bass" called "All About That (Upright) Bass", featuring Kate Davis singing solo while playing double bass, with Bradlee on piano and Dave Tedeschi on drums. The video received 8 million hits in three months. Also in 2014, Bradlee's YouTube Channel "Postmodern Jukebox" was listed as #42 on NewMediaRockstars' "Top 100 Channels".

In late 2014 to 2015, Postmodern Jukebox toured extensively through America and Europe with its rotating cast of musical contributors. On Feb. 24th, Postmodern Jukebox co-headlined the Dubai Jazz Festival, alongside Sting, Toto, Chris Botti, and David Gray. On February 26, the band kicked off a 75-date international tour at Vicar Street in Dublin, Ireland, wrapping on June 4 in Ankara, Turkey.

In early February 2016, Bradlee and Postmodern Jukebox covered the late David Bowie’s classic song "Heroes" in honor of World Cancer Day – featuring vocals by Nicole Atkins. The track became one of his most popular arrangements to date and was sold on iTunes to earn money for the Cancer Research Institute. In 2016, Heineken announced their global partnership with Formula One racing management and in September released its first "If You Drive, Never Drink" campaign commercial featuring Sir Jackie Stewart (the "Flying Scot”) which featured Bradlee's cover of “Heroes” as the soundtrack.

In 2016, Adweek featured Bradlee as one of "20 Content Creators Who Are Setting the Bar for Creativity in 2016."

On June 12, 2018, Scott Bradlee released his first book, a memoir entitled Outside The Jukebox: How I Turned My Vintage Music Obsession Into My Dream Gig (Hachette Books). The book garnered rave reviews from artists such as Kristin Chenoweth and Mick Fleetwood, as well as features from Publishers Weekly, The Weekly Standard, and Billboard. Scott performed a series of special intimate Book Release Parties during the book's release week in Los Angeles, Washington D.C., New York, and his hometown of Flemington, NJ.

== Postmodern Jukebox ==
Postmodern Jukebox
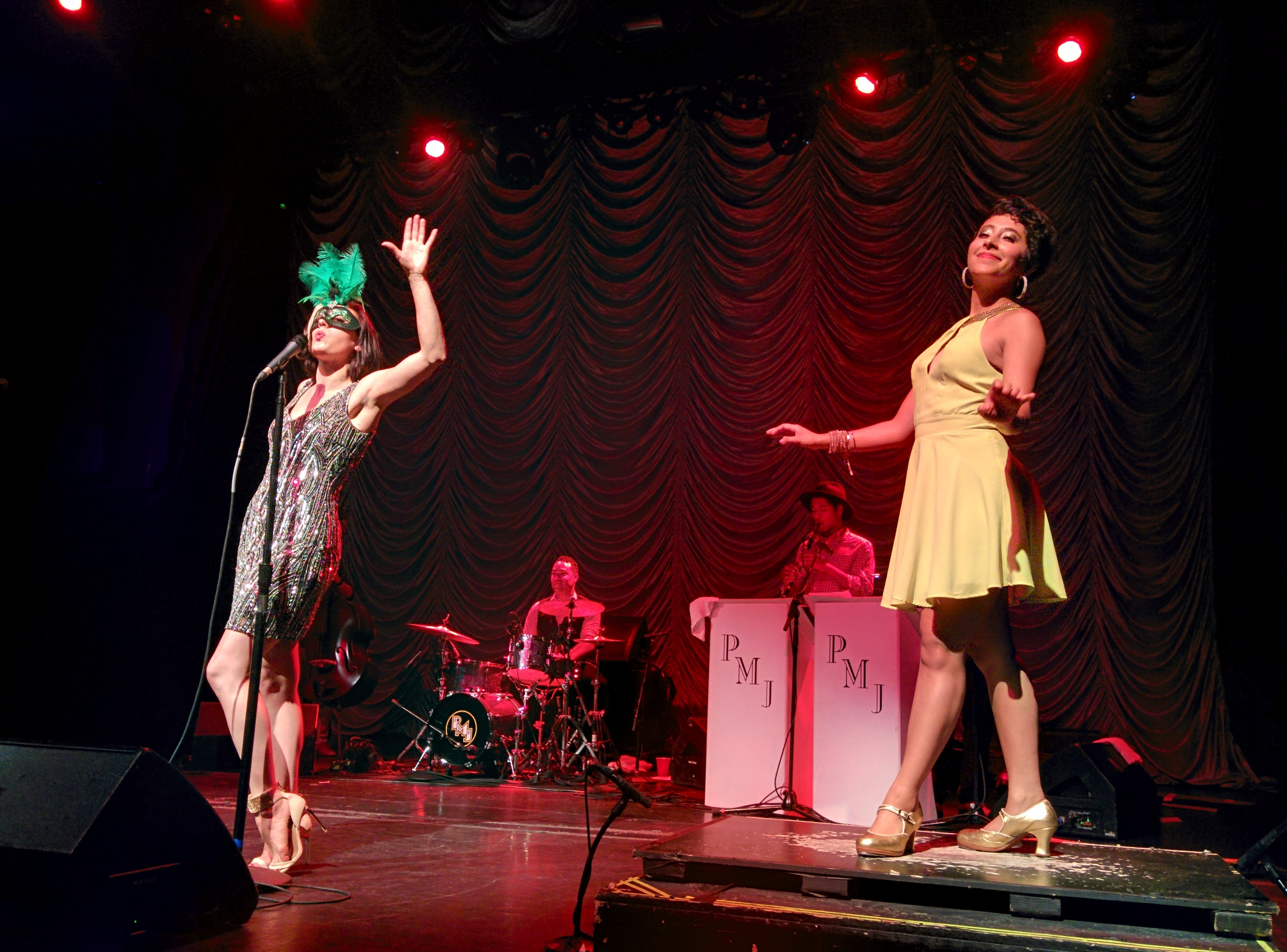
- Ariana Savalas and Sarah Reich perform "Bad Romance" at The Regency Ballroom

Background information
- Origin: New York City, New York
- Genres: Jazz, ragtime, swing
- Years active: 2011-present
- Members: See list
- Website: Postmodern Jukebox

Bradlee's most notable work to date has been with the collective he created - Postmodern Jukebox. He posts weekly covers of recent pop songs with jazz or other genre variations. As of May 2023, the Postmodern Jukebox YouTube channel has over 5.95 million subscribers and has surpassed 1.9 billion views.

Each week, Postmodern Jukebox puts out a new video on YouTube, most of which are filmed casually in Bradlee's living room. The band has covered songs by artists ranging from Lady Gaga and The Strokes to Katy Perry and the White Stripes. Since their beginnings as a small group of friends making music in a basement in Queens, New York, Postmodern Jukebox has gone on to feature 70 different performers and tour six continents.

== Discography ==
=== Albums ===
Scott Bradlee
Year	Album	Peak chart positions			Notes
Year	Album	Jazz Albums	Top Heatseekers	Top Independent Albums	Notes
2006	An evening with The Sesha Loop	—	—	—	The Sesha Loop
2012	Mashups by Candlelight	—	—	—	
2013	A Motown Tribute to Nickelback	—	—	—	
2013	Mashups by Candlelight, Vol. 2	—	—	—	
2013	Introducing Postmodern Jukebox (EP)	8	31	—	
2014	Twist Is the New Twerk	4	7	48	
2014	Clubbin' with Grandpa	4	—	—	
2014	Saturday Morning Slow Jams	—	—	—	
2014	Historical Misappropriation	3	7	43	#20 on Billboard Jazz Albums: Year End 2015.
2014	A Very Postmodern Christmas	7	22	—	
2015	Selfies on Kodachrome	6	—	—	
2015	Emoji Antique	8	—	—	
2015	Swipe Right for Vintage	5	19	—	
2015	Top Hat on Fleek	6	20	—	
2016	PMJ and Chill	—	—	—	
2016	Swing the Vote!	—	—	—	
2016	PMJ Is for Lovers (The Love Song Collection)	—	—	—	
2016	Squad Goals	—	—	—	
2017	33 Resolutions Per Minute	—	—	—	
2017	Fake Blues	—	—	—	
2020	Postmodern Jukebox at the Piano	—	—	—	
