= Tim Kubart =

American actor and musician (born 1984)

- Also known as: Tambourine Guy
- Born: July 25, 1984 (age 41)
- Occupations: Actor, musician
- Website: timkubart.com

Tim Kubart (born July 25, 1984) is an American actor and musician.

== Career ==
In 2016, Kubart won the Grammy Award for Best Children's Album for his album Home. Kubart was the host of Sprout's Sunny Side Up, which in 2015 enjoyed a guest appearance from Michelle Obama. He is also known as the energetic Tambourine Guy, a long running cast member of Scott Bradlee's Postmodern Jukebox.

In May 2018, Kubart released a children's book titled Oopsie-Do, illustrated by Lori Richmond. In September 2018, he released the album Building Blocks.

== Filmography ==
=== Film ===
Year	Title	Role	Notes
2009	Why George?	Chinese Food Delivery Boy	
2011	What Happens Next	Young Paul	Uncredited
2014	Grand Street	Fratboy	

=== Television ===
Year	Title	Role	Notes
2005	As the World Turns	Max	2 episodes
2007	Law & Order: SVU	Kevin	Episode: "Dependent"
2007	Guiding Light	Wyatt	2 episodes
2009–2010	Haute & Bothered	Spencer	4 episodes
2013–2016	The Sunny Side Up Show	Tim	92 episodes
