= Kate Davis =

American singer-songwriter (born 1991)

- Born: February 4, 1991 (age 35); West Linn, Oregon, U.S
- Genres: Pop, jazz
- Occupations: Musician, singer, songwriter
- Instruments: Vocals, bass, guitar
- Years active: 2008–present
- Labels: Solitaire, ANTI-
- Website: katedavismusic.com

Kathryn L. "Kate" Davis (born February 4, 1991) is an American singer, songwriter, and bassist.

== Early life ==
Davis started learning music on the violin. She moved to the Pacific Northwest in middle school and began to study the double bass. She played violin and bass in the Portland Youth Philharmonic. She was named a Presidential Scholar in the Arts in 2009, as part of the Presidential Scholars Program, through the YoungArts national arts scholarship program while at West Linn High School in West Linn, Oregon.

== Music career ==
=== Early jazz releases ===
Davis released the album Introducing Kate Davis in 2008. She enrolled at the Manhattan School of Music in 2009, concentrating on jazz and classic American songs, releasing a Christmas album in 2009 and a live album in 2010. She collaborated with guitarist Gabe Schnider and drummer Conor Szymanski, these songs can heard on Michael Feinstein's NPR show Song Travels. In 2012, she was recognized by ASCAP with the Robert Alan Award for new songwriters.

In 2014, Davis was recognized by MTV as one of the "Fifteen Fresh Females to Rule Pop" in 2014. In September 2014, Davis sang a cover version of "All About That Bass" by Meghan Trainor while playing double bass for Scott Bradlee's Postmodern Jukebox video channel; Bradlee played piano and Dave Tedeschi played drums on their 1940s jazz-style interpretation, called "All About That (Upright) Bass". After three months on YouTube their version had received eight million hits.

In December 2014, Davis appeared on PBS News Hour to perform and to talk about her career. While discussing the cover version she has said that learning the double bass was difficult, but after learning songs from the Great American Songbook, she was able to translate that knowledge to create her own style.

In January 2015, Davis appeared on the PBS special American Voices with Renée Fleming. She stepped in at the last minute for Grammy-winner Kurt Elling when he became ill with laryngitis and couldn't perform.

=== A change of direction to rock ===
In 2019 Kate Davis relaunched her career as an indie rock musician with the release of the album Trophy. The album was a result of collaboration with producer Tim Bright.

Her next album was a complete cover of Retired Boxer by outsider artist Daniel Johnston. She posted "Oh No" to SoundCloud as the lead single in November 2020. The album titled Strange Boy was released in early 2021 and benefited the mental health charity Hi How Are You Project.

In 2022, Davis released a new original song "Consequences". The album Fish Bowl followed in March 2023.

== Discography ==
=== Studio albums ===
- Introducing Kate Davis (2008)
- A Kate Davis Holiday (2009)
- Trophy (Solitaire, 2019)
- Strange Boy (Solitaire, 2021)
- Fish Bowl (Anti-, 2023)

=== Live albums ===
- Live at Jimmy Mak's (2010)

=== As featured artist ===
Year	Song	Album
2014	"All About That Bass" (Scott Bradlee & Postmodern Jukebox feat. Kate Davis)	Historical Misappropriation
2019	"My Baby Just Cares For Me"	Five Feet Apart: Original Motion Picture Soundtrack

=== As composer or session musician ===
Year	Subject	Collaborator	Comment
2019	Remind Me Tomorrow	Sharon Van Etten	co-writer of the song "Seventeen"

== Music videos ==
Year	Song	Director(s)	Album
2014	"All About That Bass"^{[A]}		Historical Misappropriation
2019	"Rbbts"	Zach Eisen	Trophy
2019	"Cloud"	Tim Bright	Trophy
2019	"Open Heart"	Kate Davis and Tim Bright	Trophy
2019	"Trophy"	Holden Brown	Trophy
2020	"Daisy"	Joseph Hung	Trophy
2021	"I’ll Do Everything But Breakdance For Ya, Darling"	Gizel Florez	Strange Boy
2021	"True Love Will Find You in the End"	Callum Scott-Dyson	Strange Boy
2022	"Consequences"	Sarah Sheikh Bridge and Molly Dario	Fish Bowl
2023	"Monster Mash"		Fish Bowl
2023	"Call Home"	Sarah Sheikh Bridge and Molly Dario	Fish Bowl
2023	"Long Long Long"	Sarah Sheikh Bridge and Molly Dario	Fish Bowl
2023	"Fish Bowl"	Austin Goodwin	Fish Bowl

Notes

- A Scott Bradlee & Postmodern Jukebox feat. Kate Davis
