= Von Smith =

American singer

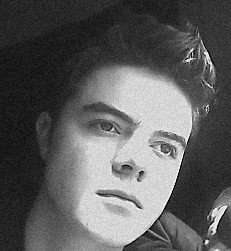
- Von Smith in 2010

Background information
- Born: Vaughn Lee Smith; June 15, 1986 (age 40); Kansas City, Missouri, United States
- Genres: Pop, R&B
- Occupations: Singer-songwriter, youtube personality
- Instrument: Vocals
- Years active: 2006–present
- Labels: Kon Live Distribution (2006–2009)
- Website: vonsmithofficial.com

Vaughn Lee "Von" Smith (born June 15, 1986) is an American singer and internet personality. Smith gained success via his YouTube videos. These garnered national attention, which led to an appearance on The View in February 2007. He soon signed a recording contract with Kon Live Distribution. In 2009 he auditioned for the eighth season of American Idol getting into the Top 36. In 2012 he was featured in the season finale of the Opening Act reality talent show.

== Career ==
In 2009 Smith auditioned for the eighth season of American Idol, with mixed reviews from the judges. However, they accepted him for the Hollywood Round. During the Hollywood Round, Smith's version of "If the Rain Must Fall" caused Simon Cowell to call it "indulgent nonsense". The other judges overlooked Simon's comment, and accepted Smith into the Top 36. He was eliminated on March 4, 2009, after singing "You're All I Need to Get By", but was brought back to wild card performance on March 5, picking "Sorry Seems to Be the Hardest Word" as his next song, but was eliminated once again.

Week #	Theme	Song choice	Original artist
Audition	N/A	"Over the Rainbow"	Judy Garland
Hollywood	First Solo	"If the Rain Must Fall"	James Morrison
Hollywood	Second Solo	"Sir Duke"	Stevie Wonder
Top 36/Group 3	Billboard Hot 100	"You're All I Need to Get By"	Marvin Gaye & Tammi Terrell
Wild Card	N/A	"Sorry Seems to Be the Hardest Word"	Elton John

In the fall of 2010 he appeared in the concert revue for the Record: Quentin Tarantino in Los Angeles, presented by ROCKLA for Show at Barre. It ran from August to October and also starred Jenna Leigh Green, Autumn Reeser, Ty Taylor, and Audra Mae. Then from November 2010 through January 2011 Smith starred in Show at Barre's For The Record: John Hughes. Also starring Barrett Foa, Tracie Thoms and Ty Taylor.

In 2012 Smith was featured in the season finale of the Opening Act reality talent show, performing as the opening act at Lady Gaga's Brisbane, Australia, show on June 14, 2012.

Smith has also been involved with Postmodern Jukebox, performing covers of popular songs re-imagined into vintage genres including Magic!'s reggae styled, "Rude", which was arranged into a 1950s sock-hop version with backing by Robyn Adele Anderson and Jen Kipley.
