= Aubrey Logan =

American singer-songwriter

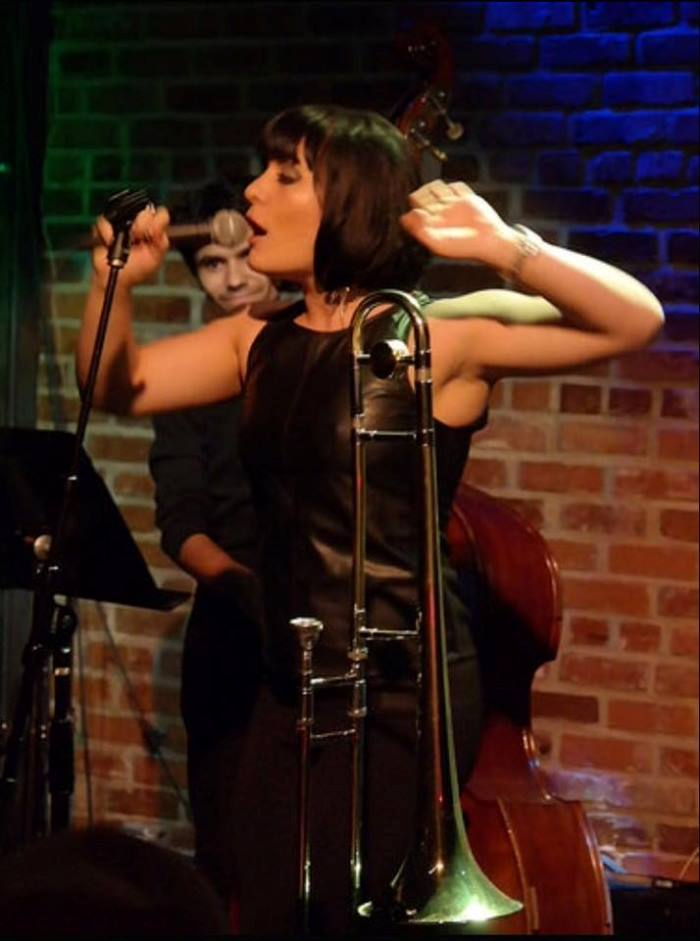
- Aubrey Logan performing in 2016

Background information
- Birth name: Aubrey Michelle Logan
- Born: January 16, 1988 (age 37) Bellevue, Washington, U.S.
- Genres: Pop; jazz; showtunes
- Occupations: Singer; songwriter; musician
- Instrument(s): Trombone, vocals
- Labels: Gold Label Artists
- Website: aubreylogan.com

Aubrey Michelle Logan (born January 16, 1988) is an American pop and jazz singer and trombone soloist. Logan won the Audience's Choice Award and the Jury's First Place Award at the 2009 Shure-Montreux Jazz Festival in Switzerland. She was also an American Idol contestant in 2009, but was eliminated in the early rounds. She is a featured artist for Postmodern Jukebox, and the Dave Koz band.

== Background ==
The daughter of music teachers, Logan was a singer, dancer and actress. While attending a new middle school, she discovered that her new friends had a different lunch period because they were in the band program. Eventually, Logan told her mother that she wasn't enjoying school and her mother approached the school's band director. When the band director asked what instrument she played, the answer was, "Nothing, but she sings and can read music." Logan was accepted, as long as she agreed not to choose the flute as her instrument. She enjoyed bands with brass sections like the James Brown Band and Chicago, and having no interest in the flute, she chose the trombone.

Logan graduated from the Berklee College of Music in 2010. The same year, she married fellow alumnus Chris Knight.

== Discography ==
=== As primary artist ===
Aubrey Logan
Year	Album	Peak chart positions			Notes
Year	Album	Jazz Albums	Top Heatseekers	Contemporary Jazz Albums	Notes
2017	Impossible	13	—	—	Debut solo album release Sept. 1, 2017
2019	Where The Sunshine Is Expensive	—	—	1	April 27, 2019 - three weeks on chart
2021	Standard				Released on MWO Records

=== As featured artist ===
Year	Album	Peak chart positions					Notes
Year	Album	Traditional Jazz Albums	Jazz Albums	Top Heatseekers	Contemporary Jazz Albums	Billboard 200	Notes
2015	Swipe Right For Vintage	—	5	19	—	—	12. "Bad Blood"; Scott Bradlee's Postmodern Jukebox
2015	Top Hat On Fleek	—	6	20	—	—	3. "Give It Away"; Scott Bradlee's Postmodern Jukebox
2016	PMJ And Chill	—	10	—	—	—	8. "Here"; Scott Bradlee's Postmodern Jukebox
2016	Squad Goals	5	11	—	—	—	11. "My Heart Will Go On"; 14. "Can't Stop The Feeling"; Scott Bradlee's Postmodern Jukebox
2017	33 Resolutions Per Minute	—	8	—	—	—	4. "Ice Ice Baby"; 8. "Bye Bye Bye" (Aubrey Logan, Sara Niemietz, Ariana Savalas & Sarah Reich); Scott Bradlee's Postmodern Jukebox
2017	New Gramophone, Who Dis?	—	16	—	—	—	8. "Beauty And The Beast"; Scott Bradlee's Postmodern Jukebox
2017	The New Classics	—	5	8	—	—	4. "Bad Blood"; 10. "Bye, Bye, Bye" (ft. Aubrey Logan, Ariana Savalas & Sara Niemietz); Scott Bradlee's Postmodern Jukebox
2018	Dave Koz Dave Koz And Friends: Summer Horns II From A To Z	—	2	—	1	—	9. "Conga (feat. Aubrey Logan & Gloria Estefan)"; 11. "Route 66"; Dave Koz

=== Charted singles ===
Year	Title	Peak chart positions	Album
Year	Title	Smooth Jazz Airplay	Album
2018	"This Will Be (An Everlasting Love)" (Dave Koz and Friends featuring Kenny Lattimore and Sheléa)	10	Dave Koz and Friends: Summer Horns II – From A to Z
2018	"Keep That Same Old Feeling" (Dave Koz and Friends)	13	Dave Koz and Friends: Summer Horns II – From A to Z
2019	"Before I Let Go" (Dave Koz / Gerald Albright / Rick Braun / Richard Elliot / Aubrey Logan)	1	Dave Koz and Friends: Summer Horns II – From A to Z
