= Morgan James =

American singer, songwriter, and actress (born 1980)

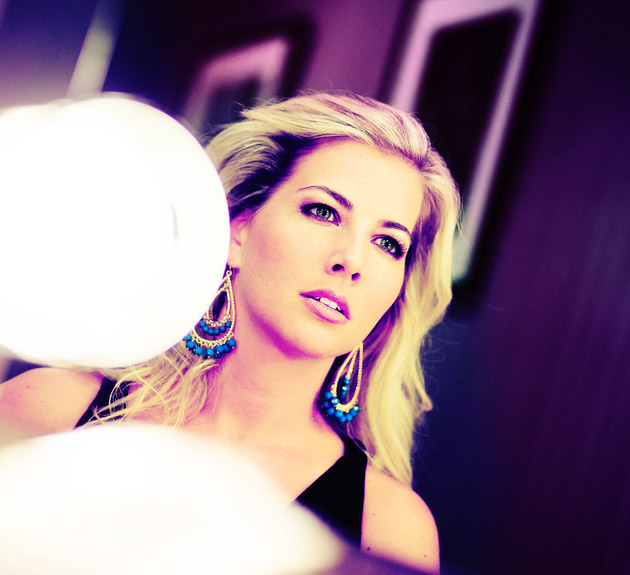
- James in 2014
- Born: Morgan Grunerud; November 24, 1980 (age 45); Boise, Idaho, U.S.
- Occupations: Singer, songwriter, actress
- Years active: 2010–present
- Spouse: Doug Wamble (m. 2016)
- Musical career
- Genres: Soul; R&B; jazz; musical theater
- Labels: Epic, Certified Morganic, Hedonist
- Website: www.morganjamesonline.com

Morgan James (born November 24, 1980) is an American singer, songwriter, and actress. She has appeared in numerous Broadway shows, including Motown: The Musical, Godspell, and The Addams Family.

Her first studio album, Hunter, was released by Epic Records in November 2014. Her second studio album, Reckless Abandon, was released on April 7, 2017.

James is also well known for her numerous musical collaborations with the jazz collective Postmodern Jukebox.

== Early life and education ==
James was born Morgan Grunerud in Boise, Idaho, the daughter of educators and actors Allen Grunerud and Shellie Harwood. The family moved frequently when James was a child, going from Pocatello, Idaho to Utah, Tennessee, and eventually Modesto, California where she spent her high school years. She has a younger brother, Nicholas, who is an avant-garde musician and comedian. James was inspired by her actor parents to enter the performing arts, and she joined a choir while in middle school. Her grandmother bought her a karaoke machine and paid for singing lessons until she went to college.

James attended Peter Johansen High School in Modesto and graduated in 1999. At the age of 17, she realized it was her dream to attend The Juilliard School in New York City, and after auditioning, she was eventually wait-listed and then rejected. However, after significant correspondence with the head of admissions, she persuaded him to accept her as the class's seventh singer, one above the usual six. There, she studied opera, and eventually earned her Bachelor of Music in Voice in 2003. In college, James also took a master class headed by Broadway veteran Barbara Cook.

== Career ==
After college, James initially struggled to find work and looked for jobs that enabled her to use both her operatic and classical training. James did not make her Broadway debut until 2010 in the musical production of The Addams Family, starring Nathan Lane and Bebe Neuwirth. In 2011, James appeared in Frank Wildhorn's Wonderland and the Broadway revival of Godspell. James sprained her ankle in a rehearsal for Godspell in October 2011 and was unable to perform during previews. She recuperated and, by November 2011, was performing in the musical at the Circle in the Square Theatre. In 2013, James took on the role of Teena Marie in Motown: The Musical. She stayed with the cast until December 2013, when she left to pursue a vocal performance tour.

While on Broadway she moonlighted as a solo artist, with a backing band often composed of Chris Fenwick, Matt Fieldes, Damien Bassman, among others. She has played at numerous New York City clubs, including (Le) Poisson Rouge, 54 Below, Rockwood Music Hall, and Birdland. Her first solo album, Morgan James Live: A Celebration of Nina Simone, was recorded at New York jazz club, Dizzy's, and is a collection of Nina Simone cover songs. It was released via Epic Records in December 2012.

Her second solo album (and first studio album), "Hunter", was recorded in 2014 and released via Epic Records in June 2014. The 11-track album was produced by Doug Wamble and is James' first album of all solo material. The album included her cover of Prince's song "Call My Name", which Prince allowed her to put on the record.

On December 16, 2016, James released her second cover album, "Blue", released on the 45th anniversary of Joni Mitchell's album of the same name.

"Reckless Abandon", her second solo studio album, was independently released on April 7, 2017, via her self-created Hedonist Records. It is her first album to feature completely original material and heavily incorporates elements of soul and R&B. On March 31, 2017, she embarked on a national headlining spring "Reckless Abandon Tour" in support of the album.

Since 2014, James collaborates with Postmodern Jukebox, producing several cover songs on their YouTube channel and joining them on tour.

In 2018, Morgan James released "The White Album", her own interpretation of The Beatles' album, on the occasion of its 50th anniversary.

In 2019 James, alongside Broadway legends Cynthia Erivo, Orfeh, Shoshana Bean and Ledisi, recorded an all-female cover of Andrew Andrew Lloyd Webber's “Jesus Christ Superstar". Excerpts were released in 2020 as an EP, “She is Risen”.

Also, in 2020, James traveled to Memphis, TN to record “Memphis Magnetic”. This album was recorded onto Analog Tape using vintage sound equipment at Memphis Magnetic Recording Studio.

2021 James returned to Memphis Magnetic to record her first Christmas Album “A Very Magnetic Christmas”. This Album was recorded Live to analog Tape in front of a small audience. Her live performances, along with interviews, were also Video Taped and released just prior to Christmas 2023 as “Morgan James – The Christmas Special” on YouTube.

In 2022 James was finally given the green light by Andrew Lloyd Webber to release her “Jesus Christ Superstar – Highlights from the All-Female Studio Cast Recording”.

2023 featured James releasing her sixth Studio Album “Nobody’s Fool” where she returns to her Rhythm & Blues roots.

2024 saw James recorded her second Live Album “Live at Antone’s” at the iconic Blues venue Antone’s Nightclub in Austin, TX.

In 2025 James released her seventh Studio Album “Soul Remains The Same” (a Nod to Led Zeppelin”). On this Album James departs from her original music and reimagines classic Rock and Metal Songs from the 80s & 90s, transforming them through the lens of Soul and R&B. In keeping with this James also collaborated with Brass Against on their cover of Ozzy Osbourne’s “No More Tears” and of Smashing Pumpkins’s “Bullet With Butterfly Wings”

== Personal life ==
James lives in Harlem with her husband, guitarist and producer Doug Wamble, whom she married in spring of 2016.

== Discography ==
=== Albums ===
==== Studio albums ====
Title	Album details
Hunter	Released: November 4, 2014 (US); Label: Epic
Reckless Abandon	Released: April 7, 2017 (US); Label: Hedonist
Memphis Magnetic	Released: February 7, 2020; Label: Hedonist
Quarantunes, Vol. 1	Released: September 4, 2020; Label: Hedonist
Quarantunes, Vol. 2	Released: October 9, 2020; Label: Hedonist
A Very Magnetic Christmas	Released: November 5, 2021; Label: Hedonist
Nobody's Fool	Released: March 31, 2023; Label: Hedonist

==== Cover albums ====
Title	Album details
Morgan James Live: A Celebration of Nina Simone	Released: December 4, 2012 (US); Label: Epic
Blue	Released: December 16, 2016 (US); Label: Certified Morganic
The White Album	Released: October 26, 2018 (US); Label: Hedonist

==== Live albums ====
Title	Album details
Morgan James Live	Released: December 4, 2012; Label: Epic
Morgan James "Live at Antone's"	Released: August 23, 2024; Label: Hedonist

=== Extended plays ===
Title	Album details
YouTube Sessions	Released: November 13, 2015; Label: Certified Morganic
OurVinyl Sessions	Released: September 29, 2017; Label: OurVinyl
Blue December	Released: December 4, 2020; Label: Hedonist
Memphis Magnetic: Stripped	Released: February 12, 2021; Label: Hedonist
Memphis Magnetic: Covers	Released: May 7, 2021; Label: Hedonist

=== Singles ===
Year	Single	Album
2014	"I Want You"	Hunter
2014	"Call My Name"	Hunter
2015	"Last December"	Non-album single
2015	"What Christmas Means to Me"	Non-album single
2017	"This Christmas"	Non-album single
2017	"Please Come Home for Christmas"	Non-album single
2018	"Have Yourself a Merry Little Christmas"	Non-album single
2019	"I Don't Mind Waking Up (To a Love This Good)"	Memphis Magnetic
2020	"Give You Up"	Memphis Magnetic
2020	"My Sweet December"	Non-album single
2021	"Lonely Christmas"	Non-album single
2023	"Everybody Here Wants You"	Nobody's Fool
2023	"Nobody's Fool But Mine"	Nobody's Fool
