= Sarah Reich =

American tap dancer and choreographer

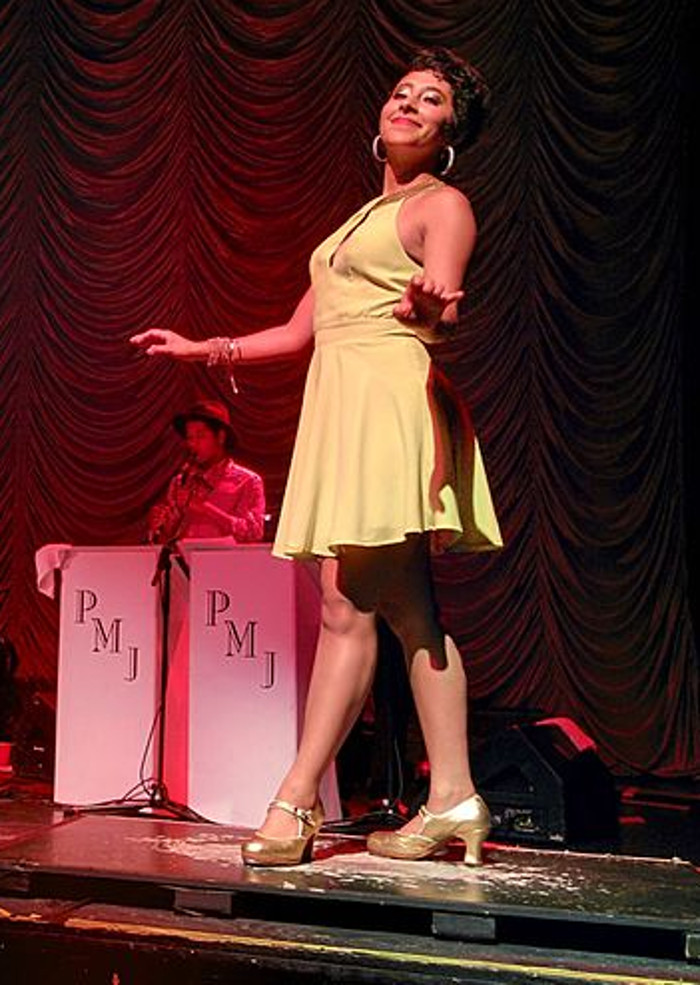
- Sarah Reich performing with Postmodern Jukebox.
- Born: May 24, 1989 (age 37); Culver City, California, U.S.
- Occupations: Performer, choreographer, instructor
- Website: www.sarahreich.com

Sarah Reich (born May 24, 1989) is a tap dance instructor, choreographer and performer. She is best known as a featured artist for Postmodern Jukebox, touring the U.S. and Europe in 2015 and 2016. In addition to performing tap-percussion solos with numerous featured vocalists, her rendition of a Star Wars medley was featured in Slate and People magazines. She appears alongside vocalist Sara Niemietz in London, for an MTV, Postmodern Jukebox feature shoot, covering "Ex's & Oh's" in 2016.

Featured in Dance Spirit Magazine's “20 Hot Tappers Under 20” in 2009, Reich is widely recognized in professional dance circles. She has performed on American reality television show So You Think You Can Dance as a member of Chloe Arnold's Syncopated Ladies, who won the eleventh season's dance crew battle, and also previously appeared as a guest performer in the eighth season with Jason Samuels Smith's tap company Anybody Can Get It (ACGI). In 2015, The New York Times, Gia Kourlas, praised Reich's presentation at Tony Waag's "Tap Forward" at the Tap City festival.

== Early life ==
Sarah Reich was born in Culver City, California. Her mother is Mexican and her father is Hungarian. She started at age five to dance tap. When she was 12 years old she danced salsa in clubs with her sister. Then she mixed tap steps with popular salsa and merengue steps.
