= Robyn Adele Anderson =

American singer (born 1989)

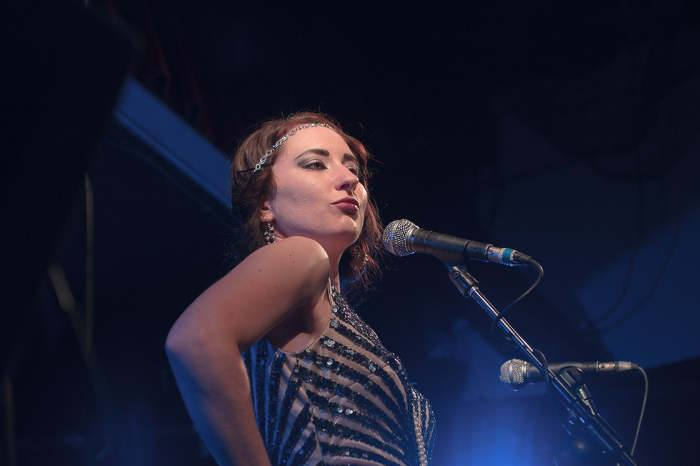
- Anderson performing on stage with Postmodern Jukebox

Background information
- Born: February 19, 1989 (age 37); Albany, New York, U.S.
- Genres: Jazz, pop
- Occupations: Singer, actress
- Years active: 2011–present
- Website: robynadele.com

Robyn Adele Anderson (born February 19, 1989) is an American singer and stage actress based in New York City. She is a cast member and featured artist for Scott Bradlee's Postmodern Jukebox with over 250 million YouTube views on her music videos. She is credited with the band's breakthrough covers of "Thrift Shop" and "We Can't Stop" in 2013. Anderson also performed lead vocals for performances on Good Morning America (ABC) in 2013, and TEDx in 2014.

== Early life and education ==
Robyn Adele Anderson was born in Albany, New York. She grew up in Glenmont, New York with her mother, father, and half-sister. She is of German, Dutch, English, Scottish, and Native American descent. She attended Bethlehem Central High School where she played clarinet in the Wind Ensemble and sang in several choral groups.

She graduated from Binghamton University in 2011 with a Bachelors of Arts degree in Political Science and Arabic and concentrations in Middle Eastern Studies and International Affairs. She studied at the University of Seville in Spain for a semester in 2009 and became a study-abroad peer adviser. Her academic accomplishments won her the Israel J. Rosefksy Language and Culture Scholarship and the Chancellor's Award for Student Excellence in 2011. She was also selected as the intern for Binghamton's Planet Library project, an internationalization effort.

== Career ==
From 2012 to 2015, Anderson worked for the ANSOB Center for Refugees, a non-profit organization in Astoria, Queens that assists refugees in obtaining legal and social services.

In February 2013, Anderson began collaborating with American pianist and musical arranger Scott Bradlee, becoming a founding member of Bradlee's Postmodern Jukebox collective. In 2013, Anderson's vocal contributions to the Postmodern Jukebox cover of Macklemore & Ryan Lewis' "Thrift Shop" (2012) helped the video receive one million views on YouTube in its first week and four million in its first year.

After serving as Postmodern Jukebox' primary vocalist, Anderson started producing music under her own name. The music was released on YouTube and other platforms. As of August 2021, her YouTube channel has over 653,000 subscribers and over 84 million views.

In January 2014, she became a staff writer for the online K-pop magazine KpopStarz.

In 2015, she was cast as Lilyan Tashman in Cynthia von Buhler's Speakeasy Dollhouse: Ziegfeld's Midnight Frolic at the Liberty Theatre.

In 2016, she played the part of Lucile in FlexCo.'s production of The Flying Doctor at the Central Booking Art Space on the Lower East Side. Occasionally she is a guest vocalist for the musical duo The Skivvies, composed of Lauren Molina and Nick Cearley.

In 2017, Anderson began a series of solo shows, first at Feinstein's/54 Below followed by several at Sleep No More's Manderley Bar, and a two-week tour in 2018 alongside Von Smith.

Anderson voiced the character Robin Koninsky (a Polish singer) in the 2018 video game Red Dead Redemption 2. Other members of Postmodern Jukebox also made appearances. In the same year, Robyn Adele (Vol 1.) was released on Bandcamp.

== Discography ==
=== Solo ===
- Vol. 1 (2018)
- Vol. 2 (2019)
- Vol. 3 (2019)
- Vol. 4 (2019)
- Platinium Collection - EP (2019, Vinyl)
- Vol. 5 (2020)
- OMG I Love Jazz (2020)
- Vol. 6 (2021)
- A Very Vintage Christmas - EP (CD)

=== As member of Postmodern Jukebox ===
- Introducing Postmodern Jukebox (2013)
- Twist is the New Twerk (2014)
- Clubbin' with Grandpa (2014)
- Selfies on Kodachrome (2015)
- 33 Resolutions Per Minute (2017)

=== Postmodern Jukebox videography ===
As of December 12, 2016, music videos featuring Anderson account for over 200 million of Postmodern Jukebox' 1 billion+ total YouTube viewcount.

Postmodern Jukebox music videos featuring Robyn Adele Anderson
Video title	Date published	YouTube viewcount	Notes
"We Can't Stop - 1950's Doo Wop Miley Cyrus Cover ft. Robyn Adele Anderson, The Tee - Tones"	Sep 3, 2013	25,529,708	feat. the Tee-Tones
"Thrift Shop (Vintage "Grandpa Style" Macklemore Cover)"	Feb 11, 2013	16,782,491	
"Burn - Vintage '60s Girl Group Ellie Goulding Cover with Flame-O-Phone"	Apr 8, 2014	23,450,327	
"Timber - Vintage 1950's Doo Wop Pitbull / Ke$ha Cover"	Feb 3, 2014	12,464,167	feat. the Tee-Tones
"Careless Whisper - Vintage 1930's Jazz Wham! Cover ft. Dave Koz"	Feb 25, 2014	25,448,114	
"Blurred Lines - Vintage "Bluegrass Barn Dance" Robin Thicke Cover"	Oct 22, 2013	12,973,374	
"Call Me Maybe - Vintage Carly Rae Jepsen Cover [The Original Video]"	Jul 30, 2013	14,136,248	
"Anaconda - Vintage Bluegrass Hoedown - Style Nicki Minaj Cover"	Sep 30, 2014	8,148,473	
"Talk Dirty - Vintage Klezmer Jason Derulo Cover (with 2 Chainz Rap in Yiddish)"	Mar 25, 2014	9,992,778	
"Gangsta's Paradise - Vintage 1920's Al Capone Style Coolio Cover ft. Robyn Adele Anderson"	Mar 10, 2015	14,937,604	
"Say Something - Jazz / Soul A Great Big World Cover ft. Hudson Thames"	Apr 2, 2014	12,566,607	feat. Hudson Thames
"Wake Me Up - Mariachi Style Avicii / Aloe Blacc Cover en Español"	Dec 4, 2013	8,038,439	
"Gentleman (Vintage 1920s Gatsby - Style Psy Cover)"	May 21, 2013	6,716,868	
"Don't You Worry Child (Vintage 'Great Gatsby' Style Swedish House Mafia Cover)"	Apr 24, 2013	7,530,255	
"Wiggle - Vintage 1920s Broadway Jason Derulo / Snoop Dogg Cover"	Jul 22, 2014	6,902,173	
"Just (Tap) Dance - Vintage 1940's Jazz Lady Gaga Cover"	Nov 19, 2013	4,728,331	
"Beauty and a Beat (Vintage 1940's Swing Justin Bieber / Nicki Minaj Cover)"	May 1, 2013	5,903,187	
"Die Young - "Kesha Gone Country" Wild West Ke$ha Cover"	Feb 27, 2013	4,621,502	
"Problem - Vintage '50s Doo-Wop Ariana Grande Cover ft. The Tee - Tones"	Sep 9, 2014	4,620,317	feat. the Tee-Tones
"Come and Get It - Vintage 1940s Jazz Selena Gomez Cover"	Aug 5, 2013	5,160,673	
"Girls Just Wanna Have Fun - Vintage 1912 Bioshock Infinite - Style Waltz Cover"	Aug 19, 2014	5,025,852	
"Like a Prayer - Vintage 1940's Swing Madonna Cover"	May 13, 2014	4,904,550	
"I Kissed A Girl - Vintage '50s Doo Wop Katy Perry Cover ft. Robyn Adele Anderson"	Jul 16, 2015	10,861,023	
"We Found Love - Vintage Jazz Rihanna / Calvin Harris Cover"	Apr 15, 2014	2,732,258	
"Birthday - Vintage Doo Wop / Soul Katy Perry Cover ft. The Tee - Tones"	Jun 3, 2014	1,954,662	feat. the Tee-Tones
"Summer - Vintage Latin Style Calvin Harris Cover"	Oct 21, 2014	1,841,675	
"Paper Planes - Vintage 1940's Style MIA Cover ft. Robyn Adele Anderson"	Apr 16, 2015	1,914,888	
"Young and Beautiful - Vintage 1920's Lana Del Rey / Great Gatsby Cover ft. Robyn Adele Anderson"	Jan 7, 2014	6,061,544	
"Hollaback Girl - Vintage Swing Gwen Stefani Cover ft. Robyn Adele Anderson"	Apr 14, 2016	1,458,854	
"Cold Water - Vintage Bluegrass / Folk / Old Time Major Lazer Cover ft. Robyn Adele Anderson"	September 15, 2016	1,178,369	
Total view count:	February 3, 2017	over 181 million views	
Totals do not include music videos where Anderson performed in a backup vocalist capacity

She also appears performing backup vocals on at least one video with Postmodern Jukebox:

"Rude - Vintage 1950s Sock Hop - Style MAGIC! Cover ft. Von Smith" published July 15, 2014

- TEDx Talks: "A bizarro world of pop music | Postmodern Jukebox | TEDxFoggyBottom"
- Good Morning America (ABC)
