= Booty Pop =

Padded underwear brand

Booty Pop (Sweet Apparel LLC), is a private US company that mainly manufacturers padded underwear for women intended to give the wearer an appearance of curvy, lifted buttocks.

The company, based in Boston, was founded in 2008 by Susan Bloomstone and Lisa Reisler. It was the subject of a The Wall Street Journal article about the market for undergarments of this nature.
