= Regency Center =

Event venue in San Francisco, California

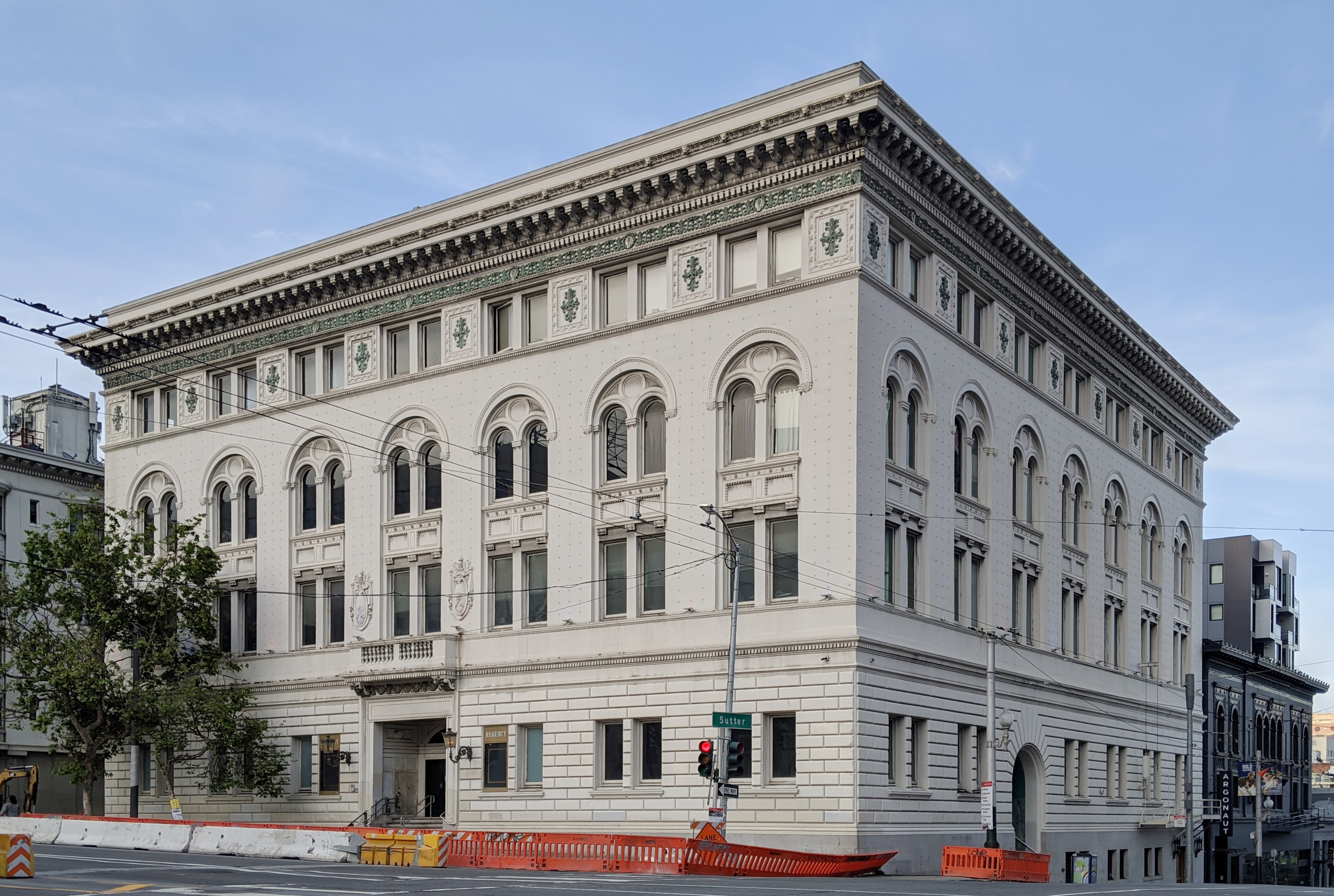
- The Regency Center in 2020
- Interactive map of Regency Center
- Full name: Scottish Rites Bodies Regency Center
- Former names: Scottish Rite Temple (1909–67); Regency I (1967–98); Regency Center (2002–15)
- Address: 1270 Sutter St; San Francisco, California 94109-5517
- Location: Van Ness/Polk Gulch
- Coordinates: 37°47′16.5″N 122°25′17.4″W
- Owner: Scott L Robertson
- Operator: AEG
- Capacity: 1,423 (Regency Ballroom); 600 (Social Hall); 300 (Lodge); 300 (Social Hall Annex)

Construction
- Opened: 1909
- Closed: 1999–2002
- Architect: Albert Roller

Website
- Venue Website

The Scottish Rites Bodies Regency Center (commonly known as the Regency Center) is a multi-use events venue located in San Francisco. at the intersection of Van Ness Avenue and Sutter Street. It opened in 1909 as a masonic lodge. In later years, it has served as a dance studio and movie theatre.

== History ==
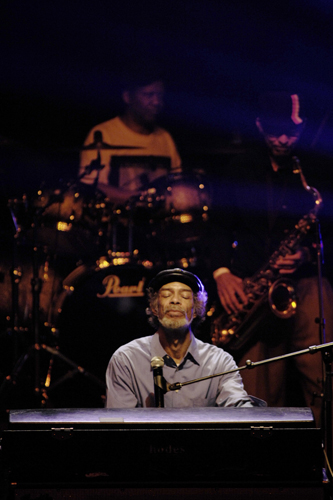
Gil Scott-Heron performing in 2009

The venue opened in 1909 as the "Scottish Rite Temple", built by the Scottish Rite as a masonic lodge. In 1966, the lodge was purchased by Blumenfeld Enterprises and converted into an 800-seat movie theater. The theater opened as "Regency I" on December 22, 1967, with a showing of The Birds, the Bees and the Italians. The neighboring building, known as "Regency II" was formerly the Avalon Ballroom. Blumenfeld Enterprises converted this space into an adjoining movie theatre in 1968 and remained opened until 2001. In 1980, the building was also used by the Polish Arts and Culture Foundation as a banquet hall and dance studio until 1999 (known as the "Ruvano Dance Studio").

The theatre closed on November 7, 1998, and the dance studio remained in the building until January 1999. The venue remained dormant until it was purchased by Scott Robertson in 2000. Renovations for the space began February 2001, with a grand reopening as the "Regency Center" in March 2002. During this time, the venue was primarily used for corporate events, trade shows and weddings, with 9-15 concerts held annually. In 2008, the Warfield Theatre closed for renovations, with all concerts moved to the Grand Ballroom. The move increased the venue's use as a concert hall. Concert promoter Goldenvoice began management and operations of the venue in September 2008. In 2015, the venue was renamed the "Scottish Rites Bodies Regency Center" to tie in its heritage as a former masonic lodge.

== Venues ==
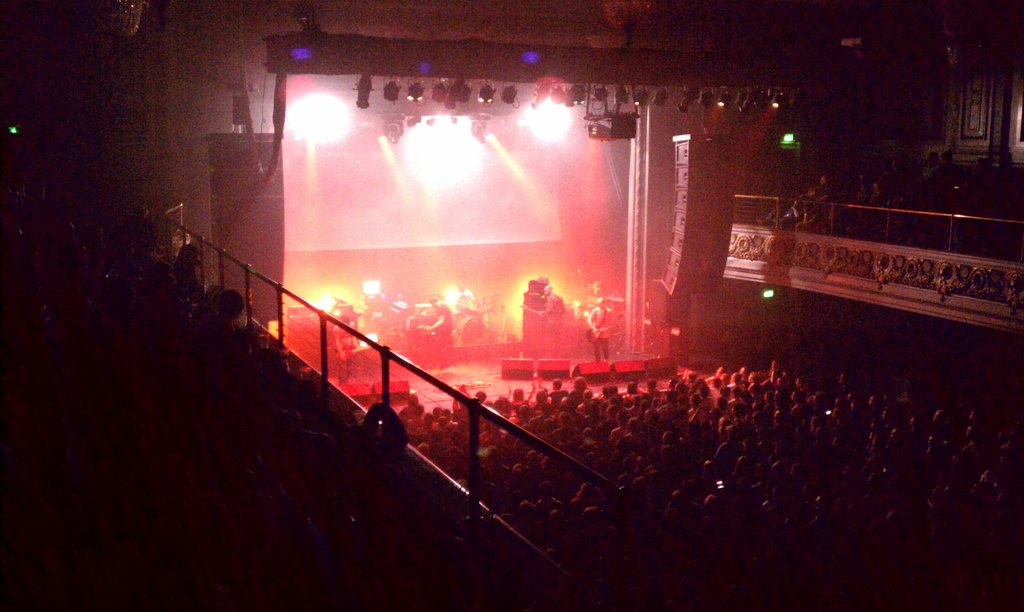
Mogwai performing at The Regency Ballroom in 2011

- Regency Ballroom: The Beaux-Arts designed auditorium serves as the main concert venue and ballroom. It can hold 700 guests in a theatre setting and up to 1,400 in a reception/general admission setting. This venue was formerly known as the "Grand Ballroom at Regency Center" from 2002 until 2008.
- The Lodge: The original meeting hall for the Scottish Rite Freemasons. It features the original Austin Organs from 1909. The venue can hold up to 300 guests. It is used for fundraising events, galas and seminars.
- Social Hall: This basement venue is primarily used for comedy events, private functions and receptions. The hall was originally known as the "Sutter Room" from 2002 until 2014. The venue closed for a year and renovations and reopened in Fall 2015. The changes allowed the hall to be used as a general admission music venue, holding up to 600 guests

== See also ==
- Avalon Ballroom
- The Fillmore
- Winterland
