= Kardashian family =

American family prominent in entertainment, business, and fashion

- Logo of their current television series The Kardashians
- Current region: Los Angeles, California, U.S.
- Origin: Armenia · United States
- Members: Robert Kardashian; Kris Jenner; Kourtney Kardashian; Kim Kardashian; Khloé Kardashian; Rob Kardashian; Kendall Jenner; Kylie Jenner; Offspring: North West
- Connected members: Caitlyn Jenner; Burt Jenner; Linda Thompson; Brandon Jenner; Brody Jenner; Scott Disick; Travis Barker; Kanye West; Tristan Thompson; Blac Chyna; Travis Scott; Kris Humphries; Lamar Odom

The Kardashian family (/kɑːrˈdæʃiən/ kar-DASH-ee-ən), also referred to as the Kardashian–Jenner family, is an American family prominent in the fields of entertainment, reality television, fashion design, and business. Through different ventures, several members of the family have assets of over $1 billion.

The patriarch of the family was American attorney Robert Kardashian (1944–2003), who gained notoriety for being one of O. J. Simpson's lawyers during the O. J. Simpson murder case in 1994. The family reached greater recognition in 2007, after Kardashian's middle daughter, Kim Kardashian, was involved in the pornographic film Kim Kardashian, Superstar, which featured her then-boyfriend Ray J, catapulting the family into the world of reality television and business. From 2007 to 2021, the Kardashian–Jenner family appeared together on the highly popular, albeit controversial, reality television show Keeping Up with the Kardashians. The show's 14-year run gave and maintained media exposure to each member of the family, allowing them to start and build their individual careers in multiple businesses under their separate brands.

Kardashian and first wife Kris Jenner (née Houghton) had four children: Kourtney (b. 1979), Kim (b. 1980), Khloé (b. 1984), and Rob Kardashian (b. 1987). After Robert and Kris divorced in 1991, she remarried to Olympic decathlon champion Bruce Jenner (known since 2015 as Caitlyn Jenner). They had two daughters: Kendall and Kylie Jenner. Robert died of esophageal cancer in 2003. Notable extended relatives include Brandon and Brody Jenner, the half-siblings of Kendall and Kylie (through Bruce/Caitlyn's marriage to Linda Thompson); Scott Disick, the longtime boyfriend of Kourtney Kardashian, with whom she shares three children; Travis Barker, Blink-182 drummer and husband of Kourtney, whom she shares one child with; rapper Kanye West, former husband to Kim Kardashian and father to their four children together; Canadian basketball player Tristan Thompson, former boyfriend of Khloé and father to their two children; model Blac Chyna, former girlfriend of Rob and mother to their one child; rapper and singer Travis Scott, former boyfriend of Kylie and father to their two children.

They have since been referred to as "America's most famous family" by Glamour, "one of the most influential family 'dynasties' in the world" by Insider, and the biggest influencers of the 2010s by Vogue. They are the focus of the book Kardashian Dynasty: The Controversial Rise of America's Royal Family by Ian Halperin.

The family is best known for their longest-running reality television show, Keeping Up with the Kardashians (2007–2021). Spin-offs included: Kourtney and Kim Take Miami (2009–2013); Kourtney and Khloé Take Miami (2009–2013); Kourtney and Kim Take New York (2011–2012); Khloé & Lamar (2013); Kourtney and Kim Take Miami (2014–2015); Kourtney and Khloé Take The Hamptons (2014–2015); Dash Dolls (2015) and Life of Kylie (2017). In 2022, the family debuted their new reality television series The Kardashians.

== Family background ==
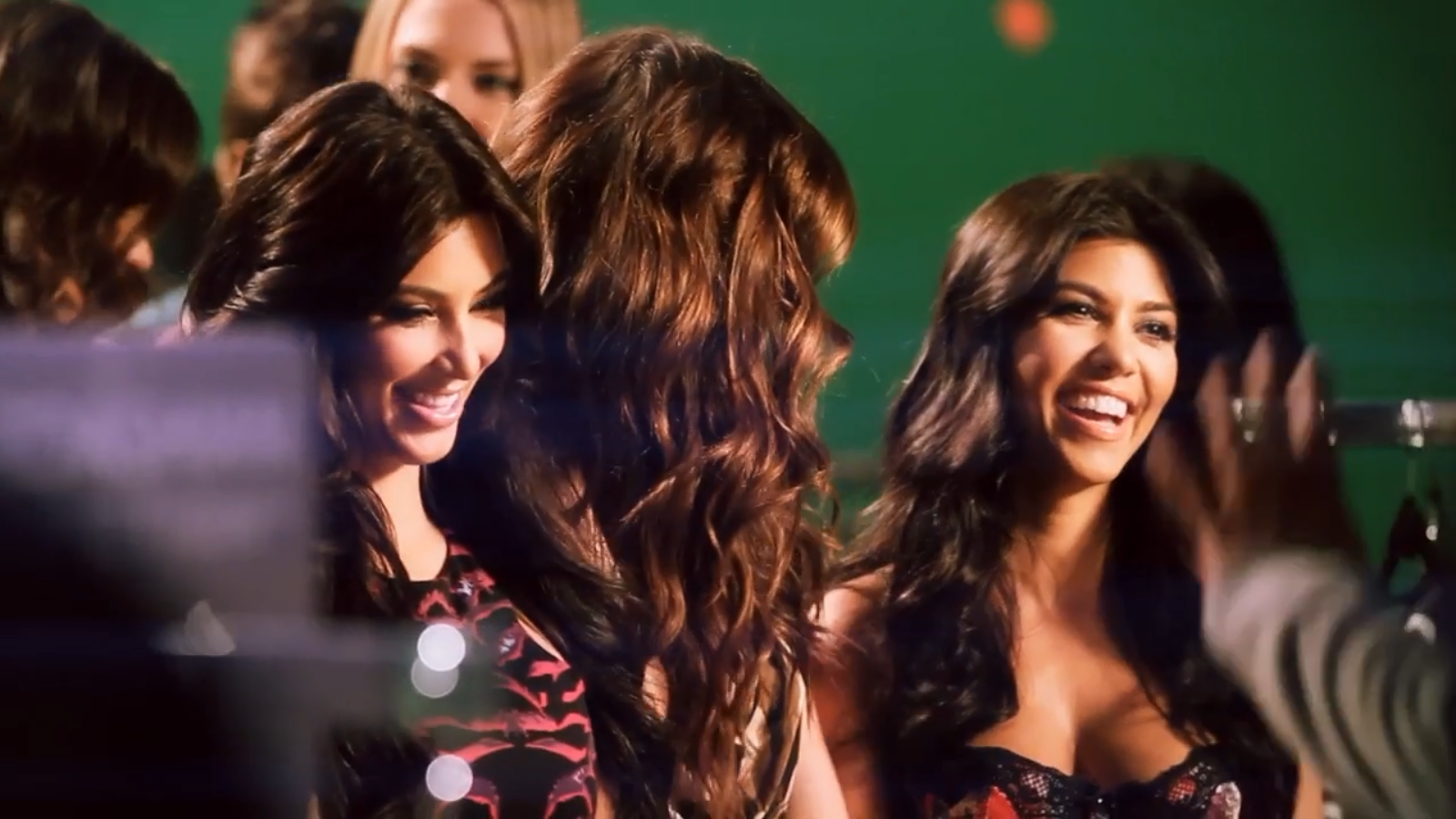
Kardashians

Robert Kardashian Sr. was the son of Helen and Arthur Kardashian. All four of his grandparents were Armenian who emigrated from the Ottoman Empire to the United States of America in the early 20th century, originating from the provinces of Kars and Ardahan in modern-day Turkey. The family left the Ottoman Empire before the Armenian genocide began in 1915.

== History ==
In 1978, American attorney Robert Kardashian (1944–2003) married Kristen "Kris" Houghton (now Kris Jenner). During their 13-year marriage, they had four children: Kourtney Mary Kardashian (b. 1979), Kimberly Noel Kardashian (b. 1980), Khloé Alexandra Kardashian (b. 1984), and Robert Arthur Kardashian (b. 1987). Robert Kardashian's roots are of Armenian descent, while Kris is of Dutch, English, Irish, German and Scottish descent. Kardashian filed for divorce from Kris in 1990, after discovering infidelities on her behalf; the divorce was finalized in 1991.

Kardashian met then-rising football player O. J. Simpson at a tennis court around 1969. Kris was introduced to Simpson's then-girlfriend Nicole Brown through Kardashian when she was 17. Soon after, the couples developed a very close friendship, with Kris describing them as family. After Brown was murdered in 1994, Simpson was charged with of her murder, as well as her friend Ron Goldman. Kardashian joined Simpson's legal team in the highly publicized murder trial the same year, for which he gained subsequent notoriety.

In the month following the Kardashian's divorce finalization, Kris married her second husband, former Olympian Bruce Jenner. Soon after the murder trial concluded in January 1995, the Jenners became pregnant with their first child, Kendall Nicole Jenner (b. 1995), whose middle name is a tribute to Brown. Jenner gave birth to her sixth and youngest child, Kylie Kristen Jenner in 1997.

In 2006, Kris Jenner developed a concept for a reality series revolving around her family; the idea was catapulted following the release of her daughter Kim's sex tape, Kim Kardashian, Superstar, in March 2007 by Vivid Entertainment. With the backing of Ryan Seacrest and his production company, Keeping Up with the Kardashians was created, premiering on the E! Network in October of 2007. The series ran from 2007 to 2020 during its 20-season-tenure, becoming one of E!'s most successful reality shows, along with its many spin-offs.

== Business ==
=== Fashion ===
In 2003, Kris Jenner and her eldest daughter Kourtney opened the children's clothing boutique Smooch, which operated for six years before closing in 2009. In 2006, sisters Kourtney, Kim, and Khloé Kardashian opened their high-end women's clothing boutique DASH in Calabasas, California. The three sisters would extend the chain to Miami Beach in 2009, New York City in 2010, and West Hollywood in 2012. The chain ceased its operations in 2018. The sisters would continue their fashion expansion with their K-DASH by Kardashian line for QVC, which launched in September 2010.

In 2011, the Kardashian sisters signed a deal with department store Sears to launch the Kardashian Kollection, a clothing, handbag, and accessory collection. The sisters partnered with Australian designer Bruno Schiavi's Jupi International to create the collection. Announced in August, the collection launched in September in 700 Sears locations as Executive Vice President of Apparel and Home Accessories John Goodman described the project as vital to reinventing Sears' apparel and image. The line later extended to Kardashian Kollection Home, which sold bedding and home decor, and expand internationally in 2012, partnering with Arcadia Group chairman Sir Philip Green for the collection to be sold in over 250 locations of the British women's clothing retailer Dorothy Perkins, as well as 11 other countries in the Middle East and Asia. With a quickly sold out collaboration with Lipsy in 2013, the collection reached substantial success before being discontinued in May 2015.

=== Body and beauty ===
In 2010, the Kardashian sisters launched the Kardashian Beauty line, with their first product being their tanning gel, Kardashian Glamour Tan, which was sold exclusively at Sephora. Subsequently, PerfectSkin, the sisters' skincare product, was introduced to the line. In June 2012, the Kardashian sisters announced the launch of their makeup collection, Khroma Beauty, which was later rebranded to Kardashian Beauty after a lengthy legal battle with a company of a similar name.

=== Finance ===
Briefly in November 2010, the Kardashian sisters partnered with credit card company Mastercard to produce the Kardashian Kard, a pre-paid credit card. The partnership dissolved after three weeks due to high fees for ATM withdrawals and cancellations, which could reach $100 a year.

=== Authorship ===
Collectively, Kourtney, Kim, and Khloé Kardashian have published two books, their first being the shared autobiography Kardashian Konfidential (2010), which, at its peak, reached No. 3 on The New York Times Best Sellers list in the "Advice, How-To, and Miscellaneous" category, and remained on the list for five weeks from December 2010 to January 2011. In May 2011, Kim announced to her Celebuzz blog that the sisters were writing their first fiction book with William Morrow and Company, as the sisters enlisted the help of their fans with naming the book. Dollhouse (2011) was released on November 15.

In 2014, Kendall and Kylie Jenner jointly published their dystopian fiction novel, Rebels: City of Indra: The Story of Lex and Livia. The book received criticism due to the Jenner sisters' use of ghostwriter Maya Sloan. As Rebels ended on a cliffhanger, the Jenner sisters published the series' second installment, Time of the Twins, in 2016.

== Reception ==
The family and media give Kim the credit for helping them start their careers. The family has been criticized as being famous for being famous. Ben Hecht, writing in 1954, pointed out that "People in our day become famous who are no more than advertisements, and they advertise not genius but existence. They are famous for stopping at hotels, for holding hands in public, for speaking to each other, for having babies, for getting invited to parties ... We are less interested in their talents than in their publicized routines." In late May 2020, Forbes released an investigation into Kylie's finances, alleging she misrepresented her billionaire status. Writers Chase Peterson-Withorn and Madeline Berg stated, "... white lies, omissions and outright fabrications are to be expected from the family that perfected—then monetized—the concept of 'famous for being famous.'" Vogue stated the Kardashians have "... proved that although they were 'famous for being famous' in the 2000s, in the 2010s they became a cultural force to be reckoned with." They were given keys to Beverly Hills on September 2, 2010, the date (written as 9/02/10) intentionally selected to match the area's ZIP Code of 90210. The family are often criticized for blackfishing and cultural appropriation of African-American culture.

=== Parodies ===
The Kardashians have inspired a number of parodies, including on the television sketch comedy Saturday Night Live, on which Kim Kardashian has appeared multiple times. The YouTube animated parody channel Simgm Productions has also gained popularity for their parodies of numerous celebrities and media franchises, including the Kardashian's, through the use of animation and characters in the Sims. Other popular adult animated series, such as Family Guy, The Simpsons and South Park have also depicted and parodied the Kardashians.

== Members of the Kardashian-Jenner Family ==
Notable members of the Kardashian Family include:

- Kris Jenner
- Robert Kardashian
- Kim Kardashian
- Khloe Kardashian
- Kourtney Kardashian
- Rob Kardashian
- Caitlyn Jenner
- Kendall Jenner
- Kylie Jenner

People who are relevant to the Kardashian-Jenner family are:

Relevant to Caitlyn Jenner

- Chrystie Scott (previously married to Caitlyn Jenner, 1972–1981)
  - Burt Jenner (son of Caitlyn Jenner and Chrystie Scott)
  - Cassandra Marino (daughter of Caitlyn Jenner and Chrystie Scott)
- Linda Thompson (previously married to Caitlyn Jenner, 1981–1986)
  - Brandon Jenner (son of Caitlyn Jenner and Linda Thompson)
  - Brody Jenner (son of Caitlyn Jenner and Linda Thompson)

Relevant to Kim Kardashian

- Damon Thomas (previously married to Kim Kardashian, 2000–2004)
- Ray J (previously in a relationship with Kim Kardashian and filmed their sex tape)
- Kris Humphries (previously married to Kim Kardashian, 2011–2013)
- Kanye West (previously married to Kim Kardashian, 2014–2022)
  - North West (daughter of Kim Kardashian and Kanye West)
  - Saint West (son of Kim Kardashian and Kanye West)
  - Chicago West (daughter of Kim Kardashian and Kanye West)
  - Psalm West (son of Kim Kardashian and Kanye West)
- Pete Davidson (previously in a relationship with Kim Kardashian, 2021–2022)
- Lewis Hamilton (in a relationship with Kim Kardashian since 2026)

Relevant to Kourtney Kardashian

- Scott Disick (previously in a relationship with Kourtney Kardashian, 2006–2015)
  - Mason Disick (son of Kourtney Kardashian and Scott Disick)
  - Penelope Disick (daughter of Kourtney Kardashian and Scott Disick)
  - Reign Disick (son of Kourtney Kardashian and Scott Disick)
- Travis Barker (married to Kourtney Kardashian since 2022)
  - Landon Barker (Kourtney Kardashian's step-son)
  - Alabama Barker (Kourtney Kardashian's step-daughter)
  - Rocky Barker (son of Kourtney Kardashian and Travis Barker)

Relevant to Khloé Kardashian

- Lamar Odom (previously married to Khloé Kardashian, 2009–2016)
- Tristan Thompson (previously in a relationship with Khloé Kardashian, 2016–2021)
  - True Thompson (daughter of Khloé Kardashian and Tristan Thompson)
  - Tatum Thompson (son of Khloé Kardashian and Tristan Thompson)

Relevant to Kylie Jenner

- Cody Simpson (previously in a relationship with Kylie Jenner, 2011)
- Tyga (previously in a relationship with Kylie Jenner, 2015–2017)
- Travis Scott (previously in a relationship with Kylie Jenner, 2017–2023)
  - Stormi Webster (daughter of Kylie Jenner and Travis Scott)
  - Aire Webster (son of Kylie Jenner and Travis Scott)
- Timothée Chalamet (in a relationship with Kylie Jenner since 2023)

Relevant to Rob Kardashian

- Blac Chyna (previously engaged to Rob Kardashian)
  - Dream Kardashian (daughter of Rob Kardashian and Blac Chyna)

== Family tree ==
Kardashian–Jenner family tree

Robert Kardashian	Kris Houghton	Caitlyn Jenner
Kourtney Kardashian	Travis Barker	Kim Kardashian	Kanye West	Khloé Kardashian	Tristan Thompson	Rob Kardashian	Blac Chyna	Kendall Jenner	Kylie Jenner
North West

=== Kardashian family tree ===
- Tatos Saghatel Kardashian†, married Hamas Shakarian†
  - Arthur Kardashian†, married Helen Arakelian†
    - Barbara Kardashian Freeman† (1939–2022)
    - Thomas "Tom" Kardashian (born 1940), m. Joan "Joanie" Roberts
    - Robert Kardashian† (1944–2003), formerly married to Kris Houghton (born 1955; 1978–1991)
      - Kourtney Mary Kardashian (born 1979), dated Scott Disick (2006–2015); married Travis Barker 2022
        - Mason Dash Disick (born 2009)
        - Penelope Scotland Disick (born 2012)
        - Reign Aston Disick (born 2014)
        - Rocky Thirteen Barker (born 2023)
      - Kimberly "Kim" Noel Kardashian (born 1980), formerly married to Kanye West (2014–2022)
        - North West (born 2013)
        - Saint West (born 2015)
        - Chicago Noel West (born 2018)
        - Psalm Ye West (born 2019)
      - Khloé Alexandra Kardashian (born 1984), formerly married to Lamar Odom (2009–2016), dated Tristan Thompson (2016–2021)
        - True Thompson (born 2018)
        - Tatum Thompson (born 2022)
      - Robert "Rob" Arthur Kardashian (born 1987), dated Angela Renée "Blac Chyna" White (2016–2017)
        - Dream Renée Kardashian (born 2016)

=== Kardashian–Jenner family tree ===
- William Hugh Jenner† m. Esther Ruth McGuire
  - Bruce Jenner, known since 2015 as Caitlyn Jenner (b. October 28, 1949), formerly married to Chrystie Crownover (m. 1972, div. 1981), Linda Thompson (m. 1981, div. 1986) and Kris Kardashian (b. November 5, 1955, m. 1991, div. 2015)
    - Burt William Jenner (b. September 6, 1978, partnered with Valerie Pitalo)
      - Bodhi Burton Jenner (b. August 4, 2016)
      - William Behr Jenner (b. February 9, 2019)
      - Goldie Brooklyn Jenner (b. March 19, 2022)
    - Cassandra "Casey" Lynn Jenner (b. June 10, 1980, married to Mark Marino)
      - Francesca Marino (b. 2009)
      - Isabella Marino (b. 2012)
      - Luke Marino (b. October 18, 2016)
    - Brandon Jenner (b. June 4, 1981), formerly married to Leah Felder (m. 2012, div. 2019), married to Cayley Stoker (m. 2020)
      - Eva James Jenner (b. July 22, 2015)
      - Bo Thompson Jenner (b. February 19, 2020)
      - Sam Stoker Jenner (b. February 19, 2020)
      - Joan Almond Jenner (b. August 26, 2024)
    - Brody Jenner (b. August 21, 1983), married to Tia Blanco (m. 2025)
      - Honey Raye Jenner (b. July 29, 2023)
    - Kendall Jenner (b. November 3, 1995)
    - Kylie Jenner (b. August 10, 1997)
      - Stormi Webster (b. February 1, 2018)
      - Aire Webster (b. February 2, 2022)

Sources for family trees:

== Entertainment ==
Year	Title	Network	Subject(s)	Notes
2007–2021	Keeping Up with the Kardashians	E!	Kardashian–Jenner family	E! Network; 20 Seasons
2009–2010	Kourtney and Khloe Take Miami	E!	Kourtney & Khloé Kardashian	E!; 2 Seasons
2011–2012	Kourtney and Kim Take New York	E!	Kourtney & Kim Kardashian, Scott Disick; Kris Humphries (Season 2)	2 Seasons
2011–2012	Khloé & Lamar	E!	Khloé & Lamar Odom	2 Seasons
2013	Kourtney and Kim Take Miami	E!	Kourtney & Kim Kardashian	1 Season
2013	Kris	Fox	Kris Jenner	Syndicated talk show; 1 Season
2014–2015	Kourtney and Khloé Take The Hamptons	E!	Kourtney & Khloé Kardashian, Scott Disick	1 Season
2015	Dash Dolls	E!	Dash Boutique Employees	1 Season; Executive produced by Kris Jenner, Kim, Kourtney & Khloé Kardashian
2015	I Am Cait	E!	Caitlyn Jenner	Docu-series
2016	Kocktails with Khloé	FYI	Khloé Kardashian	FYE; Variety talk show; 1 Season
2016	Rob & Chyna	E!	Rob Kardashian & Blac Chyna	1 Season
2017–2019	Revenge Body with Khloé Kardashian	E!	Khloé Kardashian	3 Seasons
2017	Life of Kylie	E!	Kylie Jenner & Jordyn Woods	1 Season
2022–present	The Kardashians	Hulu	Kardashian–Jenner family	Hulu; 8 Seasons

== See also ==
- Celebrity
- List of entertainment industry dynasties
- List of show business families
