= Dash Dolls =

American reality television series

- Genre: Reality television
- Starring: Malika Haqq; Khadijah Haqq McCray; Durrani Aisha Popal; Stephanie De Souza; Caroline "Alien" Burt; Taylor Cuqua; Melody "Mel" Rae Kandil; Jennifer Robi; Alexisamor "Lexi" Ramierz; Melissa "Missy" Flores
- Theme music composer: Nate Dodge
- Country of origin: United States
- Original language: English
- No. of seasons: 1
- No. of episodes: 8

Production
- Executive producers: Gil Goldschein; Jeff Jenkins; Farnaz Farjam; Claudia Frank; Kris Jenner; Ryan Seacrest; Kim Kardashian; Kourtney Kardashian; Khloé Kardashian
- Running time: 42 minutes
- Production companies: Bunim/Murray Productions; Ryan Seacrest Productions; Kardashians

Original release
- Network: E!
- Release: September 20 – November 8, 2015

Related
- Keeping Up with the Kardashians

Dash Dolls is an American reality television series that premiered on the E! cable network, on September 20, 2015. The show is a spin-off of Keeping Up with the Kardashians. The series features a group of young female employees, referred to as Dash Dolls, working in the Dash boutique in Hollywood which is owned by the Kardashian sisters.

== Production ==
=== Development ===
The series was greenlit on March 26, 2014. The show is broadcast on E!, an American cable network which features mostly entertainment-related programming and reality television series. The network has ordered eight hour-long episodes. The show is the sixth series installment in the Keeping Up with the Kardashians franchise, following Kourtney and Khloé Take The Hamptons, and the first one not featuring any members of the Kardashian family as the main cast. The series is produced by Bunim/Murray Productions and Ryan Seacrest Productions, the same companies which produce Keeping Up with the Kardashians and their spin-offs; Gil Goldschein, Jeff Jenkins, Farnaz Farjam and Claudia Frank serve as executive producers, along with the Kardashian sisters and Kris Jenner. The network describes the premise of the show as:

This new generation of boutique girls take on the glamorous lifestyle that comes with managing one of today's most recognizable franchises, owned by three famous and often demanding bosses, while juggling romances, parties, family drama and other career aspirations.

Dash is a chain of retail stores which was founded in 2006 by the Kardashian sisters. There are several stores operating in the United States; the reality series is set in a boutique located in West Hollywood, which was opened in 2012 when the store was relocated from its original location in Calabasas, California. On April 5, 2015, the network aired an episode of Keeping Up with the Kardashians involving a storyline which featured the Dash dolls for whom Khloé Kardashian organized a teambuilding retreat; Molly Mulshine of The New York Observer noted that the episode "conveniently introduced to the future stars of Dash Dolls." The sneak peek of the show was released on May 31, 2015. Malika Haqq, one of the main cast members of the show, discussed the development of the show by saying:

It is exciting everyday for us. It is so many levels. Working in the store, we know what that’s like, but as soon as the cameras came on, we were like, “There’s magic here. This would make for a really great show.”

Haqq and her twin sister Khadijah had served as co-managers of the retail store before the television series occurred. "We did not put out any signs like ‘Yo we want a show.’ It didn't happen like that. Khloé and Kourtney asked us if we could help them out. [...] They needed somebody that they could trust," Malika Haqq discussed doing business with the Kardashians. Haqq also noted that working in the store has always resembled a television show because of its unique environment and famous owners. "Ultimately when you put a large group of girls together, you're game to get a bunch of drama," Haqq also added. Kim Kardashian has disclosed that she initially wanted Keeping Up with the Kardashians to focus more on their stores in order to bring people's attention and later said that she "didn’t think it would turn into what it turned into."

=== Cast ===
The cast of Dash Dolls

The reality series chronicles the daily life of the employees working in one of the Dash boutiques. The show features Khloé Kardashian’s best friend Malika Haqq, who has also been appearing on Keeping Up with the Kardashians, and her twin sister, Khadijah Haqq, who both act as co-managers of the store. The cast also includes store's merchandising manager Durrani Aisha Popal, sales associates Stephanie De Souza, Caroline Burt, Taylor Cuqua, and Melody "Mel" Rae Kandil, assistant manager Nazy Farnoosh, store manager Jennifer Robi, sales coordinator Alexisamor "Lexi" Ramierz, and media and marketing expert Melissa "Missy" Flores. The Kardashian sisters, who own the store, are also expected to make guest appearances throughout the show. According to the press release issued by the network, the cast of the series is characterized as:

Now viewers will have the opportunity to follow the lives of the Kardashian sisters' young, fun and hot employees as they navigate the hectic life of a twentysomething in Hollywood while representing the Kardashian brand.

== Episodes ==
No.	Title	Original release date	U.S. viewers (millions)
1	"Valley of the Dash Dolls"	September 20, 2015	0.57
Kourtney, Kim and Khloé introduce the viewers to the DASH store and the dolls that work there. Durrani starts dating a man named Shalom but worries that her Islamic family will disprove of her dating a Jewish man. At the DASH Dolls house, Taylor and Melody get into a fight over Taylor's partying ways. Malika and Khadijah decide they want to get their career back on track and after meeting a photographer at the Playboy Mansion, they decide to do a nude photo shoot. However, Khadijah is reluctant from the start and Malika does the fully nude shots alone after the sisters argue and Khadijah leaves the shoot.
2	"Little Pink Lies"	September 27, 2015	0.64
Durrani's boyfriend, Shalom, surprises her with a pink Bentley for her birthday and Durrani is overwhelmed. However, when Durrani later crashes the car and tells Shalom it was Nazy, she feels bad for lying to him. After Durrani opens up about past relationships and trust issues with Shalom, they both agree to be honest with each other. Stephanie's boyfriend of four years, Colin, has been admitted to rehab and she worries for him, later breaking down in a conversation with Caroline when she reveals his dark past. With Stephanie's boyfriend not around, Durrani and Nazy decide to set her up on a blind date with Jordan, Durrani's friend. However Stephanie tells them she is committed to Colin. Malika and Khadijah celebrate their nude photo shoot with an official press launch but they still have not spoken since Khadijah ditched Malika. They later make-up and realize they were both wrong.
3	"Doll Versus Doll"	October 4, 2015	0.53
Durrani and Lexi are the two dolls who have been working at DASH the longest, getting the nickname "OG Girls." However, Durrani and Lexi have not been seeing eye to eye, especially when Lexi reports Durrani to store manager Jennifer over her using her phone in the toilets during work hours. As a result Durrani gets a warning write-up leading to boss Khloé stepping in. Durrani and Lexi later resolve their issues over dinner with Lexi telling Durrani she does not want to be left out of the group. Taylor and her boyfriend Ryan start to experience problems in their one-year-long relationship. After an argument where Ryan grabs Taylor's hair she finally breaks things off with him, calling it a permanent split.
4	"Momma Drama"	October 11, 2015	0.50
Caroline's mom, Gahl Burt, comes to visit Caroline in LA which worries her as she and her mom do not have a very close bond. Caroline tells the dolls that her parents sent her away to the wilderness as a teenager which made her see her mom in a negative light. With Gahl disapproving of Caroline choosing to have a career in music and fashion and not politics like her parents, they clash at one of Caroline's deejaying events. When Gahl refuses to meet Caroline's friend, Ronnie, Caroline realizes she needs to get her mom to understand that she is who she is and has a great circle of friends around her. Gahl later meets Ronnie at a charity event hosted by Caroline, and Gahl agrees to support Caroline. Malika has been dating a man for around four months but he is still technically married. This worries Khadijah and Khloé, and when the pair later split, Malika visits a therapist to vent her emotions and talk about how her dad left her at a young age and how she has cut ties with him. Kim gives Stephanie a promotion because of her hard work at the store and Nazy later gives Stephanie her first driving lesson.
5	"Taylor Breaks Bro Code"	October 18, 2015	0.40
While out on a night out with the rest of the dolls (excluding Stephanie), Taylor bumps into her ex-boyfriend Ryan's best friend Derek. When Derek later asks Taylor for her and the dolls to come to Miami for an event he is involved in, Taylor is overjoyed and invites as many of the dolls as possible. Derek also promises the girls can stay at the Versace Mansion. Taylor, Nazy, Melody, Durrani and Durrani's boyfriend Shalom all come along for the trip as wall as Nazy's new boyfriend Josh, who she is introducing to the group for the first time. Also after a few too many drinks Taylor and Derek kiss, with Taylor later explaining to Melody at the beach that she is not ready for any relationship. When Derek throws a yacht party for the group he and Taylor agree to stay as just friends. Durrani realises she wants her relationship with Shalom to go far and when she later tries on wedding dresses, despite not being engaged, Shalom gets concerned over their clashing religions. However, Durrani proves she is committed by throwing a Jewish dinner for Shalom, his cousin and his cousin's wife. Khadijah decides she wants to get her children's names tattooed onto her wrist and Malika and Khloé go along to the tattoo parlour for moral support.
6	"Dash Dolls Take New York"	October 25, 2015	0.36
Caroline starts spending an increasing amount of time with her friend, Ronnie Radke, of the band Falling in Reverse and when Ronnie invites Caroline and the dolls to a concert in New York City, Caroline is thrilled but is unsure of what their relationship is. Caroline, Taylor and Melody all head off to NYC for Ronnie's concert and whilst there, Melody gets the opportunity of a lifetime to shoot a high profile fashion shoot which could help further her modelling career. When Melody arrives at the shoot she is excited but when the photographer suggests fully nude shots, Melody is concerned about how her Christian family will react but goes along with the shots anyway which turn out successful. On their final night in New York, the girls hit up the concert and Taylor makes Caroline question where she wants her friendship with Ronnie to go. When back in LA, Caroline opens up to Ronnie and they end up sharing a passionate first kiss. Caroline later meets Ronnie's father when attending another concert in LA with Missy. Stephanie breaks the rules regarding her boyfriend, Colin, and his rehab by meeting up with him. This leads to Colin being thrown out of rehab and he ends up getting sent to jail in front of Stephanie. Stephanie later visits him in prison and also sees a therapist to discuss her emotions and understand where she was wrong in breaking the rules.
7	"Into the Wilderness"	November 1, 2015	0.48
Caroline and Ronnie's relationship begins to get more serious and she decides it would be best for the rest of the dolls to get to know him. She organises a camping trip and invites as many of the dolls as possible to come along. At the DASH dolls house, before leaving for camping, Durrani and Ronnie clash over one of Durrani's comments but Durrani believes he is no good for Caroline. When camping Stephanie also clashes with Ronnie over him commenting on her taking too many selfies. Durrani and Stephanie both tell Caroline that Ronnie is being disrespectful to them and Caroline talks to him about this and Ronnie agrees to try harder. Taylor, along with Derek, tell her ex Ryan about what happened between her and Derek in Miami and Ryan reacts negatively. Taylor later says she thinks that will be the last time she sees Ryan. Taylor also starts hanging out with Shalom, Durrani's boyfriend, much to Durrani's displeasure and Durrani later tells Taylor that she hopes there is nothing going on and Taylor tells her Shalom is just a good friend. Malika and Khadijah visit the NYC DASH store and later on Malika receives the news that her ex has died and she is inconsolable but realises she has to move forward. Stephanie reveals that she is seeing cracks in her and Colin's relationship.
8	"Dash Doll Shake-up"	November 8, 2015	0.54
Durrani is nervous about revealing her relationship with Shalom to her brother, Abdullah, who is visiting her in L.A. She invites the two to the house in an effort for them to get to know each other and for Abdullah to understand the nature of their relationship, but it backfires and he is unable to accept the fact that she is dating outside her religion. She later reveals to Nazy that he told her parents about Shalom, and that her parents do not wish to contact her anymore. Durrani meets with Shalom to discuss their future together, and she reveals that she is willing to convert to Judaism in order for them to get married and live happily together. Stephanie's relationship with Colin looks hopeful after he is released from jail, but she soon discovers that he has been taking drugs again which leads to a fight. She asks Caroline to put Colin in contact with a friend who works at a rehabilitation centre, and Colin agrees to go for a meeting, but when he is interrogated by one of the support workers he storms out leaving Stephanie behind. Stephanie tells the support workers that she cannot keep doing this with Colin and she realises it is best for them not to be in a relationship. Meanwhile, Melody has been struggling to juggle her modelling career with her duties at the DASH Boutique, which concerns Malika and Khadijah. Khloe ultimately tells them that Melody should be fired due to her little interest for work, and more for her modelling career. After receiving her last pay cheque, Melody returns to the house to tell the other dolls, who all share an emotional moment together with tears.

== Reception ==
Amy Amatangelo, reviewing the show for The Hollywood Reporter, showed very little excitement by saying that "you've seen everything here before," and noticed very much resemblance to other reality television series, including "The Real Housewives, The Real World and the mother ship: Keeping Up with the Kardashians." Amatangelo also noted "lots of staged conversations and conflicts" and "beyond awkward" product placement. Mark Perigard from Boston Herald said that "the franchise may have at last hit bottom," judging the show prior to its premiere.

== Broadcast ==
The show premiered on September 20, 2015, in the United States on the E! cable network at 9/8pm ET/PT, following a new episode of Keeping Up with the Kardashians. The series continued to air on every Sunday night in the same timeslot. The show finished airing its eight-episode season on November 8, 2015. The series is additionally broadcast on local versions of the network worldwide; in Australia the series premiered on September 22, and in the United Kingdom on September 27, 2015. All the episodes are also available in numerous streaming video on demand services, including Amazon Video, iTunes, Google Play, and Microsoft Movies & TV.

== See also ==
- Kourtney and Khloé Take Miami
- Kourtney and Kim Take New York
- Khloé & Lamar
