= Filthy Rich: Cattle Drive =

- Also known as: Rich Kids: Cattle Drive
- Genre: Reality
- Created by: Joe Simpson; Justin Berfield; Jason Felts
- Country of origin: United States
- No. of seasons: 1
- No. of episodes: 8

Production
- Executive producers: Justin Berfield; Jason Felts; Brady Connell; Joe Simpson; James A. Jusko
- Producers: Gregory Carroll; Heath Luman
- Running time: 22–24 minutes
- Production companies: JT Television; Base Camp Films; J2TV

Original release
- Network: E!
- Release: August 7 – October 9, 2005

Filthy Rich: Cattle Drive is an American reality television program that aired on the E! network in 2005. On E! Australia it aired as Rich Kids: Cattle Drive.

== Synopsis ==
The show involves a City Slickers/The Simple Life-like premise, with the privileged children of celebrities working on a Colorado cattle ranch. The television series was created by Justin Berfield and produced by his J2TV producing partner, Jason Felts, as well as Joe Simpson. The show premiered August 7, 2005.

== Cast ==
- Kourtney Kardashian — daughter of attorney Robert Kardashian and socialite Kris Jenner. She has since appeared on the reality shows The Simple Life, Keeping Up with the Kardashians, Kourtney and Khloé Take Miami, Kourtney and Kim Take New York, and Kourtney and Khloé Take The Hamptons.
- George Foreman III — son of boxer George Foreman. He is executive vice president of George Foreman Enterprises, Inc.
- Shanna Ferrigno — daughter of bodybuilder Lou Ferrigno. She has a recurring role as Nurse Janice in Days of Our Lives and appeared in the NBC series Windfall, as well as the telemovie Within.
- Noah Blake — son of actor Robert Blake. His acting career began in 1987 with guest roles in various American television series including sitcoms like Married... with Children and progressed to supporting roles in shows like Harry and the Hendersons and General Hospital. He starred as Rhet in the cult favorite film Teen Witch (1989). In the 1990s, he moved on to guest roles in action-adventure series like JAG and ER. In 2005, he guest starred on LAX.
- Brittny Gastineau — daughter of NFL footballer Mark Gastineau and Lisa Gastineau. She had previously starred in another reality show, The Gastineau Girls, and later had a guest appearance on Keeping Up with the Kardashians.
- Fabian Basabe — son of an Ecuadorian businessman. In 2005 he married Martina Borgomanero, heir to the La Perla clothing company.
- Courtenay Semel — daughter of then Yahoo! CEO Terry Semel.
- Alex A. Quinn — son of Mexican-born actor Anthony Quinn. His credits include Lake Dead, The Curse of Alcatraz, Last Goodbye, An Existential Affair, and Starving Hysterical Naked. Quinn was named one of W magazine's "Hollywood's Hottest Kids to Watch" and one of America's Most Eligible Bachelors by Complete Woman magazine in 2007.
- Haley Giraldo — daughter of singer Pat Benatar and Neil Giraldo. She was the 2002 "Miss Golden Globe" and once toured with her mother as part of an all-female band called GLO.
- The Hon. Alexander Clifford — son of The Right Honourable Thomas Clifford, 14th Baron Clifford of Chudleigh.
