= Kardashian Konfidential =

2010 non-fiction book by the Kardashian family

- Author: Kim Kardashian; Khloé Kardashian; Kourtney Kardashian
- Language: English
- Genre: Autobiography
- Published: 256
- Publisher: St. Martin's Press
- Publication date: November 2010
- Publication place: United States
- ISBN: 978-0-312-62807-9
- Followed by: Dollhouse

Kardashian Konfidential is a 2010 non-fiction book by Kim Kardashian, Kourtney Kardashian, and Khloé Kardashian that features aspects of autobiography and self-help and contains family photos, personal letters, and diary entries. It was listed on The New York Times Best Seller list in late 2010. Kardashian Konfidential is the first book published by the Kardashian sisters.

== Synopsis ==
The book contains personal stories, photographs, and diary entries from each of the three sisters. Among the personal stories, Khloé discusses her regret about losing her virginity at age 14 to an older boyfriend, writing "Feeling rushed and pressured and unsure should have been my clue that I wasn't ready to take that step." Kim discusses being starstruck by meeting many celebrities she had admired. Kourtney talks about her obsessive need for neatness and organization in her home. All three write about their late father, attorney Robert Kardashian. They also write about their father's friendship with O. J. Simpson and their memories of the O. J. Simpson trial in 1995 and the effect it had on their family.

In addition to personal stories, the book contains advice about makeup, style, and dating. In regards to dating, Kim Kardashian writes in the book "When no one in your family likes a person, there's got to be something to it," referring to her unsuccessful relationship with her second husband.

== Reception ==
The book made The New York Times Best Seller list, and reached #31 on the USA Today Best seller list.

Breia Brissey of Entertainment Weekly wrote of the book, "it's all relatively endearing coming from this bunch, and a must-read for any true Kardashian fan." She also noted that while the book does share a lot of personal information about the family, it largely ignores anything negative such as the details of Kim's first marriage.
