= Kourtney Kardashian =

American media personality (born 1979)

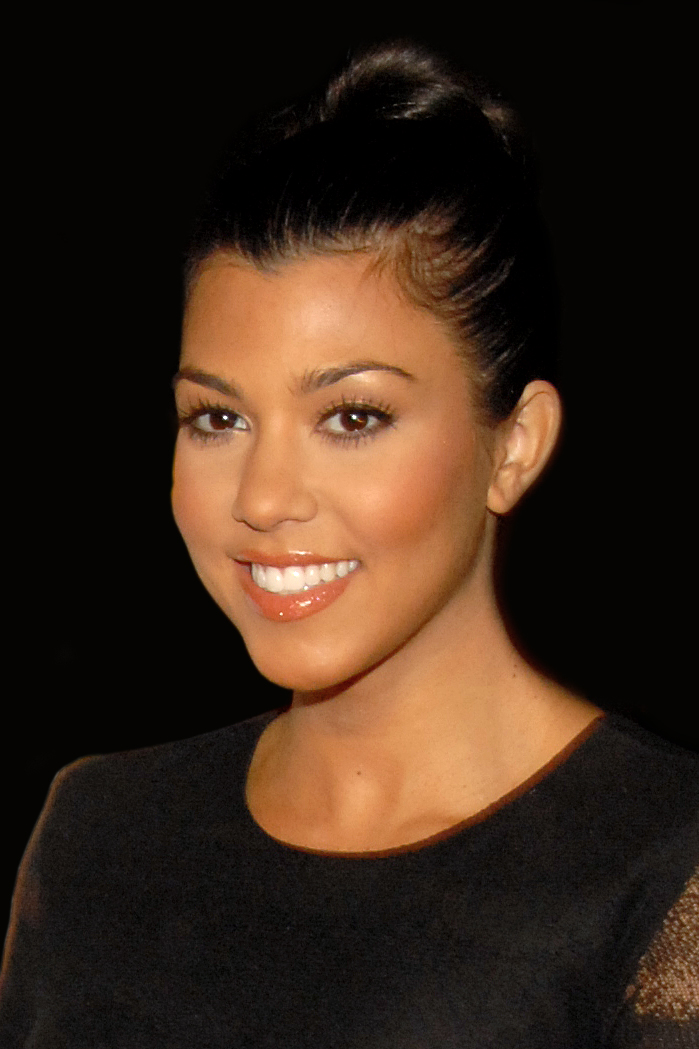
- Kardashian in 2009
- Born: Kourtney Mary Kardashian; April 18, 1979 (age 47); Los Angeles, California, U.S.
- Other name: Kourtney Kardashian Barker
- Education: University of Arizona (BA)
- Occupations: Media personality; businesswoman
- Years active: 2003–present
- Spouse: Travis Barker (m. 2022)
- Partner: Scott Disick (2006–2015)
- Children: 4
- Parents: Robert Kardashian; Kris Jenner
- Relatives: Kardashian family

Kourtney Mary Kardashian Barker (born April 18, 1979) is an American media personality, socialite and businesswoman. In 2007, she and her family began starring in the reality television series Keeping Up with the Kardashians. Its success led to the creation of spin-offs including Kourtney and Kim Take Miami and Kourtney and Kim Take New York. After she and her family made the decision to end their show after 20 seasons in 2021, they began appearing in an all new reality television series titled The Kardashians on Hulu in 2022.

With sisters Kim and Khloé, Kardashian is involved in the retail and fashion industries. They have launched several clothing collections and fragrances, and additionally released the book Kardashian Konfidential in 2010. Kourtney launched her own website called Poosh in early 2019, and a new health brand Lemme in 2022.

Kardashian and her siblings are popular on social media and endorse products such as waist slimming pants, beauty products, Coca-Cola, and prescription drugs, for which they are paid (as of 2016) between $75,000 and $300,000 per post on Instagram, Facebook, and Twitter.

== Early life ==
Kourtney Mary Kardashian was born in Los Angeles, California, on April 18, 1979, to Robert Kardashian and Kris (née Houghton). She has two younger sisters, Kim and Khloé, and a younger brother, Rob. In 1991, her parents divorced and her mother married Caitlyn Jenner, the 1976 Summer Olympics decathlon winner (formerly Bruce Jenner (Note: Jenner changed her name due to gender transition in 2015.)), later that year. Through their marriage, Kardashian gained stepbrothers Burt, Brandon, and Brody; stepsister Casey; and later half-sisters Kendall and Kylie.

Kardashian attended Marymount High School, a Roman Catholic all-girls school in Los Angeles. Following graduation, she moved to Dallas, Texas, to attend Southern Methodist University for two years. Kardashian then lived in Tucson, Arizona. She graduated from the University of Arizona, where she was a member of Alpha Phi, with a bachelor's degree in Theatre Arts and a minor in Spanish. Her classmates included Nicole Richie and Luke Walton. In 1994, her father garnered public attention as an additional defense lawyer for football player O. J. Simpson during his murder trial.

== Career ==
=== Reality television ===
Kardashian became known to reality-television audiences in 2005, when she appeared on the reality series Filthy Rich: Cattle Drive, which took the children of notably wealthy families to a Colorado ranch to raise money for charity.

In February 2007, a sex tape involving her younger sister Kim was leaked, which largely contributed to her rise to prominence. Later that year, Kardashian's mother, Kris Jenner met with Ryan Seacrest to pursue a reality television show based on her family. Seacrest, who had his own production company, decided to develop the idea, having the popular family-based show The Osbournes in his mind. The show eventually was picked up to air on the E! cable network, with Kardashian's mother acting as the executive producer. The series debuted on October 14, 2007, and revolved around Kardashian, along with her parents, mother Kris and stepparent Caitlyn as well as her siblings Kim, Khloé, Kendall, Kylie and Rob. The title of their reality television series Keeping Up with the Kardashians, and it chronicles the personal and professional lives of their family members. The series proved successful for E!, the network on which it is broadcast, and led to several spin-offs.

In April 2009, Kardashian and her sister Khloe announced that they were contracted to star in a spin-off that would follow their move to launch a second DASH boutique in Miami, Florida. The series, Kourtney and Khloé Take Miami, debuted on E! on August 16, 2009. Kardashian and her sisters Kim and Khloe made a cameo appearance in the Season 3 premiere of the series 90210. Kardashian would be a central cast member in the spin-offs Kourtney and Kim Take New York (2011–12), Kourtney and Kim Take Miami (2013), and Kourtney and Khloé Take the Hamptons (2014), all of which highlighted Kardashian and her sisters expanding their Dash boutiques to the titles respective locations.

In 2021, Kardashian and her family announced that their reality show, Keeping Up With the Kardashians, would be ending after twenty seasons and almost 15 years on air.

=== Fashion and business ventures ===
In 2003, Kourtney and her mother Kris opened the high-end children's boutique Smooch in Calabasas, California. The boutique operated for six years before closing in 2009. In 2006, alongside sisters Kim and Khloé, Kardashian established DASH, a high-end women's clothing boutique also located in Calabasas.

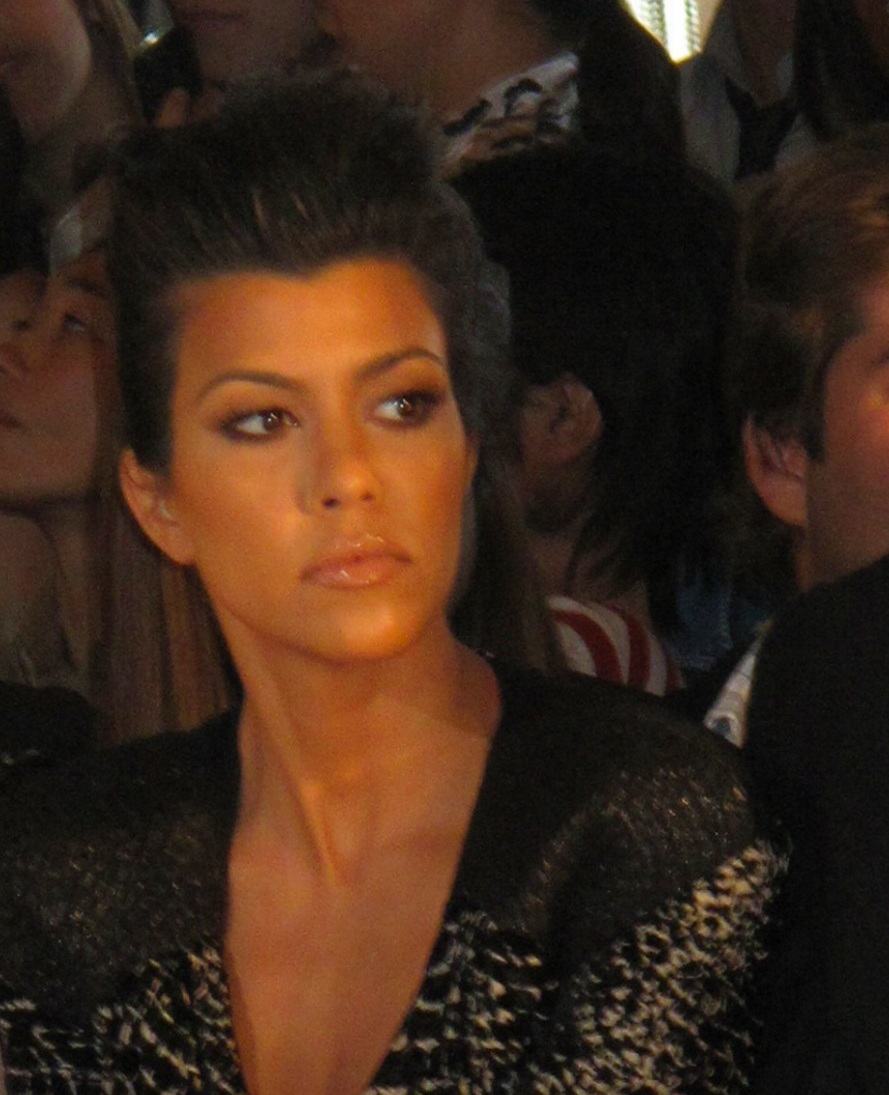
Kardashian in 2010

In March 2010, The three sisters released a 20-piece collection of jewelry line for the company Virgins, Saints, and Angels, in March 2010. The jewelry is reflective of their partial Armenian background. In the spring of 2010, Kardashian and her sisters released a clothing line for Bebe. In August 2010, Kardashian announced that she and her sisters were working on another clothing line called K-Dash, sold on QVC. Later that year, they also created a sunless tanner called Kardashian Glamour Tan. Kardashian co-wrote the book Kardashian Konfidential with her sisters Khloe and Kim; released in November 2010. Kardashian made her acting debut with a guest appearance on the ABC soap One Life to Live on March 28, 2011, appearing as attorney Kassandra Kavanaugh. In November 2011 she released a novel Dollhouse along with sisters Khloe and Kim.

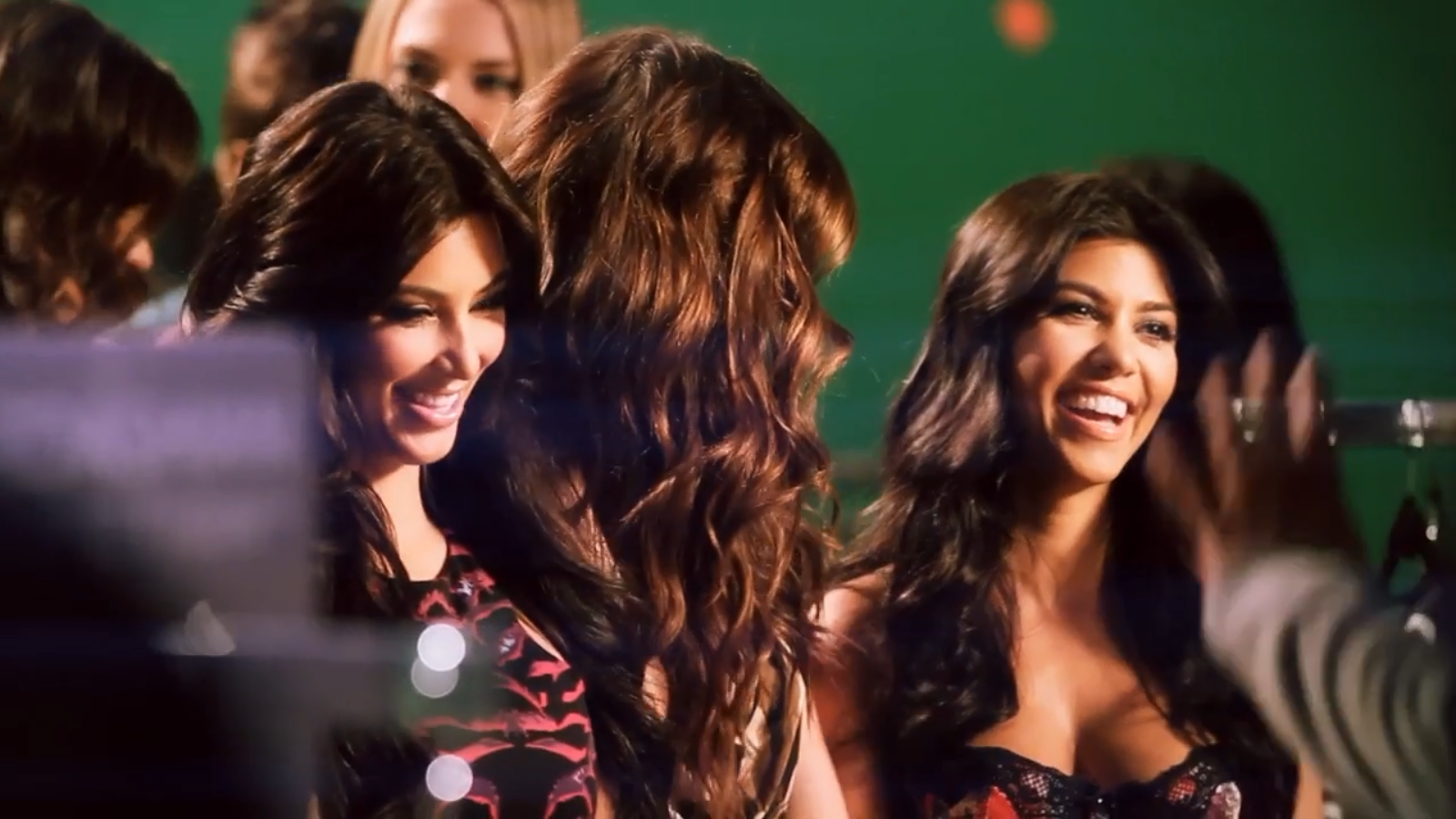
Kardashian beside her sisters Khloé and Kim, 2013

The Kardashian sisters were spokeswomen for the diet supplement Quick Trim. In March 2012, the three sisters were named in a $5 million class-action lawsuit against QuickTrim. The complaint, filed in the United States District Court for the Southern District of New York, accused the Kardashians, along with QuickTrim's manufacturer Windmill Health Products; the retailer GNC; and others in the sales and marketing chain, of false and deceptive marketing. The plaintiffs, from several states, brought claims under their respective states' consumer protection laws. In 2017, Kardashian launched her first solo fashion line as part of a collaboration with the site PrettyLittleThing. According to the website, the 32-piece line was inspired by Studio 54, classical Hollywood cinema, and the 1970s. She endorsed Calvin Klein along with her sisters in 2018. In the same year, she partnered with half-sister Kylie to launch a collection of lipsticks and palettes with Kylie Cosmetics.

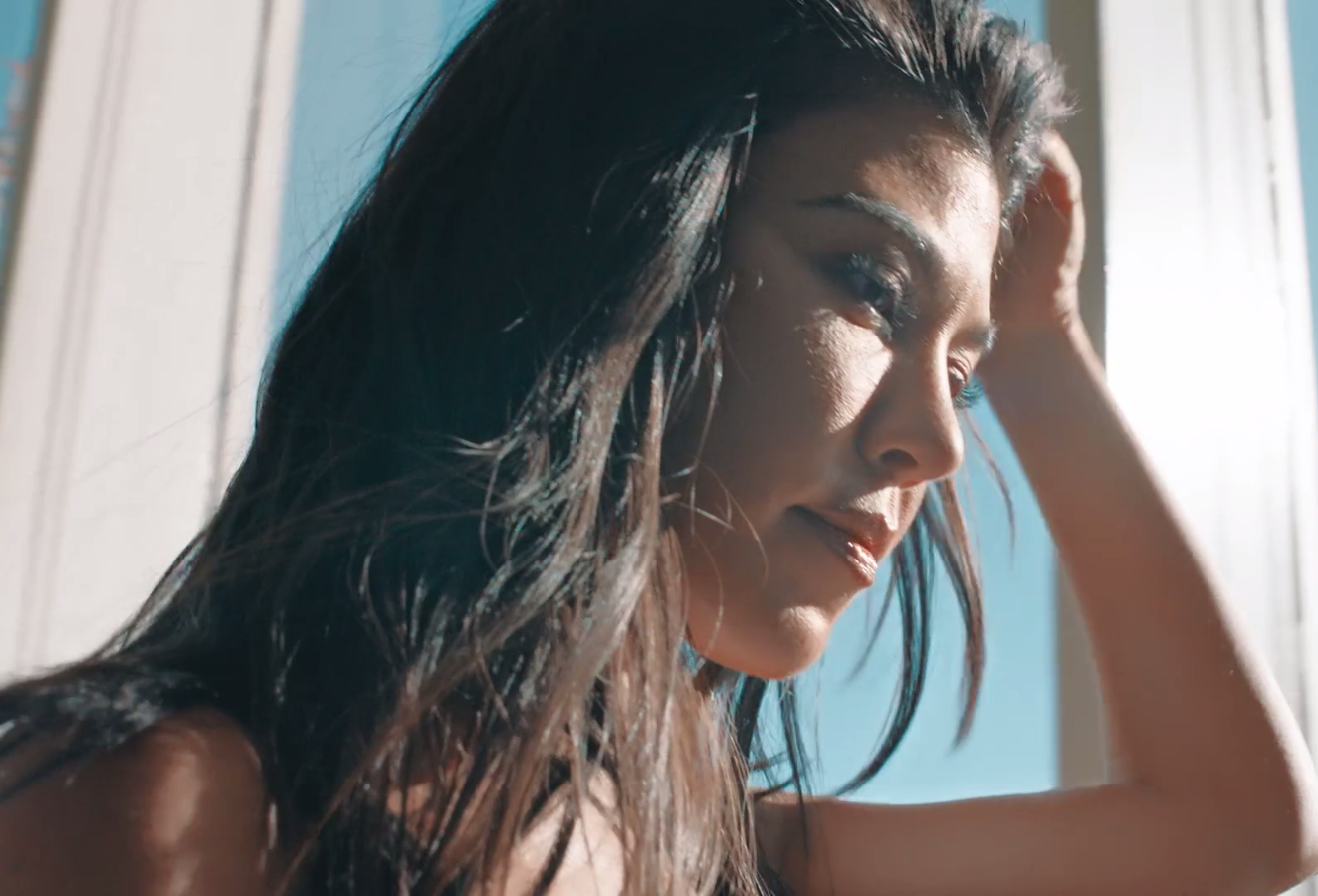
Kardashian for GQ photoshoot in 2018

On March 5, 2019, Kardashian released her lifestyle website named Poosh. In November 2019, Kardashian partnered with her sisters Kim and Khloé to create three new perfumes (one for each sister) for Kim's brand KKW Fragrance. The collection introduced Yellow Diamond (Kourtney's fragrance).

Also in 2021, Kardashian made a cameo in the teen romantic comedy film He's All That, appearing as Jessica Miles Tores, a woman who sponsors on social media.

On September 12, 2022, Kardashian announced the launch of her new health brand Lemme, which started selling three products. The brand specialises in vitamins and gummy supplements.

In April 2022, Kardashian and her family returned to the television screens with their brand new reality television show, titled The Kardashians, after they left the E! Network to join Hulu. The show features Kardashian, alongside her family. The first season premiered on April 14, 2022. The show was renewed for a second and third season in late 2022. The third season officially aired on May 25, 2023.

== Personal life ==
In October 2019, Kardashian and her children were baptized in an Armenian Apostolic ceremony at the Etchmiadzin Cathedral in Vagharshapat, Armenia. During the ceremony, she was christened with the Armenian name Gayane.

In October 2020, Kardashian posted messages and retweets in support of Armenia and Artsakh in regards to the Nagorno-Karabakh war.

=== Relationships and children ===
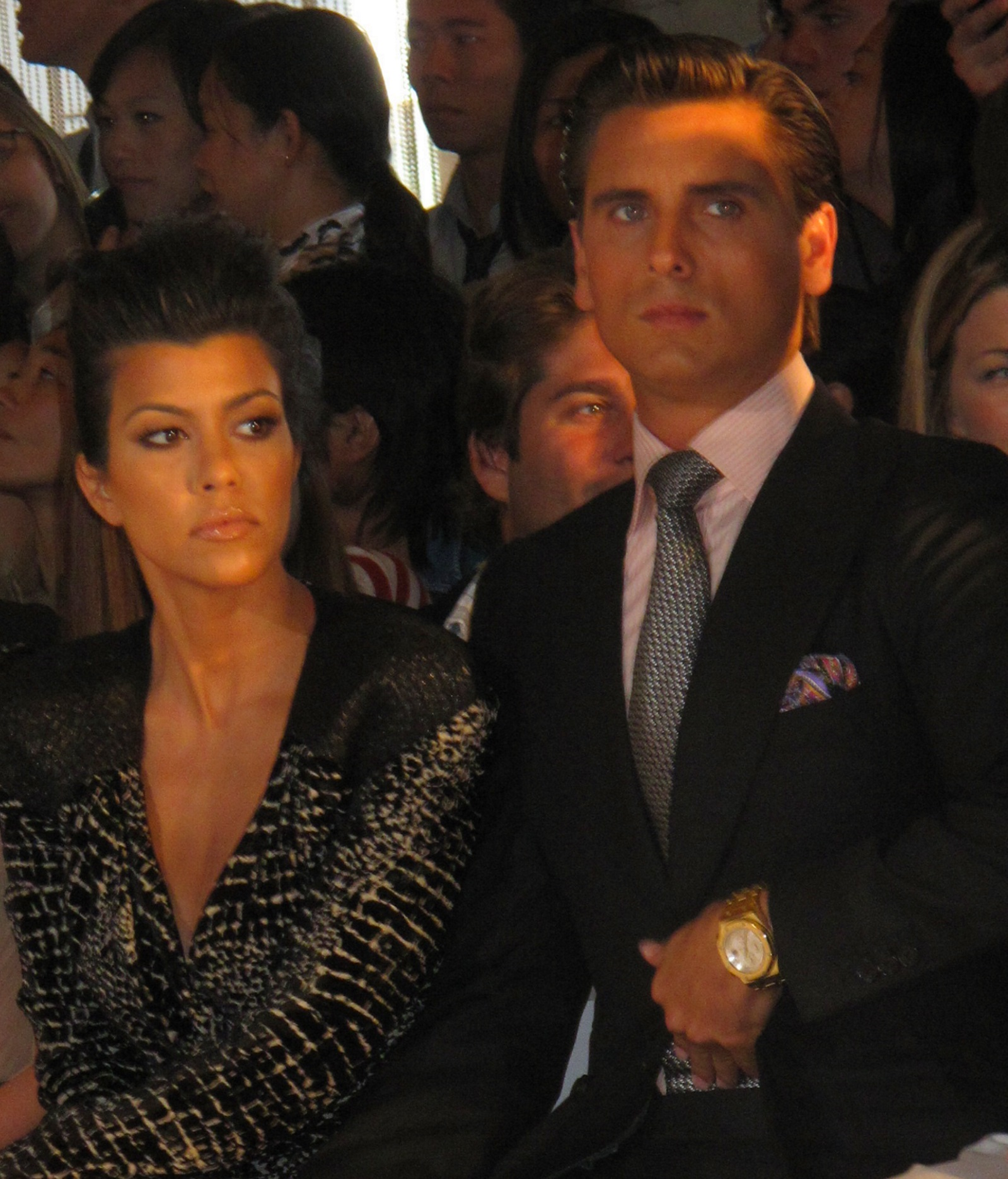
Kardashian beside her boyfriend at the time Scott Disick, 2010

From 2006 to 2015, Kardashian was in an on-again, off-again relationship with Scott Disick. Kardashian has three children with Disick: two sons and one daughter. Kardashian and Disick's relationship was featured on Keeping Up With the Kardashians and its numerous spin offs. Kardashian's pregnancies and the births of the first three of her children were also featured on the show.

Kardashian was in another on-again, off-again relationship with model Younes Bendjima from 2016 to 2020.

In January 2021, it was confirmed that Kardashian was in a relationship with musician Travis Barker. In October 2021, Kardashian and Barker got engaged after he proposed to her at a beachside hotel in Montecito, California. They had an unofficial wedding on April 3, 2022, in Las Vegas, after the 64th Annual Grammy Awards. The couple officially married on May 15, 2022, in Santa Barbara, California, with a religious wedding ceremony in Portofino, Italy on May 22, 2022. On November 4, 2023, it was announced that the couple's first child, a son, had been born. Before becoming naturally pregnant with her son, she went through five failed cycles of IVF and three retrievals.

== Filmography ==
=== As actress ===
Year	Title	Role	Notes
2011	One Life to Live	Kassandra Kavanaugh	Episode: "March 28, 2011"
2021	He's All That	Jessica Miles Torres	Movie

=== As herself ===
Year	Title	Notes
2005	Filthy Rich: Cattle Drive	Participant
2007–2021	Keeping Up with the Kardashians	Main role
2009–2010	Kourtney and Khloe Take Miami	Main role
2011–2012	Kourtney and Kim Take New York	Main role
2011–2012	Khloé & Lamar	4 episodes
2013	Kourtney and Kim Take Miami	Main role
2014–2015	Kourtney and Khloé Take The Hamptons	Main role
2015	I Am Cait	2 episodes
2015	Dash Dolls	Episode: "Valley of the Dash Dolls"
2022–present	The Kardashians	Main role
2026	Travis Barker: Louder Than Fear	

== Written works ==
- Kardashian, Kim; Kardashian, Kourtney; Kardashian, Khloé (2010). Kardashian Konfidential. St. Martin's Press. ISBN 978-0-312-62807-9.
- Kardashian, Kim; Kardashian, Kourtney; Kardashian, Khloé (2011). Dollhouse. William Morrow and Company. ISBN 9780062063847.

== See also ==
- List of celebrities who own cannabis businesses
