= Kourtney and Khloé Take The Hamptons =

- Genre: Reality television
- Starring: Kourtney Kardashian; Khloé Kardashian; Scott Disick
- Opening theme: "L.A. Love (La La)" by Fergie
- Country of origin: United States
- Original language: English
- No. of seasons: 1
- No. of episodes: 10

Production
- Executive producers: Farnaz Farjam; Gil Goldschein; Jeff Jenkins; Jonathan Murray; Kris Jenner; Melissa Bidwell; Russell Jay; Ryan Seacrest
- Camera setup: Multiple
- Running time: 42 minutes
- Production companies: Bunim/Murray Productions; Ryan Seacrest Productions

Original release
- Network: E!
- Release: November 2, 2014 – January 4, 2015

Related
- Keeping Up with the Kardashians; Kourtney and Kim Take Miami; Kourtney and Kim Take New York; Khloé & Lamar

Kourtney and Khloé Take The Hamptons is an American reality television series that premiered on E! on November 2, 2014. The series is the fourth spin-off show of Keeping Up with the Kardashians, following Kourtney and Kim Take Miami, Kourtney and Kim Take New York, and Khloé & Lamar. The show featured sisters Kourtney and Khloé Kardashian who opened a new D-A-S-H location in Southampton, New York.

The Kardashians' DASH boutique opened as a pop-up shop for the summer on the iconic Jobs Lane in Southampton Village. The family rented a home on a peninsula in the Hamptons hamlet of North Sea.

== Cast ==
- Kourtney Kardashian
- Khloé Kardashian
- Scott Disick

== Episodes ==
No.	Title	Original release date	U.S. viewers (millions)
1	"Trouble In Paradise"	November 2, 2014	1.57
Kourtney and Khloé relocate their new DASH store to the Hamptons. Khloe quickly jets out of the Hamptons to Africa. Kourtney and Scott's relationship begins to get rocky.
2	"What's That Racquet?"	November 9, 2014	1.72
After Kourtney tells Scott off for breaking the boundaries they've set for their relationship, Scott tries get back in her good graces.
3	"Party Crashing"	November 16, 2014	1.83
Kourtney flies to LA to confront Kim for using her home for North's birthday party without her permission; Scott finds himself in the hospital after excessive partying.
4	"12 Steps and 30 Candles"	November 23, 2014	1.52
Scott finally makes the decision to check into rehab, but his commitment to stay wavers with each day; Khloé struggles with the realization that her life isn't where she imagined it would be as her 30th birthday gets closer.
5	"Aftershocks"	November 30, 2014	2.05
Kourtney and Scott try to steer clear of repeating their past mistakes; Kim starts to doubt her best friend's loyalty when family secrets are leaked to the media.
6	"Kaptain Kourtney and Skipper Scott"	December 7, 2014	1.80
Khloé arranges for her and Scott to host a podcast together, taking her support of Scott to another level; Kourtney declares that she is a trained sailor, Khloé and Scott elect to test her skills on the open water.
7	"Riding Dirty"	December 14, 2014	1.47
When Khloé revives her love for horseback riding, Scott and Kourtney make a bet on how long she will last; Kourtney and Kim try to break Kris's crabby mood.
8	"There's No Smoke Without Fire Island"	December 21, 2014	1.33
When Scott is consumed by his negative affiliations with the Hamptons, he chooses to leave early; Khloe and Kourtney hire a new Dash Doll as a favor to Bruce.
9	"A House Divided"	December 28, 2014	1.74
Scott is still not able to go into his late parents' house, so Kourtney starts fixing it up, hoping that she can convince him to keep it; Meanwhile, Kourtney gets upset when Khloé starts fraternizing with the Dash Dolls.
10	"Bye Bye Hamptons"	January 4, 2015	1.87
When Khloé enjoys a night of drinking, Kourtney gets angry and accuses her of recklessly putting Scott's sobriety in jeopardy. Meanwhile, after Malika drunkenly kisses Khloé, Khloé starts to question what their friendship really means.
