= Jeff Jenkins =

American screenwriter (born 1967)

- Born: Jeffrey Charles Jenkins; October 8, 1967 (age 59); Michigan
- Occupations: Television producer; director; screenwriter
- Years active: 2001–present
- Known for: Keeping Up with the Kardashians, The Simple Life, Total Divas
- Notable work: Coming Out Colton
- Website: www.jeffjenkinsproductions.com

Jeff Jenkins is an American producer known for his work in reality television. He is best known for producing The Simple Life, Total Divas, and Keeping Up with the Kardashians and Coming Out Colton.

== Career ==
=== Bunim/Murray Productions ===
Jenkins started working at Bunim/Murray Productions in 2001 and helped grow and expand the company. He later served as executive vice president until August 2016. In August 2016, Jenkins was promoted to co-president of Entertainment and Development the production company until he left Bunim/Murray Productions in November 2017.

At Bunim/Murray, Jenkins worked as an executive producer for Keeping Up with the Kardashians and its various spin-offs. Keeping Up with the Kardashians won multiple Teen Choice Awards, People's Choice Awards, and E! People's Choice Awards. Jenkins was a producer for Kourtney and Kim Take Miami, Kourtney and Kim Take New York, Khloé & Lamar, Dash Dolls, Rob & Chyna. Jenkins was a creator, producer, and writer for Kourtney and Khloé Take The Hamptons, which premiered in 2014. In 2015, Jenkins was an executive producer for I Am Cait, which covered Caitlyn Jenner's gender transition. The show was one of the most-watched unscripted series in 2015. In April 2016, the show tied with I Am Jazz for best Outstanding Reality Program at the 27th GLAAD Media Awards. In 2017, he was an executive producer for Life of Kylie.

=== Jeff Jenkins Productions ===
In 2018, Jenkins launched Jeff Jenkins Productions alongside 3 Ball Entertainment, which is based in Redondo Beach, California. Jeff Jenkins Productions is a full-service content and production company focusing on unscripted docuseries and celebrity-based reality television series.

In 2020, Jeff Jenkins Productions released Unfiltered: Paris Jackson & Gabriel Glenn on Facebook Watch. In 2021, Jenkins worked with Netflix to produce Bling Empire, which became one of the streaming service's most-watched docuseries at the time. The series was inspired by Crazy Rich Asians. The company is also producing My Unorthodox Life, which will follow Julia Haart, CEO of Elite World Group and former member of an ultra-Orthodox Jewish community. In 2021, Jeff Jenkins was the mastermind behind the controversial and uplifting reality series Coming Out Colton on Netflix. The series chronicled the coming out process of controversial reality star Colton Underwood which addressed his appearance on The Bachelor and the stalking and harassment allegations against his ex Cassie Randolph. The series premiered to major criticism with Esquire describing the series as "calculated" and Variety's Daniel D'Addario saying "'Coming Out Colton' is a distasteful extension of a brand that doesn’t mean much to begin with."

== Filmography ==
=== Television ===
Title	Year(s)	Functioned as				Notes	Ref.
Title	Year(s)	Director	Writer	Producer	Creator	Notes	Ref.
The Challenge	2003	Yes		Yes		Supervising producer, 15 episodes; Director, 2 episodes	
The Real World	2002–2004	Yes				Director, 30 episodes	
Road Rules	2007			Yes		1 episode	
The Simple Life	2003–2007			Yes			
Dr. Steve-O	2007			Yes		7 episodes	
Living Lohan	2008			Yes		9 episodes	
Ski Patrol	2008		Yes	Yes	Yes		
Old Skool with Terry and Gita	2008			Yes		3 episodes	
Styl'd	2009			Yes		5 episodes	
Kourtney & Kim Take Miami	2009–2013		Yes				
The Spin Crowd	2010			Yes			
Married to Rock	2010			Yes			
Khloé & Lamar	2010			Yes		1 episode	
Kourtney & Kim Take New York	2011–2012			Yes			
Mrs. Eastwood & Company	2012			Yes		8 episodes	
Kourtney & Khloé Take the Hamptons	2014–2015		Yes	Yes	Yes		
Dash Dolls	2015			Yes			
Little Women: Terra's Little Family	2015			Yes			
Stewarts & Hamiltons	2015			Yes			
Little Women: LA	2015			Yes		26 episodes	
Ozzy & Jack's World Detour	2016			Yes		1 episode	
Rob & Chyna	2016			Yes		1 episode	
Total Bellas	2016			Yes		1 episode	
The Gary Owen Show	2016			Yes		1 episode	
Keeping Up with the Kardashians	2007–2016			Yes			
I Am Cait	2015–2016			Yes			
Mariah's World	2016–2017			Yes		4 episodes	
Life of Kylie	2017			Yes			
So Cosmo	2017			Yes			
Undressed	2017			Yes			
Total Divas	2013–2019	Yes		Yes			
Unfiltered: Paris Jackson & Gabriel Glenn	2020			Yes			
Bling Empire	2021			Yes			
Coming Out Colton	2021		Yes	Yes	Yes	6 episodes	
The Secret Lives of Mormon Wives	2024–present			Yes		8 episodes	
