= Dollhouse (book) =

2011 novel written by Kim Kardashian, Khloe Kardashian and Kourtney Kardashian

- Author: Kim Kardashian; Khloe Kardashian; Kourtney Kardashian
- Genre: Fiction
- Published: November 15, 2011
- Publisher: William Morrow
- Publication place: United States
- Pages: 288
- ISBN: 9780062063847
- Followed by: Kardashian Konfidential

Dollhouse is a 2011 novel written by Kim Kardashian, Khloe Kardashian, and Kourtney Kardashian.The semi-autobiographical novel tells the story of the Romero sisters: Kamille, Kassidy, and Kyle. It was released on November 15, 2011. The novel is the second book published by the Kardashian sisters, following the non-fiction book Kardashian Konfidential which was published the previous year.

== Background ==
The Kardashians announced plans to publish the novel in May 2011. About the book, Kim Kardashian wrote on her website "The novel is based on our lives but we've added a lot of crazy fictional twists and turns. You'll have to decide for yourself which story lines are true to life, and which ones we dreamed up. LOL." The Kardashians also announced a contest to name the novel, with the winner receiving a cameo in the book. The winner was announced as Courtney Powell who chose the name Dollhouse.

== Plot ==
Sisters Kamille, Kassidy, and Kyle Romero live in California where their mother, Kat, owns a restaurant. Their father, David, made some bad business decisions that left the family broke upon his death. Kat is remarried to former professional baseball player Beau, who has two children of his own from a previous marriage. Despite the sisters helping their mother out at the restaurant, the entire family is struggling to survive financially.

The family's luck changes when Kamille is discovered by a modelling agent and becomes famous overnight. At a red carpet event she meets and later becomes engaged to a professional baseball player. The couple decide to have their wedding ceremony filmed for a television show. The wedding is called off after Kassidy has a drunken one-night stand with Kamille's fiancé which results in her becoming pregnant.

== Reception ==
Breia Brissey of Entertainment Weekly said of the novel "All in all, Dollhouse is just Kardashian camp packaged in a neat novel. It’s completely ridiculous, but entertaining nonetheless. And with the Kardashians I wouldn’t expect any less." Cristina Merrill of the International Business Times remarked that the novel had several disturbing scenes in it, including Kyle hooking up with her stepbrother, and Kamille's fiancé taking advantage of a drunken Kassidy. Merrill concluded about the novel "With the exception of the weirder scenes -- including the whole drunken sex and pregnancy storyline -- Dollhouse makes for a fun, entertaining read."
