= Rob & Chyna =

American reality television series

- Genre: Reality television
- Starring: Rob Kardashian; Blac Chyna
- Country of origin: United States
- Original language: English
- No. of seasons: 1
- No. of episodes: 7

Production
- Executive producers: Ryan Seacrest; Gil Goldschein; Jeff Jenkins; Farnaz Farjam; Ailee O'Neill; Kris Jenner; Blac Chyna; Rob Kardashian; Kim Kardashian; Walter Mosley Jr.
- Running time: 42 minutes
- Production companies: Bunim/Murray Productions; Ryan Seacrest Productions

Original release
- Network: E!
- Release: September 11 – December 18, 2016

Related
- Keeping Up with the Kardashians

Rob & Chyna is an American reality television series starring Rob Kardashian and Blac Chyna. The seven-episode series premiered on September 11, 2016, on the E! cable network.

== Production ==
The reality series was greenlit on June 1, 2016. Rob & Chyna follows the relationship of Rob Kardashian and Blac Chyna as they prepare to welcome their first child. Six hour-long episodes were ordered, excluding a television special featuring the birth of Kardashian and Chyna's newborn. The show premiered on September 11, 2016. Jeff Olde, an executive vice president of the network, explained the reasons of giving Kardashian and Chyna their own series:

Very few love stories have created as much pop culture buzz as Rob and Chyna's, and we are thrilled to see Rob in such a happy place. We are excited to share the next chapter in their relationship.

The series airs on E!, an American cable network which features mostly entertainment-related programming, and reality television series, including Keeping Up with the Kardashians, another series that both Rob Kardashian and Blac Chyna have been part of. The show is produced by Bunim/Murray Productions and Ryan Seacrest Productions, which also produce Keeping Up with the Kardashians.

== Fate ==
On December 14, 2016, E! renewed the series for a second season consisting of eight episodes that was expected to premiere in 2017. In July 2017, E! confirmed the series was put on hold, and not on their current schedule.

== Episodes ==
No.	Title	Original release date	U.S. viewers (millions)
1	"Are You Still Texting Bitches?"	September 11, 2016	2.04
The two begin to plan the future of being a married couple and raising a child, but due to suspicions Rob moves out of the home.
2	"Rob'ing the Cradle"	September 18, 2016	1.41
Rob continues to deal with his insecurities, and Scott Disick pays Rob a visit to help him overcome them. Later on a trip to Cannes, Chyna begins to feel self-doubt.
3	"Going Down to Chyna-town"	September 25, 2016	1.26
After Rob and Chyna attend Khloé's birthday, Rob begins to feel uncomfortable with being in the spotlight. The couple visits Washington, D.C. where Rob meet's Chyna's parents and is put under scrutiny. Later, Rob visits the strip club that gave Chyna her start.
4	"Bonding and Bondage"	October 2, 2016	1.37
Scott helps Rob reconnect with old friends whom he hasn't talked to in years. Later, Rob and Chyna plan a date night.
5	"Baby Bump in the Road"	October 9, 2016	1.40
Rob feels his life is on the right track; Chyna feels he's moving too fast. Later, Rob isolates himself from everyone.
6	"Paternity or Eternity"	October 16, 2016	1.20
With the Kardashian's urging, Rob relutantly agrees to therapy; Chyna pursues a paternity test for her unborn child.
7	"Rob & Chyna Baby Special"	December 18, 2016	0.95
Rob and Chyna struggle to agree on some of life's biggest decisions. Polar-opposite matriarchs Kris Jenner and Tokyo Toni come face to face. All leading up to the birth of Dream Kardashian!

== Reception ==
Dave Schilling, writing for The Guardian, panned the show by describing it as "painfully dull" and "astoundingly depressing". Bethonie Butler of The Washington Post noted its similarities to other shows featuring the Kardashian family, and said: "Aside from a comic book-esque visual effect that was used to transition scenes [...], Rob & Chyna is very much like the show that made the Kardashian family a household name".
