= Kourtney and Kim Take Miami =

American television series

- Also known as: Kourtney and Khloé Take Miami
- Genre: Reality
- Starring: Kourtney Kardashian; Kim Kardashian; Khloé Kardashian
- Opening theme: "I'm in Miami Trick" by LMFAO (seasons 1–2) "Showstopper" by Brandon & Leah (season 3)
- Country of origin: United States
- Original language: English
- No. of seasons: 3
- No. of episodes: 30

Production
- Executive producers: Farnaz Farjam; Gil Goldschein; Jeff Jenkins; Jonathan Murray; Kris Jenner; Melissa Bidwell; Russell Jay; Ryan Seacrest
- Camera setup: Multiple
- Running time: 22 minutes (Seasons 1–2); 42 minutes (Season 3)
- Production companies: Bunim/Murray Productions; Ryan Seacrest Productions

Original release
- Network: E!
- Release: August 16, 2009 – April 7, 2013

Related
- Keeping Up with the Kardashians; Kourtney and Kim Take New York; Khloé & Lamar

Kourtney and Kim Take Miami (titled Kourtney and Khloé Take Miami for its first two seasons) is an American reality television series. It premiered on E! on August 16, 2009, as the first Keeping Up with the Kardashians spin-off. The series originally followed sisters Kourtney and Khloé Kardashian as they opened a second D-A-S-H location in Miami Beach, Florida. From the third season, sister Kim Kardashian replaced Khloé, who had other work commitments. The third season began filming in October 2012, and premiered on January 20, 2013.

A web series spin-off was created during the third season, titled Lord Disick: Lifestyles of a Lord, the series showcases Disick as he informs viewers on how to live like a "king".

== Synopsis ==
For the first two seasons, Kourtney and Khloé Take Miami followed sisters Kourtney and Khloé Kardashian as they oversee the opening of a D-A-S-H store in Miami Beach, a follow-up to their original store in Calabasas. It also featured Khloé's radio show at Y100, 'Khloé After Dark', co-hosted by Terrence J, and the day-to-day lives of the duo. The third season sees Kim joining Kourtney as they find a new location for D-A-S-H Miami. This is the first Kardashian-related series to air after the birth of Kourtney and boyfriend Scott Disick's son Mason.

== Cast ==
=== Main ===
- Kourtney Kardashian
- Khloe Kardashian (main: seasons 1–2, recurring: season 3)
- Kim Kardashian (main: season 3, recurring: seasons 1–2)
- Scott Disick

=== Supporting ===
- Rob Kardashian
- Mason Disick
- Kanye West
- Jonathan Cheban
- Larsa Pippen
- Simon Huck
- Chapman Ducote
- Dani Campbell

== Episodes ==
=== Series overview ===
Season	Episodes	Originally released	
Season	Episodes	First released	Last released
1	8	August 15, 2009	October 4, 2009
2	10	June 13, 2010	August 15, 2010
3	12	January 20, 2013	April 7, 2013

=== Season 1 (2009) ===
No. overall	No. in season	Title	Original release date	U.S. viewers (millions)
1	1	"Paint the Town Dash"	August 15, 2009	2.7
Opening a new store in Miami Beach, Florida and performing her first radio show, "Khloé After Dark", proves too much for Khloé as her temper causes a fight between her and Kim that threatens the future of D-A-S-H.
2	2	"Sex, Drugs & Consequences"	August 23, 2009	N/A
Khloé's job is threatened when she pulls out drugs on her radio show "Khloé After Dark", while Kourtney accepts the affections of her new bisexual friend, Jackie.
3	3	"Hangover Helpers"	August 30, 2009	1.92
Khloé holds auditions at the boutique to find a date for Kourtney; Kim visits and gets pressured into getting drunk.
4	4	"Kourt Gone Wild"	September 6, 2009	1.47
Kourtney makes out with different men; Khloé gets approached to host a drag queen Khloé Kardashian look-alike contest.
5	5	"Seems Like Old Times"	September 13, 2009	N/A
Kourtney's ex-boyfriend Scott makes an unexpected return and she must decide whether or not to stay single. Meanwhile, Erica, one of the D-A-S-H employees, may get fired.
6	6	"All Men Are Dogs"	September 20, 2009	N/A
Khloé, previously having boyfriend trouble, projects that onto a possible future relationship with Omarion. Meanwhile, Kourtney helps Carrie, a D-A-S-H employee, jump start her modeling career.
7	7	"Land of the Lost"	September 27, 2009	N/A
Kourtney, Khloé, and Jonathan get lost in the Everglades while on a trip to Tampa. Kourtney discovers she is pregnant.
8	8	"Executive Decisions"	October 4, 2009	2.6
When it's confirmed that Kourtney is pregnant with Scott's baby, she has some hard decisions to make. She's not sure she's ready to be a mother.

=== Season 2 (2010) ===
No. overall	No. in season	Title	Original release date	U.S. viewers (millions)
9	1	"Back in Miami"	June 13, 2010	2.60
Kourtney and Khloe, with Scott and Mason, return to Miami. The girls help get D-A-S-H back on track, and promote the store by doing a naked/painted photo shoot with two of their employees. At the photo shoot, Kourtney gets frustrated with hungover Khloé. After being late for her radio show, Khloé After Dark, she decides to get her priorities straight. Meanwhile, Scott looks into fixing up a nightclub.
10	2	"Wax On Wax Off"	June 20, 2010	2.63
Khloé wants to look good for Lamar when he comes to Miami for a visit, so Kourtney gives her a bikini wax. Kourtney decides to go out with her friends, and her drinking from the night takes a toll on her day at the zoo with Mason and Scott the following day.
11	3	"Scotts-o-phrenia"	June 27, 2010	2.27
Khloé becomes fascinated by sociopaths and serial killers and wants to interview one on her radio show. Kourtney becomes angry with Scott after he goes against her wishes and takes the D-A-S-H girls out to his club for the opening. Scott becomes extremely angry when Khloé insists he is a sociopath.
12	4	"Jealousy Makes the Heart Grow Fonder"	July 5, 2010	2.34
Kourtney uses an old flame to make Scott jealous; Rob and Lamar's close relationship begins to annoy Khloe.
13	5	"Picture Perfect"	July 11, 2010	2.26
Kourtney has her first photo shoot with Life and Style since having Mason. Meanwhile, Khloe handles things at the store while Kourtney works out for the week, which leads to Khloe taking the girls out to a nightclub. Kourtney and Khloe's relationship is tested and could be changed forever.
14	6	"Sisterly Love"	July 18, 2010	2.34
Khloe leaves Miami after an argument with Kourtney. Kim comes to the rescue and hopes for them to bond with each other, though it turns out to be the complete opposite. A D-A-S-H employee faces a medical scare.
15	7	"Kourtney's Denial"	July 25, 2010	2.68
While in Miami, Kim helps Kourtney with the store and taking care of Mason. Kourtney refuses to accept that Scott has a drinking problem, which angers Kim.
16	8	"Man in the Mirror"	August 1, 2010	3.45
After a violent alcohol-fueled tirade, Scott ends up in the hospital. Kim helps persuade Kourtney to not see Scott until he gets professional help with his drinking problem.
17	9	"It's My Life"	August 8, 2010	2.91
Kris visits and tells Scott to stay away from Kourtney; Khloe has to fire someone. Guest Stars: Kris Jenner, Kendall Jenner, Kylie Jenner
18	10	"Broken Family"	August 15, 2010	3.65
With a week left in Miami, Khloe is nervous that Kourtney will stay in Miami with Scott.

=== Season 3 (2013) ===
No. overall	No. in season	Title	Original release date	U.S. viewers (millions)
19	1	"Welcome Back to Miami"	January 20, 2013	2.16
Kourtney arrives in Miami without Scott; Kim is focused on being a good mom to her new kitten.
20	2	"Secrets"	January 21, 2013	1.54
Kim's fertility is comparable to a fifty-year-old and she begins to take her frustrations out on Kourtney; meanwhile, Scott plans to race cars with his new best friend, much to Kourtney's dismay.
21	3	"Lez-B-Honest"	January 27, 2013	2.07
Scott learns about the vibrant lesbian community in Miami, while Kim discovers the benefits of breast milk in treating psoriasis
22	4	"Dragon Me Down"	February 10, 2013	1.31
Kim invites her entire family to Miami to compete in a dragon-boat race. At the same time, Kourtney suspects her sister-in-law is pregnant, while Scott has trouble dealing with Bruce's competitive nature
23	5	"2 Klose 4 Komfort"	February 17, 2013	1.48
Kourtney would like to move out of the hotel and into a house, but she and Kim have difficulty finding the time to search for a new residence. At the same time, Scott acts overly friendly with Khloé; and the sisters help Rob cope with a bad breakup.
24	6	"Bitch Slapped"	February 18, 2013	1.35
Jonathan takes Kim's side during an argument with Kourtney, which sets the older sister off. Meanwhile, Kim learns she has a life-changing allergy; and Khloé finds herself in a strange predicament because of her love of Cuban coffee
25	7	"We'll Always Have Paris"	March 3, 2013	1.42
Kim attempts to fix Simon and Jonathan's friendship. Kourtney tries to reignite her and Scott's relationship but goes unnoticed.
26	8	"Miami VICEs"	March 10, 2013	1.41
Kim takes her love of detective work to another level; Scott's eye problems create a new fashion accessory; Kourtney's weight gain starts to get to her.
27	9	"Lord Disick in the House"	March 17, 2013	1.38
Khloe gets a hosting job; Scott wants to give Lord Disick a royal introduction; Kim and Kourtney get competitive.
28	10	"See Ya Later, Alligator"	March 24, 2013	1.49
Kim goes on a shopping spree to update her closet after she's put on a "Worst Dressed List". Scott goes down to alligator country and learns about a new side of Florida. Kourtney reveals her post-baby body for a photo shoot.
29	11	"Babies, Lies, and Alibis: Part One"	March 31, 2013	1.56
Kourtney thinks about being a surrogate mother for Khloé. Kim works with a private investigator to watch Scott, who she thinks is acting suspicious.
30	12	"Babies, Lies, and Alibis: Part Two"	April 7, 2013	2.56
The family becomes upset when they discover that Kim hired a private investigator to follow Scott but the mood later changes when Kim reveals her pregnancy to everyone's surprise.

== Ratings ==
The first-season premiere was viewed by 2.8 million viewers — but only three weeks later lost almost half of its premiere audience. However, ratings recovered as the season finale was viewed by 2.6 million viewers. The season averaged 1.89 million viewers. The second-season premiere was viewed by 2.607 million viewers and has had a successful run to-date with the lowest rated episode being viewed by only 13.04% less than the premiere with 2.267 million in contrast to the previous season where ratings dropped to 1.475 million. The season finale reached an all-time high with 3.656 million viewers. The season averaged 2.717 million viewers.
