= Dash (boutique) =

Defunct fashion chain

- Type: Fashion boutique
- Industry: Fashion
- Founded: June 2006; 20 years ago Calabasas, California, United States
- Founders: Kourtney Kardashian; Kim Kardashian; Khloé Kardashian
- Defunct: 2018; 8 years ago
- Headquarters: West Hollywood, California, United States
- Number of locations: 2 stores (2018)
- Revenue: $5 million
- Owners: Kim Kardashian; Kourtney Kardashian; Khloé Kardashian
- Website: Archived official website at the Wayback Machine (archive index)

Dash was a boutique clothing and accessory chain founded in 2006 by sisters Kim Kardashian, Kourtney Kardashian, and Khloé Kardashian. The boutique had three locations; West Hollywood, New York City, and Miami. In December 2016, the New York City location was closed. In April 2018, the two remaining locations closed, and the company shut down after 11 years of operation.

== Stores ==
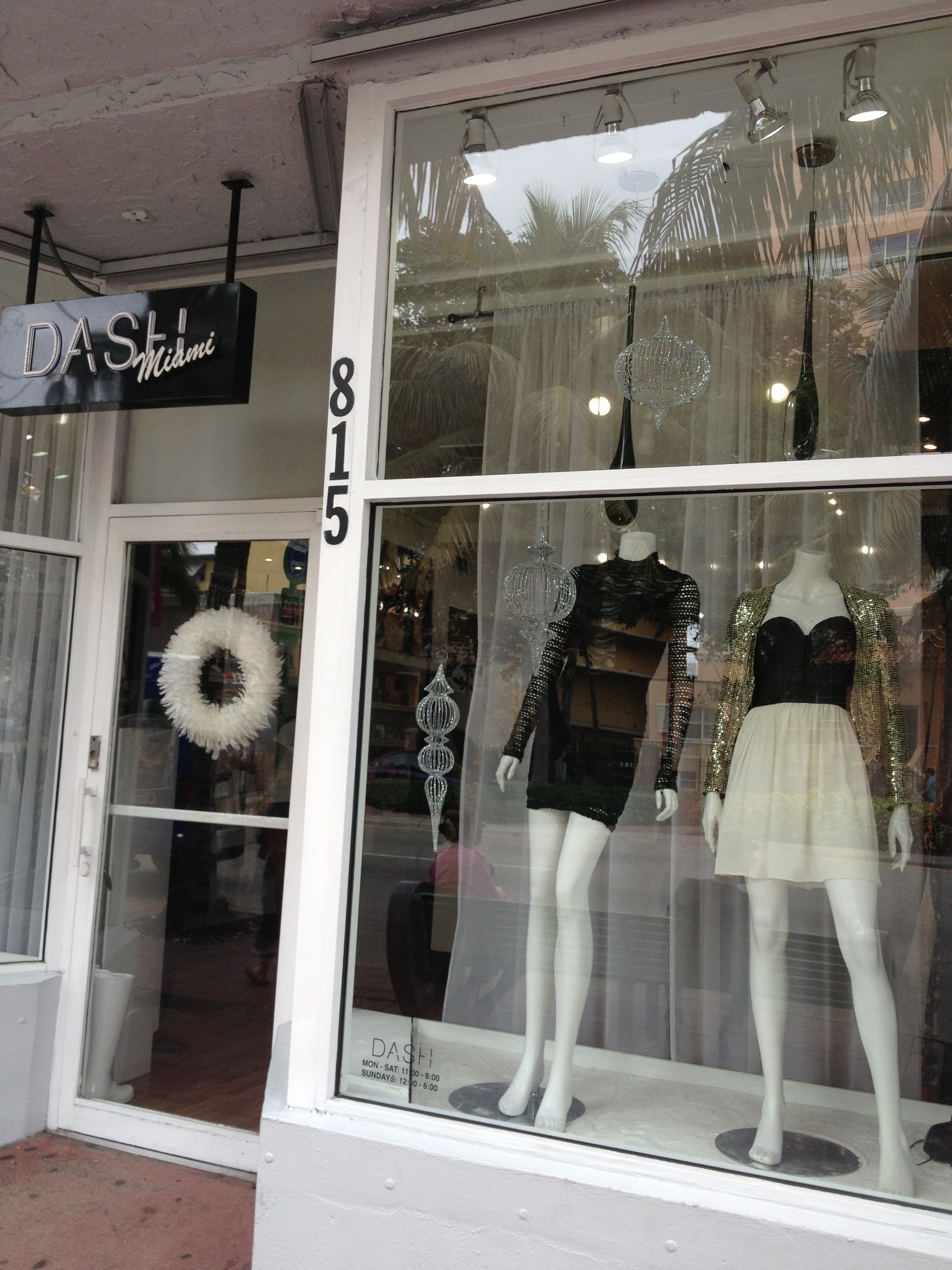
Dash boutique in Miami Beach

The first Dash boutique was opened in Calabasas, California in 2006. The original store was subsequently relocated to West Hollywood in 2012. The retail stores have appeared on reality television series about the Kardashian family, Keeping Up with the Kardashians, which premiered in 2007 on the E! cable network. Kim Kardashian has disclosed that she initially wanted Keeping Up with the Kardashians to focus more on their stores in order to bring people's attention and later said that she "didn't think it would turn into what it turned into." The second store was opened in Miami Beach, Florida on May 20, 2009.

The third store was opened on November 3, 2010, in the SoHo district of Manhattan, New York City. In November 2010, TMZ reported that the store maintained to bring in an average gross of $50,000 every day since its opening date; on Black Friday the store brought in over $100,000. The store closed in December 2016 due to high rent.

In the summer of 2014, the sisters opened a pop-up retail store in Southampton, New York, which was featured in Kourtney and Khloé Take The Hamptons, a spin-off of Keeping up with the Kardashians.

== Closure ==
In April 2018, Kim Kardashian announced the closure of all Dash stores via a statement on her website. She furthermore explained the reasoning behind the closure stating that she and her sisters have all grown individually and have their own brands to focus on, along with being mothers.

== Television series ==
The television series entitled Dash Dolls premiered on the E! cable network, on September 20, 2015. The reality series "follow[s] the lives of the Kardashian sisters' Dash employees as they navigate life in Hollywood while representing the Kardashian store."
