= Khloé & Lamar =

- Genre: Reality
- Starring: Khloé Kardashian; Lamar Odom
- Country of origin: United States
- Original language: English
- No. of seasons: 2
- No. of episodes: 20

Production
- Executive producers: Farnaz Farjam; Gil Goldschein; Jeff Jenkins; Maybelle; Jonathan Murray; Khloé Kardashian; Kris Jenner; Ryan Seacrest
- Camera setup: Single
- Running time: 20 to 23 minutes
- Production companies: Bunim/Murray Productions; Ryan Seacrest Productions

Original release
- Network: E!
- Release: April 10, 2011 – May 13, 2012

Related
- Keeping Up with the Kardashians; K and K Take; Rob & Chyna

Khloé & Lamar is an American reality television series that debuted on E! on April 10, 2011. The series is the third spin-off of the show Keeping Up with the Kardashians and features reality star Khloé Kardashian and her then-husband, basketball player Lamar Odom. The series returned for its second and final season on February 19, 2012.

== Cast ==
- Khloé Kardashian
- Lamar Odom, Khloé's husband
- Rob Kardashian, Khloé's younger brother
- Malika Haqq, Khloé's best friend

=== Supporting ===
- Jamie Sangouthai, Lamar's best friend
- Joseph "Joe" Odom, Lamar's Father
- Kourtney Kardashian, Khloé's oldest sister
- Kim Kardashian, Khloé's older sister
- Kris Jenner, Khloé's mother

== Episodes ==
=== Series overview ===
Season	Episodes	Originally released	
Season	Episodes	First released	Last released
1	8	April 10, 2011	May 30, 2011
2	12	February 19, 2012	May 13, 2012

=== Season 1 (2011) ===
No. overall	No. in season	Title	Original release date	U.S. viewers (millions)
1	1	"The Father-In-Law"	April 10, 2011	2.54
In the opener, Khloé pushes Lamar to reconnect with his estranged father, and Lamar learns whether he made the NBA All-Star team. Khloé makes a shocking discovery.
2	2	"Codependent No More"	April 17, 2011	2.20
Khloé has to take matters into her own hands when it comes to Jamie; Rob starts managing BG5.
3	3	"Lamar is a Dirty Boy"	April 24, 2011	1.59
Khloé gives Lamar and Rob a taste of their own messiness; Khloé takes a look at her insecurities when she is criticized for her weight gain.
4	4	"The Break-Up"	May 1, 2011	1.93
Malika thinks that she is caught in Khloé's shadow; Rob is jealous of Lamar and Jamie's bond.
5	5	"Unbreakable"	May 8, 2011	1.76
The couple discusses creating a unisex fragrance; Malika takes another look at her relationship with Rob.
6	6	"The Return of Joe Odom"	May 15, 2011	1.69
Lamar tries to reconnect with his estranged father; Malika's family visit and wear out their welcome at the Odom house.
7	7	"Jamie 9-1-1"	May 22, 2011	1.96
Lamar fires Jamie from Rich Soil; Malika gets jealous when Rob hangs out with another girl.
8	8	"Baby Blues"	May 30, 2011	1.70
Khloé goes to the doctor to see why she isn't conceiving; Rob finds out he got a girl pregnant

=== Season 2 (2012) ===
No. overall	No. in season	Title	Original release date	U.S. viewers (millions)
9	1	"A Fine Bromance"	February 19, 2012	2.57
Rob finally decides to move out, but it causes some controversy between him and Lamar. Meanwhile, Khloé looks at how to spice up her and Lamar's love life.
10	2	"Rock-a-Bye Lam Lam"	February 20, 2012	1.92
Lamar has trouble getting to sleep and Khloé has to take drastic measures when his night life begins to affect her. Malika breaks her own rules when she dates a man going through a divorce who also has children. She later begins to feel guilty and questions their relationship.
11	3	"Cuffed"	March 4, 2012	2.11
Lamar thinks Khloé treats him like a baby and sets out to change her behavior; Rob tries to carve out a life for himself that is outside of his sisters' shadows
12	4	"No Turkey for Khloé?"	March 11, 2012	1.81
Lamar gets an offer to play basketball in Turkey, but Khloé isn't sure it's a good idea. Meanwhile, Jamie tries to use his connections to land an acting job.
13	5	"PTSD"	March 18, 2012	1.76
Lamar learns more about himself and his father when his dad opens up about his time in Vietnam. Meanwhile, Malika wants to get breast implants, but Khloé fears she wants them for the wrong reason.
14	6	"The Trade"	April 1, 2012	1.53
Khloé flies to New York for an appearance; Lamar learns he is being traded by the Lakers.
15	7	"Alone Star State of Mind"	April 8, 2012	1.79
Lamar struggles to adjust to life in Dallas, and he takes his frustrations out on Khloé.
16	8	"Under Pressure"	April 15, 2012	1.71
Lamar's mental game is affected when he feels pressure to perform well on the basketball court. Meanwhile, Khloé deals with the pressure of being constantly asked when she is going to get pregnant.
17	9	"Lamar vs. Lakers"	April 22, 2012	1.69
Lamar faces his first game back in Los Angeles against the Lakers after joining the Mavericks, but is surprised to see the support he receives from his family and his former team.
18	10	"Family Reunion"	April 29, 2012	1.70
Rob comes to visit Khloe and Lamar in Dallas and decides to stay longer to support them. Khloe is upset when her mother, Kris Jenner, tries to befriend Mark Cuban, owner of the Dallas Mavericks.
19	11	"Compulsive Behavior"	May 6, 2012	1.55
Rob’s OCD gets out of hand in Dallas after his living situation in LA becomes compromised. Malika is jealous of Khloé’s friendship with fellow NBA wife, Porschla Kidd.
20	12	"The Truth Will Set You Free"	May 13, 2012	1.83
After learning of her mother's affair, Khloe fears she is not a true Kardashian.
