= Kourtney and Kim Take New York =

American reality television series

- Genre: Reality
- Starring: Kourtney Kardashian; Kim Kardashian
- Opening theme: "I'm in New York Trick" by LMFAO
- Country of origin: United States
- Original language: English
- No. of seasons: 2
- No. of episodes: 20

Production
- Executive producers: Ryan Seacrest; Jonathan Murray; Jeff Jenkins; Gil Goldschein; Russell Jay; Melissa Bidwell; Kris Jenner
- Camera setup: Single
- Running time: 23 minutes (Season 1); 42 minutes (Season 2)
- Production companies: Bunim/Murray Productions; Ryan Seacrest Productions

Original release
- Network: E!
- Release: January 23, 2011 – January 29, 2012

Related
- Kourtney and Kim Take Miami; Keeping Up with the Kardashians

Kourtney and Kim Take New York is an American reality television series that premiered January 23, 2011, on E! and ran for two seasons. The series followed sisters Kim Kardashian and Kourtney Kardashian as they opened a Dash boutique in New York City. Kourtney and Kim Take New York is the second spin-off of Keeping Up with the Kardashians.

== Premise ==
Kourtney and Kim Take New York follows Kourtney Kardashian as she leaves Los Angeles once more, this time followed by younger sister Kim, to open a third Dash retail store, in New York City. Kim and Kourtney started shooting a second season in August 2011.

On October 26, 2011, E! announced that the series has been renewed for a second season. The second season was filmed following Kim's marriage to basketball player Kris Humphries that month. However, the season was reworked to focus more on the couple's troubles after Kardashian filed for divorce in October 2011. The second season premiered on November 27, 2011, and the premiere episode acquired 3.1 million viewers.

== Cast ==
=== Main ===
- Kourtney Kardashian
- Kim Kardashian
- Scott Disick

=== Supporting ===
- Khloé Kardashian (seasons 1–2)
- Kris Jenner (seasons 1–2)
- Mason Disick (season 2), Kourtney and Scott's son.
- Kris Humphries (season 2), Kim's then husband, now ex-husband.
- Jonathan Cheban (season 2), Kim's best friend
- Kanye West

== Episodes ==
=== Series overview ===
Season	Episodes	Originally released	
Season	Episodes	First released	Last released
1	10	January 23, 2011	April 3, 2011
2	10	November 27, 2011	January 29, 2012

=== Season 1 (2011) ===
No. overall	No. in season	Title	Original release date	U.S. viewers (millions)
1	1	"Life in the Big City"	January 23, 2011	3.01
Kourtney and Kim arrive in New York City in hopes of achieving success with the opening of their new store, DASH New York. Kourtney considers asking her boyfriend Scott to move into her hotel suite, which annoys Kim who had planned on spending most of her time with her sister. Also, newly single Kim tries to mingle with eligible New Yorkers but when the media sees Kim out on innocent dates, they twist the story into something that it's not, upsetting Kim.
2	2	"Start Spreading the News"	January 30, 2011	3.17
Scott gets into a fight at New York's Juliet supper club with a man after his girlfriend started arguing with Kim, resulting in Kourtney not speaking to Scott, whom she believes started the fight. Meanwhile, Khloè comes to New York City to visit Kourtney and Kim.
3	3	"Sexy in the City"	February 13, 2011	1.55
Kourtney fears Kim is heading too fast toward love with her former bodyguard. Scott makes a pricy purchase that infuriates Kourtney.
4	4	"Diva Las Vegas"	February 20, 2011	2.18
Kim and Kourtney head to Las Vegas for a birthday and Kourtney forces her to do something wild before she turns 30. Meanwhile, Scott wonders if he can maintain his sobriety.
5	5	"Down and Out in New York City"	February 21, 2011	N/A
Kim is devastated to learn Shengo's visa is expiring and wonders if there's a way to keep her Aussie in the country. Meanwhile, Kourtney and Scott struggle to find privacy.
6	6	"Dream a Little Dream"	March 6, 2011	1.99
Kim receives an unexpected offer to record a single with music superstar The Dream but her nerves force her to reconsider. Meanwhile, Scott purchases a walking stick that annoys Kourtney.
7	7	"Straight Expectations"	March 13, 2011	2.07
Kourtney tries to prove to Kim that her new shopping buddy isn't who she thinks he is. Scott and Kourtney have an explosive argument leading them to question if they can live together.
8	8	"A Dash of Respect"	March 20, 2011	2.07
Khloé returns to NY for DASH's grand opening, leaving Kim hurt and jealous when Kourtney and Khloe bond. Scott lands a magazine cover and hires an assistant to help with his busy schedule but he may act a little too bossy.
9	9	"In a New York Minute"	March 27, 2011	2.10
Kourtney gets the opportunity of a lifetime when she's offered a role on One Life to Live. Kim must decide between attending Scott's work event or obeying her mother's commands.
10	10	"One Last Dash"	April 3, 2011	2.07
Kim's torn about leaving NYC and debates making a drastic cross-country move. Kourtney and Scott celebrate their relationship with a night out and Scott considers popping the question.

=== Season 2 (2011–12) ===
No. overall	No. in season	Title	Original release date	U.S. viewers (millions)
11	1	"The Honeymoon Is Over"	November 27, 2011	3.19
The second season begins with newlyweds Kim and Kris living with Kourtney and Scott, but things don't go exactly as planned. Kourtney and Scott continue to clash and Scott eventually goes to his friend, Jonathan Cheban, to get some space. Kris also acts up during an event with Kim because it interferes with his training schedule. Kris also struggles dealing with Kourtney and Mason, as well as living with Kim. After he walks in on Kourtney, Kim and some friends taking a naked yoga class inside their apartment, Kris gets furious at Kim after seeing a naked yoga instructor. He then decides to go to Minnesota and train in his element.
12	2	"Go Get Your Man"	December 4, 2011	2.99
Khloe visits the city to help Kim and Kourtney deal with their man problems. She sends Kim to Minnesota to persuade Kris to come back to New York, but she lashes out at Khloe over waking her up an hour earlier than she should have and ends up hurting Khloe's feelings. Kourtney, Khloe and Mason go to Scott's parents' house in the Hamptons, where Kourtney continues to wreak havoc with her uber-cleanliness and she offends Scott's mother when she throws away vintage items. Kourtney and Scott eventually make up and Kris finally agrees to come back to New York with Kim after she continuously nags him to compromise.
13	3	"Three's a Crowd"	December 11, 2011	3.21
Kim decides to get off of birth control and decides to ask Kris Humphries if it's time to have a baby. Meanwhile, Kris Jenner visits the girls in NYC and hosts the Today show with Scott. However, after serious consideration, Kim decides not to have a baby at this moment despite Kris Humpries wanting to start a family after talking to Scott.
14	4	"True Colors"	December 18, 2011	2.84
Kim feels betrayed when Jonathan writes a tell all book about her which results in a fight. But after reading an unofficial copy of the book, she realizes that it wasn't a tell all book, but instead a book about how to make it as a "it girl" and referring to Kim as a successful and extraordinary person. Meanwhile Kris throws a house party behind Kim and Kourtney's back while they are in California promoting their Kardashian Kollection with Khloé Kardashian. Being against it from the start, Scott takes the blame for the party when the girls find out after seeing pictures taken from the party. Meanwhile, Scott tries to get in touch with his Jewish roots after realizing that Kourtney wants to raise Mason as a Christian. Despite Kourtney's doubts that Scott is taking his religion seriously, she finally agrees to support him.
15	5	"Questionable Actions"	January 1, 2012	3.19
Kris Humphries ruffles feathers with Kim & Jonathan when he questions Jonathan's sexuality. Kourtney takes a surprising interest in coupons and Scott makes his biggest impulse buy yet, but takes it way too far.
16	6	"Cat's Away Mice Play"	January 8, 2012	3.27
Kourtney, Kim and Mason visit Connecticut while Kris and Scott sneak to Toronto for Kris' appearance at a party. This makes Kim unhappy when she finds out on the internet and wonders if she can trust him.
17	7	"Kim Takes Dubai"	January 8, 2012	3.30
Kim travels to Dubai with her mom and realizes she's having a great time without her husband. Back in New York, Kourtney and Khloe play a prank on Kris Humphries, who ends up finding it annoying.
18	8	"Family Therapy"	January 15, 2012	3.27
Kim takes her frustration with her husband out on her sisters and Scott. Khloe tries to help Kourtney and Scott get back in the same bedroom, and Kim eventually apologizes to Khloe about the email she sent her.
19	9	"Voices from Beyond"	January 22, 2012	2.94
Kim sees a medium to communicate with her late father. Kris' sister arrives in town.
20	10	"Goodbye, New York"	January 29, 2012	4.47
Kim comes to a conclusion about her marriage as the gang prepares to leave New York City.
