= Sophia Hutchins =

American socialite (1996–2025)

- Born: April 1, 1996; Bellevue, Washington, U.S.
- Died: July 2, 2025 (aged 29); Malibu, California, U.S.
- Education: Pepperdine University (B.S.)
- Occupations: Socialite, media personality, businesswoman, charity executive, model
- Years active: 2015–2025
- Organization: Caitlyn Jenner Foundation
- Known for: Caitlyn Jenner's manager
- Television: I Am Cait (2015–2016)
- Political party: Republican

Sophia Hutchins (April 1, 1996 – July 2, 2025) was an American socialite, media personality, businesswoman, charity executive and model. She was best known as the manager of Caitlyn Jenner, the chief executive officer and director of the Caitlyn Jenner Foundation, and the founder CEO of the sunscreen company LUMASOL.

== Early life and education ==
Hutchins was born in Bellevue, Washington on April 1, 1996. Her parents divorced when she was young. She was raised Roman Catholic in Washington by her single mom before moving to live with her maternal grandparents in Seattle. She attended Auburn Riverside High School, a public secondary school, in Auburn, before transferring to Eastside Catholic School, a private secondary school, in Sammamish.

In 2016, Hutchins came out as a transgender woman and received gender-affirming surgery. She cited Caitlyn Jenner as her inspiration for coming out as a freshman at Pepperdine University, which she attended on an academic scholarship. She graduated in 2019, with her Bachelor of Science degree in economics and finance. While attending Pepperdine, she became the first openly transgender person to serve in the student government and was the first openly transgender person to graduate from Pepperdine.

== Career ==
Hutchins first met Jenner in December 2015, at a mutual friend's Christmas party in the Hollywood Hills, before the two ran into each other at a MAC Cosmetics photoshoot in January 2016. They were officially introduced by their mutual hairdresser and makeup artist. Hutchins rose to prominence as a supporting cast member on the E! documentary series I Am Cait (2015–2016). She appeared alongside many notable members from the trans community: Jennifer Finney Boylan, Candis Cayne, Chandi Moore, Zackary Drucker, Kate Bornstein, Jen Richards, and Ella Giselle. She was the onetime chief executive officer and director of the Caitlyn Jenner Foundation, an organization that promoted LGBTQ equality and provided grants to organizations that help transgender people. She worked as Jenner's manager, taking over the vacant position from Jenner's ex-wife, Kris.

Hutchins was an influencer, appearing on two episodes of the ITV talk show Loose Women (UK) in September 2018 and November 2019, respectively, and on an episode of the ITV breakfast television programme Lorraine (UK), also in November 2019. Her television appearances were in connection to promoting Jenner, who was appearing as a contestant on the nineteenth season of the ITV survival reality television series I'm a Celebrity...Get Me Out of Here! (UK); Jenner was eliminated from the competition on December 6, leaving in sixth place. Hutchins appeared alongside Jenner on the finale "Coming Out 2019" episode.

Hutchins was the founder CEO of LUMASOL, a company that made sunscreen mist. In September 2019, she was profiled by Forbes about LUMASOL. She launched her company in May 2020, owned by Luma Suncare, Inc., trademarking "LUMASOL" in May 2019. Her company was originally set to launch in April 2020, however, the launch was postponed in response to the COVID-19 pandemic. She cited Jenner's battle with basal-cell carcinoma, the most common type of skin cancer, as her inspiration behind her company.

Hutchins made guest appearances on the eighteenth season of the E! reality television series Keeping Up with the Kardashians. The season aired weekly between March 26 and April 30, 2020. She made guest appearances on the twentieth season, which aired weekly between March 18 and June 20, 2021.

Hutchins appeared as a model in an advertising campaign for Kim Kardashian's shapewear and clothing brand SKIMS in August 2020. She modeled a $78 nude bodysuit.

Hutchins made a failed attempt at becoming a main cast member on the Bravo reality television series The Real Housewives of Beverly Hills in 2020. That October, Andy Cohen, an executive producer of The Real Housewives franchise, denied the rumors of her casting.

== Controversies ==
In October 2020, Hutchins and LUMASOL were sued by a former employee, Rosa Chu. Chu alleged that Hutchins fired her after she had advocated that the marketing team should work from home amid the COVID-19 pandemic. Chu also alleged that Hutchins would often make racially insensitive remarks. In November 2021, the lawsuit was settled.

In June 2024, Hutchins publicly attacked the LGBTQ community and made racially insensitive remarks in a social media rant. Jenner later defended her.

In November 2024, Hutchins and Jenner were sued by the British investor Lee Greenfield in relations to their $JENNER cryptocurrency. In May 2025, a federal judge dismissed the lawsuit ruling that the plaintiffs failed to establish jurisdiction in the United States.

In April 2026, Caitlyn Jenner stated that Hutchins owed her over $439,000 at the time of her death; Jenner filed a claim to the Hutchins Estate for this money.

== Politics ==
Hutchins—like Jenner—was a member of the Republican Party. Hutchins publicly endorsed Donald Trump during the 2024 U.S. presidential elections. She served as a surrogate in Trump's 2024 presidential campaign, where she made several television appearances in support of Trump. Hutchins and Jenner attended the election night watch party at the Mar-a-Lago in Palm Beach on November 5, 2024.

== Personal life ==
Hutchins lived with Jenner at Jenner's home in Malibu, California, which they had to evacuate amid the 2018 Woolsey Fire. She had previously been living in an apartment in Beverly Hills, California. In November 2019, she was interviewed by the English journalist and television host Piers Morgan on the ITV breakfast television programme Good Morning Britain. She later posted on social media that Morgan had asked her inappropriate questions regarding her relationship with Jenner. She had to respond, on numerous occasions, to various tabloids that ran articles falsely claiming she and Jenner were either dating or engaged. She was a close family friend of the Kardashian family, particularly with Kourtney, Kim, Khloé, Rob, Kendall, and Kylie. She maintained civility between Jenner and Jenner's ex-wife, Kris. She often appeared on Jenner's YouTube channel.

Hutchins told Lauryn Evarts Bosstick and Michael Bosstick, while appearing on The Skinny Confidential Him & Her Show in February 2021, that she dated men. In December 2019, she told E! Online that she was in a relationship, but did not reveal the identity of the man.

== Death ==
Hutchins died in an ATV accident near her home in Malibu, California, on July 2, 2025, at the age of 29. According to TMZ, she was driving a blue 2013 Polaris-manufactured ATV on Decker Canyon Road when it struck the rear of a moving vehicle. The impact caused the ATV to leave the road and fall approximately 350 feet (107 m) into a ravine. Emergency responders pronounced her dead at the scene; Jenner was present. The two women in the other vehicle, a grey 2016 Mazda 6, were not injured. Sergeant Eduardo Saucedo of the Los Angeles County Sheriff's Department, based at the Malibu/Lost Hills Sheriff Station, told the Daily Mail: "It looks like she may have been speeding and rear-ended the other car, the other party, and then that caused her to veer to the right and go off the cliff. It doesn't seem like she was following them. I think she just she came up on them and then hit the car. So it looked like she tried to maneuver to go around it, but she was going too fast and just ended up clipping the rear end of that Mazda, causing her to veer off and go off the cliff there."

On July 4, Jenner was spotted by the Daily Mail while visiting Starbucks on Pacific Coast Highway in Malibu. Jenner briefly told the outlet that she was going through "tough times" but declined to talk about recent events. In the aftermath of Hutchins's death, Jenner was seen spending time with Hutchins's mother and was later described as being "numb with shock."

== Legacy ==
Hutchins was mentioned in Jenner's 2017 memoir The Secrets of My Life, published by Grand Central Publishing.

== Filmography ==
Year	Title	Notes	Ref.
2015–2016	I Am Cait	Supporting cast member	
2018–2019	Loose Women	2 episodes	
2019	Lorraine	20 November 2019 episode	
2019	Good Morning Britain	27 November 2019 episode	
2019	I'm a Celebrity...Get Me Out of Here!	Episode: "Coming Out 2019"	
2020–2021	Keeping Up with the Kardashians	Guest appearances	
2025	Livin' with Lucy	1 Episode	

== Podcast appearances ==
Date	Title	Host(s)	Notes	Ref.
October 3, 2018	Hidden Truth Show	Jim Breslo	Episode: "S E14: TRANS: Caitlyn Jenner's Partner Sophia Hutchins Shares Her Transition Story in First Ever Sit Down Interview"	
October 9, 2018	Hidden Truth Show	Jim Breslo	Episode: "S E15: TRANS: Caitlyn Jenner's Partner Sophia Hutchins Shares Her Transition Story in First Ever Sit Down Interview Pt. II"	
February 4, 2020	LevelUpDaily	D'Andre Evans	Episode: "Ep: 101 Sophia Hutchins - How To Raise Money For Your Startup"	
May 14, 2020	Juicy Scoop	Heather McDonald	Episode: "FULL INTERVIEW Sophia Hutchins: The Truth About Caitlyn Jenner, Her Dating Life, and Being a CEO"	
July 27, 2020	American Influencer Real Talk	Josh Skinner	Episode: "Sophia Hutchins"	
September 28, 2020	Entreprenista	Stephanie Cartin and Courtney Spritzer	Episode: "Launching a Skincare Startup Amid a Pandemic with Sophia Hutchins"	
October 29, 2020	Behind the Velvet Rope	David Yontef	Episode: "Sophia Hutchins (on Caitlyn Jenner, The Kardashians, RHOBH & her Lumasol Empire!)"	
February 18, 2021	The Skinny Confidential Him & Her Show	Lauryn Evarts Bosstick and Michael Bosstick	Episode: "How To Bootstrap A Business, Raise Capital, & Find The Right People To Work With Ft. Sophia Hutchins Founder Of Lumasol"	
August 27, 2021	The Bottled Blonde	Kristina McInnis	Episode: "Hearing 'No' is not a failure with Sophia Hutchins"	

On July 6, 2025, Hutchins's episode of The Skinny Confidential Him & Her Show with Lauryn Evarts Bosstick and Michael Bosstick was removed from all platforms.

== See also ==
- History of transgender people in the United States
