= Ella Giselle =

American television personality

Ella Giselle is an American television personality, actress, and transgender rights activist. She is known for being a castmember of the American reality documentary television series I Am Cait in 2016.

== Biography ==
Giselle is a native of Southern California. She graduated from high school in 2015. Giselle came out as a transgender woman while in high school, and transitioned between her junior and senior years.

Giselle was a close family friend of the Jenner and Kardashian families. Her father dated Kris Jenner's assistant, Rona Kamihira, when Giselle was a child. Kamihira notified Caitlyn Jenner about Giselle's transition, and Jenner met with Giselle to pitch the idea of joining the cast of the reality television documentary series I Am Cait. Giselle joined the show for its second season in 2016. She spoke about transgender rights and issues at Graceland University and other institutions around the United States with other castmembers, including Jennifer Finney Boylan, Kate Bornstein, Candis Cayne, Chandi Moore.

In 2016, Giselle portrayed Madonna in Tegan and Sara's music video for the song Faint of Heart.
