= Takin' It Back =

2022 studio album by Meghan Trainor

Studio album by Meghan Trainor
- Released: October 21, 2022
- Genres: Doo-wop; bubblegum pop
- Length: 45:36
- Label: Epic
- Producers: Meghan Trainor; Federico Vindver; Justin Trainor; Gian Stone; Teddy Geiger; Afterhrs; Rafa; Kid Harpoon; Tyler Johnson

Meghan Trainor chronology
A Very Trainor Christmas (2020)	Takin' It Back (2022)	Timeless (2024)

Singles from Takin' It Back
- 1. "Bad for Me" Released: June 24, 2022; 2. "Made You Look" Released: October 31, 2022

Singles from Takin' It Back (Deluxe)
- 1. "Mother" Released: March 27, 2023

Takin' It Back is the fifth studio album by the American singer-songwriter Meghan Trainor. Epic Records released the album on October 21, 2022. Trainor worked with producers including Federico Vindver, Gian Stone, Kid Harpoon, and Tyler Johnson. Featured artists include Scott Hoying, Teddy Swims, Theron Theron, Natti Natasha, and Arturo Sandoval. It is a doo-wop and bubblegum pop album, which Trainor conceived as a return to the sound of her debut studio album, Title (2015), after its title track went viral on TikTok. Takin' It Back's lyrical themes revolve around motherhood and self-acceptance.

Trainor promoted Takin' It Back with public appearances and televised performances on programs such as Today and The Tonight Show Starring Jimmy Fallon. The album was supported by the release of two singles, "Bad for Me" and "Made You Look". The latter peaked at number 11 on the US Billboard Hot 100, becoming Trainor's first song to enter its top 20 since 2016, and reached the top 10 in other countries. Reviewers thought the album effectively showcased Trainor's maturity and growth over her career as well as her musicality, but they were divided on whether it was a progression from her earlier work. Takin' It Back debuted at number 16 on the US Billboard 200 and reached the top 40 in Australia, Canada, Denmark, the Netherlands, and Norway. A deluxe edition of the album, supported by the single "Mother", was released on March 10, 2023.

== Background and development ==
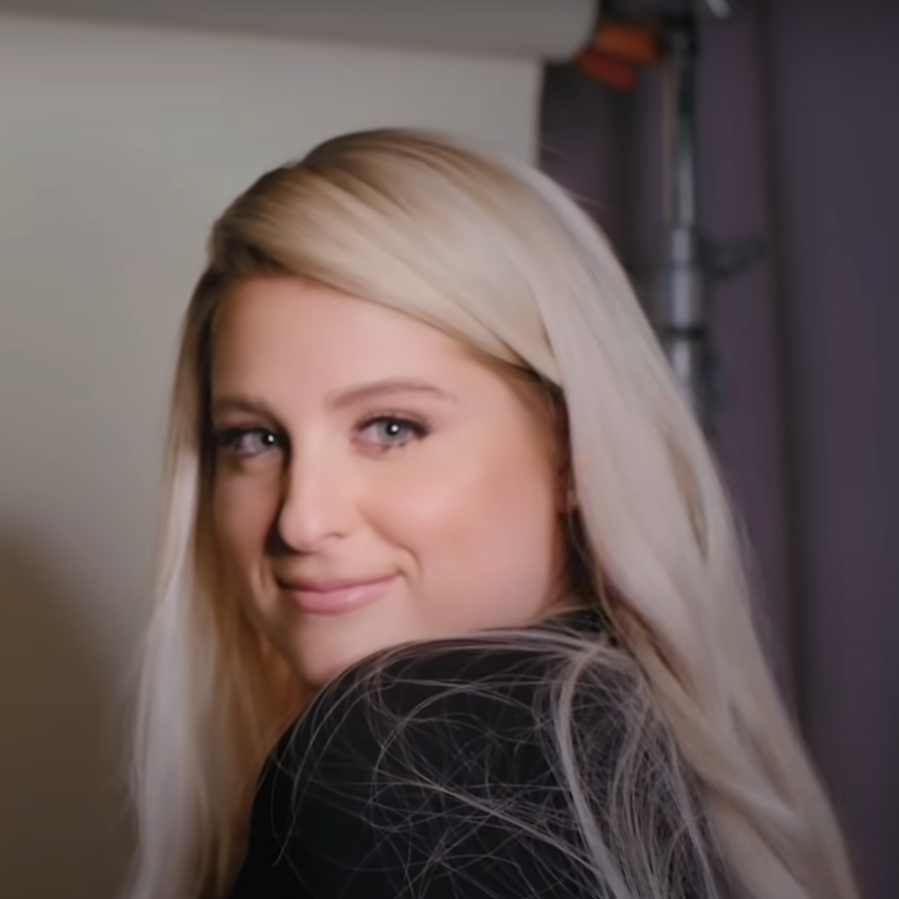
Meghan Trainor (pictured in 2020) started the songs included on Takin' It Back alone, and she has a writing credit on all of them.

Trainor achieved commercial success with her debut major-label studio album, Title (2015), which produced three top-10 singles on the US Billboard Hot 100. She struggled while creating her third album with Epic Records, Treat Myself (2020), and rewrote it four times in an attempt to respond to market shifts in the music industry after the preceding singles underperformed. After the song "Title" attained viral popularity on video-sharing service TikTok in 2021, Trainor announced her intention to return to its parent album's doo-wop sound on her fifth major-label studio album. TikTok was highly influential on her creative process, and she began writing material that would resonate with audiences on it. Trainor gained popularity on it while regularly sharing clips and other content with influencer Chris Olsen. She used TikTok to engage with global audiences, after traditional methods of promotion were ineffective for her last album, and started planning "TikTok days" on which she would film videos.

Producers of Takin' It Back include Trainor and her brother Justin, Federico Vindver, Gian Stone, Teddy Geiger, Afterhrs, Rafa, Kid Harpoon, and Tyler Johnson. Vindver, producer of three tracks for Trainor's Christmas album A Very Trainor Christmas (2020), contributed eight tracks. Stone, whom she had wished to work with since hearing his production on Ariana Grande and Justin Bieber's 2020 single "Stuck with U", produced four tracks for the standard edition of Takin' It Back. Trainor would write a chorus for each song before going into sessions, but she doubted the quality. Her collaborators on previous albums would dismiss ideas she had conceived prior to sessions, but Trainor started the material worked on for Takin' It Back alone. Trainor believed her songwriting improved since having a caesarean section during the birth of her son, as she learned to love her body again after sustaining stretch marks and a scar.

After songwriter Mozella told Trainor that other artists wished to emulate her signature doo-wop sound, they wrote the song "Don't I Make It Look Easy". Trainor felt the song would delight listeners, reminiscent of her feelings after writing "Dear Future Husband" (2015), and she decided on Takin' It Back as the album title. She described the album's material as "big, powerful songs that mean a lot"; the subject matter revolves around her experiences with motherhood and embracing "not [being] perfect all the time". Trainor stated: "it's true to myself in all the weird genres that I go to, but also modern with my doo-wop in there. The lyrics are stronger than ever, and it's still a party."

== Composition ==
The digital edition of Takin' It Back contains 16 tracks; on physical editions, the track "Remind Me" is exclusive to the Target version. It predominantly has a doo-wop and bubblegum pop sound. AllMusic's Stephen Thomas Erlewine wrote that Takin' It Back minimally employs electronic elements and comprises mainly old-timey but contemporarily presented tracks. Peter Piatkowski of PopMatters thought that along with the 1950s, the album was influenced by Motown, Carole King's Brill Building music, and the 1970s.

"Made You Look"
Trainor conceived Takin' It Back as a return to the doo-wop sound of Title. "Made You Look" is a doo-wop song that recalls earlier styles of popular music.

The opening track, "Sensitive", is a 1950s-influenced a cappella song, built on harmonies and featuring vocals by American singer Scott Hoying. "Made You Look" is a doo-wop song that recalls earlier styles of popular music, inspired by Trainor's body image insecurities after pregnancy and a challenge from her therapist to look at herself naked for five minutes. She wrote the title track about bringing back old-school music which featured more real instruments. Its production incorporates digital components and modern R&B beats. The fourth track, "Don't I Make It Look Easy", has percussion instrumentation and R&B elements; its lyrics are about how Trainor makes her duties as a new mother look easy, akin to people only posting their best experiences on social media. "Shook" is about her confidence in her looks and references her posterior. "Bad for Me", featuring Teddy Swims, is a pop song with gospel influences and an instrumentation of piano and an acoustic guitar. It is about distancing oneself from a toxic family member. The seventh track, "Superwoman", is a ballad on which Trainor emphasizes the various identities and spaces women steer through. Piatkowski described it as "an achingly open and vulnerable poem about a woman trying to be everything to everyone", that dismisses typical narratives about women being "girlboss[es]" and acknowledges difficulties faced by them. "Rainbow", a song about coming out and self-acceptance, opens as a slow piano ballad and transitions into a doo-wop song midway.

The ninth track, "Breezy", is a reggae song which features Theron Theron, incorporating debonair horns and clinking piano riffs. "Mama Wanna Mambo" features guest appearances by Natti Natasha and Arturo Sandoval, and was inspired by Perry Como's 1954 single "Papa Loves Mambo". It is a reggaeton song about mothers wanting a dance break in the middle of caring for their children. Trainor demands loyalty from her partner and assures him that her excessively dramatic behavior is "all out of love" on "Drama Queen". On the 12th track, "While You're Young", she assures her adolescent self her dreams will come true and asks people who feel inadequate and face insecurities to learn through experience: "Make mistakes, give your heart a break." "Lucky" is about the gratitude one feels for having someone else in their life. "Dance About It" is a 1970s-influenced midtempo disco funk song, which has a "glitter-ball disco pulse" according to Erlewine.

"Remind Me" was the first song Trainor wrote for the album at a time when she was struggling with self-doubt: "I was like, I'm lost. I feel like I lost my power. I can't look at myself right now. I'm struggling more than ever. And I need my husband and people who love me to remind me that I'm awesome because I don't feel awesome." Takin' It Back closes with "Final Breath", a downtempo love song which Piatkowski described as "moody, ruminative"; inspired by death anxiety, Trainor contemplates spending her final moments with her husband after living a long life: "If I could, I'd do it all over again". The doo-wop-influenced deluxe edition track "Mother" samples the Chordettes's 1954 single "Mr. Sandman". In the song, Trainor addresses men who dismiss her opinions and asks them to stop mansplaining and to listen to her. This edition also includes "Special Delivery" featuring Max, "Grow Up", and a remix of "Made You Look" featuring Kim Petras.

== Release and promotion ==
On May 11, 2022, Trainor uploaded an episode dedicated to the album's creation process, titled "Workin' on Making an Album", on her podcast Workin on It. On June 22, 2022, Rolling Stone announced the album, titled Takin' It Back, would be released on October 21, 2022, and Trainor shared its official artwork on social media. "Bad for Me" was released as its lead single two days later. The song reached the top 30 on the Adult Contemporary and Adult Top 40 radio-format charts in the US, and entered digital sales charts in Canada and the UK. Trainor and Swims performed it on Jimmy Kimmel Live! and The Late Late Show with James Corden in the summer of 2022. The second single, "Made You Look" impacted hot adult contemporary radio stations in the US on October 31, 2022. The song went viral on TikTok. It peaked at number 11 on the US Billboard Hot 100, becoming Trainor's first song to enter its top 20 since 2016, and reached the top 10 in other countries, including Australia, Canada, New Zealand, and the UK.

On October 21, 2022, Trainor performed "Bad for Me", "Don't I Make It Look Easy", and "Made You Look" on The Today Show. She reprised "Made You Look" on The Tonight Show Starring Jimmy Fallon, The Wonderful World of Disney: Magical Holiday Celebration, The Drew Barrymore Show, and Australian Idol. The deluxe edition was released on March 10, 2023. Its lead single, "Mother", was sent to hot adult contemporary radio stations in the US on March 27, 2023, and it reached the top 40 in Ireland and the UK. The song's music video includes an appearance from Kris Jenner.

== Critical reception ==
Professional ratings
Review scores
Source	Rating
AllMusic	3.5/5 stars
PopMatters	7/10

According to Martina Inchingolo of the Associated Press, Takin' It Back featured a more adult version of Trainor, showcasing her growth since marriage and motherhood; Inchingolo described it as an edifying therapy session and a "fluctuation of genres and feelings" that made the listener feel less solitary. Renowned for Sound's Max Akass described it as Trainor's "most complete album to date" and appreciated her intention to take more power over her career after being controlled on previous releases; he considered that Trainor ventured into new musical territory and took her music to "more interesting places". Piatkowski felt that Takin' It Back reflected the confidence Trainor had gained from becoming a "major pop star" and believed it inaccurate to label it a retread of her debut record. He wrote that the album did not constitute a definitive return to form for Trainor, some of its catchier parts sounding flimsy and breezy "to the point of candy floss", but that its ballads were more meaningful and the high points of the album.

Erlewine wrote that Takin' It Back was not necessarily a cutting-edge pop album, as Trainor's commitment to resurrecting Title's spirit "means that the attitude and melody can occasionally seem preserved in amber", but that overall it effectively demonstrated her gift for hooks and musical theater flair. Writing for Riff, Piper Westrom opined that the album "largely sticks to what [Trainor] knows" and would not shock fans of her previous work, "check[ing] all the boxes for listeners and mak[ing] for a solid pop album".

== Commercial performance ==
Takin' It Back was Trainor's highest-charting album since her second major-label studio album, Thank You (2016), in some countries. In the US, Takin' It Back debuted at number 16 on the Billboard 200 with sales of approximately 20,000 copies. The album debuted at number 21 and charted for 20 weeks on the Canadian Albums Chart, recording an improvement from her last two albums which only charted two weeks each. It reached number 30 in Australia and number 67 in the UK. Takin' It Back charted at number 12 in Norway and number 19 in the Netherlands, becoming Trainor's highest-peaking album since Title in both countries. The album peaked at number 37 in Denmark, number 82 in Spain, number 98 in Switzerland, and number 99 in Ireland. It received a gold certification in Brazil.

== Track listing ==
Takin' It Back – Standard edition
No.	Title	Writer(s)	Producer(s)	Length
1.	"Sensitive" (featuring Scott Hoying)	Meghan Trainor; Kole; Tobias Gad	M. Trainor	2:58
2.	"Made You Look"	M. Trainor; Sean Douglas; Federico Vindver	Vindver	2:14
3.	"Takin' It Back"	M. Trainor; Justin Trainor; Ryan Trainor; Vindver	Vindver; J. Trainor	2:21
4.	"Don't I Make It Look Easy"	M. Trainor; Maureen McDonald; Vindver	Vindver	2:34
5.	"Shook"	M. Trainor; J. Trainor; R. Trainor; Douglas; Gian Stone	Stone	2:23
6.	"Bad for Me" (featuring Teddy Swims)	M. Trainor; Stephen Wrabel; Ajay Bhattacharyya; Vindver	Vindver; Stint^{[a]}	3:33
7.	"Superwoman"	M. Trainor; Daniel Dodd Wilson	M. Trainor; J. Trainor	2:25
8.	"Rainbow"	M. Trainor; Teddy Geiger; Andrew Haas; Ian Franzino	Geiger; Afterhrs; Stone	3:21
9.	"Breezy" (featuring Theron Theron)	M. Trainor; Stone; Vindver; Theron Thomas	Vindver; Stone	3:04
10.	"Mama Wanna Mambo" (featuring Natti Natasha and Arturo Sandoval)	M. Trainor; Douglas; Vindver; Natalia Batista; Arturo Sandoval	Vindver; Rafa	2:56
11.	"Drama Queen"	M. Trainor; Douglas; Vindver	Vindver	3:08
12.	"While You're Young"	M. Trainor; Thomas Hull; Tyler Johnson	Kid Harpoon; Johnson	2:30
13.	"Lucky"	M. Trainor; Douglas; Stone	Stone; J. Trainor^{[a]}; Vindver^{[a]}	3:08
14.	"Dance About It"	M. Trainor; J. Trainor; R. Trainor	J. Trainor	3:16
15.	"Remind Me" (bonus track)	M. Trainor; McDonald; Vindver	Vindver	3:20
16.	"Final Breath"	M. Trainor; Hull; Johnson	Kid Harpoon; Johnson; M. Trainor	2:25
Total length:				45:36

Takin' It Back – Deluxe edition
No.	Title	Writer(s)	Producer(s)	Length
1.	"Mother"	M. Trainor; J. Trainor; Douglas; Stone; Pat Ballard	Stone	2:27
2.	"Don't I Make It Look Easy"	M. Trainor; Maureen McDonald; Vindver	Vindver	2:34
3.	"Made You Look"	M. Trainor; Sean Douglas; Federico Vindver	Vindver	2:14
4.	"Shook"	M. Trainor; J. Trainor; R. Trainor; Douglas; Gian Stone	Stone	2:23
5.	"Takin' It Back"	M. Trainor; Justin Trainor; Ryan Trainor; Vindver	Vindver; J. Trainor	2:21
6.	"Special Delivery" (featuring Max)	M. Trainor; Maxwell Schneider; Vindver; Janée Bennett	Vindver	3:04
7.	"Bad for Me" (featuring Teddy Swims)	M. Trainor; Stephen Wrabel; Ajay Bhattacharyya; Vindver	Vindver; Stint^{[a]}	3:33
8.	"Superwoman"	M. Trainor; Daniel Dodd Wilson	M. Trainor; J. Trainor	2:25
9.	"Rainbow"	M. Trainor; Teddy Geiger; Andrew Haas; Ian Franzino	Geiger; Afterhrs; Stone	3:21
10.	"Breezy" (featuring Theron Theron)	M. Trainor; Stone; Vindver; Theron Thomas	Vindver; Stone	3:04
11.	"Mama Wanna Mambo" (featuring Natti Natasha and Arturo Sandoval)	M. Trainor; Douglas; Vindver; Natalia Batista; Arturo Sandoval	Vindver; Rafa	2:56
12.	"Dance About It"	M. Trainor; J. Trainor; R. Trainor	J. Trainor	3:16
13.	"While You're Young"	M. Trainor; Thomas Hull; Tyler Johnson	Kid Harpoon; Johnson	2:30
14.	"Sensitive" (featuring Scott Hoying)	Meghan Trainor; Kole; Tobias Gad	M. Trainor	2:58
15.	"Drama Queen"	M. Trainor; Douglas; Vindver	Vindver	3:08
16.	"Lucky"	M. Trainor; Douglas; Stone	Stone; J. Trainor^{[a]}; Vindver^{[a]}	3:08
17.	"Grow Up"	M. Trainor; Stone; Douglas	Stone	2:56
18.	"Remind Me"	M. Trainor; McDonald; Vindver	Vindver	3:20
19.	"Made You Look" (featuring Kim Petras)	M. Trainor; Kim Petras; Vindver; Douglas	Vindver	2:27
20.	"Final Breath"	M. Trainor; Hull; Johnson	Kid Harpoon; Johnson; M. Trainor	2:25
Total length:				56:38

Notes

- ^{^[a]} signifies an additional producer
- "Remind Me" is only included on digital releases and the standard edition Target CDs for the album.

== Personnel ==
Credits are adapted from the liner notes of Takin' It Back.

Musicians

- Meghan Trainor – lead vocals, background vocals (all tracks); vocal arrangement (1, 6), programming (7, 16), keyboards (13), piano (16)
- Scott Hoying – background vocals (1, 6, 8), vocal arrangement (1, 6)
- Federico Vindver – keyboards (2, 3, 6, 9, 11, 14), programming (2–4, 6, 9, 11, 13, 14); drums, percussion (2); guitar (3, 4, 6, 11, 13, 14), bass (6), piano (6, 8, 11, 14), background vocals (10)
- Jesse McGinty – baritone saxophone, trombone (2)
- Mike Cordone – trumpet (2)
- Guillermo Vadalá – bass (3, 4, 9, 11)
- Drew Taubenfeld – electric guitar (3), acoustic guitar (7), guitar (11, 13)
- Justin Trainor – background vocals (3, 5, 6, 10–12), keyboards (3), programming (3, 7, 13, 14)
- Tristan Hurd – trumpet (3, 12, 14)
- Kiel Feher – drums (4)
- Andrew Synowiec – guitar (4)
- Daryl Sabara – background vocals (5, 6, 10, 11, 13)
- Chris Pepe – background vocals (5, 13)
- Gian Stone – background vocals (5, 10, 13), programming (5, 9, 13), bass (8, 13); guitar, keyboards (13)
- Ryan Trainor – background vocals (5, 10, 14)
- Sean Douglas – background vocals (5, 10, 11, 13), keyboards (13)
- Ivan Jackson – trumpet (5), horn (9, 13)
- Teddy Swims – lead vocals, background vocals (6)
- Ajay Bhattacharyya – background vocals (6)
- Isaiah Gage – strings (7)
- Ian Franzino – background vocals, programming (8)
- Andrew Haas – background vocals, guitar, piano, programming (8)
- Teddy Geiger – background vocals, guitar, piano, programming (8)
- The Regiment – horn (8)
- Kurt Thum – organ (8, 9)
- John Arndt – piano (8)
- Theron Thomas – lead vocals (9)
- Brian Letiecq – guitar (9)
- Morgan Price – horn (9, 13)
- Angel Torres – alto saxophone (10)
- Ramon Sanchez – arrangement (10)
- Natti Natasha – lead vocals, background vocals (10)
- Sammy Vélez – baritone saxophone (10)
- Pedro Pérez – bass (10)
- Pedro "Pete" Perignon – bongos (10)
- William "Kachiro" Thompson – congas (10)
- Josué Urbiba – tenor saxophone (10)
- Jean Carlos Camuñas – timbales (10)
- Lester Pérez – trombone (10)
- Anthony Rosado – trombone (10)
- Jésus Alonso – trumpet (10)
- Arturo Sandoval – trumpet (10)
- Luis Angel Figueroa – trumpet (10)
- Kid Harpoon – programming (12, 16); acoustic guitar, bass, electric guitar, piano, synthesizer (12)
- Aaron Sterling – drums (12)
- Tyler Johnson – programming (12, 16), keyboards (12)
- Cole Kamen-Green – trumpet (12)
- Greg Wieczorek – drums (13)
- Ben Rice – guitar, keyboards (13)

Technical

- Randy Merrill – mastering
- Meghan Trainor – mixing (1, 7, 14), engineering (1), vocal production (all tracks)
- Justin Trainor – mixing (1, 7, 14), engineering (1–14, 16)
- Jeremie Inhaber – mixing (2, 3, 5, 6, 10, 11, 13, 14)
- Josh Gudwin – mixing (4)
- Gian Stone – mixing (8), engineering (5, 8, 9, 13), vocal production (5, 9, 13)
- Kevin Davis – mixing (9)
- Spike Stent – mixing (12)
- Federico Vindver – engineering (2–4, 6, 9–11, 14), vocal production (4, 10, 14)
- Peter Hanaman – engineering (4, 14)
- Ian Franzino – engineering (8)
- Andrew Haas – engineering (8)
- Chad Copelin – engineering (8)
- Carlitos Vélasquez – engineering (10)
- Jeremy Hatcher – engineering (12, 16)
- Brian Rajaratnam – engineering (12, 16)
- Scott Hoying – vocal production (6)
- Heidi Wang – engineering assistance (4)
- Matt Wolach – engineering assistance (12, 16)

== Charts ==
Weekly chart performance for Takin' It Back
Chart (2022)	Peak position
Australian Albums (ARIA)	30
Canadian Albums (Billboard)	21
Danish Albums (Tracklisten)	37
Dutch Albums (Album Top 100)	19
Irish Albums (IRMA)	99
Norwegian Albums (VG-lista)	12
Spanish Albums (Promusicae)	82
Swiss Albums (Schweizer Hitparade)	98
UK Albums (Official Charts)	67
US Billboard 200	16

== Certifications ==
Certification for Takin' It Back
Region	Certification	Certified units/sales
Brazil (Pro-Música Brasil)	Gold	20,000^{‡}
Denmark (IFPI Danmark)	Gold	10,000^{‡}
New Zealand (RMNZ)	Gold	7,500^{‡}
^{‡} Sales+streaming figures based on certification alone.

== Release history ==
Release dates and format(s) for Takin' It Back
Region	Date	Format(s)	Label	Edition	Ref.
Various	October 21, 2022	Cassette; CD; digital download; LP; streaming	Epic	Original	
Various	March 10, 2023	CD; digital download; streaming	Epic	Deluxe	
