= I Am Cait =

American transgender reality TV show about Caitlyn Jenner

- Genre: Reality television
- Starring: Caitlyn Jenner; Candis Cayne; Jennifer Finney Boylan; Kate Bornstein; Zackary Drucker; Chandi Moore; Ella Giselle; Sophia Hutchins; Courtney Nanson
- Country of origin: United States
- Original language: English
- No. of seasons: 2
- No. of episodes: 16

Production
- Executive producers: Gil Goldschein; Jeff Jenkins; Farnaz Farjam; Andrea Metz; Melissa Bidwell; Caitlyn Jenner
- Camera setup: Multiple
- Running time: 42 minutes
- Production company: Bunim/Murray Productions

Original release
- Network: E!
- Release: July 26, 2015 – April 24, 2016

Related
- Keeping Up with the Kardashians

I Am Cait is an American television documentary series which chronicles the life of Caitlyn Jenner after her gender transition. The eight-part one-hour documentary series debuted on July 26, 2015, on the E! network. The series focuses on the "new normal" for Jenner, exploring changes to her relationships with her family and friends. The show additionally explores how Jenner adjusts to what she sees as her job as a role model for the transgender community.

In its first season, critical reception of I Am Cait was generally positive. Critics particularly praised the series' approach to the social issues of the transgender community and its influence on the way Americans see and understand transgender people in general. The show's informative and serious tone was also noted, and how it differed from Keeping Up with the Kardashians, a reality series that Jenner has starred in together with her family. In October, the show was renewed for a second season, which premiered on March 6, 2016.

On August 16, 2016, E! cancelled the series after two seasons, due to low ratings.

== Production ==
The network announced the documentary series on April 24, 2015, immediately after Caitlyn Jenner came out as a trans woman during a 20/20 interview with Diane Sawyer. "Bruce is incredibly courageous and an inspiration, and we are proud to be entrusted with this deeply personal and important story," said Jeff Olde, Head of Programming of E! network. "This series will present an unfiltered look as Bruce boldly steps into uncharted territory and is true to himself for the first time," Olde also added. The series has selected a renowned group of consultants, including Jennifer Finney Boylan, Dr. Marie Keller and Susan P. Landon, who will work on the show to keep it insightful, as well as enlisted support from GLAAD, an LGBTQ-focused media advocacy organization. The first trailer for the series, now titled I Am Cait, was released on June 3, 2015, after Jenner introduced herself as Caitlyn in the interview with Vanity Fair.

The idea of the reality television series which would document the gender transition of Caitlyn Jenner was initially introduced about a year before the show was announced to the public. Jeff Jenkins, one of the producers on Keeping Up with the Kardashians, got a call about a meeting with Jenner, thus confirming the rumors of her transition. The series was confirmed several months later once Jenner got the right idea about the purpose of the series. "She would have been so hounded for the story and that's why, in my understanding, she decided, ... so [she could] hopefully tell all of it in the right way," Jenkins speculated the reasons why Jenner accepted the series. "Why did I decide to do a series? I am telling my story ... This is about getting to be who you really are," Jenner later herself explained the reasons for opening her life on television in one of the promotional videos.

Several days later after the interview with Diane Sawyer, E! aired a two-part episode special on Keeping Up with the Kardashians entitled About Bruce, in which another side of the story was told featuring family members who did not appear in the previous interview on 20/20. Dee Lockett, writing for Vulture, speculated that the interviews were "strategically set up Caitlyn's transition to become the show's next must-watch spectacle, [I Am Cait]". Caitlyn Jenner has been appearing on the family's reality show since its introduction and was considered as a sidelined character. Lockett also noted that the special "was a test-run, for both Caitlyn and E!, to see how their fan-favorite reality series would look with one of its most underappreciated characters (and last names) running the show."

The show premiered on E!, the same network which serves as the home to Keeping Up with the Kardashians, a reality television series that Jenner has starred in together with her family since 2007. I Am Cait is produced by Bunim/Murray Productions, the same company that created Keeping Up With the Kardashians, with Gil Goldschein, Jeff Jenkins, Farnaz Farjam, Andrea Metz and Melissa Bidwell as well as Jenner herself acting as executive producers. A private screening of the premiere was held by Jenner a week prior to its official airing, while the first episode of I Am Cait was shown to critics in Manhattan two days later. The docu-series was released amidst a wave of new programming related to transgender issues, including TLC's reality show I Am Jazz and ABC Family's Becoming Us.

In October 2015, the network announced that the reality series will return for a second season. "Caitlyn's story has ignited a global conversation on the transgender community on a scale that has never been seen before," said Jeff Olde, an executive vice president of E!. "We are honored Caitlyn has chosen to continue to share her ongoing story with our viewers around the world", Olde also added. Season 2 premiered on March 6, 2016.

=== Supporting cast ===
The show includes a number of transgender people who have become part of Jenner's inner circle, featured throughout the show with their own sub-plots and to offer information on the transgender community. Jennifer Finney Boylan, Candis Cayne, Sophia Hutchins, Chandi Moore, Zackary Drucker and Kate Bornstein have all appeared since the show's inception. Jen Richards was a member of the supporting cast but left after Season 1. Jenner's hair stylist Courtney Nanson has also appeared since season 1. Jenner's best friend and personal assistant Ronda Kamihira appeared in Season 1 only. Since Season 2, an 18-year-old member of the transgender community named Ella Giselle has appeared.

== Episodes ==
Season	Episodes	Originally released	
Season	Episodes	First released	Last released
1	8	July 26, 2015	September 13, 2015
2	8	March 6, 2016	April 24, 2016

=== Season 1 (2015) ===
No. overall	No. in season	Title	Original release date	U.S. viewers (millions)
1	1	"Cait"	July 26, 2015	2.73
Caitlyn Jenner finally announces her new identity to the public and shares the news with her family for the first time. Jenner gets extremely nervous before meeting her mother, Esther, who initially has a hard time accepting the changes. Jenner's daughter, Kylie, unexpectedly visits her house and helps Jenner with hair extensions. Jenner's step-daughter Kim Kardashian and her husband Kanye West later visit her. Throughout the episode Jenner talks about the significantly higher suicide rates among transgender teens and later visits parents of Kyler Prescott, one of the victims of transphobia.
2	2	"The Road Trip: Part 1"	August 2, 2015	1.29
Jenner invites six active members of the transgender community to dinner: Zackary Drucker, Jen Richards, Drian Juarez, Jennifer Finney Boylan, Chandi Moore and Candis Cayne. The group goes on a road trip to Sonoma County, California with her new friends from LGBT community who wonder whether Jenner is a suitable person to become their new spokesperson because of her privileged celebrity status.
3	3	"The Road Trip: Part 2"	August 9, 2015	1.20
Caitlyn wants to give her new friends the trip of a lifetime and they challenge Caitlyn to break down her walls and get personal. Cait must find a way to balance her old friendships with her new ones.
4	4	"Family Interference"	August 16, 2015	1.32
Candis Cayne invites Caitlyn over for an all-girl sleep over. Kim and Khloé Kardashian discuss comments aimed at Kris Jenner in her Vanity Fair article. Later, Caitlyn visits a support group for families with children that are transitioning.
5	5	"Take Pride"	August 23, 2015	1.02
Caitlyn refers to the LGBT community as "they" until she visits a NYC Pride event and finally feels included. Caitlyn tries to reconnect with her male friends and Scott Disick offers his advice.
6	6	"The Dating Game"	August 30, 2015	1.11
Caitlyn realizes how hard it can be to date as a trans woman when Candis Cayne talks about her relationship history. Caitlyn tries to get Candis to believe in love again. Jenny Boylan urges Caitlyn to talk about who she's attracted to.
7	7	"What's in a Name?"	September 6, 2015	1.09
Caitlyn is hesitant to use her new name at her country club, but she officially changes her IDs when Candis calls her out for playing both sides. Caitlyn's anxiety grows as she prepares for The Espys and a sit-down with Kris Jenner.
8	8	"A New Beginning"	September 13, 2015	1.26
Caitlyn and Kris Jenner sit down to air their grievances with each other in an attempt to move forward as a family. Caitlyn plans a spiritual ceremony to claim her new name, and it becomes a symbolic celebration for her new friends.

=== Season 2 (2016) ===
No. overall	No. in season	Title	Original release date	U.S. viewers (millions)
9	1	"Politically Incorrect"	March 6, 2016	0.75
Cait and her friends embark on an epic cross-country road trip in a tour bus, and the other women take the opportunity to corner Cait about her sexual orientation and her politics.
10	2	"Woman of the Year?"	March 13, 2016	0.48
After a political fight on the bus gets heated, the women decide to confront Cait on her aggressive debating style and suggest a more feminine approach.
11	3	"Partner Up"	March 20, 2016	0.72
After witnessing Candis Cayne get stood up by a guy because she's trans, Cait reveals her deepest fears about dating men.
12	4	"The Great Debate"	March 27, 2016	0.55
Cait struggles to show restraint during the Democratic debates, but so do her friends when they visit Cait's alma mater, which is a conservative Christian college in Iowa.
13	5	"Great Scott!"	April 3, 2016	0.62
When the newly sober Scott Disick visits Cait on the road trip, they struggle to find common ground. Meanwhile, Cait and the women attend a ceremony for Transgender Day of Remembrance.
14	6	"Guess Who's Coming to Dinner?"	April 10, 2016	0.79
In an attempt to improve their relationship, Kris Jenner visits Cait in New Orleans. But when old wounds arise between the exes, Cait's friends must intervene.
15	7	"Kiss and Make-Up"	April 17, 2016	0.86
An apology by Cait goes towards her trying to take responsibility for her part in the ending of her marriage to ex-wife Kris Jenner. Elsewhere, Candis Cayne looks into her options to adopt a baby.
16	8	"Houston, We Have a Problem"	April 24, 2016	0.86
Cait is determined to prove that she is committed to the LGBT cause by risking arrest in Houston with her friends. Meanwhile, Ella attempts to mend fences with her father who struggled to accept her transition. Also, while with the girls, Cait and Candis Cayne share a kiss.

== Reception ==
=== Critical response ===
I Am Cait ..., very un-Kardashians-like in its earnestness, is always conscious of its dual purpose: it's a personal story played out for an audience of millions, on behalf of a much larger community. The premiere episode is emotional but controlled, much like Jenner's carefully media-managed coming-out, from her Diane Sawyer primetime interview to the sultry cover of Vanity Fair magazine to her heart-tugging acceptance of the Arthur Ashe Courage Award from ESPN.

— James Poniewozik from Time magazine

The first episode of I Am Cait has been met with generally positive reviews from television critics, who were given an advance screening of the series premiere. At Metacritic, which assigns a weighted mean rating out of 100 to reviews from mainstream critics, the docuseries received an average score of 67, based on seventeen reviews. Brian Lowry from Variety magazine appreciated the show's goal by saying that "tension is very much on display in the premiere, which obviously seeks a more elevated plane – keenly aware of Jenner's platform to educate and assist vulnerable youths – while clinging to familiar reality-TV conventions."

Frank Scheck, a critic from The Hollywood Reporter, also emphasized the show's approach to addressing transgender issues, writing, "clearly striving to impart serious messages about tolerance of the transgender community while throwing in a few Kardashians for comic relief, I Am Cait emerges as a surprisingly thoughtful if undeniably self-serving effort." He also worried whether the show would be capable to "continue its delicate balancing act of depicting the many challenges attendant to Jenner's new identity while presenting the sensationalistic comic material which reality viewers crave." Jane Mulkerrins of The Telegraph called the show "noble" and appreciated the show's approach to the issues, and also noted that the show contains "plenty of levity" as well.

Tom Gliatto from People magazine said that the show "is closer in tone to a reality show on Oprah Winfrey's OWN than E!" Verne Gay, writing for Newsday, called the show "the most anticipated docuseries" in E!'s history and noted its different approach by adding that what "viewers will ... see Sunday is something entirely new -- also bracing, emotional and even touching." Sandra Gonzalez of Mashable applauded the series and said that "the show also makes a point of spotlighting stories that don't end when the TV is switched off or the magazines are no longer on the stands." She also added that "with moments both stark and silly, the series has exactly what it needs to exist on a network where entertainment and empathy don't always go hand-in-hand." Michael Idato from The Sydney Morning Herald described the series as "uncomfortably, beautifully, brutally honest." Don Kaplan of the New York Daily News said the show "is touching, funny and smart as it tracks the immediate aftermath of Jenner's much-publicized shift from a man who spent the last 40 years as one of the world's most masculine athletes to a woman deeply concerned about how this new lifestyle will affect her immediate family."

Mike Hale of The New York Times wrote a less enthusiastic review, stating that the "glossy" series lacked conflict. Hale wrote that I Am Cait "accomplishes its inspirational, educational and motivational goals ... It doesn't totally succeed as dramatic reality television, but perhaps that's to be expected given how high the stakes are, both for the transgender cause and for Ms. Jenner's personal brand." Hale also compared I Am Cait with the other two new reality series about transgender people, writing that I Am Jazz and Becoming Us "... are more able to generate some tension and discord, perhaps because they focus on younger people and take place outside the celebrity bubble of affirmation." Michelle Ruiz from Vogue magazine noted how important the show is for the American people, who still struggle to understand transgender people. "But if it makes it a little harder for someone who has never met a transgender person to reduce them to an abstract idea instead of a human being, it's a start," the critic added.

=== Ratings ===
The initial airing of the show's premiere averaged a 1.2 rating in adults 18-49 and 2.73 million viewers overall. The Australian premiere on E! Australia was the ninth most watched program on subscription television rating 59,000 viewers.

=== Awards ===
The show tied for best Outstanding Reality Program at the 27th GLAAD Media Awards in April 2016.

== Broadcast history ==
The documentary series premiered in the United States and Canada at 8:00 PM ET on July 26, 2015, on E! cable network. In Australia, the series debuted on the local version of E! on July 27, and in the United Kingdom beginning on August 2, 2015. Additionally, the series is broadcast worldwide on local E! channels in 123 countries and has been translated into 24 languages.

== Home media ==
On November 26, 2015, the first season was released on DVD in Australia. The second season was released on July 7, 2016.

== See also ==
- The Secrets of My Life
- Becoming Us
- I Am Jazz
- Media portrayals of transgender people
