= Mother (Meghan Trainor song) =

2023 song by Meghan Trainor

Single by Meghan Trainor

from the album Takin' It Back (Deluxe)
- Released: March 27, 2023
- Genre: Pop
- Length: 2:27
- Label: Epic
- Songwriters: Meghan Trainor; Sean Douglas; Gian Stone; Justin Trainor; Pat Ballard (Note: Pat Ballard is credited as he wrote "Mr. Sandman".)
- Producers: Gian Stone; Justin Trainor

Meghan Trainor singles chronology
"Made You Look" (2022)	"Mother" (2023)	"Alright" (2023)

Music video
- "Mother" on YouTube

"Mother" is a song by the American singer-songwriter Meghan Trainor from the deluxe edition of her fifth major-label studio album, Takin' It Back (2022). She co-wrote the song with Sean Douglas and its producers, Gian Stone and her brother Justin. Epic Records released it to US hot adult contemporary radio stations as the deluxe edition's lead single on March 27, 2023. A pop song with doo-wop influences, it interpolates the Chordettes' single "Mr. Sandman". Inspired by men who said Trainor's pregnancy would end her career, the song is about women's empowerment; in its lyrics, she instructs the male subject to stop mansplaining and to listen to her.

Critics were favorable toward its musical composition, while some criticized the lyrics. The song reached the top 30 on national record charts in Belgium, Ireland, Suriname, and the United Kingdom. Charm La'Donna directed and choreographed the music video for it, which stars Kris Jenner. The latter dons a platinum blonde bob and appears in a white silk gown in a scene which channels Marilyn Monroe's performance of "Diamonds Are a Girl's Best Friend" and later with Trainor in matching black gowns. The video received praise for the fashion choices; critics described it as glamorous. Trainor performed "Mother" on The Today Show and Capital's Summertime Ball and included it on the set list of her 2024 concert tour, the Timeless Tour.

== Background and release ==
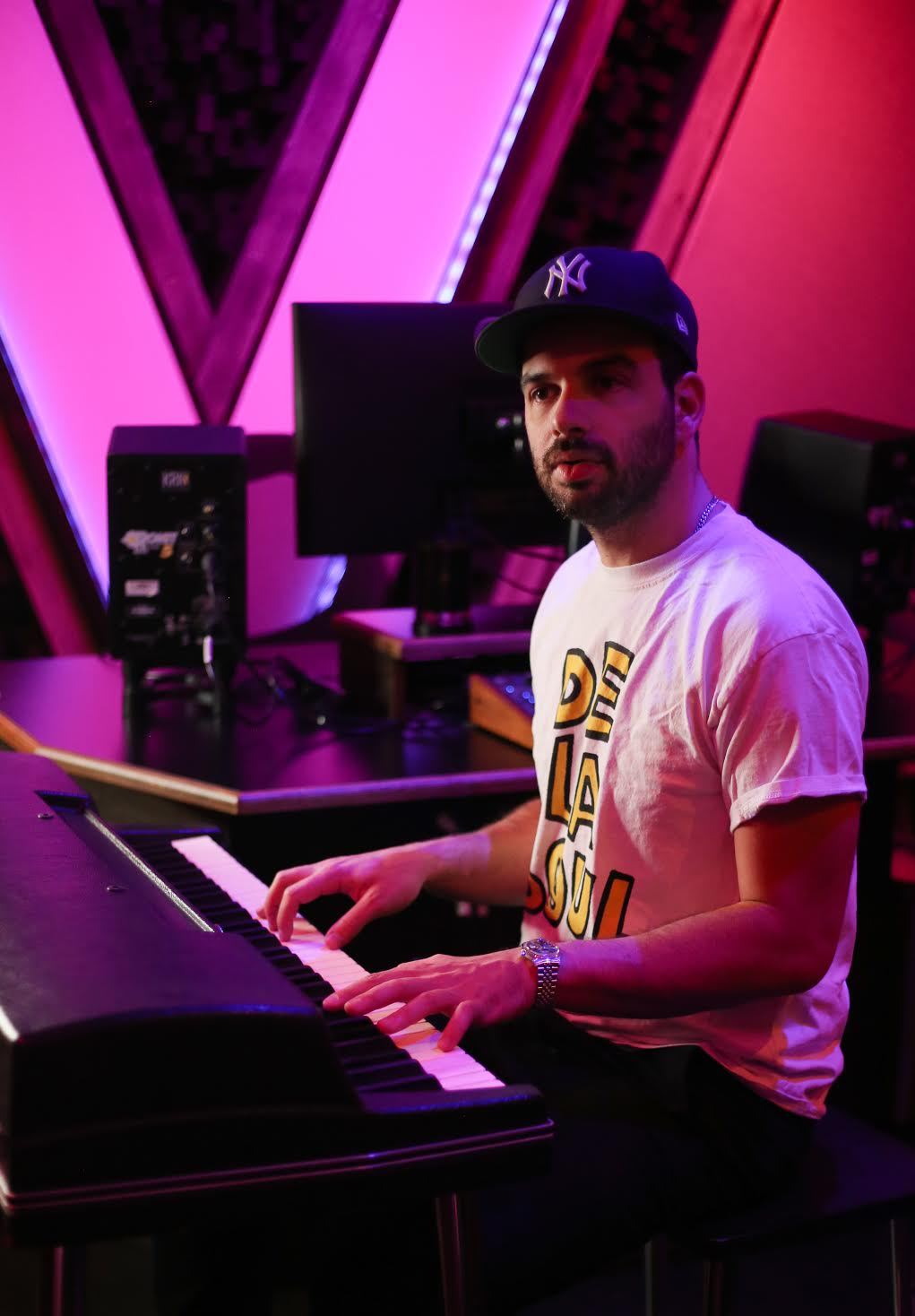
Gian Stone (pictured in 2020) produced and co-wrote "Mother".

After her song "Title" attained viral popularity on video-sharing service TikTok in 2021, Meghan Trainor announced her intention to pivot to its doo-wop sound on her fifth major-label studio album. The platform was highly influential on her creative process, and she began writing material that would resonate with audiences on it. Trainor gained popularity on TikTok while regularly sharing clips and other content with influencer Chris Olsen. Takin' It Back (2022) included the single "Made You Look", which went viral on TikTok. It became Trainor's first song since 2016 to enter the top 40 on the US Billboard Hot 100 and reached the top 10 in several other countries.

Trainor wrote "Mother", the follow-up single, at the "last second". She stated that the song was influenced by "silly men" who warned her "that having a baby would end [her] career." Trainor wanted to create an upbeat and danceable four on the floor song and came up with the lines "I am your mother, bitch/ You listen to me, bitch/ Stop all that mansplainin'/ No one's listenin, bitch" while getting makeup done. She sang the song for her brother Ryan, who disliked it. Trainor recorded 60 different vocals for "Mother", and her brother Justin made a sub-bass for it, after which Ryan said "I hear it now" and could not prevent himself from singing the song repeatedly. Gian Stone produced the song with Justin the following day, and he helped Trainor write the verses alongside songwriter Sean Douglas.

On March 1, 2023, Trainor shared a clip of herself dancing to "Mother" with Olsen and her husband, Daryl Sabara, revealing part of its lyrics. The snippet garnered criticism from online critics, who accused her of making music solely to go viral on TikTok. Trainor announced the song when she was 21 weeks pregnant, following the announcement of her first book, also themed around motherhood, called Dear Future Mama. It was promoted with a YouTube Shorts campaign. "Mother" was serviced to hot adult contemporary radio stations in the United States as the lead single from the deluxe edition of Takin' It Back on March 27. The song was sent for radio airplay in Italy on April 7, 2023. Its radio edit was released for digital download on April 12. On May 12, 2023, an extended play featuring remixes of "Mother" was released. In 2024, she performed the song for The Today Show's Citi concert series and Capital's Summertime Ball. It was included as the opener on the set list of Trainor's 2024 concert tour, the Timeless Tour.

== Composition and lyrics ==
"Mother" is two minutes and 27 seconds long. Stone and Justin produced and programmed the song, and the latter handled the engineering. Stone plays electric guitar and bass, Trainor and Douglas play keyboards, and Tristan Hurd plays trumpet. Jeremie Inhaber mixed the song, and Randy Merrill mastered it at Sterling Sound in New York City.

"Mother"
Trainor claimed she recorded 60 different vocals for "Mother". It interpolates the Chordettes' 1954 single "Mr. Sandman" during the post-chorus.

Musically, "Mother" is a pop song with influences of doo-wop. The song opens with a man vocalizing: "the fact that Meghan Trainor is literally mother right now". It interpolates the Chordettes' 1954 single "Mr. Sandman" during the post-chorus, as Trainor uses the melody while singing the lyric "You just a bum bum bum".

"Mother" is about women's empowerment. In the song, Trainor proclaims that she is the subject's mother and that he should pay attention to what she says. She asks him to quit mansplaining and mocks him for the inability to bear children: "You with your God complex, but you can't even make life, bitch." In other lyrics, Trainor praises her partner's non-controlling nature and ability to satisfy her, and she encourages the man she is addressing to learn from him: "Y'all need a master class from my man / Learn how to satisfy like he can / Ain't tryna control me and own me / Like an old man on C-SPAN."

== Reception ==
Critics were mixed toward the song's musical composition. Rolling Stone's Tomás Mier compared the foppish lyricism of "Mother" to the colorful imagery featured in Trainor's songs "Made You Look" and "Don't I Make It Look Easy". Rachel DeSantis of People described "Mother" as "a retro, doo-wop-inspired bop", Carly Silva of Parade called it a "pop anthem", and Glamour described it as a "catchy ear-worm tune". Sydney Brasil of Exclaim! thought the song was catchy but criticized its lyrics. Writing for Vulture, Wolfgang Ruth predicted that the "bop" would be the first song lipsynced to in RuPaul's Drag Race's next season and thought Trainor victoriously careened into her latest gimmick: "Meghan Trainor is not Mother. But her commitment to the bit sort of is." Some reviewers criticized Trainor for calling herself mother, usually an African-American Vernacular English (AAVE) slang term also adopted by the LGBTQ community. Jezebel's Kady Ruth Ashcraft wrote: "Meghan Trainor is not mother. That sort of honorarium requires much, much better music", and she criticized her for bestowing the title upon herself instead of having it assigned to her by music fans. Brasil believed its righteous intention of "taking down entitled men" was ruined by Trainor's use of the word: "If anybody is 'mother,' it's definitely not a rich straight woman". In a May 2023 New York Times article, actress Michaela Jaé Rodriguez approved of it: "it's right for her, and she can use it in any way she wants to", but she noted that other people's perception may differ.

"Mother" experienced TikTok virality, but unlike "Made You Look", this did not translate into popularity on streaming services. In the United States, "Mother" charted at number 19 on the Bubbling Under Hot 100 issued dated April 1, 2023. The song reached number 83 on the Canadian Hot 100 issued for the same date. It became Trainor's eighth single to reach the top 40 in the United Kingdom, debuting at number 42 on the UK Singles Chart dated March 23, 2023, and peaking at number 22 in its fourth week. "Mother" received a Silver certification from the British Phonographic Industry. In Australia, the song charted at number 49. It reached number eight on the New Zealand Hot Singles chart. "Mother" became Trainor's fourth entry on the Billboard Global 200, debuting at number 196. Elsewhere, the song peaked at number 1 on Sweden's Heatseeker chart, number 2 on the Netherlands's Single Tip chart, number 19 on Japan Hot Overseas, number 23 in Ireland, number 28 in Belgium, number 34 on Canada's CHR/Top 40 chart, number 35 in Suriname, and number 167 on the South Korean Download chart.

== Music video ==
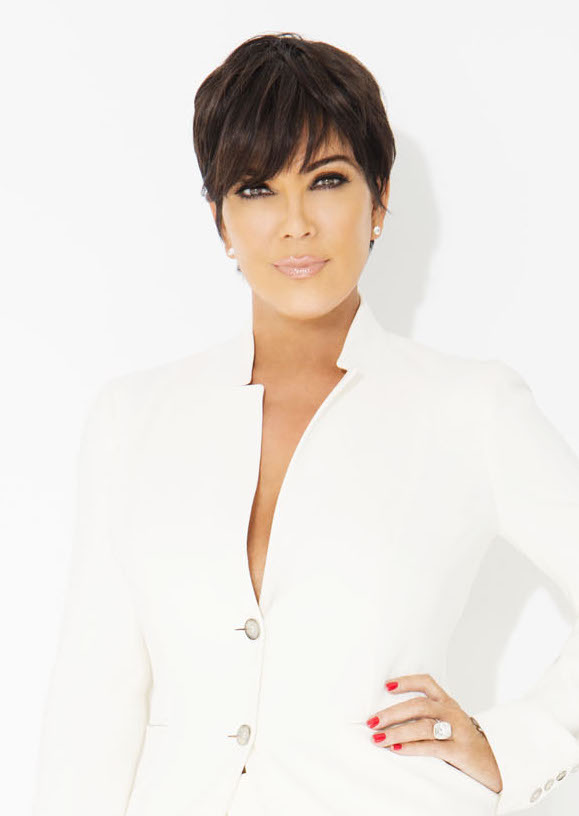
Kris Jenner (pictured in 2014) stars in the music video for "Mother".

Charm La'Donna directed and choreographed the music video for "Mother", which was released on March 10, 2023. Kris Jenner stars in the video; Trainor stated regarding the casting choice: "I jokingly one day was like, 'What if I got the mother of all mothers, like the queen of mothers, to be in this music video, singing the lyrics?'" Khloé and Kourtney Kardashian promoted the visual on Instagram following its release, and the former stated: "that is [Jenner] living her best life and being such a star. This is where my mom thrives. She loves to be the center of attention and she's a little ham and I love it." A blooper video featuring Trainor and Jenner performing unchoreographed dances and posing for funny pictures was released on April 21, 2023, in which Trainor describes the shoot as the best day of her life second only to the birth of her son.

The video opens with a title card in all caps and bright lights which reads "Meghan Trainor is literally mother". Jenner appears in a Cult Gaia white silk gown with puff sleeves and a platinum blonde bob, surrounded by dancers in suits who channel a scene from Marilyn Monroe's performance of "Diamonds Are a Girl's Best Friend" (1953). In some scenes, the dancers spin her around and fan her with feathers. Trainor and Jenner appear together in matching floor-length velvet black gowns with gloves by Christian Siriano in subsequent scenes. Trainor shows off sonogram images from her second pregnancy, and Jenner closes the video as she winks while sipping a cup of tea.

Ruth believed the video was "feature-film-quality", and though he initially thought "pop music is dead" upon hearing the song, the video changed his mind: "This is camp to the highest degree. It's Mother at its most narcissistic." Critics praised the fashion choices: Silva and DeSantis described Jenner's look in the white gown as "glam", and Glamour thought it was "the most glamorous incarnation of the trademark Kardashian style". Writing for the GMA Network, Jansen Ramos believed Trainor delivered "one of her most iconic videos yet" and displayed "ultimate Hollywood glam". Billboard's Starr Bowenbank thought its blooper reel looked "just as fun as the final cut".

== Credits and personnel ==
Credits are adapted from the liner notes of Takin' It Back (Deluxe).

- Gian Stone – producer, songwriter, programming, electric guitar, bass
- Justin Trainor – producer, songwriter, engineer, programming
- Meghan Trainor – songwriter, keyboards
- Sean Douglas – songwriter, keyboards
- Pat Ballard – songwriter
- Tristan Hurd – trumpet
- Randy Merrill – mastering
- Jeremie Inhaber – mixing

== Charts ==
Weekly chart performance for "Mother"
Chart (2023–24)	Peak position
Australia (ARIA)	49
Belgium (Ultratop 50 Flanders)	42
Belgium (Ultratop 50 Wallonia)	28
Canada (Canadian Hot 100)	83
Canada CHR/Top 40 (Billboard)	34
Canada Hot AC (Billboard)	47
Global 200 (Billboard)	196
Hungary (Rádiós Top 40)	37
Ireland (IRMA)	23
Japan Hot Overseas (Billboard Japan)	19
Netherlands (Single Tip)	2
New Zealand Hot Singles (RMNZ)	8
South Korea Download (Circle)	167
Suriname (Nationale Top 40)	19
Sweden Heatseeker (Sverigetopplistan)	1
UK Singles (OCC)	22
US Bubbling Under Hot 100 (Billboard)	19
US Adult Pop Airplay (Billboard)	18
US Digital Song Sales (Billboard)	45
US Pop Airplay (Billboard)	21

== Certifications ==
Certifications for "Mother"
Region	Certification	Certified units/sales
Canada (Music Canada)	Gold	40,000^{‡}
United Kingdom (BPI)	Silver	200,000^{‡}
^{‡} Sales+streaming figures based on certification alone.

== Release history ==
Release dates and format(s) for "Mother"
Region	Date	Format(s)	Version	Label	Ref.
United States	March 27, 2023	Hot adult contemporary	Original	Epic	
Italy	April 7, 2023	Radio airplay	Original	Sony	
United States	April 12, 2023	Digital download; streaming	Radio edit	Epic	
United States	May 12, 2023	Digital download; streaming	Remixes	Epic	
