= Keeping Up with the Kardashians season 18 =

Keeping Up with the Kardashians
- Season 18
- No. of episodes: 6

Release
- Original network: E!
- Original release: March 26, 2020

Keeping Up with the Kardashians is an American reality television series that airs on the E! cable network. The show focuses on the personal and professional lives of the Kardashian–Jenner blended family. Its premise originated with Ryan Seacrest, who also serves as an executive producer. The series debuted on October 14, 2007 and has subsequently become one of the longest-running reality television series in the country. The eighteenth season premiered on March 26, 2020.

== Cast ==
=== Main cast ===
- Kim Kardashian
- Kourtney Kardashian
- Khloé Kardashian
- Kendall Jenner
- Kylie Jenner
- Kris Jenner
- Scott Disick
- Kanye West

=== Recurring cast ===
- MJ Shannon
- Corey Gamble
- Larsa Pippen
- Jonathan Cheban
- Malika Haqq
- Mason Disick
- North West

== Development and production ==
On February 25, 2020, it was announced that the season will premiere in March and that for the first time in the history of the series, the screening will be on Thursdays rather than Sundays as has been the case so far.

Due to the 2020 coronavirus pandemic in the United States, the last episode of the season was filmed using mobile phone cameras.

== Episodes ==
| No. overall | No. in season | Title | Original release date | US viewers (millions) |
|---|---|---|---|---|
| 255 | 1 | "Fights, Friendships, And Fashion Week Part 1" | March 26, 2020 | 1.07 |
Kim becomes too friendly with Khloe's ex Tristan Thompson, Khloe must put her foot down and set some boundaries. Kylie prepares to debut her Kylie Cosmetics collaboration with Balmain at Paris Fashion Week, but Kris grows concerned when Kylie becomes too sick to travel. Tension boils over when Kim and Khloe confront Kourtney over her recent attitude, leading to an explosive fight between the sisters.
| 256 | 2 | "Fights, Friendships, and Fashion Week Part 2" | April 2, 2020 | 1.04 |
In the aftermath of their fight, Kim and Kourtney head to Armenia to baptize their kids. Upon realizing that her lifestyle is making her unhappy, Kourtney considers making a major change. Kris is beside herself when she learns that Kylie is too sick to fulfill her work obligations in Paris.
| 257 | 3 | "Date My Daughter" | April 9, 2020 | 0.91 |
When Kris is at a sexual peak in her relationship, she feels guilty Khloe' is going through a dry spell and tries to push her to date again. Scott panics over an upcoming speaking engagement.
| 258 | 4 | "In the Blink of an Eye" | April 16, 2020 | 0.87 |
Khloè wrestles with whether to send her daughter to Cleveland to visit Tristan; Kylie considers undergoing a scary medical procedure; Scott and Khloè plan their next prank on Kris that will top all previous pranks.
| 259 | 5 | "Surprise, Surprise" | April 23, 2020 | 0.80 |
During a whirlwind week of birthdays, Khloe and Kim plan an epic surprise to celebrate Corey; Khloe must choose between freezing her eggs and making embryos with her ex; Kim races against the clock to help an incarcerated man.
| 260 | 6 | "Family Matters" | April 30, 2020 | 0.81 |
When Kim reveals she no longer wants to host the annual Christmas Eve party, the family feuds over holiday plans; Scott struggles to talk about his parents when reunited with a relative from his past; Khloe fills in as Kris' assistant.

== Ratings ==
Viewership and ratings per episode of Keeping Up with the Kardashians season 18
| No. | Title | Air date | Rating/share (18–49) | Viewers (millions) | DVR (18–49) | DVR viewers (millions) | Total (18–49) | Total viewers (millions) |
|---|---|---|---|---|---|---|---|---|
| 1 | "Fights, Friendships, And Fashion Week Part 1" | March 26, 2020 | 0.47 | 1.07 | 0.52 | 0.99 | 1.1 | 2.08 |
| 2 | "Fights, Friendships, And Fashion Week Part 2" | April 2, 2020 | 0.44 | 1.04 | 0.56 | 1.04 | 1.0 | 2.10 |
| 3 | "Date My Daughter" | April 9, 2020 | 0.40 | 0.91 | 0.50 | 1.06 | 0.9 | 1.98 |
| 4 | "In the Blink of an Eye" | April 16, 2020 | 0.38 | 0.87 | 0.41 | 0.70 (+3) | 0.7 | 1.57 |
| 5 | "Surprise, Surprise" | April 23, 2020 | 0.32 | 0.80 | 0.48 | 1.01 | 0.8 | 1.81 |
| 6 | "Family Matters" | April 23, 2020 | 0.32 | 0.81 | 0.39 | 0.7 | 0.7 | 1.55 |
