= Made You Look (Meghan Trainor song) =

2022 single by Meghan Trainor

Single by Meghan Trainor

from the album Takin' It Back
- Released: October 31, 2022
- Genre: Doo-wop
- Length: 2:14
- Label: Epic
- Songwriters: Meghan Trainor; Sean Douglas; Federico Vindver
- Producer: Federico Vindver

Meghan Trainor singles chronology
"Bad for Me" (2022)	"Made You Look" (2022)	"Mother" (2023)

Music video
- "Made You Look" on YouTube

"Made You Look" is a song by the American singer-songwriter Meghan Trainor from her fifth major-label studio album, Takin' It Back (2022). Trainor wrote it with songwriter Sean Douglas and its producer, Federico Vindver. Epic Records released it as the album's second single on October 31, 2022. A doo-wop song, it was inspired by Trainor's insecurities about body image and encourages listeners to embrace their natural beauty and confidence.

Music critics commented on the flirtatious composition of "Made You Look" and compared it to Trainor's past songs. An online dance challenge set to the song became a trend on video-sharing service TikTok in 2022. In the United States, the song peaked at number 11 on the Billboard Hot 100, becoming Trainor's first top-20 single since "Me Too" (2016). The song reached the top of the charts in Poland and the top 10 in Australia, Belgium, Canada, Ireland, New Zealand, Norway, Singapore, the United Kingdom, and Vietnam. Its music video, which premiered on Candy Crush Saga in October 2022, features bright colors and cameos by social media influencers. Trainor performed the song on television shows such as The Today Show, The Tonight Show Starring Jimmy Fallon, and The Drew Barrymore Show, and she included it on the set list of her 2024 concert tour, the Timeless Tour.

== Background and release ==
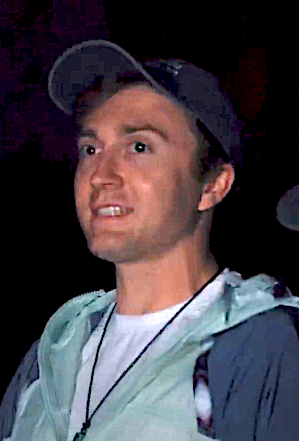
Trainor's husband, Daryl Sabara (pictured in 2022), inspired some lyrics for "Made You Look".

Trainor achieved commercial success with her debut major-label studio album, Title (2015), which produced three top-10 singles on the US Billboard Hot 100. She struggled while creating her third album on a label, Treat Myself (2020), rewriting it four times in an attempt to respond to market shifts in the music industry after the preceding singles underperformed. After the song "Title" attained viral popularity on video-sharing service TikTok in 2021, Trainor announced her intention to pivot to its doo-wop sound on her fifth major-label studio album. She stated that the elevated emotions and strength from her pregnancy helped her build trust in her songwriting instincts. TikTok was highly influential on Trainor's creative process for the album, and she began writing material that would resonate with audiences on it. She gained popularity on the platform while regularly sharing clips and other content with influencer Chris Olsen. Trainor released the single "Bad for Me" in June 2022.

Trainor wrote "Made You Look" alongside songwriter Sean Douglas and its producer, Federico Vindver. As part of an exercise, her therapist asked her to look at herself naked for five minutes. This, along with her body image insecurities after pregnancy, inspired the song. Trainor came up with the lines "I'll make you double take / Soon as I walk away / Call up your chiropractor just in case your neck break", as a reference to how her husband, Daryl Sabara, bends his neck to look at her when she leaves a room. Other lyrics were inspired by the things he does to treat her well. Wanting to create another "self-confident banger that [she] always do[es] on [her] albums", Trainor studied the relatability of her song "All About That Bass" (2014) while writing the track.

"Made You Look" was serviced to hot adult contemporary radio stations in the United States, as the second single from Takin' It Back (2022), on October 31, 2022. The song was sent for radio airplay in Italy on November 18, 2022. On December 9, 2022, its a cappella version, featuring guest vocals from Olsen, Scott Hoying, and influencers Elyse Myers and Sri, was released alongside an accompanying music video. "Made You Look" was supported by a Joel Corry remix on December 31, 2022, and its instrumental and sped-up versions in January 2023. On January 27, the song's remix version featuring Kim Petras was released and serviced for radio airplay in Italy. Petras added new ad libs and high notes during her verse on it. She recorded her vocals in Trainor's home studio, and recalled the experience: "I had 'Made You Look' stuck in my head for months, [...] then when I got asked to jump on it, I was really, really excited. I've never worked with an artist who wanted to track me and comp my vocals and do it all together."

== Composition and lyrics ==
"Made You Look"
"Made You Look", a doo-wop song, features horns in its instrumentation.

"Made You Look" is two minutes and 14 seconds long. Vindver produced, programmed, and engineered the song. He plays the keyboards and percussion, Jesse McGinty plays the baritone saxophone and trombone, and Mike Cordone plays the trumpet. Jeremie Inhaber mixed the song, and Randy Merrill mastered it at Sterling Sound in New York City.

Musically, "Made You Look" is a doo-wop song. Vindver incorporated horns into the song's instrumentation to achieve the style. Along with layered harmonies, it prominently features the bass and brass instruments, which Riff's Piper Westrom thought are reminiscent of the sound of Title. "Made You Look" has a call and response hook; Peter Piatkowski of PopMatters described it as a "spiritual sequel" to "All About That Bass" due to their shared "pouty, surly delivery and the girl group arrangement".

The lyrics of "Made You Look" discuss the theme of self-love; Trainor encourages her female listeners to champion their natural beauty and confidence. She namechecks high-end luxury fashion houses, including Gucci and Louis Vuitton, and insists she looks better donning just her hoodie and "hotter when [her] morning hair's a mess". Trainor declares that onlookers would find her walk jaw-dropping and become obsessed with her once they "get a taste"; she also uses the slang term "14-karat cake" to refer to her backside.

== Critical reception ==
Music critics compared "Made You Look" to Trainor's past songs. AllMusic's Stephen Thomas Erlewine cited the song's inclusion of fashion house names as an example of moments on Takin' It Back where her devotion to bringing back Title's spirit means "that the attitude and melody can occasionally seem preserved in amber". Rolling Stone placed it at number 69 on their list of 2022's best songs, and Tomás Mier positively compared it to Trainor's previous work and praised the "unforgettable lyrics and catchy production".

The flirtatious approach of "Made You Look" was discussed by critics. Martina Inchingolo of the Associated Press thought Trainor sounded "loud[er] and sexier" on the song. Writing for Renowned for Sound, Max Akass believed she displayed a "cheeky, flirty attitude" on it, which made for uncomplicated but efficacious pop music. Mier wrote that Petras delivered a "welcome sexy verse" on her remix of "Made You Look".

== Commercial performance ==
"Made You Look" was Trainor's highest-charting single in years, which some media outlets referred to as a "comeback" for her. The song debuted at number 95 on the US Billboard Hot 100 issued for November 5, 2022. It earned 9.3 millions streams in its second tracking week and entered the Streaming Songs chart at number 49, Trainor's first entry since "Me Too" (2016). It peaked at number 11 on the Billboard Hot 100 and became her first song to enter its top 40 also since "Me Too". "Made You Look" was Trainor's first number-one on the Adult Top 40 chart since "Like I'm Gonna Lose You" (2015). In Canada, "Made You Look" reached number seven on the Canadian Hot 100 and was certified 4× Platinum by Music Canada. The song charted at number two on the UK Singles Chart and became her first top-10 single since "Marvin Gaye" (2015). It received a double Platinum certification in the United Kingdom from the British Phonographic Industry.

In Australia, "Made You Look" peaked at number three and was certified 3× Platinum by the Australian Recording Industry Association. The song reached number two in New Zealand and earned a triple platinum certification from Recorded Music NZ. It became Trainor's first top-10 single on the Billboard Global 200, charting at number six. Elsewhere, "Made You Look" peaked within the top 10, at number two in Singapore, number three in Belgium, Iceland, and Ireland, number five in Vietnam, number six in Latvia, number seven in Norway, and number eight in Malaysia. The song also charted at number 11 in Hungary, number 13 in Croatia and the Netherlands, number 15 in Paraguay, number 16 in Austria, and number 19 in Switzerland. It received a Diamond certification in Brazil, 2× Platinum in Hungary, Platinum in Austria, Denmark, Italy, Norway, Poland, Spain, and Switzerland, and Gold in Belgium, France, Portugal, and Sweden.

== Music video and promotion ==
The music video for "Made You Look" was released on October 20, 2022, exclusive to Candy Crush Saga for 24 hours, followed by a wide release the following day. Trainor stated that she wanted to achieve a superior and more saturated version of the video for "All About That Bass" by employing vivid and ebullient colors in it. It depicts her showing outfits at a press conference, driving in a car, and dancing in a room. Cameos include TikTok influencers Hoying, JoJo Siwa, Drew Afualo, and Olsen as dancers, and Sabara as the car driver. An alternate version of the video featuring only Trainor's dance sequence was later released, titled "Made You Look (Again)".

An online dance challenge choreographed by TikTok users Brookie and Jessie set to "Made You Look" became a trend on the platform, following which around two million user-generated videos also used the song. Trainor promoted the song with appearances on several television shows. On October 21, 2022, she performed "Made You Look" live for the first time on The Today Show. Three days later, Trainor reprised the song on The Tonight Show Starring Jimmy Fallon. She sang it as a medley with "Here Comes Santa Claus" for The Wonderful World of Disney: Magical Holiday Celebration on November 27, 2022. On December 13, 2022, Trainor performed "Made You Look" on The Drew Barrymore Show. She reprised the song during the eighth season of Australian Idol on February 27, 2023. In 2024, Trainor sang it for The Today Show's Citi concert series and Capital's Summertime Ball, and she included it as the last song on the set list of her concert tour, the Timeless Tour, as the encore.

== Credits and personnel ==
Credits are adapted from the liner notes of Takin' It Back.

- Federico Vindver – producer, songwriter, programming, engineering, keyboards, percussion
- Meghan Trainor – songwriter
- Sean Douglas – songwriter
- Jesse McGinty – baritone saxophone, trombone
- Mike Cordone – trumpet
- Randy Merrill – mastering
- Jeremie Inhaber – mixing

== Charts ==
=== Weekly charts ===
Weekly chart performance for "Made You Look"
Chart (2022–2026)	Peak position
Australia (ARIA)	3
Austria (Ö3 Austria Top 40)	16
Belarus Airplay (TopHit)	108
Belgium (Ultratop 50 Flanders)	3
Belgium (Ultratop 50 Wallonia)	7
Canada Hot 100 (Billboard)	7
Canada AC (Billboard)	2
Canada CHR/Top 40 (Billboard)	2
Canada Hot AC (Billboard)	3
CIS Airplay (TopHit)	36
Croatia International Airplay (Top lista)	13
Czech Republic Airplay (ČNS IFPI)	30
Czech Republic Singles Digital (ČNS IFPI)	37
Denmark (Tracklisten)	22
Estonia Airplay (TopHit)	3
Finland Airplay (Radiosoittolista)	58
France (SNEP)	153
Germany (GfK)	26
Global 200 (Billboard)	6
Greece International (IFPI)	35
Hungary (Rádiós Top 40)	28
Hungary (Single Top 40)	11
Hungary (Stream Top 40)	35
Iceland (Tónlistinn)	3
Ireland (IRMA)	3
Italy (FIMI)	59
Japan Hot Overseas (Billboard Japan)	2
Latvia Airplay (LAIPA)	5
Lithuania (AGATA)	35
Luxembourg (Billboard)	23
Malaysia (Billboard)	8
Malaysia International (RIM)	3
Netherlands (Dutch Top 40)	13
Netherlands (Single Top 100)	17
New Zealand (Recorded Music NZ)	2
Nigeria (TurnTable Top 100)	47
Norway (VG-lista)	7
Paraguay (Monitor Latino)	15
Philippines (Billboard)	3
Poland (Polish Airplay Top 100)	1
Poland (Polish Streaming Top 100)	63
Portugal (AFP)	35
Romania Airplay (TopHit)	43
Singapore (RIAS)	2
Slovakia Airplay (ČNS IFPI)	14
Slovakia Singles Digital (ČNS IFPI)	30
South Africa (TOSAC)	22
South Korea (Circle)	75
Spain (PROMUSICAE)	87
Sweden (Sverigetopplistan)	21
Switzerland (Schweizer Hitparade)	19
Turkey International Airplay (Radiomonitor Türkiye)	6
Ukraine Airplay (TopHit)	70
UK Singles (Official Charts)	2
US Billboard Hot 100	11
US Adult Contemporary (Billboard)	9
US Adult Pop Airplay (Billboard)	1
US Dance Airplay (Billboard)	16
US Pop Airplay (Billboard)	5
Venezuela Airplay (Record Report)	54
Vietnam (Vietnam Hot 100)	5

=== Monthly charts ===
Monthly chart performance for "Made You Look"
Chart (2022–2023)	Peak position
CIS Airplay (TopHit)	46
Czech Republic (Rádio – Top 100)	33
Czech Republic (Singles Digitál – Top 100)	47
Estonia Airplay (TopHit)	4
Lithuania Airplay (TopHit)	16
Romania Airplay (TopHit)	48
Slovakia (Rádio – Top 100)	21
Slovakia (Singles Digitál Top 100)	45
South Korea (Circle)	76

=== Year-end charts ===
2022 year-end chart performance for "Made You Look"
Chart (2022)	Position
Belgium (Ultratop Flanders)	178
Netherlands (Dutch Top 40)	99

2023 year-end chart performance for "Made You Look"
Chart (2023)	Position
Australia (ARIA)	38
Belgium (Ultratop Flanders)	25
Belgium (Ultratop Wallonia)	47
Canada (Canadian Hot 100)	16
CIS Airplay (TopHit)	145
Denmark (Tracklisten)	91
Estonia Airplay (TopHit)	51
Global 200 (Billboard)	57
Lithuania Airplay (TopHit)	57
New Zealand (Recorded Music NZ)	39
Poland (Polish Airplay Top 100)	55
UK Singles (OCC)	36
US Billboard Hot 100	53
US Adult Contemporary (Billboard)	14
US Adult Top 40 (Billboard)	8
US Mainstream Top 40 (Billboard)	20

== Certifications ==
Certifications for "Made You Look"
Region	Certification	Certified units/sales
Australia (ARIA)	3× Platinum	210,000^{‡}
Austria (IFPI Austria)	Platinum	30,000^{‡}
Belgium (BRMA)	Gold	20,000^{‡}
Brazil (Pro-Música Brasil)	Diamond	160,000^{‡}
Canada (Music Canada)	4× Platinum	320,000^{‡}
Denmark (IFPI Danmark)	Platinum	90,000^{‡}
France (SNEP)	Gold	100,000^{‡}
Germany (BVMI)	Gold	300,000^{‡}
Hungary (MAHASZ)	2× Platinum	8,000^{‡}
Italy (FIMI)	Platinum	100,000^{‡}
Mexico (AMPROFON)	Platinum	140,000^{‡}
New Zealand (RMNZ)	3× Platinum	90,000^{‡}
Norway (IFPI Norway)	Platinum	60,000^{‡}
Poland (ZPAV)	Platinum	50,000^{‡}
Portugal (AFP)	Gold	5,000^{‡}
Spain (Promusicae)	Platinum	60,000^{‡}
Switzerland (IFPI Switzerland)	Platinum	20,000^{‡}
United Kingdom (BPI)	2× Platinum	1,200,000^{‡}
Streaming
Sweden (GLF)	Gold	4,000,000^{†}
^{‡} Sales+streaming figures based on certification alone.^{†} Streaming-only figures based on certification alone.

== Release history ==
Release dates and format(s) for "Made You Look"
Region	Date	Format(s)	Version	Label	Ref.
United States	October 31, 2022	Hot adult contemporary; Contemporary hit radio	Original	Epic	
Italy	November 18, 2022	Radio airplay	Original	Sony	
Various	December 9, 2022	Digital download; streaming	A cappella	Epic	
Various	December 31, 2022	Digital download; streaming	Joel Corry remix	Epic	
Various	January 12, 2023	Digital download; streaming	Instrumental	Epic	
Various	January 12, 2023	Digital download; streaming	Sped Up	Epic	
Various	January 27, 2023	Digital download; streaming	Kim Petras remix	Epic	
Italy	January 27, 2023	Radio airplay	Kim Petras remix	Sony	
Australia	February 3, 2023	CD single	Original	Epic	
