= Kris (TV series) =

American television talk show

- Genre: Talk show
- Directed by: Miguel Enciso; Manny Rodriguez
- Presented by: Kris Jenner
- Country of origin: United States
- Original language: English
- No. of seasons: 1
- No. of episodes: 10

Production
- Executive producers: Kris Jenner; Robert A. Lifton
- Running time: 42–43 minutes
- Production companies: Monet Lane Productions; Twentieth Television

Original release
- Network: Syndication
- Release: July 15 – August 23, 2013

Kris, also known as Kris Jenner Show, is a former talk show broadcast on the Fox network hosted by Kris Jenner. It premiered on July 15, 2013, on Fox stations in Los Angeles; New York City; Charlotte, North Carolina; Dallas, Texas; Minneapolis, Minnesota; and Phoenix, Arizona. The show finished its six-week trial on August 23, 2013. The show was not picked up for a full season. On January 17, 2014, FOX officially announced that the show had been cancelled.

The show is most notable for having her son-in-law Kanye West as a guest on the final episode, in which he released the first photos of North West, his child with Kim Kardashian. It was Kanye's first television interview in three years and was one hour long. The episode had the highest ratings of the six-week test run.
