= Kris Jenner... and All Things Kardashian =

2011 memoir by television personality Kris Jenner

- Kris Jenner, the author.
- Author: Kris Jenner
- Language: English
- Genre: Memoir
- Publisher: Gallery Books, Karen Hunter Publishing
- Publication date: November 2011
- Publication place: United States
- Pages: 320
- ISBN: 978-1451646979

Kris Jenner... and All Things Kardashian is a 2011 memoir by television personality Kris Jenner. It discusses her friendship with Nicole Brown Simpson, the O. J. Simpson murder trial, and anecdotes about her family.

== Synopsis ==
The book is a memoir of Kris Jenner's life. She details her friendship with the late Nicole Brown Simpson, and the OJ Simpson trial which her ex-husband Robert Kardashian participated in. Jenner also shares personal memories of her children's lives, including daughter Kim's first relationship, first marriage at age 19, Khloe's difficulty in grieving the death of her father, and a 1996 incident in which daughter Kourtney grounded a commercial flight by shouting that there was a bomb on board.

Jenner also revealed an affair she had while married to first husband Robert Kardashian.

== Reception ==
Breia Brissey of Entertainment Weekly reviewed the book favorably, writing "Even as a fan, I was pleasantly surprised with how entertaining the book was." Brissey also noted that nearly half the book focused on Jenner's friendship with Nicole Brown Simpson and the OJ Simpson murder trial. Andrea Sachs of Time Magazine called the book "gossipy" and noted that the memoir featured many stories of Jenner's interactions with other celebrities.
