= Becoming Us =

- Genre: Reality
- Starring: Ben Lehwald; Carly Lehwald; Sallydan Molnar; Danielle Molnar
- Country of origin: United States
- Original language: English
- No. of seasons: 1
- No. of episodes: 10

Production
- Executive producers: Ryan Seacrest; Eugene Young; Rabih Gholam; George Moll; Jennifer J. Duncan; Paul Barrosse
- Production companies: Ryan Seacrest Productions; Three Sisters Inc.

Original release
- Network: ABC Family
- Release: June 8 – August 10, 2015

Becoming Us is an American reality television series about a family with a transgender parent. It aired from June 8, 2015, to August 10, 2015, on ABC Family. The series centered on the Lehwald family of Evanston, Illinois, whose father has recently come out as a trans woman. The show also followed Ben's girlfriend Danielle's family because her dad is also transgender. Ryan Seacrest, Eugene Young, Rabih Gholam, Jennifer J. Duncan, and George Moll produced the show for Ryan Seacrest Productions, as well as Paul Barosse.

== Episodes ==
| No. | Title | Original release date | US viewers (millions) |
|---|---|---|---|
| 1 | "#WelcomeToMyWorld" | June 8, 2015 | 0.64 |
| 2 | "#FallOutBoy" | June 15, 2015 | 0.41 |
| 3 | "#IntotheWild" | June 22, 2015 | 0.30 |
| 4 | "#Heart2Heart" | June 29, 2015 | 0.36 |
| 5 | "#RulesOfEngagement" | July 6, 2015 | 0.23 |
| 6 | "#LoveHurts" | July 13, 2015 | 0.23 |
| 7 | "#TheLetter" | July 20, 2015 | 0.15 |
| 8 | "#AlltheTrimmings" | July 27, 2015 | 0.23 |
| 9 | "#Blindsided" | August 3, 2015 | 0.22 |
| 10 | "EveryPictureTellsaStory" | August 10, 2015 | 0.20 |

== See also ==
- I Am Cait (2015)
- I Am Jazz (2015)
- Transparent (2014)
- Media portrayals of transgender people
