= Bad for Me (Meghan Trainor song) =

Single by Meghan Trainor featuring Teddy Swims

from the album Takin' It Back
- Released: June 24, 2022
- Genre: Pop
- Length: 3:33
- Label: Epic
- Songwriters: Meghan Trainor; Stephen Wrabel; Ajay Bhattacharyya; Federico Vindver
- Producer: Federico Vindver

Meghan Trainor singles chronology
"Rockin' Around the Christmas Tree" (2021)	"Bad for Me" (2022)	"Made You Look" (2022)

Teddy Swims singles chronology
"Dose" (2022)	"Bad for Me" (2022)	"Better" (2022)

Music video
- "Bad for Me" on YouTube

"Bad for Me" is a song by American singer-songwriter Meghan Trainor, featuring fellow American singer-songwriter Teddy Swims. It was written by the former alongside Wrabel, Stint, and producer Federico Vindver. The song was released on June 24, 2022, as the lead single from her fifth major-label studio album, Takin' It Back (2022). A pop song with gospel influences, it has lyrics about a toxic relationship with a family member and distancing oneself from them.

"Bad for Me" received generally positive reviews from music critics, who praised its meaningful lyricism and wordplay. The song reached number 15 on the Adult Top 40 chart and number 25 on the Adult Contemporary chart in the United States, and entered digital sales charts in Canada and the United Kingdom. Thom Kerr directed its music video, which depicts Trainor and Swims navigating an illusory set of flowers interspersed with panoramic imagery. They performed the song on television shows in 2022, including Jimmy Kimmel Live! and The Late Late Show with James Corden.

== Background ==
Meghan Trainor released two major-label studio albums in 2020: her third, Treat Myself, and her fourth, A Very Trainor Christmas. She struggled while creating the former, rewriting it four times since she was "adapting to what's going on in the music industry" after its preceding singles underperformed. After Trainor's 2014 song "Title" attained viral popularity on video-sharing service TikTok in 2021, she announced her intention to pivot to the doo-wop sound of its 2015 parent album of the same name on her fifth one in May 2022, along with her pregnancy's influence on it. In June 2022, she began teasing a song titled "Bad for Me" as the lead single from the album. Trainor revealed that it is about a toxic relationship, along with the lyrics "Please don't make promises that you can't keep/ Your best intentions end up hurting me/ No matter what, I love you endlessly". She appeared without makeup in the teaser, which Portal Popline's Leonardo Rocha interpreted as emblematic of the lyrics's sincerity.

"Bad for Me" was released as a single on June 24, 2022, and features American singer-songwriter Teddy Swims. Three days later, Epic Records serviced the song to hot adult contemporary radio stations in the United States. An acoustic version, and an EP featuring remixes of it by JTrain, Disco Lines, and Zookëper, were released in August 2022.

== Composition and lyrics ==
"Bad for Me" is three minutes and 33 seconds long. Federico Vindver produced, programmed, and engineered the song. He plays the keyboards, guitar, bass, and piano. Jeremie Inhaber mixed it, and Randy Merrill mastered the song at Sterling Sound in New York City. Trainor co-wrote it with Ajay Bhattacharyya and Stephen Wrabel, strangers to her at the time.

Musically, "Bad for Me" is a pop song with gospel influences; People's Jeff Nelson characterized it as "sad-girl pop". The song's instrumentation incorporates a piano and an acoustic six-string guitar. It is about a personal situation Trainor experienced. She stated: "Toxic relationships can be in your family and you can step away from them and it sucks. But it's doable." That night, Daryl Sabara suggested that the song is the right one for Trainor to record as a duet with Swims, who she had wished to collaborate with for a long time. Swims, friends with Bhattacharyya and Wrabel, responded to the proposition: "I would be honored to be part of this", and they recorded it in Trainor's home studio the following week. She considered "Bad for Me" more personal than her other songs as it involved another person; she refused to name the subject, but dispelled the idea it is about her brother Ryan.

== Reception ==
Jacob Uitti of American Songwriter included "Bad for Me" in the magazine's weekly rundown of the best new releases in music: "[The song] ... is a powerful pop masterpiece from the standout songwriter." He added that the song "showcases her knack for lyricism and wordplay and offers yet another reason why she's one of the most sought-after pop artists of the 2020s". PopMatters's Peter Piatkowski cited it as an example of tracks on Takin' It Back (2022) where Trainor delves inside her "resourceful pool of talent" to create something more meaningful: "[It] is a stirring and moving gospel hymn that is a pop masterpiece." He also complimented her vocal chemistry with Swims and its contused lyrics. Writing for Riff, Piper Westrom thought "Bad for Me" was the strongest track on the album, and deviated from what is expected from Trainor, offering a perspective "different from the traditional toxic romantic relationship angle". Stereogum's Rachel Brodsky criticized the song in her review: "I find [Trainor] cringe and cloying on just about every level", and was also negative about Trainor's comment in an interview that it was her "Adele moment".

Commercially, "Bad for Me" reached number 25 on the US Billboard Adult Contemporary chart and number 15 on the US Adult Top 40. The song debuted at number 13 on the Digital Song Sales chart. It peaked at number 32 on the Canada Digital Song Sales chart. "Bad for Me" charted at number 19 on the New Zealand Hot Singles chart and received a gold certification from Recorded Music NZ. The song reached number 57 on the UK Singles Downloads Chart and number 59 on Singles Sales.

== Promotion ==
Thom Kerr directed the music video for "Bad for Me", which premiered the same day as the song. In the video, Trainor and Swims navigate an illusory set of flowers interspersed with panoramic imagery; American Songwriter's Tina Benitez-Eves interpreted it as an illustration of the song's lyrics about dissociating from toxic relationships.

Trainor first performed "Bad for Me" live with Swims at Jimmy Kimmel Live! on June 24, 2022. On August 24, 2022, they reprised the song on The Late Late Show with James Corden. Trainor sang it on Today on October 21, 2022.

== Credits and personnel ==
Credits are adapted from the liner notes of Takin' It Back.

- Federico Vindver – producer, songwriter, programming, engineering, keyboards, guitar, bass, piano
- Meghan Trainor – songwriter
- Ajay Bhattacharyya – songwriter
- Stephen Wrabel – songwriter
- Randy Merrill – mastering
- Jeremie Inhaber – mixing

== Charts ==
Chart positions for "Bad for Me"
Chart (2022)	Peak position
Canada Digital Song Sales (Billboard)	32
New Zealand Hot Singles (RMNZ)	19
UK Singles Downloads (OCC)	57
UK Singles Sales (OCC)	59
US Adult Contemporary (Billboard)	25
US Adult Pop Airplay (Billboard)	15
US Digital Song Sales (Billboard)	13

== Certification ==
Certification for "Bad for Me"
Region	Certification	Certified units/sales
New Zealand (RMNZ)	Gold	15,000^{‡}
^{‡} Sales+streaming figures based on certification alone.

== Release history ==
Release dates and format(s) for "Bad for Me"
Region	Date	Format(s)	Version	Label	Ref.
Various	June 24, 2022	Digital download; streaming	Original	Epic	
United States	June 27, 2022	Hot adult contemporary	Original	Epic	
Various	August 15, 2022	Digital download; streaming	Acoustic	Epic	
Various	August 26, 2022	Digital download; streaming	Remixes	Epic	
