= I Am Jazz =

American reality TV series (2015–2023)

- Also known as: All That Jazz
- Genre: Reality
- Starring: Jazz Jennings
- Country of origin: United States
- Original language: English
- No. of seasons: 8
- No. of episodes: 73

Production
- Executive producers: Aengus James; Colin King Miller; David St. John; Shanta Mays
- Producers: Taylor Garbutt; Jared Goode
- Production locations: Coral Springs, Florida, United States
- Editor: Eric Johannsen
- Camera setup: Multi-camera
- Running time: 43 minutes
- Production company: This Is Just a Test

Original release
- Network: TLC
- Release: July 15, 2015 – February 28, 2023

I Am Jazz is a reality television series on TLC about Jazz Jennings, an American transgender woman and YouTuber. The series features Jazz and her family "dealing with typical teen drama through the lens of a transgender youth." I Am Jazz premiered on July 15, 2015.

== Synopsis ==
Jazz Jennings, a South Florida teen, was assigned male at birth. Aged 4, Jennings was diagnosed with gender dysphoria in childhood, making her one of the youngest publicly documented people to be identified as gender dysphoric. Her parents, Greg and Jeanette, decided to support her female gender identity by her fifth birthday. Jazz has been in the spotlight since 2007, when at age 6, she was interviewed by Barbara Walters to discuss her gender identity. She participated in follow-up interviews, launched a foundation, and co-wrote a book, also called I Am Jazz. She has also posted videos about her life on YouTube.

I Am Jazz focuses on the day-to-day lives of the "Jennings" family (the surname "Jennings" is a pseudonym, and any reference to the family's exact location is obscured). Jazz, who was about to enter high school when the series started in 2015, grapples with the usual teen angst in addition to her own challenges as a transgender girl. Her family, which includes her three siblings, parents and grandparents, also talk about their experiences.

== Episodes ==
=== Series overview ===
Season	Episodes	Originally released	
Season	Episodes	First released	Last released
1	11	July 15, 2015	August 26, 2015
2	8	June 8, 2016	July 27, 2016
3	8	June 27, 2017	August 9, 2017
4	8	January 2, 2018	February 20, 2018
5	12	January 1, 2019	March 19, 2019
6	8	January 28, 2020	March 17, 2020
7	12	November 16, 2021	February 1, 2022
8	6	January 24, 2023	February 28, 2023

=== Season 1 (2015) ===
No. overall	No. in season	Title	Original release date	U.S. viewers (millions)
1	1	"All About Jazz"	July 15, 2015	1.36
One-hour series premiere. Jazz's family talks about Jazz's life, her insistence from an early age that she was a girl, and the struggles and confusion they faced. Jazz goes bathing suit shopping with Ari and struggles to find a flattering suit; Jazz talks with her brothers about her insecurities over her body. Jazz's maternal grandparents stop by and talk about their shock when they learned Jazz was transgender. Jazz and Jeanette visit the doctor to discuss results of Jazz's hormone tests.
2	2	"Boys Aren't Nice to Her"	July 22, 2015	1.02
Ari is coming back from college for the summer, so the twins have to go back to sharing a room; their parents let them and Jazz redecorate their rooms. Jazz feels her room is too girly and needs to match her age. Jeanette is emotional about Jazz growing up and no longer being her "baby." Jazz and her friends host a coed bowling night, but few boys come. She is hurt when she finds out one boy refused to come because she is transgender. Jazz talks about facing rejection as friends start dating, especially the ways boys regularly interact with her friends but ignore her. Jeanette is very worried about the social situations Jazz will face in high school.
3	3	"High School Is Wild Fire"	July 22, 2015	1.08
An accomplished soccer player, Jazz attends a soccer conditioning clinic in preparation for high school. Her parents and coach discuss whether she should try out for the varsity or junior varsity squad when she enters high school. Greg stresses that he just wants Jazz to be happy. Jeanette worries that Jazz, who was barred from playing in the girls' league for several years, is scarred from the experience.
4	4	"I Thought It Was a Choice"	July 29, 2015	0.911
5	5	"Am I Doing the Right Thing?"	July 29, 2015	0.886
6	6	"Happy Mother's Day!"	August 5, 2015	0.870
7	7	"I'm Ready to Explore Boys"	August 5, 2015	0.897
8	8	"So the Dad is Now Mom?"	August 12, 2015	0.766
9	9	"We Don't Read the Comments"	August 12, 2015	0.690
10	10	"Baby Jazz Is Growing Up"	August 19, 2015	0.698
11	11	"The Family Tells All"	August 26, 2015	0.780

=== Season 2 (2016) ===
No. overall	No. in season	Title	Original release date	U.S. viewers (millions)
12	1	"The Hate is Real"	June 8, 2016	1.048
13	2	"I Looked Like a Man in a Dress"	June 15, 2016	0.971
14	3	"It's Either Surgery or Male Puberty"	June 22, 2016	0.987
15	4	"Your Body May Be Rejecting the Implant"	June 29, 2016	1.334
16	5	"Confronted with Hate"	July 6, 2016	1.181
17	6	"She's Too Young for Breast Surgery"	July 13, 2016	0.996
18	7	"We Scare Most Boys"	July 20, 2016	1.022
19	8	"Teenage Angst and Broken Hearts"	July 27, 2016	1.110

=== Season 3 (2017) ===
No. overall	No. in season	Title	Original release date	U.S. viewers (millions)
20	1	"Bottoms Up"	June 27, 2017	1.386
21	2	"Double Trouble"	June 28, 2017	0.942
22	3	"Getting to the Bottom of It"	July 5, 2017	0.886
23	4	"Sweet Sixteen"	July 12, 2017	0.982
24	5	"Dating in the Dark"	July 19, 2017	0.759
25	6	"Face Your Demons"	July 26, 2017	0.832
26	7	"Dating in the Light"	August 2, 2017	0.863
27	8	"In the Line of Fire"	August 9, 2017	0.850
Jazz and her family travel to San Francisco for a final consultation. Meanwhile, Jazz prepares for her first debate style-interview with conservative commentator, Tomi Lahren.

=== Season 4 (2018) ===
No. overall	No. in season	Title	Original release date	U.S. viewers (millions)
28	1	"Winds of Change"	January 2, 2018	1.118
29	2	"Weighty Issues"	January 9, 2018	0.855
30	3	"Resisting Temptation"	January 16, 2018	0.821
31	4	"Big Trouble in the Big Apple"	January 23, 2018	0.778
32	5	"Trans Girl Meets Girl"	January 30, 2018	0.835
33	6	"Pizza Rolls, Gender Roles, and Jazz Rolls"	February 6, 2018	0.849
34	7	"Hungry for Acceptance"	February 13, 2018	0.740
35	8	"Nothing Is Set in Stone"	February 20, 2018	0.818

=== Season 5 (2019) ===
No. overall	No. in season	Title	Original release date	U.S. viewers (millions)
36	1	"The Final Countdown"	January 1, 2019	0.789
37	2	"Scared & Unprepared"	January 8, 2019	0.707
38	3	"Caterpillar to Butterfly"	January 15, 2019	0.759
39	4	"Rebirth"	January 22, 2019	1.148
40	5	"It's A Girl!"	January 29, 2019	1.272
41	6	"Operation Complication"	February 5, 2019	1.245
42	7	"Your Girl Jazz Has A Boyfriend!"	February 12, 2019	1.077
43	8	"Missing In Action"	February 19, 2019	1.084
44	9	"I Want To Meet Your(Transphobic) Mom"	February 26, 2019	1.070
45	10	"Enemy In The Family"	March 5, 2019	1.141
46	11	"Reevaluation Realness"	March 12, 2019	0.883
47	12	"Up In The Air..."	March 19, 2019	1.052

=== Season 6 (2020) ===
No. overall	No. in season	Title	Original release date	U.S. viewers (millions)
48	1	"I Will Survive"	January 28, 2020	0.82
49	2	"Ex-Factor"	February 4, 2020	1.01
50	3	"Born This Way"	February 11, 2020	0.76
Jazz struggles to decide between attending Pomona College and Harvard College.
51	4	"I'm Still Standing"	February 18, 2020	0.82
52	5	"Communications Breakdown"	February 25, 2020	0.75
53	6	"Draglicious"	March 3, 2020	0.82
54	7	"Under Pressure"	March 10, 2020	0.76
55	8	"Somewhere Over the Rainbow"	March 17, 2020	0.75

=== Season 7 (2021–2022) ===
No. overall	No. in season	Title	Original release date	U.S. viewers (millions)
56	1	"Through the Years: Part 1"	November 16, 2021	N/A
57	2	"Through the Years: Part 2"	November 23, 2021	N/A
58	3	"My 234-lb Life"	November 30, 2021	1.04
59	4	"Blast From the Past"	December 7, 2021	0.73
60	5	"Breaking the Cycle"	December 14, 2021	0.78
61	6	"Private Parts"	December 21, 2021	0.67
62	7	"Raw"	December 28, 2021	0.84
63	8	"Wake Up Call"	January 4, 2022	0.84
64	9	"Smashed"	January 11, 2022	0.80
65	10	"A Long Time in the Making"	January 18, 2022	0.82
66	11	"Heating Up"	January 25, 2022	0.72
67	12	"Not the Same Jazz"	February 1, 2022	0.74

=== Season 8 (2023) ===
No. overall	No. in season	Title	Original release date	U.S. viewers (millions)
68	1	"A Night at the Selfie Museum"	January 24, 2023	0.63
69	2	"Mommy Dearest"	January 31, 2023	0.62
70	3	"These Boots Are Made for Walkin'"	February 7, 2023	0.54
71	4	"Clavicles Are the New Black"	February 14, 2023	0.51
72	5	"GOAT"	February 21, 2023	0.61
73	6	"Back to School"	February 28, 2023	0.59

== Production ==
The 11-part series involved filming five days a week, including both days on the weekend. The series was initially called All That Jazz, but was retitled to I Am Jazz. The show takes its title from a 2011 documentary, I Am Jazz: A Family in Transition, that aired on the Oprah Winfrey Network.

The one-hour series premiere of I Am Jazz first aired at the same time Caitlyn Jenner was giving her acceptance speech for the Arthur Ashe Courage Award at the 2015 ESPY Awards on ABC.

On March 28, 2019, TLC renewed the series for a sixth season, which premiered on January 28, 2020. In June 2021, TLC renewed the series for a seventh season, with filming commencing the same month.

== Broadcast ==
Internationally, the series premiered in Australia on TLC on December 10, 2015.

== Reception ==
Critic Brian Lowry of Variety praised I Am Jazz, calling it a "sensitively constructed series (in an admirable departure for the attention-seeking network)... Simply told and heartfelt, the show should add a welcome dimension to the education process, capturing the challenges associated with sexual identity at such a vulnerable age." James Poniewozik, in his review for Time magazine, stated that the reality show airing on the same network that recently pulled 19 Kids and Counting off the air feels like a "change of an era." Poniewozik writes, "I Am Jazz is an engaging story of a teen girl who has transitioned. But it is also the story of everyone else, transitioning." Marc Silver of The Washington Post wrote about the boom of transgender-theme shows on TV, including Jenner's upcoming reality show, I Am Cait: "I Am Cait will surely attract more viewers because of Jenner's fame. It's too soon to say how Jazz will fare. But, with her humor and honesty, she's a tough act for Caitlyn Jenner to follow."

=== Awards ===
The show tied for best Outstanding Reality Program at the 27th annual GLAAD Media Awards.

Reality TV Award for Best Docu-series 2020.

== See also ==
- Becoming Us
- I Am Cait
- Media portrayals of transgender people
