= Jennifer Finney Boylan =

American author (born 1958)

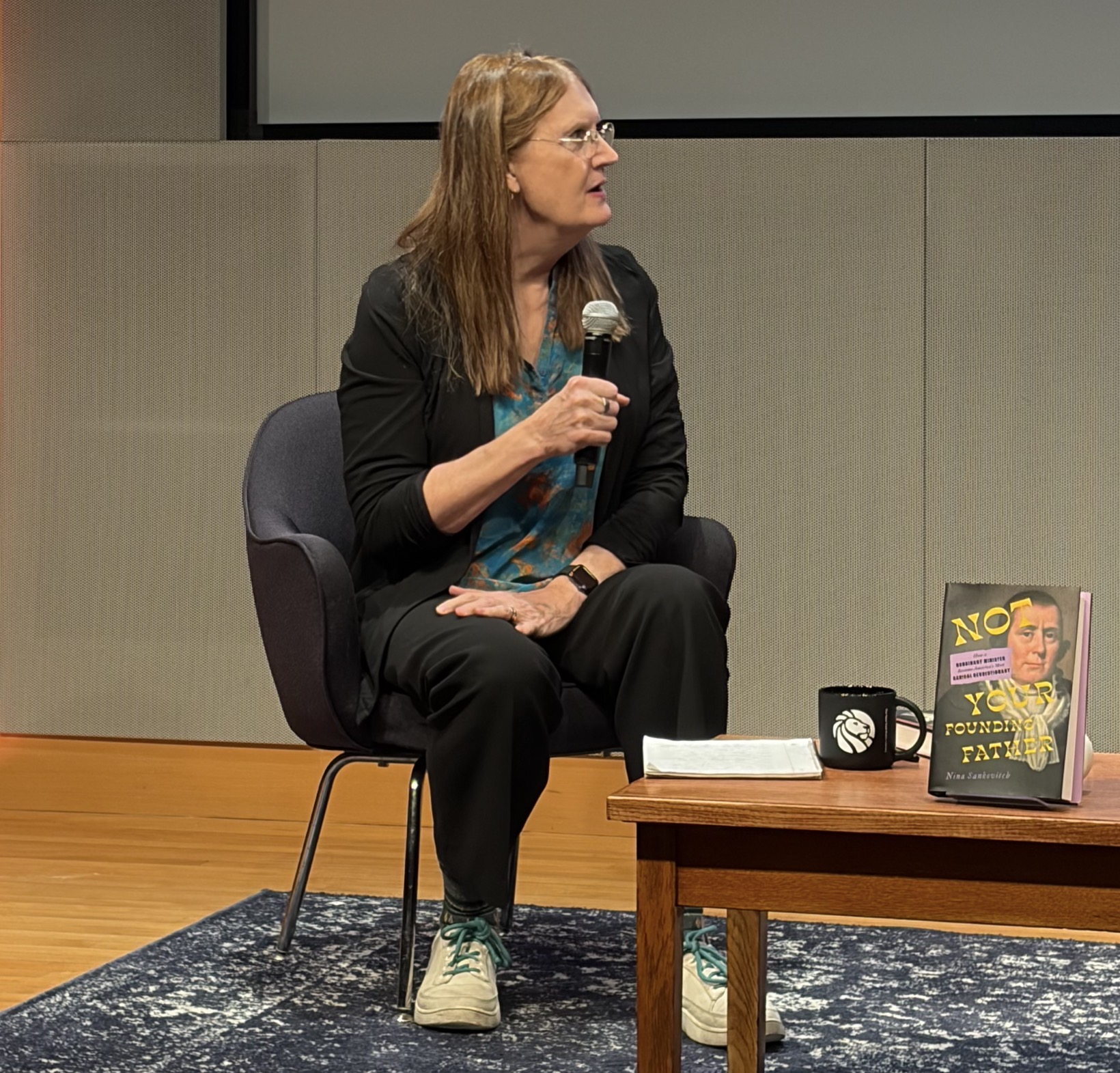
- Jennifer Finney Boylan interviewing author Nina Sankovitch about a biography of Public Universal Friend, February 4, 2026, at the New York Public Library Main Branch
- Born: June 22, 1958 (age 68); Valley Forge, Pennsylvania, U.S.
- Education: Wesleyan University (BA); Johns Hopkins University (MFA)
- Occupations: Author; activist; professor; television personality
- Known for: Transgender activism
- Spouse: Deirdre Boylan (m. 1988)
- Children: 2
- Awards: Lambda Literary Award for Transgender Literature (2004, 2026)
- Website: jenniferboylan.net

Jennifer Finney Boylan (born June 22, 1958) is an American author, transgender activist, professor at Barnard College, and a former contributing opinion writer for the New York Times. In December 2023, she became the president of PEN America, having previously been the vice president.

== Early life and education ==
Boylan was born on June 22, 1958, in Valley Forge, Pennsylvania, and graduated from The Haverford School, a private college-preparatory school in Haverford, Pennsylvania, in 1976. She graduated from Wesleyan University in 1980, then completed graduate work in English at Johns Hopkins University.

== Career ==
Boylan was on the faculty of Colby College from 1988 to 2014. In 2000, she was named "Professor of the Year" at Colby College. She moved to Barnard in 2014, where she is both Professor of English and Anna Quindlen Writer-in-Residence.

Boylan has written 19 books, including novels, collections of short stories, and her memoir. Her 2003 memoir, She's Not There: A Life in Two Genders, was the first book published by an openly transgender American to become a bestseller. It was described by The Advocate as "a seminal piece of the trans literary canon". It also won the 2004 Lambda Literary Award for Transgender Literature.

Her memoir Good Boy: My Life in Seven Dogs was published on April 21, 2020, by Celadon Books.

In October 2022, she published Mad Honey, a novel co-written with New York Times bestselling author Jodi Picoult.

She was a Contributing Opinion Writer in The New York Times from October 2007 to April 2022.

In 2013, Boylan was chosen as the first openly transgender co-chair of GLAAD's National Board of Directors. She also serves on the Policy Advisory Board of Gender Rights Maryland and the Board of Trustees of the Kinsey Institute for Research on Sex, Gender, and Reproduction.

Boylan's 2025 book, Cleavage: Men, Women, and the Space Between Us, won the 2026 Lambda Literary Award for Transgender Literature.

== Public life ==
Boylan has spoken on numerous college campuses, including Harvard, Yale, Cornell, Columbia, and Barnard. She has made appearances via a variety of media outlets to discuss her life, books, and activism. She has appeared on The Oprah Winfrey Show, Larry King Live, The Today Show, 48 Hours, and NPR. She made an appearance on 20/20 on April 24, 2015, after Caitlyn Jenner came out as trans, and regularly appeared on screen and as a consultant on Jenner's reality show I Am Cait.

Based on the text of the appeal, she signed "A Letter on Justice and Open Debate" which appeared on the Harper's Magazine website on 7 July 2020, including many high-profile names, some with controversial positions on human sexuality within the trans community, such as J. K. Rowling. On discovering the names of the other signatories post-publication, Boylan retracted her signature.

On NPR's news quiz program Wait, Wait, Don't Tell Me!, Boylan achieved a perfect score when tested about hot dogs.

== Personal life ==
Boylan has two children, Zaira and Sean, with Deirdre Boylan, whom she married in 1988.

Boylan is a trans woman, and began transitioning in 2000. In 2019, she told the LGBTQ&A podcast, "I've been maybe three or four different women at this point in my life. Early on in transition, I was very youthful. I cared a lot about my appearance and being sexy and my clothes. Fashion was really important to me, passing was really important to me. Appearing cis, I'm sorry to say, was probably more important to me than it should have been.... It's the spectacular mystery of life, the way we keep becoming other versions of ourselves." In the essay "Penis Envy", Boylan describes her feelings as a young man who considered herself female, writing, "We [change sex] because nature demands it".

She lives with her wife in New York City and Belgrade Lakes, Maine. Nine years after she began her transition, Boylan published an opinion piece for The New York Times stating that she married her spouse before she began her transition, and her spouse "stood by me, deciding that her life was better with me than without me.... What matters is that my spouse and I love each other, and that our legal union has been a good thing — for us, for our children and our community".

Boylan plays keyboard instruments as well as the zither, and describes playing in various bands in her memoir.

== Awards and honors ==
In June 2020, in honor of the 50th anniversary of the first LGBTQ Pride parade, Queerty named her among the fifty heroes "leading the nation toward equality, acceptance, and dignity for all people".

Boylan was also awarded a master's degree ad eundem gradum from Colby College.

== Bibliography ==
- Remind Me to Murder You Later (1988) ISBN 0-8018-3728-6
- The Planets (April 15, 1991) ISBN 978-0671727154
- The Constellations: A Novel (November 8, 1994) ISBN 978-0679430216
- Getting In (September 1, 1998) ISBN 978-0446674171
- The Black Book: Diary of a Teenage Stud series under the pseudonym Jonah Black (2001–2002)
- She's Not There: A Life in Two Genders (July 29, 2003) ISBN 978-0767914048
- I'm Looking Through You: Growing Up Haunted: A Memoir (January 15, 2008) ISBN 978-0767921749
- Falcon Quinn and the Black Mirror (May 11, 2010) ISBN 978-0061728327
- Falcon Quinn and the Crimson Vapor (May 10, 2011) ISBN 978-0061728358
- Stuck in the Middle with You: A Memoir of Parenting in Three Genders (April 30, 2013) ISBN 978-0767921763
- Trans Bodies, Trans Selves: A Resource for the Transgender Community (June 10, 2014) ISBN 978-0199325351
- You Are You (May 12, 2015) ISBN 978-3868285406
- Falcon Quinn and the Bullies of Greenblud (September 16, 2016)
- Long Black Veil (April 11, 2017) ISBN 978-0451496324
- Good Boy: My Life in Seven Dogs (April 21, 2020) ISBN 978-1250261861
- Mad Honey with Jodi Picoult (October 4, 2022) ISBN 978-0735276932
- Cleavage: Men, Women, and the Space Between Us (February 4, 2025) ISBN 978-1250261885

=== Anthologies ===
- Sexual Metamorphosis: An Anthology of Transsexual Memoirs (April 12, 2005) ISBN 978-1400030149
- The Book of Dads: Essays on the Joys, Perils, and Humiliations of Fatherhood (May 12, 2009) ISBN 978-0061711558
- Love Is a Four-Letter Word: True Stories of Breakups, Bad Relationships, and Broken Hearts (July 28, 2009) ISBN 978-0452295506
- How Beautiful the Ordinary (October 6, 2009) ISBN 978-0061154980
- It Gets Better (March 22, 2011) ISBN 978-0525952336
- Truth & Dare: 20 Tales of Heartbreak and Happiness (April 26, 2011) ISBN 978-0762441044

== See also ==
- LGBT culture in New York City
- List of LGBT people from New York City
- NYC Pride March
