= Chandi Moore =

American HIV/AIDS and LGBT rights activist

Chandi Moore is an American health education specialist, transgender rights activist, HIV/AIDS activist, and reality television personality. Moore was a former cast member of the documentary series I Am Cait and works as the Health Education Associate at Children's Hospital Los Angeles.

== Career ==
Moore works as the Health Education Associate at Children's Hospital Los Angeles and works within the hospital's Center for Trans Youth and Development. As a health educator, she advocates for transgender and gender-non conforming people to receive proper testing and care for HIV/AIDS. Moore leads a trans youth-specific program called Brave Leaders Unified to Strengthen Our Health.

Moore previously served as co-chair for the Transgender Service Providers Network. In 2015, she was named one of Top 25 Trans Pioneers by The Advocate. In 2015, Moore also worked with the Centers for Disease Control and Prevention for their Act against AIDS initiative campaign Doing It, encouraging community members to get tested for HIV.

Moore is a recipient of the 2015 Positive Images Statement of Courage Award and the 2018 Better Brothers Los Angeles Advocate Award.

In 2016, Moore was a regular Cast member of the American documentary television series I Am Cait, which followed the life of former Olympian Caitlyn Jenner after she came out as a transgender woman. She partnered with Jenner to make a video about Transgender Day of Remembrance.

In 2022, Moore was one of the transgender activists who took the stage with Lizzo at the 48th People's Choice Awards.

== Personal life ==
Moore is from Los Angeles, California. She is a transgender woman.
