= Kris Jenner =

American media personality (born 1955)

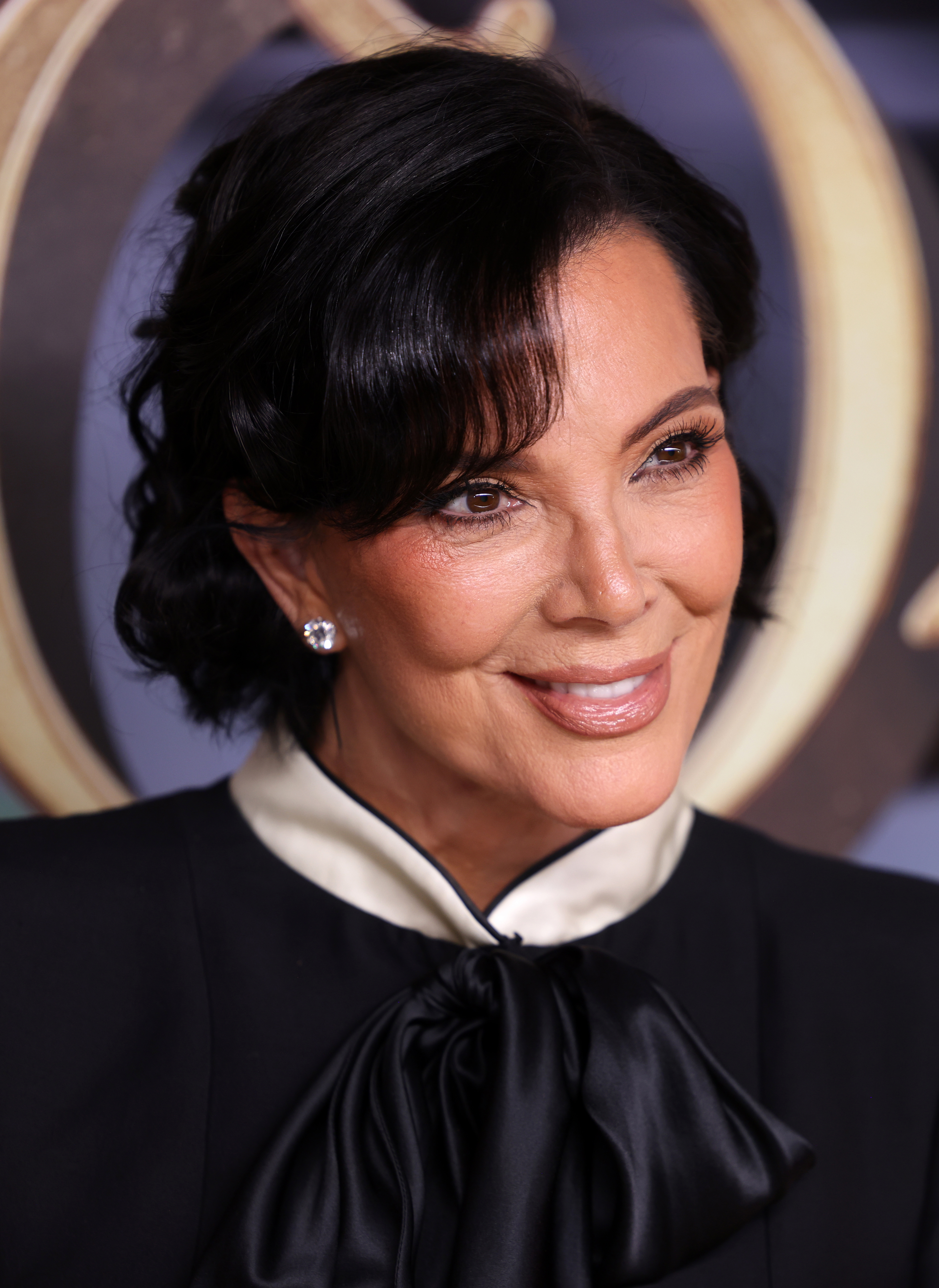
- Jenner in 2025
- Born: Kristen Mary Houghton; November 5, 1955 (age 71); San Diego, California, U.S.
- Other names: Kris Houghton; Kris Kardashian
- Occupations: Media personality; socialite; businesswoman; producer
- Years active: 2007–present
- Television: Keeping Up with the Kardashians; The Kardashians
- Spouses: Robert Kardashian (m. 1978; div. 1991); Bruce Jenner (m. 1991; div. 2015)
- Partner: Corey Gamble (2014–present)
- Children: Kourtney; Kim; Khloé; Rob; Kendall; Kylie
- Parent(s): Robert True Houghton; Mary Jo Campbell
- Family: Kardashian

Kristen Mary Jenner (née Houghton /ˈhoʊtən/ HOH-tən, formerly Kardashian; born November 5, 1955) is an American media personality, socialite, and businesswoman. She rose to fame starring in the reality television series Keeping Up with the Kardashians (2007–2021) with her family. The success of their show led her and her family to star in multiple spin-off series, including Kourtney and Khloe Take Miami (2009), Kourtney and Kim Take New York (2011), Khloe & Lamar (2011), Rob & Chyna (2016) and Life of Kylie (2017). She acted as executive producer for most of her family's reality programs. In 2013, she hosted a six week long pop culture-driven daytime talk show, called Kris. Following her family's decision to sign off from E! in 2021, they then went on to star in The Kardashians on Hulu from 2022.

She has four children from her first marriage to lawyer Robert Kardashian: Kourtney, Kim, Khloé and Robert, and two children from her second marriage to television personality and retired Olympic Games medalist Bruce Jenner (who transitioned to Caitlyn): Kendall and Kylie. She has 13 grandchildren, including the musician North West.

== Early life ==
Kristen Mary Houghton was born in San Diego, California, on November 5, 1955, the elder of two children born to Mary Jo "M. J." Shannon (1934–2026; née Campbell), who owned a children's clothing store, and Robert True "Bob" Houghton (1931–1975), an engineer. When she was seven years old, M. J. and Bob divorced, and she and her younger sister, Karen Casey (née Houghton), were raised by their mother. M. J. eventually remarried to businessman Harry Shannon, who helped raise Jenner and her sister. By her mother's marriage to Harry, she gained a stepbrother, Steven "Steve" Shannon.

Three months after moving to Oxnard, California, Shannon's business partner allegedly left with all the company's capital, so the family moved back to San Diego. In San Diego, Jenner worked at Shannon & Company, a children's clothing store that belonged to her mother. Jenner attended Clairemont High School and graduated in 1973. In 1975, when Jenner was 19, her father died in a car crash in Mexico. She worked for American Airlines as a flight attendant for a year in 1976.

== Career ==
=== Television ===
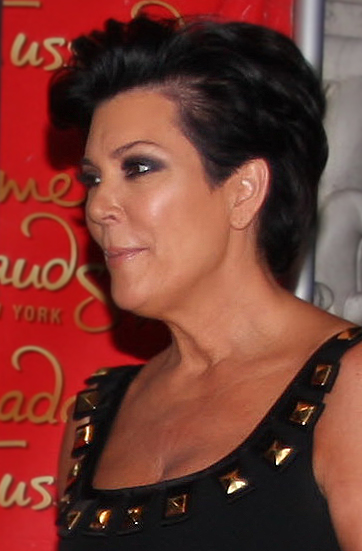
Jenner in 2010

Jenner met with Ryan Seacrest in 2007 to pursue a reality television show based on her family. Seacrest, who had his own production company, decided to develop the idea, having the popular family-based show The Osbournes in his mind. Jenner further commented on the possible series:

Like, there's the little girls, and there's the older girls, and then there's my son. [...] Everybody thinks that they could create a bunch of drama in their lives, but it's something that I felt I didn't even have to think about. It would be natural.

The show eventually was picked up to air on the E! cable network, with Jenner acting as the executive producer. The series focused on the personal and professional lives of the Kardashian–Jenner blended families. The series debuted on October 14, 2007, and became one of the longest-running reality television shows in the country.

The series was successful for its network, E!, and has resulted in the creation of numerous spin-offs, including Kourtney and Kim Take Miami (2009), in which Jenner has made multiple guest appearances. Jenner was also featured as a recurring cast member in Kourtney and Kim Take New York, which premiered in January 2011. Also in 2011, Jenner made an appearance in her daughter's show, Khloe & Lamar when it debuted, and the series focused on Khloe Kardashian and her then-husband Lamar Odom's personal life and relationship. On March 26, 2014, E! announced a Keeping Up with the Kardashians spin-off series titled Kourtney & Khloé Take the Hamptons. The Hamptons follows Kourtney, Khloé, and Scott Disick as they relocate to The Hamptons while the girls work on the New York Dash store plus open a pop-up store. The show also featured their family, including Jenner. In 2017, Jenner's youngest daughter Kylie, featured as the central cast member for the E! reality spin-off series Life of Kylie.

Jenner hosted a pop culture-driven daytime talk show, Kris. The series began its six-week trial summer run on several Fox-owned stations on July 15, 2013. Kanye West, her then-son-in-law through his marriage to Kim, revealed the first public picture of Jenner's granddaughter North West on the show. The show's six-week trial run was not extended.

In 2015, Jenner appeared as a recurring cast member in six episodes of the E! reality series I Am Cait. The show followed the journey of her ex-husband Caitlyn Jenner's (formerly Bruce) gender transition. Even after their 2015 divorce, they continued to co-star on Keeping Up with the Kardashians together with their children.

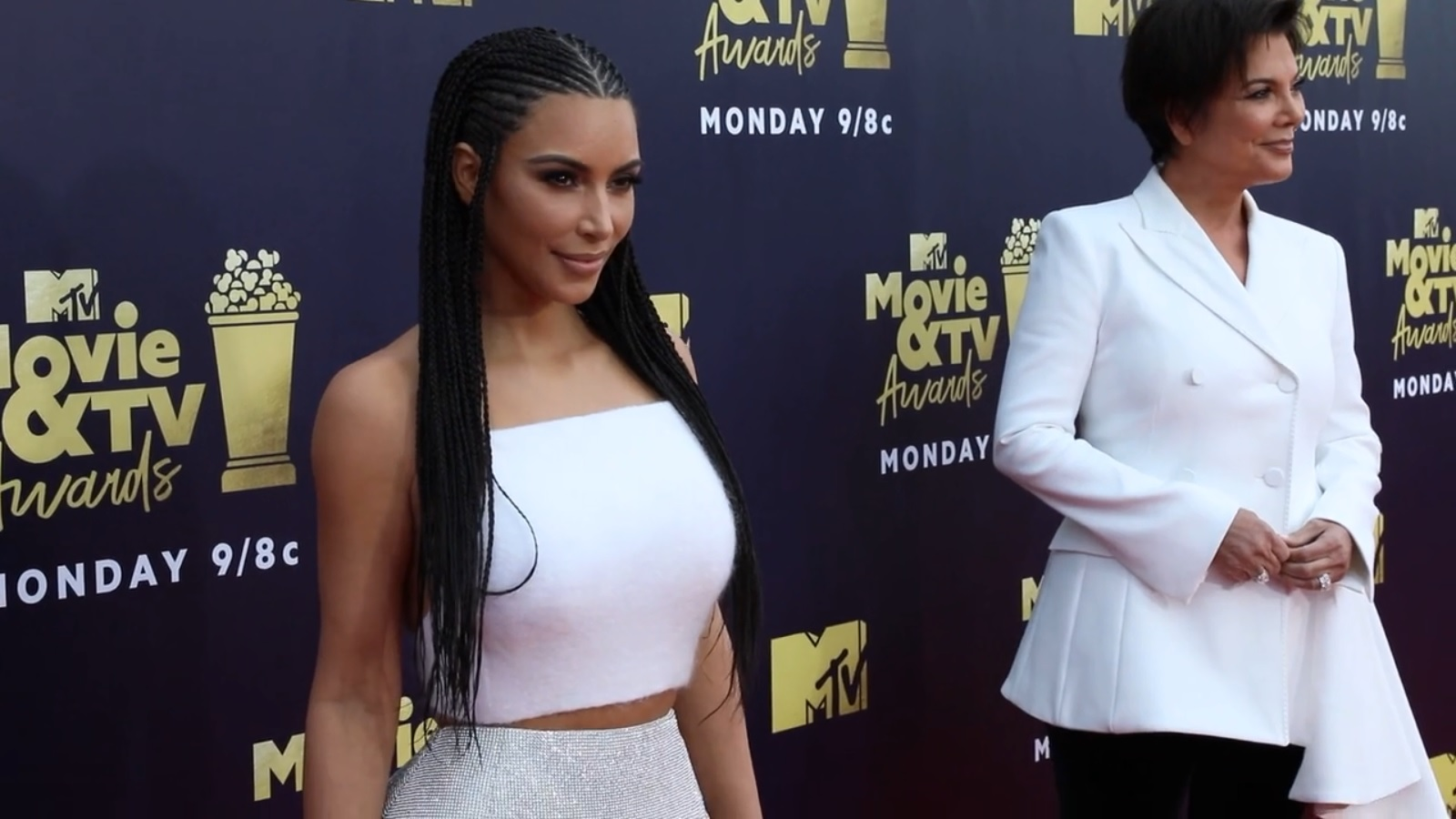
Kim Kardashian and Jenner at 2018 MTV Movie & TV Awards

In 2021, Jenner and her family announced that their reality show, Keeping Up with the Kardashians, would be ending after twenty seasons and almost 15 years on air. The final (twentieth) season premiered on March 18, 2021.

In April 2022, Jenner and her family returned to the television screens with their brand new reality television show, titled The Kardashians, after they left the E! Network to join Hulu. The show features Jenner, alongside her daughters Kourtney, Kim, Khloe, Kendall and Kylie, it also features ex and current partners including Scott Disick, Travis Barker, Tristan Thompson, and Corey Gamble, with Kanye West making a guest appearance. The first season premiered on April 14, 2022, and its ten episodes can be streamed exclusively on Disney+. Later in 2022, the show was announced to be returning for a second season, which officially premiered on September 22, 2022. In late 2022, it was announced that the show had been officially renewed for a third season, set to premier in the first half of 2023. The third season officially aired on May 25, 2023.

In 2024, Jenner joined the production team of the forthcoming Hulu legal drama series All's Fair, serving as an executive producer. Her daughter Kim stars in the series.

=== Business ===
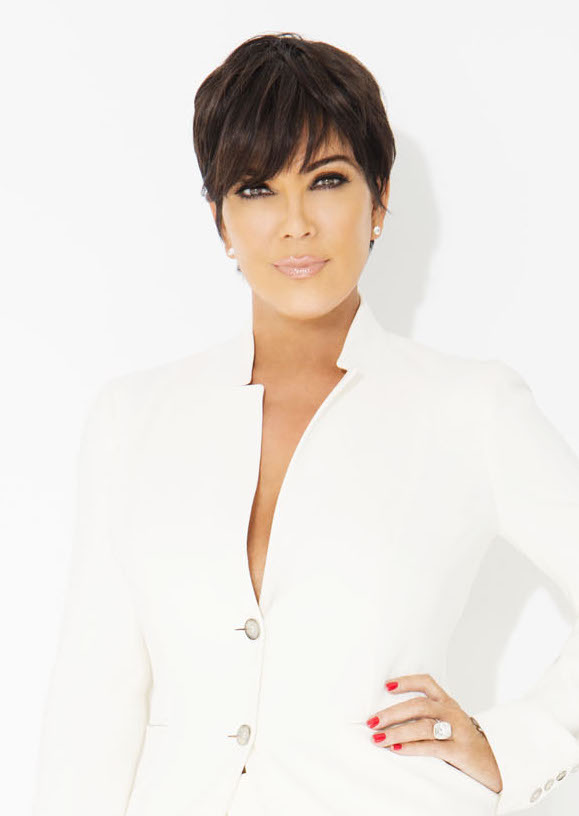
Jenner in 2014

Jenner runs her own production company, Jenner Communications, which is based in Los Angeles. Since before the start of Keeping Up with the Kardashians, she has managed her daughters' Kim, Kourtney, Khloe, Kendall, and Kylie's career.

Jenner opened a children's boutique in 2004 with her eldest daughter, Kourtney. The boutique was called "Smooch" and was open for almost six years before closing down in 2009. In 2011, Jenner launched a clothing line, Kris Jenner Kollection with QVC. Jenner had previously sold exercise equipment with QVC in the 1990s.

In 2014, Jenner and her youngest daughter Kylie founded a company called Kylie Lip Kits (now Kylie Cosmetics) and partnered with Seed Beauty, a retail and product development company co-founded by siblings, John and Laura Nelson. The company's first product Kylie Lip Kits, a liquid lipstick and lip liner, debuted on November 30, 2015. The first 15,000 lip kits were produced by Seed Beauty and funded by Kylie at a cost of $250,000 from her modelling earnings. The company was renamed to Kylie Cosmetics in February 2016, and production was increased to 500,000 kits. By the end of 2016, the company's total revenue was over $300 million. On May 9, 2018, Jenner and Kylie announced their collaboration called the Kris Kollection via Kylie's personal Instagram. The Mini Lip Set in the Kris Kollection, which includes eight mini liquid lipsticks, is aptly named "Momager", a title in which Jenner has personally taken on, and attempted to trademark, in recent years. In addition to the "Momager" Lip Kit, the Kris Kollection includes lip glosses and a four pan pressed powder highlight/blush palette, which has created much controversy online with both good and bad reviews. The collection was released just in time for Mother's Day.

In April 2020, Jenner teamed up with daughter Kim to launch a perfume collaboration titled KKW x Kris.

=== Writing ===
Jenner's autobiography, Kris Jenner... and All Things Kardashian, was released in November 2011. She later wrote a cookbook entitled In the Kitchen with Kris: A Kollection of Kardashian-Jenner Family Favorites, which was released in October 2014.

== Public image ==
Jenner has often been referred to as the "matriarch" of the family. Dimitri Ehrlich of Interview magazine called her "the matriarch of the Kardashian-Jenner brood" and the "21st century's preeminent female pop-cultural brand-builder." Jenner explained her operations as a businesswoman in her memoir Kris Jenner... And All Things Kardashian: "I started to look at our careers like pieces on a chessboard...Every day, I woke up and walked into my office and asked myself, 'What move do you need to make today?' It was very calculated. My business decisions and strategies were very intentional, definite and planned to the nth degree."

Jenner has been featured on the covers of numerous lifestyle and fashion magazines, including CR Fashion Book, Redbook, Cosmopolitan, Harper's Bazaar, The Hollywood Reporter, Es Magazine, Variety, New You, Haute Living, WSJ. Magazine and Stellar.

In 2023, Jenner appeared in the music video for American singer Meghan Trainor's new song "Mother", with Trainor describing her as "the mother of all mothers".

== Personal life ==
=== Marriages, relationships, and family ===
Jenner's first marriage was to lawyer Robert Kardashian (who later became widely known for his early legal representation of O. J. Simpson) on July 8, 1978. They have four children: daughters Kourtney (born 1979), Kim (born 1980), Khloé (born 1984), and son Rob (born 1987). Kardashian filed for divorce in 1990 after discovering Jenner's affair with former soccer player Todd Waterman. Their divorce was finalized in March 1991, but they remained friends until his death from esophageal cancer in 2003.

In April 1991, one month after her divorce from Kardashian, Jenner married her second spouse, retired Olympian Bruce Jenner, who publicly came out as a transgender woman in 2015, taking the name Caitlyn. They have two daughters together: Kendall (born 1995) and Kylie (born 1997); in her autobiography, Jenner explained that she named her daughter Kendall Nicole after the late Nicole Brown Simpson. By marriage to Bruce, Jenner also had four stepchildren: Burt, Cassandra "Casey", Brandon, and Brody.

The Jenners announced their separation in October 2013, and on September 22, 2014, Kris filed for divorce, citing irreconcilable differences. The divorce became final on March 23, 2015, because of a six-month state legal requirement. Jenner described the breakup with Caitlyn as "the most passive-aggressive thing", saying that while she had known of Caitlyn's use of hormones in the 1980s, "there wasn't a gender issue. Nobody mentioned a gender issue."

Jenner found it progressively difficult to come to terms with Caitlyn's transition, commenting in a 2015 Vanity Fair article that Caitlyn's emotional difficulties, including social anxiety, prior to her transition "was one of the reasons we were in a struggle at the end"; although Caitlyn stated of the reasons for their divorce that she felt "twenty percent was gender and 80 percent was the way I was treated". Jenner also publicly disapproved of Caitlyn's memoir The Secrets of My Life released in 2017, criticizing the comments Caitlyn made about her, their family, and their marriage.

As of 2025, Jenner has 13 grandchildren. She has been in a relationship with Corey Gamble since around 2014.

=== O. J. Simpson trial ===
Jenner and her family suffered emotional turmoil during the O. J. Simpson trial (1994–1995), later described as the "Trial of the Century." Jenner was a good friend of Simpson's ex-wife, Nicole Brown, and Jenner's first husband, Robert Kardashian, was one of O.J. Simpson's "Dream Team" of defense lawyers during the trial.

Jenner was portrayed by American actress Selma Blair in the FX limited series The People v. O. J. Simpson: American Crime Story, which premiered in February 2016.

=== California Community Church ===
Jenner and Pastor Brad Johnson founded the California Community Church in 2012. It originally was called the Life Change Community Church, located in Agoura Hills, California.

== Filmography ==
=== As herself ===
Television
Year	Title	Notes	Ref.
2007–2021	Keeping Up with the Kardashians	Main role (238 episodes)	
2008	Dancing with the Stars	Guest (4 episodes)	
2008, 2018	Celebrity Family Feud	Guest (3 episodes)	
2009–10	Kourtney and Kim Take Miami	Main role (3 episodes)	
2010	RuPaul's Drag U	Guest Judge	
2012–12	America's Next Top Model	Guest star; 2 episodes	
2011–12	Kourtney and Kim Take New York	Recurring role (6 episodes)	
2011	Khloé & Lamar	Recurring role (4 episodes)	
2013	Kris	Host (30 episodes)	
2014	Kourtney and Khloé Take The Hamptons	Recurring role (2 episodes)	
2015	I Am Cait	Recurring roles (6 episodes)	
2015	The Mindy Project	Guest appearance	
2016	Rob & Chyna	Recurring role (4 episodes)	
2016	Hollywood Medium	Guest star (1 episode)	
2017	RuPaul's Drag Race	Guest star (1 episode)	
2019	Flip It Like Disick	Guest appearance (2 episodes)	
2020	Justin Bieber: Seasons	Cameo	
2020	Kirby Jenner	Recurring role (3 episodes)	
2020	This Is Paris	Guest appearance (documentary)	
2022–present	The Kardashians	Main role	

=== As producer ===
Year	Title	Notes	Ref.
2007–2021	Keeping Up with the Kardashians	Executive producer (78 episodes)	
2011–12	Kourtney & Kim Take New York	Executive producer (20 episodes)	
2011–12	Khloé & Lamar	Executive producer (20 episodes)	
2009–13	Kourtney & Kim Take Miami	Executive producer (20 episodes)	
2013	Kris	Executive producer (30 episodes)	
2016	Rob & Chyna	Executive producer (3 episodes)	
2019	Flip It Like Disick	Executive producer (1 episode)	
2020	Kirby Jenner	Executive producer (8 episodes)	
2025	All's Fair	Executive producer (9 episodes)	

=== In music videos ===
Year	Title	Artist(s)	Role	Ref.
2016	"Where's the Love?"	The Black Eyed Peas featuring The World	Herself	
2018	"Thank U, Next"	Ariana Grande	Mrs. George	
2023	"Mother"	Meghan Trainor	Herself	
