= The Secrets of My Life =

2017 memoir by Caitlyn Jenner

- Author: Caitlyn Jenner
- Language: English
- Genre: Memoir
- Publisher: Grand Central Publishing
- Publication date: April 25, 2017
- Publication place: United States
- Pages: 336
- ISBN: 9781455596751

The Secrets of My Life is a 2017 memoir by Caitlyn Jenner. The memoir covers many aspects of her life to include her childhood as Bruce Jenner and her rise to fame as a gold medal-winning Olympic decathlete, three marriages, Jenner's relationships with her children, her transition and experience as the world's most famous transgender woman.

== Synopsis ==
Jenner details her three marriages and the role that her gender identity played in them. She writes that she told her first wife Chrystie about her gender dysphoria in 1973 after she noticed a rubber band Jenner had placed on her bra after wearing it. Her second marriage to Linda ended after Linda discovered Jenner wearing women's clothes. Jenner writes that she told third wife Kris about her gender identity early in the relationship, before they ever had sexual relations.

Jenner writes that she began hormone therapy as part of her transition in the 1980s, becoming more feminine and growing breasts. She ultimately decided not to go through with it, stating that it would have been too hard on her family and herself. She had her breasts removed, telling the doctor that they had grown as a result of steroid use.

After her divorce from Kris, she decides to go through with her transition, having her final surgery in January 2017.

== Reception ==
The book appeared on The New York Times Best seller list, and the USA Today Best seller list.

The Kirkus Review wrote about the book "Painting a life both shallow and deep, painstakingly choreographed and unscripted, Jenner's candid portrait of a self in the remaking is a marvel to behold." Publishers Weekly called the book a "sincere though uneven tell-all autobiography."
