= Whoops (song) =

- Remix cover

Single by Meghan Trainor

from the album Timeless
- Released: June 24, 2024
- Genre: Doo-wop; pop
- Length: 2:28
- Label: Epic
- Songwriters: Meghan Trainor; Sean Douglas; Gian Stone; Grant Boutin
- Producers: Gian Stone; Grant Boutin

Meghan Trainor singles chronology
"To the Moon" (2024)	"Whoops" (2024)	"Slippin'" (2024)

Music video
- "Whoops" on YouTube

"Whoops" is a song by American singer-songwriter Meghan Trainor from her sixth major-label studio album, Timeless (2024). Trainor wrote the song with Sean Douglas and its producers, Gian Stone and Grant Boutin. Epic Records released it as the album's third single on June 24, 2024. "Whoops" is a pop-doo-wop break-up song, on which she addresses an ex-partner and derides the woman who he cheated on her with.

"Whoops" reached numbers 18 and 27 on the Adult Pop Airplay and Pop Airplay charts in the US, respectively. The song also peaked at number 94 in the UK. Phillip R Lopez directed its music video, in which Trainor dances in an empty room and destroys every piece of furniture in it with a baseball bat. She performed the song on the television shows Today and The Tonight Show Starring Jimmy Fallon, and Capital's Summertime Ball 2024. Trainor also included it on the set list of her 2024 concert tour, the Timeless Tour.

== Background ==
Meghan Trainor's popularity declined in the lead-up to the release of her third major-label studio album, Treat Myself (2020), which received limited live promotion due to the COVID-19 lockdowns. After her 2014 song "Title" attained viral popularity on video-sharing service TikTok in 2021, she announced her intention to return to its parent album's doo-wop sound on her fifth major-label studio album. TikTok was highly influential on Trainor's creative process, and she began writing material that would resonate with audiences on it. She gained popularity on it while regularly sharing clips and other content with influencer Chris Olsen. Takin' It Back (2022) included the single "Made You Look", which went viral on TikTok. It became Trainor's first song since 2016 to enter the top 40 on the US Billboard Hot 100 and reached the top 10 in several other countries.

Gian Stone, who had produced four tracks on Takin' It Back, returned to produce Trainor's song "Been Like This" (2024) alongside Grant Boutin. It was released as the lead single from her sixth major-label studio album, Timeless (2024), in March 2024. Trainor also wrote the song "Whoops" alongside songwriter Sean Douglas and its producers, Stone and Boutin. It was inspired by the work of Jack Harlow, as Trainor imagined what a collaboration between them would sound like. On May 22, 2024, she began teasing the song and revealed some of its lyrics through a snippet. Trainor confirmed that it was not about infidelity from her husband, Daryl Sabara, whom she had been happily married to for five years.

== Composition ==
"Whoops" is 2 minutes and 28 seconds long. Stone and Boutin produced, programmed, and engineered the song, and they provided background vocals alongside Douglas. Trainor handled vocal production and Boutin played keyboards. Tom Norris mixed the song at Snackworld in Los Angeles, and Randy Merrill mastered it at Sterling Sound in New York City.

Rolling Stone's Tomás Mier characterized "Whoops" as a pop-doo-wop song, and Riff's Mike DeWald believed it has a "modern minimalistic pop sound" reminiscent of the work of Ariana Grande. AllMusic's Matt Collar thought the song represented Trainor's "contemporary, hip-hop-inspired update of '50s vocal doo wop" on Timeless, which was one of the stylistic notes that popularized her. Writing for the Official Charts Company, George Griffiths believed it mixed the album's sound with "bone-crunching R&B" but was the song that most resembled a "classic Meghan track". According to Renowned for Sound's Graeme R, "Whoops" begins like Britney Spears's song "Lucky" before it "picks up tempo and beat".

Lyrically, "Whoops" is a break-up song on which Trainor addresses an ex-partner who made mistakes during their relationship. She derides the woman he cheated on her with, claiming that she is less attractive than Trainor and has small buttocks: "And she got 'bout half/Of my looks with no class." Sputnikmusic's Benjamin Jack was critical of this and believed it contradicted Trainor's usual body-positive message, casting "doubt upon the character the singer has cultivated for herself over the years".

== Release and promotion ==
Epic Records released an Ellis remix of "Whoops" on June 5, 2024. Two days later, Trainor performed the song on Today. Phillip R Lopez directed its music video, which was released on June 10. In it, Trainor dances and poses in an empty room, and she later comes with a baseball bat and destroys every piece of furniture inside the room. In an episode of her podcast Workin' on It, she reflected that it was her favorite music video ever, except another one she had filmed with her son Riley, and it accentuated her buttocks so much that she would show it to her grandchildren one day. Although Trainor noted that she hated smashing biodegradable objects in it and was afraid she would accidentally hit someone.

On June 11, Trainor was scheduled to perform the song "To the Moon" on The Tonight Show Starring Jimmy Fallon. Upon returning to her hotel after completing all the rehearsals, she reconsidered the song choice and decided she should sing "Whoops" instead. Though the label was initially waiting for one of the songs on Timeless to gain popularity on TikTok, Trainor called and convinced them to send the song to radio stations as the third single from the album on June 24. Her stylist arranged new outfits for her six backup dancers on short notice, and Trainor ended up performing "Whoops" on the show despite facing difficulties singing it and remembering the dance moves, and later at Capital's Summertime Ball 2024. Trainor included the song on the set list of her 2024 concert tour, the Timeless Tour.

== Commercial performance ==
"Whoops" peaked at numbers 18 and 27 on the Adult Pop Airplay and Pop Airplay charts in the US, respectively. The song debuted at number 25 on the Digital Song Sales chart. It entered at number 94 on the UK Singles Chart issued for June 21, 2024. "Whoops" also reached number 18 on the New Zealand Hot Singles chart.

== Credits and personnel ==
Credits are adapted from the liner notes of Timeless.

- Gian Stone – producer, songwriter, programming, engineer, background vocals
- Grant Boutin – producer, songwriter, programming, engineer, background vocals, keyboards
- Meghan Trainor – songwriter, vocal producer
- Sean Douglas – songwriter, background vocals
- Randy Merrill – mastering
- Tom Norris – mixing

== Charts ==
Chart positions for "Whoops"
Chart (2024)	Peak position
New Zealand Hot Singles (RMNZ)	18
UK Singles (Official Charts)	94
US Adult Pop Airplay (Billboard)	18
US Digital Song Sales (Billboard)	25
US Pop Airplay (Billboard)	27

== Release history ==
Release dates and format(s) for "Whoops"
Region	Date	Format(s)	Version	Label	Ref.
Various	June 5, 2024	Digital download; streaming	Remixes	Epic	
United States	June 24, 2024	Radio airplay	Original	Epic	
