= 2024 Kids' Choice Awards =

Children's television awards show program broadcast in 2024

- Date: July 13, 2024
- Location: Barker Hangar; Santa Monica, California
- Hosted by: SpongeBob SquarePants (Note: The characters' respective voice actors, Tom Kenny and Bill Fagerbakke, voiced their characters while being filmed backstage via motion capture, marking the first time the ceremony has been hosted by animated characters.); Patrick Star
- Most awards: Barbie (4)
- Most nominations: Barbie (8)

Television/radio coverage
- Network: Nickelodeon; TeenNick; Nicktoons; Nick Jr. Channel; TV Land; CMT; MTV2
- Runtime: 91 minutes
- Viewership: 0.30 million; 1.7 million (total)
- Produced by: Pietro Barella; Chris McQueen
- Directed by: James Merryman

The 37th Annual Nickelodeon Kids' Choice Awards ceremony was held on July 13, 2024, at the Barker Hangar in Santa Monica, California with SpongeBob SquarePants and Patrick Star serving as hosts. It aired live on Nickelodeon and in a domestic simulcast with several other Paramount Global cable networks, and was broadcast live or tape delayed across all of Nickelodeon's international networks. This was the first show to take place in July instead of March, April, or May since the 1992 Kids' Choice Awards.

The ceremony was dedicated to the 25th anniversary of SpongeBob SquarePants, and was presented, "in an animated setting through enhanced graphics and advanced augmented reality." Kira Kosarin, Jack Griffo, and Young Dylan served as correspondents alongside SpongeBob and Patrick throughout the show.

The Nickelodeon network premiere of Hotel Transylvania: Transformania led into the ceremony, while a new episode of Rock Paper Scissors served as the lead-out.

== Appearances ==
Acceptance speeches from the Kids' Choice Awards 2024.

Prior to the ceremony, DangMattSmith and Jane McManus hosted an Orange Carpet livestream on the Nickelodeon YouTube channel. The livestream also featured Madison Skye as an interviewer.

The ceremony featured appearances by celebrities including Jack Black, Adam Sandler, Benny Blanco, Henry Golding, Jack Griffo, Anna Kendrick, Heidi Klum, Kira Kosarin, Kel Mitchell, Shameik Moore, Rita Ora, Reneé Rapp, Jelly Roll, Kenan Thompson, and Serena Williams. Appearances via pre-recorded segments included Margot Robbie and Timothée Chalamet.

Animated character appearances (other than SpongeBob and Patrick) included Sandy Cheeks (Carolyn Lawrence), Dora the Explorer, Lincoln Loud, Rock, Paper and Scissors (Ron Funches, Thomas Lennon, and Carlos Alazraqui) and the Paw Patrol (Chase, Marshall, and Rubble).

Presenters at the 2024 Kids' Choice Awards
Presenter(s)	Role
Sandy Cheeks (Carolyn Lawrence)	Opened the show
Benny Blanco Bella Poarch	Presented 'Favorite Male Voice from an Animated Movie'
Mckenna Grace Kylie Cantrall	Presented 'Favorite Breakout Artist'
Chris Hemsworth Keegan-Michael Key Brian Tyree Henry	Preview of Transformers One
Dora the Explorer	Presented 'Favorite Family TV Show'
Jack Griffo Kira Kosarin	Presented 'Favorite Creator Family', 'Favorite Male TV Star (Kids)', and 'Favorite Reality Show'
Kenan Thompson Kel Mitchell	Presented 'Favorite Villain'
Hannah Stocking Young Dylan	Presented 'Favorite Movie Actor'
Kelly Rowland	Presented 'Legend'
Jack Griffo Kira Kosarin Ryan Kaji	Presented 'Favorite Social Music Star' and 'Favorite Female Creator'
Jelly Roll Heidi Klum	Presented 'Favorite Female Voice from an Animated Movie'
Jack Griffo Kira Kosarin Young Dylan	Presented 'Favorite Song'
Rita Ora	Introduced The Kid Laroi
Rock (Ron Funches) Paper (Thomas Lennon) Scissors (Carlos Alazraqui)	Presented 'Favorite Kids TV Show', 'Favorite Female TV Star (Kids)', 'Favorite Female TV Star (Family)', 'Favorite Male TV Star (Family)', 'Favorite Movie', 'Favorite Cartoon', 'Favorite Male Sports Star', 'Favorite Female Sports Star', 'Favorite Gamer', 'Favorite Video Game', 'Favorite Music Group', 'Favorite Viral Song', 'Favorite Female Artist', 'Favorite Global Music Star', 'Favorite Ticket of the Year', 'Favorite Music Collaboration', and 'Favorite Movie Actress'
Lincoln Loud	Presented 'Favorite Animated Movie'
Henry Golding	Presented 'Favorite Male Artist'

== Performers ==
Performers at the 2024 Kids' Choice Awards
Performer(s)	Song(s)
N/A	Dance medley "J Christ" "I Luv It" "Greedy" "Not My Fault" "Texas Hold 'Em" "Teka" "Lil Boo Thang" (with Paul Russell)
The Kid Laroi	"Nights Like This" "Girls" "Stay"
LA Marching Band	"Happy Birthday to You" "SpongeBob SquarePants Theme Song"

== Winners and nominees ==
The nominees were announced and voting opened on June 4, 2024. This ceremony featured the categorial debut of Favorite Ticket of the Year. The winners are highlighted in bold.

=== Movies ===
Favorite Movie	Favorite Movie Actor
**Barbie**; Aquaman and the Lost Kingdom; Ghostbusters: Frozen Empire; Guardians of the Galaxy Vol. 3; The Little Mermaid; The Marvels; Transformers: Rise of the Beasts; Wonka	**Timothée Chalamet** – Wonka as Willy Wonka; Adam Sandler – You Are So Not Invited to My Bat Mitzvah as Danny Friedman; Chris Pratt – Guardians of the Galaxy Vol. 3 as Peter Quill/Star Lord; Jason Momoa – Aquaman and the Lost Kingdom as Arthur Curry/Aquaman; John Cena – Fast X as Jakob Toretto; Paul Rudd – Ghostbusters: Frozen Empire as Gary Grooberson; Ryan Gosling – Barbie as Ken; Ryan Reynolds – IF as Cal
Favorite Movie Actress	Favorite Animated Movie
**Margot Robbie** – Barbie as Barbie; America Ferrera – Barbie as Gloria; Brie Larson – The Marvels as Carol Danvers/Captain Marvel; Halle Bailey – The Little Mermaid as Ariel; Jennifer Garner – Family Switch as Jess; Melissa McCarthy – The Little Mermaid as Ursula; Zendaya – Dune: Part Two as Chani; Zoe Saldaña – Guardians of the Galaxy Vol. 3 as Gamora	**Spider-Man: Across the Spider-Verse**; Elemental; Kung Fu Panda 4; Paw Patrol: The Mighty Movie; Teenage Mutant Ninja Turtles: Mutant Mayhem; The Garfield Movie; The Super Mario Bros. Movie; Trolls Band Together
Favorite Male Voice from an Animated Movie	Favorite Female Voice from an Animated Movie
**Adam Sandler** – Leo as Leo; Brady Noon – Teenage Mutant Ninja Turtles: Mutant Mayhem as Raphael; Chris Pratt as Mario – The Super Mario Bros. Movie; Jack Black as Bowser – The Super Mario Bros. Movie; Jack Black – Kung Fu Panda 4 as Po; Jackie Chan – Teenage Mutant Ninja Turtles: Mutant Mayhem as Splinter; Justin Timberlake – Trolls Band Together as Branch; Shameik Moore – Spider-Man: Across the Spider-Verse as Miles Morales / Spider-Man	**Anna Kendrick** – Trolls Band Together as Poppy; Anya Taylor-Joy as Peach – The Super Mario Bros. Movie; Ariana DeBose – Wish as Asha; Awkwafina – Kung Fu Panda 4 as Zhen; Ayo Edebiri – Teenage Mutant Ninja Turtles: Mutant Mayhem as April O'Neil; Hailee Steinfeld – Spider-Man: Across the Spider-Verse as Gwen Stacy / Spider-Woman; Kristen Bell – Paw Patrol: The Mighty Movie as Janet; McKenna Grace – Paw Patrol: The Mighty Movie as Skye
Favorite Villain
**Jack Black** as Bowser – The Super Mario Bros. Movie; Amy Schumer – Trolls Band Together as Velvet; Austin Butler – Dune: Part Two as Feyd-Rautha Harkonnen; Keegan-Michael Key – Wonka as Chief of Police; Melissa McCarthy – The Little Mermaid as Ursula; Reneé Rapp – Mean Girls as Regina George

=== Television ===
Favorite Kids TV Show	Favorite Male TV Star (Kids)
**Percy Jackson and the Olympians**; Danger Force; High School Musical: The Musical: The Series; The Muppets Mayhem; Power Rangers Cosmic Fury; Raven's Home; The Really Loud House; Tyler Perry's Young Dylan	**Walker Scobell** – Percy Jackson and the Olympians as Percy Jackson; Chance Perez – Power Rangers Cosmic Fury as Javi Garcia/Black Ranger; Jahzir Bruno – The Really Loud House as Clyde McBride; Joshua Bassett – High School Musical: The Musical: The Series as Ricky; Wolfgang Schaeffer – The Really Loud House as Lincoln Loud; Young Dylan – Tyler Perry's Young Dylan as Young Dylan
Favorite Female TV Star (Kids)	Favorite Family TV Show
**Olivia Rodrigo** – High School Musical: The Musical: The Series as Nini; Hunter Deno – Power Rangers Cosmic Fury as Amelia Jones/Red Ranger; Lilly Singh – The Muppets Mayhem as Nora Singh; Raven-Symoné – Raven's Home as Raven Baxter; Sofia Wylie – High School Musical: The Musical: The Series as Gina; Tessa Rao – Power Rangers Cosmic Fury as Izzy Garcia/Green Ranger	**Young Sheldon**; Abbott Elementary; Avatar: The Last Airbender; Goosebumps; iCarly; Loki
Favorite Male TV Star (Family)	Favorite Female TV Star (Family)
**Iain Armitage** – Young Sheldon as Sheldon Cooper; Gordon Cormier – Avatar: The Last Airbender as Aang; Jerry Trainor – iCarly as Spencer Shay; Justin Long – Goosebumps as Nathan Bratt; Tom Hiddleston – Loki as Loki; Zack Morris - Goosebumps as Isaiah Howard	**Miranda Cosgrove** – iCarly as Carly Shay; Janelle James – Abbott Elementary as Ava Coleman; Laci Mosley – iCarly as Harper; Peyton List – School Spirits as Maddie Nears; Quinta Brunson – Abbott Elementary as Janine Teagues; Rosario Dawson – Ahsoka as Ahsoka Tano
Favorite Reality Show	Favorite Cartoon
**America's Got Talent**; America's Funniest Home Videos; American Ninja Warrior; Is It Cake?; Kids Baking Championship; LEGO Masters	**SpongeBob SquarePants**; Big City Greens; Monster High; The Loud House; The Simpsons; Teen Titans Go!

=== Music ===
Favorite Music Group	Favorite Male Artist
**Imagine Dragons**; Black Eyed Peas; Coldplay; Jonas Brothers; Maroon 5; *NSYNC	**Post Malone**; Bad Bunny; Drake; Ed Sheeran; Justin Timberlake; Travis Scott; Usher; The Weeknd
Favorite Female Artist	Favorite Song
**Taylor Swift**; Ariana Grande; Beyoncé; Billie Eilish; Cardi B; Miley Cyrus; Olivia Rodrigo; Selena Gomez	**"What Was I Made For?"** – Billie Eilish; "Dance the Night" – Dua Lipa; "Fast Car" – Luke Combs; "Flowers" – Miley Cyrus; "Paint the Town Red" – Doja Cat; "Selfish" – Justin Timberlake; "Texas Hold 'Em" – Beyoncé; "Yes, And?" – Ariana Grande
Favorite Album	Favorite Breakout Artist
**Guts** – Olivia Rodrigo; Barbie: The Album; Cowboy Carter – Beyoncé; Endless Summer Vacation – Miley Cyrus; The Tortured Poets Department – Taylor Swift; Whitsitt Chapel – Jelly Roll	**Reneé Rapp**; Coco Jones; Ice Spice; Jelly Roll; Tate McRae; Teddy Swims; Tyla; Victoria Monét
Favorite Music Collaboration	Favorite Social Music Star
**"Barbie World"** – Nicki Minaj and Ice Spice with Aqua; "All My Life" – Lil Durk and J. Cole; "Baby Don't Hurt Me" – David Guetta, Anne-Marie and Coi Leray; "Doctor (Work It Out)" – Pharrell Williams featuring Miley Cyrus; "Fortnight" – Taylor Swift featuring Post Malone; "Karma (Remix)" – Taylor Swift and Ice Spice; "Supposed to Be Loved" – DJ Khaled featuring Lil Baby, Future and Lil Uzi Vert; "Wild Ones" – Jessie Murph and Jelly Roll	**Bella Poarch**; Addison Rae; David Kushner; Djo; Madison Beer; Paul Russell
Favorite Global Music Star	Favorite Ticket of the Year
**North America: Taylor Swift**; Africa: Tyla; Asia: Blackpink; Australia/NZ: Troye Sivan; Europe: Zara Larsson; Latin America: Karol G; UK: Dua Lipa	**Taylor Swift** – The Eras Tour; Bad Bunny – Most Wanted Tour; Beyoncé – Renaissance World Tour; Blackpink – Born Pink World Tour; Olivia Rodrigo – Guts World Tour; Sabrina Carpenter – Emails I Can't Send Tour
Favorite Viral Song
**"Espresso"** – Sabrina Carpenter; "Beautiful Things" – Benson Boone; "Daylight" – David Kushner; "Greedy" – Tate McRae; "Lil Boo Thang" – Paul Russell; "Water" – Tyla

=== Sports ===
Favorite Male Sports Star	Favorite Female Sports Star
**Travis Kelce**; Cristiano Ronaldo; LeBron James; Lionel Messi; Patrick Mahomes; Stephen Curry	**Simone Biles**; Alex Morgan; Caitlin Clark; Coco Gauff; Sha'Carri Richardson; Venus Williams

=== Miscellaneous ===
Favorite Male Creator	Favorite Female Creator
**MrBeast**; Dhar Mann; Mark Rober; Markiplier; Ryan's World; Spencer X	**Lexi Rivera**; Charli D'Amelio; Dixie D'Amelio; Emma Chamberlain; Hannah Stocking; Kids Diana Show
Favorite Creator Family	Favorite Gamer
**Jordan Matter/Salish Matter**; The Beverly Halls; FGTeeV; The Herberts; Ninja Kidz TV; Royalty Family	**Kai Cenat**; Aphmau; Ninja; PrestonPlayz; TheBoyDilly; Unspeakable
Favorite Video Game
**Roblox**; Just Dance 2024; Madden NFL 24; Minecraft; Super Mario Bros. Wonder; The Legend of Zelda: Tears of the Kingdom

== Special Recognitions ==
=== Fan Favorite Movie ===
- Good Burger 2

=== Legend ===
- Serena Williams

== International awards ==
The winners were announced through local Nickelodeon broadcasts or on social media in each region.

Favorite Kidfluencer (Africa)	Favorite Influencer (Kazakhstan)
Kairo Forbes; Boluwatife Balogun; Biko's Manna; DJ Wysei; Dream Catchers Academy	Alpysbaev Family; Ario Malgazhdar; Аёка; Ramina Almas
Favorite Asian Act	Aussie/ Kiwi Legend of the Year
SB19 (Philippines); Enhypen (South Korea); Iman Troye (Malaysia); NiziU (Japan); Tiara Andini (Indonesia)	Robert Irwin; G Flip; Maia Mitchell; Budjerah; Mary Fowler; Angourie Rice
Favorite Star (Belgium)	Favorite Influencer (Spain)
Stien Edlund; Julie Vermeire; Sieg de Doncker; Oussama Nacer	El Cromas; Juan Pérez; Martina Lucena; El Rincón de Ani
Favorite Star (Netherlands)	Brazilian Artist
Maxime & Sophie; Buddy Vedder; Zoe Tauran	Ana Castela; Ananda; Iza; João; Luan Santana; Manu Gavassi
Brazilian Influencer	Favorite Influencer (Estonia)
Lactea; Bárbara Coura; David Costa; Duda Pimenta; Natan Por Ai; Gi Robatini	Sidni Tomson; Grete Anete; Andreas Melts; Victoria Villig
Favorite Social Media Newcomer (Germany, Austria & Switzerland)	Favorite Social Media Star (Germany, Austria & Switzerland)
Liam Carpenter; Johannesmlz; Joshua Monis; Lucy Lacht; Paula.plsi; tyyrathecreator	Marco Strecker; Emiirbayrak; Julesboringlife; Karim Jamal; Lisa Küppers; Twenty4Tim
Favorite Singer (Italy)	Favorite Social Star (Italy)
Angelina Mango; Clara; Matteo Romano; The Kolors; Bresh; Alfa	ArienneMakeUpù; Kiro Ebra; Space Family; Matteo Robert; Lisa Lucchetta; Mario Caruso
Funniest Creator (Latin America)	Favorite Artist (Latin America)
Borrego; Ian Lucas; Ana Emilia; Lukas Urkijo; Rivers; Fede Vigevani	Nicki Nicole; Latin Mafia; Emilia Mernes; Manuel Turizo; Tini; Kenia Os
Favorite Influencer (Latvia)	Favorite Opinion Maker (Lithuania)
Diona; Jēkabs Niklāvs Janovs; Krista Gailīte; Edgar Fresh	Sima; Aurimas Valujavičius; Inide Jasnauskaite; Martas Tankevičius
Favorite Influencer (Poland)	Israeli Nick Star
Julia Machunik; Paulina Kobus; Amelia Zalewska; Kacper "Jasper" Porębski; Dominik Rupiński; Wiktoria Łącka	Kim Ben Shimon; Kevin Rubin; Dylan Dror; Kim Or Azoulay; Ido Elieli
Favorite Superstar (United Kingdom)
Tom Holland; Adele; Jude Bellingham; Lewis Hamilton; Mary Earps; Millie Bobby Brown
