= Timeless (Meghan Trainor album) =

2024 studio album by Meghan Trainor

Studio album by Meghan Trainor
- Released: June 7, 2024
- Recorded: July–October 2023
- Genres: Doo-wop; bubblegum pop
- Length: 44:20
- Label: Epic
- Producers: Federico Vindver; Gian Stone; Grant Boutin; Justin Trainor; Jason Evigan

Meghan Trainor chronology
Takin' It Back (2022)	Timeless (2024)	Toy with Me (2026)

Singles from Timeless
- 1. "Been Like This" Released: March 14, 2024; 2. "To the Moon" Released: May 3, 2024; 3. "Whoops" Released: June 24, 2024

Singles from Timeless (Deluxe)
- 1. "Criminals" Released: September 20, 2024

Timeless is the sixth studio album by American singer-songwriter Meghan Trainor. It was released on June 7, 2024, by Epic Records. Trainor collaborated with producers such as Federico Vindver, Gian Stone, Grant Boutin, and Jason Evigan and featured artists included T-Pain, Lawrence, and Niecy Nash. The album has a doo-wop and bubblegum pop sound with club beats and influences of dance-pop and R&B. Its message centers on self-empowerment, women's empowerment, and positive self-talk, drawing inspiration from Trainor's family, motherhood, and her experiences in the music industry.

Trainor promoted Timeless with public appearances and televised performances on programs such as Today and The Tonight Show Starring Jimmy Fallon. After its release, she embarked on her first concert tour in over seven years, The Timeless Tour (2024). The album was supported by three singles, "Been Like This", a collaboration with T-Pain, "To the Moon", and "Whoops". Critics believed it combined genres from Trainor's previous music in a more intense manner. Timeless debuted at number 27 on the US Billboard 200 with Trainor's best sales week since 2020. The album also reached number 12 in the United Kingdom and number 23 in Australia. Its deluxe edition, supported by the single "Criminals", was released on August 16, 2024.

== Background ==
Meghan Trainor's popularity declined in the lead-up to the release of her third major-label studio album, Treat Myself (2020), and it received limited live promotion due to the COVID-19 lockdowns. After her 2014 song "Title" attained viral popularity on the video-sharing service TikTok in 2021, she announced her intention to return to its parent album's doo-wop sound on her fifth major-label studio album. TikTok was highly influential on Trainor's creative process, and she began writing material that would resonate with its userbase. She gained popularity on the service by regularly sharing clips that she filmed with influencer Chris Olsen. Her 2022 album Takin' It Back included the single "Made You Look", which went viral on TikTok. It became Trainor's first song since 2016 to enter the top 40 on the US Billboard Hot 100 and reached the top 10 in several other countries.

== Recording and production ==
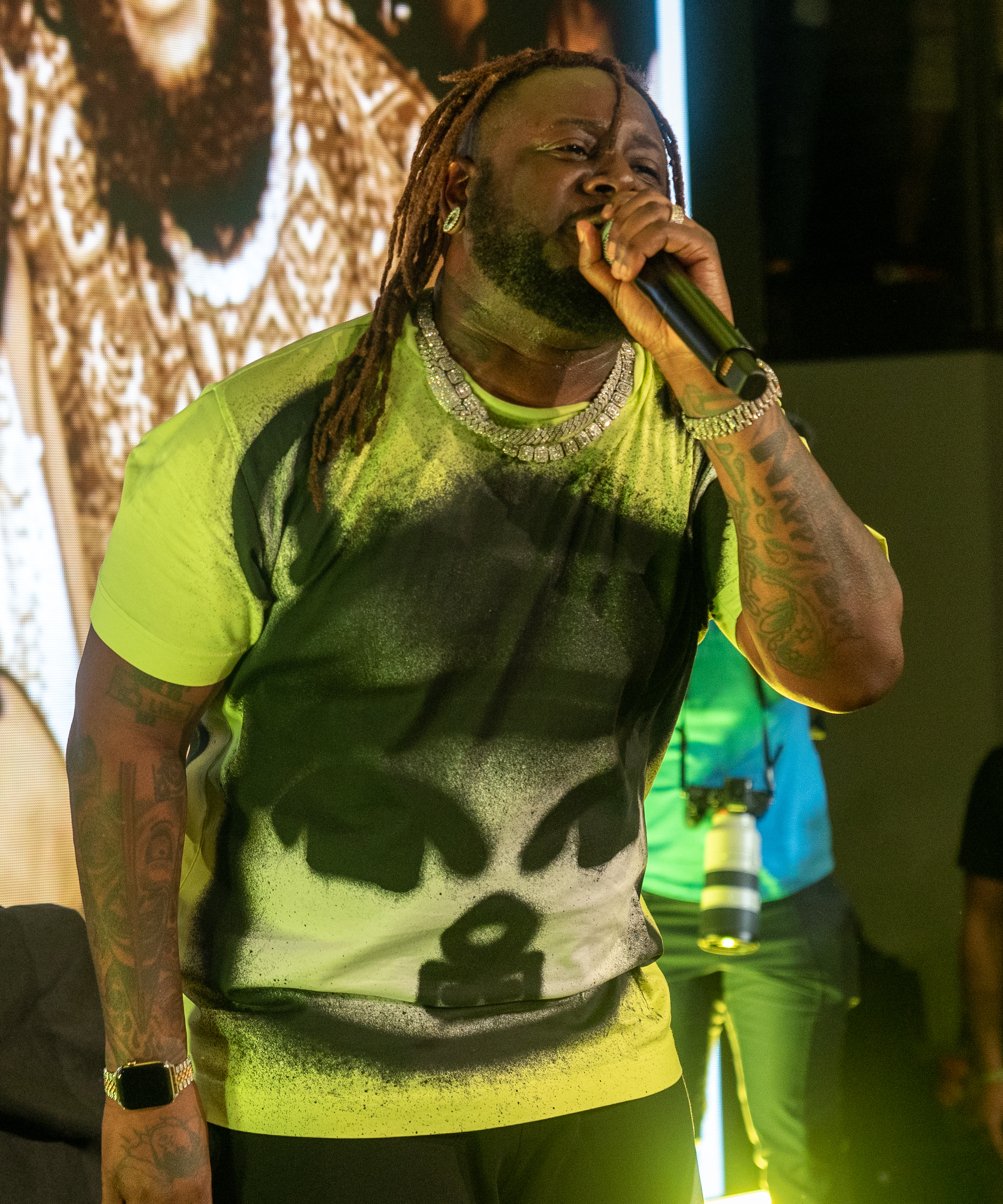
T-Pain (pictured in 2022) appears on two songs on Timeless.

Trainor hosted producer Gian Stone in an episode of her podcast Workin' on It in March 2023, during which she announced that she had one more album left in her contract with Epic Records. She was considering recording country songs for it at the time. The first Timeless track to be written was "Doin' It All for You", which was created without plans for a full-length album in mind. Trainor wrote the song "Forget How to Love" with her brothers and Scott Hoying within 10 days after giving birth to her second son, who was born on July 1, 2023.

The song "Whoops" was inspired by the work of American rapper Jack Harlow, as Trainor imagined what a collaboration between them would sound like. After Trainor had written many self-confidence songs for the album, she ran out of inspiration. Her manager sent her a speech by American actress Niecy Nash, which stimulated her creatively and inspired "I Wanna Thank Me"; Nash appeared as a feature on it. Trainor previewed it for the label alongside the songs "Been Like This", "To the Moon", "Forget How to Love", and "Whoops". They were satisfied with the material, according to Trainor, and they nudged her to rapidly complete the rest of the album. She worked with producers including Federico Vindver, Stone, Grant Boutin, her brother Justin, and Jason Evigan. Both Vindver and Stone had served as producers on Takin' It Back, and the former produced three tracks for Trainor's Christmas album A Very Trainor Christmas (2020). Timeless was completed in approximately three months.

Trainor had been a fan of American singer and rapper T-Pain for years, having previously cited him as an inspiration in a 2014 interview. Reciprocating this, he began seeking out the help of her husband, Daryl Sabara, and her manager to bring about a meeting in 2023. Trainor sent him two songs, suggesting that he feature on them, but she did not immediately receive a response. Instead, T-Pain surprised her at her 30th birthday celebration, where they ate pizza and played each other unreleased music. He told her that he had recorded guest appearances for both the songs, "Been Like This" and "Love on Hold", to appear on Timeless.

Trainor chose Timeless as the album title to reflect her desire to live forever for her children: "I want to live. Like, 'Wow. We're so lucky, we're here. We have all this time together.'" She believed the album consisted of "a lot of self-help pop bangers" and "some really soulful songs". Trainor's intention with it was to make listeners happy: "If they're feeling down about themselves, I hope that my song can try to change their energy and their inner thoughts, hopefully, to make them feel a little better [...] So I hope I'm making people dance and making people happy." In the accompanying statement, Trainor celebrated the 10-year anniversary of her career and dedicated Timeless to her fans and family.

== Composition ==
=== Overview ===
The standard edition of Timeless contains 16 tracks; on physical editions, the track "Bite Me" is exclusive to the Target version. (Note: The Target CD edition was later available as a "D2C Digital Deluxe" on digital platforms.) The album predominantly has a doo-wop and bubblegum pop sound with club beats and influences of dance-pop and R&B. Contrasting the consistently doo-wop-influenced pop style of Takin' It Back, Trainor wanted the songs on Timeless to begin in one genre and switch to another by the chorus, which she believed "opened up a new genre". Benjamin Jack of Sputnikmusic described its predominant style as "doo-wop infrastructure charged with modern pop hallmarks", while Riff's Mike DeWald thought it is strictly embedded in pop but signs of doo-wop and classic vocal standards are found throughout it. Lyrically, Timeless has a message of self-empowerment and positive self-talk found in Trainor's earlier music, inspired by her family, motherhood, and experiences in the music industry. She presents a feminist point of view on dating and emotional detachment in relationships, highlighting her concerns about the consequences of men's actions and societal misogyny while emphasizing women's empowerment.

=== Songs ===
"Whoops"
Timeless combines various genres, including doo-wop and bubblegum pop. "Whoops" is a pop-doo-wop song with influences of R&B.

The opening track, "To the Moon", is a minor key 1960s-style torch song which incorporates brass instrumentation, a compact groove, and club beats. It has space-themed lyrics inspired by Trainor's son's love of space and rocket ships. "Been Like This", a collaboration with T-Pain, begins with a jazz-influenced intro and transitions into a trumpet melody, combining hip-hop beats, synthesizers, and doo-wop with Charleston. "Crowded Room" is a doo-wop song that has the same "brassy sway" as Trainor's 2014 single "All About That Bass", but its harmonized vocals are distinct and "more quiet and intimate", according to DeWald. The fourth track, "Whoops", is a pop-doo-wop break-up song with influences of R&B, on which Trainor addresses an ex-partner and derides the woman who he cheated on her with.

"Crushin'", which features American band Lawrence, is a pop song with a covert rhythm that has lyrics about how the narrator has a crush on themself. The reggaeton and girl group-influenced "I Wanna Thank Me" is about self-love and encourages listeners to prioritize their mental health; it samples Nash's acceptance speech at the 75th Primetime Emmy Awards, where she thanked herself, incorporating background vocals from her wife and daughter. The seventh track, "Love On Hold", features Auto-Tuned vocals from T-Pain over a salsa-inspired production. "Forget How to Love" addresses Trainor's perception of an increase in online hate and someone who made her feel undeserving. The ninth track, "Rollin'", has Brill Building production which incorporates strings, bass, and brass instrumentation; in its feminist lyrics influenced by her experiences in the music industry, Trainor addresses society's hypocritical expectations for women and the misogyny and mansplaining they endure from men, according to South China Morning Post's Rhea Saxena. Both songs are influenced by modern R&B.

"I Don't Do Maybe" has horn instrumentation and a Latin and Cuban-influenced rhythm. The 11th track, "I Get It", is a pop song, followed by "Sleepin' on Me", which is a "return to that doo-wap/hip-pop hybrid style" according to Renowned for Sound's Graeme R. "Hate It Here" has lyrics about disliking being at a club, which are playful and sarcastic according to critics. "Bestie" is a club pop song which discusses self-love in the context of friendships over simplistic production, and "Doin' It All for You" is a 1980s synth-pop song. Timeless closes with the title track, a rhythmic ballad inspired by Trainor's death anxiety, which she also wanted to be a "beautiful love song" that could be played at a wedding or used to reminisce about a loved one who is away. The Target edition includes the additional track "Bite Me". The deluxe edition includes "Make a Move", "Criminals", and "Booty" featuring Paul Russell. In the lyrics of "Criminals", Trainor describes something that brings her so much satisfaction that she feels it must "be illegal".

== Release and promotion ==
Trainor and T-Pain released "Been Like This" as the lead single from the album on March 14, 2024. The same day, she announced that the album, titled Timeless, would be released on June 14, and she shared its official artwork on social media. In the cover photograph, Trainor wears lengthy black gloves and cobalt blue tights. "Been Like This" was sent for radio airplay in Italy on March 22, and it charted at number 40 in the United Kingdom and number 51 in Ireland. The second single, "To the Moon" was released on May 3, 2024, followed by a music video which featured appearances by her son, Sabara, Nash, Olsen, and influencers Brookie and Jessie. Trainor performed the songs during the 22nd season of American Idol on May 5.

Epic Records released the album on June 7, 2024. The same day, Trainor performed "Whoops" and a medley of "Been Like This" with "To the Moon" on Today. Initially refraining from promoting any songs to radio stations unless they gained popularity on TikTok, the label sent "Whoops" to them as the third single on June 24. A music video for the song was released on June 10, depicting her dancing in an empty room and destroying furniture with a baseball bat. The following day, Trainor reprised it on The Tonight Show Starring Jimmy Fallon. "Whoops" charted at number 94 in the United Kingdom and "I Wanna Thank Me" reached number 86. Trainor sang "I Wanna Thank Me" during iHeartRadio's Can't Cancel Pride 2024, and "Been Like This" and "Whoops" at Capital's Summertime Ball 2024.

The deluxe edition of Timeless was released on August 16, 2024. Its lead single, "Criminals", was sent for radio airplay in Italy on September 20 that year, and to contemporary hit radio stations in the United States four days later. The song gained popularity after being used as the theme in the Netflix miniseries The Perfect Couple (2024). It reached number 100 in the United States and number 92 in Canada. Timeless was supported by Trainor's first headlining concert tour in over seven years, The Timeless Tour, which began in Cincinnati in September 2024 and concluded in Inglewood, California, in October 2024. Natasha Bedingfield, Olsen, Russell, and Trainor's brother Ryan served as special guests. According to Pollstar, it was 98% sold out and grossed $14.1 million in revenue. Trainor performed "Been Like This" and "Criminals" at the 2024 KIIS-FM Jingle Ball.

== Critical reception ==
Professional ratings
Review scores
Source	Rating
AllMusic	4/5 stars
Riff	7/10
Sputnikmusic	2.1/5

Critics analyzed Timeless in the context of Trainor's previous material. DeWald believed that though she had always combined different genres in her music, the album featured "classic sounds" and the synthesis felt more intense. AllMusic's Matt Collar thought Trainor borrowed a bit from all musical styles she had tried in the past, hitting several stylistic notes that popularized her, and delivered a "frothy, confident, mixtape of an album". Likewise, Graeme R found it a great addition to Trainor's discography and believed it focused on her musical niche despite her venturing into some other genres. Benjamin Jack of Sputnikmusic described the album as a clear improvement from Takin' It Back, but he opined that it was devoid of a true sense of direction, and though Trainor leaned into the modern aspect of her sound, it was not interesting enough for a whole album.

They also commented on the songwriting and lyricism of Timeless. Collar believed that though doo-wop can be a whimsical and pastiche genre, the album was intelligently written and filled with melodic hooks that accentuate Trainor's talents as a pop songwriter as well as singer. DeWald thought it offered her brand new perspective after becoming a mother, placing emphasis on her family, and was consistently fresh throughout its duration. South China Morning Post's Rhea Saxena praised Timeless and believed it would empower young women to resist sexism and toxic relationships. On the other hand, Jack opined that poor lyricism and incohesion kept the album's friendly focus below its aspirations and the repetitive theme of love created redundancy. He thought that it displayed "flashes of songwriting prowess", but they were overshadowed by the production, doo-wop style, and "low points".

== Commercial performance ==
Upon its release, Timeless was the third-highest debut of the week in the United States and Australia. In the former, the album debuted at number 27 on the Billboard 200. It sold 12,000 pure sales, including 3,000 vinyl units, which constituted Trainor's biggest sales week since 2020 and her best week in vinyl sales. Timeless entered at number 48 on the Canadian Albums Chart. The album reached number 23 in Australia, becoming her fourth-highest peak on the chart. It became Trainor's third-highest-charting album in the UK and debuted at number 12, marking an improvement of 55 positions from Takin' It Back. Timeless charted at number 55 in Austria, number 97 in Switzerland, and number 158 in Belgium. The album lasted three weeks on the chart in Belgium, two in the United Kingdom and the United States, and one in Australia, Austria, Canada, and Switzerland.

== Track listing ==
Standard edition
No.	Title	Writer(s)	Producer(s)	Length
1.	"To the Moon"	Meghan Trainor; Jacob Kasher Hindlin; Federico Vindver	Vindver; M. Trainor^{[v]}	2:29
2.	"Been Like This" (with T-Pain)	M. Trainor; Faheem Najm; Kurt Thum; Ryan Trainor; Gian Stone; Grant Boutin	Stone; Boutin; Thum^{[a]}; M. Trainor^{[a]}^{[v]}; T-Pain^{[v]}	2:25
3.	"Crowded Room"	M. Trainor; Vindver; Emily Warren	Vindver; M. Trainor^{[a]}^{[v]}	2:24
4.	"Whoops"	M. Trainor; Stone; Boutin; Sean Douglas	Boutin; M. Trainor^{[v]}	2:28
5.	"Crushin'" (featuring Lawrence)	M. Trainor; Clyde Lawrence; Gracie Lawrence; Boutin; Jonny Koh; Jordan Cohen; Douglas	Boutin; M. Trainor^{[a]}^{[v]}	2:03
6.	"I Wanna Thank Me" (featuring Niecy Nash)	M. Trainor; Carol Nash; Hindlin; Vindver	Vindver; M. Trainor^{[a]}^{[v]}	2:23
7.	"Love on Hold" (featuring T-Pain)	M. Trainor; Najm; Boutin; R. Trainor; Justin Trainor	Boutin; M. Trainor^{[a]}^{[v]}	2:57
8.	"Forget How to Love"	M. Trainor; R. Trainor; J. Trainor; Scott Hoying	J. Trainor; M. Trainor^{[a]}^{[v]}; Hoying^{[v]}	3:18
9.	"Rollin'"	M. Trainor; Vindver; Hindlin	Vindver; M. Trainor^{[a]}^{[v]}	2:46
10.	"I Don't Do Maybe"	M. Trainor; Stone; Jason Evigan; Greg Evigan	J. Evigan; Stone; M. Trainor^{[a]}^{[v]}	2:30
11.	"I Get It"	M. Trainor; Hindlin; Vindver	Vindver; M. Trainor^{[a]}^{[v]}	3:05
12.	"Sleepin' on Me"	M. Trainor; Boutin; Scott Harris	Boutin; M. Trainor^{[a]}^{[v]}	3:02
13.	"Hate It Here"	M. Trainor; J. Trainor; Stone; Steph Jones	J. Trainor; Stone; M. Trainor^{[a]}^{[v]}	2:46
14.	"Bestie"	M. Trainor; Stone; Boutin; Douglas	Boutin; M. Trainor^{[a]}^{[v]}	3:11
15.	"Doin' It All for You"	M. Trainor; J. Trainor; R. Trainor; Boutin; Chris Gelbuda	J. Trainor; Boutin; M. Trainor^{[a]}^{[v]}	3:20
16.	"Timeless"	M. Trainor; Vindver; Stone; Douglas	Vindver; Stone; M. Trainor^{[a]}^{[v]}	3:13
Total length:				44:20

Target CD and digital special edition
No.	Title	Writer(s)	Producer(s)	Length
17.	"Bite Me"	M. Trainor; Vindver; Douglas	Vindver; J. Trainor^{[a]}; M. Trainor^{[v]}	2:51
Total length:				47:11

Tour CD edition
No.	Title	Writer(s)	Producer(s)	Length
1.	"Make a Move"	M. Trainor; Douglas; Stone; Boutin	Boutin	2:35
2.	"Criminals"	M. Trainor; Tyler Johnson; Josh Kear	J. Trainor	2:34
3.	"Crushin'" (featuring Lawrence)	M. Trainor; C. Lawrence; G. Lawrence; Boutin; Koh; Cohen; Douglas	Boutin; M. Trainor^{[a]}^{[v]}	2:03
4.	"Bestie"	M. Trainor; Stone; Boutin; Douglas	Boutin; M. Trainor^{[a]}^{[v]}	3:11
5.	"Booty" (featuring Paul Russell)	M. Trainor; Russell; Warren; R. Trainor; Vindver	Vindver	2:28
6.	"Whoops"	M. Trainor; Stone; Boutin; Douglas	Boutin; M. Trainor^{[v]}	2:28
7.	"I Wanna Thank Me" (featuring Niecy Nash)	M. Trainor; C. Nash; Hindlin; Vindver	Vindver; M. Trainor^{[a]}^{[v]}	2:23
8.	"Hate It Here"	M. Trainor; J. Trainor; Stone; Jones	J. Trainor; Stone; M. Trainor^{[a]}^{[v]}	2:46
9.	"Been Like This" (with T-Pain)	M. Trainor; Najm; Thum; R. Trainor; Stone; Boutin	Stone; Boutin; Thum^{[a]}; M. Trainor^{[a]}^{[v]}; T-Pain^{[v]}	2:25
10.	"To the Moon"	M. Trainor; Hindlin; Vindver	Vindver; M. Trainor^{[v]}	2:29
11.	"Timeless"	M. Trainor; Vindver; Stone; Douglas	Vindver; Stone; M. Trainor^{[a]}^{[v]}	3:13
12.	"Rollin'"	M. Trainor; Vindver; Hindlin	Vindver; M. Trainor^{[a]}^{[v]}	2:46
13.	"Love on Hold" (featuring T-Pain)	M. Trainor; Najm; Boutin; R. Trainor; J. Trainor	Boutin; M. Trainor^{[a]}^{[v]}	2:57
14.	"Crowded Room"	M. Trainor; Vindver; Warren	Vindver; M. Trainor^{[a]}^{[v]}	2:24
15.	"Doin' It All for You"	M. Trainor; J. Trainor; R. Trainor; Boutin; Gelbuda	J. Trainor; Boutin; M. Trainor^{[a]}^{[v]}	3:20
16.	"I Get It"	M. Trainor; Hindlin; Vindver	Vindver; M. Trainor^{[a]}^{[v]}	3:05
17.	"Forget How to Love"	M. Trainor; R. Trainor; J. Trainor; Hoying	J. Trainor; M. Trainor^{[a]}^{[v]}; Hoying^{[v]}	3:18
18.	"Sleepin' on Me"	M. Trainor; Boutin; Harris	Boutin; M. Trainor^{[a]}^{[v]}	3:02
19.	"I Don't Do Maybe"	M. Trainor; Stone; J. Evigan; G. Evigan	J. Evigan; Stone; M. Trainor^{[a]}^{[v]}	2:30
Total length:				51:57

Digital deluxe edition
No.	Title	Writer(s)	Producer(s)	Length
20.	"Bite Me"	M. Trainor; Vindver; Douglas	Vindver; J. Trainor^{[a]}; M. Trainor^{[v]}	2:51
Total length:				54:48

=== Notes ===
- ^{^[a]} signifies an additional producer.
- ^{^[v]} signifies a vocal producer.
- Two digital website exclusive editions were released: the first edition includes all standard edition tracks alongside sped-up versions, with the second edition including slowed down versions instead.

== Personnel ==
=== Musicians ===
- Meghan Trainor – lead vocals, background vocals (all tracks); percussion (track 7)
- Federico Vindver – programming (tracks 1, 3, 6, 9, 11, 16, 17), keyboards (1, 3, 6, 9, 11), electric guitar (3, 11), guitar (17), Mellotron (3), piano (6, 11, 16), drums (6, 17)
- Gian Stone – programming (tracks 2, 4, 10, 13, 16), background vocals (2, 4, 10, 13), keyboards (10, 12), electric guitar (10, 14), percussion (10)
- Grant Boutin – programming (tracks 2, 4, 5, 7, 12, 14, 15), background vocals (2, 4, 7, 12, 15), keyboards (4, 12, 14); electric guitar, percussion (7)
- T-Pain – lead vocals, background vocals (tracks 2, 7)
- Kurt Thum – programming (track 2)
- Jesse McGinty – trumpet (tracks 3, 6, 9–11, 16, 17), tuba (3, 6, 9, 11), trombone (3, 9–11, 16, 17), tenor saxophone (6, 9, 11, 16, 17), baritone saxophone (6, 11, 16, 17), euphonium (6), flugelhorn (9), saxophone (10, 16)
- Sean Douglas – background vocals (track 4), keyboards (5)
- Clyde Lawrence – background vocals, bass, organ, piano (track 5)
- Gracie Lawrence – lead vocals, background vocals (track 5)
- Jonny Koh – guitar (track 5)
- Jordan Cohen – saxophone, trumpet (track 5)
- Dia La Ren Nash – background vocals (track 6)
- Jessica Betts – background vocals (6)
- Niecy Nash – lead vocals, background vocals (track 6)
- Justin Trainor – background vocals (tracks 7, 8, 12, 13, 15), programming (13, 15, 17)
- Daryl Sabara – background vocals (tracks 7, 8, 13, 15)
- Ryan Trainor – background vocals (tracks 7, 8, 15)
- Scott Hoying – background vocals (tracks 8, 16)
- Jason Evigan – background vocals (track 10)
- Parris Fleming – trumpet (track 10)
- Guillermo Vadalá – bass (tracks 11, 16)
- Davide Rossi – cello, viola, violin (tracks 11, 17)
- Scott Harris – electric guitar (track 12)
- Steph Jones – background vocals (track 13)
- Chris Gelbuda – background vocals, electric guitar (track 15)
- Kiel Feher – drums (track 16)

=== Technical ===
- Randy Merrill – mastering
- Tom Norris – mixing (tracks 1–9, 11–16)
- Jeremie Inhaber – mixing (track 10)
- Justin Trainor – engineering (tracks 1–3, 5–16)
- Federico Vindver – engineering (tracks 1, 3, 6, 9, 11), arrangement (1)
- T-Pain – engineering (tracks 2, 7)
- Brian Starley – engineering (tracks 3, 6, 9, 11)
- Gian Stone – engineering (track 4)
- Grant Boutin – engineering (track 4)
- Meghan Trainor – vocal arrangement (track 8)
- Scott Hoying – vocal arrangement (track 8)

== Charts ==
Chart performance for Timeless
Chart (2024)	Peak position
Australian Albums (ARIA)	23
Austrian Albums (Ö3 Austria)	55
Belgian Albums (Ultratop Flanders)	158
Canadian Albums (Billboard)	48
Swiss Albums (Schweizer Hitparade)	97
UK Albums (Official Charts)	12
US Billboard 200	27

== Release history ==
Release dates and format(s) for Timeless
Region	Date	Format(s)	Label	Edition	Ref.
Various	June 7, 2024	CD; digital download; LP; streaming	Epic	Original	
Various	June 7, 2024	CD	Epic	Target	
Various	August 16, 2024	CD	Epic	Tour	
Various	August 16, 2024	Digital download; streaming	Epic	Deluxe	
