= The Perfect Couple (TV series) =

American mystery drama miniseries

- Promotional release poster
- Genre: Mystery; Crime drama
- Based on: The Perfect Couple by Elin Hilderbrand
- Developed by: Jenna Lamia
- Showrunner: Jenna Lamia
- Directed by: Susanne Bier
- Starring: Nicole Kidman; Liev Schreiber; Eve Hewson; Billy Howle; Meghann Fahy; Dakota Fanning; Sam Nivola; Ishaan Khatter; Jack Reynor
- Music by: Rupert Gregson-Williams
- Opening theme: "Criminals" by Meghan Trainor
- Country of origin: United States
- Original language: English
- No. of episodes: 6

Production
- Executive producers: Susanne Bier; Jenna Lamia; Shawn Levy; Josh Barry; Gail Berman; Hend Baghdady; Elin Hilderbrand; Nicole Kidman; Per Saari
- Producer: John Starke
- Cinematography: Roberto De Angelis; Shane Hurlbut
- Editors: Sam Williams; Morten Højbjerg
- Running time: 42–63 minutes
- Production companies: 21 Laps Entertainment; Pathless Woods Productions Inc.; Two–Four Two–Four Go; Blossom Films; The Jackal Group

Original release
- Network: Netflix
- Release: September 5, 2024

The Perfect Couple is an American mystery drama miniseries based on the 2018 novel by Elin Hilderbrand. Created by Jenna Lamia and directed by Susanne Bier, the series premiered on September 5, 2024, on Netflix. It stars an ensemble cast of Nicole Kidman, Liev Schreiber, Eve Hewson, Billy Howle, Meghann Fahy, Dakota Fanning, Sam Nivola, Ishaan Khatter, and Jack Reynor.

Set in Nantucket, it centers around a lavish wedding abruptly disrupted by a murder. It received mixed reviews from critics.

== Synopsis ==
Amelia (Eve Hewson) is about to marry into one of the wealthiest families on Nantucket until a shocking death derails the wedding—and turns everyone into a suspect.

== Cast and characters ==
=== Main ===
- Nicole Kidman as Greer Garrison Winbury, a famous novelist
- Liev Schreiber as Tag Winbury, Greer's husband
- Eve Hewson as Amelia Sacks, the bride
- Billy Howle as Benji Winbury, the groom, Greer and Tag's second son
- Meghann Fahy as Merritt Monaco, Amelia's best friend and maid of honor
- Dakota Fanning as Abby Winbury, Thomas' pregnant wife
- Sam Nivola as Will Winbury, Benji's younger brother
- Ishaan Khatter as Shooter Dival, Benji's best friend and best man
- Jack Reynor as Thomas Winbury, Benji's older brother

=== Recurring ===
- Donna Lynne Champlin as Nikki Henry, a detective from the Massachusetts State Police
- Michael Beach as Dan Carter, chief of the Nantucket Police Department
- Mia Isaac as Chloe Carter, Dan's daughter
- Isabelle Adjani as Isabel Nallet, a family friend of the Winburys
- Tim Bagley as Roger Pelton, Amelia and Benji's wedding planner
- Adina Porter as Enid Collins, Greer's editor
- Irina Dubova as Gosia, the Winbury family's housekeeper
- Dendrie Taylor as Karen Sacks, Amelia's mother
- Michael McGrady as Bruce Sacks, Amelia's father
- Nick Searcy as Deputy Carl
- Thomas Flanagan as Broderick Graham, Greer's brother

== Episodes ==
| No. | Title | Directed by | Written by | Original release date |
|---|---|---|---|---|
| 1 | "Happy Wedding Eve" | Susanne Bier | Jenna Lamia | September 5, 2024 |
Greer Winbury is a rich author with three children and a seemingly perfect marriage. It is the day of the rehearsal dinner for her son Benji, who will marry Amelia. The wedding is supposed to occur at the Winbury family's Summerland mansion by the water in Nantucket, where the rehearsal dinner is also hosted. It is revealed that there has been a murder, and the local police are investigating. Amelia has invited her best friend Merritt to the wedding as her maid of honor, who arrives with Shooter, the best man, and the groom's best friend. Amelia observes Merritt and Shooter being playful together and looks at Shooter longingly. She also reveals to her best friend Merritt that she does not feel addicted to Benji, as a woman about to be married should. Meanwhile, Greer reveals to Benji that she is not fond of Amelia and is unsure if Amelia loves Benji. Benji stands up to his mother to fight for Amelia. It is revealed that Merritt is the murder victim. Amelia is the first to find Merritt's body on the beach and goes into shock upon realizing she is dead.
| 2 | "She Would Never Do That" | Susanne Bier | Jenna Lamia and Bryan M. Holdman | September 5, 2024 |
As the investigation into Merritt's death begins, Shooter tries to leave the island but is apprehended by the police. Abby also desires to leave but is prevented by her husband, Thomas, Benji's older brother. Meanwhile, to protect her family and her career, Greer wants to release a statement claiming the death was a suicide, which Amelia reluctantly agrees with. Flashbacks reveal that Amelia learned about Merritt's affair with Tag (which had resulted in a pregnancy) shortly before Merritt's death, which she later admits to the police. Greer had also deduced that Merritt was Tag's mistress from her expensive bracelet.
| 3 | "The Perfect Family" | Susanne Bier | Jenna Lamia and Leila Cohan | September 5, 2024 |
Amelia speculates to the police that Merritt must have loved Tag for her to carry on an affair. Later that night, Greer catches Amelia looking in Tag's office. Greer tries to keep up appearances for a People magazine interview. Benji's younger brother, Will, sneaks off to visit Chloe; flashbacks reveal that the two had sneaked off during the rehearsal and that Will had injured his hand. Abby advises Amelia to stay out of Greer's crosshairs and tells her about Mae Pratt, a tutor of Will's who disappeared; Benji dodges the questioning when Amelia asks him about it. Tag acts romantic during the interview, to Greer's frustration. Police Chief Carter and Detective Henry find a voicemail from Benji on Merritt's phone. Henry tells Carter that the family's money is mostly tied up in trusts, and Greer's book sales finance most of their expenses. After Shooter is released from police custody, Amelia observes him assuring Greer of the money. At dinner, Amelia demands to know what happened to Mae. Thomas reveals that Mae attempted to die by suicide after Tag broke off their affair, and Tag and Greer pressured her into settling. Henry learns that Will's prints were on the oyster knife, and his blood was found on the sand along with Merritt's. Will takes off on a boat on a stormy night; Amelia finds Merritt's bracelet in the search.
| 4 | "Someone Could Get Hurt" | Susanne Bier | Jenna Lamia and Courtney Grace & Evelyn Yves | September 5, 2024 |
Amelia reports she found Merritt's bracelet among Will's belongings to the police. The coast guard picks Will up, and Carter questions him about Merritt and the bracelet. He admits that he had learned of Merritt and Tag's affair and the baby, and that he picked up the bracelet later that night; he had also cut his hand shucking oysters. Flashbacks reveal that Amelia and Shooter properly met after spending a few hours alone in an empty Summerland. Abby fields a call from Broderick Graham, which Greer ignores. Amelia confronts Benji about photographs of Merritt that he had hidden and his knowledge of the affair. Benji and Thomas get into an altercation over the wedding cake. Tag and Greer sleep together, and she turns in the bracelet receipt to the police. Amelia and Shooter kiss, but Benji catches them.
| 5 | "Never Gonna Give You Up" | Susanne Bier | Jenna Lamia and Alex Berger | September 5, 2024 |
The family attends Greer's book launch; Abby and Isabel, a family friend of the Winburys, comfort Amelia. Tag insists to the police that he was not responsible for Merritt's death, nor does he know who was, and that his smartwatch proves he was in bed at 2:30 a.m., hours before the barbiturates could have entered her system. Flashbacks show that shortly before Merritt's death, she and Tag had an argument in the water about terminating the pregnancy. Isabel also says she spoke with Merritt after she argued with Tag. Amelia has sex with a drunk Benji in the kitchen, which she later admits to Shooter. An intoxicated Tag gets onstage at the book launch and rants about his marriage. At the station, Henry realizes that Greer was phoning Broderick Graham, a European criminal, around three o'clock in the morning, and that Shooter had paid Broderick $300,000.
| 6 | "That Feels Better" | Susanne Bier | Jenna Lamia | September 5, 2024 |
As Greer and her team ponder how to spin the launch incident and reporters swarm Summerland, the police take her in for questioning, theorizing that she hired Broderick to kill Merritt and had Shooter, who has diplomatic immunity—pay for the hit. Abby confronts Thomas about his relationship with Isabel, and Amelia calls Shooter to apologize for her uncertainty. Greer confesses to her family and agent that Broderick is her brother and the money was to cover his debts. She admits that she was an escort when she met Tag. Amelia's mother had brought pentobarbital pills, but one pill was missing. Thomas stole the pill and initially planned to scare Merritt into aborting the pregnancy, as the sons' access to the family trust would be delayed by 18 years if Tag were to sire another child. Isabel produces video evidence that she and Thomas were together at the time of the death, which contradicts Abby's testimony that Thomas was in bed. Abby is revealed to have killed Merritt and is arrested for her crime while the family recovers, and Amelia and Benji break off their engagement and go their separate ways. Months later, Greer finds Amelia in London and presents her with the manuscript of her new book, and the two agree to meet up sometime.

== Production ==
=== Development ===
In 2019, an adaptation of Elin Hilderbrand's The Perfect Couple (2018) was initially in development at Fox Entertainment. Jenna Lamia was announced as the project's screenwriter in December 2019. By August 2022, Netflix greenlit the adaptation as a six-part miniseries, with Lamia serving as showrunner and Susanne Bier as director. Lamia, Bier, and Hilderbrand, joined Nicole Kidman and Per Saari (Blossom Films), Shawn Levy and Josh Barry (21 Laps Entertainment), and Gail Berman and Hend Baghdady (The Jackal Group) as executive producers.

Several changes were made from the novel, including renaming the bride from Celeste Otis to Amelia Sacks. Lamia disclosed that modifications were made to distinguish the series from Big Little Lies, a decision influenced by Kidman's involvement. Notably, the series also features a different ending from the novel's murder mystery conclusion. Bier later revealed that she turned down directing The Night Manager Season 2 to helm The Perfect Couple.

=== Casting ===
In March 2023, reports emerged that Nicole Kidman, Liev Schreiber, Dakota Fanning, and several other potential cast members were set to star in the series. Later, Kidman, Schreiber, and Fanning were confirmed, with Eve Hewson and Billy Howle also joining the cast. The remaining ensemble included Ishaan Khattar, Jack Reynor, Sam Nivola, Mia Isaac, Donna Lynne Champlin, and Isabelle Adjani.

=== Filming ===
Principal photography for The Perfect Couple was scheduled from April to June 2023 in Massachusetts, with filming locations including Chatham, Eastward Point, Harwich, and various spots around Cape Cod. Filming in Nantucket and Chatham was picketed in September 2023 by striking members of the SAG-AFTRA unions.

After the cast returned to set following an eight-month hiatus due to the 2023 WGA and SAG-AFTRA strike, director Susanne Bier proposed a flashmob-style dance sequence for the opening credits. Though initially rejected by the cast, the sequence was later choreographed by Charm La'Donna.

== Reception ==
=== Critical response ===
The review aggregator website Rotten Tomatoes reported a 66% approval rating with an average rating of 6.1/10, based on 73 critic reviews. The website's critics' consensus reads, "Predictability keeps The Perfect Couple far from being perfect, but intriguing performances and attractive vistas keep this seaside murder mystery highly watchable." Metacritic, which uses a weighted average, assigned a score of 67 out of 100 based on 26 critics, indicating "generally favorable reviews".

Lucy Mangan of The Guardian praised the series for its well-crafted plot, noting that the twists and reveals are perfectly timed, making it hard to stop watching after starting. She highlighted Donna Lynne Champlin's portrayal of detective Nikki Henry, calling her "the star of the show." Nick Hilton of The Independent criticized the series for its fast pace and lack of depth, noting that the hurried storytelling makes the non-linear timeline feel disjointed. He drew comparisons to Big Little Lies, stating that the series lacks the tension and intrigue of that drama, leaving viewers with a portrayal of flawed lives that feels equally flawed and unfulfilled. Dan Einav from the Financial Times noted that the series feels predictable, often compared to Big Little Lies and The White Lotus, but it falls short on emotional depth and sharp wit. Despite its familiar take on themes like privilege and family dynamics, along with a somewhat exaggerated plot and characters, the strong performances and direction make it an entertaining summer show.

Tania Hussain of Collider observed that the series effectively blended dark comedy and suspense, creating a gripping, unpredictable narrative. Nicole Kidman and Eve Hewson gave nuanced performances, while sharp social commentary and stunning visuals enhanced the themes of privilege and power. However, the rushed ending leaves some plotlines unresolved, slightly diminishing the overall impact. Saloni Gajjar of A.V. Club noted that despite a talented cast and beautiful setting, the series falls flat, weighed down by clichés and lacking depth. Although Kidman was expected to deliver a standout performance, the show was underwhelming, with no performances truly standing out. Jack Reynor and Dakota Fanning appeared to enjoy their roles. Still, it felt like the cast prioritized a luxurious Nantucket getaway, resulting in a confusing final product, similar to some of Kidman's recent TV projects.

Kristen Baldwin of Entertainment Weekly noted that the show relied heavily on the absurd trope of characters casually making quips and coy remarks during police interrogations. However, the series signaled that neither it nor its characters should be taken too seriously. Benji Wilson of The Telegraph described the series as "top-notch trash," delivering a satisfying, addictive experience in almost every scene. He compared it to Big Little Lies set on the East Coast, The White Lotus with a Count of Monte Cristo twist in Nantucket, and And Then There Were None with private jets. Aramide Tinubu of Variety observed that despite a nonsensical plot and limited depth, the series remained enjoyable and highly watchable, thanks to its magnetic star power and intriguing elements.

Kayleigh Donaldson of The Wrap agreed with other critics about the series' similarity to Kidman's previous work but found it a highly bingeable show poised for social media buzz. She also noted Kidman's winning TV formula, in which she consistently portrayed privileged women in domestic peril, creating a distinct genre that she adhered to in each new glossy miniseries. In a more critical review, Ben Travers of IndieWire criticized the series for its lack of care and effort, evident in both the opening titles and the episodes. He noted that the show relied on star power, expecting viewers to like the characters simply because they're played by celebrities, rather than acknowledging their flaws despite their glamorous lives. Travers suggested that the show "is made to look like a good time — and maybe it can be, if you bring your own party — but there's even less here than meets the eye".

Angie Han of The Hollywood Reporter criticized the series for struggling to find its voice, often resembling other shows. While she praised Fanning's performance, noting her portrayal of Abby as both terrifying and hilarious, she felt the character lacked depth and disconnected from the rest of the cast, especially Kidman. Cristina Escobar of RogerEbert.com suggested that viewers weigh their fondness for Kidman before committing to six hours with these unpleasant characters, pointing out that there may be better viewing choices available.

=== Audience viewership ===
During the September 2–8 viewing window, The Perfect Couple became Netflix's top series, accumulating 20.3 million views within its first four days. It maintained its #1 position, garnering 21.9 million views the following week (September 9–15). After leading the charts for two consecutive weeks, the series dropped to the second-most-watched TV show for the period of September 16–22, adding another 10.4 million views, according to Netflix's Top 10 rankings. The series gained an additional 6 million views and ranked #3 for the week of September 23–29. During the week of September 30 – October 6 and October 7–13, it added another 3.8 million views, ranked #5 and 2.5 million views, ranked #8, respectively.

According to Luminate Film & TV Streaming Viewership, the series ranked as the #1 most-watched streaming original series in the U.S. for the weeks of September 6–12 and September 13–19. The series slipped to the #2 and #5 spot during the week of September 20–26 and September 27 – October 3, respectively.

The Perfect Couple was one of five titles to surpass a billion minutes of viewing during the week of September 2–8, achieving the fifth-highest total for any original series premiere week on the streaming charts in 2024, according to Nielsen's latest data, measuring the U.S. views on TV sets only. It maintained its first and fifth position on Nielsen's streaming charts for the weeks of September 9–15 and September 23–29, respectively. The series dropped to the #9 position during the week of September 30 – October 6.

The series placed #2 in the top 10 TV shows on Netflix for the second half of 2024.

=== Accolades ===
The series appeared on multiple critics and editors' lists of the best TV of 2024, including:

- Top 20 – GQ
- Top 26 – Glamour

== Accolades ==
| Year | Award ceremony | Category | Nominee | Result | Ref. |
|---|---|---|---|---|---|
| 2024 | 30th Critics' Choice Awards | Best Supporting Actor in a Movie/Miniseries | Liev Schreiber | Won | |

== Future ==
Although the finale resolved the murder mystery, Kidman believes there's still more to explore with Greer and Tag's story in a potential future season. Lamia also expressed openness to a continuation, stating it could happen if the right elements aligned and everyone involved was enthusiastic about returning. Hilderbrand, when asked about a second season, admitted that six episodes were not sufficient to explore the characters in depth fully. On March 12, 2025, it was announced that a second season was in development.

== Impact ==
Following the release of the series' teaser in July, the book's sales surged by over 400%, with audiobook sales topping the suspense genre and reaching fifth place overall on Amazon. Print sales increased by 250%, propelling the book back onto The New York Times bestseller list six years after its original publication.

Additionally, Meghan Trainor's song "Criminals" saw a 1770% spike in Spotify streams, reaching 2.6 million iTunes streams within a week, prompting her to incorporate the viral track in her tour setlist.
