= Criminals (Meghan Trainor song) =

- Remix cover

Single by Meghan Trainor

from the album Timeless (Deluxe)
- Released: September 20, 2024
- Length: 2:34
- Label: Epic
- Songwriters: Meghan Trainor; Tyler Johnson; Josh Kear
- Producer: Justin Trainor

Meghan Trainor singles chronology
"Chasin'" (2024)	"Criminals" (2024)	"Mind Reader" (2025)

Audio video
- "Criminals" on YouTube

"Criminals" is a song by American singer-songwriter Meghan Trainor from the deluxe edition of her sixth major-label studio album, Timeless (2024). Trainor wrote it with songwriters Tyler Johnson and Josh Kear, and her brother Justin handled production. The song was initially written for her third major-label studio album, Treat Myself (2020), but was not included on it after Trainor rewrote the album to make it a pop record that feels relevant in an era when hip-hop reigns. "Criminals" became available as Timeless's deluxe edition's second track on August 16, 2024, when it was released by Epic Records. Sony Music released the song as the deluxe edition's lead single on September 20, 2024.

"Criminals" reached number 100 on the Billboard Hot 100 and number 92 on the Canadian Hot 100. The song peaked at number five on the Polish Airplay Top 100, in the top 10 on the Adult Pop Airplay and the top 20 of the Pop Airplay charts in the US. It also reached the top twenty on digital sales charts in the US and UK. "Criminals" gained popularity after becoming the opening theme for the 2024 Netflix miniseries The Perfect Couple. Critical reception focused on the song's usage in the show's dance sequence, with some finding it catchy. Trainor included it on the set list of her 2024 concert tour, the Timeless Tour.

== Background ==
Meghan Trainor began recording songs for her third major-label studio album, Treat Myself (2020), while still recovering from her second vocal cord surgery. She wrote a track called "Call Us Criminals" with songwriters Tyler Johnson and Josh Kear. In January 2018, Trainor stated that it was her favorite song on the album, which she called her "best work yet" two months later. In 2024, Trainor recalled that the song was written seven years ago, and she immediately thought it "was a smash". Her team asked her not to put it on the album, and Trainor held onto it in hopes that it could have a "special moment" in the future. She eventually rewrote Treat Myself four times to make it a pop record that feels relevant in an era when hip-hop reigns.

Trainor returned to her doo-wop sound on her fifth major-label studio album, Takin' It Back (2022), after the song "Title" attained viral popularity on video-sharing service TikTok in 2021. The album included the single "Made You Look", which went viral on TikTok and became her highest-charting single in years. Trainor continued the sound on her sixth major-label studio album, Timeless (2024), which was identified by critics as a doo-wop and bubblegum pop record. "Criminals" became available as the album's deluxe edition's second track on August 16, 2024, when it was released by Epic Records. Sony Music sent the song for radio airplay in Italy as the deluxe edition's lead single on September 20, 2024. Epic sent it to contemporary hit radio stations in the United States four days later. Trainor included "Criminals" on the set list of her 2024 concert tour, the Timeless Tour. On October 24, 2024, an extended play containing Chromeo, Ellis, and J.Bird's remixes of the song was released alongside its live performance from the tour's Madison Square Garden stop.

== Composition ==
"Criminals" is 2 minutes and 34 seconds long. Trainor's brother Justin produced and programmed the song, and he engineered it with Andrew Wells and Bo Bodnar. Wells and Taubenfeld play guitar. Johnson, Kear, Bodnar, Trainor and her brother Ryan, and Daryl Sabara provided background vocals. Trainor handled vocal production, Randy Merrill mastered the song, and Jeremie Inhaber mixed it. Wells provided additional production.

In the lyrics of "Criminals", Trainor acknowledges that she has behaved in a bad way but intends to repeat this, and she addresses a partner as her best one ever: "Lock me up cause I've been bad, and I know I'll do it again / You're the best I ever had, I'm guilty, I confess." Trainor continues to discuss a romantic relationship in subsequent lyrics and believes that the satisfaction it brings her must equate to a crime because of how good it is: "Anything that feels this good / Well, it must be illegal, it must be illegal, illegal."

== Inclusion in The Perfect Couple ==
"Criminals" appears as the theme song in the American mystery drama miniseries The Perfect Couple (2024). Susanne Bier wanted to incorporate a dance sequence with the show's cast into its opening sequence, and she liked "Criminals" from a list of songs sent by the music supervisor. Charm La'Donna created a choreography set to it. Bier believed that the repetition of the words "Call us criminals, criminals" would lead viewers to speculate even more about who might be the culprit in the plotline's murder. Trainor expressed excitement about its inclusion in the show and the dance sequence: "It has been a life long dream of mine to have one of my songs be used as the intro for a show and to have this many icons dancing along is just too good to be true." Many cast members objected to the dance sequence and even created a WhatsApp group to avoid doing it, but they ended up enjoying it after the filming.

Capital's Katie Louise Smith believed the song succeeded in fulfilling Bier's intention and stimulated viewers to think more about the perpetrator of the murder: "It worked out perfectly to set the tone of the entire show. The routine serves as a perfect closer for the series too." Dusty Baxter-Wright of Cosmopolitan referred to the dance routine and "Criminals" as "both catchy and a little bit jarring". Writing for Glamour, Stephanie McNeal stated: "Every time the song and dance routine would come on, we'd groove on the couch, attempting the moves (badly) and singing the song. Predictably, the song soon got hopelessly stuck in my head."

== Commercial performance ==
The inclusion of "Criminals" in The Perfect Couple caused its Spotify streams to increase by 1770% in the period between the show's release and the last week of September, prompting Trainor to add it to the set list of the Timeless Tour. The song debuted at number 100 on the Billboard Hot 100 issued for November 23, 2024. It peaked at numbers 10 and 13 on the Adult Pop Airplay and Pop Airplay charts in the US, respectively. "Criminals" entered at number 19 on the Digital Song Sales chart. In Canada, the song peaked at number 92 on the Canadian Hot 100.

"Criminals" reached number 18 on the UK Singles Downloads Chart and number 19 on Singles Sales. The song entered at number 21 on the New Zealand Hot Singles chart. It charted at number five on the Polish Airplay Top 100. "Criminals" also peaked at number 11 on San Marino's SMRTV Top 50 Airplay chart, number 40 on Lithuania Airplay and Commonwealth of Independent States Airplay, and number 54 on the Russian Airplay chart.

== Credits and personnel ==
Credits are adapted from the liner notes of Timeless (Deluxe).

- Justin Trainor – producer, engineer, programming
- Meghan Trainor – lead vocals, background vocals, songwriter, vocal producer
- Tyler Johnson – songwriter, background vocals
- Josh Kear – songwriter, background vocals
- Andrew Wells – engineer, guitar, additional producer
- Drew Taubenfeld – guitar
- Bo Bodnar – engineer, background vocals
- Ryan Trainor – background vocals
- Daryl Sabara – background vocals
- Randy Merrill – mastering
- Jeremie Inhaber – mixing

== Charts ==
=== Weekly charts ===
Weekly chart performance for "Criminals"
Chart (2024–2025)	Peak position
Belarus Airplay (TopHit)	64
Canada Hot 100 (Billboard)	92
Canada CHR/Top 40 (Billboard)	23
CIS Airplay (TopHit)	40
Kazakhstan Airplay (TopHit)	80
Latvia Airplay (TopHit)	176
Lithuania Airplay (TopHit)	40
Malta Airplay (Radiomonitor)	10
New Zealand Hot Singles (RMNZ)	21
Poland (Polish Airplay Top 100)	5
Russia Airplay (TopHit)	54
San Marino Airplay (SMRTV Top 50)	11
Serbia Airplay (Radiomonitor)	6
Slovakia Airplay (ČNS IFPI)	53
UK Singles Downloads (Official Charts)	18
UK Singles Sales (OCC)	19
US Billboard Hot 100	100
US Adult Pop Airplay (Billboard)	10
US Pop Airplay (Billboard)	13

=== Monthly charts ===
Monthly chart performance for "Criminals"
Chart (2024)	Peak position
Belarus Airplay (TopHit)	78
CIS Airplay (TopHit)	52
Lithuania Airplay (TopHit)	80
Russia Airplay (TopHit)	79

=== Year-end charts ===
2024 year-end chart performance for "Criminals"
Chart (2024)	Position
Poland (Polish Airplay Top 100)	59

2025 year-end chart performance for "Criminals"
Chart (2025)	Position
US Adult Pop Airplay (Billboard)	36
US Pop Airplay (Billboard)	48

== Release history ==
Release dates and formats for "Criminals"
Region	Date	Format	Version	Label	Ref.
Italy	September 20, 2024	Radio airplay	Original	Sony	
United States	September 24, 2024	Contemporary hit radio	Original	Epic	
Various	October 24, 2024	Digital download; streaming	Remixes	Epic	
