= Paul Russell (musician) =

American rapper, singer and songwriter (born 1997)

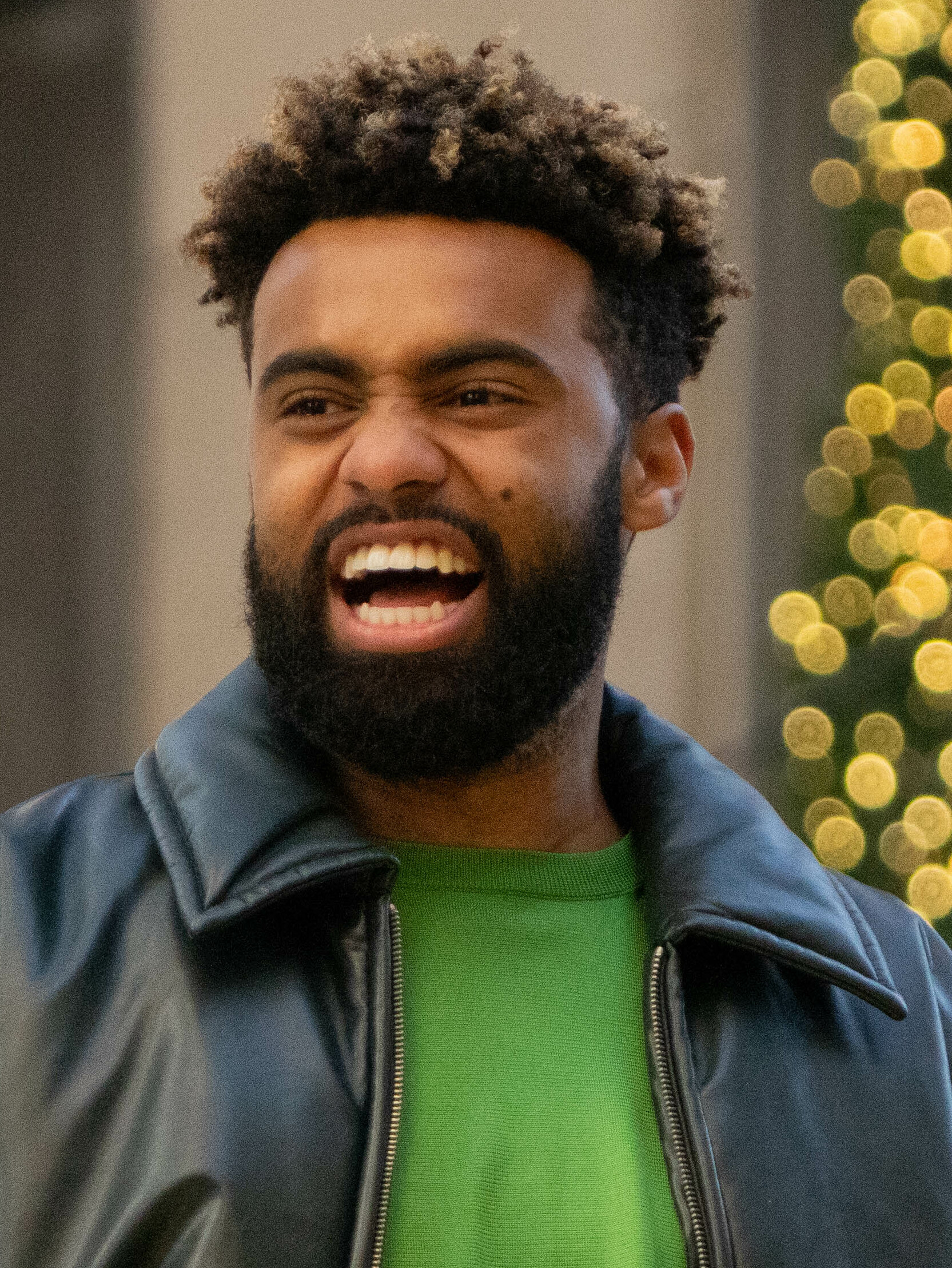
- Russell at the 2023 Macy's Thanksgiving Day Parade

Background information
- Born: Paul Jeffrey Russell; August 31, 1997 (age 29)
- Origin: Atlanta, Georgia, U.S. Allen, Texas, U.S.
- Education: Cornell University (BS)
- Genres: Pop-rap; R&B
- Occupations: Rapper; singer; songwriter
- Years active: 2018–present
- Label: Arista

Paul Jeffrey Russell (born August 31, 1997) is an American rapper, singer and songwriter based in Los Angeles. He is best known for his 2023 single "Lil Boo Thang", which peaked at number 14 on the Billboard Hot 100. After the song gained virality on TikTok, he signed with Arista Records to release it as a commercial single for the label. Before his music career, Russell worked as a business analyst and corporate advertiser.

== Early life and education ==
Russell was born in 1997. He grew up in the suburbs of Atlanta but attended Allen High School in Allen, Texas. During his adolescence, he started listening to alternative rock, while also being exposed to Christian hip-hop, mainly through Lecrae's music.

Russell graduated from Cornell University in 2019 with a Bachelor of Science degree in industrial relations. Upon relocating to Los Angeles later that year, Russell started working at a brand consultancy.

== Career ==
=== 2018–2022: Career beginnings ===
While still in college, Russell started making music as Paulitics, uploading his first full songs on SoundCloud. He was later approached by Christian hip-hop artist Ruslan, the co-founder and owner of Christian hip-hop label Kings Dream Entertainment, who had discovered Russell's music through his friend and former schoolmate Jet Trouble, a fellow Kings Dream signee. He subsequently started collaborating with Ruslan and other artists from the label, while completing an internship at Vans as part of his academic coursework.

In August 2018, Russell officially signed to Kings Dream Entertainment as an artist, and released his first commercial single, "Meet Me Outside". On October 12 of the same year, Russell released his first project through Kings Dream, Via Text, a joint album with Ruslan. In November of the same year, he featured on Reach Records' Christmas compilation The Gift: A Christmas Compilation, appearing with Abe Parker and Lecrae on the song "We Three Kings".

On March 29, 2019, Russell released his debut solo album, Once in a Dry Season, through Kings Dream, which included features from the likes of Ruslan, Jon Keith and Montell Fish. In January 2020, he was included in the online Christian hip-hop magazine Rapzilla's annual Freshmen List. Beginning later the same year, he started promoting his music through his TikTok profile. From 2021 onwards, Russell released a number of singles through independent label Boom.Records. In August 2021, he featured on Reach Records' compilation Summer '21, on the song "Never Give Up" alongside Tedashii. In July 2022, he featured on the same label's compilation Summer Twenty-Two, on the song "Wouldn't U Rather" with together with DJ Mykael V and Jon Keith.

=== 2023–present: "Lil Boo Thang" and commercial breakthrough ===
On June 28, 2023, Russell first previewed a snippet of his track "Lil Boo Thang" on TikTok; the clip went viral on the platform the following month, and he subsequently agreed to sign a deal with Arista Records to release the song as a full commercial single. "Lil Boo Thang" was officially released on August 18 of the same year; the single debuted on the US Billboard Hot 100 at number 99 in September 2023, marking Russell's first appearance on the chart, and went on to peak at number 14 in January 2024. As a result of the song's success, he went on to make live guest appearances at the Macy's Thanksgiving Day Parade, on Jimmy Kimmel Live! and on Dick Clark's New Year's Rockin' Eve in the following months.

On January 26, 2024, Russell released his second single through Arista Records, "Say Cheese". Later that year, Russell was announced as an opening act supporting Meghan Trainor on The Timeless Tour. In July 2024, Russell released the single "Slippin'" featuring Trainor.

In an Instagram post on August 15, 2024, Russell announced that again sometime?, an EP about a newly-famous musician returning to his hometown and wooing his high school sweetheart, would be released at the end of the month. "Homecoming", the lead single from the project, was released on August 16.

== Personal life ==
Russell is married and resides in Los Angeles. His older sister, Caress Akon, appeared on the sixth season of The Circle, where she posed as Russell.

== Discography ==
=== Solo albums ===
List of solo albums, with selected details
Title	Details
Once in a Dry Season	Released: March 29, 2019; Label: Kings Dream Entertainment

=== Collaborative albums ===
List of collaborative albums, with selected details
Title	Details
Via Text (with Ruslan)	Released: October 10, 2018; Label: Kings Dream Entertainment

=== Extended plays ===
List of extended plays, with selected details
Title	Details
Again Sometime?	Released: August 30, 2024; Label: Arista Records

=== Singles ===
==== As lead artist ====
List of singles as lead artist, with selected chart positions and certifications
Title	Year	Peak chart positions									Certifications	Album
Title	Year	US	US Adult Pop	US Pop	US Rhy.	AUS	CAN	IRE	UK	WW	Certifications	Album
"Get Back" (with Ruslan)	2018	—	—	—	—	—	—	—	—	—		Via Text
"Breeze" (with Ruslan)	2018	—	—	—	—	—	—	—	—	—		Via Text
"Birthday" (with Ruslan)	2018	—	—	—	—	—	—	—	—	—		Via Text
"Kalamazoo" (featuring Jon Keith and TrossTheGiant)	2019	—	—	—	—	—	—	—	—	—		Once in a Dry Season
"45th Avenue Interlude" (featuring Ruslan and Jon Keith)	2019	—	—	—	—	—	—	—	—	—		Once in a Dry Season
"Open Road"	2019	—	—	—	—	—	—	—	—	—		Once in a Dry Season
"Feels Like a Dream"	2019	—	—	—	—	—	—	—	—	—		Once in a Dry Season
"Kimbo Slice"	2019	—	—	—	—	—	—	—	—	—		Once in a Dry Season
"Find My Way" (with Oh-So featuring Kaleb Mitchell)	2019	—	—	—	—	—	—	—	—	—		Non-album singles
"Friends" (with Ruslan)	2019	—	—	—	—	—	—	—	—	—		Non-album singles
"Julio Jones"	2019	—	—	—	—	—	—	—	—	—		Non-album singles
"Personal Brand" (with Foggieraw)	2020	—	—	—	—	—	—	—	—	—		Non-album singles
"Facetime (4G LTE)" (with Kuwada)	2020	—	—	—	—	—	—	—	—	—		Non-album singles
"Hallelujah"	2021	—	—	—	—	—	—	—	—	—		Non-album singles
"Nose Job" (with Wes Walker)	2021	—	—	—	—	—	—	—	—	—		Non-album singles
"Jeans"	2022	—	—	—	—	—	—	—	—	—		Non-album singles
"Glossier"	2022	—	—	—	—	—	—	—	—	—		Non-album singles
"H4U"	2022	—	—	—	—	—	—	—	—	—		Non-album singles
"Ms. Poli Sci"	2022	—	—	—	—	—	—	—	—	—		Non-album singles
"Be That Too"	2023	—	—	—	—	—	—	—	—	—		Non-album singles
"Lil Boo Thang" (solo or Galantis remix)	2023	14	2	5	8	11	5	28	20	79	RIAA: 2× Platinum; ARIA: Platinum; BPI: Platinum; MC: 2x Platinum	Again Sometime?
"Say Cheese"	2024	—	—	—	—	—	—	—	—	—		Again Sometime?
"Eat Pray Love"	2024	—	—	—	—	—	—	—	—	—		Non-album single
"Slippin'" (featuring Meghan Trainor)	2024	—	—	—	—	—	—	—	—	—		Again Sometime?
"Homecoming"	2024	—	—	—	—	—	—	—	—	—		Again Sometime?
"That Girl" (featuring Saweetie)	2025	—	—	—	—	—	—	—	—	—		Non-album single
"High Maintenance"	2026	—	—	—	34	—	—	—	—	—		Miracle Mile
"—" denotes a recording that did not chart or was not released in that territory.

==== As featured artist ====
List of singles as featured artist
Title	Year
"Reminiscing" (Oh-So with Paul Russell and Lawren)	2019
"Somebody New" (Abe Parker with Paul Russell)	2020
"Sushi" (Cole Tindal with Paul Russell and TrossTheGiant)	2021
"Goodbye" (Shanin Blake with Paul Russell)	2021
"Never Give Up" (166 with Paul Russell and Tedashii)	2021
"Yours!" (Barely Trev with Paul Russell)	2022
"Confessions" (Flo Rida with Paul Russell and Enhypen's Heeseung and Jake)	2025

=== Guest appearances ===
List of other appearances, showing year released, other artist(s) credited and album name
Title	Year	Other artist(s)	Album
"We Three Kings"	2018	Lecrae and Abe Parker	The Gift
"Chaotic"	2023	—N/a	Good Burger 2
"Booty"	2024	Meghan Trainor	Timeless (Deluxe)

== Tours ==
=== Opening act ===
- Meghan Trainor — The Timeless Tour (2024)

== Awards and nominations ==
	Award	Category	Nominee(s)	Result	Ref.
2024	Kids' Choice Awards	Favorite Social Music Star	Paul Russell	Nominated	
2024	Kids' Choice Awards	Favorite Viral Song	"Lil Boo Thang"	Nominated	
