= Been Like This =

Single by Meghan Trainor and T-Pain

from the album Timeless
- Released: March 14, 2024
- Genre: Doo-wop
- Length: 2:25
- Label: Epic
- Songwriters: Meghan Trainor; Faheem Najm; Kurt Thum; Ryan Trainor; Gian Stone; Grant Boutin
- Producers: Gian Stone; Grant Boutin

Meghan Trainor singles chronology
"Wrap Me Up" (2023)	"Been Like This" (2024)	"To the Moon" (2024)

T-Pain singles chronology
"Biggest Booty" (2024)	"Been Like This" (2024)	"On This Hill" (2024)

Music video
- "Been Like This" on YouTube

"Been Like This" is a song by American singer-songwriters Meghan Trainor and T-Pain from the former's sixth major-label studio album, Timeless (2024). They co-wrote the song with Kurt Thum, Trainor's brother Ryan, and its producers, Gian Stone and Grant Boutin. Epic Records released it as the album's lead single on March 14, 2024. A doo-wop song with contemporary influences, it incorporates a jazz intro and trumpet melody and has lyrics about confidence.

"Been Like This" reached numbers 15 and 24 on the Adult Pop Airplay and Pop Airplay charts in the US, respectively. The song also peaked at number 40 in the UK and number 51 in Ireland. Phillip R Lopez and Lauren Dunn directed its music video, which was choreographed by Charm La'Donna. It features Trainor alongside background dancers, performing a dance routine afront a space-themed background. She sang the song during the 22nd season of American Idol, on Today and Capital's Summertime Ball, and she included it on the set list of her 2024 concert tour, the Timeless Tour.

== Background ==
After rising to mainstream popularity, Meghan Trainor cited T-Pain as one of her biggest influences in a 2014 interview: "Everything is upbeat and happy; there's no ballads and it's catchy". After Trainor's popularity waned in the lead-up to the release of her third major-label studio album, Treat Myself (2020), she decided to return to the doo-wop sound of her song "Title" (2014) with her fifth major-label studio album, Takin' It Back (2022). The album included the single "Made You Look", which went viral on TikTok. It became Trainor's first song since 2016 to enter the top 40 on the US Billboard Hot 100 and reached the top 10 in several other countries.

Trainor had been a fan of T-Pain for years, which he reciprocated. T-Pain began seeking out the help of her husband, Daryl Sabara, and her manager, to bring about a meeting in 2023: "I worked with Meghan's husband and manager for months trying to surprise her for her birthday." Subsequently, Trainor wrote the song "Been Like This" with Faheem Najm, Kurt Thum, her brother Ryan, and its producers, Gian Stone and Grant Boutin. T-Pain described the song as "the collab you never knew you wanted but needed" and further reflected on its creation: "I think we came together in a way that's a perfect mesh of styles that will get everybody ready for us to work together again real soon." He later also appeared as a featured artist on Trainor's song "Love on Hold".

== Composition ==
"Been Like This" is two minutes and 25 seconds long. Stone and Boutin produced the song and provided background vocals, and they programmed it with Thum. Trainor's brother Justin handled engineering. Tom Norris mixed the song, and Randy Merrill mastered it.

"Been Like This" begins with a jazz-influenced intro, which is contrasted by a "trumpet counter melody" through the rest of the song. Trainor combines retro musical styles with hip-hop beats and synthesizers. According to Uproxx's Derrick Rossignol, the song "brings vintage doo-wop sounds to present day in a poppy and fun way", and The Times's Ed Potton stated it "blends doo-wop with the Charleston". Mike DeWald of Riff likened the "memorable toe-tapping rhythm" of "Been Like This" to the work of Andy Grammer and believed T-Pain assumed a classic style that strayed from his usual music.

In the lyrics of "Been Like This", Trainor compliments herself and asserts her confidence: "She's cute and she's classy, thick, bold and sassy / She knows what she do when she moves". She references her 2014 single "All About That Bass" with the lyrics "Ooh-wee, she got that booty / That type of boom-boom, that bass that I like". T-Pain raps the second verse included in the song, describing himself as "filthy rich" and mentioning the Grammy Awards he has won.

== Release and promotion ==
Trainor and T-Pain released "Been Like This" as the lead single from the former's upcoming sixth major-label studio album, Timeless (2024), on March 14, 2024. Sony Music serviced the song for radio airplay in Italy on March 22. Following its release, Trainor bought a page-length advertisement in The Atlanta Journal-Constitution, thanking T-Pain for being her "favorite artist of all time" and his musicality and lyricism. He uploaded a TikTok video expressing his elation and appreciation: "This is the craziest shit that anybody's ever done, period. Look, it's the actual fucking newspaper, bro!" Trainor performed "Been Like This" alongside "To the Moon" during the 22nd season of American Idol on May 5, 2024, and on Today on June 7, 2024. She reprised "Been Like This" on Capital's Summertime Ball and included it on the set list of her 2024 concert tour, the Timeless Tour. Trainor also sang it at the 2024 KIIS-FM Jingle Ball.

Phillip R Lopez and Lauren Dunn directed the music video for "Been Like This", which was choreographed by Charm La'Donna. While teasing it in a promotional appearance on Live with Kelly and Mark, Trainor stated: "He is the greatest dancer. I think we all forgot because we were like, 'Oh, he's so talented at singing and writing lyrics', but this dude was giving robot. He was like dripping sweat, giving 110%." The video was released on March 27, 2024. It features Trainor alongside background dancers, performing a dance routine afront a space-themed background. Trainor and T-Pain swing on a chandelier and use blue staircases.

== Reception ==
"Been Like This" peaked at numbers 15 and 24 on the Adult Pop Airplay and Pop Airplay charts in the US, respectively. The song debuted at number 60 on the UK Singles Chart issued for March 28, 2024. It became Trainor's ninth and T-Pain's eleventh single to enter the top 40 on the chart, reaching number 40 in its third week. "Been Like This" charted at number 29 on the Australia Digital Tracks chart issued for March 25, 2024. The song debuted at number three on the New Zealand Hot Singles chart that same week.

"Been Like This" peaked at number 16 on the Japan Hot Overseas chart dated April 10, 2024. The song debuted at number 79 on the Irish Singles Chart issued for March 29, 2024. It reached number 51 during the following chart week, dated April 5, 2024. "Been Like This" debuted at number 58 on Nigeria's TurnTable Top 100 Songs chart issued for March 28, 2024, and peaked at number 46. The song charted at number 175 on the South Korea Download chart's 12th week of 2024.

Critically, Renowned for Sound's Graeme R believed that Trainor stuck to the formula that brought her success and T-Pain's contributions were what stood out and shaped "Been Like This". It was included on year-end lists of the worst songs of 2024. Variety placed the song in the top 15, and Steven J. Horowitz thought that though it was not terrible, it lacked "the depth and soul of the [1920s] speakeasy music" it emulated; he described it as highly Auto-Tuned and factory-made but opined that Trainor's sincerity carried the song. Anthony Fantano ranked "Been Like This" at number eight for The Needle Drop and shared a similar opinion: that it recycled the same formula Trainor had used for a decade, with heavily Auto-Tuned vocals that sounded "soulless and so sterile"; he also argued that while the song borrowed from 1920s jazz, its "robotic" production stripped away any real personality or authenticity.

== Credits and personnel ==
Credits are adapted from the liner notes of Timeless.

- Gian Stone – producer, songwriter, programming, background vocals
- Grant Boutin – producer, songwriter, programming, background vocals
- Meghan Trainor – songwriter
- Faheem Najm – songwriter
- Kurt Thum – songwriter, programming
- Ryan Trainor – songwriter
- Justin Trainor – engineer
- Randy Merrill – mastering
- Tom Norris – mixing

== Charts ==
Chart performance for "Been Like This"
Chart (2024)	Peak position
Australia Digital Tracks (ARIA)	29
Ireland (IRMA)	51
Japan Hot Overseas (Billboard Japan)	16
Latvia Airplay (LAIPA)	17
New Zealand Hot Singles (RMNZ)	3
Nigeria (TurnTable Top 100)	46
South Korea Download (Circle)	175
UK Singles (Official Charts)	40
US Adult Pop Airplay (Billboard)	15
US Pop Airplay (Billboard)	24

== Release history ==
Release dates and format(s) for "Been Like This"
Region	Date	Format(s)	Version	Label	Ref.
Various	March 14, 2024	Digital download; streaming	Original	Epic	
Italy	March 22, 2024	Radio airplay	Original	Sony	
Various	June 3, 2024	Digital download; streaming	Remixes	Epic	
