= Gian Stone =

American producer, songwriter, and vocal producer

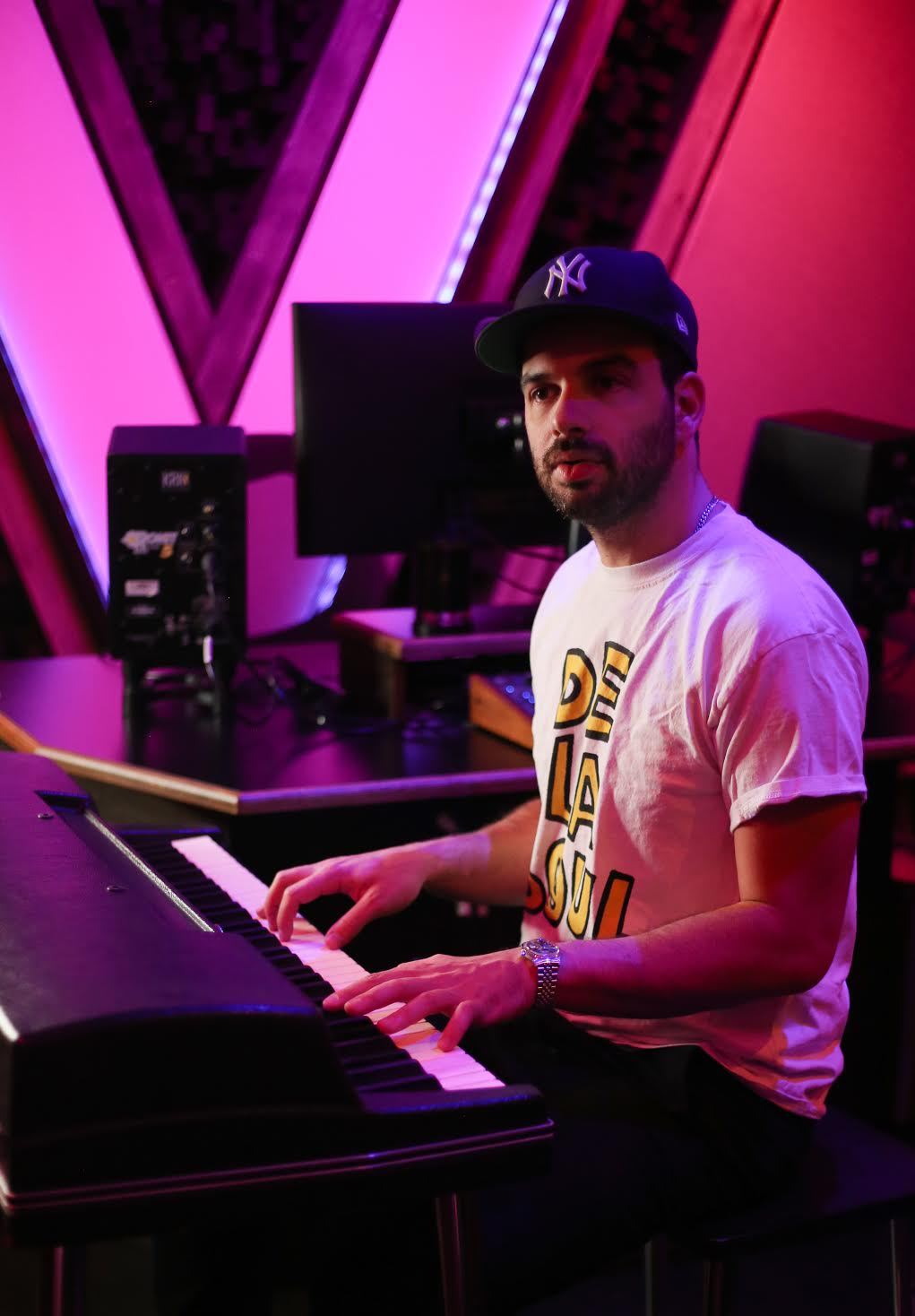
- Stone at the piano

Background information
- Origin: New York, New York, United States
- Genres: Pop; alternative; indie; country
- Occupations: Record producer; songwriter; mixing engineer; vocal producer

Gian Stone is an American songwriter and record producer from New York City. He topped the Billboard Hot 100 Producer Chart in May 2020, following his production work on Justin Bieber and Ariana Grande's number one-single "Stuck with U".

His other credits include Maroon 5's "Girls Like You", Marshmello and Halsey's "Be Kind", and the Jonas Brothers "Like It's Christmas", as well as songs for John Legend, Zayn, Rosé, Teddy Swims, J-Hope, NBA YoungBoy, Le Sserafim, Meghan Trainor, The Roots, Diplo, Ava Max, and T-Pain, among others. He has vocal produced for artists including Katy Perry, Madonna, Dua Lipa, Miley Cyrus, Jonas Brothers, Selena Gomez, Ellie Goulding, SZA, Bebe Rexha, Maroon 5, Keith Urban, Teddy Swims, Lewis Capaldi, and Rufus Du Sol.

He was nominated for a Best Engineered Album, Non-Classical Grammy Award in 2018 for his work on Head Over Heels by Chromeo, and a Grammy Award for Album of the Year in 2021 for his work on Justin Bieber's Justice.

== Discography ==
=== Production / Songwriting ===
Year	Song	Artist	Album	Details
2026	"Scared Of Heights"	Wyatt Flores	"Scared Of Heights"	Songwriter, producer
2026	"Christmas In New York"	Ejae	Non-album single	Songwriter
2026	"Would U Still Love Me" Feat. Cameron Whitcomb	Diplo	"Whitcomb vs. Flores"	Songwriter
2026	"Saving This Bottle" Feat. Wyatt Flores	Diplo	"Whitcomb vs. Flores"	Songwriter
2026	"Highway Robber"	Paige Fish	"Midnight Crisis"	Songwriter, producer
2026	"Precious"	The Joy	Non-album single	Songwriter, producer
2026	"Spokane"	Gabriella Rose	"I Just Want To Be Loved"	Songwriter
2026	"Teenage Nights"	Austin George	Non-album single	Songwriter, producer
2026	"Know I'll Have To Quit"	Grace Tyler	"Know I'll Have To Quit"	Songwriter
2026	"Hate Myself"	Wyatt Flores	"Scared Of Heights"	Songwriter, producer
2026	“Sober For A Month”	Wyatt Flores	"Scared Of Heights"	Songwriter, producer
2026	“Not Good Enough”	Wyatt Flores	"Scared Of Heights"	Songwriter, producer
2026	“How To Let Me Go”	Wyatt Flores	"Scared Of Heights"	Songwriter, producer
2026	“South Dakota”	Wyatt Flores	"Scared Of Heights"	Songwriter, producer
2026	“Sleepless Lullaby”	Wyatt Flores	"Scared Of Heights"	Songwriter, producer
2026	“God Forgives”	Wyatt Flores	"Scared Of Heights"	Songwriter, producer
2026	“The Way I Do”	Wyatt Flores	"Scared Of Heights"	Songwriter, producer
2026	“Tulsa And Eleanor”	Wyatt Flores	"Scared Of Heights"	Songwriter, producer
2026	"How Little I Need"	Paige Fish	Single	Songwriter, producer
2026	"Me Or My Guitar"	Mason Ramsey	"Outlaw In Love"	Songwriter
2026	"He Broke My Heart And Got Away With It"	Isaac Dunbar	Non-album single	Songwriter, producer
2026	"Half The Man"	Wyatt Flores	"Scared Of Heights"	Songwriter, producer
2026	"Hands On Me"	RHYE	"Joy II"	Songwriter, producer
2026	"Kiss Me 'Til The Pain Subsides"	Austin George	Non-album single	Songwriter, producer
2026	"Before You Hit The Water"	Sebastian Schub	Non-album single	Songwriter, producer
2026	"Drive All Night"	Wyatt Flores	Single	Songwriter, producer
2026	"Time Doesn't Heal"	Elmiene	"Sounds For Someone"	Songwriter, producer
2026	"Time I'd Waste"	Austin George	Non-album single	Songwriter, producer
2026	"Whisky Or Me"	Jas Von	Non-album single	Producer
2026	"This Christmas"	JYT	Non-album single	Producer
2026	"Runnin On E"	Wyatt Flores	Single	Songwriter, producer
2026	"Outside A Dream"	Kai Devega	Non-album single	Songwriter, producer
2026	"Like Like"	Austin George	Non-album single	Songwriter, producer
2026	"Hard Times"	Sunny Black	"Hard Times"	Songwriter, producer
2026	"Secret"	Lauren Spencer Smith	"The Art Of Being A Mess (Deluxe)"	Producer
2026	"Didn't Forget" Feat. Wyatt Flores	Waylon Wyatt	Non-album single	Songwriter, producer
2026	"Shameless"	Austin George	Non-album single	Songwriter, producer
2026	"Dying With My Baby"	Austin George	Non-album single	Songwriter, producer
2025	"Spaghetti" Feat. J-Hope of BTS	Le Sserafim	Non-album single	Songwriter, producer
2025	"Hello"	Gabriel Jacoby	"Gutta Child"	Songwriter, producer
2025	"Diamond"	Tom Grennan	"Everywhere I Went, Led Me To Where I Didn't Want To Be"	Songwriter, producer
2025	"Last First Christmas"	Lauren Spencer Smith	Non-album single	Songwriter, producer
2025	"Gettin' Older"	Jas Von & YoungBoy Never Broke Again	Non-album single	Producer
2025	"Santa Be Good"	Pentatonix	"Christmas In The City"	Songwriter, producer
2025	"Christmas Movie"	Pentatonix	"Christmas In The City"	Songwriter, producer
2025	"Be Careful"	Gabriel Jacoby	Non-album single	Songwriter, producer
2025	"Like It Like That"	Dasha	Non-album single	Songwriter, producer
2025	"FYILY"	Austin George	Non-album single	Songwriter, producer
2025	"It's Beginning To Look A Lot Like Christmas"	Dom Innarella	Non-album single	Producer
2025	"Who Raised You?"	Austin George	Non-album single	Producer
2025	"If Karma Doesn't Get You (I Will)"	Lauren Spencer Smith	"The Art of Being a Mess"	Producer
2025	"Way It Was"	Two Friends & Quinn XCII	Non-album single	Songwriter
2025	"Beverly Hills"	Jas Von	Non-album single	Producer
2025	"All For You"	Austin George	Non-album single	Songwriter, producer
2025	"Nashville"	Rosie	"City Woman"	Songwriter, producer
2025	"Didn't Feel A Thing"	Rosie	"City Woman"	Songwriter, producer
2025	"Be Careful - A Colors Show"	Gabriel Jacoby	Non-album single	Songwriter, producer
2025	"Catch Me If You Can"	KSI	Non-album single	Songwriter, producer
2025	"City Woman"	Rosie	Non-album single	Songwriter, producer
2025	"Things You Never Say"	Lauren Spencer Smith	"The Art Of Being A Mess"	Songwriter, producer
2025	"Candy Eyes"	Austin George	"Whiterock"	Songwriter, producer
2025	"Hallelujah"	Kevin Olusola	Non-album single	Producer
2025	"Bad Thoughts (Acoustic)"	Rachel Platten	"Bad Thoughts"	Producer
2025	"Taillights"	Austin George	Non-album single	Songwriter, producer
2024	"Stardust"	Zayn	Room Under The Stairs	Songwriter, producer
2024	"Too Bad For Us"	Rosé	"Rosie"	Songwriter
2024	"Hey Rudy Feat. The Roots"	Jimmy Fallon	Holiday Seasoning	Songwriter, producer
2024	"I Want You This Christmas"	Saweetie	Dear Big Santa	Songwriter, producer
2024	"Big Santa"	Saweetie	Dear Big Santa	Songwriter, producer
2024	"Jingle Bell Rock"	Rachel Platten	Non-album single	Songwriter, producer
2024	"Remember Feat. Lang Lang"	Jimmy Fallon	Holiday Seasoning	Producer
2024	"Christmas Alone"	Jimmy Fallon	Holiday Seasoning	Songwriter, producer
2024	"Make A Move"	Meghan Trainor	Timeless (Deluxe)	Songwriter
2024	"One On One"	AJ Mitchell	Non-album single	Songwriter
2024	"Favorite"	Austin George	Non-album single	Songwriter, producer
2024	"Sober Up"	Quinn XCII	Lunch EP	Producer
2024	"Magic"	Yaz	Wish You Were Here	Producer
2024	"I'll Be Her"	Rachel Platten	I Am Rachel Platten	Songwriter, producer
2024	“First Day”	Rachel Platten	I Am Rachel Platten	Songwriter, producer
2024	“Slow December”	Rachel Platten	I Am Rachel Platten	Songwriter, producer
2024	“The River”	Rachel Platten	I Am Rachel Platten	Songwriter, producer
2024	“Surrendering”	Rachel Platten	I Am Rachel Platten	Songwriter, producer
2024	“Set Me Free”	Rachel Platten	I Am Rachel Platten	Songwriter, producer
2024	“Gimme Something”	Rachel Platten	I Am Rachel Platten	Songwriter, producer
2024	“Need You”	Rachel Platten	I Am Rachel Platten	Songwriter, producer
2024	“Caroline (feat. Michael Bolton)”	Rachel Platten	I Am Rachel Platten	Songwriter, producer
2024	"Andrea"	Austin George	Non-album single	Songwriter, producer
2024	"Unconditional"	Quinn XCII	Non-album single	Songwriter, producer
2024	"Tragic!"	Casey & The Smiths	Non-album single	Songwriter, producer
2024	"I Know"	Rachel Platten	Non-album single	Songwriter, producer
2024	"Melt"	Quinn XCII	Non-album single	Songwriter, producer
2024	"Hate It Here"	Meghan Trainor	Timeless	Songwriter, producer
2024	“Whoops”	Meghan Trainor	Timeless	Songwriter, producer
2024	“I Don't Do Maybe”	Meghan Trainor	Timeless	Songwriter, producer
2024	“Timeless”	Meghan Trainor	Timeless	Songwriter, producer
2024	“Bestie”	Meghan Trainor	Timeless	Songwriter, producer
2024	"Rock Bottom"	Rosie	Non-album single	Songwriter, producer
2024	"Skin"	August Ponthier	Non-album single	Songwriter, producer
2024	"New Faith"	Austin George	Non-album single	Songwriter, producer
2024	"Bad Thoughts"	Rachel Platten	Non-album single	Producer
2024	"Been Like This"	Meghan Trainor & T-Pain	Timeless	Songwriter, producer
2024	"Truth Is A Gun"	Austin George	Non-album single	Songwriter, producer
2024	"Didn't Anybody Tell You"	The Flirtations	Still Sounds Like The Flirtations	Songwriter
2024	“Ain't No Easy Way”	The Flirtations	Still Sounds Like The Flirtations	Songwriter
2024	“You Don't Live Here Anymore”	The Flirtations	Still Sounds Like The Flirtations	Songwriter
2024	“No One Does It Like You”	The Flirtations	Still Sounds Like The Flirtations	Songwriter
2024	"Room 32"	Austin George	Non-album single	Songwriter, producer
2024	"More Than My Mind"	Elio	Non-album single	Songwriter, producer
2024	"Stay (feat. Able Faces)"	Elliot Kings	Non-album single	Songwriter
2024	"Yesterday"	Austin George	Non-album single	Songwriter, producer
2024	"Mercy"	Rachel Platten	Non-album single	Producer
2023	"Slow Down"	Dream	to whoever wants to hear	Songwriter, producer
2023	"Wrap Me Up"	Meghan Trainor & Jimmy Fallon	Non-album single	Songwriter, producer
2023	"Girls (String Version)"	Rachel Platten	Non-album single	Producer
2023	"Please Santa Please"	Pentatonix	Non-album single	Producer
2023	"The Trailer"	salem ilese	High Concept	Songwriter
2023	"Same Streets"	Austin George	Non-album single	Songwriter, producer
2023	"Face Like A Sunset"	Eighty Ninety	Non-album single	Songwriter
2023	"Grey Lines"	Austin George	Non-album single	Songwriter, producer
2023	"Girls"	Rachel Platten	Non-album single	Producer
2023	"Mother"	Meghan Trainor	Non-album single	Songwriter, producer
2023	"Grow Up"	Meghan Trainor	Non-album single	Songwriter, producer
2023	"Stay Alive"	Eighty Ninety	Non-album single	Songwriter, producer
2023	"I Don't Love You Like I Used To"	John Legend	Legend (Solo Piano Version)	Songwriter
2023	"First Christmas"	Anthony Nunziata	Non-album single	Producer
2023	"Be Alright (15 Edition)"	Jimmie Allen	Non-album single	Songwriter
2022	"Look At You"	Rebecca Black	Non-album single	Songwriter, producer
2022	"Kid On Christmas"	Meghan Trainor & Pentatonix	Non-album single	Producer
2022	"Off Season"	Austin George	Non-album single	Songwriter, producer
2022	"Shook"	Meghan Trainor	Takin' It Back	Songwriter, producer, mixing engineer
2022	"Lucky"	Meghan Trainor	Takin' It Back	Songwriter, producer, mixing engineer
2022	"Breezy"	Meghan Trainor	Takin' It Back	Songwriter, producer, mixing engineer
2022	"Rainbow"	Meghan Trainor	Takin' It Back	Songwriter, producer, mixing engineer
2022	"Someone Who Loved You"	Teddy Swims	Non-album single	Songwriter, producer
2022	"I Don't Love You Like I Used To"	John Legend	Legend	Songwriter, producer
2022	"Cool"	John Legend	Legend	Songwriter, producer
2022	"Manners"	Austin George	Non-album single	Songwriter, producer
2022	"Be Alright"	Jimmie Allen	Tulip Drive	Songwriter, producer
2022	"Shoulda Known Better"	Dixie D'Amelio	a letter to me	Songwriter, producer
2022	"Goodbye"	Mimi Webb	Non-album single	Songwriter, producer
2022	"One and Only"	Garrett Kato	Non-album single	Songwriter
2022	"Basic Needs"	Sabrina Claudio	Based On A Feeling	Songwriter
2022	"Smile"	Cappi	Starlight - EP	Songwriter, producer
2022	"Starlight"	Cappi	Starlight - EP	Songwriter, producer
2022	"True Love"	Cappi	Starlight - EP	Songwriter, producer
2022	"Promises"	Cappi	Starlight - EP	Songwriter, producer
2022	"Everything"	Cappi	Starlight - EP	Songwriter, producer
2022	"Keys To The Kingdom"	Sweet Taboo	Non-album single	Songwriter, producer
2022	"Love Me For Me"	MASN	Non-album single	Songwriter, producer
2022	"Bonnie & Clyde"	Thomas Day	Non-album single	Songwriter, producer
2021	"Lying to Myself"	david hugo	How to Love Other People	Songwriter
2021	"Chasing Stars (Stripped)"	James Bay, Alesso, & Marshmello	Non-album single	Producer
2021	"Leave My Mind"	Ben Platt	Reverie	Songwriter, producer
2021	"Chasing You"	Ben Platt	Reverie	Songwriter, producer
2021	"Childhood Bedroom"	Ben Platt	Reverie	Songwriter, producer
2021	"Dance With You"	Ben Platt	Reverie	Songwriter, producer
2021	"Happy to Be Sad"	Ben Platt	Reverie	Songwriter, producer
2021	"Here's Your Perfect (with Salem Ilese)"	Jamie Miller	Non-album single	Songwriter, producer
2021	"Yoü And I"	Ben Platt	Born This Way The Tenth Anniversary	Producer
2021	"nothing with you"	John K	in case you miss me	Songwriter, producer
2021	"2 Much"	Justin Bieber	Justice	Songwriter
2021	"Here's Your Perfect"	Jamie Miller	Non-album single	Songwriter, producer
2021	"Imagine (Stripped)"	Ben Platt	Non-album single	Producer
2021	"27 Club"	Dennis Lloyd	Some Days	Songwriter, producer
2021	"The Breakdown"	Cappi	Non-album single	Songwriter, producer
2021	"Everything Changes"	Ben Rice	Future Pretend	Producer
2021	"American"	Ben Rice	Future Pretend	Producer
2021	"Forever"	Eighty Ninety	Non-album single	Songwriter, producer
2020	"talk me out of it"	Olivia Holt	Non-album single	Songwriter, producer
2020	"Guess I'm a Liar"	Sofia Carson	Non-album single	Songwriter, producer
2020	"Christmas Without You"	Ava Max	Non-album single	Songwriter, producer
2020	"Better As Friends"	Eighty Ninety	Non-album single	Songwriter, producer
2020	"Stuck With U"	Justin Bieber & Ariana Grande	Non-album single	Songwriter, producer
2020	"Happier"	Eighty Ninety	Non-album single	Songwriter, producer
2020	"Be Kind"	Marshmello & Halsey	Non-album single	Songwriter, producer
2020	"Forever"	Fletcher	Non-album single	Songwriter, producer
2020	Hot Coffee (EP)	Cappi	Hot Coffee	Songwriter, producer
2020	"Enemy"	Wafia	Non-album single	Songwriter, producer
2020	"Y'all Come Back Now"	Jordan James	Non-album single	Songwriter, producer
2019	"Like It's Christmas"	Jonas Brothers	Non-album single	Songwriter, producer
2019	"Jealous"	Ingrid Michaelson	Stranger Songs	Songwriter, producer
2019	"Nudies"	24hrs (rapper)	World On Fire	Producer
2019	"Bad Memories (feat. Lil Tracy)"	Lil Gnar	FIRE HAZARD	Producer
2018	"Future"	The Revivalists	Take Good Care	Songwriter
2018	"Girls Like You (feat. Cardi B)"	Maroon 5	Red Pill Blues	Songwriter
2018	"Free Bird"	Yaniza	Non-album single	Producer
2017	"Girls Like You"	Maroon 5	Red Pill Blues	Songwriter
2017	"Good Days"	Shawn Hook	My Side of Your Story	Additional production
2017	Entire album	Bell the Band	Bell the Band	Producer

=== Vocal Production / Mixing / Engineering ===
Year	Song	Artist	Album	Credit
2026	"Heroine"	Maroon 5	Non-album single	Vocal Producer, Engineer
2026	"Scared Of Heights (ALBUM)"	Wyatt Flores	Scared Of Heights	Mixing engineer, Engineer, Vocal Producer
2025	"Secrets" (feat. Lindsey Buckingham and Mick Fleetwood)	Miley Cyrus	Something Beautiful (Deluxe)	Mixing engineer, Vocal Producer
2025	"Gettin' Older"	Jas Von & YoungBoy Never Broke Again	Non-album single	Mixing engineer, Engineer
2024	"Love On"	Selena Gomez	Non-album single	Vocal Producer
2024	"Stardust"	Zayn	Room Under The Stairs	Vocal Producer, Engineer
2024	"Rock Bottom"	Rosie	Non-album single	Vocal Producer, Engineer
2024	"Get By"	Jellyroll	Non-album single	Vocal Producer
2024	"Evergreen" (feat. Ilsey)	Deyaz	Non-album single	Vocal Producer, Engineer
2024	"Whatever"	Kygo x Ava Max	Non-album single	Vocal Producer, Engineer
2024	"Strangers"	Lewis Capaldi	Broken By Desire To Be Heavenly Sent (Extended Edition)	Vocal Producer
2023	"Slow Down"	Dream	to whoever wants to hear	Vocal Producer, Engineer
2023	"Strong Enough"	Jonas Brothers & Bailey Zimmerman	Non-album single	Vocal Producer
2023	"Not Done Yet"	Quavo	Rocket Power	Vocal Producer
2023	"Minute"	Kim Petras	Feed The Beast	Vocal Producer
2023	"Love Like This"	Zayn	Non-album single	Vocal Producer
2022	"My Mind and Me"	Selena Gomez	Non-album single	Vocal Producer
2022	"Shook"	Meghan Trainor	Takin' It Back	Mixing Engineer, Engineer, Vocal Producer
2022	"Lucky"	Meghan Trainor	Takin' It Back	Mixing Engineer, Engineer, Vocal Producer
2022	"Breezy"	Meghan Trainor	Takin' It Back	Mixing Engineer, Engineer, Vocal Producer
2022	"Rainbow"	Meghan Trainor	Takin' It Back	Mixing Engineer, Engineer, Vocal Producer
2022	"Someone Who Loved You"	Teddy Swims	Non-album single	Vocal Producer, Engineer
2022	"Be Alright"	Jimmie Allen	Tulip Drive	Vocal Producer, Engineer
2022	"I Still Love You"	Eloise Alterman	Non-album single	Vocal Producer, Engineer
2021	"Leave My Mind"	Ben Platt	Reverie	Vocal Producer, Engineer
2021	"King Of The World (pts. 1 2 and 3)"	Ben Platt	Reverie	Vocal Producer, Engineer
2021	"Childhood Bedroom"	Ben Platt	Reverie	Vocal Producer, Engineer
2021	"Dance With You"	Ben Platt	Reverie	Vocal Producer, Engineer
2021	"Happy To Be Sad"	Ben Platt	Reverie	Vocal Producer, Engineer
2021	"I Wanna Love You"	Ben Platt	Reverie	Vocal Producer, Engineer
2021	"Carefully"	Ben Platt	Reverie	Vocal Producer, Engineer
2021	"Cashing You"	Ben Platt	Reverie	Vocal Producer, Engineer
2021	"Come Back"	Ben Platt	Reverie	Vocal Producer, Engineer
2021	"Dark Times"	Ben Platt	Reverie	Vocal Producer, Engineer
2021	"Imagine"	Ben Platt	Reverie	Vocal Producer, Engineer
2021	"Lost"	Maroon 5	Jordi	Vocal Producer
2021	"Nobody's Love"	Maroon 5	Jordi	Vocal Producer
2021	"Memories"	Maroon 5	Jordi	Vocal Producer
2021	"Memories (Remix)"	Maroon 5	Jordi	Vocal Producer
2021	"Remedy"	Maroon 5	Jordi	Vocal Producer
2021	"Remember This"	Jonas Brothers	Non-album single	Vocal Producer, Engineer
2021	"Imagine"	Ben Platt	Non-album single	Vocal Producer, Engineer
2021	"Selfish"	Nick Jonas	Spaceman	Vocal Producer, Engineer
2021	"Undertone"	Julia Michaels	Not in Chronological Order	Vocal Producer
2021	"Love Is Weird"	Julia Michaels	Not in Chronological Order	Vocal Producer
2021	"Pessimist"	Julia Michaels	Not in Chronological Order	Vocal Producer
2021	"Unfamiliar"	Julia Michaels	Not in Chronological Order	Vocal Producer
2020	"talk me out of it"	Olivia Holt	Non-album single	Vocal Producer, Engineer
2020	"Funny"	Zedd & Jasmine Thompson	Non-album single	Vocal Producer, Engineer
2020	"Daisies"	Katy Perry	Smile	Vocal Producer
2020	"Daisies (Acoustic)"	Katy Perry	Smile	Vocal Producer
2020	"5 More Minutes"	The Jonas Brothers	Non-album single	Vocal Producer, Engineer
2020	"Physical"	Dua Lipa	Future Nostalgia	Vocal Producer, Engineer
2020	"For Your Love"	Gunnar Gehl	Non-album single	Vocal Producer, Engineer
2020	"Forever"	Fletcher	Non-album single	Vocal Producer, Engineer
2020	"Don't Mind"	Louis the Child	Here For Now	Engineer
2020	"Quarantine"	Boy Epic	Non-album single	Vocal Producer, Engineer
2020	"Love You More (feat. will.i.am & Lay Zhang)"	Steve Aoki	Neon Future IV	Vocal Producer
2020	"I Still Do"	Kiiara	Non-album single	Vocal Producer
2020	"play w/ me"	Bailey Bryan	Non-album single	Vocal Producer, Engineer
2020	"NEVERMIND"	HRVY	Can Anybody Hear Me?	Vocal Producer, Engineer
2020	"Y’all Come Back Now"	Jordan James	Non-album single	Vocal Producer, Engineer
2019	"Trust"	Jonas Brothers	Happiness Begins	Vocal Producer
2019	Tell Your Uncle	Pen Pals x Junclassic	Tell Your Uncle	Mixing Engineer, Engineer (entire album)
2019	"I Wish"	Hayley Kiyoko	I'm Too Sensitive For This Shit	Vocal Producer, Engineer
2019	"Hate Me (with Juice WRLD)"	Ellie Goulding	Non-album single	Vocal Producer, Engineer
2019	"Good Things Fall Apart"	Illenium	Ascend	Vocal Producer, Engineer
2019	"Your Arms"	Illenium	Ascend	Vocal Producer, Engineer
2019	"Crazy"	Madonna	Madame X	Vocal Producer
2019	"I Rise"	Madonna	Madame X	Vocal Producer
2019	"Remember"	Liam Payne	LP1	Vocal Producer, Engineer
2019	"Slow Dance (feat. Ava Max)"	AJ Mitchell	Non-album single	Vocal Producer, Engineer
2019	"Can You Hear Me Now"	Bishop Briggs	Champion	Vocal Producer
2019	"Top Of The World"	Papa Roach	Who Do You Trust?	Vocal Producer, Engineer
2019	"Typical Story"	Hobo Johnson	The Fall of Hobo Johnson	Vocal Producer
2019	"Mover Awayer"	Hobo Johnson	The Fall of Hobo Johnson	Vocal Producer
2019	"Drama"	Boy Epic	Non-album single	Vocal Producer, Engineer
2019	"Be Somebody"	Brigetta	Songland	Vocal Producer, Engineer
2019	"Jersey"	Jonas Brothers	Music from Chasing Happiness	Vocal Producer, Engineer
2019	"Hurt For Long"	In Real Life	She Do	Vocal Producer, Engineer
2019	"On Somebody"	Ava Max	Non-album single	Vocal Producer
2018	"Ferrari"	Bebe Rexha	Expectations	Vocal Producer, Engineer
2018	"Hurts Like Hell (feat. Offset (rapper))"	Madison Beer	Non-album single	Vocal Producer, Engineer
2018	"Paris"	Sabrina Carpenter	Singular: Act I	Vocal Producer, Engineer
2018	"Girls Like You (feat. Cardi B)"	Maroon 5	Red Pill Blues	Vocal Producer, Engineer
2018	"Steal My Thunder"	Keith Urban	Graffiti U	Vocal Producer, Engineer
2018	"Same Heart"	Keith Urban	Graffiti U	Vocal Producer, Engineer
2018	"Must've Been (feat. DRAM)"	Chromeo	Head over Heels	Vocal Producer, Engineer
2018	"Juice"	Chromeo	Head over Heels	Vocal Producer, Engineer
2018	"One Track Mind"	Chromeo	Head over Heels	Vocal Producer, Engineer
2018	"Blame It On Love (feat. Madison Beer)"	David Guetta	7	Vocal Producer, Engineer
2017	"Say It To My Face"	Madison Beer	As She Pleases	Vocal Producer, Engineer
2017	"What Lovers Do (feat. SZA)"	Maroon 5	Red Pill Blues	Vocal Producer, Engineer
2017	"Girls Like You"	Maroon 5	Red Pill Blues	Vocal Producer, Engineer
2017	"Shiver"	Rachel Platten	Waves	Vocal Producer, Engineer
2017	"Loose Ends"	Rachel Platten	Waves	Vocal Producer, Engineer
2017	"Whole Heart"	Rachel Platten	Waves	Vocal Producer, Engineer
2017	"Grace"	Rachel Platten	Waves	Vocal Producer, Engineer
2017	"Lonely Night"	Fifth Harmony	Fifth Harmony	Vocal Producer, Engineer
2017	Bell the Band (Album)	Bell The Band	Bell The Band	Mixing Engineer, engineer (entire album)
2017	"Kanye's In My Head"	Boy Epic	Non-album single	Vocal Producer, Engineer
2017	"Good Life (G-Eazy and Kehlani)"	Various artists	The Fate of the Furious: The Album	Vocal Producer, Engineer
2017	"911 (Kevin Gates)"	Various artists	The Fate of the Furious: The Album	Vocal Producer, Engineer
2017	"Watch Me"	Nick Jonas	Ferdinand	Vocal Producer, Engineer
2017	"Trust"	Boy Epic	Non-album single	Vocal Producer, Engineer
2017	"Ins And Outs"	Sofia Carson	Non-album single	Vocal Producer, Engineer
2017	"Born For Greatness"	Papa Roach	Crooked Teeth	Vocal Producer
