= Lil Boo Thang =

Single by Paul Russell

from the EP Again Sometime?
- Released: August 18, 2023
- Genre: Nu-disco; pop rap
- Length: 1:54
- Label: Arista
- Songwriters: Paul Russell; Maurice White; Al McKay
- Producer: Sean Cook

Paul Russell singles chronology
"Touristy Places" (2023)	"Lil Boo Thang" (2023)	"Say Cheese" (2024)

Music video
- "Lil Boo Thang" on YouTube

"Lil Boo Thang" is a song by American rapper Paul Russell, released as a single on August 18, 2023, through Arista Records and featured on his 2024 EP Again Sometime?. Russell originally previewed the track on TikTok, where it went viral, receiving more than 10 million views. The song samples the 1977 track "Best of My Love" by the Emotions, which was written by Maurice White and Al McKay of Earth, Wind & Fire.

== Music video ==
The music video for the song, directed by Jamar Harding released on September 19, 2023, on YouTube.

== Background ==
Russell first previewed the track on TikTok on June 28, 2023, after which he signed with Arista Records to release it as a single. Russell told Billboard that he wrote the song after being "stressed out on a Thursday afternoon, so [he] just turned on some of the music that makes [him] happy and imagined that [he] was celebrating something".

In an episode of Genius' Verified series, Paul Russell explains the lyrics, and says the term lil boo thang refers to a partner in a caring, spicy, romantic relationship.

== Commercial performance ==
"Lil Boo Thang" debuted on the US Billboard Hot 100 at number 99 in September 2023, marking Russell's first chart appearance. It peaked at number 14 on the chart in January 2024.

== Remix ==
A remix of "Lil Boo Thang" by producer Galantis was released on December 15, 2023.

== Usage in media ==
The song plays during a scene in Companion and A Minecraft Movie (both 2025) along with Malcolm in the Middle: Life's Still Unfair (2026).

== Charts ==
=== Weekly charts ===
Weekly chart performance
Chart (2023–2024)	Peak position
Australia (ARIA)	17
Belgium (Ultratop 50 Flanders)	32
Belgium (Ultratop 50 Wallonia)	20
Canada (Canadian Hot 100)	5
Global 200 (Billboard)	79
Hungary (Editors' Choice Top 40)	1
Ireland (IRMA)	28
Japan Hot Overseas (Billboard Japan)	11
Latvia Airplay (LAIPA)	7
Netherlands (Tipparade)	13
New Zealand (Recorded Music NZ)	11
Nigeria (TurnTable Top 100)	53
Poland (Polish Airplay Top 100)	20
San Marino (SMRRTV Top 50)	1
Slovakia Airplay (ČNS IFPI)	31
UK Singles (Official Charts)	20
US Billboard Hot 100	14
US Adult Contemporary (Billboard)	15
US Adult Pop Airplay (Billboard)	2
US Hot Rap Songs (Billboard)	5
US Pop Airplay (Billboard)	5
US Rhythmic (Billboard)	8

=== Year-end charts ===
Year-end chart performance
Chart (2023)	Position
US Digital Song Sales (Billboard)	47

Chart (2024)	Position
Belgium (Ultratop 50 Wallonia)	78
Canada (Canadian Hot 100)	38
US Billboard Hot 100	78
US Adult Contemporary (Billboard)	37
US Adult Top 40 (Billboard)	16
US Mainstream Top 40 (Billboard)	25
US Rhythmic (Billboard)	46

== Certifications ==
Certifications for "Lil Boo Thang"
Region	Certification	Certified units/sales
Australia (ARIA)	Platinum	70,000^{‡}
Canada (Music Canada)	2× Platinum	160,000^{‡}
New Zealand (RMNZ)	Platinum	30,000^{‡}
United Kingdom (BPI)	Platinum	600,000^{‡}
United States (RIAA)	2× Platinum	2,000,000^{‡}
^{‡} Sales+streaming figures based on certification alone.
