= Chris Olsen =

American TikToker (born 1997)

- Olsen in 2026
- Born: Chris Olsen; December 22, 1997 (age 28); Washington, D.C., U.S.
- Citizenship: United States
- Occupation: Internet personality

TikTok information
- Page: Chris Olsen
- Followers: 14 million
- Last updated: April 3, 2026

Chris Olsen (born December 22, 1997) is an American media personality, author and creator of Flight Fuel Coffee. He has fourteen million followers on his main TikTok account. He has six million followers on his “private” notchrisolsen TikTok account. He starred in the 2022 television series The Book of Queer on Discovery+. He has collaborated with Meghan Trainor on social media videos and appeared on The Timeless Tour with her in 2024. In 2026 he published his debut memoir I Think My Therapist Hates Me.

== Early life and education ==
Olsen grew up in Chevy Chase, Maryland. He attended St. Albans School in Washington, D.C.. Olsen, who came out as bisexual in eighth grade, has described feeling "isolated" and "alone" as an openly queer person at his all-boys school, but has also credited the experience for making him more resilient. Olsen later transferred to Walnut Hill School for the Arts in Natick, Massachusetts, as a high schooler, graduating in 2016. He spent several summers at Stagedoor Manor in Loch Sheldrake, New York.

He has a Bachelor of Fine Arts in musical theatre from Boston Conservatory at Berklee, and he completed the last portion of the degree virtually during the COVID-19 pandemic.

Olsen has Filipino heritage.

== Career ==
Olsen began posting on TikTok in 2020 and gained attention in August for comedy videos about quarantining with his then-boyfriend. Within two weeks, he got a manager and began selling merchandise. He posted a video in which he delivered Starbucks coffee from New York City to his father in Washington, D.C., which led to a series of posts about coffee deliveries featuring famous recipients such as Meghan Trainor, Kamala Harris, Drew Barrymore, and to Austin Butler at the Cannes Film Festival. He attracted attention for holding a sign that says "Daddy?" at a Harry Styles concert. He developed a friendship with Meghan Trainor on social media and the pair began creating comedic TikToks.

He signed with Creative Artists Agency in all areas in 2022. That year, he starred in the television series The Book of Queer on Discovery+. Olsen started the company Flight Fuel Coffee in early 2023. In November 2023, he had twelve million followers. He appeared as an act on The Timeless Tour with Meghan Trainor in 2024.

Olsen appeared on the 2024 Forbes 30 under 30 list in the social media category. In 2020, People magazine named him the "Sexiest Guy on TikTok" and in 2024 he was nominated for a Webby Award for Best Influencer. He was GLAAD's inaugural Queer Advocate of the Year.

In 2024, he coined the following of his secondary TikTok account "Club Chris". This secondary account is often private. Fans are able to interact with him intimately as well as get access to perks.

In October 2024, Olsen announced he was going on tour with Ryan Trainor in 2025. The tour will visit 12 major cities in the United States. “Club Chris” members have access to presale codes and merchandise. As of October 2024, the secondary TikTok account had six million members.

In September 2026, Olsen published his debut memoir I Think My Therapist Hates Me.

== Personal life ==
Olsen splits his time between Los Angeles and New York City. He struggled with alcoholism as a teenager and has been sober since he was 19. He was in a relationship with Ian Paget, who frequently appeared in his videos, until the pair split in 2022.
