= The Timeless Tour =

2024 concert tour by Meghan Trainor

- Tour by Meghan Trainor
- Location: North America
- Associated album: Timeless
- Start date: September 1, 2024
- End date: October 19, 2024
- No. of shows: 26
- Supporting acts: Paul Russell; Chris Olsen; Ryan Trainor; Natasha Bedingfield
- Attendance: 259,663
- Box office: $14.1 million

Meghan Trainor concert chronology
- The Untouchable Tour (2016); The Timeless Tour (2024)

The Timeless Tour was the fourth headlining concert tour by American singer-songwriter Meghan Trainor, launched in support of her sixth studio album Timeless (2024). The singer's first in eight years, the tour began on September 1, 2024, in Hollywood, and concluded in Inglewood on October 19, 2024, comprising twenty-six shows. Paul Russell, Chris Olsen, Ryan Trainor and Natasha Bedingfield served as opening acts.

Pollstar estimated the Timeless Tour was 98% sold out, with 259,663 tickets being sold. With $14.1 million in gross revenue, The Timeless Tour was Trainor's best-selling tour.

== Background ==
On March 14, 2024, Trainor announced a 24-date tour in North America, with the presale and general sale taking place on March 19 and 22, respectively.

The tour was largely performed in outdoor amphitheaters, but stopped at a few arenas, including Madison Square Garden, Kia Forum, and Allstate Arena. Additionally, concerts were performed with recorded tracks rather than a live band in order to afford live dancers.

== Set list ==
The following set list is from the Pittsburgh concert on September 6. It does not represent all dates.

1. "Mother"
2. "Don't I Make It Look Easy"
3. "Lips Are Movin"
4. "No Excuses"
5. "Crushin'"
6. "Bestie"
7. "Title"
8. "Forget How to Love"
9. "Superwoman"
10. "Like I'm Gonna Lose You"
11. "Dear Future Husband"
12. "Crowded Room"
13. "Doin' It All for You"
14. "All About That Bass"
15. "Wave"
16. "Genetics"
17. "No"
18. "Hate It Here"
19. "Me Too"
20. "Whoops"
21. "To the Moon"
22. "Been Like This"
23. "Timeless"
24. "I Wanna Thank Me"
  Encore
25. "Made You Look"

=== Alterations ===
- "Better When I'm Dancin'" and "Criminals" were added to the set list on September 20.

== Tour dates ==
List of concerts
Date (2024)	City	Country	Venue	Opening acts	Attendance	Revenue
September 1	Hollywood	United States	Hard Rock Live	Paul Russell	—	—
September 2	Tampa	United States	Seminole Hard Rock Hotel & Casino	Paul Russell	—	—
September 4	Cincinnati	United States	Riverbend Music Center	Paul Russell; Chris Olsen	—	—
September 6	Pittsburgh	United States	Petersen Events Center	Chris Olsen	—	—
September 7	Philadelphia	United States	TD Pavilion	Paul Russell; Chris Olsen	—	—
September 10	Franklin	United States	FirstBank Amphitheater	Paul Russell; Ryan Trainor	—	—
September 12	Raleigh	United States	Red Hat Amphitheater	Paul Russell; Chris Olsen	—	—
September 13	Alpharetta	United States	Ameris Bank Amphitheatre	Paul Russell; Chris Olsen	—	—
September 15	Charlotte	United States	PNC Music Pavilion	Paul Russell; Chris Olsen	—	—
September 17	Bristow	United States	Jiffy Lube Live	Paul Russell; Chris Olsen	—	—
September 20	Mansfield	United States	Xfinity Center	Paul Russell; Chris Olsen	—	—
September 21	Uncasville	United States	Mohegan Sun Arena	Paul Russell; Chris Olsen	—	—
September 25	New York City	United States	Madison Square Garden	Natasha Bedingfield; Paul Russell; Chris Olsen	12,469 / 12,469	$1,150,000
September 27	Cuyahoga Falls	United States	Blossom Music Center	Paul Russell; Ryan Trainor	—	—
September 28	Toronto	Canada	Budweiser Stage	Paul Russell; Ryan Trainor	15,857	$680,189
September 30	Sterling Heights	United States	Michigan Lottery Amphitheatre	Paul Russell; Ryan Trainor	—	—
October 2	Maryland Heights	United States	Hollywood Casino Amphitheatre	Paul Russell; Ryan Trainor	—	—
October 4	Noblesville	United States	Ruoff Music Center	Paul Russell; Ryan Trainor	—	—
October 5	Rosemont	United States	Allstate Arena	Paul Russell; Chris Olsen	10,253	$788,010
October 8	Morrison	United States	Red Rocks Amphitheatre	Natasha Bedingfield; Paul Russell; Chris Olsen	—	—
October 10	Rogers	United States	Walmart Arkansas Music Pavilion	Paul Russell; Chris Olsen	—	—
October 12	Irving	United States	Toyota Music Factory	Paul Russell; Chris Olsen	—	—
October 13	The Woodlands	United States	Cynthia Woods Mitchell Pavilion	Paul Russell; Chris Olsen	—	—
October 16	Phoenix	United States	Talking Stick Resort Amphitheatre	Paul Russell; Chris Olsen	—	—
October 18	Mountain View	United States	Shoreline Amphitheatre	Paul Russell; Chris Olsen	17,087 / 17,087	$736,822
October 19	Inglewood	United States	Kia Forum	Natasha Bedingfield; Paul Russell; Chris Olsen	—	—
Total					259,663 / 259,663	$14,100,000
