= Donda (company) =

Creative content company founded by Kanye West

- Founded: January 5, 2012; 14 years ago
- Founder: Kanye West
- Key people: Virgil Abloh (creative director); Joe Perez (art director)
- Products: Films; music videos; cover art; prints; stage design; marketing
- Brands: Donda Sports

Donda (styled in all caps) is a creative content company founded by American rapper Kanye West. The company was named after West's late mother, Donda West, and shares the name with his tenth studio album, released in 2021.

== History ==
West announced the company on January 5, 2012, via a series of Twitter posts. In his announcement, West proclaimed that the company would "pick up where Steve Jobs left off"; Donda would operate as "a design company which will galvanize amazing thinkers in a creative space to bounce their dreams and ideas" with the "goal to make products and experiences that people want and can afford."

== Culture ==
West was secretive about the company's operations, maintaining neither an official website nor a social media presence.

In stating Donda's creative philosophy, West articulated the need to "put creatives in a room together with like minds" in order to "simplify and aesthetically improve everything we see, taste, touch, and feel". Contemporary critics have noted the consistent minimalistic aesthetic exhibited throughout Donda creative projects.

Continuing a trend consistent in previous Kanye West projects, an additional hallmark of Donda projects has been multi-disciplinary collaboration, often featuring prominent contributions from major figures in various creative fields. Prominent examples include painter George Condo, photographer Luis Tarin, video artist/film director Steve McQueen, performance artist Vanessa Beecroft, artist Wes Lang, stage designer Es Devlin, audio/visual designer Jadis Mercado, artist/sculptor Takashi Murakami, photographer Jackie Nickerson, fashion designer Riccardo Tisci, and fashion house Maison Martin Margiela. NFL wide receiver Antonio Brown is the chair president of the sports fashion line Donda Sports.

== Projects ==
=== Film ===
On May 23, 2012, Donda debuted its inaugural creative project, a film entitled Cruel Summer, as part of the 2012 Cannes Film Festival. The film is a seven-screen surround vision experience.

Cruel Summer was shot using a specialized camera rig, which allowed the directors to capture multiple angles simultaneously. The film, developed in collaboration with the Doha Film Institute, design firm 2x4 and architecture firm OMA, was presented in a specially designed theater — christened "Surround Vision" — featuring seven screens which surrounded the audience.

On March 7, 2015, West debuted a collaborative short film with director Steve McQueen entitled All Day/I Feel Like That. The film premiered at the Fondation Louis Vuitton in Paris, France, followed by its American debut at the Los Angeles County Museum of Art in July 2015.

=== Album/singles art ===
Donda provided packaging design for the following albums and singles:

- Kanye West and Jay-Z, Watch the Throne, released on August 8, 2011.
- Kanye West, Big Sean, Pusha T, and 2 Chainz, "Mercy", released on April 3, 2012.
- Kanye West, Chief Keef, Pusha T, Big Sean, and Jadakiss, "I Don't Like (Remix)", released on May 1, 2012.
- Meek Mill featuring Big Sean, "Burn", released on May 4, 2012.
- Pusha T and Kanye West, "New God Flow", released on July 12, 2012.
- 2 Chainz, Based on a T.R.U. Story, released on August 12, 2012
- Kanye West, Jay Z, and Big Sean, "Clique", released on September 6, 2012.
- GOOD Music, Cruel Summer, released on September 14, 2012.
- Pusha T, "Pain", released on October 8, 2012.
- 2 Chainz, "I'm Different", released on November 8, 2012.
- Pusha T featuring Popcaan and Travis Scott, "Blocka", released on December 5, 2012.
- Lil Wayne, "Love Me", released on January 18, 2013.
- Pusha T, Wrath of Caine mixtape, released on January 28, 2013.
- Pusha T, "Millions", released on January 29, 2013.
- Lil Wayne, I Am Not a Human Being II, released on March 26, 2013.
- Pusha T, "Numbers on the Boards", released on May 10, 2013.
- Kanye West, Yeezus, released on June 18, 2013.
- Pusha T featuring Chris Brown, "Sweet Serenade", released on September 4, 2013.
- 2 Chainz, B.O.A.T.S. II: Me Time, released on September 10, 2013.
- Pusha T, My Name Is My Name, released on October 7, 2013.
- Pusha T, "Lunch Money", released on November 18, 2014.
- Nicki Minaj, The Pinkprint, released on December 15, 2014.
- Kanye West featuring Paul McCartney, "Only One", released on January 1, 2015.
- Big Sean, "Dark Sky Paradise", released on February 24, 2015.
- Kanye West, "All Day", released on March 2, 2015.
- Vic Mensa featuring Kanye West, "U Mad", released on April 10, 2015.
- Tyga, The Gold Album: 18th Dynasty, released on June 23, 2015.
- Pusha T, "Untouchable", released on November 12, 2015.
- Pusha T, "M.F.T.R", released on December 8, 2015.
- Pusha T, "Crutches, Crosses, Caskets", released on December 11, 2015.
- Pusha T, King Push – Darkest Before Dawn: The Prelude, released on December 18, 2015.
- Kanye West, "Real Friends", released on January 8, 2016.
- Kanye West featuring Kendrick Lamar, "No More Parties in LA", released on January 18, 2016.
- Kanye West, "30 Hours", released on February 12, 2016.
- Kanye West, Gucci Mane, Big Sean, 2 Chainz, Travis Scott, Yo Gotti, Quavo, and Desiigner, "Champions", released on June 12, 2016.

=== Music videos ===
- Kanye West, "Black Skinhead" (Directed by Nick Knight), released on July 22, 2013.
- Big Sean, "Beware" (Directed by Matthew Williams), released on August 16, 2013.
- Kanye West, "Bound 2" (Directed by Nick Knight), released on November 16, 2013.
- Kanye West, "Only One" (Directed by Spike Jonze, Concept by Vanessa Beecroft), released on January 29, 2015.
- Kanye West, "All Day" / "I Feel Like That" (Directed by Steve McQueen)

=== Print ===
- Complex "GOOD Music: New Religion" cover story and article, printed on July 23, 2012.
- Kanye West and Adidas Originals — Season 1 Zine. Photography by Jackie Nickerson. Released on March 11, 2015.
- Kim Kardashian, Selfish, published on May 5, 2015.
- Rich Wilkerson Jr., Sandcastle Kings: Meeting Jesus in a Spiritually Bankrupt World cover art, published on November 10, 2015.

=== Stage design ===
- Kanye West — "Surround Vision" concert, debuted at Revel Atlantic City on December 28, 2012.
- Kanye West — The Yeezus Tour, debuted at Key Arena, Seattle, WA on October 19, 2013.
- Kanye West — "All Day", debuted at the Brit Awards, February 25, 2015.
- Kanye West — "Surround Vision" benefit concert, debuted at Fondation Louis Vuitton on March 6, 2015.

=== Marketing ===
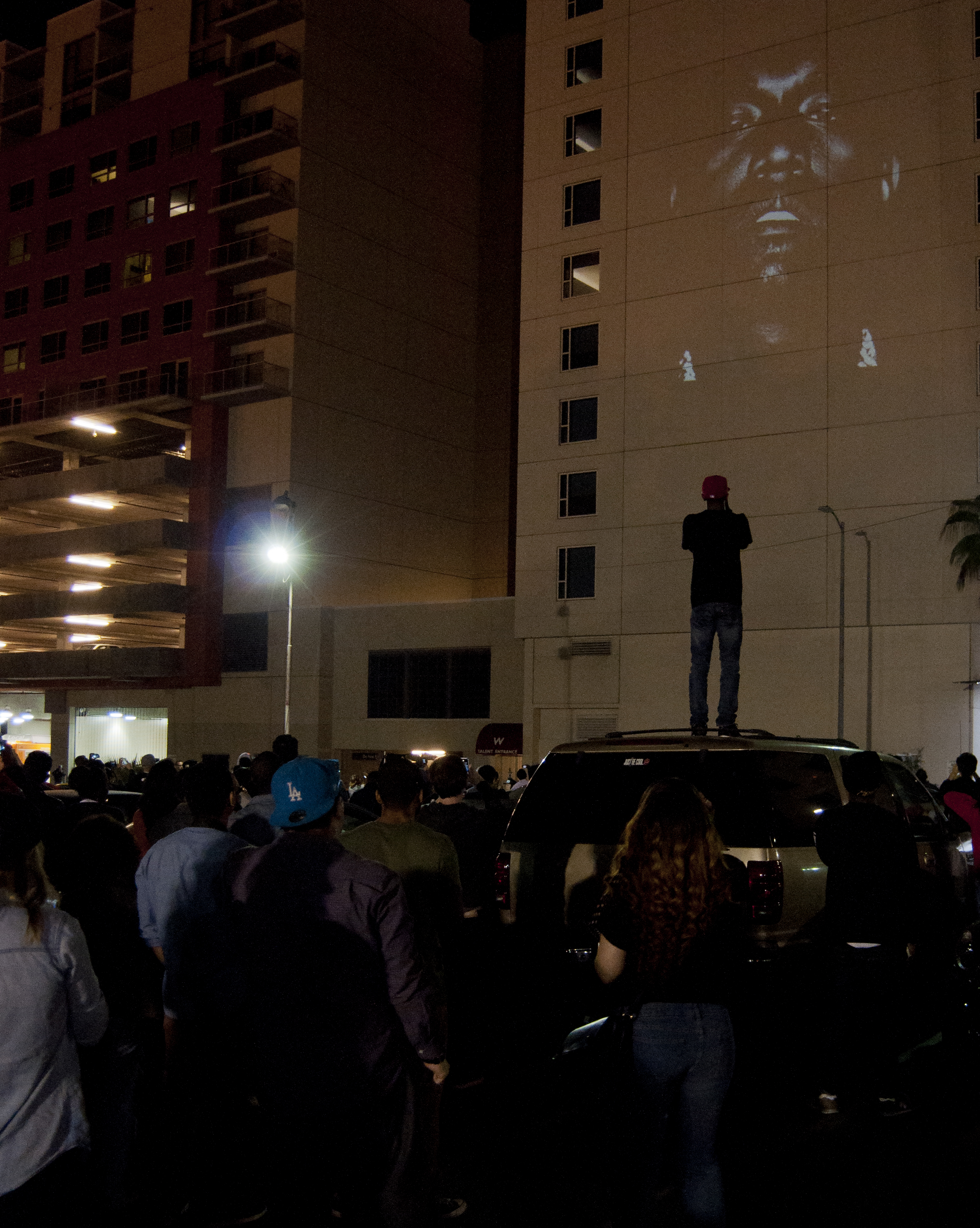
The video for West's "New Slaves" was projected using guerrilla methods on over 60 buildings worldwide.

Prominent marketing projects include:

- Worldwide "New Slaves" guerrilla projection campaign.
- Yeezus "Please Add Graffiti" advertising project.
- American Psycho homage short film, starring Scott Disick and Jonathan Cheban. Released June 17, 2013.
- "The Canyons" trailer remix, released August 2, 2015.
- Kanye West and Adidas Originals — Season One rollout & invitation campaign. February 13, 2015.

== See also ==
- List of unreleased projects by Kanye West
