= Khloé Kardashian =

American media personality (born 1984)

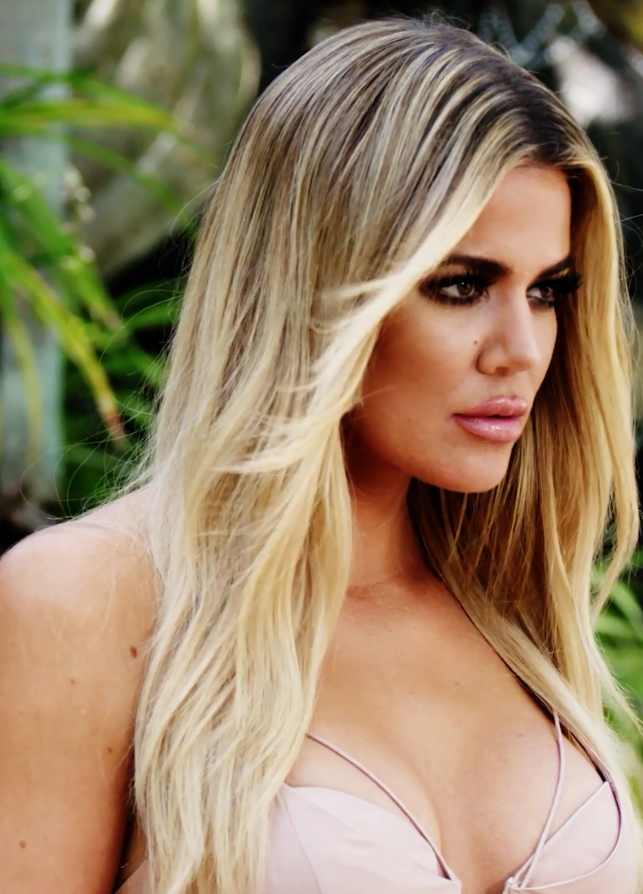
- Kardashian in 2016
- Born: Khloe Alexandra Kardashian (Note: Naming laws in California do not allow special letters with accents (é).); June 27, 1984 (age 42); Los Angeles, California, U.S.
- Other name: Khloé Kardashian Odom
- Occupations: Media personality; socialite; businesswoman
- Years active: 2007–present
- Spouse: Lamar Odom (m. 2009; div. 2016)
- Partner: Tristan Thompson (2016–2021)
- Children: 2
- Parents: Robert Kardashian; Kris Jenner
- Relatives: Kardashian family

Khloé Alexandra Kardashian (/ˈkloʊi/; (Note: Although the name is correctly pronounced /ˈkloʊeɪ/, given the special letter with an accent (é), Kardashian herself uses /ˈkloʊi/.) born June 27, 1984) is an American media personality, socialite, and businesswoman. She rose to fame starring with her family in the reality television series Keeping Up with the Kardashians from 2007 to 2021. Its success led to the creation of spin-offs, including Kourtney and Khloé Take Miami (2009–2013) and Kourtney and Khloé Take The Hamptons (2014–2015). Following the ending of their previous show, she and her family began starring on Hulu's The Kardashians in 2022.

From September 2009 to December 2016, Kardashian was married to basketball player Lamar Odom, whom she married one month after they first met. They starred in their own reality television series, Khloé & Lamar (2011–2012). In 2009, Kardashian participated in the second season of The Celebrity Apprentice, finishing 10th of 16 candidates after being fired by Donald Trump. In 2012, she co-hosted the second season of the American adaptation of The X Factor with actor Mario Lopez. In 2016, Kardashian hosted her own talk show, Kocktails with Khloé. She starred in and produced health and fitness docu-series Revenge Body with Khloé Kardashian from 2017 to 2019. In 2025, she began hosting her own weekly podcast called Khloe in Wonderland.

Kardashian has been involved in the retail and fashion industries with her sisters Kourtney and Kim. They have launched several clothing collections and fragrances, and additionally released the book Kardashian Konfidential in 2010. The Dash boutique employees starred in their own short-lived reality television series, Dash Dolls (2015). In 2016, she established and launched her own female fashion brand Good American, alongside Briton Emma Grede. In 2025, she launched a protein popcorn, Khloud by Khloe Kardashian.

== Early life ==
Khloé Alexandra Kardashian was born on June 27, 1984, in Los Angeles, California, to Kris (née Houghton), a homemaker, and Robert, an attorney. She has two older sisters, Kourtney and Kim, and a younger brother, Rob. Their mother is of Dutch, English, Irish and Scottish ancestry, while their father was a third-generation Armenian-American. After her parents divorced in 1991, her mother married 1976 Summer Olympics decathlon winner Caitlyn Jenner (then Bruce) (Note: Jenner changed her name due to gender transition in 2015.) in 1991. Through their marriage, Kardashian gained stepbrothers Burt, Brandon, and Brody; stepsister Casey; and half-sisters Kendall and Kylie. In 1994, her father garnered public attention as a defense lawyer for football player O. J. Simpson during his murder trial.

Kardashian went to Bel Air Prep, Saint Martin of Tours School, Daniel Webster Middle School, A.E. Wright Middle School, and Montclair Prep. As a teenager, she briefly attended Marymount High School, a Roman Catholic all-girls' school in Los Angeles. She left the high school and enrolled in Alexandria Academy, an alternative one-to-one school, after her sisters' graduations, later saying "there was no reason for me to stay" since she "felt like I didn't have any friends." She graduated with honors a year early at age 17. Before her family reality TV show, Kardashian worked as Nicole Richie's assistant.

== Career ==
=== 2007–2009: Career beginnings ===
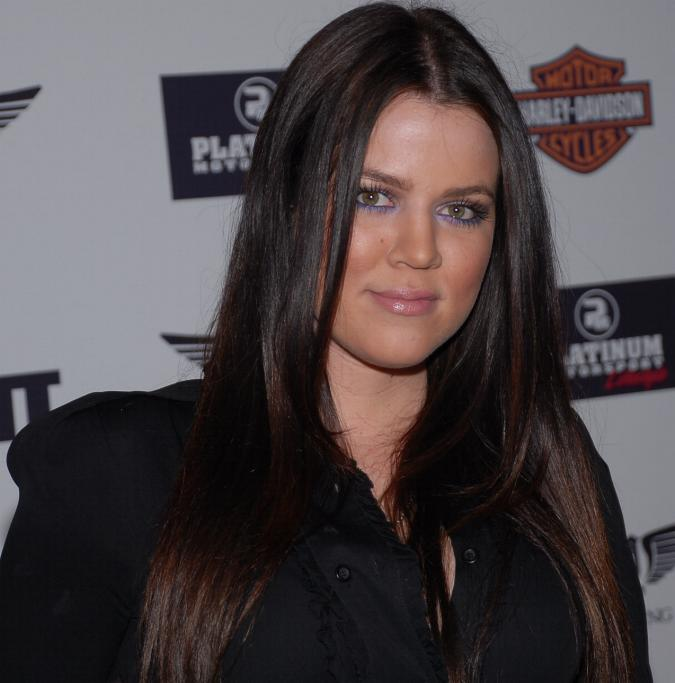
Kardashian in 2007

In February 2007, a 2003 sex tape made by sister Kim Kardashian and her former boyfriend Ray J, Kim Kardashian, Superstar, was leaked, which contributed to the family's rise in popularity. Later that year, Khloé; her mother Kris; her stepparent Caitlyn; her siblings Kourtney, Kim, and Rob; and half-sisters Kendall and Kylie were commissioned to star in the reality television series Keeping Up with the Kardashians. The series and her sister Kim's popularity led to the Kardashians being able to cash in by endorsing products. These include waist-slimming pants, beauty products and Coca-Cola, for which they are paid (as of 2016) $75,000 per post on Instagram, Facebook and Twitter.

The series proved successful for E!, the network on which it is broadcast, and has led to the creations of spin-offs including Kourtney and Khloé Take Miami and Khloé & Lamar.

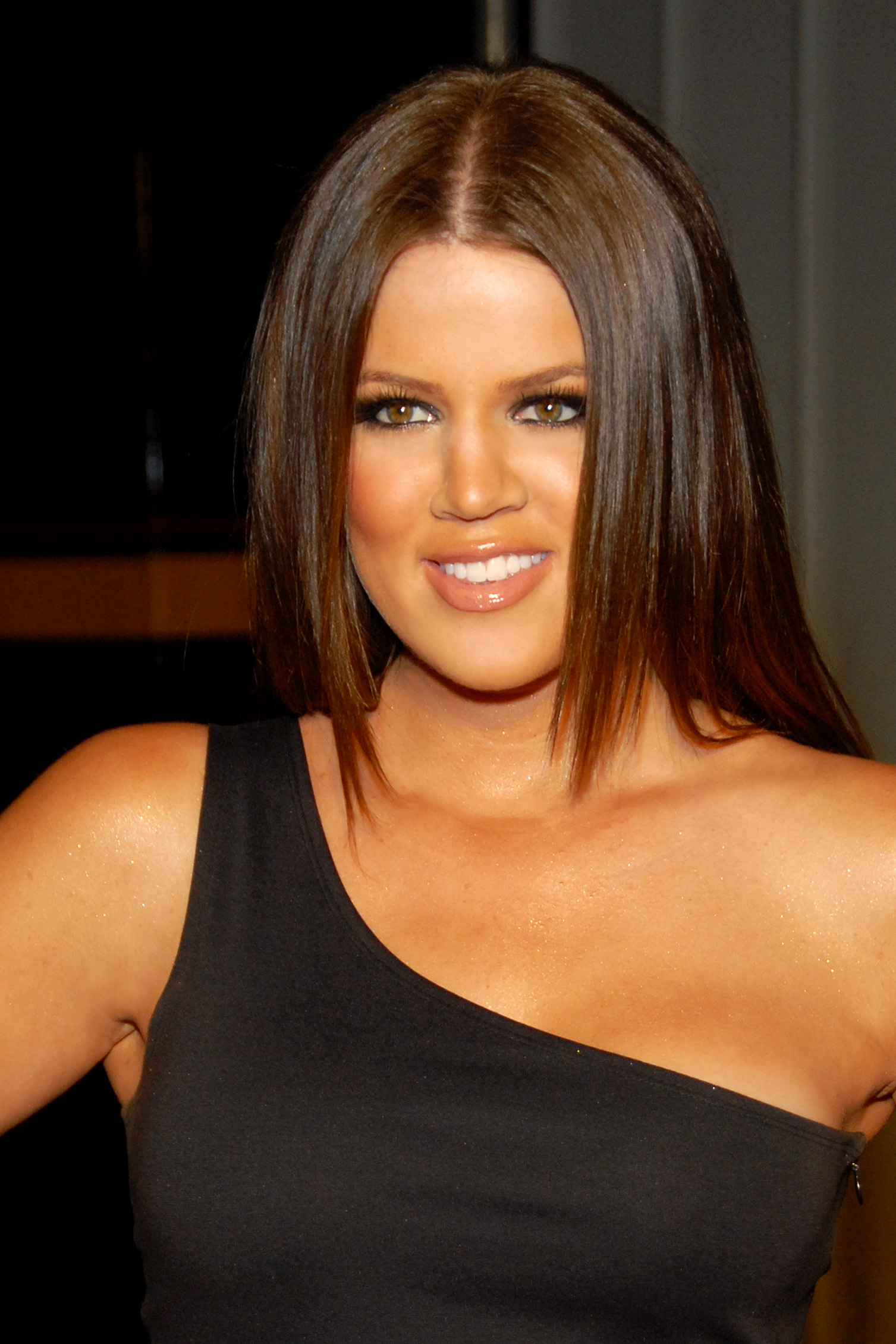
Kardashian in 2009

In April 2009, Kardashian and her sister Kourtney announced that they were contracted to star in a spin-off that would follow their move to launch a D-A-S-H store in Miami, Florida. The series, Kourtney and Khloé Take Miami, debuted on E! on August 16, 2009. Starting May 29, 2009, Kardashian joined Miami Top 40 Mainstream outlet WHYI for a weekly four-hour talk/entertainment program, co-hosted by 106 & Park's Terrence J. Khloé and her sisters Kim and Kourtney made a cameo appearance in the Season 3 premiere of the series 90210. Kardashian made an appearance in episodes 2, 4, and 8 of Kourtney and Kim Take New York, which premiered in January 2011. On April 10, 2011, Khloé & Lamar, Kardashian's own show with her then-husband, Lamar Odom, debuted.

Kardashian participated in the second season of The Celebrity Apprentice, finishing 10th of 16 candidates by being fired by Donald Trump. It was reported she was fired because of her previous arrest for a DUI. In June 2009, Khloé and her sisters teamed up with the Natural Products Association to create a teeth whitening pen called Idol White. Kardashian appeared in one of PETA's "I'd Rather Go Naked Than Wear Fur" campaigns. The three sisters released a jewelry line in March 2010. In the spring of 2010, the sisters released a clothing line for Bebe. Bebe announced they were dropping the line in December 2010. In September 2010, Kardashian and her sisters released another clothing line, K-Dash on QVC. Kardashian and her sisters marketed a fake tan product, released in 2010 and called Kardashian Glamour Tan.

=== 2010–2017: Television and other ventures ===
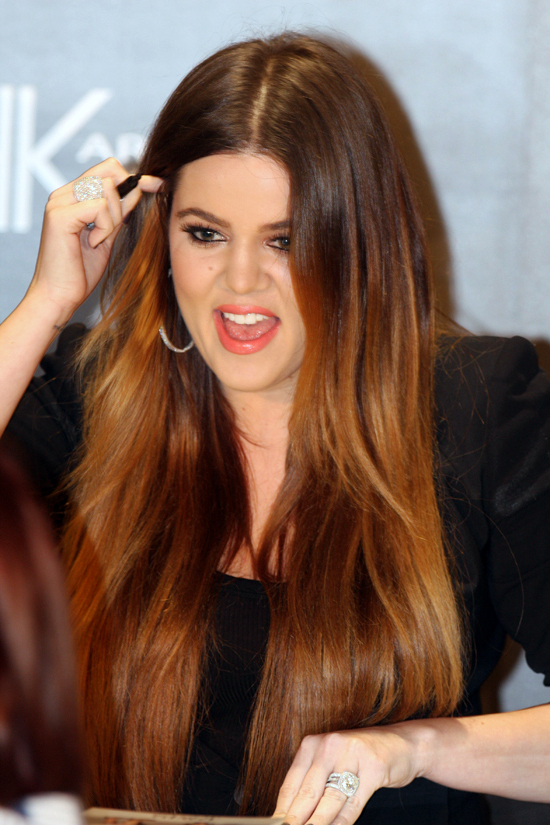
Kardashian, 2011

The sisters also released a book, Kardashian Konfidential, in November 2010. In February 2011, Kardashian and her husband released a unisex fragrance called "Unbreakable." In May 2011, Kardashian and her sisters announced the release of their first novel. Prior to publication, the sisters requested help with naming their book. The winner was offered a cameo appearance in the novel. In July 2011, it was announced that the winning title was Dollhouse. In October 2012, Kardashian and Odom released a second unisex fragrance, "Unbreakable Joy," inspired by the holiday season.

Kardashian's radio show, The Mix Up With Khloé Kardashian Odom, was a "one-hour, commercial-free show where Kardashian will take requests, chat with her celebrity friends, and more during the Mavericks' season while she's in Dallas with her husband Lamar Odom." It aired on January 30, 2012. She later made an appearance on the MTV television series Punk'd with Kelly Osbourne and Miley Cyrus in February 2012. In October 2012, Kardashian and Mario Lopez were confirmed as the co-hosts of the second season of the American version of The X Factor. It was confirmed on April 22, 2013, that Kardashian will not return to co-host The X Factor for its third season.

On March 26, 2014, E! announced a Keeping Up with the Kardashians spin-off series titled Kourtney & Khloé Take the Hamptons. The Hamptons follows Kourtney, Khloé, and Scott Disick as they relocate to The Hamptons while the girls work on the New York Dash store plus open a pop-up store.

In 2015 she published her first solo-book titled Strong Looks Better Naked.

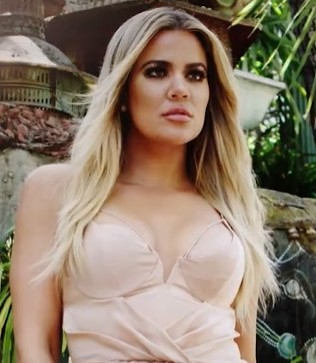
Kardashian in 2016

In January 2016, Kardashian hosted the Kocktails with Khloé pop culture–themed variety talk show, which aired on the FYI cable channel. The show was cancelled after 14 episodes. Kardashian and business woman Emma Grede launched their clothing line Good American in the same year, and made $1 million in sales on the first day. Good American started by selling jeans ranging from size 00 to 24 and has expanded to a variety of clothes including workout clothes, dresses and a maternity collection. Kardashian starred and produced Revenge Body with Khloé Kardashian, an American reality television series that premiered on the E! cable network, on January 12, 2017.

=== 2018–present: Business and continued television success ===
In December 2018, Kardashian became the brand ambassador of Burst Oral Care & performed corn test on the electric toothbrush. On June 14, 2019, Kylie Cosmetics launched their collaboration with Kardashian called Kylie Cosmetics x Koko Kollection. This marked their third collaboration, after previously launched special collection of lip products called Koko Kollection in 2016 and the second part in 2017. In August 2019, Kardashian announced she will become an executive producer for the new season of Twisted Sisters, an Investigation Discovery show, consisting of ten hour-long episodes following stories of sisters who turned on each other. In November 2019, Kardashian partnered with her sisters Kourtney and Kim to create three new perfumes (one for each sister) for Kim's brand KKW Fragrance. The collection introduces Pink Diamond (Khloé's fragrance), Yellow Diamond (Kourtney's fragrance) and pure Diamond (Kim's fragrance). Each scent is individually inspired by and unique to her, Kim, and Kourtney. In October 2020, it was announced she became the brand ambassador and co-owner of Kiwi collagen supplement company Dose & Co.

In 2021, Kardashian and her family announced that their reality show, Keeping Up with the Kardashians, would be ending after twenty seasons and almost 15 years on air.

In September 2021, Khloe Kardashian hosted a tournament for Candy Crush Saga, marking the game's first tournament. The tournament was held in-app from September 23 until October 7.

In April 2022, Kardashian and her family returned to the television screens with their brand new reality television show, titled The Kardashians, after they left the E! Network to join Hulu. The show features Kardashian, alongside her sisters Kourtney, Kim, Kendall and Kylie, and mother Kris Jenner, it also features ex and current partners including Scott Disick, Travis Barker, Kardashian's ex Tristan Thompson, and Corey Gamble, with Kanye West making a guest appearance. The first season premiered on April 14, 2022, and its ten episodes can be streamed exclusively on Disney+. Later in 2022, the show was announced to be returning for a second season, which officially premiered on September 22, 2022. In late 2022, it was announced that the show had been officially renewed for a third season, set to premier in the first half of 2023. The third season officially aired on May 25, 2023. This was followed by a fourth season in September 2023, a fifth season in May 2024, and a sixth season in February 2025.

In 2024, Kardashian announced the forthcoming release of her first ever video podcast series on X. She officially launched the podcast in January 2025, titled Khloe in Wonderland and it became available on all major audio streaming services. The show is produced weekly. In April 2025, Kardashian released her own popcorn brand called Khloud by Khloe Kardashian.

== Public image ==
Kardashian has received criticism and negative comments which were focused on her body since Keeping Up with the Kardashians premiered in 2007. She has been compared to her sisters Kourtney and Kim with Kardashian recalling "I didn't really realize that I was 'the fat sister' if you will until I went on TV and the media started saying that about me. I knew I didn't look like my sisters and I didn't have those shapes, but I didn't think that was wrong". Kardashian's physique, notably her face, has attracted significant attention from the media and public in recent years. She has received comments from the public regularly saying she looks "unrecognisable". However, Kardashian has denied having surgery, stating that when she lost weight she lost fat in her face and also credits her make-up artist. She has also been open to using photo editing app Facetune, and stated "Facetune is the best thing to bring to the table. It's life-changing" in February 2016.

== Personal life ==
=== Health ===
In 2001, Kardashian suffered a traumatic brain injury in a car accident. She went through the windshield and suffered a severe concussion, causing long-term memory loss. In October 2022, Kardashian revealed she had had a "rare" tumor removed from her face, having initially assumed it to be a zit. She had previously had an operation to remove melanoma when she was 19 years old.

=== Relationships ===
Kardashian dated basketball player Rashad McCants in 2008. The two broke up after seven months in late January 2009.

On September 27, 2009, Kardashian married professional basketball player Lamar Odom, who was a member of the Los Angeles Lakers at the time. The couple were married exactly one month after they met at a party for Odom's teammate Metta World Peace. Kardashian removed her middle name and took her husband's surname, becoming Khloé Kardashian Odom. Kardashian purchased a pet boxer named Bernard "BHops" Hopkins, after Bernard Hopkins, the boxer. On December 13, 2013, after months of speculated separation, Kardashian filed for divorce from Odom and for legal restoration of her last name. Both parties signed divorce papers in July 2015. The divorce had yet to receive final approval from a judge in October 2015, when Odom was hospitalized after being found unconscious in a Nevada brothel. He was in a coma for four days; as he lay in a hospital, Kardashian withdrew her pending divorce petition. In an interview with People Magazine, Kardashian confirmed that they had not reconciled, but the divorce had been withdrawn so that she could make medical decisions on Odom's behalf. Kardashian and Odom's divorce was finalized in December 2016.

In January 2014, she began on-again, off-again relationship with rapper French Montana. They broke up in December that year. Kardashian started dating basketball player James Harden after meeting at brother-in-law Kanye West's Staples Center birthday party in 2015. The two were together for eight months between 2015 and 2016.

Kardashian began dating basketball player Tristan Thompson in 2016. Kardashian gave birth to a daughter, True Thompson, on April 12, 2018, amidst controversy after Thompson was found to have cheated on Kardashian during her pregnancy. In February 2019, Kardashian and Thompson split after it was revealed that Thompson had allegedly cheated on Kardashian with her younger half-sister Kylie Jenner's then-best friend Jordyn Woods. After quarantining together during the COVID-19 pandemic for the sake of their daughter, they ended up rekindling their relationship in August 2020. They became engaged in February 2021, but split for good in December 2021, when it was revealed that Thompson had cheated on Kardashian again in March 2021, and fathered a son who was born in December 2021. In July 2022, it was announced that Kardashian and Thompson were expecting a baby boy via surrogacy, who was conceived before Kardashian discovered Thompson's cheating. Their son, Tatum, was born on July 28, 2022.

=== Activism ===
Kardashian supports the recognition of the Armenian genocide and has visited Tsitsernakaberd, the memorial to the victims in Yerevan, Armenia. In April 2021, Kardashian praised President Joe Biden for officially recognizing the Armenian Genocide, thus becoming the first US president to do so.

In October 2020, Kardashian spoke out in support of Republic of Artsakh and Armenians, condemning Azerbaijan's involvement in the 2020 Nagorno-Karabakh conflict. On October 10, 2020, she spoke on the ArmeniaFund fundraising telethon and urged viewers to donate money to help those impacted by the recent war.

=== Religion ===
Kardashian is a Christian and reads a daily devotional to herself and her "glam squad" every day. She is interested in theology and enjoys attending church. In April 2015, she was named godmother of her niece North West, by Kim and Kanye, as the child was baptized in the Armenian Apostolic Church at the Cathedral of St. James in Jerusalem.

=== Legal issues ===
On March 4, 2007, Kardashian was arrested for driving under the influence. On July 18, 2008, she reported to jail to serve time for violation of probation. She faced a sentence of up to 30 days and enrollment in an alcohol treatment program within three weeks of her release from jail. She was released less than three hours later due to overcrowding.

In December 2011, Kardashian was sued by a woman who claimed Kardashian and 10 other people assaulted her outside a nightclub in December 2009.

In March 2012, Kardashian and her sisters Kourtney and Kim were named in a $5 million class-action lawsuit against QuickTrim, the weight-loss supplement they endorse. The complaint, filed in the United States District Court for the Southern District of New York, accuses the Kardashians (along with QuickTrim's manufacturer, Windmill Health Products; the retailer GNC; and others in the sales and marketing chain) of false and deceptive marketing of the diet aid. The plaintiffs, hailing from several states, brought claims under their respective states' consumer protection laws.

== Filmography ==
=== Acting credits ===
Year	Title	Role	Notes
2010	Psychotherapist	Dannii Hillman	

=== As herself ===
Year	Title	Notes
2007–2021	Keeping Up with the Kardashians	Main role, 241 episodes
2008	Mad TV	2 episodes
2009	The Celebrity Apprentice	11 episodes
2009–10	Kourtney and Khloé Take Miami	Main role, 26 episodes
2010	Fashion Police	5 episodes
2010	90210	Episode: "Senior Year, Baby"
2010	When I Was 17	
2011–12	Kourtney and Kim Take New York	7 episodes
2011–12	Khloé & Lamar	Main role, 20 episodes
2011	Law & Order: LA	Episode: "Benedict Canyon"
2012	Punk'd	Episode: "Miley Cyrus"
2012	The X Factor	Co-host; 16 episodes
2013	Real Husbands of Hollywood	
2014	Don't Panic	Music video
2014–15	Kourtney and Khloé Take The Hamptons	TV series
2014	Royal Pains	Cameo, 1 episode
2015	I Am Cait	3 episodes
2015	Dash Dolls	Executive producer & recurring role
2016	Kocktails with Khloé	Host
2017–19	Revenge Body with Khloé Kardashian	Host & executive producer
2019	Flip It Like Disick	Guest appearance, 1 episode
2020	Twisted Sisters	Executive producer
2022–present	The Kardashians	Main role

== Bibliography ==
- Kardashian, Kim; Kardashian, Kourtney; Kardashian, Khloé (2010). Kardashian Konfidential. St. Martin's Press. ISBN 978-0-312-62807-9.
- Kardashian, Kim; Kardashian, Kourtney; Kardashian, Khloé (2011). Dollhouse. William Morrow. ISBN 9780062063847.
- Kardashian, Khloe (2015). Strong Looks Better Naked. Regan Arts. ISBN 9781682450772.

== See also ==
- Famous for being famous
- List of most-followed Instagram accounts
