= H8R =

- Promotional image
- Genre: Reality
- Created by: Lisa Gregorisch-Dempsey
- Presented by: Mario Lopez
- Country of origin: United States
- Original language: English
- No. of seasons: 1
- No. of episodes: 6 (2 unaired)

Production
- Executive producers: Lisa Gregorisch-Dempsey; Jeremy Spiegel; Mike Fleiss; Mario Lopez
- Running time: 45 minutes
- Production companies: Warner Horizon Television; Lisa G Productions; Next Entertainment

Original release
- Network: The CW
- Release: September 14 – October 5, 2011

H8R (a texting abbreviation for Hater) is an American television series for The CW. The hour-long series, hosted by Mario Lopez, premiered Wednesday, September 14, 2011. Due to low ratings, the show was canceled by the network on October 6, 2011, after broadcasting four episodes.

== Premise ==
The program featured celebrities confronting someone critical of their success, career, lifestyle, or fame while attempting to win them over and convince them that their animosity was misdirected.

== Production ==
H8R was first announced to be in development on January 24, 2011.

The pilot episode, which was broken into different segments upon airing, featured television personalities Kim Kardashian and Nicole "Snooki" Polizzi confronting people from the general public who were critical of their success. On May 19, 2011, The CW ordered the project to series. With the disclosure of The CW's 2011–12 schedule, it was announced the series would air on Wednesday nights at 8:00 pm Eastern/7:00 pm Central as a lead-in to America's Next Top Model.

In July 2011, The Bachelor creator Mike Fleiss joined the series as an executive producer. The series premiered on Wednesday, September 14, 2011. The show had more than 20 celebrities lined up for the first season, including Janice Dickinson, Levi Johnston, Kat Von D, and Barry Bonds. Had the series not been canceled, the producers had hoped to book Sarah Palin, Joan Rivers, Mel Gibson and Lady Gaga for future episodes.

On October 6, 2011, the series was cancelled by the network. It was suggested they would be burned off during the summer season, but this never came to be, and two episodes remain unseen to audiences.

== Reception ==
Critical reception for H8R was negative, and a number of critics cited the show's questionable morality in tracking negative anonymous internet commenters whose comments, under normal circumstances, would not have brought them into the spotlight for "bullying" a celebrity.

== Episodes ==
No.	Title	Original release date	U.S. viewers (millions)
1	"Snooki"	September 14, 2011	1.29
Snooki & former star of The Bachelor, Jake Pavelka.
2	"Eva Longoria"	September 21, 2011	1.03
Actress Eva Longoria of Desperate Housewives & Scott Disick of Keeping Up with the Kardashians.
3	"Kim Kardashian"	September 28, 2011	1.37
Kim Kardashian & Girls Gone Wild creator Joe Francis.
4	"Maksim Chmerkovskiy"	October 5, 2011	1.07
Dancing with the Stars dancer Maksim Chmerkovskiy & WWE wrestler The Miz.
5	"Selena Gomez"	Unaired	N/A
Former Disney Channel star Selena Gomez.
