= Nosetalgia =

Single by Pusha T featuring Kendrick Lamar

from the album My Name Is My Name
- Released: February 3, 2014
- Recorded: 2013
- Genre: Hip hop
- Length: 3:36
- Label: GOOD Music; Def Jam
- Songwriters: Terrence Thornton; Kanye West; Dominick Lamb; Anthony Khan; Kendrick Duckworth; Scott La Rock; Lawrence Parker; Homer Banks; Carl Hampton; Raymond Jackson; Trevor Horn; Malcolm McLaren
- Producers: Nottz; Kanye West; The Twilite Tone (add.)

Pusha T singles chronology
"I'll Be Gone (Vice Remix)" (2013)	"Nosetalgia" (2014)	"Move That Dope" (2014)

Kendrick Lamar singles chronology
"Radioactive" (remix) (2014)	"Nosetalgia" (2014)	"It's On Again" (2014)

"Nosetalgia" (a portmanteau of "nose" and "nostalgia") is a song by American rapper Pusha T featuring fellow rapper Kendrick Lamar from his debut studio album My Name Is My Name (2013). "Nosetalgia" features production handled by Nottz, Kanye West and additional production by the Twilite Tone. The song features both artists rapping about their experiences and effects of cocaine on their childhoods. On February 3, 2014, the song was officially released as a single in the United Kingdom by GOOD Music and Def Jam Recordings as the album's fifth official single.

== Background ==
On September 16, 2013, Def Jam released the single artwork, and announced that "Nosetalgia" featuring Kendrick Lamar would be released soon. Later that same day the song would be premiered via Def Jam's website and then on Funkmaster Flex's Hot 97 radio show. The song's spare, nimble beat was produced by Nottz and Kanye West. Its production contains a "muggy guitar, rattling clave, dinosaur-plodding drums, and the occasional KRS-One vocal sample of Boogie Down Productions' "The Bridge Is Over". The song also samples Bobby Bland's "(If Loving You Is Wrong) I Don't Want to Be Right" and Malcolm McLaren & World's Famous Supreme Team's "D'Ya Like Scratchin'?". The following day it would be released to DJs as the album's third promotional single, and then be released for pre-order with the album on iTunes. "Nosetalgia" was officially released as a single in the United Kingdom on February 3, 2014, serving as the fifth overall single from the album.

== Music and lyrics ==
The two rappers gave a different perspective of the drug epidemic that was going on in late 1980s and early 90s, as the two were growing up. Lamar looks at it how it affected his family and him. While Pusha T goes into his life, junior high and high school as he was the one selling it. Pusha T also expounds on all of the luxuries being a young kingpin.

Starting his verse, Kendrick Lamar raps, "You wanna see a dead body?" making reference to a famous scene from the film Boyz n the Hood. From there, Kendrick raps about his missing Sega Genesis video games, which he assumes were stolen by his aunt to fund her drug use. He goes on to rap about his father's drug dealing and substance abuse throughout Lamar's childhood. By the end of his verse, Lamar brings it all together, saying "his music is "dope," comparing the high quality of his rhymes to the drugs (dope) that plagued his family while he was growing up. Pusha T raps about drug mules and Pyrex pots, which he used to turn cocaine to crack.

== Critical reception ==
"Nosetalgia" was met with critical acclaim from music critics. Emanuel Wallace of PopMatters called it the album's "superlative" track. Writing for The Boston Globe, Ken Capobianco named the song the album's essential track and called Lamar's guest appearance the best one of the album. Louis Pattison of NME called it one of the album's finest moments. Jake Jenkins of AbsolutePunk said, "Pusha and Kendrick are a match made in heaven, and picking who had the better verse here is a near impossible task." Writing for NOW, Max Mertens praised Lamar's verse and named it the album's best song. Jay Soul of RapReviews called the song an immediate standout and an unimpeachable classic. Grant Brydon of Clash said the song showcases Pusha T at his unadulterated finest.

Alec Siegel of DJBooth said, "album standout "Nosetalgia" is as raw as it gets. [...] The understated beat with a crying guitar riff and a KRS-One vocal sample, co-produced by Nottz and Kanye West, is about as spooky as the verses provided by Pusha and guest Kendrick Lamar. The two rhyme about their personal past dealings with coke, and Kendrick, as is often the case, highjacks the track." Mike Powell of Rolling Stone gave the song three out of five stars saying, "After years of awkward reinventions, "Nosetalgia" finds Pusha T in something like classic form: mellow but menacing, tracing his coke-dealer creation myth from cold streets back to a baby's crib.” Jabbari Weekes of Exclaim! called the song menacing. Jesse Cataldo of Slant Magazine called the song a "tedious bit of dealing/rapping parallelism that benefits greatly from the sharp narrative [Lamar] forms." Belgium magazine Le Vif/L'Express named it the 49th best song of 2013. PopMatters choose it as the 41st best song of 2013.

== Music video ==
The music video for "Nosetalgia" was filmed in Lamar's hometown Compton, California. On October 3, 2013, the minimal, black-and-white music video was released. To start the video, Pusha T walks by himself down a dark block in Compton at night, as the camera swings around from his back to his front, just in time for him to start his verse. The street that Pusha walks down in the video is eerily empty, until Lamar shows up to rap his verse and then the two rappers walk down the street together as the song ends.

== Track listing ==
Digital Single

No.	Title	Writer(s)	Producer(s)	Length
1.	"Nosetalgia" (featuring Kendrick Lamar)	Terrence Thornton; Kanye West; Dominick Lamb; Anthony Khan; Kendrick Duckworth; Scott La Rock; Lawrence Parker; Homer Banks; Carl Hampton; Raymond Jackson; Trevor Horn; Malcolm McLaren	Nottz; Kanye West; The Twilite Tone (add.)	3:36

== Chart performance ==
Chart (2013)	Peak position
US Billboard R&B/Hip-Hop Digital Songs	50
US Billboard Rap Digital Songs	35
