= Kocktails with Khloé =

- Genre: Variety show; Talk show
- Presented by: Khloé Kardashian
- Country of origin: United States
- Original language: English
- No. of seasons: 1
- No. of episodes: 14

Production
- Executive producers: Khloé Kardashian; Craig Piligian; Derek W. Wan; Gena McCarthy; Toby Faulkner; Lauren Wohl
- Producers: Deondray Gossett; Quincy LeNear; Maria Notaras; Adam Klein
- Running time: 42 minutes
- Production company: Pilgrim Studios

Original release
- Network: FYI
- Release: January 20 – April 20, 2016

Kocktails with Khloé is an American pop culture–themed variety talk show that premiered on the FYI cable channel on January 20, 2016. The series is hosted by reality television personality Khloé Kardashian. In April 2016, FYI cancelled Kocktails with Khloé after one season.

== Production ==
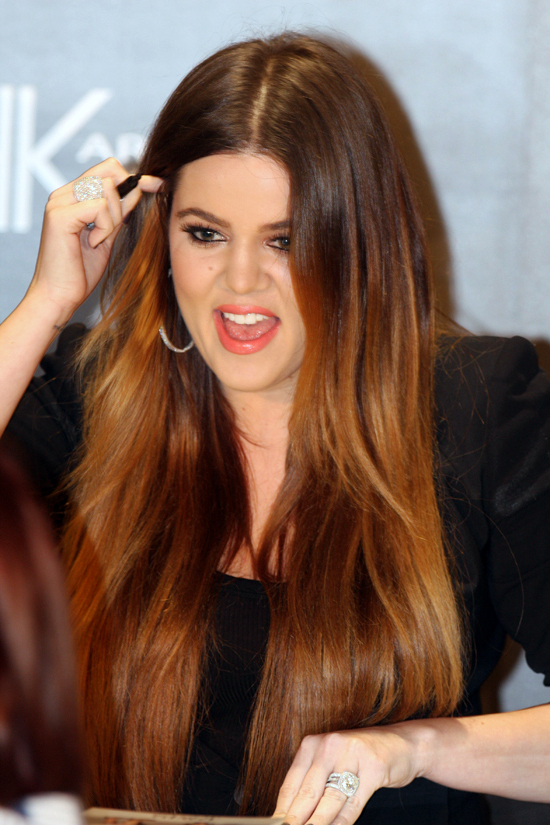
Khloé Kardashian, the host of the show

The series was greenlit on July 21, 2015. The network ordered eight one-hour episodes; the production of Kocktails with Khloé commenced immediately after the announcement. The talk show is hosted by television personality and socialite Khloé Kardashian, who is well known for appearing on the reality television series Keeping Up with the Kardashians and its spin-offs. Apart from appearing on shows with her family, Kardashian has previously participated in several other media projects, including being a co-host on the second season of The X Factor with Mario Lopez in 2012, as well as featuring on DJ for Khloé After Dark on Miami's Y100 radio station in 2009. The talk show is produced by Craig Piligian and Derek W. Wan from Pilgrim Studios, and Gena McCarthy, Toby Faulkner and Lauren Wohl from the network as well as Khloé Kardashian herself. The series is filmed in Los Angeles, California. The show was broadcast on FYI, an American cable network, previously known as The Biography Channel, which features mostly lifestyle-themed programming.

"[The show] is something I’m extremely proud of and I’m excited to execute it with my amazing partners, Pilgrim and FYI," said Kardashian who also serves as the executive producer of the show, "I’m lucky that I’ve been able to invite fans into my life and home on a weekly basis and this show will give me an opportunity to continue to do that with new and exciting guests. [...] I can't wait to show my fans what we have in store on ‘Kocktails With Khloe.'" The show is produced by Pilgrim Studios which describes the upcoming series as "a hybrid talk show" set in a unique intimate format surrounded by celebrity guests and friends. Craig Piligian, an executive producer of the studios, felt positively about the upcoming project by saying:

Khloé Kardashian has emerged as a star in her own right with a gift for remaining funny, warm and relatable while still representing aspirational pop culture. We are thrilled to be in business with Khloé and FYI.

The talk show premiered on January 20, 2016. In April, it was announced that the network cancelled Kocktails with Khloé after one season. The final episode aired on April 20.

== Episodes ==
No.	Title	Original release date	U.S. viewers (millions)
1	"The Happiest Hour"	January 20, 2016	0.35
Khloé invites celebrity guests into her kitchen for a lively dinner party.
2	"Bottoms Up!"	January 27, 2016	0.22
Rapper Tyga; TV personalities Scott Disick, Malika Haqq and Morgan Stewart; YouTube personality Jenna Mourey; chef Sharone Hakman.
3	"Cheers"	February 3, 2016	0.24
Music artist Sean Combs; actor/model RuPaul; television personalities Snooki, Kylie Jenner and Kourtney Kardashian; chef Sharone Hakman.
4	"Raise Your Glass"	February 10, 2016	0.21
Music artists Ne-Yo and T-Pain; actress Tori Spelling; Internet personality King Bach; television personality Sonja Morgan; chef Sharone Hakman.
5	"The Twerktini"	February 17, 2016	N/A
Actor Taye Diggs; actor/former WCW Champion David Arquette; singer Kat DeLuna; actress Katie O'Brien; chef Sharone Hakman.
6	"The Deep Dish"	February 24, 2016	N/A
Actress Carmen Electra; television personality Ross Mathews; singer JoJo (singer); actress Jazsmin Lewis; chef Sharone Hakman.
7	"Drunk In Love"	March 2, 2016	N/A
Actress Lisa Rinna; actor Marlon Yates Jr.; YouTube personality GloZell Green; actor Kirk Fox; chef Sharone Hakman.
8	"Eat, Drink, Pray"	March 9, 2016	0.12
Khloe Kardashian is joined by Vivica A. Fox, Cassie, Alec Mapa and Slink Johnson to dish on their lives, pop culture, fashion, celebrity gossip and more. Adding to the elegant and fun party atmosphere will be chef Sharone Hakman who will collaborate on menus and assist in entertaing.
9	"The Next Door Neighbor"	March 16, 2016	N/A
Khloé Kardashian is joined by Travis Barker, Tia Mowry-Hardrict, Brian J. White, and Lauren Ash to dish on their lives, pop culture, fashion, celebrity gossip and more.
10	"Cocktails for Six"	March 23, 2016	N/A
Khloé is joined by Trey Songz, Kendra Wilkinson Baskett, Jillian Rose Reed and Pauly Shore to dish on their lives, pop culture, fashion and celebrity gossip.
11	"Khloé Kardashian Bares All"	March 30, 2016	N/A
Khloé is joined by Trey Songz, Kendra Wilkinson Baskett, Jillian Rose Reed and Pauly Shore to dish on their lives, pop culture, fashion and celebrity gossip.
12	"Khloé Kardashian Spills the Tea"	April 6, 2016	N/A
Khloé is joined by Tisha Campell-Martin, Jeannie Mai, Ta'Rhonda Jones, Cardi B, and James Maslow to dish on their lives, pop culture, fashion, celebrity gossip and more; Chef Sharone Hakman assists in entertaining.
13	"Khloé Kardashian Spills the O.J."	April 13, 2016	N/A
Khloé is joined by Holly Robinson Peete, Jamie Kennedy, Shanola Hampton and Lance Bass to dish on their lives, pop culture, fashion, celebrity gossip and more; Chef Sharone Hakman will assist in entertaining.
14	"Kimye and Legends"	April 20, 2016	0.14
Khloé is joined by Kim Kardashian West, Kanye West, John Legend and Chrissy Teigen to dish on their lives, pop culture, fashion, celebrity gossip and more; Chef Sharone Hakman assists in entertaining.

== Reception ==
Maria Yagoda, announcing the show for the People magazine, felt very positive about the series and said that "the show’s basic premise (along with the fact that "kocktails" is in the title) is already getting us very excited".

== Broadcast ==
The talk show was initially scheduled to premiere on December 9, 2015, in the United States, but the date later was pushed to January 20, 2016. The eight-episode series is broadcast on the FYI cable network. The show will continue to air in the same time slot for eight consecutive weeks. In the United Kingdom, 4Music acquired the series and it premiered on April 26, 2016.

== See also ==
- Revenge Body with Khloé Kardashian
