= Scott Disick =

American entrepreneur, media personality, and socialite (born 1983)

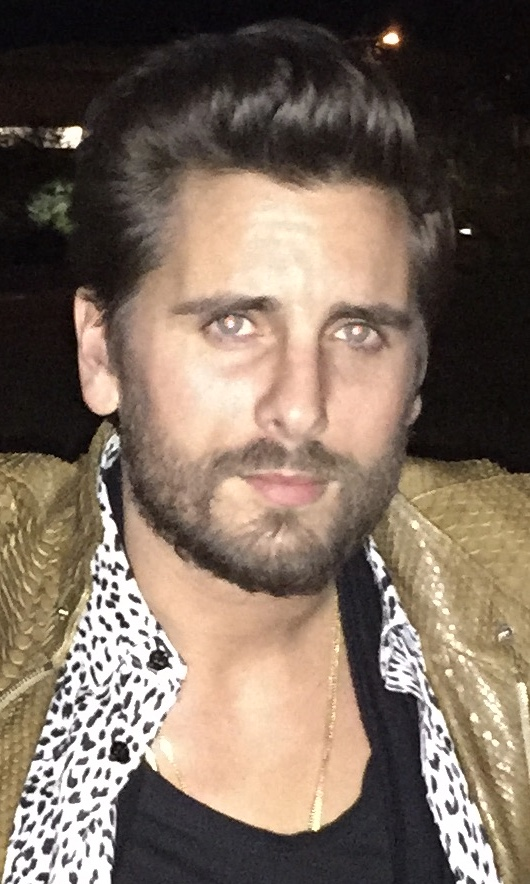
- Disick in January 2015
- Born: Scott Michael Disick; May 26, 1983 (age 43); Eastport, New York, U.S.
- Education: The Ross School
- Occupations: Media personality; entrepreneur
- Years active: 2007–present
- Partner(s): Kourtney Kardashian (2006–2015)
- Children: 3

Scott Michael Disick (born May 26, 1983) also known by his self styled title Lord Disick, is an American media personality, socialite, and entrepreneur widely known for his role as a main cast member on Keeping Up with the Kardashians, during his nine year relationship with Kourtney Kardashian, with whom he shares three children.

In addition to starring on reality shows, he has pursued multiple business ventures, including starting the clothing brand Talentless, investing in nightclubs, running multiple vitamin companies, and house flipping , for which he was the primary subject of his own show, Flip It Like Disick, that aired on E!.

== Early life ==
Disick was born in Eastport, New York, on Long Island, the only child of Jeffrey and Bonnie Disick. His grandfather, David Disick, developed luxury properties, and his father was also a real estate developer. He attended The Ross School in East Hampton, but did not graduate. As a teenager, Scott Disick was a book cover model for the Heartland series. He has always been interested in architecture and often read Dwell as a teen. He grew up Jewish. When he was 18 years old, Disick was arrested for driving while impaired and pleaded guilty to a noncriminal charge.

== Television career ==
In 2007, Disick began appearing on Keeping Up with the Kardashians alongside then-girlfriend Kourtney Kardashian. He has appeared on every season of the show. In the early seasons, he was well known for wearing suits.

He starred alongside Kourtney and Kim Kardashian in the spin-offs Kourtney and Kim Take Miami, where he received criticism due to a plot line in a March 2013 episode in which he hunted an alligator so that he could make a pair of shoes. Disick also starred on a 2011 episode of the short-lived CW series H8R, where he tried to convince a woman who had expressed her disgust of Disick on social media that he was likable.

From 2011 to 2012, Disick, Kourtney, and Kim starred in a second spin-off series, Kourtney and Kim Take New York. A second season plot line followed Disick as he developed a Japanese restaurant called Ryu in the Meatpacking District of New York City. Disick was involved in the design of the restaurant as well as the menu development, and he promoted the restaurant on several occasions, including an appearance at Macy's Fashion Night. The restaurant opened in 2012, and the opening was featured on an episode of Keeping Up with The Kardashians, but it received poor reviews and Disick backed out of the restaurant shortly after opening. The restaurant closed 191 days after opening.

In 2012, Disick purchased an online knighting ceremony on a trip to London. He had to buy a piece of land to be knighted. After, he began referring to himself as "Lord Disick". Also that year, Disick was a judge for the Miss Universe 2012 pageant alongside Lisa Vanderpump, Brad Goreski, and Masaharu Morimoto. He was also featured on an episode of Punk'd in which his car was towed and he had to barter to get it back.

In 2013, Disick had a web series called Lord Disick: Lifestyles of a Lord, which was a spin-off of Kourtney and Kim Take Miami. The series featured him showing off his car collection and wealthy lifestyle while providing viewers with tips on how to live lavishly. From 2014 to 2015, Disick starred alongside Kourtney and Khloe Kardashian in Kourtney and Khloe Take The Hamptons. The series followed the Kardashian sisters as they opened a pop-up store in the Hamptons and attended events such as the Baby Buggy Summer Dinner. Disick struggled with anxiety throughout the series because he grew up in Eastport, a town next to Southampton, and being in the area reminded him of his parents, who had recently died. While filming for Kourtney and Khloe Take The Hamptons, Disick and Khloe played themselves in an episode of the TV drama Royal Pains, which takes place in the Hamptons.

Disick made several guest appearances on reality shows in 2015 and 2016. He appeared on an August 2015 episode of Kingin' with Tyga, had a recurring role on I Am Cait, and appears on multiple episodes of Rob & Chyna, a 2016 episode of Wild 'n Out, and an episode of Kocktails with Khloe. He was considered as a possible contestant on Season 22 of Dancing with the Stars, but was turned down after he asked for $500,000.

Disick began developing properties in 2015. In 2019, he began starring on his own reality show, Flip It Like Disick, which follows his real estate and design business. The show follows Disick and his team, including Willa Ford, as they renovate luxury homes in the Greater Los Angeles area. Throughout the series, they remodel celebrity real estate in hour-long episodes.

== Business ventures ==
=== Nightclub appearances ===
Disick has made club appearances at 1OAK nightclub in Las Vegas, Harrah's in Atlantic City, and LEX Nightclub in Reno, sometimes receiving $80,000 for a single appearance. Disick has also appeared in clubs internationally in Canada and the United Kingdom, earning $250,000 for his UK appearances. The appearances were often arranged by Disick's manager at the time, David Weintraub. Eventually, the club appearances began to interfere with Disick's addiction struggles, and he stopped making appearances. Disick has also invested in his friends' nightlife businesses.

=== Talentless ===
In 2018, Disick began his own clothing line, Talentless. He named his clothing line as "a big F-you to everybody in the world that basically said that anybody that was in the reality business 10, 15 years ago didn't have talent." He discussed the development of his company on season eight of Keeping Up with the Kardashians. Talentless sells primarily casual clothing such as T-shirts, sweatshirts, and sweatpants. Three percent of every sale from the company goes to the non-profit organization Fuck Cancer. The company received backlash in March 2020 and was accused of being insensitive after releasing apparel that stated "Please Wash Your Hands" amid the coronavirus pandemic.

=== Partnerships and other ventures ===
In 2010, when asked if he had a career, Disick stated, "I make a lot of money, and I'm more than capable of supporting myself. I run multiple companies in the vitamin world: QuickTrim, Rejuvacare, Monte Carlo Perpetual Tan." In May 2011, Disick appeared on the cover of Men's Fitness. A March 2015 episode of Keeping Up with the Kardashians revealed that Disick was the president of Calabasas Luxury Cars, which is owned by his best friend and Flip It Like Disick costar, Benny Luciano.

Disick was featured in a June 17, 2013, marketing short film by Kanye West's creative content company Donda, in which Disick played Patrick Bateman from American Psycho. Disick is friends with rapper N.O.R.E., and is featured in a hip hop skit track on Student of the Game titled "Scot Disick Speaks", misspelling Disick's first name. In 2015, Disick guest-starred as "Jim" on two episodes of the online soap opera Youthful Daze.

Disick often posts sponsored ads on Instagram, and once accidentally posted the sponsor's instructions in the caption. It has been estimated that he makes around $15,000 per post. In December 2019, Disick and girlfriend Sofia Richie were criticized for promoting MDL Beast, a music festival in Saudi Arabia due to the country's human rights violations and treatment of women. In January 2020, Disick, Kris Jenner, and Khloe Kardashian were featured in several commercials for the video game Coin Master.

== Personal life ==
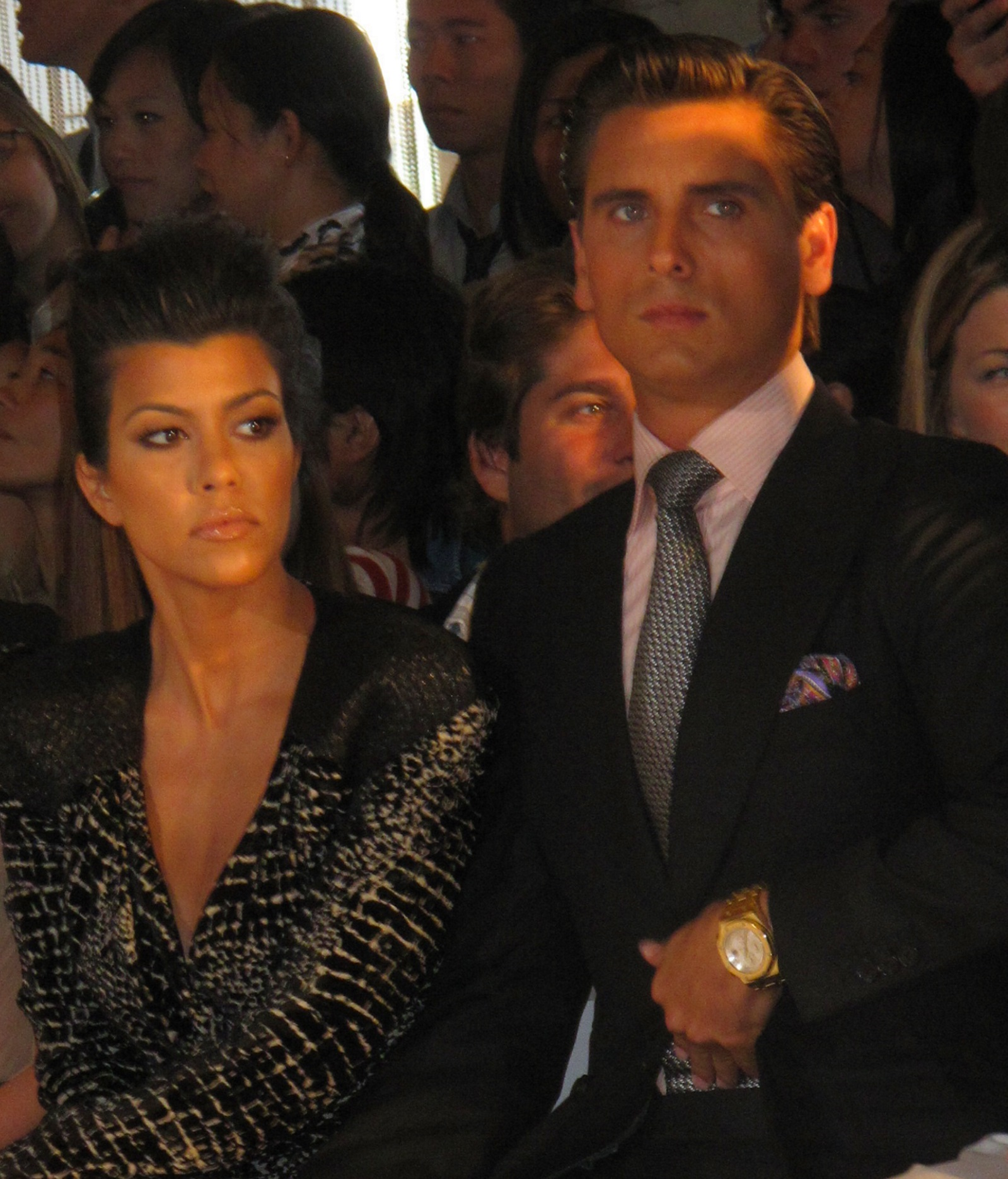
Disick and Kourtney Kardashian at Mercedes-Benz Fashion Week 2010

Disick dated Kourtney Kardashian from 2006 to 2015. They met at a house party in Mexico thrown by Joe Francis. Disick and Kardashian have three children: a son born December 14, 2009, a daughter born July 8, 2012, and a second son born December 14, 2014. Their relationship was on pause after Kardashian claimed Disick had an alcohol problem. After Disick temporarily gave up alcohol and attended therapy, Disick and Kardashian reconciled in mid-2010.

In 2011, during the season one finale of Kourtney and Kim Take New York, Disick purchased an engagement ring and planned to propose to Kardashian. However, when Disick asked her opinion on marriage, Kardashian responded that she did not want to change things when they were doing well, so Disick decided not to propose. Disick said in 2013, that they were happy and said "I feel like I used to want to get married more than she did, and then, being that she was always so not interested, I've decided not to be." The couple split in 2015, but have shared custody and co-parent their children. Scott remains close with Kardashian's family, and as of 2019 they considered him to be family.

His mother died in 2013, following a long illness. His father died three months later. Disick has had problems with alcohol and drug use. He was temporarily sober in 2011 and he claimed at the time, "I'm nicer now that I'm sober." In November 2014, Disick entered a rehabilitation facility in Connecticut following the filming of Kourtney and Khloé Take The Hamptons. In March 2015 he entered a rehabilitation facility in Guanacaste, Costa Rica, but checked himself out later that month. After breaking up with Kardashian, Disick entered another rehab facility in Florida. In 2016, he went to a rehab facility in Malibu and he said it helped him "restart" his life. In May 2020, Disick entered a treatment facility in Edwards, Colorado, after a relapse.

In 2015, Disick sold his Beverly Crest home to Russell Westbrook.

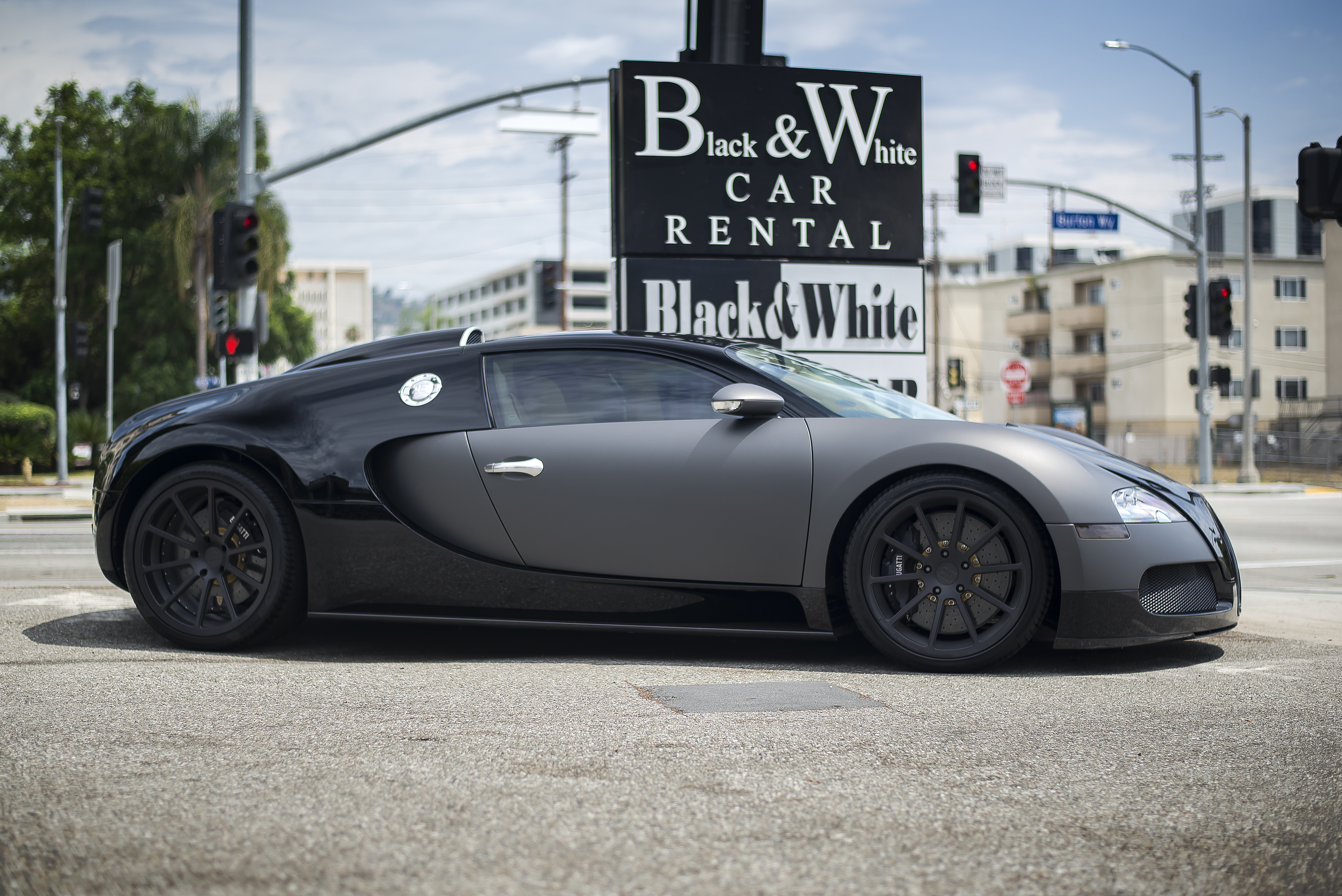
Disick's Bugatti Veyron

Disick is a car collector, and has owned at least twenty vehicles. He has owned a Rolls-Royce Drophead, a Maybach, several Ferraris, Range Rovers, and Bentleys. Several of his cars and his five-car garage were featured in an Architectural Digest video tour of Disick's home. His collection was also featured on an episode of his short-lived web series, Lord Disick: Lifestyles of a Lord. In addition to cars, Disick also collects watches, including Patek Phillipe and Rolex watches. During a May 2016 burglary, several watches were stolen from Disick's home.

In fall 2017, Disick and model Sofia Richie began dating. They confirmed their relationship in September 2017. Throughout their relationship, Disick and Richie often vacationed alongside Kardashian and their children. In 2019, they moved in together in Malibu, California. The couple broke up in August 2020. In 2018, Disick was involved in a lawsuit with Silver Airways for failing to pay more than $225,000 in jet fees.

He lives in Hidden Hills, California. His home was burglarized in both May 2016 and 2017, with officials believing the latter burglary was an inside job. He was not home during either burglary. His home has been featured on Flip It Like Disick and Architectural Digest. From February to September 2021, Disick was in a relationship with model Amelia Hamlin, the daughter of American actress and television personality Lisa Rinna and actor Harry Hamlin.

== Filmography ==
=== As television actor ===
Year	Title	Role	Notes	Ref.
2014	Royal Pains	Scott Disick	Guest star (1 episode)	
2014	Youthful Daze	Jim	Guest star (2 episodes)	

=== As himself on reality TV ===
Year	Title	Notes	Ref.
2007–2021	Keeping Up with the Kardashians	Main role (147 episodes)	
2009–2013	Kourtney and Kim Take Miami	Main role (22 episodes)	
2011–2012	Kourtney and Kim Take New York	Main role (17 episodes)	
2012	H8R	Guest star (1 episode)	
2012	Miss Universe 2012	Judge	
2014–2015	Kourtney and Khloé Take The Hamptons	Main role (10 episodes)	
2015	Kingin' with Tyga	Guest star (1 episode)	
2015–2016	I Am Cait	Recurring role (5 episodes)	
2016	Punk'd	Guest star (2 episodes)	
2016	Wild 'n Out	Guest star (1 episode)	
2016	Rob & Chyna	Recurring role (3 episodes)	
2016	Kocktails with Khloe	Guest star (1 episode)	
2019	Flip It Like Disick	Main role (8 episodes)	
2022–present	The Kardashians	Recurring cast	

=== As producer ===
Year	Title	Notes	Ref.
2019	Flip It Like Disick	Executive producer (8 episodes)	

=== In music videos ===
Year	Title	Artist	Ref.
2014	"Wake Up in It"	Mally Mall and Tyga feat. Sean Kingston, French Montana, and Pusha T	
2015	"Picture Me Rollin'"	Chris Brown	
