= Revenge Body with Khloé Kardashian =

American television series

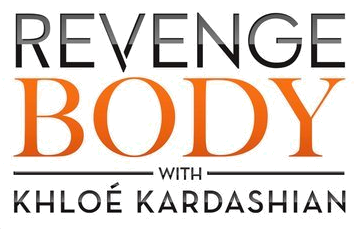
- Genre: Reality television
- Presented by: Khloé Kardashian
- Starring: Khloé Kardashian
- Country of origin: United States
- Original language: English
- No. of seasons: 3
- No. of episodes: 24

Production
- Executive producers: Eli Frankel; Khloé Kardashian; Ryan Seacrest
- Running time: 42 minutes
- Production companies: Rogue Atlas Productions; Lionsgate Television; KhloMoney Productions, Inc.; Ryan Seacrest Productions

Original release
- Network: E!
- Release: January 12, 2017 – August 25, 2019

Revenge Body with Khloé Kardashian is an American reality television series starring Khloé Kardashian that premiered on the E! cable network, on January 12, 2017. Announced on December 16, 2015, the series features two people in each episode who get a makeover using assistance of personal trainers and stylists leading to a "major transformation inside and out". A special preview episode aired on November 23, 2016. On April 18, 2017, E! renewed the show for a second season which premiered on January 7, 2018. On May 3, 2019, E! renewed the show for a third season, which premiered on July 7, 2019.

== Episodes ==
=== Series overview ===
Season	Episodes	Originally released	
Season	Episodes	First released	Last released
1	8	January 12, 2017	March 2, 2017
2	8	January 7, 2018	March 4, 2018
3	8	July 7, 2019	August 25, 2019

=== Season 1 (2017) ===
No. overall	No. in season	Title	Original release date	U.S. viewers (millions)
1	1	"Muscle Cub & The Duff"	January 12, 2017	0.63
2	2	"Softball Sweethearts & Former Footballer"	January 19, 2017	0.41
3	3	"Revenge-ance & Uber-entitled"	January 26, 2017	0.36
4	4	"The Former Addict & the Future Bride"	February 2, 2017	0.45
5	5	"Untying the Knot & Giraffically Sexy"	February 9, 2017	0.37
6	6	"The Lost Voice & Half-Baked"	February 16, 2017	0.37
7	7	"From Mom to MILF"	February 23, 2017	0.38
8	8	"Typecast & Camera Shy"	March 2, 2017	0.32

=== Season 2 (2018) ===
No. overall	No. in season	Title	Original release date	U.S. viewers (millions)
9	1	"Web of Lies & Mommy Issues"	January 7, 2018	N/A
10	2	"Invisible Girl & Living a Lie"	January 14, 2018	N/A
11	3	"Model, Interrupted & The Basic Bitch"	January 15, 2018	N/A
12	4	"Lost Identity & Never Been Kissed"	January 21, 2018	N/A
13	5	"Binge Eating Bachelorette & Drill Sergeant"	February 11, 2018	0.32
14	6	"Eye of the Tiger & The Other Woman"	February 18, 2018	N/A
15	7	"The Excuse Queen & The Pop Star"	February 25, 2018	N/A
16	8	"The Odd Couple & the Ex Factor"	March 4, 2018	N/A

=== Season 3 (2019) ===
No. overall	No. in season	Title	Original release date	U.S. viewers (millions)
17	1	"Love Me, for Me"	July 7, 2019	0.23
18	2	"The Twins & the Bullied Brother"	July 14, 2019	0.23
19	3	"Becoming Amy & From Scrawny to Brawny"	July 21, 2019	N/A
20	4	"Hungry for Love and the Fighter"	July 28, 2019	N/A
21	5	"The Widow and the Hollywood Executive"	August 4, 2019	N/A
22	6	"The Emotional Eater and the Dancer"	August 11, 2019	N/A
23	7	"The Single Mom and the Disappointing Daughter"	August 18, 2019	N/A
24	8	"The Mother/Daughter Duo and the Sugar Addict"	August 25, 2019	N/A

== Broadcast ==
Internationally, the series debuted in Australia, Europe and Asia in simulcast with the American premiere on January 13, 2017. It was broadcast in Australia on E! (FOXTEL).

== See also ==
- Kocktails with Khloé
