= Strong Looks Better Naked =

2015 book by Khloe Kardashian

- Author: Khloe Kardashian
- Language: English
- Genre: Memoir
- Publisher: Regan Arts
- Publication date: November 2015
- Publication place: United States
- Pages: 256
- ISBN: 978-1682450604

Strong Looks Better Naked is a 2015 book by Khloe Kardashian. The book is a memoir about Kardashian's weight loss and also contains fitness and nutrition advice, as well as numerous photos of Kardashian. It appeared on The New York Times Best seller list.

== Synopsis ==
The book is divided into three sections: Body, Mind, and Soul. The Body section primarily describers Kardashian's workout routine, diet plan, and fitness advice. The book also contains many photos of Kardashian.

Kardashian also discusses her personal life and relationships in the book, including dealing with the death of father Robert Kardashian, her marriage to Lamar Odom, and her relationship with Caitlyn Jenner.

== Reception ==
Clover Hope of Jezebel called it a "book about nothing." Hope also remarked "Beneath the fitness fanaticism, there's potential for depth that's only mildly explored, creating a watered-down version of the Khloé we know."
