= Wrath of Caine =

Mixtape by Pusha T
- Released: January 28, 2013
- Recorded: 2012–2013
- Genre: Hip-hop
- Length: 36:16
- Labels: Re-Up; GOOD
- Producers: Pusha T (exec.); Dready; John "$K" McGee; Arthur McArthur; Boogz N Tapez; Bink; !llmind; Jake One; The Neptunes; Harry Fraud; Mike Dean; Travi$ Scott; The Renegades; Young Chop; Rico Beats; Kanye West; Southside; TM88

Pusha T chronology
Fear of God II: Let Us Pray (2011)	Wrath of Caine (2013)	My Name Is My Name (2013)

Singles from Wrath of Caine
- 1. "Blocka" Released: December 5, 2012; 2. "Millions" Released: January 29, 2013

Wrath of Caine is the second mixtape by American rapper Pusha T, released on January 28, 2013 under GOOD Music and Re-Up Records. The mixtape features guest appearances from Rick Ross, French Montana, Popcaan, Travis Scott, Troy Ave, Kevin Gates, Andrea Martin and Wale. Production varies from Kanye West, Young Chop, Jake One and The Neptunes, among others.

Wrath of Caine was released via mixtape distribution site LiveMixtapes and was also made available for free digital download on DatPiff, accumulating 75,000 after its unveiling. The eleven-track mixtape was highly anticipated since it was announced. It served as promotion leading up to the release of Pusha T's debut studio album My Name Is My Name (2013).

== Background ==
On November 11, 2012, Pusha T announced he would be releasing a mixtape titled "Wrath of Caine". The mixtape was originally expected to have been released at the end of 2012. On January 15, 2013, the cover art for "Wrath of Caine" was released. On January 17, 2013, the trailer for "Wrath of Caine" was released. On January 24, 2013, during an interview with Miss Info the Clipse member said Wrath of Caine is a collection of lyrically-driven street anthems, comparable to the music he recorded with his brother and Clipse cohort No Malice, saying:

"Wrath of Caine is basically just me catering to my core. It's all about just street Hip Hop, street music. It's just something that I like to do. It's something that I feel like has no boundaries, no parameters. I can do what I really, really want to do…[my approach to the mixtape is] not about more of a creative [decision], I just think it's about more of what I want to hear for myself and what my fans want to hear. They want to hear lyrics, they want to hear street [music]…it's just the whole street life perspective."

On January 27, 2013, during an interview with Miss Info, Pusha T discussed "Millions" featuring Rick Ross, track 2 off Wrath of Caine which was released prior to the mixtape, saying: "It's basically an ode to dope boys and stash spots; it's just an ode to that energy [...] I'm trying to make music and recreate that energy that I feel was missing in Hip Hop, [the energy] like you roll down your windows, you hop in your car and you front until you pull up to the club. Right now, that energy is sort of missing to me, and I feel like 'Millions' is a prime example of what that is."

== Release and promotion ==
On December 5, 2012, the first song was released in promotion of the mixtape titled "Blocka" featuring Travis Scott and Popcaan. On December 11, 2012, the music video for "Blocka" featuring Travis Scott and Popcaan was released. On January 20, 2013, the music video was shot for "Millions" featuring Rick Ross and it was released on February 10, 2013. On January 29, 2013, "Millions" was released as the second single from the mixtape. On January 31, 2013, the music video was shot for "Doesn't Matter" featuring French Montana and it was released on February 18, 2013. On March 15, 2013, Pusha T released the trailer for the music video for "Trust You" which features Kevin Gates and the music video was released on April 1, 2013.

== Critical reception ==
Professional ratings
Review scores
Source	Rating
BET	4/5 stars
Consequence of Sound	3/5 stars
Pitchfork	7.2/10
PopMatters	(7/10)
XXL	(XL)

Wrath of Caine was met with generally favorable reviews from music critics. Omar Burgess of HipHopDX said "Pusha is essentially on cruise control for the duration of his freebie prelude to My Name Is My Name. None of this is to say that Wrath of Caine isn’t worth the five minutes it should take to download and play or stream it on the device of your choice. Even when most of his focus is likely on his upcoming Def Jam long player, Pusha T can show off, be humble, recount his rock chopping days and actually rap with the best of them. And in a bleak, boring first quarter, that’s more than a lot of people are offering". Ralph Bristout of XXL gave the mixtape an XL rating, saying "Clocking at a little over half an hour, Wrath Of Caine, although a quick fix, serves as an overall potent listen. Mike Madden of Consequence of Sound gave the mixtape three out of five stars, saying "Though not quite a Rich Forever or even a 4eva N a Day, the 36-minute Wrath of Caine typically sounds like the work of one of rap’s most exciting voices – exactly what it is.

Craig Jenkins of Pitchfork gave the mixtape a 7.2 out of ten, saying "Wrath of Caine’s guests neither add to nor subtract from the proceedings, and where he can, Pusha wisely relegates them to hook duty. After Fear of God’s withering batch of middling freestyles and rangy originals and Fear of God II’s pervasive sense that the artist with top billing was a guest on his own album, Wrath of Caine is really the first hint of what Pusha-T is capable of as a solo artist. He’s not really relatable anymore, and hard times are distant memories rather than palpable realities, but he’s still got sharp wit and snarling lyrical intensity to fall back on, and Wrath of Caine thrives off of that gritty elan."

On December 23, 2013, XXL named it the seventh best mixtape of 2013. They commented saying, "Pusha T’s Wrath of Caine serves as a prelude to his debut solo album, My Name Is My Name, quite beautifully. The dope rap master displays his vernacular and lyrical ability by constructing addictive street records. It’s a short tape but very easily a great listen that serves as a fix to Pusha’s fans."

== Track listing ==
No.	Title	Producer(s)	Length
1.	"Intro"	Dready	1:57
2.	"Millions" (featuring Rick Ross)	Southside; TM88; Kanye West^{[a]}; Mike Dean^{[a]}; Rico Beats^{[a]}	5:06
3.	"Doesn't Matter" (featuring French Montana)	The Renegades	3:54
4.	"Blocka" (featuring Popcaan and Travis Scott)	Young Chop; Dean; Travi$ Scott^{[a]}	3:34
5.	"Road Runner" (featuring Troy Ave)	Harry Fraud	3:03
6.	"Revolution"	The Neptunes	1:42
7.	"Only You Can Tell It" (featuring Wale)	Boogz N Tapez	4:10
8.	"Trust You" (featuring Kevin Gates)	John "$K" McGee; Arthur McArthur	4:34
9.	"Take My Life" (featuring Andrea Martin)	Jake One	3:07
10.	"Re-Up Gang Motivation" (performed by Ab-Liva)	!llmind	1:41
11.	"I Am Forgiven"	B!nk	3:28
Total length:			36:16

Notes

- ^{^[a]} signifies a co-producer
- "Blocka" features uncredited vocals by Travis Scott and Popcaan.

== Personnel ==
- Ab-Liva – executive producer, lead artist (track 10)
- Paul Bailey – recording
- B!nk – production (track 11)
- Boogz N Tapes – production (track 7)
- Dready – production (track 1)
- Harry Fraud – production (track 5)
- French Montana – featured artist (track 3)
- Kevin Gates – featured artist (track 8)
- !llmind – production (track 10)
- Jake One – production (track 9)
- Kim Lee – interludes
- Fabian Marasciullo – mixing
- Andrea Martin – featured artist (track 9)
- Arthur McArthur – production (track 8)
- The Neptunes – production (track 6)
- Popcaan – vocals (track 4)
- Joe Perez – art work
- Pusha T – lead artist, executive producer
- The Renegades – production (track 3)
- Rick Ross – featured artist (track 2)
- Southside – production (track 2)
- Steven Victor – A&R, management
- John "$K" McGee – production (track 8)
- Travis Scott – vocals (track 4)
- Troy Ave – featured artist (track 5)
- Wale – featured artist (track 7)
- Kanye West – co-production (track 2)
- Young Chop – production (track 4)
