= Kingin' with Tyga =

American reality television series

- Genre: Reality television
- Starring: Tyga
- Country of origin: United States
- Original language: English
- No. of seasons: 2
- No. of episodes: 12

Production
- Executive producers: Tyga; Anthony Martin; Marcus Fox; Todd Nelson; J.D. Roth; Brant Pinvidic; Adam Kaloustian; Elena Diaz; Karen Frank; Darin Byrne; Paul Ricci; Chris McCarthy
- Camera setup: Multiple
- Running time: 22 minutes
- Production company: 3 Ball Entertainment

Original release
- Network: MTV2; MTV
- Release: July 24, 2015 – September 8, 2016

Kingin' with Tyga is an American reality television series that premiered on July 24, 2015, on MTV2. The show was announced on April 14, 2015. The six episode, half-hour series follows the life of rapper Tyga as he works on his music career and chronicles his luxurious lifestyle. The show returned with a second season which premiered August 4, 2016 on MTV.

== Episodes ==
=== Series overview ===
Season	Episodes	Originally released	
Season	Episodes	First released	Last released
1	6	August 17, 2015	September 14, 2015
2	6	August 4, 2016	September 8, 2016

=== Season 1 (2015) ===
No. overall	No. in season	Title	Original release date	US viewers (millions)
1	1	"Introducing the King"	July 24, 2015	0.16
2	2	"The Challenge"	July 31, 2015	0.22
3	3	"King Kingin'"	August 7, 2015	0.21
4	4	"Scrap Gold"	August 14, 2015	0.15
5	5	"Making Changes"	August 21, 2015	0.17
6	6	"The Life"	August 28, 2015	0.10

=== Season 2 (2016) ===
No. overall	No. in season	Title	Original release date	US viewers (millions)
7	1	"International Kingin'"	August 4, 2016	0.47
8	2	"King of Pranks"	August 11, 2016	0.33
9	3	"Cash is King"	August 18, 2016	0.30
10	4	"Playground fit for a Mini-King"	August 25, 2016	0.36
11	5	"Last Kings Burger"	September 1, 2016	0.31
12	6	"King of Dubai"	September 8, 2016	0.23
