= Sweet Serenade =

Single by Pusha T featuring Chris Brown

from the album My Name Is My Name
- Released: September 4, 2013
- Recorded: 2013
- Genre: Hip hop
- Length: 3:40
- Label: GOOD Music; Def Jam
- Songwriters: Terrence Thornton; Chris Brown; Kanye West; Kasseem Dean
- Producers: Swizz Beatz; Kanye West; (add.)

Pusha T singles chronology
"Numbers on the Boards" (2013)	"Sweet Serenade" (2013)	"I'll Be Gone (Vice Remix)" (2013)

Chris Brown singles chronology
"Love More" (2013)	"Sweet Serenade" (2013)	"Show Me" (2013)

"Sweet Serenade" is a song by American hip hop recording artist Pusha T from his debut studio album My Name Is My Name (2013). "Sweet Serenade" features vocals from American singer Chris Brown, with production by Swizz Beatz and Kanye West. On September 4, 2013, the song was released to iTunes as the album's third official single by GOOD Music and Def Jam Recordings. The song peaked at number 19 on the US Billboard Bubbling Under Hot 100 Singles chart.

== Background ==
On August 28, 2013, Pusha T premiered the audio to "Sweet Serenade" featuring singer Chris Brown. It would be the fourth song from the album revealed, after the first three singles "Pain", "Numbers on the Board" and "Who I Am" featuring Big Sean and 2 Chainz. Shortly after during a Twitter Q&A he revealed the song was produced by Swizz Beatz. It would then be released for retail digital download on September 4, 2013.

== Music and lyrics ==
The song's production features a lowdown minimal thump and restrained orchestral beat. Throughout the song Pusha T shares his thoughts on his career arc, as well as on the state of the rap game. The song also features a chorus sung by American R&B singer Chris Brown. Overall the song conjures up incongruous imagery over the mildly eerie production, driven by choral vocals and slow-rolling percussion. Pusha T explained the track saying, ""Sweet Serenade" is the long exhale after making it past a street life with serious consequences. It's basically celebrating the fact that we've made it this far. We've been through so much, me and my friends. We've been around some of the worst things, the worst environments, we've lived through some really harsh times and we're still here and we're celebrating that."

== Critical reception ==
"Sweet Serenade" was met with generally positive reviews from music critics. Jake Jenkins of AbsolutePunk said, "Sweet Serenade" has the unfortunate inclusion of a Chris Brown hook, but its by the books, inoffensive, and a lot more desirable than Swizz Beats deciding to take his production credit a step further and gracing the track with one of his infamous shouting hooks. The spotlight here is all on Pusha T though, and his verses are strong enough to make you forget that this song even has a hook. David Jeffries of AllMusic called the song, "aptly titled" but still edgy. Craig Jenkins of Pitchfork Media stated, "disembodied, wraithlike Chris Brown’s good life platitudes on “Sweet Serenade” are waylaid by at every turn by gun-toting mogul talk."

== Music video ==
The music video for "Sweet Serenade" was shot on September 23, 2013, in Playa del Rey, California and directed by Colin Tilley. The video was shot on a beach during the night. On September 25, a behind-the-scenes video was released. The music video was released on October 7, 2013.

On October 17, 2013, a video was released featuring Pusha T performing the song in the studio with DJ Kay Slay.

== Remix ==
On December 18, 2013, The LOX (Styles P, Jadakiss & Sheek Louch) released a remix to "Sweet Serenade" along with the Kendrick Lamar assisted "Nostalgia".

== Charts ==
Chart (2013)	Peak position
US Bubbling Under Hot 100 (Billboard)	19
US Hot R&B/Hip-Hop Songs (Billboard)	44

== Release history ==
Region	Date	Format	Label
United States	September 4, 2013	Digital download	GOOD Music, Def Jam
