= My Name Is My Name =

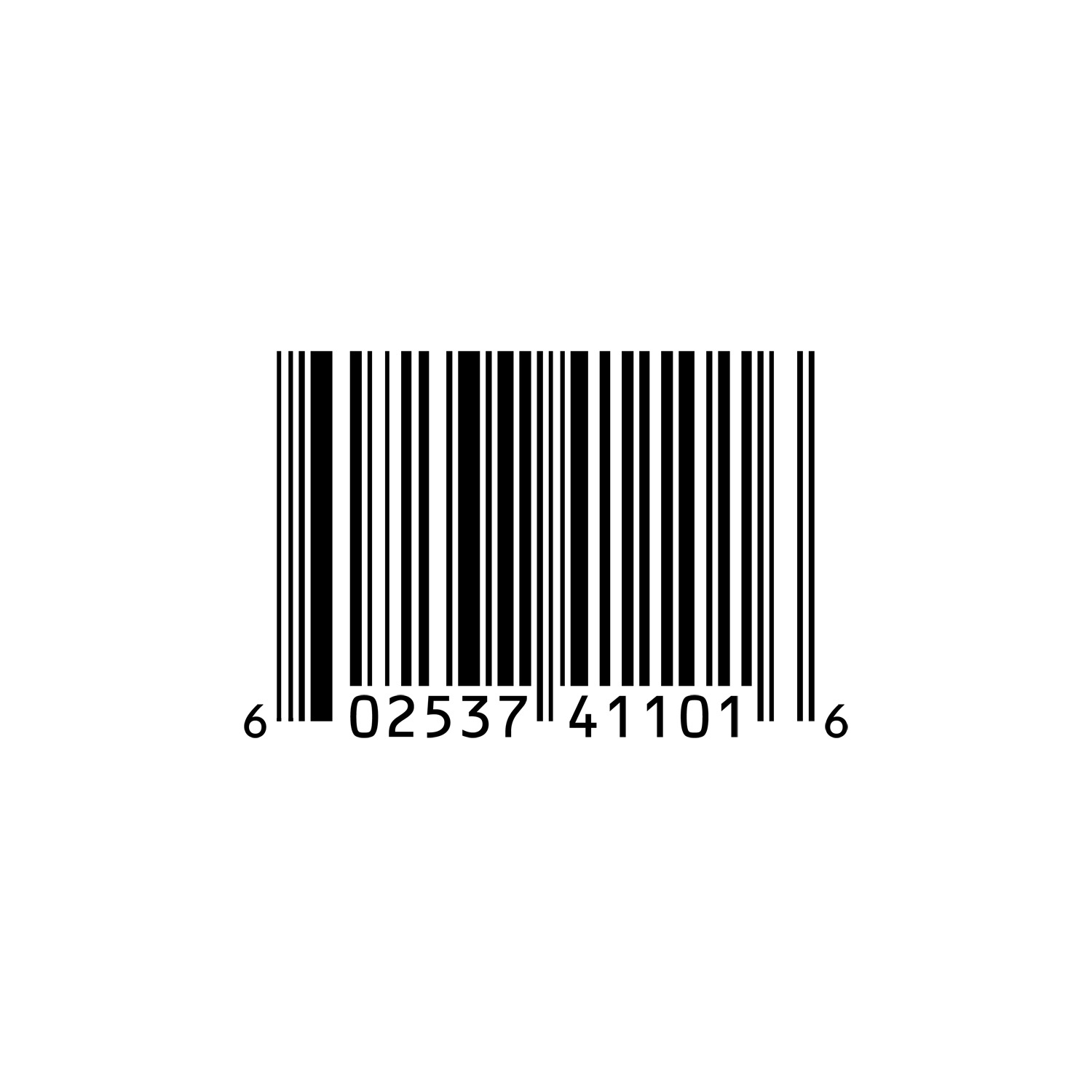

Studio album by Pusha T
- Released: October 8, 2013
- Recorded: 2011–2013
- Studios: Circle House (North Miami); Deuce Station (Atlanta); Easy Love (Atlanta); Means Street (Atlanta); Silent Sound (Atlanta); Island Sound (Hawaii); Jungle City (New York City); Stratosphere (New York City); Setai (Miami Beach); The Spot (Los Angeles); Studios de la Seine (Paris); Thomas Crown (Virginia Beach)
- Genre: Hip-hop
- Length: 46:25
- Labels: GOOD; Def Jam
- Producers: Don Cannon; The-Dream; Hudson Mohawke; Kanye West; Mano; Nottz; Pharrell Williams; Rico Beats; Sebastian Sartor; Swizz Beatz

Pusha T chronology
Wrath of Caine (2013)	My Name Is My Name (2013)	King Push – Darkest Before Dawn: The Prelude (2015)

Clean version cover

Singles from My Name Is My Name
- 1. "Pain" Released: October 9, 2012; 2. "Numbers on the Boards" Released: May 10, 2013; 3. "Sweet Serenade" Released: September 4, 2013; 4. "Let Me Love You" Released: November 12, 2013; 5. "Nosetalgia" Released: February 3, 2014

My Name Is My Name is the debut studio album by American rapper Pusha T. It was released on October 8, 2013, by GOOD Music and Def Jam Recordings. While leading up to the album's announcement, Pusha T released the mixtape Fear of God and the EP Fear of God II: Let Us Pray during 2011, along with collaborating on the GOOD Music's compilation album Cruel Summer (released in 2012). In 2013, he also released another mixtape Wrath of Caine. The album's production was handled primarily by Kanye West, along with several producers, including Pharrell Williams, The-Dream, Hudson Mohawke, Sebastian Sartor, Don Cannon, Swizz Beatz, Rico Beats, Mano and Nottz. It also features guest appearances from Rick Ross, Jeezy, 2 Chainz, Big Sean, Future, Pharrell Williams, Chris Brown and Kendrick Lamar, among others.

The album received widespread acclaim from critics and was positioned highly on many "Best Albums of 2013" lists by major publications. The album also fared well commercially debuting at number four on the US Billboard 200, selling 74,000 copies in its first week of release. The album was promoted by five singles: "Pain", "Numbers on the Boards", "Sweet Serenade", "Let Me Love You", and "Nosetalgia", along with the promotional single "Who I Am".

== Background ==
After establishing his solo career, while signing a deal to GOOD Music in September 2010, Pusha T released his first solo project, a mixtape, titled Fear of God (2011). Following the release of his mixtape, he released his first extended play, a sequel to the mixtape, titled Fear of God II: Let Us Pray (2011). After the release of his EP, Pusha T started working on his debut album, and at the time it had included production from Kanye West, The Neptunes, Bangladesh, Ryan Leslie and Alex da Kid. After continued to working on his first full-length album, which was originally set to be released in 2012, it was pushed back due to his participation in GOOD Music's first compilation album Cruel Summer (2012).

In July 2012, Pusha T told MTV that while he was putting together his solo album, he was heavily influenced by Keanu Reeves and Al Pacino's 1997 film The Devil's Advocate. "This album was based off [sic] the movie 'Devil's Advocate'. Not theme-wise at all, but just in the feel of the album. 'Devil's Advocate' is a very dark movie, but at the same time, visually, it's beautiful. The album is based off of [sic] that because I speak about the harsh realities of street life but there's a lot of glitz and glamour that comes along with that. If you just look at it at face value, you might think, 'It sounds a bit like he's glorifying [street life]', but when you get tuned into the record, you realize that you get both sides of it."

In 2012, in an interview, Pusha T spoke on the inspiration behind the album title. "Basically, I tried to pick a title that embodied who I am as an artist. I wanted people to understand like Pusha is everything that I really, really am. Actually, there is a line in 'Pain' where I say "My name is my name," that line comes from Marlo Stanfield from the series The Wire. It was one of the more prominent catch phrases that he said at the end of that series. He was basically saying, I am who I am, I stand on my name I live this. I really felt that embodied my presence in the rap game." Pusha T announced the new title of his album in November 2012, along with Spin reporting that his album had been pushed back until 2013. On March 19, 2013 Pusha T said that the album would include 13 songs and that he had already finished 11 of those songs.

== Recording and production ==
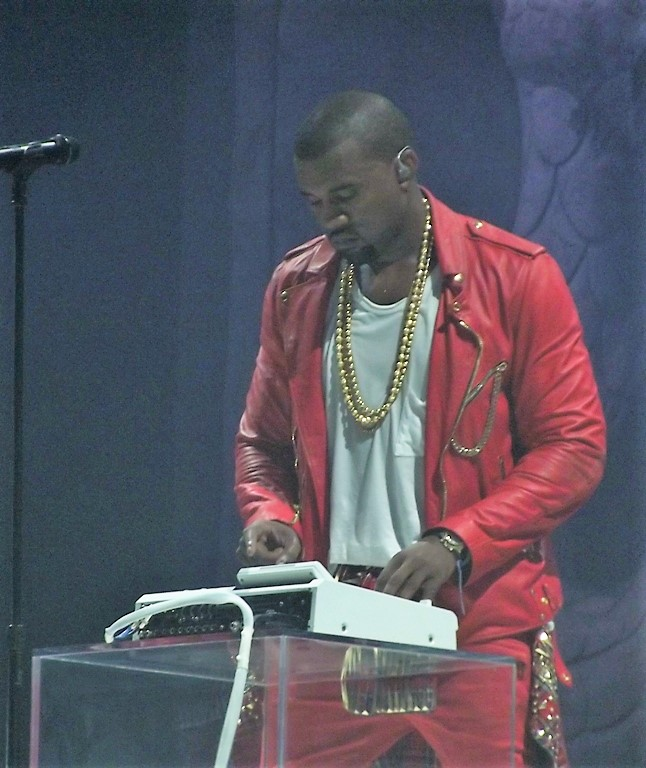
GOOD Music founder Kanye West provided the majority of the production on the album.

On April 13, 2013, at the 2013's Coachella Valley Music and Arts Festival, Pusha T announced that he would be going to Paris later that week, just to put some final touches on the album, afterwards he would announce a release date. In June 2013, Pusha T had been set to turn in the album to Def Jam for mastering, however, Kanye West presented Pusha with some additional beats. This resulted in Pusha going back to the studio to continue the recording. In early stages in the recording process, he began working on the album with Kanye West, Symbolyc One, The Neptunes, Bangladesh, and Ryan Leslie. Since then, he has confirmed that he was working with The-Dream, Just Blaze, No I.D., Nottz, Don Cannon, Nashiem Myrick, Carlos Brody (of The Hitmen), DJ Mano, Swizz Beatz, Rico Beats, Travis Scott, Hudson Mohawke, Young Chop, and Sham, amongst others on the album's production. On August 4, 2013 he announced that the song he wanted to be the album's intro was produced by Joaquin Phoenix. On August 22, 2013, Pusha T appeared on MTV's RapFix and told Sway Calloway that the bulk of the album's production would be handled by Kanye West, while confirming production by Pharrell, Swizz Beatz, The-Dream, Nottz, and Don Cannon to be featured on the album.

Leading up to its release Pusha T announced that the album's guest appearances would include Rick Ross, Kanye West, The-Dream, Future, Jeezy, 2 Chainz, Big Sean, Chris Brown, Kendrick Lamar, and the Re-Up Gang. He also said he was looking to get a couple more cleared up. In early January, Pusha stated that fellow Clipse member No Malice could appear on the album, however, in July, he confirmed that Malice would not be featured. He also said his dream collaboration for the album would be with Jay-Z. In an August 22, 2013, appearance on MTV's RapFix he confirmed that additional guest appearances, that had yet to be revealed would come from Ab-Liva, Kelly Rowland, and Pharrell.

== Release and promotion ==
While performing in Vancouver, British Columbia, it was reported that Pusha T announced that he would be releasing, for promotional purposes, a mixtape, titled Wrath of Caine by the end of 2012. However, it would have to be pushed back to 2013. Pusha T described the tape as street-oriented music intended for his longtime fans.

"Wrath of Caine is basically just me catering to my core. It's all about just street Hip Hop, street music" he said. "It's just something that I like to do. It's something that I feel like has no boundaries, no parameters. I can do what I really, really want to do...[my approach to the mixtape is] not about more of a creative [decision], I just think it's about more of what I want to hear for myself and what my fans want to hear. They want to hear lyrics, they want to hear street [music]...it's just the whole street life perspective."

On December 5, 2012, the first song released from the mixtape, "Blocka", which features guest vocals by Popcaan and GOOD Music's Travis Scott. The reggae-inspired track was produced by Young Chop. The music video was released on December 10, 2012. The second song was, "Millions", which features guest vocals from fellow rapper Rick Ross. The mixtape cover was revealed on January 15, 2013. The mixtape was released for free download on January 28, 2013. The mixtape also features guest appearances from French Montana, Wale, Kevin Gates, Troy Ave and Andrea Martin, also it included the production from Kanye West, Young Chop, Harry Fraud, The Neptunes, Jake One, Illmind and Bink, among others.

The album was included on multiple "Most Anticipated Albums of 2013" lists including eighth by Complex and ninth by XXL. In January 2013, Pusha T announced that his album will be releasing at the end of quarter one of 2013. During the red carpet for the 55th Grammy Awards, Pusha T announced that his album would have to be pushed back till May 2013. On April 29, Pusha T announced through his Twitter page that the album would be released on July 16, 2013. In July 2013, he confirmed that the album would be pushed back, and then on August 22, he confirmed that the album would be released on October 8, 2013.

On August 30, 2013, Kanye West unveiled the simplistic standard and deluxe edition album covers via his Twitter account. On September 21, 2013, Pusha T released snippets for the standard edition tracks. On September 27, 2013, Pusha T released the music video for the intro track "King Push". On October 2, 2013, after a few days of being credited as a co-producer of "King Push", Joaquin Phoenix denied having assist in producing the song. He said, "While it was widely reported that Pusha T used my beat and that I produced his song, I can't take any credit. A friend's son played me his music, and all I did was make an introduction to Kanye's camp." On October 3, 2013, during an interview with Rap-Up, Pusha T revealed that it was actually the son of Metallica drummer Lars Ulrich who produced the song, saying "Joaquin Phoenix gave the beat to 'Ye, so when I got the beat from 'Ye, it was, Yo, Joaquin gave me this beat. So me, I'm just like, OK, I know Joaquin's into music and you know the whole thing, so I'm like, Oh, damn. I believe it is the son of Lars Ulrich from Metallica. I hope I'm not wrong this time. It was mistaken because it came from Joaquin." On October 1, 2013, the album was released for free streaming via Myspace.

Starting April 24, 2013, Pusha T and fellow Def Jam rapper Fabolous begun the Life is So Exciting Tour in Providence, Rhode Island. The tour features 28 shows and ended on June 1, 2013. The tour was in promotion of My Name Is My Name and Fabolous' sixth studio album Loso's Way 2: Rise to Power. On December 9, 2013, it was revealed that Pusha T would be co-headlining the 2 Good 2 Be T.R.U. Tour with 2 Chainz, a North American tour to begin on February 4, 2014, in Boston, Massachusetts and end on March 24, 2014, in Washington, D.C. The tour will also feature August Alsina and Cap.1 as opening acts.

== Singles ==
On October 9, 2012, Pusha T released "Pain" featuring Future, as the first single from the album. On October 10, 2013, the music video was released for "Pain" featuring Future. The first promotional single released from the album would be "Millions" which features Rick Ross. The song originally appeared on his mixtape Wrath of Caine, however Pusha also released the song for retail sale on January 29, 2013. The music video for "Millions" was released on February 10, 2013. At the 55th Grammy Awards he announced the song would be featured on his album. On March 8, 2013, in an interview with DJ Semtex, Pusha T said that "Millions" would not be featured on the album after all. Moreover, Pusha T confirmed a further collaboration with Rick Ross.

On April 29, 2013 Rolling Stone gave his following single "Numbers on the Boards" four out of five stars, stating "The star is Kanye West's beat, a contusive bass blur with percussion that's like bamboo sticks on a busted radiator. The result is near-perfect no-bullshit hip-hop." On May 9, 2013, the music video was released for "Numbers on the Boards" which featured cameo appearances from Kanye West and Chief Keef. The video was shot in Paris. The Kanye West and Don Cannon-produced song was then released as the album's second single the following day.

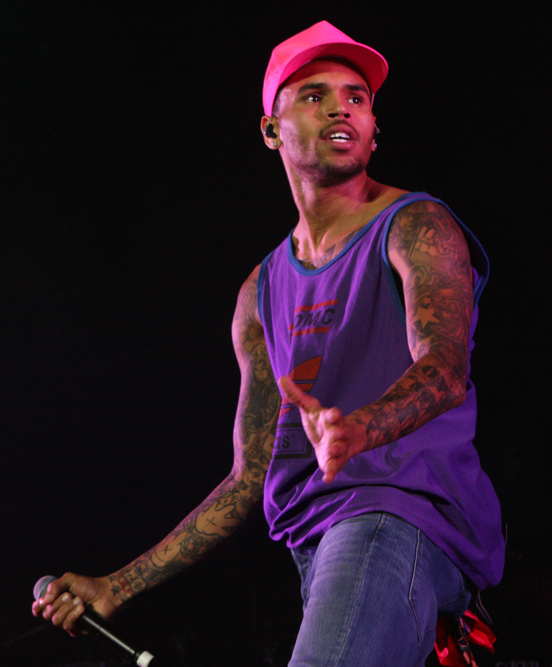
Singer Chris Brown made an appearance on the album's third single "Sweet Serenade".

In March 2013, during an interview Hot 107.9, he announced that his next single is "Who I Am" featuring Kanye West. On June 11, Pusha T announced that "Who I Am" would be released in two days on June 13, 2013. The final version of the single featured 2 Chainz and Big Sean, however Kanye West still provided the production of the track. However, the song did not end up receiving an official retail release, instead becoming the album's second promotional single.

On August 30, 2013, Pusha T premiered the audio to the album's third single, "Sweet Serenade" featuring Chris Brown. After during a Twitter Q&A, he would reveal the song was produced by Swizz Beatz. It would then be released for retail digital download on September 4, 2013. The music video was released for "Sweet Serenade" on October 7, 2013.

On September 16, 2013, Def Jam released the single artwork, and announced that "Nosetalgia" featuring Kendrick Lamar would be released soon. Later that same day the song would be premiered via Def Jam's website. The song produced by Nottz, features both artists rapping about their experiences and effects of cocaine on their childhoods. On the following day, it has been released to the DJs, as the album's third promotional single, and then be released for pre-order with the album on iTunes. On October 3, 2013, the music video was released for "Nosetalgia" featuring Kendrick Lamar. "Nosetalgia" was officially released as a single in the United Kingdom on February 3, 2014, serving as the fifth overall single from the album.

"Let Me Love You" features guest vocals by Kelly Rowland, impacted urban contemporary radio on November 12, 2013, as the album's fourth single.

=== Other songs ===
On the following day, the music video for the Rick Ross featuring "Hold On" was released. On January 17, 2014, the music video was released for "Suicide" featuring Ab-Liva.

== Critical reception ==
My Name Is My Name ratings
Aggregate scores
Source	Rating
AnyDecentMusic?	7.6/10
Metacritic	81/100
Review scores
Source	Rating
AllMusic	4.5/5 stars
Entertainment Weekly	A−
The Guardian	4/5 stars
Los Angeles Times	3/4 stars
NME	8/10
Pitchfork	8.0/10
Rolling Stone	3/5 stars
Spin	7/10
Uncut	8/10
Vice	A−

My Name Is My Name was met with widespread critical acclaim. At Metacritic, which assigns a normalized rating out of 100 to reviews from professional publications, the album received an average score of 81, based on 27 reviews. Aggregator AnyDecentMusic? gave it 7.6 out of 10, based on their assessment of the critical consensus.

Mike Powell of Rolling Stone stated, "He's still a witty, quietly vicious rapper, capable of tearing apart spare street tracks like "Nosetalgia" and "Numbers on the Board" while barely raising his voice. But set in the more commercial contexts of Kelly Rowland features and the-Dream's fluorescent R&B, he can sound like a fish out of some pretty expensive water. Who Pusha was is gone, but who he is still sometimes unclear." David Jeffries of AllMusic said, "With Pusha's pen at full force and his performance a proper combination of cold and tense, the album is as if Clipse's Hell Hath No Fury were atom-smashed into something more artful and unstable. My Name Is My Name is a remarkable and vital solo debut." Jesse Cataldo, writing for Slant Magazine, said, "Yet despite its pedigree, the album puts too much overall emphasis on guest spots and not enough on establishing a distinctive identity for the rapper. Full of retrograde lyrical conceits, seemingly at odds with its futuristic backdrops, My Name Is My Name is a reminder that Pusha T hasn't changed, and his stubborn reliance on maintaining his brand is probably not the wisest strategy in today's shifting hip-hop climate." Jon Hadusek of Consequence stated, "A few poor production choices and uneven sequencing do slow the album, but it shows flashes of real brilliance. The best tracks here are produced by Kanye and Pharrell, and they're concentrated at the beginning and end. The smattering in the middle of the tracklist is handled by host of collaborators, not all of them effectively complimenting Pusha's rawness. While not the defining statement it could've been, My Name Is My Name shows different sides of Pusha T as he becomes a more multidimensional rapper."

Jabbari Weekes of Exclaim! said, "A majority of My Name Is My Name's sounds are wrapped in minimalistic saran wrap that allows Pusha T's cold delivery to flourish, with more abstract drug references than a paranoid dealer over a tapped phone line." Reed Jackson, writing for XXL, stated, "Certain songs, like the trap house anthem "No Regrets" or the early-2000s-sounding "Let Me Love You", are entertaining, but don't have the inventiveness or excitement of the album's other tracks. With MNIMN standing at a lean 12 songs, these missteps are hard to gloss over. Regardless, Pusha T accomplishes a lot here, crafting a record that is big in concept but is still rooted in the longstanding hip-hop tradition that lyricism is king." Brandon Soderberg of Spin said, "Don't tell King Push, but My Name Is My Name bears a weird resemblance to Drake's Nothing Was the Same: Here is another deeply considered collection of top-shelf beats and uncompromising-though-still-pop-enough raps that justifies the fairly awful personalities driving it, which, depending on your tolerance for wounded narcissism and a complete lack of insight, is either fascinating or frustrating."

Randall Roberts of the Los Angeles Times stated, "The album's haunting highlight – and one of the best hip-hop tracks of the year – is the last one. Called "S.N.I.T.C.H.", it thrives on understated tension as Pusha and guest vocalist Pharrell recount an interaction with an old friend who had decided to become a police informant. It's the perfect conclusion to a consistently surprising hip-hop album." Lauren Martin of Fact gave the album three and a half stars out of five, saying "In short, on My Name Is My Name, Pusha doesn't really give much away about his past, present or future, and it's a disconcerting thought for an album posited as a vanguard for a more "real" presentation of rap". Russ Bengtson of Complex said, "it's a never-hit-skip album made by a 36-year-old rapper with more hunger than most 15 years his junior."

=== Accolades ===
Closing out the year, My Name Is My Name was named to multiple "Best Albums of the Year" lists. It was ranked at number 33 on Rolling Stone's list of the 50 best albums of 2013. They commented saying, "The cockier half of the Clipse didn't choose to go solo – he had to after his brother found God. Pusha, in turn, found Kanye West, whose stark and twisted production helped make My Name Is My Name feel like a more lyrically focused companion piece to his own Yeezus. It's the year's sharpest hit of street philosophy." Complex named it the third best album of 2013. They elaborated saying, "everything clicks because of the way it was calculated. The songs benefit from their respective placement beside each other, each track a background for the next. In that way, it brings the Pusha T fan up to speed with what he's evolved into, without leaving them in unfamiliar territory. If you were the reluctant "we want that old Pusha T" fan, then it fed you the teaspoon of updated classic with the medicine of his reinvention—and by the end, you appreciated both sides." Nick Catucci of Entertainment Weekly named it the eighth best album of 2013 saying, "With these beats – private-stash stuff from the likes of his label boss Kanye West and Pharrell Williams – he could sell fire in hell. In fact, Pusha plumbs his emotional depths, breaking down his parents' divorce after 35 years of marriage and his conflicted feelings about his brother." Exclaim! named it the second best hip-hop album of 2013. XXL named it the fourth best album of 2013. They commented saying, "Song for song, it's tough to put any album in the same category as Pusha's proper solo debut. In the space of a trim 46 minutes, Push coaxed the best verse of Rick Ross' year on "Hold On", made Kendrick Lamar get dark and grim on "Nosetalgia" and even rapped over a beat that seemed impossible to make into a hip-hop track on "King Push", all while keeping his lyricism at the absolute highest level. The worst song on this album could find its way onto a top ten list. If this is what a post-Yeezus world sounds like, sign us up immediately."

Spin positioned it at number 46 on their list of the best 50 albums of 2013. They said, "Push is in fighting form, incorporating a mature point of view on his drug-dealer past while rapping with the confidence of a man who knows the game is his to lose." NME positioned it at number 48 on their list of the 50 best albums of year. They said, My Name Is My Name was the moment Clipse member Pusha T finally hit the home run he promised for so long. The beats snapped hard, the guests including Kendrick Lamar, Rick Ross and 2 Chainz glittered and the overall vibe was dirty but triumphant." Paste ranked it number 34 on their list of the 50 best albums of 2013 saying, "each bar has the ferociousness of a lion smelling the scent of fresh blood. Among his contemporaries, Pusha T is the sharp-witted wordsmith who makes you feel like you're listening to a master at work, devilishly cooking up something as pure and addictive as he possibly can." It was named the third best hip hop album of 2013 by PopMatters. They commented saying, "My Name Is My Name is easily one of the most impressive displays of lyricism of the year and contains some of 2013's best verses, as Pusha shows off his versatility..... The production is minimalistic and intelligently doesn't overshadow Pusha's performance. The beats are big and full of bass, giving life to the album and forming a unique theme, with a reunion with Pharrell triggering a nice blast of nostalgia..... My Name Is My Name has substance, style, and passion, and no doubt is an album that will still be appreciated a decade from now." Consequence positioned it at number 44 on their list of the 50 best albums of the year.

== Commercial performance ==
My Name Is My Name debuted at number four on the US Billboard 200, selling 74,000 copies in its first week of release. In its second week the album dropped to number 14 on the Billboard 200, selling 20,000 more copies. In its third week, the album dropped to twelve more places, selling 10,000 more copies in the United States.

Internationally, the album peaked at number 56 on the UK Albums Chart, number 36 in Denmark, and number 98 in Switzerland. It also charted in other countries such as France and Belgium.

== Track listing ==
My Name Is My Name track listing
No.	Title	Writer(s)	Producer(s)	Length
1.	"King Push"	Terrence Thornton; Kanye West; Sebastian Sartor	West; Sartor	2:52
2.	"Numbers on the Boards"	Thornton; Don Cannon; West; Charles Njapa; Bunny Sigler; Shawn Carter; Chris Martin; Anthony King; John Matthews	Cannon; West; 88-Keys^{[b]}	2:43
3.	"Sweet Serenade" (featuring Chris Brown)	Thornton; Kasseem Dean; West; Chris Brown	Swizz Beatz; West^{[b]}	3:39
4.	"Hold On" (featuring Rick Ross)	Thornton; West; Ross Birchard; William Roberts II; Michael Hawkins; Janice Hutson; Leroy Hutson; Joe Reaves; Willis Norman	West; Hudson Mohawke	4:45
5.	"Suicide" (featuring Ab-Liva)	Thornton; Pharrell Williams; Rennard East	Williams	3:42
6.	"40 Acres" (featuring The-Dream)	Thornton; Ricardo Lamarre; Terius Nash	Rico Beats; The-Dream	4:42
7.	"No Regrets" (featuring Jeezy and Kevin Cossom)	Thornton; Birchard; Bobby "Beewirks" Yewah; Jay Jenkins; Kevin Cossom	Hudson Mohawke; Beewirks^{[a]}	4:48
8.	"Let Me Love You" (featuring Kelly Rowland)	Thornton; Nash; John Glass; Jeppe Thybo; Nick Johnsen	The-Dream; Glass John^{[b]}	3:43
9.	"Who I Am" (featuring 2 Chainz and Big Sean)	Thornton; West; Emmanuel "Mano" Nickerson; Tauheed Epps; Sean Anderson; Renee Scroggins; Sey Kwesi	West; Mano	3:41
10.	"Nosetalgia" (featuring Kendrick Lamar)	Thornton; West; Dominick Lamb; Anthony Khan; Kendrick Duckworth; Scott La Rock; Lawrence Parker; Homer Banks; Carl Hampton; Raymond Jackson; Trevor Horn; Malcolm McLaren	Nottz; West; The Twilite Tone^{[b]}	3:36
11.	"Pain" (featuring Future)	Thornton; West; Nayvadius Wilburn; Laxmikant–Pyarelal; Anand Bakshi	West; No I.D.^{[a]}	4:11
12.	"S.N.I.T.C.H." (featuring Pharrell)	Thornton; Williams	Williams	4:03
Total length:				46:25

Notes

- ^{^a} signifies a co-producer
- ^{^b} signifies an additional producer
- "Hold On" features uncredited vocals from Kanye West

Sample credits

- "Numbers on the Boards" contains samples of "Shake Your Booty", written and performed by Bunny Sigler; samples of "Intro / A Million And One Questions / Rhyme No More", written by Jay-Z and Chris Martin performed by the former; and samples of "Pots and Pans", written and performed by Anthony King and John Matthews, as included on the Luke Vibert compilation Nuggets.
- "Hold On" contains samples of "Ghet-To-Funk", written by W. Norman performed by Duralcha.
- "Let Me Love You" contains samples of "Audition", written by Jeppe Thybo and Nick Johnsen performed by The Robotboys.
- "Who I Am" contains samples of "U.F.O", written by R. Scroggins performed by ESG; and samples of "LGOYH", written and performed by Kwes.
- "Nosetalgia" contains samples of "The Bridge Is Over", written by Scott La Rock and Lawrence Parker performed by Boogie Down Productions; samples of "(If Loving You Is Wrong) I Don't Want to Be Right", written by Homer Banks, Carl Hampton and Raymond Jackson performed by Bobby Bland; and samples of "Do You Like Scratchin'", written by Trevor Horn and Malcolm McLaren performed by Malcolm McLaren.
- "Pain" contains samples of "My Name Is Anthony Gonsalves", written by Laxmikant–Pyarelal and Anand Bakshi performed by Kishore Kumar.

== Personnel ==
Credits adapted from AllMusic.

- 2 Chainz – featured artist
- Ab-Liva – featured artist
- Virgil Abloh – creative director
- Paul Bailey – engineer
- Rico Beats – producer
- Jeff Bhasker – instrumentation
- Big Sean – featured artist
- Bobby "Blue" Bland – sample source
- Chris Brown – featured artist, mixing assistant
- Darhyl "DJ" Camper – keyboards
- Don Cannon – engineer, producer
- Capricorn Clark – creative director
- Kevin Cossom – featured artist
- Shawn "Pecas" Costner – vocals
- Matthew Desrameaux – assistant
- The-Dream – featured artist
- Duralcha – sample source
- ESG – sample source
- Future – featured artist
- Glass John – additional production
- Noah Goldstein – engineer, mixing, programming
- Hudson Mohawke – producer
- Jay-Z – sample source
- Jeezy – featured artist
- Jesse Kanda – slipcover concept
- Anthony Kilhoffer – engineer, mixing
- Kishmore Kumar – sample source
- Kwes – sample source
- Kendrick Lamar – featured artist
- Mike Larson – digital arrangement, editing, engineer, mixing
- Tai Linzie – production photography
- Malcolm McLaren – sample source
- Vlado Meller – mastering
- Fabien Montique – photography
- Terius "The-Dream" Nash – producer
- Charles Njapa – additional production
- Nottz – producer
- Keith Parry – assistant
- Joe Perez – creative assistance
- Andy Proctor – package production
- Pusha T – primary artist
- Tony Rey – engineer
- The Robotsboys – sample source
- Kyle Ross – mixing assistant
- Rick Ross – featured artist
- Kelly Rowland – featured artist
- Sebastian Sartor – producer
- Justin Saunders – art direction
- Gennaro Schiano – assistant
- Bart Schoudel – engineer
- Bunny Sigler – sample source
- Swizz Beatz – producer
- Terrence Thornton – producer
- Patrick Thrall – engineer
- The Twilite Tone – additional production
- Marcos Valle – sample source
- Luke Vibert – sample source
- Steven Victor – producer
- Kanye West – additional production, executive producer, producer
- Aleks White – assistant, mixing assistant
- Finis "KY" White – vocal engineer, vocal mixing
- Pharrell Williams – featured artist, producer
- Bobby Yewah – producer
- Kristen Yiengst – production photography

== Charts ==
=== Weekly charts ===
Chart performance for My Name Is My Name
Chart (2013)	Peak position
Belgian Albums (Ultratop Flanders)	120
Belgian Albums (Ultratop Wallonia)	159
Danish Albums (Hitlisten)	36
French Albums (SNEP)	197
Swiss Albums (Schweizer Hitparade)	98
UK Albums (Official Charts)	56
UK R&B Albums (Official Charts)	6
US Billboard 200	4
US Top R&B/Hip-Hop Albums (Billboard)	2

=== Year-end charts ===
2013 year-end chart performance for My Name Is My Name
Chart (2013)	Position
US Top R&B/Hip-Hop Albums (Billboard)	49

2014 year-end chart performance for My Name Is My Name
Chart (2014)	Position
US Top R&B/Hip-Hop Albums (Billboard)	78

== Release history ==
Release formats for My Name Is My Name
Region	Date	Label	Format	Ref.
Australia	October 7, 2013	GOOD; Def Jam; Island Def Jam	CD; digital download	
Belgium	October 7, 2013	GOOD; Def Jam; Island Def Jam	CD; digital download	
France	October 7, 2013	GOOD; Def Jam; Island Def Jam	CD; digital download	
Germany	October 7, 2013	GOOD; Def Jam; Island Def Jam	CD; digital download	
Ireland	October 7, 2013	GOOD; Def Jam; Island Def Jam	CD; digital download	
Italy	October 7, 2013	GOOD; Def Jam; Island Def Jam	CD; digital download	
Netherlands	October 7, 2013	GOOD; Def Jam; Island Def Jam	CD; digital download	
New Zealand	October 7, 2013	GOOD; Def Jam; Island Def Jam	CD; digital download	
Norway	October 7, 2013	GOOD; Def Jam; Island Def Jam	CD; digital download	
Spain	October 7, 2013	GOOD; Def Jam; Island Def Jam	CD; digital download	
Sweden	October 7, 2013	GOOD; Def Jam; Island Def Jam	CD; digital download	
Switzerland	October 7, 2013	GOOD; Def Jam; Island Def Jam	CD; digital download	
United Kingdom	October 7, 2013	GOOD; Def Jam; Island Def Jam	CD; digital download	
Canada	October 8, 2013	GOOD; Def Jam	CD; digital download	
United States	October 8, 2013	GOOD; Def Jam	CD; digital download	
