= Burst Oral Care =

American oral hygiene company

- Company type: Private
- Industry: Oral hygiene
- Founded: 2017
- Founder: Hamish Khayat and Brittany Stewart
- Headquarters: California

Burst is an American brand of toothpaste and other oral hygiene products made by the e-commerce company Burst Oral Care. It makes electric toothbrushes, dental floss, and tooth whitening strips. The company was co-founded in 2017 by Hamish Khayat and Brittany Stewart in California.

== History ==
Hamish Khayat partnered with Brittany Stewart to build a direct-to-consumer company with a subscription-based business model. The company initially offered electric toothbrushes and later expanded to tooth whitening strips, toothpaste and dental floss.

Burst works with dental professionals to develop oral care products. As of January 2020, the company recruited roughly 25,000 dentists and dental hygienists in the United States to champion their merchandise in the United States in exchange for compensation. The subscription model allows users to purchase products online, or through a dental professional, and gives them a refill every three months.

In May 2020, Burst Oral Care raised a Series C funding round, led by GS Growth, Goldman Sachs' growth equity platform, to support their ongoing growth and extension of their product line. The investment follows a total of $20 million of funding from Volition Capital and a small group of angel investors.

== Awards ==
- 2018 London Design Awards - Gold Winner
- 2018 Stevie Awards - Startup of the Year, Consumer Product

== See also ==
- List of toothpaste brands
- Index of oral health and dental articles
