= Flip It Like Disick =

American reality television series

- Also known as: Royally Flipped.
- Genre: Reality television
- Starring: Scott Disick; Willa Ford; Benny Luciano; Kozet Luciano; Miki Mor; Lindsay Diamond
- Country of origin: United States
- Original language: English
- No. of seasons: 1
- No. of episodes: 8

Production
- Executive producers: Ryan Holcomb; Justin Burns; Scott Disick; Jason Goldberg; Lori Gordon; Kris Jenner
- Production companies: Ryan Seacrest Productions; Tower 2 Productions

Original release
- Network: E!
- Release: August 4 – September 29, 2019

Related
- Keeping Up with the Kardashians

Flip It Like Disick is an American reality television series that aired on the E! cable network. The series debuted on August 4, 2019, and consisted of eight episodes. It followed Scott Disick and his team as they renovated luxury homes in the greater Los Angeles area. Disick's team is made up of his best friend and business partner Benny Luciano, realtor Kozet Luciano (Benny's wife), Disick's assistant Lindsay Diamond, contractor Miki Mor, and interior designer and former pop-singer Willa Ford. The first season had numerous guest stars, including Steve Aoki, Kris Jenner, and Sofia Richie.

The series featured Disick and his team attempting to purchase and renovate the Jed Smith House. The completely renovated house was initially listed for more than double the price for which they purchased it. As of April 2020, the house had not sold. Purchased for $3.235 million in April 2018 by Disick and his team, the house finally sold for $5.6 million in November 2020.

== Episodes ==
No.	Title	Original release date	U.S. viewers (millions)
1	"The Lord Is Back"	August 4, 2019	0.455
Disick and the team go to Las Vegas to remodel Steve Aoki's mansion.
2	"Family Matters"	August 11, 2019	0.394
The team has purchased the Jed Smith house and the plans are ready, but Miki and Willa are at odds about how to move forward.
3	"Miki vs. Malibu"	August 18, 2019	0.358
Scott decides to redo the pool at his personal residence.
4	"Jungle Rules"	August 25, 2019	0.289
The homeowner's association threatens to shut them down and Miki feels disrespected.
5	"Unexpected Help"	September 8, 2019	0.342
Willa and Benny renovate their offices.
6	"More Money, More Problems"	September 15, 2019	0.384
A problem at the Jed Smith house threatens to jeopardize the entire project.
7	"Thank You, Next"	September 22, 2019	0.377
The team considers different options regarding how to move forward with the Jed Smith house.
8	"The Race To The Finish"	September 29, 2019	0.279
The team attempts to finish the Jed Smith house and get it listed before the end of summer.
