= Numbers on the Boards =

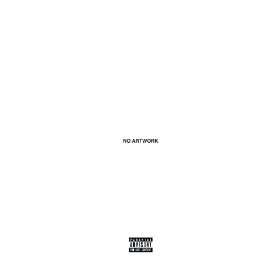

Single by Pusha T

from the album My Name Is My Name
- Released: May 10, 2013
- Recorded: 2013
- Genre: Hip hop
- Length: 2:34
- Label: GOOD Music; Def Jam
- Songwriters: Terrence Thornton; Don Cannon; Charles Njapa; Bunny Sigler; Kanye West; Shawn Carter; Chris Martin; Anthony King; John Matthews
- Producers: Don Cannon; Kanye West; 88-Keys

Pusha T singles chronology
"Millions" (2013)	"Numbers on the Boards" (2013)	"Sweet Serenade" (2013)

"Numbers on the Boards" is a song by American rapper Pusha T from his debut studio album My Name Is My Name (2013). It was produced by Don Cannon, Kanye West and 88-Keys. On May 10, 2013, the song was officially released as the album's second official single by GOOD Music and Def Jam Recordings.

The song received critical acclaim from music critics. On April 29, 2013 Rolling Stone gave the song "Numbers on the Boards" 4 out of 5 stars, stating "The star is Kanye West's beat, a contusive bass blur with percussion that's like bamboo sticks on a busted radiator. The result is near-perfect no-bullshit hip-hop." On May 9, 2013, the music video was released for "Numbers on the Boards" which featured cameo appearances from Kanye West and Chief Keef.

The video was shot in Paris. The Kanye West and Don Cannon-produced song was then released as the album's second single the following day. Crack Magazine named it the 11th best song of the 2010s decade.

== Charts ==
Chart (2013)	Peak position
Australia Urban (ARIA)	28
Mexico Ingles Airplay (Billboard)	50
