= Millions (Pusha T song) =

Single by Pusha T featuring Rick Ross

from the album Wrath of Caine
- Released: January 29, 2013
- Recorded: 2012
- Genre: Hip hop; trap
- Length: 5:06
- Label: GOOD; Def Jam
- Songwriters: Terrence Thornton; Joshua Luellen; Kanye West; Ricardo Lamarre; Mike Dean; Terius Nash; William Roberts II
- Producers: Southside; West (co.); Rico Beats (add.); Dean (add.)

Pusha T singles chronology
"Dope Bitch" (2012)	"Millions" (2013)	"Numbers on the Boards" (2013)

Rick Ross singles chronology
"Bugatti" (2013)	"Millions" (2013)	"Believe It" (2013)

"Millions" is a song by American hip hop recording artist Pusha T, which was originally released as a promotional single for his then-upcoming album My Name Is My Name, on January 29, 2013. It was later revealed that the song would not be featured on the album. It was also included on his 2013 mixtape Wrath of Caine. The song, which features a guest appearance from fellow American rapper Rick Ross, peaked at number 47 on the Billboard Hot R&B/Hip-Hop Songs chart.

== Music video ==
The music video for "Millions" was directed by Samuel Rogers, and filmed during late January 2013. On January 24, Def Jam released a trailer for the music video. The full video was released on February 11, 2013. It was described as "massively cliched, full of drug-dealer iconography: Guns, expensive cars, beautiful but duplicitous girls, and police raids" by Stereogum, but explained that it worked due to the charisma of both rappers.

== Charts ==
Chart (2013)	Peak position
US Bubbling Under Hot 100 (Billboard)	24
US Hot R&B/Hip-Hop Songs (Billboard)	47

== Release history ==
Region	Date	Label
United States	January 29, 2013	GOOD Music, Def Jam
