= List of songs recorded by Meghan Trainor =

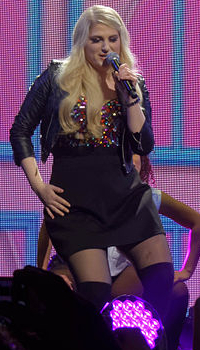
Trainor performing on the Jingle Ball Tour 2014 at the Wells Fargo Center in December 2014

American singer-songwriter Meghan Trainor has recorded songs for seven studio albums, two extended plays (EP), two live albums, three independent albums and guest features. Trainor self-released three albums: Meghan Trainor (2009), I'll Sing with You (2011) and Only 17 (2011). When she signed with Epic Records in February 2014, her three self-produced albums were pulled from circulation.

Trainor's debut EP, Title, released in September 2014, was preceded by the single "All About That Bass". Musically, the EP has a throwback style sound with its 1950s doo wop-inspired songs straddling the line between modern R&B and melodic pop. Its lyrics contemplate 21st century womanhood. Her debut major-label studio album Title, released in January 2015, included the singles: "All About That Bass", "Lips Are Movin", "Dear Future Husband" and "Like I'm Gonna Lose You". She collaborated with other artists, including Chris Gelbuda, Jesse Frasure, John Legend and Shy Carter, for the album. Title was inspired by Trainor's love for throwback style records and music from the 1950s and 1960s. She combined different musical genres, including Caribbean, doo-wop, hip hop, soca and pop, for the album. Trainor has appeared as a featured artist on Charlie Puth's song "Marvin Gaye", and has contributed songs to soundtracks: "Better When I'm Dancin'" for The Peanuts Movie, and "I'm a Lady" for Smurfs: The Lost Village.

Trainor's second major-label studio album Thank You, released in May 2016, included the singles: "No", "Me Too" and "Better". She created the R&B album in hopes to showcase her "Caribbean side" and her love for Aretha Franklin, Bruno Mars and Elvis Presley. Trainor released several songs in 2018, including the singles "No Excuses", "Let You Be Right" and "Can't Dance". Later that year, she released "Just Got Paid", a collaboration with Sigala and Ella Eyre featuring French Montana. Trainor and Eyre's vocals on the song received praise from some critics and were dubbed "poppy". Trainor's second EP, The Love Train, released in February 2019, included the single "All the Ways". Trainor's third major-label studio album, Treat Myself, was released in January 2020, followed by her fourth, A Very Trainor Christmas, in October. Takin' It Back, her fifth major-label studio album, was released on October 21, 2022. Trainor released her sixth major-label studio album, Timeless, on June 7, 2024. Toy with Me, her seventh major-label studio album, followed on April 24, 2026.

== Songs ==
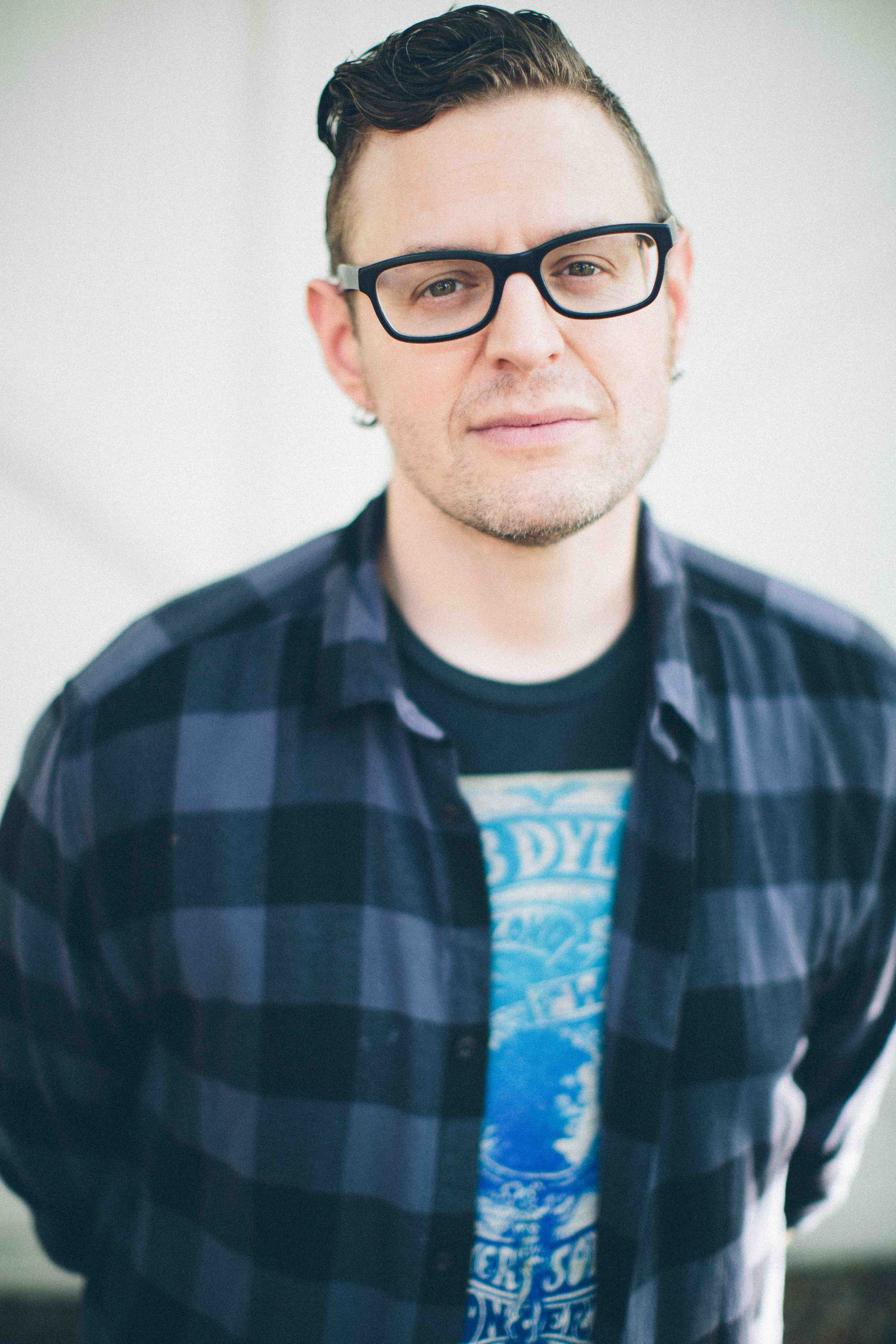
Kevin Kadish co-wrote eight songs on Trainor's album Title, and produced all of them.

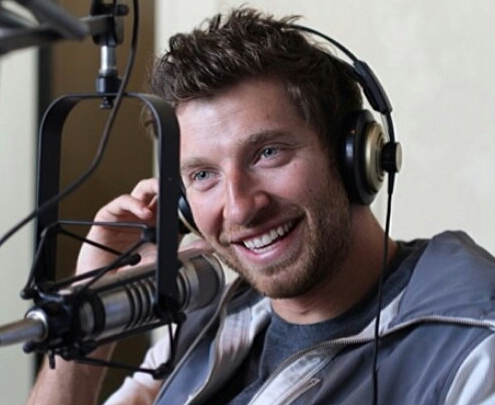
Trainor recorded "Baby, It's Cold Outside" as a duet with Brett Eldredge.

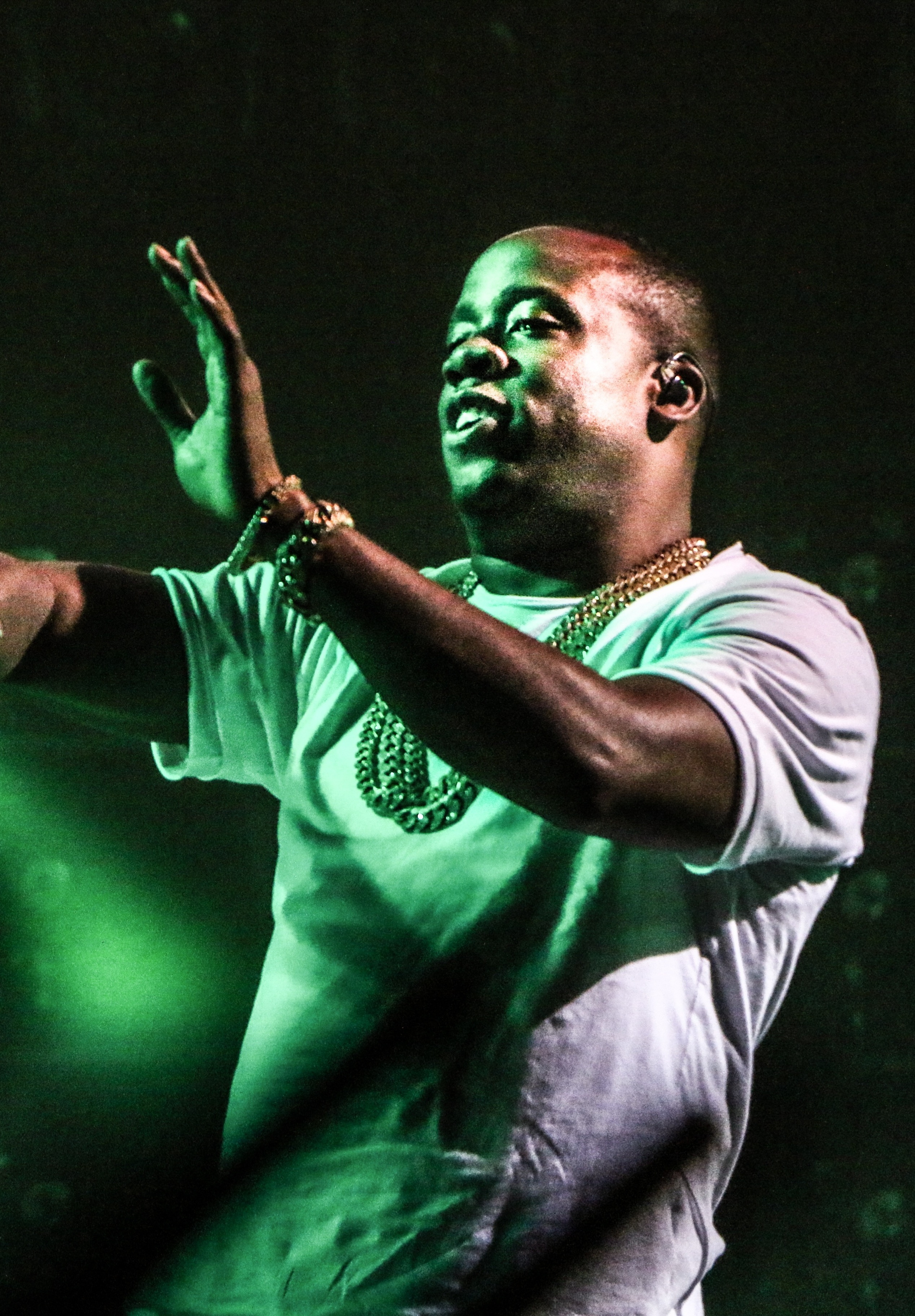
Yo Gotti co-wrote and featured on "Better".

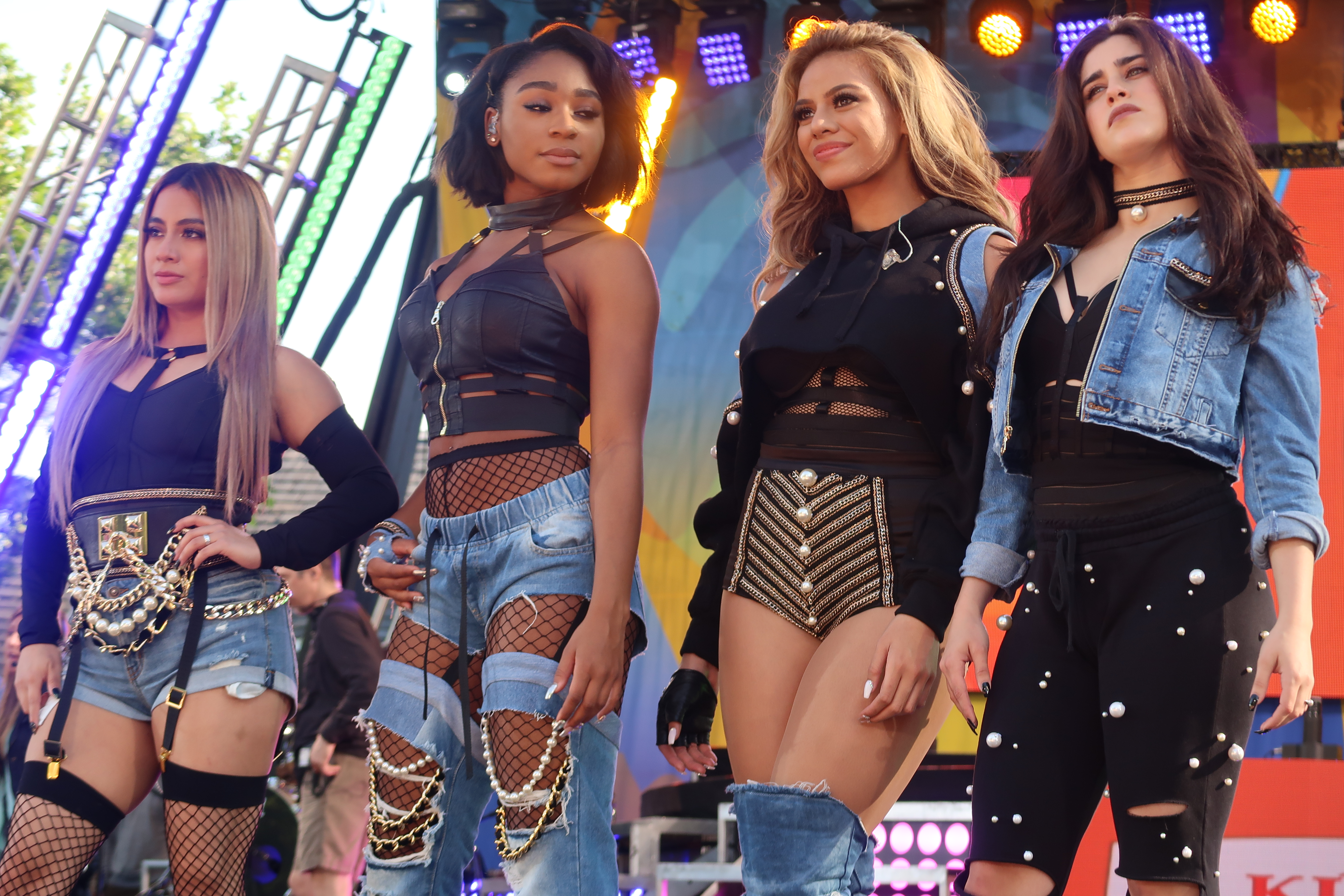
Trainor co-wrote and featured on Fifth Harmony's song "Brave Honest Beautiful".

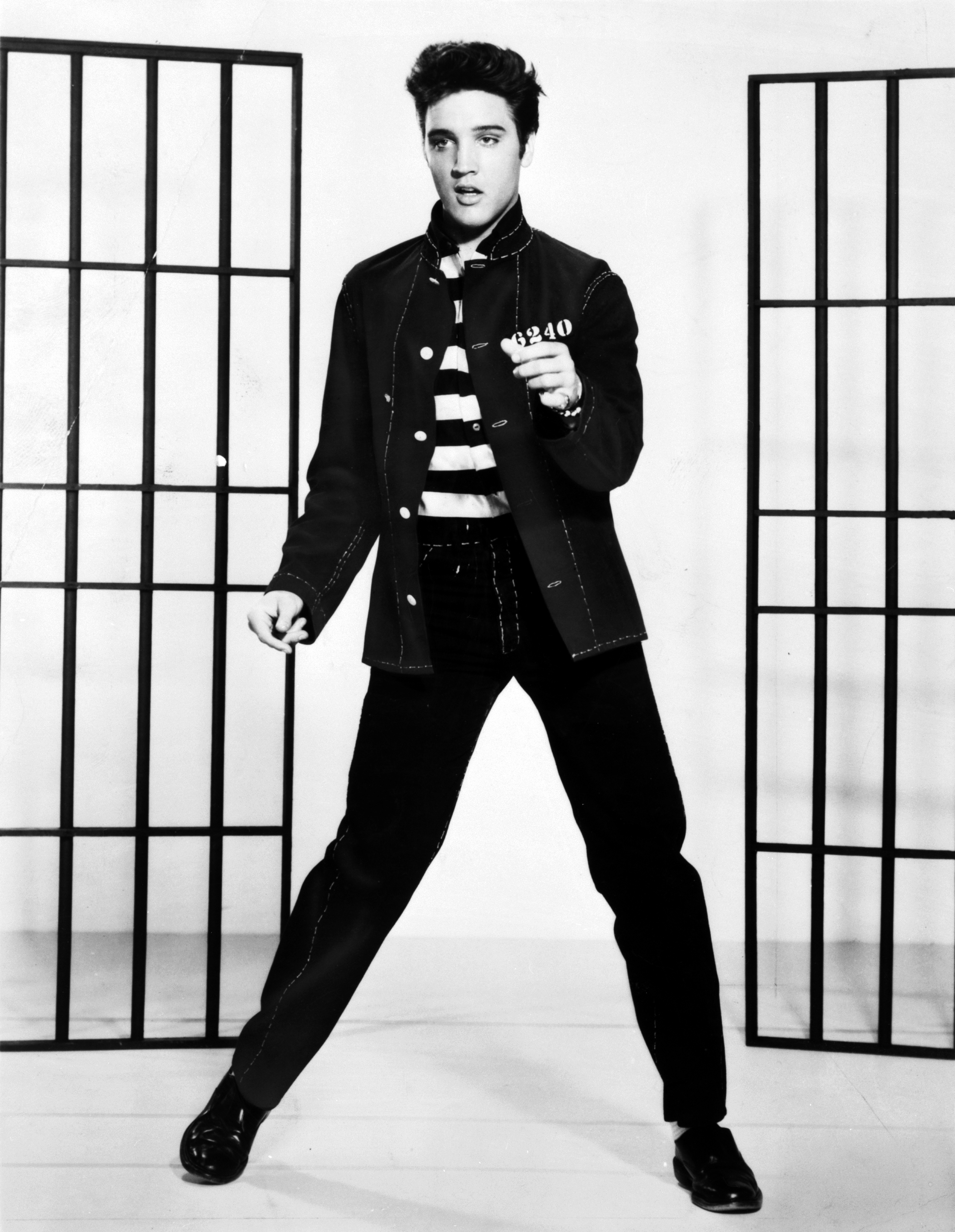
Trainor covered Elvis Presley's "Can't Help Falling in Love".

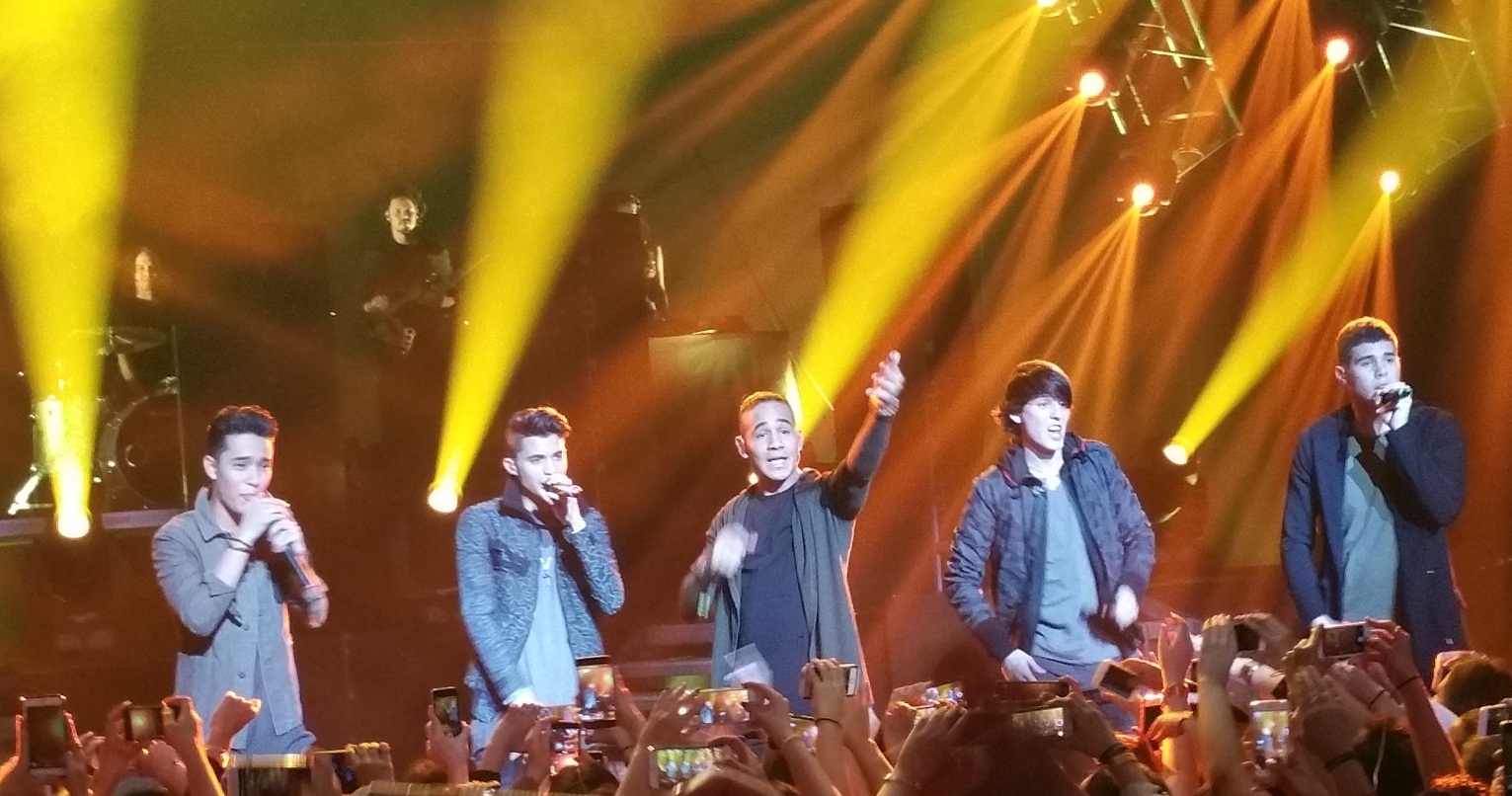
Trainor appeared on a remix of CNCO's song "Hey DJ" and also co-wrote it.

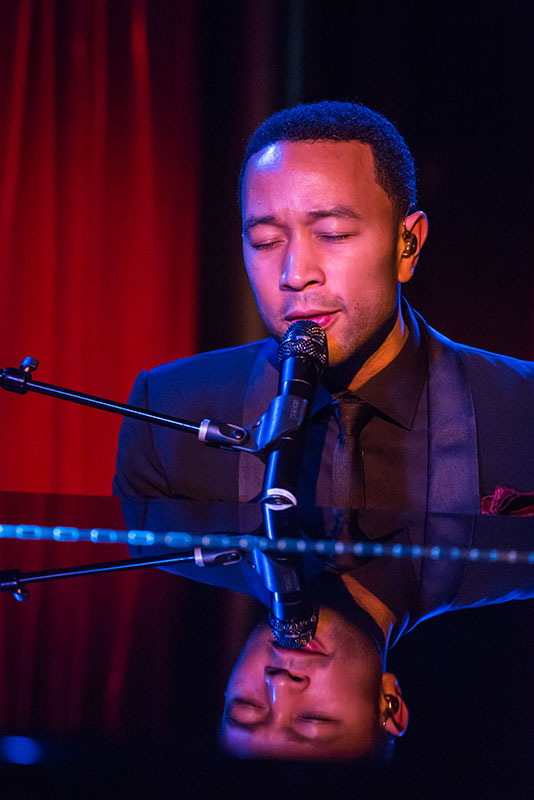
John Legend was featured on "Like I'm Gonna Lose You".

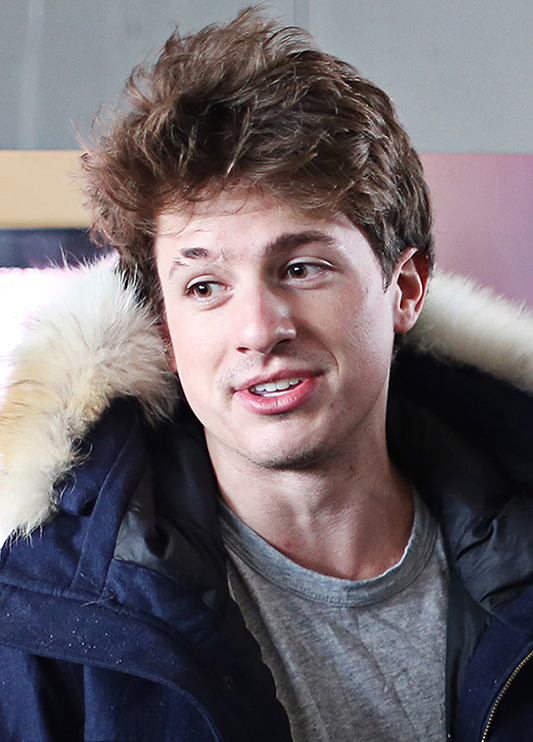
Trainor was featured on Charlie Puth's song "Marvin Gaye".

Key
‡	Indicates songs written solely by Meghan Trainor

Name of song, featured performers, writer(s), original release, and year of release
Song	Artist(s)	Writer(s)	Original release	Year	Ref.
"3am"	Meghan Trainor	Meghan Trainor; Chris Gelbuda; Ben Fagan; Todd Carey; Karen Thornton	Title	2015	
"After You"	Meghan Trainor	Meghan Trainor; Tyler Johnson; Anders Mouridsen; Justin Trainor	The Love Train	2019	
"All About That Bass"	Meghan Trainor	Meghan Trainor; Kevin Kadish	Title	2015	
"All the Ways"	Meghan Trainor	Meghan Trainor; Andrew Wells; Jacob Kasher Hindlin	The Love Train	2018	
"Alright"	Sam Fischer and Meghan Trainor	Sam Fischer; Meghan Trainor; Britten Newbill; Ryan Williamson	I Love You, Please Don't Hate Me	2023	
"Angels"	Meghan Trainor	Meghan Trainor; Emily Bear; Nicole "Kole" Cohen; Hal Rosenfeld	Toy with Me	2026	
"Another Opinion"	Meghan Trainor	Meghan Trainor; Tyler Johnson; Ryan Trainor	Treat Myself	2020	
"Ashes"	Meghan Trainor	Meghan Trainor; Sophie Frances Cooke; Daniel Gleyzer	Treat Myself	2020	
"Baby, It's Cold Outside"	Brett Eldredge featuring Meghan Trainor	Frank Loesser	Glow	2016	
"Babygirl"	Meghan Trainor	Meghan Trainor; Mike Sabath; Samuel Romans	Treat Myself	2020	
"Back to My Home"	Meghan Trainor featuring Matthew Migliozzi	Meghan Trainor; Matthew Migliozzini	I'll Sing with You	2011	
"Bad for Me"	Meghan Trainor featuring Teddy Swims	Meghan Trainor; Stephen Wrabel; Ajay Bhattacharya; Federico Vindver	Takin' It Back	2022	
"Badass Woman"	Meghan Trainor	Meghan Trainor ‡	Non-album single	2019	
"Bang Dem Sticks"	Meghan Trainor	Meghan Trainor; James G. Morales; Matthew Morales; Julio David Rodriguez	Title	2015	
"Been Like This"	Meghan Trainor and T-Pain	Meghan Trainor; Faheem Najm; Kurt Thum; Ryan Trainor; Gian Stone; Grant Boutin	Timeless	2024	
"The Best Part (Interlude)"	Meghan Trainor	Meghan Trainor ‡	Title	2015	
"Bestie"	Meghan Trainor	Meghan Trainor; Sean Douglas; Gian Stone; Grant Boutin	Timeless	2024	
"Better"	Meghan Trainor featuring Yo Gotti	Meghan Trainor; Eric Frederic; Tommy Brown; Steven Franks; Mario Mims; Taylor Parks; Travis Sayles	Thank You	2016	
"Better When I'm Dancin'"	Meghan Trainor	Meghan Trainor; Thaddeus Dixon	The Peanuts Movie	2015	
"Bite Me"	Meghan Trainor		Timeless	2024	
"Blink"	Meghan Trainor	Meghan Trainor; Bruce Fielder; Steve Manovski; Ryan Trainor	Treat Myself	2020	
"Booty"	Meghan Trainor featuring Paul Russell	Meghan Trainor; Paul Russell; Emily Warren; Ryan Trainor; Federico Vindver	Timeless	2024	
"Boys Like You"	Who Is Fancy featuring Meghan Trainor and Ariana Grande	Jake Hagood; Jonathan Rotem; Jason Gantt; Bob DiPiero	Non-album single	2015	
"Brave Honest Beautiful"	Fifth Harmony featuring Meghan Trainor	Meghan Trainor; Beyoncé Knowles; Kelendria Rowland; Rob Fusari; Falonte Moore; Stephanie Lynn Nicks	Reflection	2015	
"Breezy"	Meghan Trainor featuring Theron Theron	Meghan Trainor; Gian Stone; Federico Vindver; Theron Thomas	Takin' It Back	2022	
"Broken Puzzle"	Meghan Trainor	Meghan Trainor ‡	Only 17	2011	
"Can't Dance"	Meghan Trainor	Meghan Trainor; Andrew Wells; Jacob Kasher Hindlin	Non-album single	2018	
"Can't Help Falling in Love" (cover)	Meghan Trainor	Hugo Peretti; Luigi Creatore; George David Weiss	Spotify Sessions	2015	
"Champagne Problems"	Meghan Trainor	Meghan Trainor; Tommy Brown; Nick Audino; Lewis Hughes; Khaled Rohaim; Michael Foster; Ryan Matthew Tedder	Thank You	2016	
"Chasin'"	Paris Hilton and Meghan Trainor	Meghan Trainor; Ryan Trainor; Yannick Rastogi; Zacharie Raymond; Paris Hilton	Infinite Icon	2024	
"Chef's Kiss"	Meghan Trainor	Meghan Trainor; Caroline Ailin; Grant Boutin; Delacey; Mark Schick	Toy with Me	2026	
"Chicken Little"	Spencer Sutherland and Meghan Trainor	Spencer Sutherland; Meghan Trainor; Sam Fischer; Keaton Robert Stromberg; Hero Delano	Non-album single	2023	
"Christmas (Baby Please Come Home)" (cover)	Meghan Trainor	Jeff Barry; Ellie Greenwich; Phil Spector	A Very Trainor Christmas	2021	
"Christmas Coupon"	Meghan Trainor	Meghan Trainor; Justin Trainor; Ryan Trainor	A Very Trainor Christmas	2021	
"Christmas Got Me Blue"	Meghan Trainor	Meghan Trainor; Ryan Met; Justin Trainor; Ryan Trainor	A Very Trainor Christmas	2020	
"Christmas Party"	Meghan Trainor	Meghan Trainor; Ryan Met; Justin Trainor; Ryan Trainor	A Very Trainor Christmas	2020	
"The Christmas Song" (cover)	Meghan Trainor	Robert Wells; Mel Tormé	A Very Trainor Christmas	2020	
"Close Your Eyes"	Meghan Trainor	Meghan Trainor; Kevin Kadish	Title	2015	
"Credit"	Meghan Trainor	Meghan Trainor; Kevin Kadish	Title	2015	
"Criminals"	Meghan Trainor	Meghan Trainor; Tyler Johnson; Josh Kear	Timeless	2024	
"Crowded Room"	Meghan Trainor	Meghan Trainor; Emily Warren; Federico Vindver	Timeless	2024	
"Crushin'"	Meghan Trainor featuring Lawrence	Meghan Trainor; Clyde Lawrence; Gracie Lawrence; Jonny Koh; Jordan Cohen; Sean Douglas; Grant Boutin	Timeless	2024	
"Cry Baby"	Meghan Trainor	Meghan Trainor; Mike Sabath	Toy with Me	2026	
"Cupid"	Meghan Trainor featuring Gary Trainor	Meghan Trainor ‡	Only 17	2011	
"Dad"	Meghan Trainor	Meghan Trainor ‡	Meghan Trainor	2009	
"Dance About It"	Meghan Trainor	Meghan Trainor; Justin Trainor; Ryan Trainor	Takin' It Back	2022	
"Dance like Yo Daddy"	Meghan Trainor	Meghan Trainor; Eric Frederic; Kevin Kadish	Thank You	2016	
"Dear Future Husband"	Meghan Trainor	Meghan Trainor; Kevin Kadish	Title	2015	
"Delulu"	Meghan Trainor	Meghan Trainor; Caroline Pennell; Ryan Trainor; Gabe Yaron	Toy with Me	2026	
"Doin' It All for You'"	Meghan Trainor	Meghan Trainor; Chris Gelbuda; Grant Boutin; Justin Trainor; Ryan Trainor	Timeless	2024	
"Don't Fall Tonight"	Meghan Trainor	Meghan Trainor ‡	Meghan Trainor	2009	
"Don't I Make It Look Easy"	Meghan Trainor	Meghan Trainor; Maureen McDonald; Federico Vindver	Takin' It Back	2022	
"Don't Let Me Down"	Meghan Trainor	Meghan Trainor ‡	Meghan Trainor	2009	
"Don't Stop" (cover)	Meghan Trainor	Steve Robson busbee Luke Hemmings; Calum Hood	Spotify Sessions	2015	
"Drama Queen"	Meghan Trainor	Meghan Trainor; Sean Douglas; Federico Vindver	Takin' It Back	2022	
"Evil Twin"	Meghan Trainor	Meghan Trainor; Joshua Kear; Tyler Johnson; Ethan Snoreck	Treat Myself	2019	
"Falling"	Meghan Trainor	Meghan Trainor ‡	Meghan Trainor	2009	
"Final Breath"	Meghan Trainor	Meghan Trainor; Thomas Hull; Tyler Johnson	Takin' It Back	2022	
"Foolish"	Meghan Trainor	Meghan Trainor; Andrew Wells; Gamal Lewis; Jacob Kasher Hindlin	The Love Train	2019	
"Forget How to Love"	Meghan Trainor	Meghan Trainor; Scott Hoying; Justin Trainor; Ryan Trainor	Timeless	2024	
"Forgive Me Father"	DJ Khaled featuring Meghan Trainor, Wiz Khalifa and Wale	DJ Khaled; Travis Sayles; Michael Foster; Thomas Brown; Meghan Trainor; Wiz Khalifa; Olubowale Akintimehin	Major Key	2016	
"Free to Fly"	Meghan Trainor featuring Mike Viprino	Meghan Trainor ‡	I'll Sing with You	2011	
"Friends"	Meghan Trainor	Meghan Trainor; Eric Frederic; Tommy Brown; Steven Franks; Michael Foster; Ryan Matthew Tedder; Bianca Atterberry	Thank You	2016	
"Funk"	Meghan Trainor	Meghan Trainor; Mike Sabath; Eddie Benjamin; Ryan Trainor	Treat Myself	2020	
"Genetics"	Meghan Trainor	Meghan Trainor; Justin Tranter; Mike Sabath; Ryan Trainor	Treat Myself	2019	
"Get In Girl"	Meghan Trainor	Meghan Trainor; Grant Boutin; Delacey; Andrew Jackson; Mark Schick	Toy with Me	2026	
"Gifts for Me"	Meghan Trainor	Meghan Trainor; Emily Bear; Nicole "Kole" Cohen	Non-album single	2025	
"Good Mornin'"	Meghan Trainor featuring Gary Trainor	Meghan Trainor; Andrew Wells; Daryl Sabara	The Love Train	2019	
"Good to Be Alive"	Meghan Trainor	Meghan Trainor; Ryan Trainor	The Peanuts Movie	2015	
"Goosebumps"	Meghan Trainor	Meghan Trainor; Eric Frederic; Gamal Lewis; Eric Tobias Wincorn; Joe Spargur; Robert Riley; Charles White; Billy Ball	Thank You	2016	
"Grow Up"	Meghan Trainor	Meghan Trainor; Gian Stone; Sean Douglas	Takin' It Back	2023	
"Hands"	Among Artists for Orlando	Justin Tranter; Julia Michaels; BloodPop	Non-album single	2016	
"Hands on Me"	Jason Derulo featuring Meghan Trainor	Jason Derulo; Meghan Trainor; J Bach; Sarah Solovay; Shawn Charles; Kyle Buckley; Elof Loelv; Ben E. King; Jerry Leiber; Mike Stoller	Nu King	2023	
"Hate It Here"	Meghan Trainor	Meghan Trainor; Steph Jones; Gian Stone; Justin Trainor	Timeless	2024	
"Have You Now"	Meghan Trainor	Meghan Trainor; Sophie Frances Cooke	Treat Myself	2020	
"Have Yourself a Merry Little Christmas" (cover)	Meghan Trainor featuring Gary Trainor	Hugh Martin; Ralph Blane	A Very Trainor Christmas	2020	
"Heels"	Meghan Trainor	Meghan Trainor; Justin Trainor; Sean Douglas; Zach Skelton	Toy with Me	2026	
"Here to Stay"	Meghan Trainor	Meghan Trainor; Eddie Benjamin; Zach Skelton; Daniel Gleyzer	Treat Myself	2020	
"Hey DJ"	CNCO, Meghan Trainor and Sean Paul	Meghan Trainor; Sean Paul Henriques; Édgar Barrera; Chris Wallace; Edgardo Miranda; Matt Radosevich; Sofi de la Torre	Non-album single	2018	
"Hey Mr."	Meghan Trainor	Meghan Trainor ‡	Meghan Trainor	2009	
"Hold on to the Ones You Love"	Meghan Trainor	Meghan Trainor ‡	I'll Sing with You	2011	
"Holidays"	Meghan Trainor featuring Earth, Wind & Fire	Meghan Trainor; Mike Sabath; Phillip Bailey; Eddie Benjamin; Verdine White; Ralph Johnson	A Very Trainor Christmas	2020	
"Holly Jolly Christmas" (cover)	Meghan Trainor	Johnny Marks	A Very Trainor Christmas	2020	
"Hopeless Romantic"	Meghan Trainor	Meghan Trainor; Johan Carlsson; Ross Golan	Thank You	2016	
"Hurt Me"	Meghan Trainor	Ester Dean; Jack Newsome; Meghan Trainor; Mike Sabath; Nicole Cohen; Ryan Tedder; Shane McAnally; Zach Skelton	Non-album single	2019	
"Hush"	Meghan Trainor	Meghan Trainor; Caroline Ailin; Sean Douglas; Mike Sabath	Toy with Me	2026	
"I Believe in Santa"	Meghan Trainor	Meghan Trainor; Justin Trainor; Ryan Trainor	A Very Trainor Christmas	2020	
"I Don't Do Maybe"	Meghan Trainor	Meghan Trainor; Greg Evigan; Jason Evigan; Gian Stone	Timeless	2024	
"I Get It"	Meghan Trainor	Meghan Trainor; Jacob Kasher Hindlin; Federico Vindver	Timeless	2024	
"I Love Me"	Meghan Trainor featuring LunchMoney Lewis	Meghan Trainor; Eric Frederic; Jacob Kasher Hindlin; Gamal Lewis; Thomas Troelsen	Thank You	2016	
"I Wanna Thank Me"	Meghan Trainor featuring Niecy Nash	Meghan Trainor; Carol Nash; Jacob Kasher Hindlin; Federico Vindver	Timeless	2024	
"I Won't Let You Down"	Meghan Trainor	Meghan Trainor; Eric Frederic; Jacob Kasher Hindlin; Gamal Lewis	Thank You	2016	
"I'll Be Home"	Meghan Trainor	Meghan Trainor ‡	I'll Be Home for Christmas	2014	
"I'll Be There for You" (cover)	Meghan Trainor	Phil Sōlem; Danny Wilde; David Crane; Marta Kauffman; Michael Skloff; Allee Willis	Non-album single	2019	
"I'll Sing with You"	Meghan Trainor	Meghan Trainor ‡	I'll Sing with You	2011	
"I'll Wake Up for You"	Meghan Trainor	Meghan Trainor ‡	Meghan Trainor	2009	
"I'm a Dog Mom"	Meghan Trainor	Meghan Trainor ‡	Non-album single	2024	
"I'm a Lady"	Meghan Trainor	Meghan Trainor; Martin René	Non-album single	2017	
"I'm Down"	Meghan Trainor	Meghan Trainor; Andrew Wells; Tyler Johnson; Joshua Kear	The Love Train	2019	
"If You Love Her"	Forest Blakk featuring Meghan Trainor	Forest Blakk; Meghan Trainor; Steven Solomon	Non-album single	2021	
"It's Beginning to Look a Lot Like Christmas" (cover)	Meghan Trainor	Meredith Willson	A Very Trainor Christmas	2020	
"Jingle Bells" (cover)	Meghan Trainor	James Lord Pierpont	A Very Trainor Christmas	2023	
"Just a Friend to You"	Meghan Trainor	Meghan Trainor; Eric Frederic; Chris Gelbuda	Thank You	2016	
"Just Got Paid"	Sigala, Ella Eyre and Meghan Trainor featuring French Montana	Bruce Fielder; Ella McMahon; Steve Manovski; Karim Kharbouch; Nile Rodgers; Jason Pebworth	Brighter Days	2018	
"Just Wanna Cry"	Meghan Trainor	Meghan Trainor; Caroline Pennell; Grant Boutin; Ryan Trainor	Toy with Me	2026	
"Kid on Christmas"	Pentatonix featuring Meghan Trainor	Scott Hoying; Kevin Olusola; Matt Sallee; Meghan Trainor; Trannie Anderson; Jared Conrad	Holidays Around the World	2022	
"Kindly Calm Me Down"	Meghan Trainor	Meghan Trainor; Eric Frederic; James G. Morales; Matthew Morales; Julio David Rodriguez	Thank You	2016	
"Ladylike"	Meghan Trainor	Meghan Trainor; Jesse Fink; Pete Nappi	Toy with Me	2026	
"Last Christmas" (cover)	Meghan Trainor	George Michael	A Very Trainor Christmas	2020	
"Learning to Say I Love You"	Meghan Trainor	Meghan Trainor ‡	Meghan Trainor	2009	
"Leave a Kiss"	Meghan Trainor	Meghan Trainor ‡	Only 17	2011	
"Let You Be Right"	Meghan Trainor	Meghan Trainor; Andrew Wells; Jacob Kasher Hindlin	Non-album single	2018	
"Lie to Me"	Meghan Trainor	Meghan Trainor; Ryan Trainor; Justin Trainor	Treat Myself	2020	
"Like I'm Gonna Lose You"	Meghan Trainor featuring John Legend	Meghan Trainor; Justin Weaver; Caitlyn Smith	Title	2015	
"Lips Are Movin"	Meghan Trainor	Meghan Trainor; Kevin Kadish	Title	2015	
"Little One"	Meghan Trainor	Meghan Trainor; Mags Duval; Adam Yaron; Gabe Yaron	Toy with Me	2026	
"Locked In Love"	Meghan Trainor	Meghan Trainor ‡	Meghan Trainor	2009	
"Love Me More"	Meghan Trainor	Meghan Trainor ‡	Only 17	2011	
"Love On Hold"	Meghan Trainor featuring T-Pain	Meghan Trainor; Faheem Najm; Grant Boutin; Ryan Trainor; Justin Trainor	Timeless	2024	
"Love, Love, Love"	Meghan Trainor	Meghan Trainor ‡	I'll Sing with You	2011	
"Lucky"	Meghan Trainor	Meghan Trainor; Sean Douglas; Gian Stone	Takin' It Back	2022	
"Made You Look"	Meghan Trainor	Meghan Trainor; Sean Douglas; Federico Vindver	Takin' It Back	2022	
"Make a Move"	Meghan Trainor	Meghan Trainor; Sean Douglas; Gian Stone; Grant Boutin	Timeless	2024	
"Make You Dance"	Meghan Trainor	Meghan Trainor; Andrew Wells; Anthony Rossomando; Grace Barker	Treat Myself	2020	
"Mama Wanna Mambo"	Meghan Trainor featuring Natti Natasha and Arturo Sandoval	Meghan Trainor; Sean Douglas; Federico Vindver; Natalia Batista; Arturo Sandoval	Takin' It Back	2022	
"Marry Me"	Meghan Trainor	Meghan Trainor ‡	The Love Train	2019	
"Marvin Gaye"	Charlie Puth featuring Meghan Trainor	Charlie Puth; Julie Frost; Jacob Luttrell; Nick Seeley	Some Type of Love and Nine Track Mind	2015	
"Me Too"	Meghan Trainor	Meghan Trainor; Eric Frederic; Jacob Kasher Hindlin; Jason Desrouleaux; Peter Svensson	Thank You	2016	
"Men's Tears"	Meghan Trainor	Meghan Trainor; Grant Boutin; Laura Veltz; Madi Yanofsky	Toy with Me	2026	
"Mind Reader"	Mimi Webb and Meghan Trainor	Meghan Trainor; Amelia Anne Webb; Grant Boutin; Nicole "Kole" Cohen; Federico Vindver	Confessions	2025	
"Mom"	Meghan Trainor featuring Kelli Trainor	Meghan Trainor; Johan Carlsson; Ross Golan; Justin Trainor	Thank You	2016	
"More than Friends"	Jason Mraz featuring Meghan Trainor	Jason Mraz; Meghan Trainor; Jonathan Green; Andrew Wells	Know.	2018	
"Mother"	Meghan Trainor	Meghan Trainor; Sean Douglas; Gian Stone; Justin Trainor; Pat Ballard	Takin' It Back	2023	
"Mr Right"	Mae Stephens and Meghan Trainor	Mae Stephens; Meghan Trainor; Jake Torrey; Jason Gill; Victor Rådström	Non-album single	2023	
"Mr. Almost"	Meghan Trainor featuring Shy Carter	Meghan Trainor; Jesse Frasure; Shy Carter	Title	2015	
"My Kind of Present"	Meghan Trainor	Meghan Trainor; Justin Trainor; Ryan Trainor	A Very Trainor Christmas	2020	
"My Only Wish" (cover)	Meghan Trainor	Brian Kierulf; Britney Spears; Josh Schwartz	A Very Trainor Christmas	2020	
"My Selfish Heart"	Meghan Trainor	Meghan Trainor ‡	Title	2015	
"Naughty List"	Meghan Trainor	Meghan Trainor; Justin Trainor; Ryan Trainor	A Very Trainor Christmas	2020	
"Never Ever"	Meghan Trainor	Meghan Trainor ‡	Only 17	2011	
"Nice to Meet Ya"	Meghan Trainor featuring Nicki Minaj	Meghan Trainor; Raul Cubina; Mark Williams; Scott Harris; Onika Maraj	Treat Myself	2020	
"No"	Meghan Trainor	Meghan Trainor; Eric Frederic; Jacob Kasher Hindlin	Thank You	2016	
"No Excuses"	Meghan Trainor	Meghan Trainor; Andrew Wells; Jacob Kasher Hindlin	Treat Myself	2018	
"No Good for You"	Meghan Trainor	Meghan Trainor; Brett James	Title	2015	
"No Matter What You Do"	Meghan Trainor	Meghan Trainor ‡	Meghan Trainor	2009	
"Normal" (cover)	Meghan Trainor	Sasha Sloan	Spotify Singles	2018	
"Ocean"	LunchMoney Lewis featuring Meghan Trainor	Gamal Lewis; Meghan Trainor; Marco Rodriguez	Non-album single	2021	
"One Chance"	Meghan Trainor	Meghan Trainor ‡	Meghan Trainor	2009	
"Out the Door"	Meghan Trainor	Meghan Trainor ‡	I'll Sing with You	2011	
"Overdrive"	Meghan Trainor	Meghan Trainor ‡	Meghan Trainor	2009	
"Painkiller"	Jason Derulo featuring Meghan Trainor	Jason Desrouleaux; Johan Carlsson; Ross Golan; Meghan Trainor	Everything is 4	2015	
"Pick Me Up"	Meghan Trainor	Meghan Trainor ‡	Only 17	2011	
"Pink Cadillac"	Meghan Trainor	Meghan Trainor; Grant Boutin; Sean Douglas	Toy with Me	2026	
"Potential"	Meghan Trainor	Meghan Trainor; Grant Boutin; Sean Douglas; Caroline Pennell	Toy with Me	2026	
"Princess"	Meghan Trainor	Meghan Trainor; Grant Boutin; Poo Bear; Mark Schick	Toy with Me	2026	
"Quite the Adventure"	Meghan Trainor	Meghan Trainor ‡	Meghan Trainor	2009	
"Rainbow"	Meghan Trainor	Meghan Trainor; Teddy Geiger; Andrew Haas; Ian Franzino	Takin' It Back	2022	
"Receipts"	Meghan Trainor	Meghan Trainor; Caroline Ailin; Sean Douglas; Ellis	Toy with Me	2026	
"Remember"	Meghan Trainor	Meghan Trainor ‡	I'll Sing with You	2011	
"Remind Me"	Meghan Trainor	Meghan Trainor; Maureen McDonald; Federico Vindver	Takin' It Back	2022	
"Rich Man"	Meghan Trainor	Meghan Trainor; Grant Boutin; Nicole "Kole" Cohen; Caroline Pennell	Toy with Me	2026	
"Rockin' Around the Christmas Tree" (cover)	Meghan Trainor	Johnny Marks	A Very Trainor Christmas	2021	
"Rollin'"	Meghan Trainor	Meghan Trainor; Jacob Kasher Hindlin; Federico Vindver	Timeless	2024	
"Rudolph the Red-Nosed Reindeer" (cover)	Meghan Trainor featuring Jayden Toney, Jenna Toney & Marcus Toney	Johnny Marks	A Very Trainor Christmas	2020	
"Run Like the River"	Meghan Trainor	Meghan Trainor; Andrew Wells; Jacob Kasher Hindlin	Playmobil: The Movie (Original Motion Picture Soundtrack)	2019	
"See You Smile"	Meghan Trainor	Meghan Trainor ‡	Meghan Trainor	2009	
"Sensitive"	Meghan Trainor featuring Scott Hoying	Meghan Trainor; Nicole Cohen; Toby Gad	Takin' It Back	2022	
"Shimmer"	Meghan Trainor	Meghan Trainor; Grant Boutin; Caroline Pennell; Gabe Yaron	Toy with Me	2026	
"Shook"	Meghan Trainor	Meghan Trainor; JustinTrainor; Ryan Trainor; Sean Douglas; Gian Stone	Takin' It Back	2022	
"Shoowap Shoowah"	Meghan Trainor featuring Gary Trainor	Meghan Trainor ‡	Only 17	2011	
"Silent Night" (cover)	Meghan Trainor	Franz Xaver Gruber; Joseph Mohr	A Very Trainor Christmas	2020	
"Simple Love"	Meghan Trainor	Meghan Trainor ‡	Meghan Trainor	2009	
"Single"	Meghan Trainor	Meghan Trainor ‡	Only 17	2011	
"Sleepin' on Me"	Meghan Trainor	Meghan Trainor; Scott Harris; Grant Boutin	Timeless	2024	
"Sleigh Ride" (cover)	Meghan Trainor	Leroy Anderson; Mitchell Parish	A Very Trainor Christmas	2020	
"Slippin'"	Paul Russell featuring Meghan Trainor	Paul Russell; Sean Cook; Riley McDonough; Connor McDonough; Castle	Again Sometime?	2024	
"Someday"	Michael Bublé featuring Meghan Trainor	Meghan Trainor; Harry Styles	Nobody but Me	2016	
"Something to Believe In"	Meghan Trainor	Meghan Trainor ‡	Only 17	2011	
"Special Delivery"	Meghan Trainor featuring Max	Meghan Trainor; Maxwell Schneider; Federico Vindver; Janée Bennett	Takin' It Back	2023	
"Stay with Me" (cover)	Meghan Trainor	Sam Smith; James Napier; William Phillips; Tom Petty; Jeff Lynne	Spotify Sessions	2015	
"Still Don't Care"	Meghan Trainor	Meghan Trainor; Caroline Ailin; Scott Harris; Steve Mac	Toy with Me	2026	
"Superwoman"	Meghan Trainor	Meghan Trainor; Daniel Dodd Wilson	Takin' It Back	2022	
"Sweet Morning Heat"	Meghan Trainor and Jimmy Fallon	Meghan Trainor; Jimmy Fallon; Jerry Seinfeld; Spike Feresten; Maxime Picard; Mark Ronson; Andrew Wyatt	Unfrosted (Soundtrack from the Netflix Film)	2024	
"Sweet, Sweetie Pie"	Meghan Trainor	Meghan Trainor ‡	I'll Sing with You	2011	
"Take Care of Our Soldiers"	Meghan Trainor	Meghan Trainor ‡	I'll Sing with You	2010	
"Take These Tears"	Meghan Trainor	Meghan Trainor ‡	Meghan Trainor	2009	
"Takin' It Back"	Meghan Trainor	Meghan Trainor; Justin Trainor; Ryan Trainor; Federico Vindver	Takin' It Back	2022	
"Thank You"	Meghan Trainor featuring R. City	Meghan Trainor; Stefan Johnson; Jordan Johnson; Marcus Lomax; Theron Thomas; Timothy Thomas; Oliver Peterhof; Jordan Federman	Thank You	2016	
"Theme Song"	Meghan Trainor	Meghan Trainor; Sean Douglas; Grant Boutin; Gabe Yaron	Toy with Me	2026	
"This Love"	Meghan Trainor	Meghan Trainor ‡	Only 17	2011	
"Throwback Love"	Meghan Trainor	Meghan Trainor; Kevin Kadish	Thank You	2016	
"Timeless"	Meghan Trainor	Meghan Trainor; Sean Douglas; Federico Vindver; Gian Stone	Timeless	2024	
"Title"	Meghan Trainor	Meghan Trainor; Kevin Kadish	Title	2015	
"To the Moon"	Meghan Trainor	Meghan Trainor; Jacob Kasher Hindlin; Federico Vindver	Timeless	2024	
"Toy with Me"	Meghan Trainor	Meghan Trainor; Justin Trainor; Ryan Trainor	Toy with Me	2026	
"Treat Myself"	Meghan Trainor	Meghan Trainor; Andrew Wells; Tobias Jesso Jr. Ryan Trainor	Treat Myself	2018	
"Tumble"	Meghan Trainor featuring Gary Trainor	Meghan Trainor ‡	Only 17	2011	
"Underwater"	Meghan Trainor featuring Dillon Francis	Meghan Trainor; Dillon Francis; James Rushent; Ryan Trainor	Treat Myself	2020	
"Walkashame"	Meghan Trainor	Meghan Trainor; Kevin Kadish	Title	2015	
"Want Me to Stay"	Meghan Trainor	Meghan Trainor ‡	Meghan Trainor	2009	
"Watch Me Do"	Meghan Trainor	Meghan Trainor; Eric Frederic; Jacob Kasher Hindlin; Gamal Lewis	Thank You	2016	
"Waterfalls"	Meghan Trainor	Meghan Trainor ‡	Meghan Trainor	2009	
"Wave"	Meghan Trainor featuring Mike Sabath	Meghan Trainor; Mike Sabath	Treat Myself	2019	
"What If I"	Meghan Trainor	Meghan Trainor; Kevin Kadish	Title	2015	
"When Did You Fall?"	Meghan Trainor	Meghan Trainor ‡	Only 17	2011	
"While You're Young"	Meghan Trainor	Meghan Trainor; Thomas Hull; Tyler Johnson	Takin' It Back	2022	
"Whisper"	Meghan Trainor	Meghan Trainor ‡	I'll Sing with You	2011	
"White Christmas" (cover)	Meghan Trainor	Irving Berlin	A Very Trainor Christmas	2018	
"Who I Wanna Be"	Meghan Trainor	Meghan Trainor; Jesse Frasure; Cedric Lindsey; James Small	Non-album single	2012	
"Whoops"	Meghan Trainor	Meghan Trainor; Sean Douglas; Gian Stone; Grant Boutin	Timeless	2024	
"Why'd You Have to Go?"	Meghan Trainor	Meghan Trainor ‡	I'll Sing with You	2011	
"Window"	Meghan Trainor	Meghan Trainor ‡	Only 17	2011	
"Winter Wonderland" (cover)	Meghan Trainor	Richard B. Smith	A Very Trainor Christmas	2020	
"With You"	Kaskade and Meghan Trainor	Finn Bjarnson; Richard Beynon; Robert Gerongco; Ryan Raddon; Samuel Gerongco; Sarah Aarons; Thomas Shaw	Non-album single	2019	
"Woman Up"	Meghan Trainor	Meghan Trainor; Eric Frederic; James G. Morales; Matthew Morales; Julio David Rodriguez; Taylor Parks; Nash Overstreet; Erika Nuri; Shane Stevens	Thank You	2016	
"Workin' on It"	Meghan Trainor featuring Lennon Stella and Sasha Sloan	Meghan Trainor; Lennon Stella; Alexandra Yatchenko; Henry Allen	Treat Myself	2019	
"Wrap Me Up"	Jimmy Fallon and Meghan Trainor	Jimmy Fallon; Meghan Trainor; Sean Douglas; Gian Stone	Non-album single	2023	
"You Don't Know Me"	Meghan Trainor	Meghan Trainor; Michael Pollack; Alex Schwartz; Joe Khajadourian	Treat Myself	2020	
"You Got the Best of Me"	Meghan Trainor	Meghan Trainor ‡	Meghan Trainor	2009	
