= Love Me More =

Love Me More may refer to:

- "Love Me More" (Sam Smith song), 2022
- "Love Me More" (Trippie Redd song), 2019
- "Love Me More", a 2017 song by Chase & Status featuring Emeli Sandé from Tribe
- "Love Me More", a 2011 song recorded by Meghan Trainor
- "Love Me More", a song by Mitski from the 2022 album Laurel Hell
