= Holidays (Meghan Trainor song) =

- Promotional poster for "Holidays"

Song by Meghan Trainor featuring Earth, Wind & Fire

from the album A Very Trainor Christmas
- Released: October 30, 2020
- Genre: Christmas
- Length: 2:45
- Label: Honest OG; Epic
- Songwriters: Meghan Trainor; Mike Sabath; Philip Bailey; Eddie Benjamin; Verdine White; Ralph Johnson
- Producer: Mike Sabath

Music video
- "Holidays" on YouTube

"Holidays" is a song by American singer-songwriter Meghan Trainor from her fourth major-label studio album and first Christmas album, A Very Trainor Christmas (2020), featuring musical group Earth, Wind & Fire. Trainor wrote the song with Philip Bailey, Eddie Benjamin, Verdine White, Ralph Johnson, and its producer, Mike Sabath. It became available as the album's fifth track on October 30, 2020, when it was released by Honest OG Recording and Epic Records. "Holidays" is influenced by several genres and incorporates trumpets, layered harmonies, and horn bleats in its production.

Music critics were positive about "Holidays" and compared it to Earth, Wind & Fire's signature sound, specifically their 1978 single "September". Commercially, the song debuted at number 10 on the Holiday Digital Song Sales chart and reached number 35 on Canada AC. Sarah McColgan directed its music video, in which Trainor sings with Earth, Wind & Fire on a decorated stage. They performed the song for NBC's Christmas in Rockefeller Center special, and Trainor sang it on television shows The Tonight Show Starring Jimmy Fallon and Today.

== Background ==
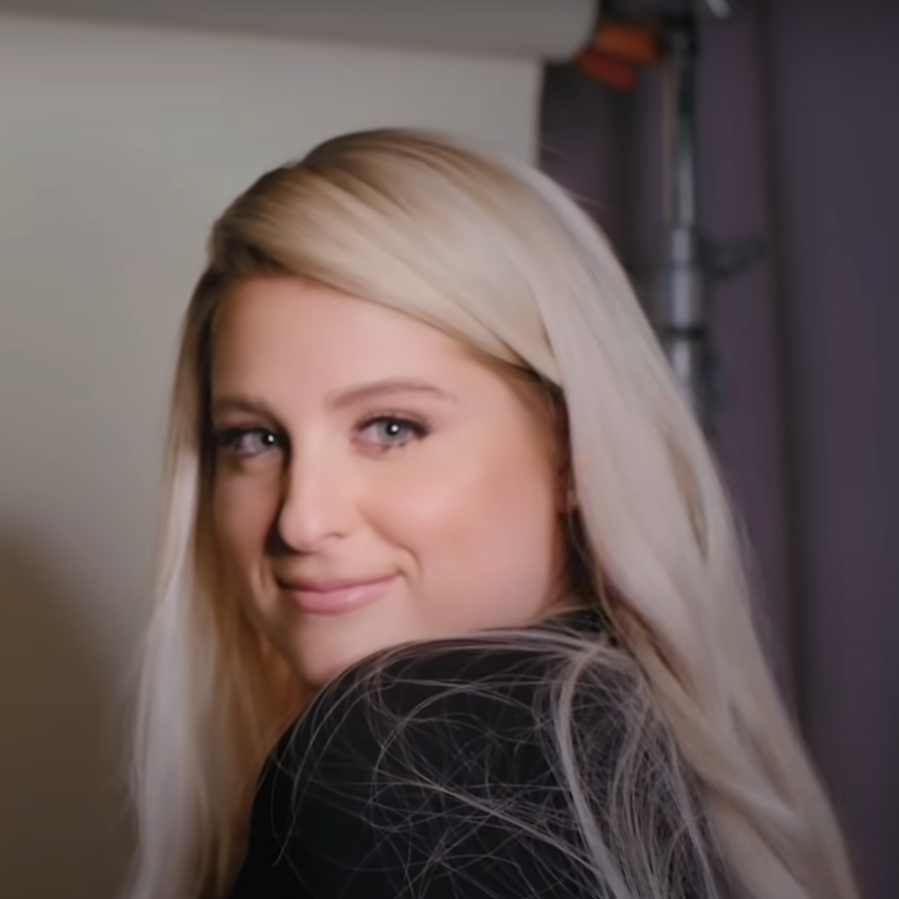
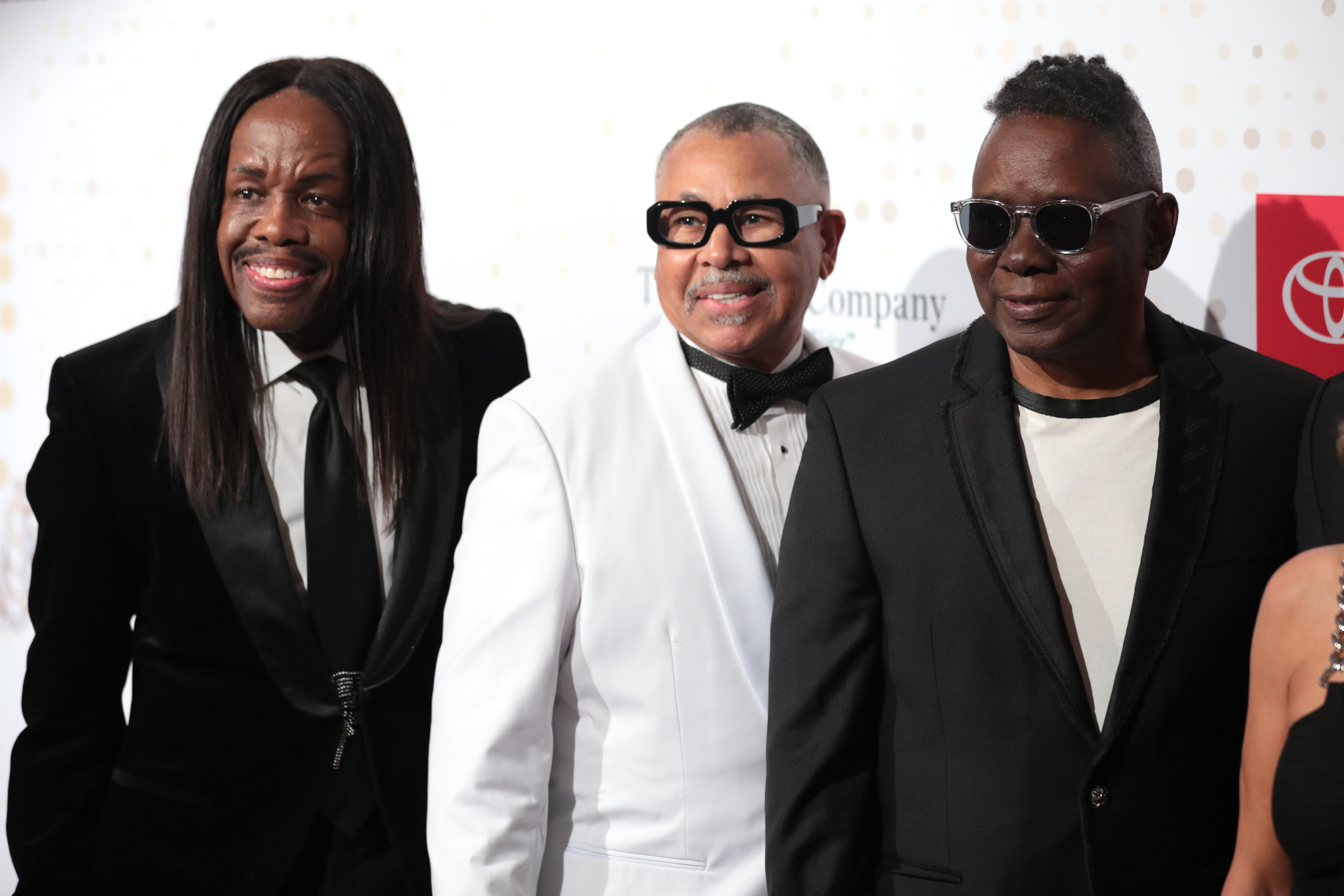
"Holidays" is a collaboration between Meghan Trainor (left) and Earth, Wind & Fire (right).

In January 2020, shortly before the release of Meghan Trainor's third major-label studio album, Treat Myself (2020), Billboard announced that she had started writing original Christmas songs, planning to release them later in the year. Three months into the COVID-19 lockdowns, she decided that it was the right time to complete her Christmas album. Trainor's intention with the project was to "spread some joy this year" in contrast to the gloom surrounding the world at the time. She recalled that most of the work for the album was done in July and August, when the weather was hot. Trainor pre-recorded two music videos and fifteen performances five months into her pregnancy, for later use. She wanted the album to feel like "a pop Christmas", something that could be played throughout the year, and decided to include original songs along with covers.

Trainor wrote "Holidays" with Earth, Wind & Fire members Philip Bailey, Verdine White, and Ralph Johnson, along with Eddie Benjamin, and its producer, Mike Sabath. In an appearance on The Kelly Clarkson Show, she announced that the soon-to-be-filmed music video for her Earth, Wind & Fire collaboration would be the first one shot during her pregnancy. In September 2020, Trainor announced the album title as A Very Trainor Christmas, and the following month she revealed the tracklist, which included "Holidays" as the fifth track. Trainor stated: "Earth, Wind & Fire [...] are [one] of my family's all-time favorites. We worship the ground they walk on, so to get them to feature on this album still doesn't feel real. Best Christmas present ever!" The song became available for digital download on A Very Trainor Christmas, which Honest OG Recording and Epic Records released on October 30.

== Composition ==
"Holidays" is 2 minutes and 45 seconds long. Sabath produced and programmed the song. He handled vocal production with Trainor and engineered it with her brother Justin. All three provided background vocals alongside Benjamin, Bailey, Daryl Sabara, Tristan Hurd, Maddie Ziegler, and Philip Doron Bailey. Instruments used in the song are guitar (performed by Benjamin and Morris O'Connor), percussion (Bailey and Johnson), bass (White), trumpet (Hurd), drums (John Paris), trumpet (Rashawn Ross and Will Artope), alto (Gary Bias), tenor saxophones (Bias), trombone (Reginald Young), and horns (Ray Brown). Serban Ghenea mixed the song, and Dale Becker mastered it.

"Holidays"
"Holidays" incorporates layered harmonies and horn bleats, along with influences of funk, R&B, and pop. Critics compared it to Earth, Wind & Fire's single "September".

"Holidays" is an uptempo song driven by trumpets, which incorporates layered harmonies and horn bleats. The song's musical style has been described as old-school and funky by the Associated Press's Mark Kennedy, and it demonstrates the links between "'70s R&B/pop and current-day pop" according to Allan Sculley of The Spokesman-Review.

The lyrics of "Holidays" are about celebrating the festive season and having a party. In the part sung by Earth, Wind & Fire members, they implore listeners to say that they are "rеady for the holiday" and call their families to inform them that they will be there soon. Trainor's lyrics include: "Tryna party 'cause we goin crazy / You can feel it, you can feel it". One of the lyrics repeated throughout the song is "It's a celebration / Get ready for the holi-, holi-, holidays". GQ's Olive Pometsey described it as "a festive boogie".

== Reception ==
Music critics compared "Holidays" to Earth, Wind & Fire's 1978 single "September" and viewed it as an embodiment of their signature sound. (Note: Cited to AllMusic, GQ, The Atlanta Journal-Constitution, and the University Press of Mississippi) Pometsey thought "Holidays" fused the sound of "September" with "Let's Groove" (1981) and was an apt way to conclude "2020's disco renaissance." Parade's Lauren Ash believed that the song successfully captured "the holiday spirit across decades" and was a good way for listeners to get into a joyous mood. Melissa Ruggieri of The Atlanta Journal-Constitution thought its quality justified Trainor's excitement about the collaboration. Commercially, "Holidays" reached number 35 on the Canada AC chart issue dated December 12, 2020, and debuted at number 10 on the Holiday Digital Song Sales chart issue dated November 14, 2020.

== Music video and promotion ==
Sarah McColgan directed the music video for "Holidays", which was released on November 24, 2020, following a live chat hosted by Trainor. Trainor was five and a half months pregnant when it was filmed. In the video, she appears with tiny gift bows on her face, and she wears a large ruby red bow over a black evening gown and a white winter dress. Trainor performs the song with Earth, Wind & Fire, dressed in shiny jackets, on a stage decorated with enormous ornaments, disco balls, toy troops, and dancers wearing matching red bows.

Trainor continued wearing bows during her live performances of "Holidays", including at The Tonight Show Starring Jimmy Fallon. She wore a sparkling bodysuit with a large green bow while reprising the song with Earth, Wind & Fire for NBC's Christmas in Rockefeller Center special, which aired on December 2, 2020. The bow was noticed by the public on social media; Today's Lindsay Lowe remarked that "oversized bows are quickly becoming a signature holiday accessory for [the] Grammy winner". That same day, Trainor performed the song on Today.

== Credits and personnel ==
Credits are adapted from the liner notes of A Very Trainor Christmas.

- Mike Sabath – producer, songwriter, vocal production, background vocals, programming, engineering
- Meghan Trainor – songwriter, lead vocals, background vocals, vocal production
- Eddie Benjamin – songwriter, guitar, background vocals
- Philip Bailey – songwriter, lead vocals, background vocals, percussion
- Verdine White – songwriter, bass
- Ralph Johnson – songwriter, percussion
- Justin Trainor – background vocals, engineering
- Daryl Sabara – background vocals
- Tristan Hurd – background vocals, trumpet
- Maddie Ziegler – background vocals
- Philip Doron Bailey – background vocals
- John Paris – drums
- Rashawn Ross – trumpet
- Will Artope – trumpet
- Gary Bias – alto saxophone, tenor saxophone
- Reginald Young – trombone
- Morris O'Connor – guitar
- Ray Brown – horns orchestration
- Kenny Moran – engineering
- Dale Becker – mastering
- Serban Ghenea – mixing

== Charts ==
Chart positions for "Holidays"
Chart (2020)	Peak position
Canada AC (Billboard)	35
Holiday Digital Song Sales (Billboard)	10
