= Title (album) =

Studio album by Meghan Trainor
- Released: January 9, 2015
- Recorded: c. 2013–2014
- Studios: The Carriage House (Nolensville, Tennessee); The Green Room (East Nashville, Tennessee); Germano Studios (New York City); Meghan Trainor's home studio (Nashville); Beluga Heights Studio (Los Angeles)
- Genres: Pop; doo-wop; blue-eyed soul; R&B
- Length: 32:27
- Label: Epic
- Producers: Kevin Kadish; Chris Gelbuda; Meghan Trainor; Justin Trainor; The Elev3n; J.R. Rotem

Meghan Trainor chronology
Title (2014)	Title (2015)	Thank You (2016)

Singles from Title
- 1. "All About That Bass" Released: June 30, 2014; 2. "Lips Are Movin" Released: October 21, 2014; 3. "Dear Future Husband" Released: March 17, 2015; 4. "Like I'm Gonna Lose You" Released: June 23, 2015

Title is the debut major-label studio album by the American singer-songwriter Meghan Trainor. It was released on January 9, 2015, by Epic Records. Initially a songwriter for other artists, in 2013, Trainor signed with the label the following year and began recording material she co-wrote with Kevin Kadish. Trainor and Kadish produced the album, alongside Trainor's brother Justin, Chris Gelbuda, The Elev3n, and J. R. Rotem. The album was recorded from 2013 to 2014 at multiple studios across the United States, and was preceded by her debut extended play of the same name in 2014.

Title is a doo-wop, pop, blue-eyed soul, and R&B record, with elements of Caribbean, hip hop, reggae, and soca music. Trainor and Kadish were dissatisfied with the electronic dance music predominant in contemporary hit radio and drew influence from retro-styled 1950s and 1960s music. Inspired by past relationships and her insecurities about body image, Trainor wrote songs she wished existed before she attended high school. The songs on the album explore themes such as female empowerment, self-respect, and self-awareness.

Trainor promoted the album with several public appearances and televised performances, including the That Bass Tour and the MTrain Tour in 2015. It was supported by four singles, including "All About That Bass" which reached number one in 58 countries and became the best-selling song by a female artist during the 2010s in the US. It also produced the Billboard Hot 100 top-15 singles "Lips Are Movin", "Dear Future Husband", and "Like I'm Gonna Lose You", the last of which features John Legend and peaked at number one in Australia, New Zealand, and Poland. The track "Bang Dem Sticks" was also released as a B-side to the Peanuts Movie soundtrack contribution "Better When I'm Dancin'". Reviewers criticized Title's repetitiveness and did not foresee a long-lasting career for Trainor, though some appreciated her wit and audacious attitude.

Title topped the album charts in Australia, Canada, New Zealand, Scotland, the United Kingdom, and the United States. It was Epic's first number-one album in the US since 2010, and in Australia since Michael Jackson's The Essential Michael Jackson in 2005. Title made Trainor the fifth female artist in history to send her debut single and album to number one and follow-up single to the top five in the US. It was the ninth-best-selling album of 2015 worldwide, and earned multi-platinum certifications in Australia, Brazil, Canada, Denmark, New Zealand, and Poland, and the United States. The album also won in the Favorite Album category at the 42nd People's Choice Awards in 2016, and was also nominated in the International Album of the Year category at the Juno Awards of 2016.

== Background ==
Meghan Trainor developed an early interest in music and started singing at age six. She began performing her compositions and soca music as part of the cover band Island Fusion, which included her aunt, younger brother, and father. Trainor temporarily relocated to Orleans, Massachusetts, with her family when she was in eighth grade, before moving to North Eastham, Massachusetts. She attended Nauset Regional High School, where she studied guitar, played trumpet, and sang in a jazz band for three years. When Trainor was a teenager, her parents nudged her to attend songwriting conventions and took her to venues at which production companies were searching for new artists and songwriters. She used Logic Studio to record and produce her compositions and later worked independently in a home studio built by her parents.

Trainor independently released three albums of material she had written, recorded, performed, and produced, between the ages 15 and 17. These included her eponymous 2009 release, and 2011 albums I'll Sing with You and Only 17. Trainor introduced herself to former NRBQ member Al Anderson at a music conference in Nashville. Impressed by her songwriting, he referred her to his publisher Carla Wallace of music publishing firm Big Yellow Dog Music. Though Trainor had been offered a scholarship at the Berklee College of Music, she decided to pursue her songwriting career and signed with Big Yellow Dog in 2012. Her ability to compose in a variety of genres influenced this decision. Trainor was unsure about becoming a recording artist herself; her father recalled: "She thought she was one of the chubby girls who would never be an artist."

== Recording and production ==
Trainor found songwriting affinity with American songwriter Kevin Kadish, whom she met in June 2013, due to their mutual love of pop music from the 1950s and 1960s. Kadish wished to create a "'50s sounding record of doo-wop-inspired pop" for three years, but could not find any artist that was interested. He shared the idea with Trainor after the two bonded over Jimmy Soul's 1963 single "If You Wanna Be Happy", and they decided to create the extended play (EP) Title (2014) with the same sound, "just for fun". They wrote the song "All About That Bass" (2014) in July 2013, and had completed three songs before Kadish started producing a rock album for the rest of the year. Trainor and Kadish pitched it to several record labels, who said it would not be successful because of its retro-styled composition and wanted to rerecord it using synthesizers, which they refused. Trainor performed the song on a ukulele for L.A. Reid, the chairman of Epic Records, who signed her with the label 20 minutes later.

Trainor immediately began working on more songs with Kadish as Epic wanted her to record an entire album. The label briefly suggested that Trainor work with other producers, such as Pharrell Williams or Timbaland, but she insisted on continuing with Kadish. Her artists and repertoire called Kadish and said, "whatever you did on 'Bass,' do it 10 more times. Don't bring in any more writers. Don't bring in any other producers. Whoever you used on that song." While recording Title, Trainor took a two-month break because polyps were developing on her vocal cords. She recounted that Kadish would "calm [her] down, [they would] dim the lights, so [she] wouldn't get frustrated", and had to use demo vocal takes Trainor had recorded as guides. Some of the album's material was recorded while Trainor lay on a bed Kadish made in the studio. In September 2014, she told Billboard that it was "pretty much done" and she only had one more song left to realize. Following the initial completion of Title, Trainor and Kadish had an additional day to work together and went into the studio. They wrote the song "Lips Are Movin" (2014) within eight minutes. Trainor told USA Today in mid-August, "It was done until we wrote this smash in eight minutes, literally. I calculated it: eight minutes. We were like, we have to add this now."

Trainor wrote "Like I'm Gonna Lose You" (2015) with fellow songwriters Justin Weaver and Caitlyn Smith while working in Music Row, and intended to pitch it to Kelly Clarkson. Initially reluctant to include it on the album, her manager and uncle convinced her otherwise. Title's sound was inspired by Trainor's love of throwback-style records, and music from the 1950s and 1960s. She wanted to continue the doo-wop vibe of the album's preceding singles, and simultaneously showcase influences of Caribbean music, rapping, and Fugees. Trainor considered it distinctive and disparate from popular music at the time: "it's got the throwback in there, but I snuck some reggae in there and clever fun lyrics and catchy melodies". According to her, the writing on Title reflects on the changes in her life and artistic process. Trainor intended the album to be a source of empowerment for young people; she wished some of its songs existed before she attended high school. She gravitated towards discussing unemployed men she had dated in the past, who made her pay for them and only texted her instead of taking her out. When Time's Nolan Feeney asked Trainor what she wanted listeners to hear on it, she said, "I want to help myself. I want to make sure guys take me on a date and treat me right because I didn't do that in the past. I want to love my body more. I just hope younger girls love themselves more, and younger people in general."

== Composition ==
=== Overview ===
The standard edition of Title includes 11 tracks; the deluxe edition contains four additional songs. The album predominantly has a doo-wop, pop, blue-eyed soul, and R&B sound. Kadish and Trainor drew from their mutual interest in retro-styled music, as they were tired of penning hackneyed electronic dance music catered to contemporary hit radio's tastes. AllMusic's Stephen Thomas Erlewine thought it balanced old-fashioned girl-group pop and old-school hip hop. Title comprises three-part harmonies, handclaps, finger-clicks, acoustic bass guitar, bubblegum pop melodies, and reggae and soca riddims. According to Jim Farber of the New York Daily News, the album's Caribbean music tracks were inspired by Trainor's Tobago-born uncle, and Millie Small's song "My Boy Lollipop" (1964). He wrote that it roots itself in the same style as "All About That Bass" and "Lips Are Movin", and recalls "girl groups in all their glory".

Trainor performed Title reminiscent of musical theatre style, and combined rap verses with cabaret choruses. Chuck Arnold of Rolling Stone described her vocals as "torch-y" and "tangy", reminiscent of Amy Winehouse. The album has lyrics about contemporary female empowerment, self-respect, and self-awareness. It uses themes of contradiction, such as individual versus society, modernity versus tradition, and dependence versus independence. Writing for The Seattle Times, Paul de Barros noted that Title focuses on adult themes, and Trainor occasionally employs profanity on it. According to Boston's Bryanna Cappadona, she portrays a "bossy, egocentric and sexually candid" personality on the album. Helen Brown of The Daily Telegraph remarked that "Trainor tackles 'complicated' relationships and drunken one-night stands with perma-perkiness" on it, while Tshepo Mokoena of The Guardian wrote it proved that Trainor is not a feminist.

=== Songs ===
Trainor's love of songwriting inspired the 24-second interlude "The Best Part", which Billboard's Carl Wilson compared to the 1954 song "Mr. Sandman". "All About That Bass", a bubblegum pop, doo-wop, hip hop, Italo-Latin soul, and retro-R&B pop song, encourages embracing inner beauty, and promotes positive body image and self-acceptance. Trainor stated that "Dear Future Husband" was inspired by doo-wop standards like Dion's "Runaround Sue" (1961), and Beach Boys songs that possess big choruses with intentionally low-pitched melodies; its lyrics are about chivalry and dating, and list the things a man needs to do to be Trainor's life partner. "Close Your Eyes" is a contemporary ballad on which Trainor gives a soulful and "nuanced, fluttery vocal performance" over an acoustic guitar and pitch-shifted background vocals. The song features lyrics about Trainor's body image insecurities. "3am" is a "quieter and more vulnerable" song, on which Trainor succumbs to an ex-boyfriend and drunk dials him.

"Title"
Trainor viewed the Caribbean drum before the title track's chorus and its rap bridge as new territory for her.

The soul ballad "Like I'm Gonna Lose You" features guest vocals from John Legend. In the song's lyrics, Trainor parlays her fear of losing a loved one into determination to relish and savor every moment spent with them. "Bang Dem Sticks" is a raucous, suggestive, and thematically ribald song, about her attraction to drummers. It has a simple percussion rhythm, horn and drum instrumentation, and a patois-inflected rap verse from Trainor. On "Walkashame", she details a hangover, and expresses embarrassment while defending someone returning home nonchalantly after an unintended one-night stand. Trainor wrote the title track and "Dear Future Husband" as a reaction to issues with contemporary dating and hookup culture, like women basing their self worth on social media likes and whether their partner replied to their texts. The former is a doo-wop song with Caribbean music influences and a ska-inflected bridge, on which she refuses to be friends with benefits and pushes her partner to define their relationship more clearly.

The penultimate track of the standard edition is "What If I", a 1950s-style ballad with string instrumentation, which contemplates the dangers of first-date sex and is lyrically reminiscent of The Shirelles's 1960 single "Will You Still Love Me Tomorrow". The final track, "Lips Are Movin", is a bubblegum pop, doo-wop, and Motown bounce song, with lyrics inspired by Trainor's frustrations with her record label. Reviewers including The Tennessean's Dave Paulson and MTV News' Christina Garibaldi deemed it a song about leaving a significant other after being cheated on, an interpretation Kadish is open to. It received widespread comparisons to "All About That Bass" from critics; Trainor admitted they "followed the [same] formula". "No Good for You", the first of the four bonus songs on the deluxe edition, contains elements of ska, with Trainor offering her opinion about a troublesome man in its lyrics. "Mr. Almost" and "My Selfish Heart" are about being in an unhealthy romantic relationship. In "Credit", Trainor demands credit from her ex-boyfriend's new partner, for the positive qualities and habits he developed during his time with her. "I'll Be Home", a seasonal ballad, appears on the Japanese and special editions of the album. The 10th Anniversary edition adds "Better When I'm Dancin'" and its J.bird Timeless Tour version, a re-recording of "All About That Bass", and six live recordings that were previously released on the EP Spotify Sessions.

== Release and promotion ==
Trainor marketed Title as her debut studio album, having pulled her earlier independent albums from circulation in the build-up to its release. Upon his first meeting with Trainor, Reid thought she had "lightning in a bottle" with "All About That Bass" and "was going to explode", but was unsure about what her next step should be: "All I knew is that I had one in my hand, I didn't even think about what would come behind it." Trainor felt pressured to retain her look from the song's music video after it gained popularity. In March 2015, she partnered with plus-size retailer FullBeauty Brands as a consultant for the creation of clothing for women with varying body types. Trainor's 2014 EP of the same name, which included "All About That Bass", "Dear Future Husband", "Close Your Eyes", and the title track, was released on September 9, 2014. Epic announced Title's release date in October 2014, and replaced the EP with its pre-order. The album's standard and deluxe editions were released digitally on January 9, 2015. Its special edition, consisting of music videos and behind-the-scenes footage, was released on November 20, 2015. The 10th Anniversary edition was released on March 28, 2025.

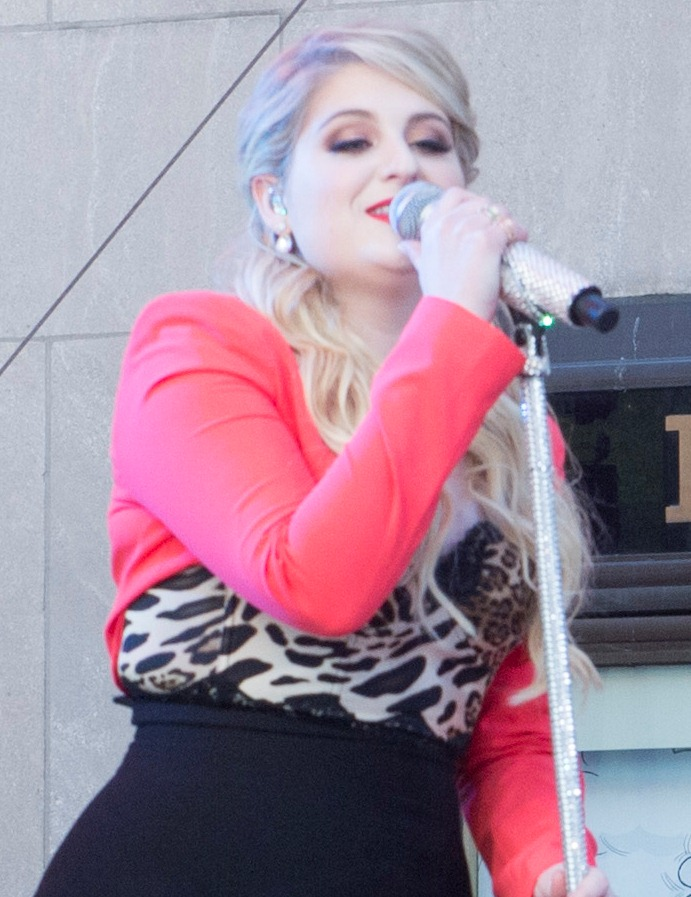
Trainor performing on Today in 2015

Title was supported by several singles. The lead single, "All About That Bass" reached number one in 58 countries and sold 11 million units worldwide. According to the 2019 Nielsen Music year-end report, it was the best-selling song by a female artist during the 2010s, with 5.8 million digital downloads sold in the US. (Note: A 2015 Billboard article contradicts this claim and reported the sales of Adele's songs "Rolling in the Deep" (2010) and "Someone like You" (2011) as 8.4 and 6 million, respectively.) The lyrics caused controversy; some critics called the song anti-feminist and accused Trainor of body shaming thin women. It was nominated for Record of the Year and Song of the Year at the 57th Annual Grammy Awards. The follow-up singles "Lips Are Movin" and "Dear Future Husband" reached the top 15 on the US Billboard Hot 100. The latter's music video was criticized over allegations of antifeminism, sexism and perpetuation of gender stereotypes. "Like I'm Gonna Lose You" was released as the fourth single, and reached number one in Australia, New Zealand, and Poland.

Trainor promoted Title with a series of public appearances and televised live performances. She performed at award shows, including the Country Music Association Awards, iHeartRadio Music Awards, Billboard Music Awards, and the American Music Awards. Trainor's appearances on television talk shows included The Tonight Show Starring Jimmy Fallon, The Ellen DeGeneres Show, Today, and Jimmy Kimmel Live!. She was part of the line-up for the Jingle Ball Tour and Today's Toyota Concert Series. The album was supported by two concert tours, That Bass Tour and MTrain Tour. The former began in Vancouver, British Columbia, in February 2015, and concluded in Milan in June 2015. Sheppard served as the opening act. The MTrain Tour commenced in St. Louis the following month, supported by Charlie Puth and British band Life of Dillon. Its remainder was canceled on August 11, 2015, after Trainor suffered a vocal cord hemorrhage.

== Critical reception ==
Professional ratings
Aggregate scores
Source	Rating
AnyDecentMusic?	5.0/10
Metacritic	59/100
Review scores
Source	Rating
AllMusic	3.5/5 stars
Billboard	3/5 stars
The Daily Telegraph	3/5 stars
Entertainment Weekly	A−
The Guardian	2/5 stars
New York Daily News	3/5 stars
The Observer	3/5 stars
Rolling Stone	3/5 stars
Slant Magazine	2.5/5 stars
Spin	4/10

Title received mixed reviews from music critics. At Metacritic, which assigns a weighted mean rating out of 100 to reviews from mainstream critics, the album received an average score of 59, based on 13 reviews. Entertainment Weekly's Melissa Maerz characterized it as "real-girl pop with massive charm" and said it will help Trainor project multi-generational appeal. Arnold thought Title is "charmingly old-fashioned" and commended Trainor for co-writing each of its tracks. Farber complimented her vocals and wit-laden style of songwriting but thought the album "crosses the line from confident to smug", and noted her self-harmonizing as emblematic of its "[emphasis on] the image of self-containment". Brown described it as "relentlessly cute" and a showcase of "plenty of wit and watertight tunes", but advised Trainor to "read more self-help than she spouts".

Title's repetitiveness drew criticism. Marc Hirsh of The Boston Globe considered the album "more of the same" as "All About That Bass" and censured Trainor for pillaging herself, but was positive of its sassy attitude and catchiness. Writing for the Los Angeles Times, Mikael Wood opined that it "offers a dozen variations" of her debut single and derided its opposing themes as "unexamined", accusing her of appropriating the vocal patterns of black artists. Wilson stated that though Title sends the right message to Trainor's young audience, it gets dreary.

Some reviewers thought Title signaled Trainor's unsustainable commercial success. Slant Magazine's Alexa Camp believed that her retro style is untenable and anticipated a commercial decline reminiscent of Duffy, as she lacked Winehouse's "raw emotive talent" and ability to infuse a retro sound with "distinctly 21st-century sonic and lyrical sophistication". Dan Weiss of Spin stated he would be pleased if the album became "a gateway for body-conscious adolescents", but thought it was indicative that Trainor lacks endurance: "If she was actually as clever as her press release and titled the album It Girl With Staying Power, she might actually have staying power". Wilson noted that aside from her "understandable naïveté", her foibles are "stylistic cherry-picking" and a "compulsion to appear adorably relatable and socially correct", which she would be wise to eschew for a long-lasting career. Mokoena said it is "full of lyrical contradictions" and warned listeners not to expect "insightful and intimate songwriting". Erlewine opined that though Title was marred by "echoes" of "All About That Bass", it proved Trainor is smart enough to channel "a big hit into a real career".

== Commercial performance ==
In the US, Title debuted at number one on the Billboard 200 issued for January 31, 2015, with 238,000 album-equivalent units during its first week, replacing Taylor Swift's 1989 at the top of the chart. Trainor became the first female artist to top the chart with her debut album since Ariana Grande's 2013 release Yours Truly. Keith Caufield of Billboard wrote that its debut-week tally included 195,000 in pure sales and that it was "an impressive figure, considering January is traditionally a sleepy month for big new releases". Title made her the fifth female artist in history to send her debut single and album to number one and follow-up single to the top five in the country. The album also entered at number one on the Canadian Albums Chart.

Title opened atop the Australian Albums Chart issued for January 25, Epic's first album to do so since Michael Jackson's The Essential Michael Jackson (2005). The album spent two weeks at the summit. It debuted atop the New Zealand Albums Chart on January 19, spending two consecutive weeks there. Title entered at number one on the Scottish Albums Chart and UK Albums Chart. It achieved success in Europe, where it peaked within the top 10 in Denmark, Norway, Spain, Sweden, and Switzerland. Several songs from it entered charts worldwide despite not being released as singles. The title track reached the 100th position on the Billboard Hot 100, and number nine in New Zealand. It was certified Gold in both countries. "No Good for You" debuted and peaked at number 91 on the Swedish Singles Chart, where it charted for two weeks.

Title received certifications, including 5× Platinum in Canada; 3× Platinum in the US and Australia; 2× Platinum in Mexico and Poland; Platinum in Denmark, New Zealand, Sweden, and the UK; and Gold in the Netherlands. According to the International Federation of the Phonographic Industry (IFPI), it was the ninth-best-selling album of 2015, with 1.8 million copies sold worldwide.

== Track listing ==
All tracks are written by Meghan Trainor and Kevin Kadish, except where noted. All tracks are produced by Kadish, except 5 by Chris Gelbuda, 6 by Meghan Trainor and Gelbuda, 7 by Meghan Trainor and The Elev3n, 12 by J.R. Rotem, "Good to Be Alive" by Meghan Trainor and Justin Trainor, and "I'll Be Home" by Meghan Trainor.

Title – standard edition
No.	Title	Length
1.	"The Best Part" (M. Trainor)	0:24
2.	"All About That Bass"	3:07
3.	"Dear Future Husband"	3:04
4.	"Close Your Eyes"	3:41
5.	"3am" (M. Trainor, Gelbuda, Todd Carey, Ben Fagan, Karen Thornton)	3:06
6.	"Like I'm Gonna Lose You" (featuring John Legend; M. Trainor, Justin Weaver, Caitlyn Smith)	3:45
7.	"Bang Dem Sticks" (M. Trainor, James G. Morales, Matthew Morales, Julio David Rodriguez)	3:00
8.	"Walkashame"	2:59
9.	"Title"	2:55
10.	"What If I"	3:20
11.	"Lips Are Movin"	3:02
Total length:		32:27

Title – Deluxe edition (bonus tracks)
No.	Title	Length
12.	"No Good for You" (M. Trainor, Brett James)	3:36
13.	"Mr. Almost" (featuring Shy Carter; M. Trainor, Jesse Frasure, Carter)	3:16
14.	"My Selfish Heart" (M. Trainor)	3:47
15.	"Credit"	2:51
Total length:		45:57

Title – Japan edition (bonus tracks)
No.	Title	Length
16.	"I'll Be Home" (M. Trainor)	3:39
17.	"All About That Bass" (instrumental)	3:08
18.	"Title" (instrumental)	2:53
Total length:		55:37

Title – Special edition (bonus tracks)
No.	Title	Length
16.	"Good to Be Alive" (M. Trainor, R. Trainor) (physical exclusive bonus)	3:47
17.	"What If I" (guitar version)	3:18
18.	"Title" (acoustic)	2:55
19.	"I'll Be Home" (M. Trainor)	3:39
Total length:		59:37

Title – Special edition (bonus DVD)
No.	Title	Director(s)	Length
19.	"Title" (music video)	Anthony Phan	2:55
20.	"All About That Bass" (music video)	Fatima Robinson	3:10
21.	"Behind the Scenes of 'All About That Bass'"		2:08
22.	"Dear Future Husband" (music video)	Robinson	3:21
23.	"Behind the Scenes of 'Dear Future Husband'"		1:56
24.	"Like I'm Gonna Lose You" (music video)	Constellation Jones	3:47
25.	"Behind the Scenes of 'Like I'm Gonna Lose You'"		3:41

Title – 10th anniversary edition (bonus tracks)
No.	Title	Length
16.	"Better When I'm Dancin' (From The Peanuts Movie)" (M. Trainor, Thaddeus Dixon)	2:56
17.	"Good to Be Alive (From The Peanuts Movie)" (M. Trainor, R. Trainor)	3:47
18.	"What If I" (guitar version)	3:18
19.	"Title" (acoustic)	2:55
20.	"I'll Be Home" (M. Trainor)	3:39
21.	"All About That Bass" (remastered)	3:08
22.	"Better When I'm Dancin'" (J.bird Timeless Tour version)	3:07
23.	"Lips Are Movin" (live from Spotify London)	3:15
24.	"Title" (live from Spotify London)	3:26
25.	"Stay with Me^{[b]}" (live from Spotify London; Sam Smith, James Napier, William Phillips, Tom Petty, Jeff Lynne)	3:14
26.	"Don't Stop^{[b]}" (live from Spotify London; Steve Robson, Busbee, Luke Hemmings, Calum Hood)	2:51
27.	"All About That Bass" (live from Spotify London)	2:51
28.	"Can't Help Falling in Love^{[b]}" (live from Spotify London; Hugo Peretti, Luigi Creatore, George David Weiss)	2:43

=== Notes ===
- ^{^[a]} signifies a vocal producer
- ^{^[b]} Does not appear on the tenth anniversary edition CD pressings.

== Credits and personnel ==
Credits are adapted from the liner notes of Title.

=== Recording locations ===
- Recorded and engineered at The Carriage House (Nolensville, Tennessee) (tracks 1–4, 8–11, and 13–15), The Green Room (East Nashville, Tennessee) (tracks 5 and 6), Germano Studios (New York City) (track 6), Meghan Trainor's home studio (Nashville) (track 7), and Beluga Heights Studio (Los Angeles) (track 12)
- Mixed at The Carriage House (Nolensville, Tennessee) (tracks 1–4, 8–11, and 13–15), Larrabee North Studios (Universal City, California) (tracks 5–7), and Beluga Heights Studio (Los Angeles) (track 12)
- Mastered at The Mastering Palace (New York City)
- Management – Atom Factory, a division of Coalition Media Group (Los Angeles)
- Legal – Myman Greenspan Fineman/Fox Rosenberg & Light LLP

=== Personnel ===
- Meghan Trainor – vocals, additional drum programming, background vocals, executive producer, guitar, handclaps, piano, production, programming, recording, ukulele, vocal production
- Kevin Kadish – vocals, acoustic guitar, background vocals, bass, bass vocals, classical guitar, drum programming, drums, electric guitar, electric upright bass, engineering, mixing, organ, piano, production, sound design, synthesizer, ukulele, vibraslap (tracks 1–4, 8–11, and 13–15)
- David Baron – baritone saxophone, bass, celesta, clavinet, electric piano, French horn, Hammond organ, piano, strings, synthesizer, tenor saxophone (tracks 2–4, 8–11, and 13–15)
- Jim Hoke – baritone saxophone, flute, tenor saxophone (tracks 3, 8, 10, and 13)
- Jeremy Lister – background vocals (track 4)
- Eleonore Denig – violin (track 10)
- Shannon Forrest – drums (track 10)
- Shy Carter – vocals
- Chris Gelbuda – additional background vocals, instruments, recording, production, programming,
- John Legend – vocals (track 6)
- Jason Agel – recording (track 6)
- Kenta Yonesaka – recording assistant (track 6)
- The Elev3n – production,
- Manny Marroquin – mixing (tracks 5–7)
- J.R. Rotem – bass, drums, horns, organ, piano, production, strings (track 12)
- Samuel Kalandjian – engineering, mixing, recording (track 12)
- Dave Kutch – mastering
- Anita Marisa Boriboon – art director, design
- Lana Jay Lackey – styling
- Danilo – hair
- Mylah Morales – make-up
- Brooke Nipar – photography

== Charts ==
=== Weekly charts ===
Weekly chart positions for Title
Chart (2015)	Peak position
Australian Albums (ARIA)	1
Austrian Albums (Ö3 Austria)	13
Belgian Albums (Ultratop Flanders)	55
Belgian Albums (Ultratop Wallonia)	57
Canadian Albums (Billboard)	1
Danish Albums (Hitlisten)	10
Dutch Albums (Album Top 100)	16
Finnish Albums (Suomen virallinen lista)	13
French Albums (SNEP)	30
German Albums (Offizielle Top 100)	14
Greek Albums (IFPI)	14
Hungarian Albums (MAHASZ)	40
Irish Albums (IRMA)	4
Italian Albums (FIMI)	53
Japan (Oricon)	58
New Zealand Albums (RMNZ)	1
Norwegian Albums (VG-lista)	8
Portuguese Albums (AFP)	27
Scottish Albums (Official Charts)	1
South African Albums (RiSA)	15
Spanish Albums (Promusicae)	4
Swedish Albums (Sverigetopplistan)	5
Swiss Albums (Schweizer Hitparade)	2
UK Albums (Official Charts)	1
US Billboard 200	1
US Indie Store Album Sales (Billboard)	2

=== Year-end charts ===
Year-end chart positions for Title
Chart (2015)	Position
Australian Albums (ARIA)	5
Canadian Albums (Billboard)	28
Danish Albums (Hitlisten)	33
German Albums (Official German Charts)	96
New Zealand Albums (RMNZ)	9
Spanish Albums (PROMUSICAE)	60
Swedish Albums (Sverigetopplistan)	19
Swiss Albums (Swiss Hitparade)	78
UK Albums (OCC)	17
US Billboard 200	5
Worldwide Albums (IFPI Global Music Report)	9
Chart (2016)	Position
Australian Albums (ARIA)	40
Canadian Albums (Billboard)	39
Danish Albums (Hitlisten)	68
New Zealand Albums (RMNZ)	41
US Billboard 200	40

=== Decade-end charts ===
Decade-end chart positions for Title
Chart (2010–2019)	Position
Australian Albums (ARIA)	54
US Billboard 200	67

== Certifications ==
Certifications for Title
Region	Certification	Certified units/sales
Australia (ARIA)	3× Platinum	210,000^{‡}
Brazil (Pro-Música Brasil)	2× Platinum	80,000^{‡}
Canada (Music Canada)	5× Platinum	400,000^{‡}
Denmark (IFPI Danmark)	2× Platinum	40,000^{‡}
Germany (BVMI)	Gold	100,000^{‡}
Mexico (AMPROFON)	2× Platinum	120,000^{‡}
Netherlands (NVPI)	Gold	25,000^{^}
New Zealand (RMNZ)	5× Platinum	75,000^{‡}
Poland (ZPAV)	2× Platinum	40,000^{‡}
Sweden (GLF)	Platinum	40,000^{‡}
United Kingdom (BPI)	Platinum	300,000^{‡}
United States (RIAA)	3× Platinum	3,000,000^{‡}
^{^} Shipments figures based on certification alone.^{‡} Sales+streaming figures based on certification alone.

== Release history ==
Release dates and format(s) for Title
Region	Date	Format	Edition(s)	Label	Ref.
Australia	January 9, 2015	CD	Deluxe	Epic	
Germany	January 9, 2015	CD	Standard; deluxe	Epic	
Ireland	January 9, 2015	Digital download	Standard; deluxe	Epic	
United Kingdom	January 9, 2015	Digital download	Standard; deluxe	Epic	
United States	January 9, 2015	Digital download	Standard; deluxe	Epic	
Australia	January 13, 2015	CD	Standard	Epic	
Germany	January 13, 2015	LP	Standard	Epic	
United States	January 13, 2015	CD; LP	Standard	Epic	
Germany	March 4, 2015	CD	Japan	Sony	
Germany	November 20, 2015	CD	Special	Sony	
Australia	December 4, 2015	CD	Special	Epic	
Various	March 28, 2025	CD; digital download; LP	10th Anniversary	Epic	

== See also ==
- List of Billboard 200 number-one albums of 2015
- List of number-one albums from the 2010s (New Zealand)
- List of number-one albums of 2015 (Australia)
- List of number-one albums of 2015 (Canada)
- List of UK Albums Chart number ones of the 2010s
