= The Elev3n =

THE ELEV3N
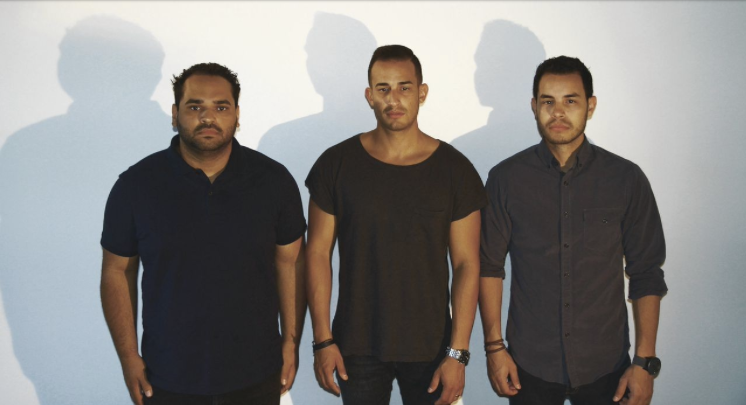

Background information
- Born: New York City, United States
- Genres: Pop; R&B; rock
- Occupations: Musician; record producer; songwriter
- Instruments: Keyboards, drums, guitar, bass, trumpet, saxophone
- Years active: 2011–present
- Label: Various
- Members: Dave Rodriguez; James Morales; Matt Morales

THE ELEV3N is an American production, songwriting and multi-instrumentalist team currently based in New York City, consisting of members James G. Morales, Matt Morales, and Dave Rodriguez. Since forming in 2011, the trio has achieved success in production and songwriting for pop, hip hop and R&B acts such as Meghan Trainor, Karmin, Sean Kingston, Cher Lloyd, Jesse McCartney, Bea Miller and the Wanted.

== Career ==
With all three members born and raised into the New York City music scene they each gained experience as multi-instrumentalists Dave (guitar, bass, keyboards) Matt (trumpet, keyboards) James (drums, keyboards, alto saxophone) at church and for various local bands. After graduating from Glen Cove High school where brothers James and Matt took up music playing for the school band they attended Berklee College of Music on scholarship to study Music Production & Engineering and Music Business. Dave attended Seton Hall and pursued a career as a live musician supporting various artists domestically and overseas and as a guitarist for Estelle.

While at Berklee James caught the attention of producer Rodney “Darkchild” Jerkins and went on to work at his studio compound in Atlantic City, NJ after graduating in 2006. A few years later, Matt returned to New York after graduating from Berklee in 2009 to engineer sessions for various record labels and artists such as Melanie Fiona, Tinashe, Jack Antonoff from the band FUN. In 2011 the trio collectively decided to join forces to work on songwriting and music production as THE ELEV3N.

After reconnecting with former Berklee classmate and friend Nils Gums of The Complex Group in 2012, the team entered into a management agreement with the Complex Group and landed a production deal with Antonio L.A. Reid CEO of Epic Records in addition to a publishing agreement with the world's leading music publisher, Sony/ATV.

THE ELEV3N have had several media and publication features by Billboard Magazine, MTV, CNN, CBS, and work actively between their studio in Manhattan NY, and Los Angeles, CA.

== Partial discography ==
- Sean Kingston feat. Cher Lloyd – "Rum & Raybans" – Single: Writer, producer, musician
- Karmin – Pulses (Epic Records / Sony Music Entertainment)
  - "Hate 2 Love You": Writer, producer, musician
  - "Geronimo": Writer, producer, musician
  - "What's in It For Me": Writer, producer, musician
- Los 5 – "Mexico" – Single: Writer, producer, musician
- Meghan Trainor – Title
  - "Bang Dem Sticks": Writer, producer, musician
- Bea Miller – Not an Apology
  - "Paper Doll": Writer, producer, musician
- Jesse McCartney – In Technicolor LP 2014: Album producers
  - "In Technicolor": Writer, producer, musician
  - "Back Together" – Single: Writer, producer, musician
  - "Young Love": Writer, producer, musician
  - "Superbad" – Single: Writer, producer, musician
  - "All About Us": Writer, producer, musician
  - "Goodie Bag": Writer, producer, musician
  - "In Technicolor, Pt. II": Writer, producer, musician
  - "Tie the Knot": Writer, producer, musician
  - "The Other Guy": Writer, producer, musician
- Meghan Trainor – Thank You
  - "Kindly Calm Me Down": Writer, producer, musician
  - "Woman Up": Writer, producer, musician
- Ashley Roberts – Butterfly Effect
  - "Woman Up" – Single: Writer, producer, musician
- Steve Grand – All American Boy
  - "Soakin' Wet": Writer, producer, musician
- Fifth Harmony – TBD (Release: 2016)
  - "TBD": Writer, producer, musician
- Twice – What Is Love?
  - "Ho!": Producer, musician
- Stacey Ryan – Blessing In Disguise (Tracks 2-11)
