= Chris Gelbuda =

US singer-songwriter

- Born: Christopher John Gelbuda; 1983 (age 42–43)
- Origin: Ottawa, Illinois, United States
- Genres: Country; pop
- Occupation: Songwriter
- Years active: 2012–present

Chris Gelbuda is an American singer-songwriter who is a staff songwriter and producer for Curb Word Music Publishing.

Chris was the writer and vocalist on the German dance #1 hit "Bad Ideas" by Alle Farben, which went platinum. Gelbuda co-wrote and produced "3 A.M." and "Just A Friend" with Meghan Trainor. He also produced her hit single, "Like I'm Gonna Lose You", featuring John Legend, which was certified quadruple Platinum in the U.S. and has reached #8 on the Billboard Hot 100 and #1 on the Billboard Adult Top 40 (as of December 3, 2015). Both songs appear on Meghan Trainor's multi-platinum debut album, "Title".

Other notable cuts include "Problems" by Neal Francis, "West of Tulsa" by Wyatt Flores, "I Found You" by Nate Smith, "You Could've Loved Me" by Frankie Ballard, "Love Me Or Leave Me Alone" by Dustin Lynch, "Love Do What It Do" By Robert Randolph feat. Darius Rucker, "Small Town Saturday Night" by Wheeler Walker, Jr., "Can't Blame a Girl for Trying" recorded by rising Disney star, Sabrina Carpenter (Co-written with Meghan Trainor and Al Anderson, and "Wingman", recorded by country artist, Billy Currington. Gelbuda has scored song placements in various major network television shows including "Nashville", ABC's Pretty Little Liars and TNT's Dallas.

Gelbuda is also an experienced multi-instrumentalist. Trained in classical piano from age 6 at The Suzuki School of Music, Gelbuda is also skilled in playing many additional instruments, including; guitar, Hammond B3, Wurlitzer 200a, banjo, mandolin, ukulele, drums, percussion, and bass. He has performed with various bands and musicians, including: Phil Lesh and Friends, Euforquestra, Japanese Cartoon, The Matthew Santos Band, Van Ghost, Everyone Orchestra, James Otto, and Secondhand Smoke: A Tribute to Sublime.
