= My Kind of Present =

Song by Meghan Trainor

from the album A Very Trainor Christmas
- B-side: "Last Christmas"
- Released: October 7, 2020
- Genre: Holiday; Doo-Wop
- Length: 2:41
- Label: Honest OG; Epic Records
- Songwriters: Justin Trainor; Meghan Trainor; Ryan Trainor
- Producers: Justin Trainor; Meghan Trainor

Music video
- "My Kind of Present" on YouTube

"My Kind of Present" is a holiday song by American singer-songwriter Meghan Trainor released on her 2020 album, A Very Trainor Christmas. It is a doo-wop and retro-inspired holiday song written by Trainor along with her two brothers, Justin Trainor and Ryan Trainor. "My Kind of Present" was released on October 7, 2020 alongside Trainor's cover of Last Christmas by Wham!.

== Background ==
"My Kind of Present" was written by Trainor and her brothers, Justin Trainor and Ryan Trainor. Written during the COVID-19 lockdown, the song was conceived of as a love song centering around a gift motif. Trainor has also mentioned the song as referencing her children, of whom she was pregnant with her first child at the time of the song's release. Trainor sings about only wanting her partner and no other presents for Christmas.

== Music video ==
The November 26, 2021 music video for "My Kind of Present" was choreographed and directed by Charm La'Donna and features Trainor with her family. The music video has Trainor reading a book to her son that features her wrapping gifts, decorating a Christmas tree, and giving gifts to her family.

== Credits and personnel ==
Credits are adapted from the liner notes of Trainor's album, A Very Trainor Christmas.

- Justin Trainor – producer, songwriter, background vocals, programming, engineering
- Meghan Trainor – producer, songwriter, lead vocals, background vocals, vocal production, keyboard
- Eddie Benjamin – guitar
- Gary Trainor – background vocals
- Ryan Trainor – background vocals
- Daryl Sabara – background vocals
- Kelli Trainor – background vocals
- Tommy Bruce – background vocals
- Jon Castelli – mixing
- Josh Deguzman – mixing
- Dale Becker – mastering

== Charts ==
Chart performance for "My Kind of Present"
Chart (2020–2025)	Peak position
Canada AC (Billboard)	13
Holiday Digital Song Sales (Billboard)	1
Lithuania Airplay (TopHit)	25
