= I'll Be Home (Meghan Trainor song) =

Song by Meghan Trainor

from the EP I'll Be Home for Christmas and the album A Very Trainor Christmas
- Released: November 17, 2014
- Genre: Christmas
- Length: 3:39
- Label: Epic
- Songwriter: Meghan Trainor
- Producer: Meghan Trainor

"I'll Be Home" is a song by American singer-songwriter Meghan Trainor from the extended play I'll Be Home for Christmas (2014), released by Epic Records. The song later appeared on the Japanese and special editions of her debut major-label studio album Title (2015) and as a streaming and Target bonus track on her 2020 Christmas album A Very Trainor Christmas. Written and produced by Trainor, "I'll Be Home" is a Christmas ballad with lyrics about promising to be home for Christmas.

Music critics praised the song as a positive change of sound from her other work. Commercially, it first peaked in 2015 at positions 56 in Switzerland, 72 in the Netherlands, and 35 in Sweden, where it received a Gold certification. It was not until December 2018 and early 2019, that "I'll Be Home" appeared on various other single charts, including number 53 in Austria, number 31 in Norway and number 45 in Germany.

== Background and reception ==
A Christmas ballad, Meghan Trainor wrote and produced "I'll Be Home". Initially released on the Epic Records-issued extended play I'll Be Home for Christmas (2014), the song also later appeared on the Japanese and special editions of her debut major-label studio album Title (2015). Time's Nolan Feeney included "I'll Be Home" on an article called "5 Depressing Christmas Songs from 2014 That Will Totally Bum You Out", and noted it as a positive change of sound compared to Trainor's other work, writing "there are no handclaps or upright bass sounds on 'I'll Be Home.' Instead, a simple piano ballad shows off the singer’s voice (the prettiest it has ever sounded)". In 2020, it was issued as a bonus track of Trainor's A Very Trainor Christmas.

Writing for Entertainment Tonight, John Boone also made note of the song's difference from Trainor's breakout hit "All About That Bass" (2014), highlighting "Santa called to make sure I'm prepared / He said ‘Wrap the gifts with all your love and care’ / The wind blows the snow up in the sky / But I won't let the wind delay my flight" as his choice lyrics. According to Fuse's Jeff Benjamin, it is "an original heartfelt winter ballad about promising to be home for Christmas", while Emilee Lindner of MTV News thought that "I'll Be Home" sees Trainor "shak[ing] off her signature sass and show[ing] off her sweet vocals". Jezebel's Clover Hope stated that the song "could use a touch more flavor".

== Commercial performance ==
In 2015, "I'll Be Home" charted at number 65 in Sweden, 94 in the Netherlands and number 24 on the Belgium Ultratip chart. In 2016, the song climbed to number 72 in the Netherlands. It finally entered the single charts in Germany in 2017, where it first appeared at number 66. That same year, "I'll Be Home" reached a new high of number 35 in Sweden and entered the chart in Switzerland at number 93. In December 2018, the song reached charts in several countries, including number 45 in Germany, 79 in the Netherlands, number 31 in Norway, 35 in Sweden and number 56 in Switzerland. On the week dated January 4, 2019, it debuted at its peak of 53 in Austria. "I'll Be Home" was certified gold in Sweden.

== Charts ==
Chart performance for "I'll Be Home"
Chart (2015–2025)	Peak position
Australia (ARIA)	99
Austria (Ö3 Austria Top 40)	35
Belgium (Ultratip Bubbling Under Flanders)	24
Canada AC (Billboard)	4
Canada Hot AC (Billboard)	49
Estonia Airplay (TopHit)	54
Germany (GfK)	31
Global 200 (Billboard)	121
Hungary (Stream Top 40)	39
Netherlands (Single Top 100)	54
Norway (VG-lista)	31
Sweden (Sverigetopplistan)	35
Switzerland (Schweizer Hitparade)	41
UK Singles (Official Charts)	70
US Adult Contemporary (Billboard)	5
US Holiday Songs (Billboard)	52

== Certifications ==
Certifications for "I'll Be Home"
Region	Certification	Certified units/sales
Australia (ARIA)	Gold	35,000^{‡}
Canada (Music Canada)	Platinum	80,000^{‡}
Denmark (IFPI Danmark)	Platinum	90,000^{‡}
Germany (BVMI)	Gold	200,000^{‡}
New Zealand (RMNZ)	Gold	15,000^{‡}
Sweden (GLF)	Gold	4,000,000^{†}
United Kingdom (BPI)	Gold	400,000^{‡}
^{‡} Sales+streaming figures based on certification alone.^{†} Streaming-only figures based on certification alone.
