= A Very Trainor Christmas =

- Standard cover

Studio album by Meghan Trainor
- Released: October 30, 2020
- Genre: Christmas
- Length: 54:31
- Labels: Honest OG; Epic
- Producers: Justin Trainor; Asa Welch; Mike Sabath; Ryan Met; Federico Vindver; Meghan Trainor; Eddie Benjamin

Meghan Trainor chronology
Treat Myself (2020)	A Very Trainor Christmas (2020)	Takin' It Back (2022)

Singles from A Very Trainor Christmas
- 1. "White Christmas" Released: 2020

A Very Trainor Christmas is a Christmas album and the fourth studio album by the American singer-songwriter Meghan Trainor. It was released by Honest OG Recording, LLC and Epic Records on October 30, 2020. Trainor involved her family members in the creation, co-writing its songs with her brothers, Ryan and Justin, among others. It features artists such as Earth, Wind & Fire; Seth MacFarlane; Trainor's cousins Jayden, Jenna, and Marcus Toney; and her father, Gary. The album includes cover versions of Christmas standards such as "It's Beginning to Look a Lot Like Christmas" (1951) and "Last Christmas" (1984), as well as several original recordings.

Trainor promoted A Very Trainor Christmas with public appearances and televised performances. It was supported by the single release of Trainor and MacFarlane's cover of "White Christmas" (1942), which reached number one on the Adult Contemporary chart. Several other tracks received music videos. Critical commentary for the album was generally positive, with praise directed towards Trainor's charisma and the material. It reached number seven on the US Top Holiday Albums chart and the top 50 in the Netherlands and Sweden.

== Background ==
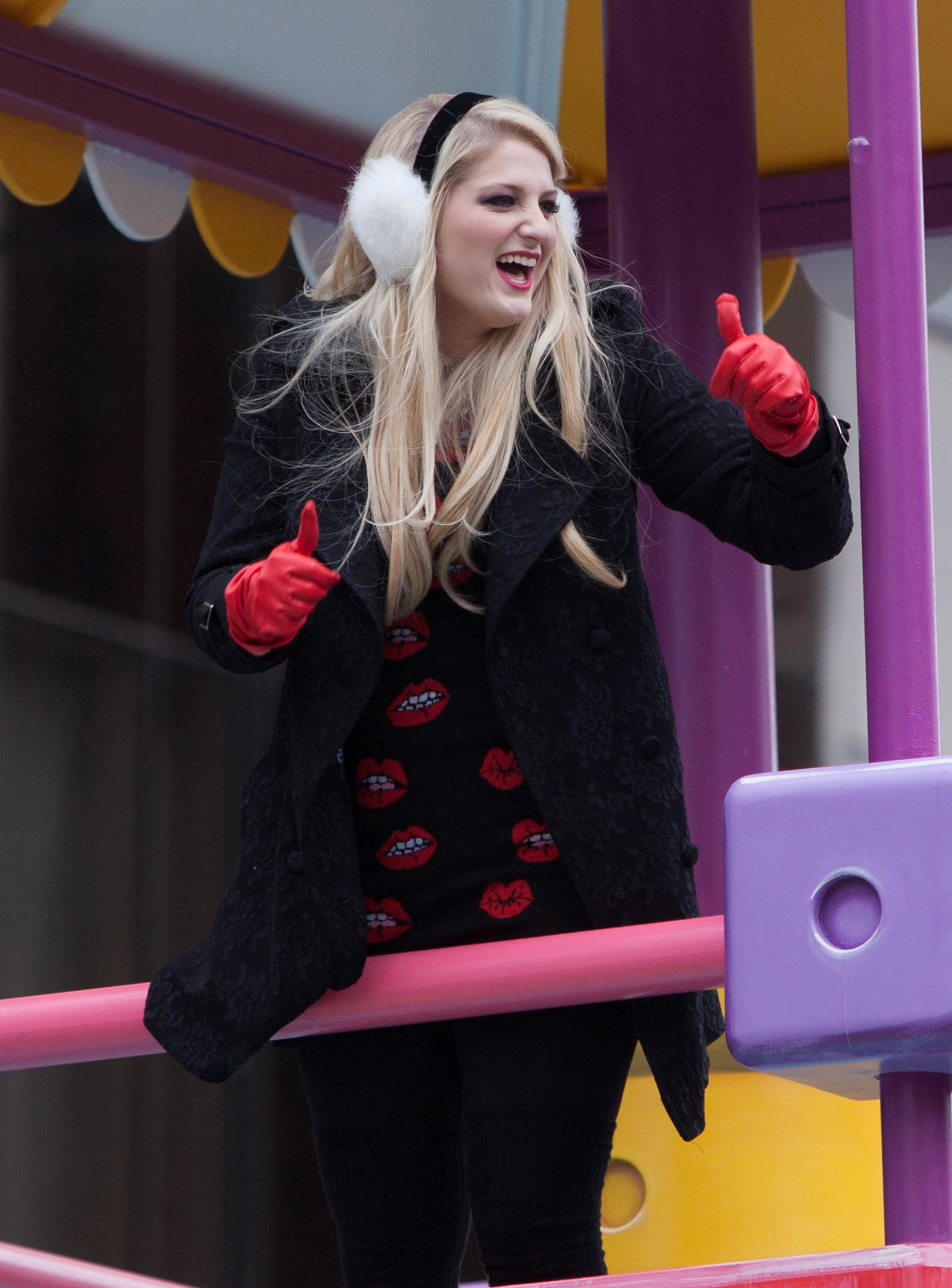
Meghan Trainor (pictured in 2014) provided vocal production on all of the tracks on A Very Trainor Christmas.

Meghan Trainor forayed into Christmas music by contributing the original song "I'll Be Home" to the Epic Records extended play I'll Be Home for Christmas in 2014. She featured on Brett Eldredge's cover version of "Baby, It's Cold Outside" (1944), for his 2016 album Glow, and released a cover version of "White Christmas" (1942) two years later for a Spotify playlist.

In January 2020, shortly before the release of Trainor's third major-label studio album, Treat Myself (2020), Billboard announced that she had started writing original Christmas songs, planning to release them later in the year. Three months into the COVID-19 lockdowns, she decided that it was the right time to complete her Christmas album: "We're gonna be here for a minute. Let's do the album now while we're stuck at home and not traveling." With the gloom surrounding the world at the time, her intention with the project was to "spread some joy this year". In a June 2020 interview, Trainor stated that she had been "trying to finish my Christmas album", further confirming the project.

Trainor recalled that most of the work for the album, including the photoshoot, was done in July and August when the weather was hot. Trainor pre-recorded two music videos and fifteen performances five months into her pregnancy, for later use. She wanted the album to feel like "a pop Christmas", something that could be played throughout the year, and decided to include original songs along with covers. On September 9, 2020, Trainor officially announced the album title as A Very Trainor Christmas on her social media accounts, along with the release date and artwork, which features her biting a candy cane while clad in a Christmas hat and a tinsel and bows-adorned dress. A trailer for the album was released the following day, consisting of home footage of Trainor and her family.

== Composition ==
Trainor's entire family participated in the creation of A Very Trainor Christmas, as songwriters, background vocalists, producers, and instrumentalists. Her cousins Jayden, Jenna & Marcus Toney, and father, Gary, appear as featured artists, while her brother Justin took part in production and songwriting and Ryan in the latter. Regarding this decision, Trainor stated that she is "a Christmas baby", and had always dreamed of releasing "a Christmas album and to do it with my family makes it that much better". Earth, Wind & Fire and Seth MacFarlane were chosen as collaborators due to them being her family's interminable preferences. Trainor stated that her family "worship[s] the ground they walk on – so to get them to feature on this album still doesn't feel real. Best Christmas Present Ever!"

A Very Trainor Christmas contains ten cover versions of Christmas standards, such as "It's Beginning to Look a Lot Like Christmas" (1951) and "Last Christmas" (1984), as well as six original recordings—"My Kind of Present", "I Believe in Santa", "Holidays", "Christmas Party", "Christmas Got Me Blue", and "Naughty List". (Note: The Target edition includes one additional original song and cover, and the deluxe edition includes all eighteen songs along with one original track and two covers.) A Target edition of the album includes "I'll Be Home" and a cover version of "A Holly Jolly Christmas" (1964). The deluxe version includes the original song "Christmas Coupon", and covers of "Rockin' Around the Christmas Tree" (1958) and "Christmas (Baby Please Come Home)" (1963). Trainor's cover of "Jingle Bells" (1857) appears on an extended deluxe edition.

On "My Kind of Present", Trainor delivers throwback doo-wop vocals and insists the subject is her "kind of present" and she does not want any other gift for Christmas. Conceived as a love song, she eventually started relating it to her affection towards her son: "When I perform it live, I do a dance where I tap my belly and I'm like, (singing) you're my kind of present." "I Believe in Santa" was inspired by Trainor's quarrels with her friends, when she was aged 10, about whether Santa was real. "Holidays", featuring Earth, Wind & Fire, "illustrates the connecting threads between '70s R&B/pop and current-day pop", according to Allan Sculley of The Spokesman-Review. On "Naughty List", Trainor questions why she was placed on "the naughty list" and wonders if it was because she was "too good for [Santa]"; inspired by Ryan's affinity with hip hop music, it was written as a rap before being turned into a pop song.

The covers on A Very Trainor Christmas are performed in a similar style to the original songs, not deviating too much from them. Sculley thought that though Trainor "adds a few original touches, [...] the frothy instrumentation on these songs is standard stuff for today's version of pop music". "Last Christmas" incorporates 1980s synthesizers and clapping. She sings "Winter Wonderland" (1934) with a lilt and ukulele accompaniment. The Associated Press's Mark Kennedy described Trainor's cover of "Sleigh Ride" (1948) as "'60s-meets-2020" and "Silent Night" (1818) as "churchlike".

== Release and promotion ==
On October 7, 2020, Trainor released "My Kind of Present" and her cover version of "Last Christmas". Her entertainment company Honest OG Recording and Epic Records released A Very Trainor Christmas on October 30. A 2020 single, Trainor and MacFarlane's cover version of "White Christmas" debuted at number 24 on the Adult Contemporary chart issued dated November 14, 2020, the third holiday entry for both, and it later peaked at number 1 on the chart. A music video for "Holidays" was released on November 23. In it, Trainor wears tiny gift bows on her face along with a white winter dress and a large red bow. The song was further promoted with performances on The Tonight Show Starring Jimmy Fallon and NBC's Christmas in Rockefeller Center special. Today's Lindsay Lowe noted she wore "a lot of oversized bows" during promotion for the album, which she described as a "bold pregnancy style". On December 2, 2020, Trainor performed "Last Christmas" and "Holidays" on Today. Eight days later, the music video for "I Believe in Santa", starring JoJo Siwa, was released. Trainor performed "Christmas Got Me Blue" on The Late Late Show with James Corden on December 15.

The deluxe version of A Very Trainor Christmas was released on October 29, 2021. On November 26, 2021, Trainor released the music video for "My Kind of Present", featuring appearances from her husband, Daryl Sabara, and their son Riley. Her cover version of "Rockin' Around the Christmas Tree" peaked at number 16 on the Adult Contemporary chart dated December 11, 2021. On December 16, Trainor performed "My Kind of Present" and "Rockin' Around the Christmas Tree" on Today. During the 2022 Disney Parks Christmas Day Parade, she performed "My Kind of Present" live.

== Reception ==
Professional ratings
Review scores
Source	Rating
AllMusic	3.5/5 stars
The Courier-Mail	4/5 stars
Knoxville News Sentinel	3/5 stars

Critical commentary for A Very Trainor Christmas was generally positive; some praised Trainor's charisma. AllMusic's Stephen Thomas Erlewine thought she approached it with the same enthusiasm as her usual "old-fashioned showbiz razzle-dazzle" style. He added that the original recordings sound the most ebullient, but the whole album is "firmly within the realm of spirited seasonal soundtrack". Sculley believed that Trainor was cheerful and charismatic.

Others commented on the material. Sculley thought it is "fun and more original than many holiday albums". Kennedy declared A Very Trainor Christmas "the best Christmas album of 2020" and described it as "a multi-textured triumph" due to Trainor's voice. The Courier-Mail's Monique Pueblos believed the original songs create a festive yet unconventional mood and the covers are performed with integrity that does not change the original songs too much: "[The album] is full of feel-good tunes both old and new and will have you feeling the Christmas spirit year after year." On the other hand, Knoxville News Sentinel's Chuck Campbell wrote that it lacks "well-crafted classics" to set it apart from other holiday albums, and the momentum is "routinely thwarted" by a combination of familiar and unfamiliar songs, which lead to "the party never hit[ting] its stride". In December 2025, People's Rachel McRady published an opinion piece commending the album's lyrics, guest artists, and five original holiday tracks.

In the United States, A Very Trainor Christmas debuted at number 144 on the Billboard 200 issued for November 14, 2020, with 7,000 album-equivalent units. Trainor's lowest-charting album, it eventually peaked at number 89. The album entered at number seven on the Top Holiday Albums chart. A Very Trainor Christmas peaked at number 70 and charted for two weeks on the Canadian Albums Chart. The album reached number 47 on the UK Download Albums chart. It charted at number 42 in the Netherlands and Sweden. In Belgium, A Very Trainor Christmas peaked at number 71.

== Track listing ==
A Very Trainor Christmas track listing
No.	Title	Writer(s)	Producer	Length
1.	"My Kind of Present"	Meghan Trainor; Justin Trainor; Ryan Trainor	J. Trainor	2:41
2.	"It's Beginning to Look a Lot Like Christmas"	Meredith Willson	Asa Welch	2:08
3.	"I Believe in Santa"	M. Trainor; J. Trainor; R. Trainor	J. Trainor	2:38
4.	"Last Christmas"	George Michael	Welch	4:03
5.	"Holidays" (featuring Earth, Wind & Fire)	M. Trainor; Mike Sabath; Phillip Bailey; Eddie Benjamin; Verdine White; Ralph Johnson	Sabath	2:45
6.	"Christmas Party"	M. Trainor; Ryan Met; J. Trainor; R. Trainor	Met	2:55
7.	"Winter Wonderland"	Richard B. Smith	J. Trainor	2:18
8.	"White Christmas" (featuring Seth MacFarlane)	Irving Berlin	Welch	3:01
9.	"Holly Jolly Christmas" (bonus track)	Johnny Marks	Welch	1:45
10.	"Christmas Got Me Blue"	M. Trainor; Met; J. Trainor	Met	3:33
11.	"Sleigh Ride"	Leroy Anderson; Mitchell Parish	Federico Vindver	3:48
12.	"My Only Wish"	Brian Kierulf; Josh Schwartz	Vindver	4:02
13.	"The Christmas Song"	Robert Wells; Mel Tormé	Vindver	3:35
14.	"Rudolph the Red-Nosed Reindeer" (featuring Jayden, Jenna, & Marcus Toney)	Marks	Welch	2:30
15.	"Naughty List"	M. Trainor; J. Trainor; R. Trainor	M. Trainor	2:37
16.	"Have Yourself a Merry Little Christmas" (featuring Gary Trainor)	Hugh Martin; Ralph Blane	J. Trainor	3:48
17.	"I'll Be Home" (bonus track)	M. Trainor	M. Trainor	3:39
18.	"Silent Night"	Franz Xaver Gruber; Joseph Mohr	Benjamin	2:45
Total length:				54:31

2021 digital deluxe edition bonus tracks

1. "Christmas Coupon" (writer: M. Trainor) – 3:12
2. "Rockin' Around the Christmas Tree" (writer: Johnny Marks) – 2:28
3. "Christmas (Baby Please Come Home)" (writer: Jeff Barry, Ellie Greenwich, Phil Spector) – 2:28

2023 Amazon Music deluxe edition bonus track

22. "Jingle Bells" (writer: James Lord Pierpont) – 2:15

Notes

- "Holly Jolly Christmas" and "I'll Be Home" are available on the track list worldwide on all digital platforms, however they are exclusive to Target in the United States for all CD editions of A Very Trainor Christmas. They do not appear on any vinyl editions of the album, or CD editions outside of the United States.
- The 2024 extended digital deluxe edition of A Very Trainor Christmas is the same as the Amazon Music 2023 deluxe edition, with an alternate track order and full availability on all digital platforms.

== Personnel ==
Credits are adapted from the liner notes of A Very Trainor Christmas.

- Meghan Trainor – lead vocals (all tracks), background vocals (1–6), vocal production (all tracks), keyboards (1), ukulele (7), production (1, 3), programming (15, 17), piano, guitar, engineering (17)
- Justin Trainor – production (1, 3, 7, 10, 15–16), programming (1, 3, 15), background vocals (1, 3, 5–6, 8), engineering (1–16, 18), vocal production (14, 16), mixing (16)
- Eddie Benjamin – guitar (1, 5), background vocals (5, 18), production (5), vocal production, keyboards, mixing (18)
- Gary Trainor – background vocals (1), piano (16)
- Ryan Trainor – background vocals (1, 3, 6), production (6)
- Daryl Sabara – background vocals (1, 3, 5–6)
- Kelli Trainor – background vocals (1)
- Tommy Bruce – background vocals (1)
- Jon Castelli – mixing (1–4, 6–15)
- Dale Becker – mastering (1–16, 18)
- Asa Welch – production (2, 4, 8–9, 14)
- Drew Taubenfeld – guitar (2, 7–9, 15), electric guitar (14), bass (15), pedal steel guitar (2), engineer (2)
- Tommy King – drums (2, 4), bass (2, 4), guitar (2, 4), piano (2, 4, 8–9, 14)
- Jon Yeston – engineering (2, 4, 8–9, 14)
- Mike Sabath – production (5), vocal production (5), background vocals (5), programming (5), engineering (5), Mellotron (spelt as "Melatron") (5)
- Philip Bailey – lead vocals (5), background vocals (5), percussion (5)
- Tristan Hurd – background vocals (5), trumpets (5)
- Maddie Ziegler – background vocals (5)
- Philip Doron Bailey – background vocals (5)
- Verdine White – bass (5)
- John Paris – drums (5)
- Ralph Johnson – percussion (5)
- Rashawn Ross – trumpets (5)
- Will Artope – trumpets (5)
- Gary Bias – alto saxophone (5), tenor saxophone (5)
- Reginald Young – trombone (5)
- Morris O'Connor – guitar (5)
- Ray Brown – horns orchestration (5), contractor (5)
- Kenny Moran – engineering (5)
- Serban Ghenea – mixing (5)
- Ryan Met – production (6), programming (6), engineering (6, 10)
- Seth MacFarlane – lead vocals, background vocals (8)
- Federico Vindver – production, engineering (11–13), electric guitar, acoustic guitar, bass, synths, keyboards, percussion, programming (12), string, horn, piano, celesta, xylophone, percussion (13)
- Mike Cordone – trumpet (11, 13)
- Erik Hughes – trombone (11)
- Jesse McGinty – saxophone, flute, piccolo (11), trombone, French horn, flute (13)
- Davide Rossi – violin, viola, cello (13)
- Jeff Gitty – guitar (13)
- Kiel Feher – drums (13)
- Marcus Toney – background vocals (14)
- Jayden Toney – background vocals (14)
- Jenna Toney – background vocals (14)
- Manny Marroquin – mixing (17)
- Dave Kutch – mastering (17)
- Josh Deguzman – assistant mixing (1–4, 6)
- Ryan Wohlgemut – background vocals (3)
- Jordan Federman – background vocals (3)

== Charts ==
Weekly chart positions for A Very Trainor Christmas
Chart (2020–2023)	Peak position
Belgian Albums (Ultratop Flanders)	71
Canadian Albums (Billboard)	70
Dutch Albums (Album Top 100)	42
German Albums (Offizielle Top 100)	44
Swedish Albums (Sverigetopplistan)	42
UK Albums Sales (OCC)	96
US Billboard 200	89
US Top Holiday Albums (Billboard)	7

== Release history ==
Release dates and format(s) for A Very Trainor Christmas
Region	Date	Format(s)	Label(s)	Edition	Ref.
Various	October 30, 2020	CD; digital download; LP; streaming	Honest OG; Epic	Original	
Various	October 30, 2020	CD	Epic	Target	
Various	October 29, 2021	Digital download; streaming	Honest OG; Epic	Deluxe	
