= Ben Fagan =

Ben Fagan (born February 28, 1984) is an American TV reality show winner and musician.

== Early life and education ==
Fagan was born on February 28, 1984, in Boston, Massachusetts. Soon after his birth, his family moved to Folly Beach, South Carolina, where he was raised. He graduated Phi Beta Kappa from the University of South Carolina with a double major in Business Administration and Marketing Management, and a minor in Spanish.

== Pirate Master ==
Fagan was one of sixteen "pirates" in pursuit of a potential $1,000,000 grand prize on the CBS show Pirate Master. The show's contestants were split into two separate "crews", and competed against one another each week in searches for hidden treasure. Fagan was placed in the "Black Crew", where he remained for almost the entire run of show, apart from weeks four, five, nine and thirteen.

Fagan defeated Christa DeAngelo in the final, winning a $500,000 grand prize. He then gave the money he earned over the show's duration – $87,624 - to his teammates, thanking them for their participation in the final, and kept the $500,000 grand prize for himself.

== Music ==
Fagan was the lead singer, songwriter, and guitarist of the Charleston, South Carolina–based band "The Plainfield Project," from 2006 - 2010. Their self-titled debut album was released on iTunes in 2009. After The Plainfield Project, Fagan started a funk/reggae/hip-hop-influenced band called "Ben Fagan and the Holy City Hooligans." The band's debut cd, "The Freestyle Sessions 1," was released in 2011. Their second cd, entitled "The Freestyle Sessions 1 & 2," was released in 2013. Fagan was a co-writer with Meghan Trainor on the song "3 AM," the 5th track on her debut full-length album called "Title," released in January, 2015.
