= Ralph Johnson (musician) =

American drummer

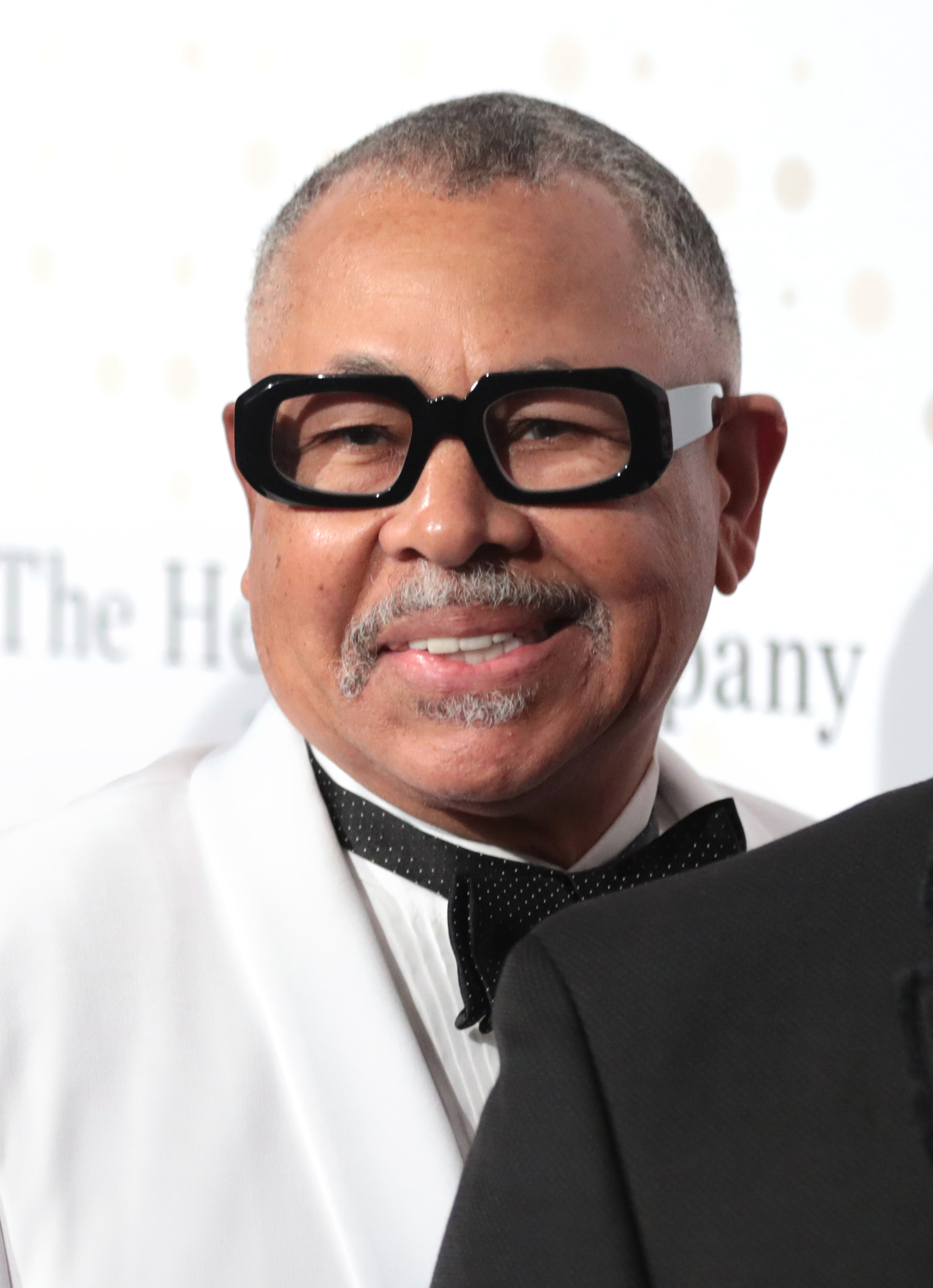
- Johnson in 2023

Background information
- Born: July 4, 1951 (age 75); Los Angeles, California, U.S.
- Genres: R&B, funk, soul, jazz
- Occupations: Musician, producer, singer, songwriter, author
- Instruments: Vocals, drums, percussion, keyboards, drum machine
- Years active: 1972–present
- Website: https://www.earthwindandfire.com/

External videos
- Oral History, Ralph Johnson shares how he met Maurice White and joined Earth, Wind and Fire. Interview date September 2, 2014, NAMM (National Association of Music Merchants) Oral History Library

Ralph Randolph Johnson (born July 4, 1951) is an American singer, songwriter, musician and producer. Johnson is a member and percussionist of the funk/soul/disco band Earth, Wind & Fire.

== Early life ==
Johnson was born and raised in Los Angeles. His father was a lyricist and his mother was a vocalist, and they had music always playing in their home. At the age of eight years old Johnson received his first snare drum and drum lesson. Johnson developed a love of R&B music, listening mainly to Motown and Stax and Sly and the Family Stone. He played in elementary, junior high and high school bands. At age 13, he attended a James Brown concert, which was his first live concert and was amazed by the three drum sets on the stage. In 1965, Johnson's brother introduced him to the world of Jazz. He joined local bands "The Teen Turbans" and "The Masters Children".

== Earth, Wind and Fire ==
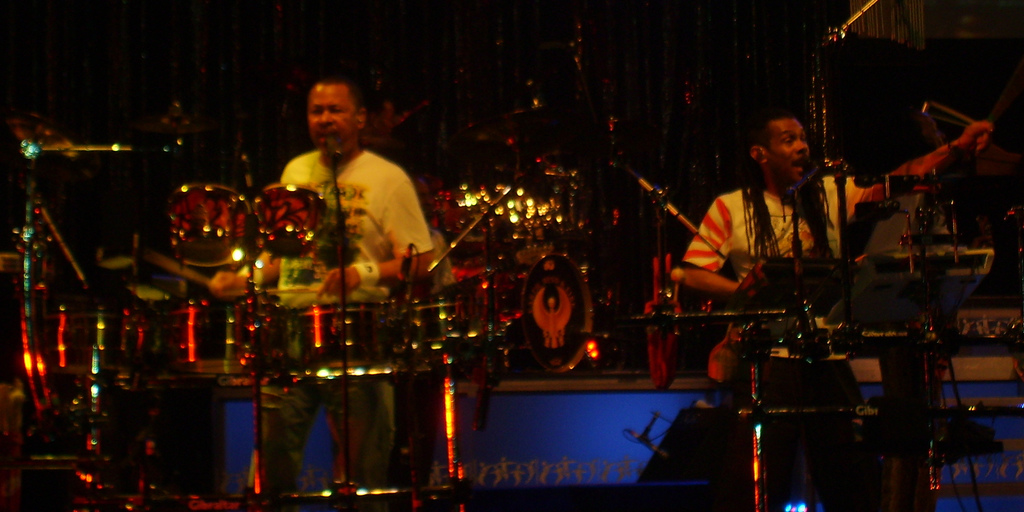
Johnson, left, performing with Earth Wind and Fire in 2007

In 1971, musician Maurice White the founder and bandleader of Earth, Wind & Fire, dismantled his band after recording two albums for Warner Bros. Records, leaving just him and his brother, bassist Verdine White. In December 1971, after White saw Johnson playing at a club in Los Angeles, he called and asked Johnson to audition for a new line up of Earth, Wind & Fire. White added Johnson, vocalist Helena Davis, vocalist Phillip Bailey, flutist Ronnie Laws, keyboardist Larry Dunn, and rhythm guitarist Roland Bautista to his new line up. Vocalist Jessica Cleave a former member of Friends of Distinction soon replaced Davis. The new members along with the White brothers, became the new version of Earth, Wind & Fire. In 1972, they left Warner Bros. and recorded their album, "The Last Days and Times" for CBS.

As an Earth, Wind & Fire percussionist, Johnson was inducted into the Rock & Roll Hall of Fame, received 6 Grammy wins and 2 honorary Grammys, received a Star on the Hollywood Walk of Fame, earned 50 platinum and gold RIAA awards, 4 American Music Awards, and have sold over 90 million in record sales making them one of the world's best-selling bands of all time.

== Solo projects ==
In 2000, Johnson traveled to Copenhagen, Denmark with Morris Pleasure to start a new conceptual jazz project. The members of the jazz ensemble known as Audio Caviar were Johnson, Pleasure and Steen Kyed. The band release an album entitled Transoceanic that featured guest artists including Howard Hewett, Janet Jackson, Johnson's bandmate Phillip Bailey, Jonathan Butler, George Duke, and others.

In 2014, Johnson teamed up with singer and writer, Siedah Garrett and released a Christmas song entitled, "Have a Very Merry Christmas" written by Johnson, Garrett, Erik Nuri and Raymond Crossley. The song was featured in the 2019 film, Holiday Rush starring singer Darlene Love.

In 2019, Johnson released a solo project entitled, "Co-Swagit (Everything's Cool)".

In March 2020, Johnson and jazz pianist Gerald Clayton released a single entitled, "Smooth and You" written by Johnson, Raymond Crossley, Gerald Clayton, and D. Stone. The song was produced by Johnson and Crossley.

Johnson has worked with a wide range of artists in different capacities. As a percussionist on Blue Magic's 1978 album Message From The Magic and Stanley Turrentine's 1981 album Tender Togetherness. He worked as a producer on The Temptations' 1984 album Truly For You and Howard Hewett's 2008 album Howard Hewett Christmas. Johnson also worked with Drake, Nathan East, Meghan Trainor, and others.

== Personal life ==
Johnson serves as an assistant karate instructor at his teacher, Mark Zacharatos' school, when he is not travelling. Johnson holds two black belt degrees. A 1st Degree Tang Soo Do and a 3rd Degree in Kung Fu Sansoo. He is a certified scuba diver with an advanced open water certification and a student pilot. Johnson is fond of jazz and is an art collector.

== Discography ==
=== Other projects ===
- 1978 – Blue Magic, Message From The Magic album (Drums)
- 1981 – Stanley Turrentine, Tender Togetherness (Percussion)
- 1984 – The Temptations, "Treat Her Like A Lady" single (co-producer)
- 2001 – Jay-Z sampled Johnson's song entitled "Song Cry" on his album The Blueprint.
- 2003 – Audio Caviar, (Album) Transoceanic (Performer, Percussion, Drums, co-arranger, Co-writer and Co-producer).
- 2008 – Howard Hewett, Howard Hewett Christmas (Audio Production, Drums, Main Personnel)
- 2014 – Johnson and Siedah Garette, "Have A Very Merry Christmas" (Co-writer and performer)
- 2016 – Nathan East, "Serpentine Fire" (Featured Artist, Vocals)
- 2017 – Nathan East, "Reverence" (Featured Artist, Percussion)
- 2019 – Johnson, "Co-Swagit (Everything's Cool)" (Writer, Performer)
- 2020 – Meghan Trainor, "Holidays" off of her album A Very Trainor Christmas (Composer, Percussion)
- 2020 – Drake, "When to Say When" (Composer)
- 2020 – Ralph Johnson and Eric Clayton, "Smooth and You" (Co-writer and Co-producer)

== Awards ==
=== RIAA Awards ===
Multi-platinum albums

- 1975 – That's The Way of the World
- 1975 – Gratitude
- 1976 – Spirit
- 1977 - All 'n All
- 1979 - I Am

Platinum albums

- 1973 – Head to the Sky
- 1974 – Open Our Eyes
- 1981 – Raise!

Gold albums

- 1980 – Faces
- 1983 – Powerlight
- 1987 – Touch The World
- 1988 – The Best Of Earth, Wind & Fire Vol. II
- 2003 – The Essential Earth, Wind & Fire

Gold singles

- 1975 – "Shining Star"
- 1975 – "Singasong"
- 1976 – "Getaway"
- 1978 – "September"
- 1978 – "Got To Get You into My Life"
- 1979 – "Boogie Wonderland"
- 1979 – "After The Love Has Gone"
- 1981 – "Let's Groove"

=== Inductions ===
- 1995 – Star on Hollywood's Walk Of Fame
- 2000 – Rock & Roll Hall Of Fame
- 2003 – Inducted into Hollywood's RockWalk
- 2003 – Inducted into The Vocal Group Hall Of Fame
- 2012 – Beacon of Change award at the Beacon Awards Banquet
- 2019 – Kennedy Center Honors

=== Grammy Awards ===
- 2016 – Lifetime Achievement Award
- 2008 – GRAMMY Hall Of Fame, "Shining Star"
- 2004 – NARAS Signature Governors Award
- 1982 – Best R&B Performance by a Duo Or Group With Vocals, "Wanna Be With You"
- 1979 – Best R&B Vocal Performance by a Duo, Group Or Chorus, "After The Love Has Gone"
- 1979 – Best R&B Instrumental Performance, "Boogie Wonderland"
- 1978 – Best R&B Vocal Performance by a Duo, Group Or Chorus, "All 'n All"
- 1978 – Best R&B Instrumental Performance, "Runnin'"
- 1975 – Best R&B Vocal Performance by a Duo, Group Or Chorus, "Shining Star"

=== American Music Awards ===
- 1976 – Favorite Band, Duo Or Group - Soul/Rhythm & Blues
- 1977 – Favorite Band, Duo Or Group - Soul/Rhythm & Blues
- 1978 – Favorite Band, Duo Or Group - Soul/Rhythm & Blues
- 1980 – Favorite Band, Duo Or Group - Soul/Rhythm & Blues

=== Other awards ===
- 1994 – NAACP Hall Of Fame Image Award
- 2002 – BET Lifetime Achievement Award
- 2002 – ASCAP Rhythm & Soul Heritage Award
- 2002 – TV Land's Entertainer Award
- 2008 – Honorary Doctorates in the arts from Columbia College in Chicago
