= I'm a Lady =

Single by Meghan Trainor
- Released: February 24, 2017
- Genre: Pop
- Length: 2:45
- Label: Epic
- Songwriters: Meghan Trainor; Martin Renea
- Producers: Martin Renea; The Monsters and the Strangerz; Meghan Trainor

Meghan Trainor singles chronology
"Better" (2016)	"I'm a Lady" (2017)	"No Excuses" (2018)

Music video
- "I'm a Lady" on YouTube

"I'm a Lady" is a song by American singer-songwriter Meghan Trainor, for promotion of the film Smurfs: The Lost Village (2017). Trainor and Martin Renea co-wrote the song, and co-produced it alongside the Monsters and the Strangerz. Epic Records released the song for digital download and streaming as a single on February 24, 2017. Backed by percussion-heavy instrumentation, it is a retro-pop song, with the lyrics discussing loving oneself and empowerment. The song received mostly positive reviews from music critics, who noted its anthemic nature and praised the message.

"I'm a Lady" reached number 40 on the US Adult Top 40 chart in 2017. Hannah Lux Davis directed an accompanying music video, which was released on March 3, 2017. The video features solely female characters, who are seen in a boardroom, wearing a football uniform, shooting archery, and lifting weights. In 2017, Trainor performed the song live on The Ellen DeGeneres Show.

== Background and release ==
In October 2015, Trainor released the song "Better When I'm Dancin'" for The Peanuts Movie soundtrack (2015), and recorded another track entitled "Good to be Alive" for the Target edition. She and Martin Renea co-wrote "I'm a Lady", and co-produced it with the Monsters and the Strangerz. Trainor announced at the 2016 KIIS-FM Jingle Ball that she had written the song for the film Smurfs: The Lost Village (2017), describing the song as "a saxophone-driven 'banger' that's 'pretty fire'", and called it an "upbeat, love-yourself woman anthem". On February 20, 2017, Trainor announced that the song would be released the following Friday.

The artwork for "I'm a Lady" was edited by Meghan's brother Ryan Trainor and unveiled on February 23. The song was released for digital download and streaming as a single by Epic Records the next day. It was serviced to hot adult contemporary and contemporary hit radio stations in the United States on February 27 and February 28, respectively. "I'm a Lady" being used for the promotion of Smurfs: The Lost Village led to Meghan Trainor voicing the character of Smurfmelody in the film. The soundtrack for Smurfs: The Lost Village was ultimately released on March 31, 2017, with it not including the song.

== Composition and lyrics ==
"I'm a Lady"
A 16-second sample of the song's chorus, which was described as a "cute bop with a positive message".

The retro-pop nature of "I'm a Lady" was compared to Trainor's debut major-label studio album Title (2015), while its attitude, verve and "spunk" were noted to be reminiscent of her follow-up album Thank You (2016). The song includes percussion-heavy instrumentation and has a positive message, and a "campy spoken interlude" towards the end. It has empowering lyrics about loving oneself that are also a celebration of womanhood. The pre-chorus of "I'm a Lady" uplifts people who may not feel "represented by mainstream culture", with the chorus of the song conveying the message that all women should be "proud to be ladies". Both sections are repeated a few times during the song's duration.

== Reception ==
"I'm a Lady" was described as a "girl power anthem" by some music critics. Bustle's Caitlin Gallagher wrote that Trainor manages to "inspire many people to sing from the rooftops that they love themselves" within the short duration of the song, and said its beat is one that "you'll be dancing to in no time". Writing for MTV News, Madeline Roth called it an uplifting retro bop that packs "a lot of positivity", and would "brighten up" the listener's day. HuffPost's Minou Clark stated that once "I'm a Lady" is played, "you won't be able to resist the urge to get up and dance", pegging it as a contender for 2017's summer song. Christina Cauterucci of Slate wrote that the "anti-feminist lady-power shtick" of the song was "totally on brand" for Trainor, and it took the "backward vision" of Jennifer Lopez's "Ain't Your Mama" (2016) to elementary school-aged girls. Cauterucci additionally criticized Trainor for pitting women against each other with the lyrics, "I don't look like them, but I ain't worried 'bout it / I don't talk like them, but I ain't worried 'bout it". The song received a nomination for the Hollywood Music in Media Award for Best Original Song in an Animated Film at the 2017 Hollywood Music in Media Awards. It reached number 40 on the US Adult Top 40 chart in 2017.

== Music video and live performance ==
In the weeks preceding the release of "I'm a Lady", Trainor began uploading stills from its music video on her Instagram account. It was released on March 3, 2017. The video begins with Trainor performing alongside a band in a warehouse. This is interspersed with scenes of women achieving success in several walks of life, including; a boardroom, wearing a football uniform, shooting archery, and lifting weights. Outfits worn by Trainor for the visual include a white top hat, business attire, a body suit and jock attire. The video was described by Roth as conveying the message that women "can be whatever the hell they want to be. Oh, and in case you were wondering — no, there are absolutely zero men in this video. Only girls". Idolator's Mike Wass wrote that Trainor "serves looks" and "busts out some fancy choreography" in the music video, and said it clearly portrays the message that "women can wear what they want and do what they want". Cauterucci highlighted that the singer wears "traditionally masculine" outfits and portrays a "bunch of sexy characters", noting that she employs the "most basic, surface-level trappings of gender performance" to portray a female ideal. Da'Shan Smith of Billboard wrote that the visuals keep "in line with her consistent theme of female empowerment", commenting that Trainor models the same "feisty enthusiasm" as she did for "No" (2016), while positively comparing them to a Pepsi Super Bowl commercial.

Trainor performed "I'm a Lady" for The Ellen DeGeneres Show on April 7, 2017, in what was described as a "show-stopping rendition" by Today's Gina Vivinetto. This marked Trainor's first performance since undergoing her second vocal surgery and taking a vocal rest since December 2016.

== Credits and personnel ==
Credits adapted from Tidal.

- Meghan Trainor – vocals, producer
- Martin Renea – producer
- The Monsters and the Strangerz – producer
- Chris Gehringer – mastering engineer
- Stefan Johnson – mixing engineer

== Charts ==
Weekly chart positions for "I'm a Lady"
Chart (2017)	Peak position
US Adult Pop Airplay (Billboard)	40

== Certifications ==
Certifications for "I'm a Lady"
Region	Certification	Certified units/sales
Australia (ARIA)	Gold	35,000^{‡}
^{‡} Sales+streaming figures based on certification alone.

== Release history ==
Release dates and format(s) for "I'm a Lady"
Region	Date	Format(s)	Label	Ref.
Various	February 24, 2017	Digital download; streaming	Epic	
United States	February 27, 2017	Hot adult contemporary	Epic	
United States	February 28, 2017	Contemporary hit radio	Epic	
