= Better (Meghan Trainor song) =

2016 single by Meghan Trainor

Single by Meghan Trainor featuring Yo Gotti

from the album Thank You
- Released: August 29, 2016
- Genre: Dancehall; reggae; pop
- Length: 2:47
- Label: Epic
- Songwriters: Meghan Trainor; Eric Frederic; Tommy Brown; Steven Franks; Mario Mims; Taylor Parks; Travis Sayles
- Producers: Ricky Reed; Tommy Brown; Mr. Franks

Meghan Trainor singles chronology
"Me Too" (2016)	"Better" (2016)	"I'm a Lady" (2017)

Yo Gotti singles chronology
"Champions" (2016)	"Better" (2016)	"Wait for It" (2016)

Music video
- "Better" on YouTube

"Better" is a song recorded by American singer-songwriter Meghan Trainor featuring American rapper Yo Gotti released as the third and final single from Trainor's second major-label studio album Thank You (2016). Trainor, Gotti, Taylor Parks, Travis Sayles, Eric Frederic, Tommy Brown and Steven Franks wrote the song, and the latter three produced it. Initially released as a promotional single, the track was released on August 29, 2016, as the third single from the album. It was well received by critics who considered it a different direction for Trainor.

"Better" peaked at number 35 on the US Adult Top 40 and at number 27 on the US Mainstream Top 40. Released on September 15, 2016, the music video was directed by Tim Mattia and featured a cameo from Beau Bridges. Critics praised it for telling an important story and being more raw than Trainor's previous releases. Trainor performed the song on The Tonight Show Starring Jimmy Fallon, and included it on the setlist for The Untouchable Tour (2016).

== Background and composition ==
"Better" (2016)
A 16-second sample of "Better", a pop ballad which features "funky drums".

Following a disagreement with label director L.A. Reid, Meghan Trainor created the single "No" with producer Ricky Reed. Ultimately, the song changed the direction of its parent album, as they started experimenting with new musical styles and produced six more tracks. Trainor, Mario Mims, Taylor Parks, Travis Sayles, Eric Frederic, Tommy Brown and Steven Franks wrote "Better", and the latter three produced it. The song was digitally released as the third promotional single from Trainor's second major-label studio album, Thank You (2016), on April 21, 2016. It was serviced to adult contemporary radio as the third single from the album on August 29, 2016, and to top 40 radio and rhythmic radio on August 30. On September 13, 2016, she unveiled the single artwork on her social media accounts.

"Better" is a dancehall, reggae, and pop song with R&B influences. The pop ballad features "funky drums" accompanied by guitar strings which gives it an "Island-esque" vibe. The track has steel percussion, syncopated guitar, and a loping beat which gives it a caribbean feel. It features Trainor criticizing her ex-boyfriend, with lyrics about how she deserves better, over a tropical beat. On his rap verse, Gotti talks about treating Trainor the way that she deserves. Colin Stutz of Billboard called it an "empowering breakup anthem". According to Christina Lee of Idolator, the song is more vulnerable than Trainor's previous efforts.

== Reception ==
"Better" was well received from critics. Writing for Andpop, Rebecca Matina opined that "Better" is a step in a different direction from Trainor's previous works and wrote "we’re loving the throwback-Rihanna vibes that we’re getting". Alexa Camp of Slant Magazine praised the track, writing that Trainor was down-to-earth and "it feels like we’re catching a glimpse of the real Meghan". Isabella Biedenharn of Entertainment Weekly called the song "woozy" and "ethereal", but added that it sounds like "a castoff from Selena Gomez’s Revival.

"Better" peaked at number 35 on the US Adult Top 40 and at number 27 on the US Mainstream Top 40.

== Music video ==
=== Background and concept ===
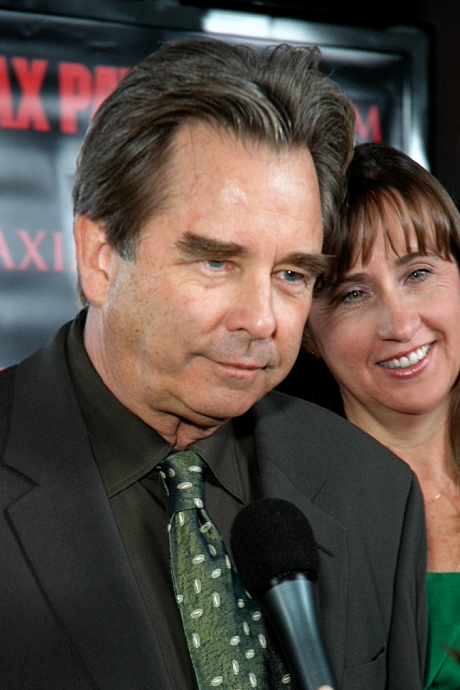
The song's music video features a cameo appearance by Beau Bridges (pictured in 2008).

On September 13, 2016, Trainor posted the first teaser of the music video for "Better" on her Instagram, followed by the second teaser on the next day. On September 15, 2016, Trainor released the video, directed by Tim Mattia. It featured a cameo from Beau Bridges with themes revolving around drug addiction and alcohol abuse. Trainor got a temporary tattoo of scissors for her role in the video.

=== Synopsis ===
The video begins with Trainor bailing her grandfather (Beau Bridges) out of a county jail. Trainor gives him a ride from the prison to a barbershop. He apologizes in the car while asking Trainor to pick up his pills from the store and Trainor admits she had already bought them to him, which he denies. The song begins as Trainor and Bridges enter the barbershop where she works as a hairdresser. As the video progresses, Trainor serves customers while her grandfather deals with his substance abuse. He has a fight in a bar and faints. A bartender (Yo Gotti) calls Trainor to inform her of this. Trainor brings him back to the house where she has fights with her grandfather. Following scenes show Gotti consoling Trainor. The video ends with Bridges being arrested again and Trainor breaking down in tears. Alternatively, the video could have been a flashback with latter events leading up to the arrest at the beginning.

=== Reception ===
The music video received critical acclaim. Fuse's Bianca Gracie praised Trainor for "get[ting] a little more raw and tell[ing] an important story that doesn't come off as too try-hard" and described the video as a "dramatic" short film. Also believing that the video "contains a serious message", Lauren Daley of The Boston Globe noted that it is reminiscent of MTV's "'80s and '90s video heyday". Allison Sadlier of Entertainment Weekly thought the video saw Trainor take an emotional journey and took the song to "new emotional heights" and Sophie Schillaci of Entertainment Tonight wrote that Trainor "turn[s] up the drama". Describing the video as a new style for Trainor, Much's Allison Bowsher said that she "is doing a 180, showing off her acting chops and shining light on substance abuse". Digital Spy's Joe Anderton gave the video a more mixed review, writing that the concept "is great, especially considering it's a song we assumed to be about a boyfriend on first listen - but it doesn't really go far enough to make a proper impact".

== Live performances ==
Trainor performed the song on The Tonight Show Starring Jimmy Fallon. The song was part of Trainor's setlist for The Untouchable Tour (2016).

== Charts ==
Chart positions for "Better"
Chart (2016)	Peak position
US Adult Pop Airplay (Billboard)	35
US Pop Airplay (Billboard)	27

== Release history ==
Release dates and format(s) for "Better"
Region	Date	Format	Label	Ref.
United States	April 22, 2016	Digital download	Epic	
United States	August 29, 2016	Hot adult contemporary	Epic	
United States	August 30, 2016	Contemporary hit radio	Epic	
United States	August 30, 2016	Rhythmic contemporary	Epic	
