= Watch Me Do =

Promotional single by Meghan Trainor

from the album Thank You
- Released: March 25, 2016
- Genre: Pop
- Length: 2:49
- Label: Epic
- Songwriters: Meghan Trainor; Eric Frederic; Jacob Kasher Hindlin; Gamal Lewis
- Producer: Ricky Reed

"Watch Me Do" is a song by American singer-songwriter Meghan Trainor from her second major-label studio album, Thank You (2016). It was released on March 25, 2016, to digital download platforms by Epic Records as the album's first promotional single. Produced by Ricky Reed, he co-wrote the song with Trainor, Jacob Kasher Hindlin and Gamal Lewis. "Watch Me Do" is a hip hop-influenced pop song, with lyrics about female empowerment. The track received mixed reviews from music critics, with some of them appreciating its empowering theme but others being critical of Trainor's rapping skills. It was performed during Trainor's The Untouchable Tour (2016).

== Background and composition ==
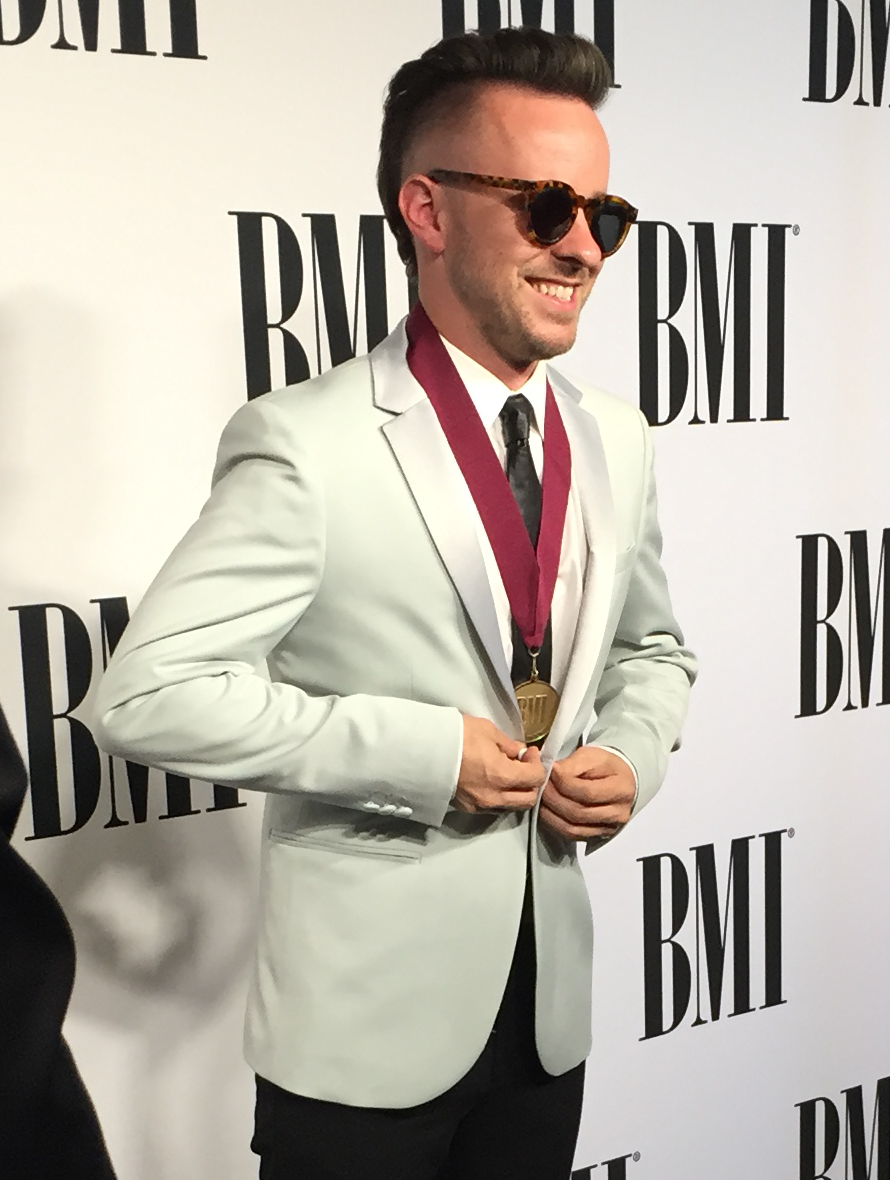
"Watch Me Do" was produced and co-written by Ricky Reed.

"Watch Me Do" was written by Meghan Trainor along with Jacob Kasher Hindlin, Gamal Lewis and Ricky Reed, with the latter also having produced the song. The song was released as the first promotional single from Trainor's second major-label studio album Thank You (2016), on March 25, 2016, by Epic Records. It is an upbeat, brass-heavy pop track where Trainor references a number of rap songs, containing "90s hip hop throwback vibes" according to MTV News. Colin Stutz of Billboard noted the presence of "swagger" and "groove", and writing "she opens the track singing over a funky drum beat before going on to gloat". Entertainment Weekly's Dana Rose Falcone described it as a "female-empowerment" track, adding that she "peppers her new song with some hip-hop and doesn't play the modesty card".

Music Times' Carolyn Menyes described the track as a notable departure from Trainor's previous work, writing "it differs greatly from the doo-wop influences of Trainor's first album and few hit singles" and compared it to the works of Christina Aguilera and Destiny's Child. Sam Warner of Digital Spy described it as a "2000s banger", and "a typically Trainor-esque empowering anthem". He likened it to the early work of Britney Spears. Idolator's Carl Williott wrote that Trainor was in "full flaunt mode", adding "she preens over a syncopated synth-horn-snare beat".

== Critical reception ==
"Watch Me Do" received mixed reviews from music critics. Spin's Dan Weiss was positive of the song, and compared it to Mark Ronson's work. Entertainment Weekly's Isabella Biedenharn called it one of the best tracks on Thank You, and said that Trainor "brings hip-hop flavor to this booty-shaking banger". Writing for USA Today, Patrick Ryan was positive about "Watch Me Do", stating that it makes clear that Trainor can "successfully do" several genres. Writing for The New York Times, Jon Caramanica called the song "tough-stand", likening it to Destiny's Child's "Independent Women (Part 1)". Bustle's Amy Roberts included "I ain't saying I'm the besteses / But I got nice curves, nice breasteses/ I don't erase the textes from my exeses/ All in my DMs, leaving messages" and "I'm the shh, be quiet/ I've been on a low-hater diet" in her list of the most empowering lyrics on Thank You.

Writing for PopMatters, Chris Conaton said that "Watch Me Do" has a "pretty strong" hook and called the James Brown references catchy, but noted that its lyrics shift from "ingénue to braggadocious star". Slant Magazine writer Alexa Camp was critical of the song, saying that it confuses "delusional self-importance with self-worth". Allison Weintraub of The Oklahoma Daily criticized it, describing it as "terrible pseudo-rap", with "weirdly pluralized words". Bustle's Mary Grace Garis criticized Trainor's use of the term "nice breasteses", and called "Watch Me Do" one of the weakest tracks on its parent album.

== Credits and personnel ==
Credits adapted from the liner notes of Thank You.

- Meghan Trainor – songwriting, background vocals, lead vocals
- Ricky Reed – songwriting, production, bass, guitar, keyboards, programming
- Tom Peyton – drums
- Jacob Kasher Hindlin – songwriting
- Gamal Lewis – songwriting

== Charts ==
Chart (2016)	Peak position
US Pop Digital Songs (Billboard)	36
