= Me Too (Meghan Trainor song) =

Single by Meghan Trainor

from the album Thank You
- Released: May 5, 2016
- Recorded: 2015
- Studio: Ricky Reed's Studio (Elysian Park, Los Angeles)
- Genre: Electro; R&B
- Length: 3:01
- Label: Epic
- Songwriters: Meghan Trainor; Eric Frederic; Jacob Kasher Hindlin; Jason Desrouleaux; Peter Svensson
- Producer: Ricky Reed

Meghan Trainor singles chronology
| "No" (2016) | "Me Too" (2016) | "Better" (2016) |

Music video
- "Me Too" on YouTube

"Me Too" is a song by the American singer-songwriter Meghan Trainor from her second major-label studio album, Thank You (2016). Trainor wrote the song with Jacob Kasher Hindlin, Jason Derulo, Peter Svensson, and its producer, Ricky Reed. Epic Records released it as the album's second single on May 5, 2016. An electro and R&B song with a minimalistic musical bed of a synth bassline, finger snaps, and popping mouth sounds, "Me Too"'s lyrics concern self-love, as Trainor asserts confidence in her looks.

Music critics found the lyrics of "Me Too" difficult to relate to and Trainor's confidence disingenuous, but some praised the track's production. In the United States, the song peaked at number 13 on the Billboard Hot 100 and was certified 3× Platinum by the Recording Industry Association of America. It reached the top 10 and received 4× Platinum certifications in Australia and Canada.

Hannah Lux Davis directed the music video for "Me Too", depicting Trainor partying in a car and traveling through Los Angeles before joining her backup dancers to film a dance sequence. Shortly after its release, the video was removed after she noticed it had been digitally altered to make her waist look smaller; it was reuploaded the following day. Trainor fell while performing the song on The Tonight Show Starring Jimmy Fallon, drawing accusations of staging a marketing stunt. She reprised "Me Too" on television shows such as Good Morning America and The Today Show, and included it in the set list of her concert tours the Untouchable Tour (2016) and the Timeless Tour (2024).

== Background ==
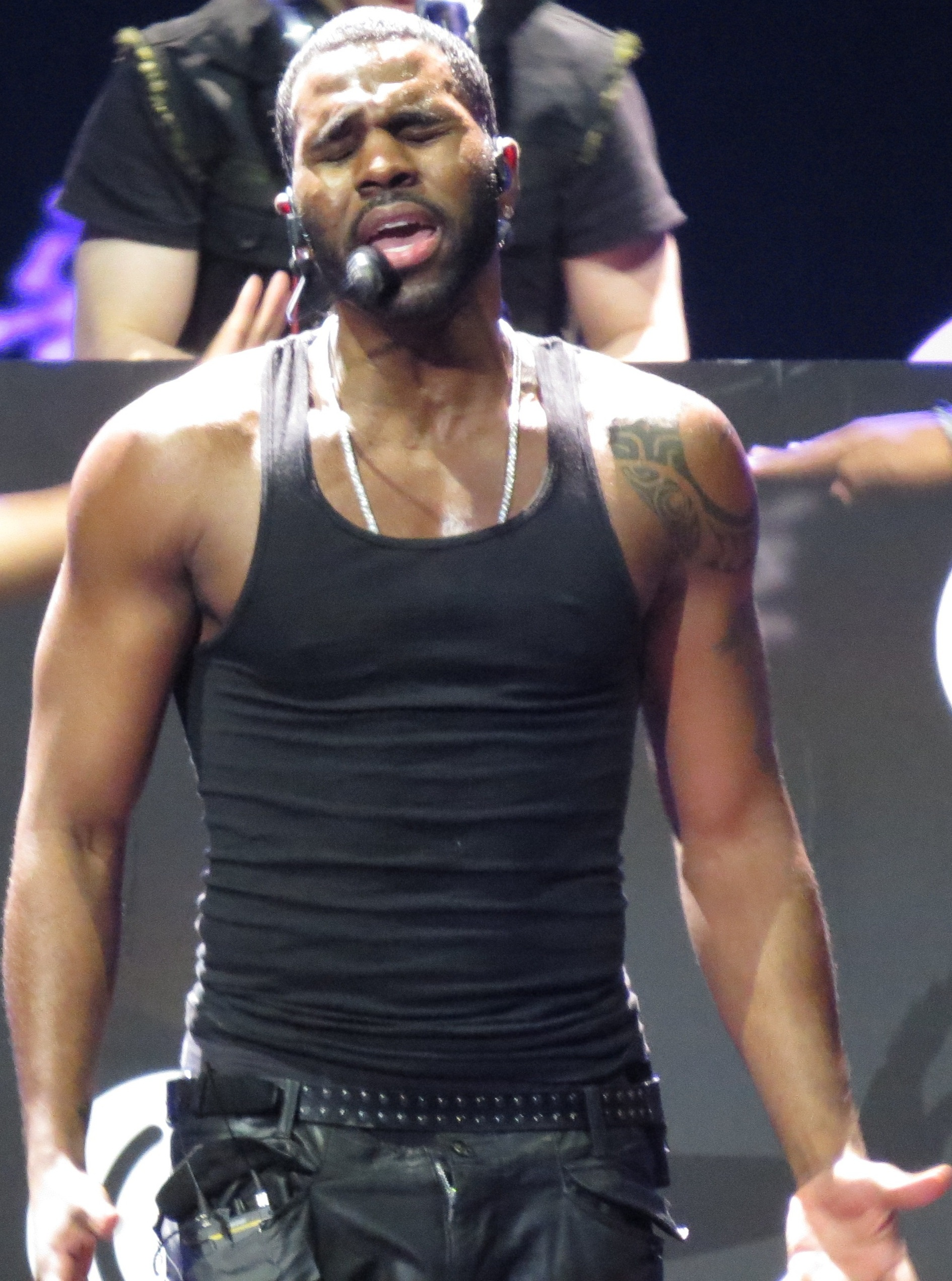
Jason Derulo (pictured in 2013) co-wrote "Me Too".

A fan of the music project Wallpaper, Meghan Trainor began co-writing songs with its frontman, producer Ricky Reed, and his frequent collaborator Jacob Kasher Hindlin, for her second major-label studio album, Thank You (2016). She initially recorded doo-wop songs similar to her debut single, "All About That Bass" (2014). L.A. Reid, the chairman of her label Epic Records, encouraged her to write "a song that every other artist wished they had" because she lacked a proper lead single for the project. Trainor, Reed, and Hindlin wrote the song "No". When Reid heard it, he jumped up and said, "that's what I'm talkin' about!", playing it 29 times in succession. Ultimately, "No" changed the album's direction, as the three started experimenting with new musical styles and produced six more tracks.

Trainor wrote "Me Too" alongside Reed, Hindlin, singer Jason Derulo, and songwriter Peter Svensson. She had previously featured on the track "Painkiller" from Derulo's 2015 album Everything Is 4. He believed Trainor should record "Me Too": "I think that song was perfect for her because it's about loving yourself and not worrying about what haters say. It's just a dope, fun song." Epic Records digitally released "Me Too", as the second single from Thank You, on May 5, 2016. In the United States, the song was serviced to adult contemporary radio stations on May 16, and top 40 radio stations the following day.

== Composition and lyrics ==
"Me Too"
"Me Too", an electro and R&B song, features finger snaps and popping mouth sounds in its instrumentation.

"Me Too" is three minutes and one second long. Reed produced and programmed the song. He plays bass, guitar, and keyboards, and Tom Peyton plays drums. Ethan Shumaker engineered it at Reed's studio in Elysian Park, Los Angeles, Chris Gehringer mastered it at Sterling Sound in New York City, and Manny Marroquin mixed it at the Carriage House studio in Nolensville, Tennessee.

"Me Too" is an electro and R&B song. The song's verses are set to a minimalistic musical bed consisting of a bassline, finger snaps, and popping mouth sounds, followed by an R&B pre-chorus. It has an elastic synth bassline; Brennan Carley of Spin compared it to "Scream & Shout", a 2012 single by Will.i.am and Britney Spears. "Me Too" features some dubstep-influenced beats, and influences of jazz and funk during the chorus and club music in its verses.

"Me Too" is about self-love. In the song's lyrics, Trainor asks herself the question "who's that sexy thing I see over there?", referring to her own reflection in the mirror. She thanks God for waking up with a positive feeling and declares that she cannot help but love herself. In the chorus, Trainor sings: "if I was you, I'd wanna be me too". She pronounces the word "wanna" like "vahna", which PopMatters's Chris Conaton thought sounded like a "faux-Eastern European accent". Trainor proclaims she is a dime piece and sings about how she is considered a VIP at clubs and does not have to pay for her drinks.

== Critical reception ==
Music critics commented on the production of "Me Too", as well as Trainor's performance on it. Spin's Dan Weiss dubbed the song "Will.i.am-goes-Sophie" and compared it to a "vibrant Gap commercial". Jada Yuan of Billboard believed it delicately shifted Trainor's retro image to a more urban R&B style, and she called it "Beyoncé Lite" due to its audacious theme. Writing for MTV News, Hazel Cills opined that the pulsating bass beat of "Me Too" made it well-suited for clubs. Fuse's Shannon Mages wrote that the song would make listeners stomp their feet and head to a dance floor. Conaton thought the minimalistic production in its verses was "quite cool" and contrasted well with its pre-chorus, but he criticized Trainor's affectation during its chorus. Writing for Newsday, Glenn Gamboa compared her performance on "Me Too" to Spears in the 2000s.

The lyrics of "Me Too" drew criticism. Alexa Camp of Slant Magazine called the song a "vacant exercise in positivity" and accused it of "confusing delusional self-importance with self-worth". Michael Cragg of The Guardian believed the bragging in its lyrics was misdirected, and Conaton thought it insulted listeners. Knoxville News Sentinel's Chuck Campbell opined that Trainor's sass on "Me Too" felt insincere. The New York Times' Jon Caramanica believed her proclamation of self-love on the song was "awkward". News.com.au writer Cameron Adams called it one of 2016's worst songs due to its galling lyrics and blamed it for Trainor's commercial decline. (Note: Conaton highlighted "Me Too" as the cause of the commercial underperformance of Thank You and its subsequent singles.) Others were less critical regarding the lyrics. Isabella Biedenharn of Entertainment Weekly likened it to the album track "I Love Me" and described them as "instant confidence-spikers". MTV News's Madeline Roth admitted all listeners may not fully relate to the lyrics of "Me Too", but "its dance-friendly beat will at least have you on your feet". Erin Jensen of USA Today lauded Trainor's boldness and thought the song's titular lyric would be a good life motto for its audiences.

== Commercial performance ==
"Me Too" debuted at number 39 on the US Billboard Hot 100 issued for June 4, 2016. The song peaked at number 13 on the chart in its 11th week. It reached number 4 on the Digital Songs chart, number 21 on Streaming Songs, and number 28 on Radio Songs. "Me Too" received a 3× Platinum certification from the Recording Industry Association of America. In Canada, the song charted at number nine and Music Canada certified it 6× Platinum. It reached number 84 on the UK Singles Chart and earned a Gold certification from the British Phonographic Industry.

In Australia, "Me Too" peaked at number four and received a 6× Platinum certification from the Australian Recording Industry Association in 2023. The song charted within the top 40, at number 1 on Israel's Media Forest TV Airplay Chart, number 2 on Mexico Ingles Airplay, number 8 in Guatemala, number 20 on Mexico's Monitor Latino chart, number 26 in Latvia, number 30 in Hungary, and number 40 in the Czech Republic. It earned a 2× Platinum certification in Brazil, Platinum+Gold in Mexico, Platinum in Poland, and Gold in Denmark, France, Germany, Spain, and Sweden.

== Music video ==
The digital manipulation of Trainor's body (modified version at left) caused controversy and led to the video's removal.

Hannah Lux Davis directed the music video for "Me Too". After Trainor shared several promotional teasers, it was released on May 9, 2016. The video was filmed over a 22-hour period. It has a meta concept, featuring Trainor waking up and preparing to go to a music video shoot. She glances at a Grammy Award kept by her bed and puts on a giraffe onesie in a bathroom. Trainor greets fans and makes her way to a car, in which she parties with her father while drinking a frappuccino and traveling through Los Angeles. This is followed by a dance sequence with her in a blue gown along with backup dancers in teal dresses. In some scenes, Trainor interacts with her entourage in a wardrobe trailer and gets makeup done.

A few hours after its release, Twitter users began pointing out that it had been digitally altered to make Trainor's waist look smaller. When she encountered screenshots from the video on social media, she thought the alterations were made by fans before realizing they were present in the official upload too. Trainor called the staff at Vevo and label heads including Reid and Sylvia Rhone, requesting for it to be taken down. She uploaded a clip explaining the video's removal to fans on Snapchat, in which she stated: "they Photoshopped the crap out of me [...] My waist is not that teeny, I had a bomb waist that night, I don't know why they didn't like my waist, but I didn't approve that video and it went out for the world, so I'm embarrassed." Trainor had asked the editors to conceal her mustache and remove her mole hair, but thought reducing her waist size crossed a line. She edited the video with her family and went through all minute details. Trainor approved a new version which was uploaded the following day. Roth lauded her for still adhering to her beliefs and thought the move reaffirmed her anti-Photoshop message in "All About That Bass".

Some critics thought it was an attempt to generate publicity. Writing for Vox, Caroline Framke speculated the incident was a calculated move to make Trainor appear more sympathetic to audiences ahead of her album being released to streaming services. Anne T. Donahue of MTV News wondered if it was a stunt but added: "it's genius. I mean, not only does body positivity fall in line with Trainor's mantra, having her pull a finished product and condemn it to video hell makes her look like a complete badass." The Independent's Victoria Hesketh believed it was unlikely the incident was premeditated and considered the swift reupload of the video as a small victory: "It arguably turned what could have been a swift curtain call to fairly brief pop-life, into a move of empowerment." She appreciated the issue of digital alteration of women's bodies in the music industry being brought into popular discourse. In an interview with Billboard in July 2016, Trainor denied the accusations: "Not at all. It did get more press, but it wasn't on purpose. The whole thing is embarrassing."

== Live performances and other usage ==
Trainor promoted "Me Too" with appearances on several television shows. On May 12, 2016, she performed the song in a green and black sequin dress and high heels on The Tonight Show Starring Jimmy Fallon. Trainor executed choreography, sang into a decorated microphone, and was accompanied by a backing band. Towards the end, she fell to the ground while trying to grab a hold of the microphone stand. Trainor stayed there in shock for a minute, after which Fallon laid down beside her and joked: "of every single dance move, grabbing the mic is the toughest". She recorded the performance a second time but preferred the one with the fall: "I noticed on the second take my face looked really worried, like, 'Do not fall,' and the performance just wasn't as good. So I told them, 'Take the first one, give them the fall, let 'em have it.'" Trainor began retweeting videos of it soon after it aired, which led The Atlantic's Spencer Kornhaber to speculate that it might be a marketing stunt to generate PR for the release of Thank You. Stereogum's Tom Breihan believed that the fall was probably genuinely accidental due to her ankle-twist, but "she definitely milked it for a minute". Writing for The Independent, Olivia Blair noted Trainor was not the first person to suffer a fall on television, and cited the incidents of Naomi Campbell at the Vivienne Westwood 1993 Fall catwalk and Madonna at the Brit Awards 2015. The "Me Too" performance received positive reviews from some critics: Carley thought Trainor delivered strong vocals, swiftly ameliorating choreography, and handled the fall charismatically; Rolling Stone wrote that she sang with unanticipated ardour and adroit choreography during the performance; Gil Kaufman of Billboard described it as sprightly and praised Trainor for handling the slip-up with grace while smiling and laughing; Maane Khatchatourian of Variety believed the performance was "effortlessly deliver[ed]".

Trainor reprised "Me Too" on Good Morning America the following day, while recovering from the incident: "I'm feeling it today. I'm feeling little bruises everywhere." She sang the song at BBC Radio 1's Big Weekend on May 28, 2016. On June 7, 2016, Trainor performed it during a concert for Sunrise. She reprised "Me Too" on The Today Show on June 21. On July 13, 2016, Trainor sang the song on Charts Center. It was part of her setlist for the Untouchable Tour (2016). Trainor performed "Me Too" on November 22, 2018, while wearing a sparkling jersey and blue trousers, at a Dallas Cowboys and Washington Redskins game which launched The Salvation Army's 128th annual Red Kettle Campaign. She reprised the song during her set for the 2018 iHeartRadio Jingle Ball. Trainor sang it while headlining the Philadelphia Welcome America Festival as part of the 2019 Fourth of July celebrations. On September 13, 2019, she performed "Me Too" as part of her setlist on The Today Show's Citi concert series. Trainor included the song on the set list of her 2024 concert tour, the Timeless Tour.

A mother of two children from California released a parody of "Me Too" in July 2016, about her desire to be alone sometimes and the hardships of motherhood. She auctioned roles in the video to raise funds for local schools. On September 18, 2016, Britney Spears posted a clip to Instagram of herself dancing to "Me Too". Within 24 hours, Trainor reposted the clip and described it as a "dream come true". The Laker Girls performed a dance routine to the song at a Los Angeles Lakers game on March 21, 2017, with Trainor in the audience. "Me Too" appeared on the soundtracks for the 2018 film I Feel Pretty and Brazilian telenovela Pega Pega.

== Credits and personnel ==
Credits are adapted from the liner notes of Thank You.

- Ricky Reed – producer, songwriter, programming, bass, guitar, keyboards
- Meghan Trainor – songwriter
- Jacob Kasher Hindlin – songwriter
- Jason Derulo – songwriter
- Peter Svensson – songwriter
- Tom Peyton – drums
- Ethan Shumaker – engineer
- Chris Gehringer – mastering
- Manny Marroquin – mixing

== Charts ==
=== Weekly charts ===
Weekly chart positions for "Me Too"
| Chart (2016) | Peak position |
|---|---|
| Australia (ARIA) | 4 |
| Austria (Ö3 Austria Top 40) | 60 |
| Belgium (Ultratip Bubbling Under Flanders) | 30 |
| Belgium (Ultratip Bubbling Under Wallonia) | 40 |
| Canada Hot 100 (Billboard) | 9 |
| Canada AC (Billboard) | 32 |
| Canada CHR/Top 40 (Billboard) | 15 |
| Canada Hot AC (Billboard) | 10 |
| Czech Republic Airplay (ČNS IFPI) | 40 |
| Czech Republic Singles Digital (ČNS IFPI) | 61 |
| France (SNEP) | 98 |
| Germany (GfK) | 62 |
| Guatemala (Monitor Latino) | 8 |
| Hungary (Single Top 40) | 30 |
| Ireland (IRMA) | 81 |
| Israel (Media Forest TV Airplay) | 1 |
| Mexico (Monitor Latino) | 20 |
| Mexico (Billboard Ingles Airplay) | 2 |
| New Zealand Heatseekers (Recorded Music NZ) | 10 |
| Slovakia Airplay (ČNS IFPI) | 68 |
| Slovakia Singles Digital (ČNS IFPI) | 58 |
| UK Singles (Official Charts) | 84 |
| US Billboard Hot 100 | 13 |
| US Adult Contemporary (Billboard) | 23 |
| US Adult Pop Airplay (Billboard) | 11 |
| US Dance Club Songs (Billboard) | 28 |
| US Dance Airplay (Billboard) | 33 |
| US Pop Airplay (Billboard) | 12 |

=== Year-end charts ===
Year-end chart positions for "Me Too"
| Chart (2016) | Position |
|---|---|
| Argentina (Monitor Latino) | 57 |
| Australia (ARIA) | 51 |
| Canada (Canadian Hot 100) | 33 |
| US Billboard Hot 100 | 62 |
| US Adult Top 40 (Billboard) | 48 |

== Certifications ==
Certifications for "Me Too"
| Region | Certification | Certified units/sales |
|---|---|---|
| Australia (ARIA) | 6× Platinum | 420,000^{‡} |
| Brazil (Pro-Música Brasil) | 2× Platinum | 120,000^{‡} |
| Canada (Music Canada) | 6× Platinum | 480,000^{‡} |
| Denmark (IFPI Danmark) | Gold | 45,000^{‡} |
| France (SNEP) | Gold | 100,000^{‡} |
| Germany (BVMI) | Gold | 200,000^{‡} |
| Mexico (AMPROFON) | 2× Platinum+Gold | 150,000^{‡} |
| New Zealand (RMNZ) | 2× Platinum | 60,000^{‡} |
| Poland (ZPAV) | Platinum | 50,000^{‡} |
| Spain (Promusicae) | Gold | 30,000^{‡} |
| United Kingdom (BPI) | Gold | 400,000^{‡} |
| United States (RIAA) | 3× Platinum | 3,000,000^{‡} |
Streaming
| Japan (RIAJ) | Gold | 50,000,000^{†} |
| Sweden (GLF) | Gold | 4,000,000^{†} |
^{‡} Sales+streaming figures based on certification alone.^{†} Streaming-only figures based on certification alone.

== Release history ==
Release dates and format(s) for "Me Too"
| Region | Date | Format | Label | Ref. |
|---|---|---|---|---|
| Various | May 5, 2016 | Digital download | Epic | |
| United States | May 16, 2016 | Adult contemporary radio | Epic | |
| United States | May 17, 2016 | Top 40 radio | Epic | |
