= The Untouchable Tour =

2016 concert tour by Meghan Trainor

- Tour by Meghan Trainor
- Promotional poster for tour
- Associated album: Thank You
- Start date: July 14, 2016
- End date: October 15, 2016
- No. of shows: 31
- Box office: $2,018,956

Meghan Trainor concert chronology
- MTrain Tour (2015); The Untouchable Tour (2016); The Timeless Tour (2024)

The Untouchable Tour was the third headlining concert tour by American singer-songwriter Meghan Trainor. It was launched in support of her second major-label studio album Thank You (2016), and consisted of concerts in North America and Europe. The tour was announced in April 2016, with dates being released at the same time. The show was produced by Live Nation Entertainment. The set list featured the majority of the songs from Thank You, all four singles from Trainor's debut major-label studio album Title (2015), "All About That Bass", "Lips Are Movin", "Dear Future Husband", and "Like I'm Gonna Lose You", and a cover of Drake's song "One Dance" (2016). The tour was positively received by most critics.

== Background and development ==
On April 20, 2016, Meghan Trainor announced her third concert tour, The Untouchable Tour, to support her second major-label studio album, Thank You (2016). Tour dates were released on the same day and tickets were released on April 29, 2016. Live Nation Entertainment was announced as the tour's producers, while Lip Smacker, Tampax and Always were the sponsors. The set list included sixteen songs from Thank You, all four singles from Trainor's debut major-label studio album Title (2015): "All About That Bass", "Lips Are Movin", "Dear Future Husband", and "Like I'm Gonna Lose You", and a cover of Drake's song "One Dance" (2016).

== Synopsis ==
Trainor would start the hour and a half long concert with a performance of "Woman Up". She thanked her mother before her performance of "Mom". At her Seattle show, wearing an "elegant, black and glittering" gown, she stated, "My momma couldn't be here tonight because she's probably doing a million things for me, but I wouldn't be here without her. Best mom ever!" A green screen in the backdrop would project a clip of Trainor dancing with her father during her performance of "Dance Like Yo Daddy", for which he would join Trainor on some dates. Pictures of Trainor with her friends were projected on the screen during the "Friends" performance. She would be accompanied by a saxophonist and a trumpet player. Trainor played a ukulele during her performance of "Just a Friend to You". The "Kindly Calm Me Down" performance would incorporate four background dancers. Trainor performed "Like I'm Gonna Lose You", and a cover of Drake's "One Dance" on some dates. The set would include three costume changes. Trainor's band was a seven-piece ensemble: bass, drums, keys, trumpet, sax, and rhythm and lead guitarists.

== Reception ==
Shawn Costa of MassLive praised the show, writing that "performing for a near-capacity crowd, Trainor put on a high-energy show". The tour was ranked sixth on MTV News' list of "16 Concert Tours You Absolutely Can't Miss This Summer". Billboard's William Goodman gave the show a positive review, describing it as an ode to Trainor's friends and family. Lauren Craddock from the same magazine was also favorable, writing that Trainor "packed the house with immense energy and self confidence, engaging with her fans throughout the show". Entertainment Weekly's Kevin O'Donnell gave the show a mixed review, writing that it is "flawlessly executed" but "a little too rooted in Vaudevillian clichés".

Attendance figures were reported for some dates of The Untouchable Tour. The shows at the Chelsea Ballroom on July 20, 2016, and the Greek Theatre two days later were sold out.

== Set list ==
The following set list is from the concert held on July 16, 2016, in Seattle. It does not represent all concerts for the duration of the tour.

1. "Woman Up"
2. "Watch Me Do"
3. "Me Too"
4. "Dear Future Husband"
5. "Lips Are Movin"
6. "Mom"
7. "Dance Like Yo Daddy"
8. "All About That Bass"
9. "Friends"
10. "Good to Be Alive"
11. "Kindly Calm Me Down"
12. "Hopeless Romantic"
13. "Just a Friend to You"
14. "Like I'm Gonna Lose You"
15. "Bang Dem Sticks"
16. "Throwback Love"
17. "I Love Me"
18. "Champagne Problems"
19. "I Won't Let You Down"
20. "One Dance"
21. "Better"
22. "Thank You"
  Encore
23. "NO"

Notes

- During the September 9 show in New York City, Trainor's cover of "One Dance" was omitted.
- During the July 22 show in Los Angeles, Trainor was joined by James Corden for the "Like I'm Gonna Lose You" performance, and "Bang Dem Sticks" was omitted.

== Tour dates ==
List of concerts, showing date, city, country, venue, opening act(s), attendance and revenue
Date (2016)	City	Country	Venue	Opening act(s)	Attendance	Revenue
July 14 (Note: The concert on July 14, 2016, in Nampa, Idaho at Ford Amphitheatre, was originally set to take place in Vancouver, Canada at the PNE Amphitheatre, but was changed for unknown reasons.)	Nampa	United States	Ford Idaho Center Amphitheatre	Hailee Steinfeld; Common Kings	—	—
July 16	Seattle	United States	WaMu Theater	Hailee Steinfeld; Common Kings	—	—
July 18	San Jose	United States	Event Center Arena	Hailee Steinfeld	—	—
July 20	Las Vegas	United States	Chelsea Ballroom	Hailee Steinfeld; Common Kings	2,165 / 2,165	$122,342
July 22	Los Angeles	United States	Greek Theatre	Hailee Steinfeld; Common Kings	5,503 / 5,503	$289,637
July 24	Phoenix	United States	Comerica Theatre	Hailee Steinfeld; Common Kings	—	—
July 26	Denver	United States	Bellco Theatre	Hailee Steinfeld; Common Kings	—	—
July 29	The Woodlands	United States	Cynthia Woods Mitchell Pavilion	Hailee Steinfeld; Common Kings	—	—
July 31	Allen	United States	Allen Event Center	Hailee Steinfeld; Common Kings	—	—
August 2	Rogers	United States	Walmart Arkansas Music Pavilion	Hailee Steinfeld; Common Kings	—	—
August 4	Atlanta	United States	Chastain Park Amphitheater	Hailee Steinfeld; Common Kings	—	—
August 6	Nashville	United States	Ascend Amphitheater	Hailee Steinfeld; Common Kings	—	—
August 8	Rochester Hills	United States	Meadow Brook Music Festival	Hailee Steinfeld; Common Kings	—	—
August 10	Rosemont	United States	Rosemont Theatre	Hailee Steinfeld; Common Kings	—	—
August 12 (Note: The concert on August 12, 2016, in Des Moines, Iowa at Iowa State Fair Grandstand was a part of the Iowa State Fair.)	Des Moines	United States	Iowa State Fair Grandstand	Hailee Steinfeld; Common Kings	—	—
August 13 (Note: The concert on August 13, 2016, in Springfield, Illinois at Illinois State Fairgrounds Grandstand was a part of the Illinois State Fair.)	Springfield	United States	Illinois State Fairgrounds Grandstand	Hailee Steinfeld; Common Kings	—	—
August 30	Toronto	Canada	Molson Canadian Amphitheatre	Hailee Steinfeld; Common Kings	—	—
September 1 (Note: The concert on September 1, 2016, in Port Hawkesbury, Canada at Port Hawkesbury Civic Centre was a part of the Air Miles Detour.)	Port Hawkesbury	Canada	Port Hawkesbury Civic Centre	Hailee Steinfeld; Common Kings	—	—
September 3 (Note: The concert on September 3, 2016, in Allentown, Pennsylvania at Allentown Fairgrounds Grandstand was a part of the Great Allentown Fair.)	Allentown	United States	Allentown Fairgrounds	Hailee Steinfeld; Common Kings	—	—
September 6	Vienna	United States	Filene Center	Hailee Steinfeld; Common Kings	—	—
September 8	New York City	United States	Radio City Music Hall	Hailee Steinfeld; Common Kings	11,868 / 11,868	$617,689
September 9	New York City	United States	Radio City Music Hall	Hailee Steinfeld; Common Kings	11,868 / 11,868	$617,689
September 11	Pittsburgh	United States	Petersen Events Center	Hailee Steinfeld; Common Kings	—	—
September 14	North Charleston	United States	North Charleston Coliseum	Hailee Steinfeld; Common Kings	—	—
September 16	Miami	United States	Klipsch Amphitheatre	Hailee Steinfeld; Common Kings	4,078 / 4,695	$141,774
September 18	Orlando	United States	CFE Arena	Hailee Steinfeld	6,230 / 6,515	$258,079
September 20	Greenville	United States	Bon Secours Wellness Arena	Hailee Steinfeld; Common Kings	5,158 / 5,501	$220,367
September 22	Uncasville	United States	Mohegan Sun Arena	Hailee Steinfeld; Common Kings	6,692 / 7,097	$369,068
September 24	Boston	United States	Blue Hills Bank Pavilion	Hailee Steinfeld; Common Kings	—	—
September 25	Boston	United States	Blue Hills Bank Pavilion	Hailee Steinfeld; Common Kings	—	—
October 15 (Note: The concert on October 15, 2016, in Madrid at Barclaycard Center was a part of the Coca-Cola Music Experience.)	Madrid	Spain	Barclaycard Center	—	—	—
Total					41,694 / 43,344 (96.2%)	$2,018,956
