= Meghan Trainor =

American singer-songwriter (born 1993)

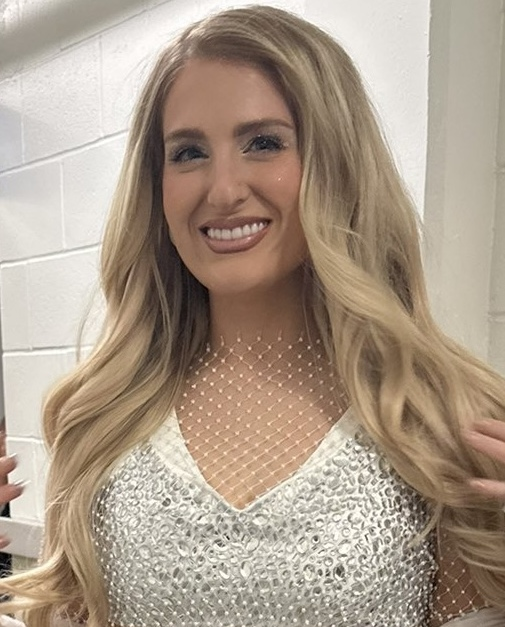
- Trainor in 2024
- Born: Meghan Elizabeth Trainor; December 22, 1993 (age 32); Nantucket, Massachusetts, U.S.
- Occupations: Singer-songwriter; television personality
- Years active: 2009–present
- Spouse: Daryl Sabara (m. 2018)
- Children: 3
- Awards: Full list
- Musical career
- Genres: Pop; R&B; doo-wop; blue-eyed soul
- Instruments: Vocals; guitar; ukulele; keyboards; piano; trumpet
- Works: Discography; songs
- Label: Epic
- Website: meghan-trainor.com

Signature
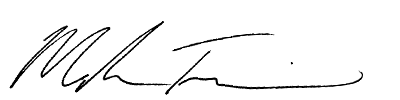

Meghan Elizabeth Trainor (born December 22, 1993) is an American singer-songwriter and television personality. She rose to prominence after signing with Epic Records in 2014 and releasing her debut single "All About That Bass", which reached number one on the U.S. Billboard Hot 100 chart and sold 11 million copies worldwide. Trainor has released seven studio albums with the label and has received various accolades, including a Grammy Award, four ASCAP Pop Music Awards, and two Billboard Music Awards.

Trainor became interested in music at a young age; she recorded three independently released acoustic albums and began writing and producing songs for other artists from 2013. Trainor made her major-label debut with the pop and blue-eyed soul record Title (2015), which debuted at number one on the U.S. Billboard 200 and spawned the top-10 singles "Lips Are Movin" and "Like I'm Gonna Lose You". Her dance-pop and R&B follow-up Thank You (2016) and its lead single "No" both reached number three on their respective charts. In 2020, Trainor ventured into funk on Treat Myself and holiday music on A Very Trainor Christmas. She followed these with the doo-wop and bubblegum pop albums Takin' It Back (2022) and Timeless (2024); the former produced the single "Made You Look", which reached the top five in several countries. Trainor's subsequent record, Toy with Me (2026), blends contemporary trends with retro influences.

Trainor's lyrics frequently include themes of womanhood, body image, and personal empowerment; however, at times, they have been criticized for being anti-feminist. Her music is influenced by the popular music of the 1950s, and blends the genres pop, R&B, doo-wop, and blue-eyed soul. Outside of the music industry, Trainor has had voice roles in the animated films Smurfs: The Lost Village (2017) and Playmobil: The Movie (2019). She served as a judge on the television talent shows The Four: Battle for Stardom (2018), The Voice UK (2020), and Australian Idol (2023).

== Early life ==
Meghan Elizabeth Trainor was born on December 22, 1993, in Nantucket, Massachusetts, to jewelers Kelli (née Jekanowski) and Gary Trainor. She has an older brother named Ryan and a younger brother named Justin. She began singing at age six, at a Methodist church with her father who was a music teacher and organist. Trainor's family encouraged her to pursue her musical interests and she had told her father she wanted to become a recording artist. She began writing songs and recording them using the digital audio workstation software GarageBand. Trainor started with her own arrangement of the song "Heart and Soul" (1938). According to her mother, Trainor "did a lot [of playing] by ear", and played music without formal training. Her father wanted her to explore every musical genre. At age 12, Trainor began performing as part of the cover band Island Fusion, which also included her aunt, younger brother, and father. They performed soca music as well as Trainor's own compositions. She was in the group for four years, singing and playing piano, guitar, and bongo drums. They would play Bob Marley covers in bars and even opened for the Jamaican singer Beenie Man. By age 13, Trainor had written her first original song, "Give Me a Chance".

Trainor and her family left Nantucket when she was in the eighth grade, temporarily relocating to Orleans, Massachusetts, before moving to North Eastham. She attended Nauset Regional High School and studied guitar, played trumpet, and sang in a jazz band for three years, and was a substitute cheerleader. While she was a teenager, Trainor's parents nudged her to attend songwriting conventions and took her to venues at which production companies were searching for new artists and songwriters. At age 15, she took guitar lessons from former NRBQ member Johnny Spampinato. During this time, Trainor used Logic Studio to record and produce her compositions and later worked independently in a home studio built by her parents. She also attended summer music education programs in Boston at Berklee College of Music in 2009 and 2010 to further develop her music skills.

== Career ==
=== 2009–2013: Career beginnings ===
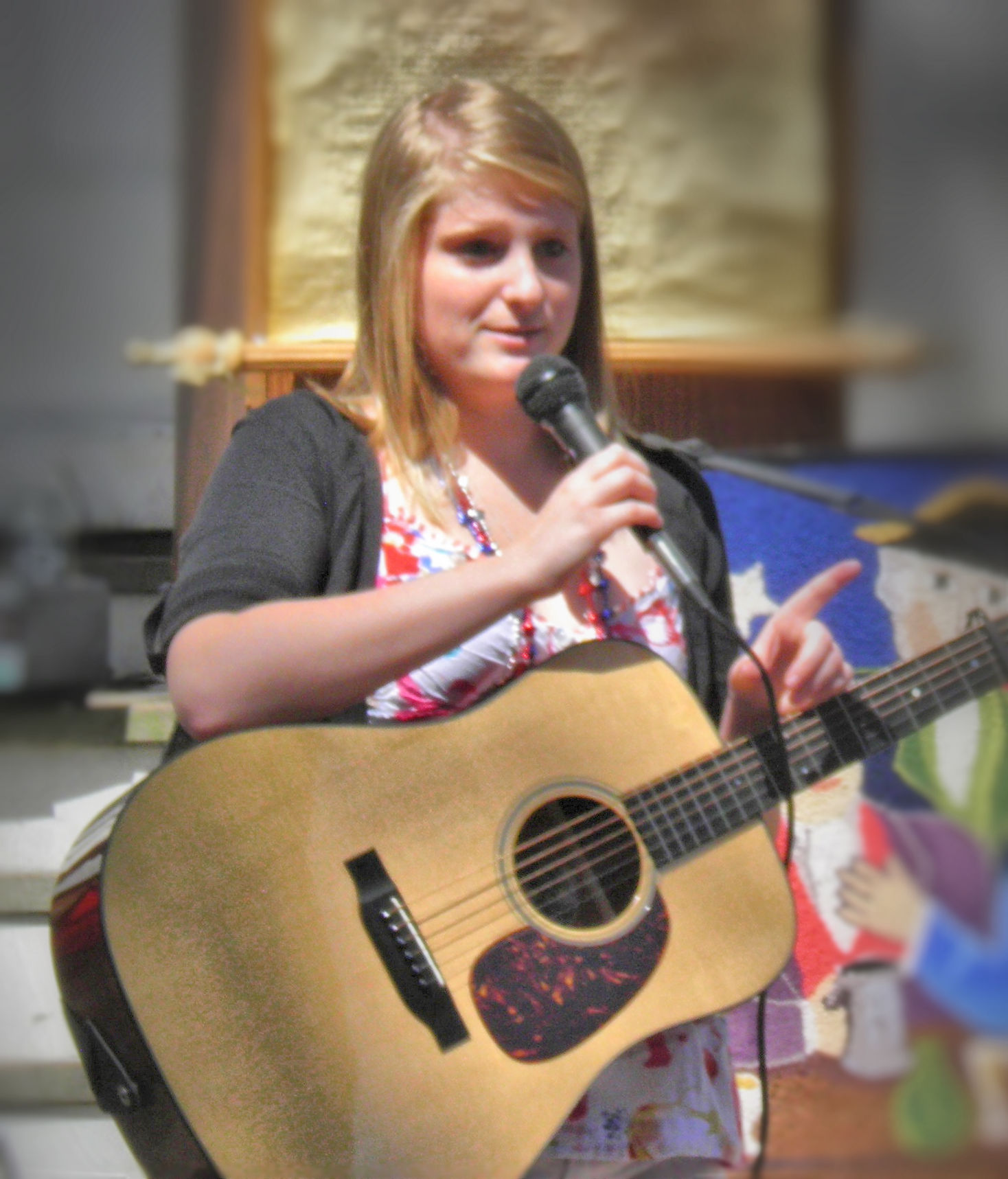
Trainor singing "Take Care of Our Soldiers" at Nantucket United Methodist Church, July 2010

Between the ages of 15 and 17, Trainor independently released three albums of material she had written, recorded, performed, and produced. She enrolled in the Summer Performance Program at the Berklee College of Music during the mid-year months of 2009 and 2010. Her debut album, Meghan Trainor, was released on December 25, 2009. Trainor released the song "Take Care of Our Soldiers" on April 16, 2010. She donated all of the proceeds from the single to the United Service Organizations (USO) and Cape Cod Cares for Our Troops. The following year, Trainor released the acoustic albums I'll Sing with You and Only 17.

At a music conference in Nashville, Trainor introduced herself to former NRBQ member Al Anderson. He was reportedly impressed by Trainor's songwriting and referred her to his publisher Carla Wallace of Nashville-based music publishing firm Big Yellow Dog Music. Though Trainor had been offered a full scholarship to the Berklee College of Music, she pursued her songwriting career and signed with Big Yellow Dog Music in 2012. She began her career as a songwriter-for-hire for other artists. Her father said, "She thought she was one of the chubby girls who would never be an artist". Trainor graduated from Nauset Regional High School in 2012. She released her song "Who I Wanna Be" for digital download on April 24, 2012.

Throughout 2013, Trainor traveled to Nashville, New York City and Los Angeles, where she wrote and helped produce country and pop songs. She sang lead and background vocals on demos for other artists and her vocals were occasionally used on the final recordings. Trainor co-wrote the song "In the Sun", which was released as a single by Danish artist Aya Katrine in May 2013. In June 2013, Trainor met producer Kevin Kadish in Nashville via Wallace and a mutual friend. Both Kadish and Trainor liked retro style music and began recording together that month. Trainor later became frustrated with commuting from Nantucket to Los Angeles for songwriting sessions. Her parents did not want her to relocate as it would be expensive so in November 2013, Trainor decided to relocate to Nashville instead. There she wrote songs for a number of acts including Hunter Hayes, Rascal Flatts, R5, and Sabrina Carpenter.

=== 2014–2015: Breakthrough with Title ===
Kadish and Trainor co-wrote "All About That Bass" in November 2013. The song was inspired by Trainor's struggle to accept her appearance and her feelings of insecurity about looking at pictures of herself. The duo offered the song to several record labels, all of which rejected the doo-wop song because it was not "synth-y, pop-y" enough. Trainor later met Paul Pontius, the A&R agent for Epic Records, and performed "All About That Bass" for him. Pontius arranged a meeting with label chairman L.A. Reid, during which Trainor performed the song for Reid, who signed her 20 minutes later. Subsequently, Trainor hired Troy Carter as her manager and released "All About That Bass" on June 30, 2014. The song reached number one in 58 countries, its music video went viral, and it sold 11 million units worldwide. It spent eight consecutive weeks atop the Billboard Hot 100 and was certified diamond by the Recording Industry Association of America (RIAA). Media outlets including Vice, The Fader and Complex accused Trainor of cultural appropriation in "All About That Bass", The Seattle Times' Paul de Barros commented that Trainor affects an accent akin to that of a "young, urban, African American woman" in the song, while its lyric "bringing booty back/Go ahead and tell them skinny bitches that" was criticized by Vox's Kelsey McKinney for dismissing people of smaller body types. Trainor justified her use of the lyric by stating "just kidding, I know even you think you are fat" right after it.

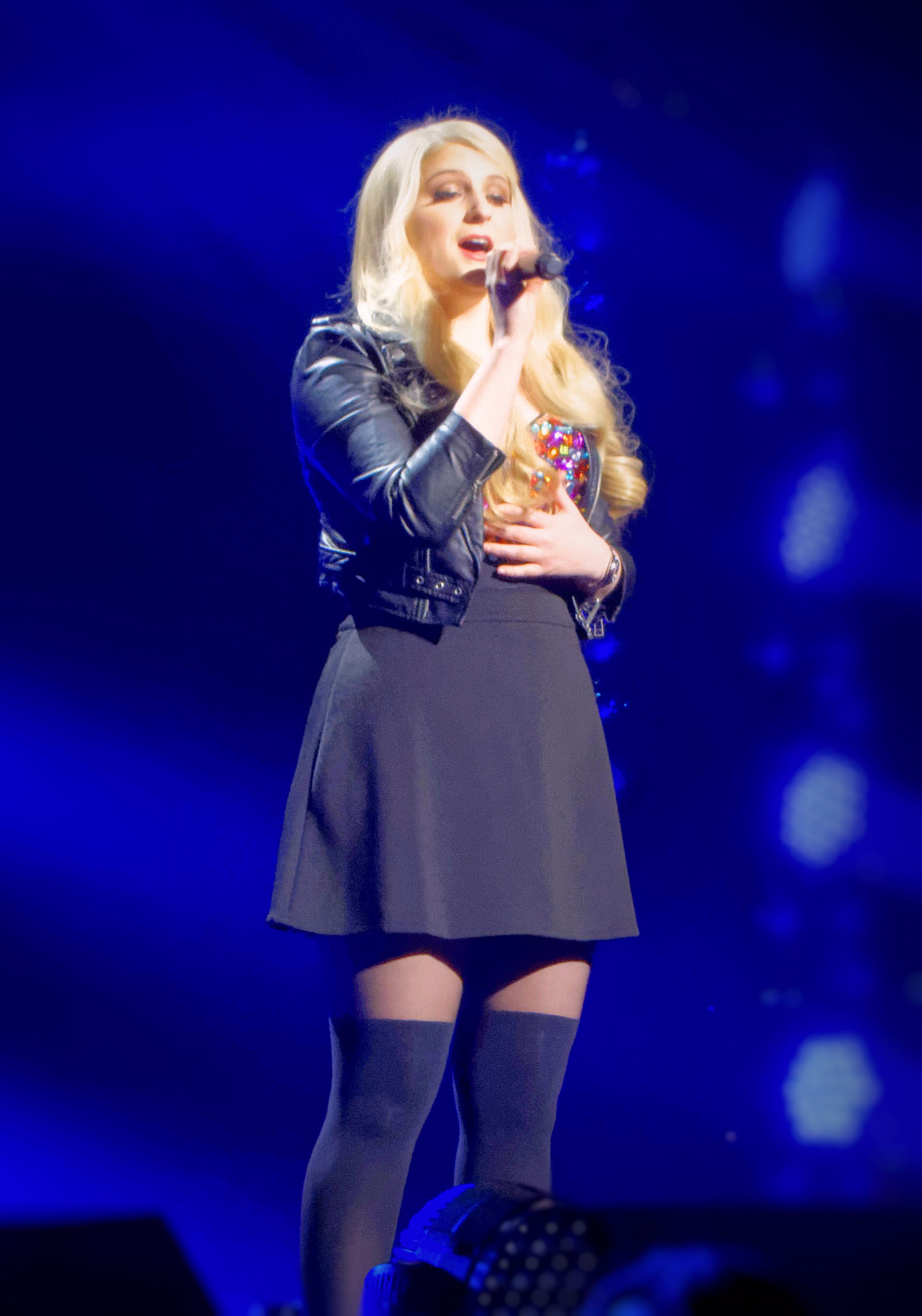
Trainor performing in Philadelphia during the Jingle Ball Tour 2014

Trainor's debut extended play (EP), Title, was released on September 9, 2014. Trainor and Kadish composed its songs. The EP peaked at number 15 on the US Billboard 200 and at number 17 on the Canadian Albums Chart. Stereogum and Out noted the EP proved Trainor could outlast the success of her debut single. Music critics including McKinney and Slate's L.V. Anderson wrote that the EP's title track and "All About That Bass" are anti-feminist; Anderson stated that the songs send the message that "a woman's worth is defined by men" and set a negative example for Trainor's young female audience. Trainor responded to the anti-feminism claims by commenting, "I don't know, man! I just wrote a fun song about loving your booty and loving your body!" She released her second single "Lips Are Movin", a retro song in a similar vein to its predecessor, on October 21 that year. The song peaked at number four on the Billboard Hot 100, also reaching the top 10 in Australia, Canada, and New Zealand. Billboard ranked her as the fourth Top New Artist of the year placing her 12th on their annual list of the most powerful people in music under the age of 21.

Trainor's three self-released albums were removed from sale in the build-up to the release of her major-label debut studio album Title, which replaced her EP of the same name on the iTunes Store, and was released on January 9, 2015. At Metacritic, which assigns a weighted average score out of 100 to reviews from mainstream critics, it received an average score of 59 based on 13 reviews, indicating "mixed or average reviews". The album debuted at number one on the US Billboard 200, earning a triple platinum certification from the RIAA. It was the ninth best-selling album of 2015 worldwide, with 1.8 million copies sold according to IFPI. The album's later singles "Dear Future Husband" and "Like I'm Gonna Lose You" reached the Hot 100's top 20, and the latter reached number one on the Australian Singles Chart. The music video for "Dear Future Husband", which depicts Trainor scrubbing a kitchen floor, drew criticism and online critics labeled it as "sexist" and "anti-feminist" for its portrayal of traditional gender stereotypes. She responded to the criticism by saying; "but no, I don't believe I was [being sexist]. I think I was just writing my song to my future husband out there, wherever he is". Trainor performed a duet with Charlie Puth on his debut single "Marvin Gaye", which was released in February 2015.

Trainor began her first headlining concert tour, That Bass Tour, on February 11, 2015, with Australian band Sheppard as the opening act. The album was also promoted through the "MTrain Tour", with Puth and Life of Dillon as opening acts. The tour was set to begin on July 3 but Trainor was diagnosed with a vocal cord hemorrhage that month and her medical team ordered her to undergo complete vocal rest, delaying the first two dates of the tour. In July, she announced that she was writing the song "Better When I'm Dancin'" for The Peanuts Movie soundtrack (2015). On August 11, 2015, Trainor announced the cancellation of the remainder of her North American tour and said she would undergo surgery "to finally fix this once and for all". On September 1, 2015, she confirmed that she had successfully gone through the surgery and would need a six-week recovery period before performing again. Trainor appeared as a musical guest on the third season of the American television sitcom Undateable. In late 2015, American singer Who Is Fancy released the single "Boys Like You", which features her and Ariana Grande. Trainor won the Grammy Award for Best New Artist at the 58th Annual Grammy Awards.

=== 2016–2017: Thank You ===
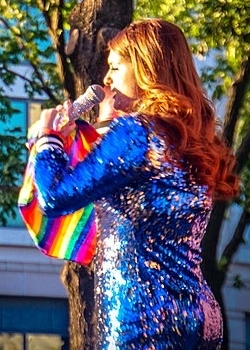
Trainor performing in Washington, D.C. during Capital Pride in June 2016

Trainor told E! Online on January 7, 2016, she had almost finished working on her second major-label studio album Thank You. She told MTV News the album was influenced by the music of Elvis Presley, Aretha Franklin, and Bruno Mars, and includes a collaboration between her and R. City. The album's first single "No" was produced by Ricky Reed and was released on March 4, 2016. The R&B song peaked at number three on the Billboard Hot 100. Shortly after the release of "No", Trainor released the promotional singles "Watch Me Do", "I Love Me", "Better" (featuring American rapper Yo Gotti), and "Mom", on which Trainor's mother appears. The second single from the album, "Me Too", was released on May 5; the accompanying video was released four days later but removed the same day because of unapproved digital manipulation of Trainor's body. An unedited version of the video was released the next day. The song peaked at number 13 on the Billboard Hot 100. A performance of the song on The Tonight Show Starring Jimmy Fallon drew attention when Trainor fell to the floor while trying to catch hold of a microphone stand.

Thank You was released on May 6, 2016. The album received mixed reviews, resulting in a Metacritic score of 60 based on 10 of them, and debuted at number three on the US Billboard 200; it was certified platinum in the US for sales in excess of a million units. In July, Trainor embarked on The Untouchable Tour in support of it, with Hailee Steinfeld and Common Kings as opening acts. "Better" was released as the album's third single in August 2016, and received a music video that includes a cameo from Beau Bridges. Trainor appeared on three other artists' songs in 2016, "Forgive Me Father" from DJ Khaled's album Major Key, "Someday" from Michael Bublé's album Nobody but Me, and "Baby, It's Cold Outside" from Brett Eldredge's album Glow. She co-wrote multiple songs that year, including Jennifer Lopez's "Ain't Your Mama" and "You Gotta Not" from Little Mix's album Glory Days. On February 24, 2017, Trainor released the single "I'm a Lady", which she recorded for the film Smurfs: The Lost Village, in which she also voiced a character called Smurfmelody.

=== 2018–2021: The Love Train, Treat Myself and A Very Trainor Christmas ===
In December 2017, Fox announced Trainor as one of the judges on the show The Four: Battle for Stardom, along with Sean Combs, DJ Khaled and Charlie Walk. The program's first two seasons were broadcast in 2018. Trainor competed against singer Shania Twain in an episode of TBS's show Drop the Mic, which aired in January 2018; both were declared winners. Trainor's third major-label studio album, Treat Myself, was scheduled for release on August 31, 2018, but was delayed because Trainor wanted to write and record more songs for it. Its lead single "No Excuses" was released in March 2018 and peaked at number 46 on the Billboard Hot 100. The songs "Let You Be Right" and "Can't Dance" were released as singles two months later. "All the Ways" was released on June 20, 2018, and the title track was made available on July 20, 2018. The same year, Trainor appeared on Jason Mraz's song "More than Friends".

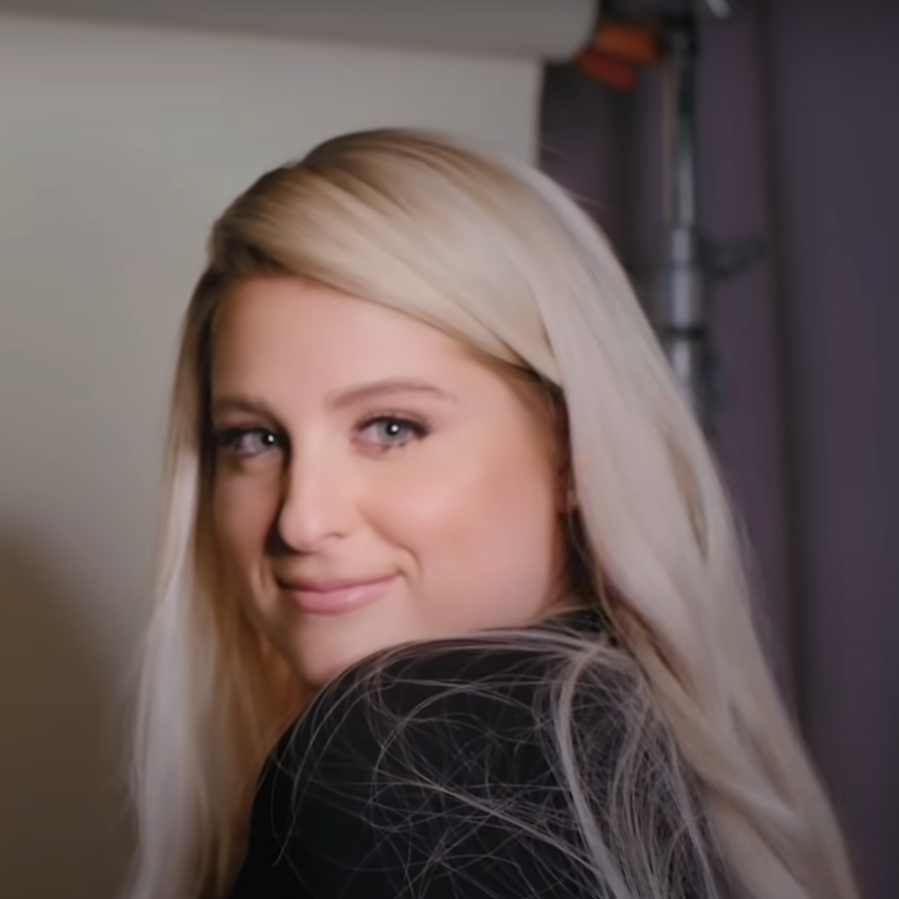
Trainor in 2020

In collaboration with Sigala and Ella Eyre, Trainor released the single "Just Got Paid" which features American rapper French Montana. The song reached number 11 on the UK Singles Chart, number 7 in Scotland, and number 12 in Ireland. Trainor and Sean Paul appeared on a remix of CNCO's song "Hey DJ" later that year. Trainor launched The Salvation Army's 128th annual Red Kettle Campaign on November 22, 2018, performing at a Dallas Cowboys and Washington Redskins game. Treat Myself was later given a January 2019 release date but was not released until January 31, 2020. "All the Ways" was released to hot adult contemporary radio in February 2019 as a single. That month, Trainor also released an EP, The Love Train, which was promoted through music videos and includes "All the Ways". She was a headliner, along with Years & Years, for the 2019 Los Angeles Pride festival.

Trainor recorded the songs "Badass Woman" and "Run Like the River" for the 2019 films The Hustle and Playmobil: The Movie, respectively. She also voiced a fairy godmother in Playmobil: The Movie. In September 2019, ITV announced Trainor would join will.i.am, Sir Tom Jones, and Olly Murs as a coach for the ninth season of The Voice UK, which premiered in 2020. She released "Wave" as the second single from Treat Myself, on September 27, 2019. The album was further promoted with the promotional singles "Workin' On It", "Evil Twin", and "Blink". Trainor wrote enough material for four albums while trying to adapt to new trends in the music industry, Treat Myself was released on January 31, 2020, along with its third single "Nice to Meet Ya" which features Nicki Minaj, to mixed reviews which resulted in a Metacritic score of 51 based on four of them. Treat Myself debuted at number 25 on the US Billboard 200 and "Nice to Meet Ya" debuted at number 89 on the Billboard Hot 100. Trainor released a deluxe version of the album in July 2020, preceded by the single "Make You Dance" (2020). She released a holiday album, A Very Trainor Christmas, on October 30, 2020. In March 2021, she signed an overall deal with NBCUniversal, which includes her starring in a comedy series. On September 15, 2021, Workin' on It, a podcast co-hosted by Trainor and Ryan and distributed by the iHeartPodcast network, premiered.

=== 2022–2024: Takin' It Back ===
Trainor released "Bad for Me", which features Teddy Swims, as the lead single from her fifth studio album on June 24, 2022. On the day preceding its release, she revealed the album cover along with the title Takin' It Back; it was released on October 21, 2022. The album debuted at number 16 on the US Billboard 200. On September 28, 2022, Australia's Seven Network announced that Trainor will serve as a judge on Australian Idol in 2023. "Made You Look" was released as the second single from the album and became her first UK Singles Chart top-10 single since "Marvin Gaye". The song peaked within the top five in countries including Ireland, Australia, and New Zealand and reached number 11 on the Billboard Hot 100.

In 2023, Trainor announced her first book, Dear Future Mama, which was released on April 25. Kris Jenner appeared in the music video for her single "Mother" (2023), from the deluxe edition of Takin' It Back. Trainor released collaborations with several other artists that year: "Alright" with Australian singer Sam Fischer in June, "Chicken Little" with American singer Spencer Sutherland in July, and "Mr Right" with English singer Mae Stephens in August. Trainor featured on Jason Derulo's song "Hands on Me" in October, with Paris Hilton making an appearance in its music video. She released "Wrap Me Up", a Christmas duet with Jimmy Fallon, the following month, which reached number 92 on the Canadian Hot 100 and number four on the Bubbling Under Hot 100.

=== 2024–present: Timeless and Toy with Me ===
On March 14, 2024, Trainor and T-Pain released the song "Been Like This" as the lead single from her sixth major-label studio album, Timeless (2024). The song charted at number 40 in the United Kingdom and number 51 in Ireland. Trainor and Fallon contributed the song "Sweet Morning Heat" to the Netflix film Unfrosted (2024) in April 2024. The music video for Timeless's second single, "To the Moon" (2024), featured appearances by Sabara, their oldest son Riley, Niecy Nash, and the influencers Chris Olsen and Brookie and Jessie. The album was released on June 7, 2024, and peaked at number 27 on the US Billboard 200, number 12 on the UK Albums Chart, and number 23 on the Australian Albums Chart.

Initially waiting for one of the songs to gain popularity on TikTok, Epic Records sent "Whoops" to radio stations as the third single on June 24. A music video for the song was released on June 10, 2024, depicting her dancing in an empty room and destroying furniture with a baseball bat. The song "Whoops" charted at number 94 in the UK, while "I Wanna Thank Me" reached number 86 on the UK Singles Chart. In July 2024, Trainor collaborated with Paul Russell on the song "Slippin'" and with Hilton on the song "Chasin'". In support of Timeless, she embarked on her first headlining concert tour in over seven years, the Timeless Tour, in September 2024, with Natasha Bedingfield, Olsen, Russell, and Ryan serving as special guests.

On November 12, 2025, Trainor released "Still Don't Care" as the lead single for her seventh studio album, Toy with Me, which was released on April 24, 2026. Trainor released "Get in Girl" as the second single from the album on February 13, 2026, and issued the third single, "Shimmer", on the same day as Toy with Me.

== Artistry ==
=== Influences ===
During her childhood, Trainor's father introduced her to 1950s music, doo-wop, jazz, and the work of James Brown. She grew up listening to soca and Caribbean music, and credits 1950s music, soca, and the music of Frank Sinatra for influencing her blend of hip hop and pop music. Trainor had been introduced to soca at the age of seven when her aunt married Trinidadian soca singer Burton Toney. As a songwriter, she has been influenced by Sinatra's repertoire, saying, "No one writes like that anymore, because it's hard". She has described Stevie Wonder and Phil Collins as inspirations, and has cited Bruno Mars as one of her biggest influences. Trainor considers doo-wop the "catchiest stuff" and has stated that she wants to write a song in the vein of The Chordettes' "Lollipop" (1958). She has credited Beyoncé as "the one performer [she] stud[ies] a lot". Trainor has also cited artists like the Backstreet Boys, Ariana Grande, Jason Mraz, and T-Pain as influences on the "upbeat and happy" nature of her music. Aretha Franklin and Elvis Presley influenced Thank You, whereas its lead single "No" draws inspiration from Britney Spears, Christina Aguilera, Destiny's Child, and NSYNC.

=== Musical style and themes ===
Trainor is a singer-songwriter. Her music has been described as pop, R&B, doo-wop, and blue-eyed soul. Her debut EP Title is composed of throwback-style sound and "1950s doo wop-inspired songs that straddle the line between modern R&B and melodic pop". Her hook-laden songwriting style has been likened to that of Brill Building composers such as Gerry Goffin, Carole King, Ellie Greenwich, and Jeff Barry; while the sound of her debut EP has been compared to that of American indie pop singer-songwriters Jenny Lewis and Neko Case, and the "retro-girl-group" sound of her debut single to that of 1960s singers such as Betty Everett and Eydie Gormé. The album Title is a fusion of girl group pop and old-school hip hop and Thank You is an R&B album with dance-pop elements, while Trainor incorporated electronic dance music influences and funk on Treat Myself. She pursued a doo-wop and bubblegum pop sound on Takin' It Back and Timeless. Trainor plays a variety of instruments: bass, guitar, ukulele, keyboard, trumpet, percussion, and piano. According to Trainor, a song's melody is more important than its lyrics. Other genres in which she composes include country, hip hop, reggae and soca, but she prefers doo-wop and reggae.

Trainor's lyrics frequently refer to womanhood, body image, and personal empowerment. Billboard's Ashley Lee wrote that since receiving controversy for the lyrics of "All About That Bass", Trainor began writing "more inclusive" songs about body positivity, citing "Me Too" and the Thank You track "Woman Up" (2016) as examples. The album Title explores themes like heartbreak, one-night stands, relationships, and sex. According to Slant Magazine's Alexa Camp, Trainor continued to peddle a "myopic, commercialized brand of feminism" with Thank You. Trainor incorporated empowerment as a lyrical theme on Treat Myself, and also continued the theme of feminism with its lyrics; the latter drew criticism from PopMatters' Jessica Brant. Takin' It Back revolved around the concepts of motherhood and self-acceptance, and Timeless had a message of self-empowerment and women's empowerment, inspired by Trainor's family, motherhood, and experiences in the music industry, presenting a feminist point of view on dating and issues like societal misogyny.

Trainor's voice type is contralto and her vocals have been described as "soulful" and "highly resonant", as well as "a reedy cross" between those of Katy Perry and Taylor Swift. Chris DeVille of Stereogum said Trainor is "a very capable singer" and that she "project[s] lots of character and emotion within a relatively limited range". Writing for Canadian Business, James Cowan compared the harmonies in Trainor's music to those of 1960s female groups. MTV News' Carvell Wallace wrote that the singer has charismatic vocals, her relatability is part of her appeal, and one can "imagine a drunken bachelorette party having a transcendent sing-along to [her music] in the back of a rented stretch Hummer". He also criticized Trainor for using African-American English. Trainor has said that her accent is "the Gary Trainor thing", and that her father is "very soulful" and emulates Brown sometimes.

== Public image and personal life ==
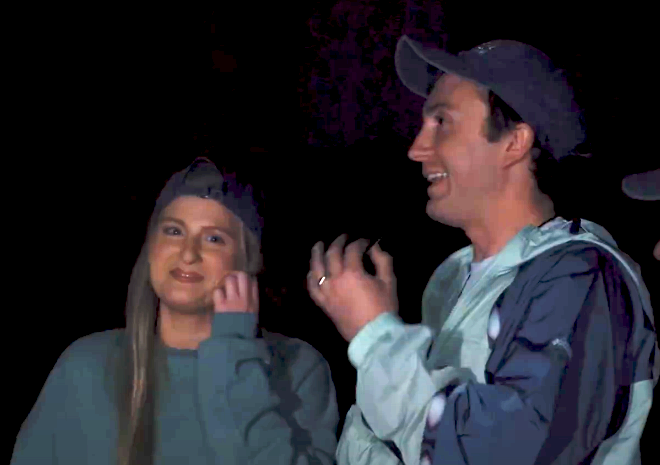
Trainor and husband Daryl Sabara in 2022, about to enter the reportedly haunted Preston School of Industry near Ione, California

Rolling Stone described Trainor as 2014's "Most Unlikely Pop Star". Following the release of "All About That Bass", Billboard's Andrew Hampp reported that Trainor had "become a model of self-acceptance for kids across the globe". The Guardian's Caroline Sullivan called Trainor "the poster girl for the larger woman" and "pop's emblem for self-acceptance". Billboard included her in its list of "14 Musicians With Body Positive Messages" while MTV Australia stated she has "always stood by what she believes in and attempted to promote body positivity for all women". In March 2015, Trainor partnered with plus-size retailer FullBeauty Brands as a consultant for the creation of clothing for women with varying body types. According to Billboard's Jada Yuan, Trainor's image is defined by her "curves" though she is not "curvy" like Nicki Minaj and Kim Kardashian but "she's not model-thin like many other stars". The author described Trainor's use of social media as "upbeat to goofy, with little soul baring or soapbox lecturing".

Trainor is a feminist. Early in her career, some writers criticized Trainor's lyrics as anti-feminist, arguing that they portrayed outdated gender roles and encouraged women to base their self-worth on men's approval. Trainor did not initially identify as a feminist in a 2014 Billboard interview, but two years later she embraced the label. In a 2020 interview with The Independent, Trainor explained she had been "just ... stupid and young", and did not identify as a feminist due to her mother's advice that she should not claim to be something if she did not understand the word, as she had thought feminists were "those people that hate [her]". In April 2023, she attracted controversy after making negative remarks about teachers and announcing that she would homeschool her children on her podcast; she later apologized for these remarks.

Trainor met actor Daryl Sabara in 2014 at a house party in Los Angeles and they began dating in July 2016. The couple were engaged on December 22, 2017, and married one year later on Trainor's 25th birthday. On February 8, 2021, she gave birth to their first child, a boy. On July 1, 2023, she gave birth to their second son. On January 20, 2026, she announced the birth of their third child and first daughter who was born via surrogate two days earlier on January 18, 2026.

== Other ventures ==
=== Philanthropy ===
Trainor has partnered with the American Cancer Society, and made public appearances in charity events such as We Day California, as well as The Hollywood Reporter's 24th annual Women in Entertainment Breakfast. In 2018, the British media company Global's in-house charity Make Some Noise invited Trainor to present a £77,200 check to the charity Reach. During the COVID-19 pandemic, Trainor donated funds to feed healthcare professionals in Greater Hartford and pledged money for restaurants in Connecticut to provide 50 lunches to local hospitals daily for five days. She also held a Live At-Home concert series to raise money for Feeding America.

=== Politics ===
In 2016, Trainor said she had never voted in a United States presidential election and did not intend to do so in the future. She said she preferred Hillary Clinton over Donald Trump in the 2016 United States presidential election. Trainor is outspoken about LGBTQ rights and gun control, and was among the 200 artists and music executives to sign Billboard's open letter to the United States Congress demanding an end to gun violence. In 2017, she publicly supported the legalization of same-sex marriage while denouncing an Australian campaign against it. A year later, through Billboard, Trainor published a "love letter" to the LGBTQ community in which she described the community as "some of [her] biggest fans since [she] came onto the scene". In 2022, she was among the 150 artists and influencers to sign their support for Planned Parenthood's #BansOffOurBodies campaign in support of Roe v. Wade.

== Achievements ==
Trainor has won four ASCAP Pop Music Awards, two Billboard Music Awards, a People's Choice Award, and a Grammy Award. Trainor was awarded Best Female Artist at the 2009 International Acoustic Music Awards and the Grand Prize at the 2010 New Orleans Songwriter's Festival; she has also won the 2011 Tennessee Concerts Song Contest and the John Lennon Love Song Songwriting Contest. She was named the "Breakthrough Artist of the Year" by the Music Business Association in 2014.

Among her achievements, she became the 21st female artist whose debut single peaked at the top of the Billboard Hot 100, and the fifth female artist to follow up her chart-topping debut single with another top-five release. On the Billboard Year-End charts for 2015, Trainor was listed seventh on Top Artists and second on Top Female Artists. Billboard ranked her at number 40 on their list of the top artists of the 2010s, and number 33 on their 2025 "Top 100 Women Artists of the 21st Century" list. Title was placed 98th on the magazine's "Greatest of All Time Billboard 200 Albums by Women" list, with "All About That Bass" ranking at number 69 on the all inclusive list for singles. As of October 2015, "All About That Bass" was the only debut single by any artist to accumulate a billion views on YouTube.

== Discography ==
- Title (2015) (Note: Though Trainor independently released three acoustic albums between 2009 and 2011, Title is her first on a record label, and is widely reported to be her debut studio album.)
- Thank You (2016)
- Treat Myself (2020)
- A Very Trainor Christmas (2020)
- Takin' It Back (2022)
- Timeless (2024)
- Toy with Me (2026)

== Tours ==
- That Bass Tour (2015)
- MTrain Tour (2015)
- The Untouchable Tour (2016)
- The Timeless Tour (2024)

== Filmography ==
Film
Year	Title	Role	Notes	Ref.
2017	Smurfs: The Lost Village	Smurfmelody	Voice role	
2019	Playmobil: The Movie	Fairy god-mother	Voice role	

Television
Year	Title	Role	Notes	Ref.
2015	The Voice	Herself	Season 8 (as advisor of Team Blake)	
2015	Undateable	Herself	Season 3	
2017	RuPaul's Drag Race	Guest Judge	Episode: "Reality Stars: The Musical"	
2018	The Four: Battle for Stardom	Judge	Seasons 1 and 2	
2018	Drop the Mic	Herself	Episode: "Danielle Fishel vs. Jonathan Lipnicki / Shania Twain vs. Meghan Trainor"	
2018	Lip Sync Battle	Guest	1 Episode	
2018	CMT Crossroads	Herself	Along with Brett Eldredge	
2019	Songland	Herself	Episode: "Meghan Trainor"	
2020	SpongeBob SquarePants	Herself	Episode: "SpongeBob's Appreciation Day!"	
2020	The Voice UK	Coach	Series 9	
2020	The Price is Right	Herself/Guest	Episode: "Music Week", Aired on January 24, 2020	
2020	#KidsTogether: The Nickelodeon Town Hall	Herself	Television special	
2020	Celebrity Watch Party	Herself	Episode: "The Celebrity Watch Party Has Begun"	
2021	Blue's Clues & You!	Rainbow	Voice role; episode: "Blue's Rainy Day Rainbow"	
2021	Top Chef Family Style	Host		
2022	Password	Herself/Guest	Episode: "Meghan Trainor; Jimmy Fallon"	
2023	Australian Idol	Judge	Series 8	
2026	Phineas and Ferb	Vending Machine Prime	Voice role; episode: "Vendpocalypse: The Musical"	
2026	Hey A.J.!	Maggie	Voice role; 4 episodes	

== See also ==
- List of artists who reached number one in the United States
