= Thank You (Meghan Trainor album) =

Studio album by Meghan Trainor
- Released: May 13, 2016
- Recorded: 2015–2016
- Studios: Ricky Reed's studio (Elysian Park, Los Angeles, California); Vietom (Sherman Oaks, Los Angeles, California); Hooked on Sonics (Memphis, Tennessee); MXM (Los Angeles, California); Windmark Recording (Santa Monica, California); Vibeland (New York City, New York); The Attic (Nashville, Tennessee); The Green Room (Nashville, Tennessee); The Carriage House (Nolensville, Tennessee); The Record Plant (Hollywood, California); Studio Willow-Valley (Gothenburg, Sweden); R8D (North Hollywood, California)
- Genres: Pop; dance-pop; R&B
- Length: 39:17
- Label: Epic
- Producers: Ricky Reed; Tommy Brown; Steven Franks; Johan Carlsson; Thomas Troelsen; The Elev3n; Chris Gelbuda; Kevin Kadish; Twice as Nice; The Monsters & Strangerz; German

Meghan Trainor chronology
Title (2015)	Thank You (2016)	The Love Train (2019)

Singles from Thank You
- 1. "No" Released: March 4, 2016; 2. "Me Too" Released: May 5, 2016; 3. "Better" Released: August 29, 2016

Thank You is the second studio album by the American singer-songwriter Meghan Trainor. Epic Records released it on May 13, 2016, after a week of exclusive streaming on Apple Music. Trainor wrote most of its material with songwriter Jacob Kasher Hindlin and the album's producer Ricky Reed. Influenced by various genres including dance, hip hop, funk, and Caribbean music, Trainor conceived the album to showcase her versatility. It features guest appearances by Yo Gotti, LunchMoney Lewis, Trainor's mother, and R. City.

Thank You is a pop, dance-pop, and R&B record which explores themes such as self-acceptance, empowerment, and Trainor's experiences with fame. She promoted the album with public appearances and televised performances. After its release, Trainor embarked on the Untouchable Tour (2016). Thank You included three singles: "No" and "Me Too", which respectively peaked at numbers three and thirteen on the US Billboard Hot 100, and "Better".

Reviewers were divided about Thank You; a few thought its production was an improvement from Trainor's debut major-label studio album, Title (2015), while others believed it lacked artistic identity and criticized the lyrical themes. In the US, the album debuted at number three on the Billboard 200 with first week sales of 107,000 album-equivalent units. It peaked within the top five in Australia, Canada, New Zealand, Scotland, and the United Kingdom and received Platinum certifications in the US and Canada.

== Background ==
Trainor signed a contract with Epic Records in 2014 and released her debut single, "All About That Bass", in June that year. The song reached number one in 58 countries and sold 11 million units worldwide. Trainor's artists and repertoire contact asked her to work on similar material with its co-writer, Kevin Kadish, for her debut major-label studio album, Title (2015). Her father had always encouraged her to "write for every genre", and she believed she had the ability to compose music in a variety of styles. Trainor created more doo-wop songs but believed they did not showcase her versatility: "I don't want to be stuck here because honestly it's not what I do. I do pop songs. I do Caribbean songs. I do everything." The album debuted at number one on the Billboard 200 and became the ninth-best-selling album of 2015. It produced three top-10 singles on the Billboard Hot 100, and she won the 2016 Grammy Award for Best New Artist. Trainor was embroiled in controversies surrounding the lyrics of "All About That Bass" and the portrayal of gender roles in the music video for her song "Dear Future Husband" (2015). Some critics questioned the sustainability of her commercial success and anticipated a decline with subsequent releases.

== Recording and production ==
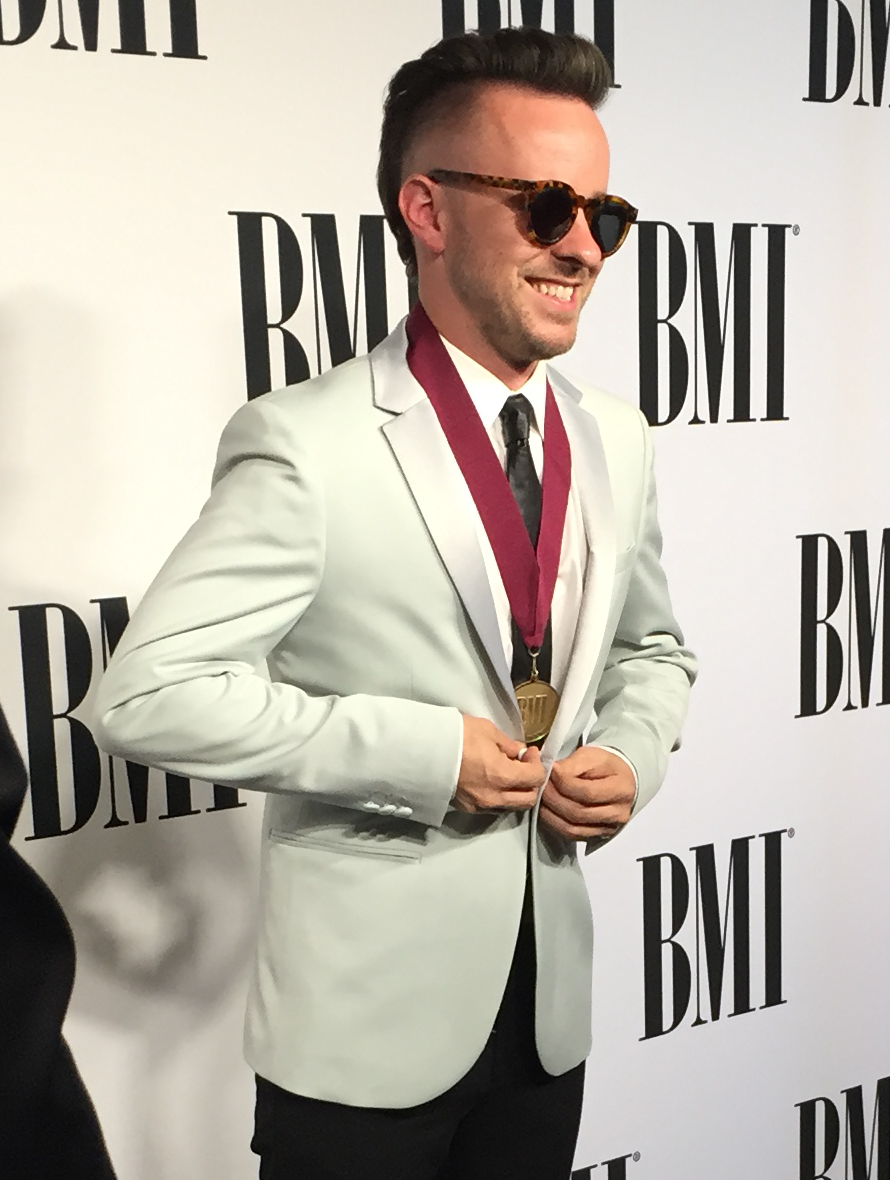
Ricky Reed (pictured in 2015) is the executive producer for Thank You.

In October 2015, Trainor began holding studio sessions for her second major-label studio album. Kadish reprised his role as producer and co-writer. A fan of the music project Wallpaper, Trainor co-wrote songs with its frontman, producer Ricky Reed, and his frequent collaborator Jacob Kasher Hindlin. In a December 2015 interview, she revealed that the album would be completed soon, with an expected release in "February or March", and she confirmed collaborations with her mother and R. City. On December 11, the day after Trainor co-wrote the song "Just a Friend to You" with Chris Gelbuda, she uploaded three clips of it to Instagram. She described the two albums' worth of material initially conceived as "these great doo-wop-y throwback songs that were huge".

Upon hearing the material, L.A. Reid, the chairman of Epic Records, encouraged her to go back to the drawing board because she lacked a proper lead single for the project, a behavior that Trainor described as typical of him. In a session that started with the idea of a dancehall-inspired rhythm, Trainor, Reed, and Hindlin wrote the song "No". When Reid heard it, he jumped up and said "that's what I'm talkin' about!", playing it 29 times in succession. Ultimately, "No" changed the direction of Thank You, as the three started experimenting with new musical styles and produced six more tracks. The doo-wop material was retained on the album's deluxe version. Along with Reed, the executive producer, its producers include Tommy Brown, Steven Franks, Johan Carlsson, Thomas Troelsen, the Elev3n, Gelbuda, Kadish, Twice as Nice, the Monsters & Strangerz, and German.

Trainor chose Thank You as the album title after writing its title track to express gratitude for her fans and others who supported her career: "I wanted this album to be dedicated to everyone who helped me get here – from my family, to my fans, to radio people, to magazines. Everyone." She was influenced by various genres—dance, hip hop, funk, and Caribbean music which she was introduced to by her Trinidadian uncle. Trainor cited Bruno Mars as an inspiration due to his ability to "pull off" a diverse amount of musical styles, along with artists she listened to during her childhood like Aretha Franklin and Elvis Presley and ones she missed hearing on the radio—NSYNC and Destiny's Child. She thought listeners would be unable to recognize Thank You as her album on first listen: "When you first listen to [the album] you might go, 'Whoa, who is this?' Then you hear my quirky lyrics and throwback melodies, and it sounds like Meghan Trainor sounds."

== Composition ==
=== Overview ===
The standard edition of Thank You includes 12 tracks; the deluxe edition contains three additional original songs, and the Target version has all 15 tracks and two more. The album predominantly comprises a pop, R&B, and dance-pop sound. Rolling Stone's Christopher R. Weingarten thought it is "a brash pop statement" that expands Trainor's sound into "dance-, rap- and Caribbean-influenced tunes". Allan Raible of ABC News described Thank You's style as "funk, faux hip-hop, and some ballads", and Stephen Thomas Erlewine of AllMusic believed its "shiny, happy pop" was equally influenced by "modern R&B and Y2K throwback". Lyrically, the album is about self-acceptance, empowerment, and Trainor's experiences with her recent fame.

=== Songs ===
"Better"
Trainor wanted Thank You to showcase her versatility, influenced by various genres including Caribbean music. "Better", a soca and reggae song, evokes the genre in its instrumentation.

The album opens with "Watch Me Do", an upbeat song which recalls hip hop music from the 1990s, referencing several songs from the genre. In its lyrics, Trainor denounces her detractors and flaunts her looks and riches; The Boston Globe's Marc Hirsh described it as "James-Brown-by-way-of-Bruno-Mars rubbery electro-hip-hop funk groove". "Me Too" is an electro and R&B song about self-love. The third track, "No", is a dance-pop and R&B song, with lyrics about sexual consent and women's empowerment. "Better", featuring Yo Gotti, is a soca and reggae song, whose instrumentation of percussion, guitar, and a "loping beat" give it a "Caribbean feel" according to PopMatters' Chris Conaton. Its lyrics are about Trainor addressing an ex-lover and acknowledging she deserves better than him. The fifth track, "Hopeless Romantic" is a stripped-down doo-wop love ballad, based on a simplistic guitar and vocal arrangement.

"I Love Me", featuring LunchMoney Lewis, is a song about confidence with a groovy baseline, which The Guardian's Dave Simpson described as a "self-help-manual-with-beats" and the Knoxville News Sentinel's Chuck Campbell called a "clappy/plucky sing-along" that seems like a mashup of "Happy" (2013) and "Uptown Funk" (2014). The seventh track, "Kindly Calm Me Down", is a piano ballad reminiscent of the work of Adele and places emphasis on Trainor's voice as she pleads her lover to mollify her. "Woman Up", a hawkish song with lyrics commanding women to lift their hands if they are good without a man, reworks the 2014 Ashley Roberts song of the same name. "Just a Friend to You" is a ukulele-driven song about unreciprocated affection towards someone. The 10th track, "I Won't Let You Down", is the lyrical opposite of "Better"; Trainor declares her partner deserves better than the way she has been treating him.

"Dance Like Yo Daddy" includes squawking saxophone sounds and audacious background vocals and is about eschewing one's wariness and dancing. The standard edition closes with "Champagne Problems", on which Trainor complains about first world problems, like bad wi-fi connections and her phone discharging. "Mom" contains a recorded phone conversation between Trainor and her mother, along with girl group background vocals and a Motown-influenced horn segment. "Friends" is a sing-along, in which Trainor celebrates having a delightful time because she is in the company of her friends. The deluxe edition closes with the title track, which features R. City. The Target version includes the songs "Goosebumps" and "Throwback Love", which also appear on the Japanese edition along with a karaoke version of "No" and the song "Good to Be Alive".

== Release and promotion ==
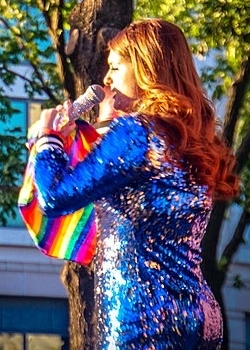
Trainor performing at Capital Pride in 2016

Trainor's public image evolved with the release of Thank You; in an interview with her, Weingarten described it as "[Trainor] emerging from a poodle-skirt shell into a modern pop star". In February 2016, she got a shorter haircut and dyed her hair auburn, allowing her to travel outside without being recognized. Trainor started identifying as a feminist, after previously refusing to consider herself one. Her objective with the album was "to model someone who is cool with herself". Thank You was streamed exclusively on Apple Music during the week preceding its release. The album was officially released to other platforms on May 13, 2016.

Thank You was promoted with the release of three singles. (Note: Additional tracks released before the album included "Watch Me Do", "I Love Me", and "Mom".) The first two, "No" and Me Too", were released on March 4 and May 5, 2016, respectively, and peaked at numbers three and thirteen on the Billboard Hot 100. Writing for the magazine, Jada Yuan described them as "bona fide hits". Some critics accused Trainor of staging a publicity stunt when she pulled the latter song's music video due to alleged unapproved digital alteration of her waist size; Trainor denied the allegations. "Better" was released as the third single from the album on August 29, 2016, and it commercially underperformed.

Trainor promoted Thank You with public appearances and televised live performances at award shows, including the iHeartRadio Music Awards and Billboard Music Awards. Her appearances on television talk shows included The Tonight Show Starring Jimmy Fallon, The Ellen DeGeneres Show, Today, and The Graham Norton Show. A performance of "Me Too" on The Tonight Show drew attention when Trainor fell to the floor while trying to grab a hold of a microphone stand. Songs from the album were featured in television shows and movies. (Note: "Mom" was featured in the 2016 film Mother's Day and "Woman Up" in Reality Stars: The Musical, a RuPaul's Drag Race episode in which Trainor served as a guest judge.) It was supported by the Untouchable Tour, which began in Vancouver, British Columbia, in July 2016, and concluded in Boston in September 2016. Hailee Steinfeld and Common Kings served as opening acts.

== Critical reception ==
Professional ratings
Aggregate scores
Source	Rating
AnyDecentMusic?	5.1/10
Metacritic	60/100
Review scores
Source	Rating
ABC News	2.5/5 stars
AllMusic	3.5/5 stars
Entertainment Weekly	B+
The Guardian	2/5 stars
Knoxville News Sentinel	3/5 stars
Newsday	B
The Observer	1/5 stars
PopMatters	6/10 stars
Slant Magazine	2/5 stars
Spin	6/10

Thank You received generally mixed reviews from critics. At Metacritic, which assigns a weighted mean rating out of 100 to reviews from mainstream critics, the album received an average score of 60, based on 10 reviews. Spin's Dan Weiss called it a huge advancement from Title, for which he credited Reed's funk-influenced production that did not incorporate synthesizers. Erlewine believed Thank You is more modern and consistent as it is rooted in refined and fashionable sensibilities, but he added that it is too self-congratulatory and exposes the "seams in [the] construction" of Trainor's music. Newsday's Glenn Gamboa wrote that Trainor is among the most talented new artists at writing songs suited to her persona, and Conaton thought the album marked musical development and took her nearer to the more unvaried sound of popular music.

Some critics thought Thank You did not showcase Trainor's artistic identity. Hirsh opined that she emulates several other artists on the album. The Observer's Michael Cragg described its songs as "identity-free filler". Campbell thought Thank You proved Trainor had not yet established her identity and portrayed a witty and determined pop star with lacking certitude. Patrick Ryan of USA Today wrote that the album attempts to be many things and falls short but portends a bright future for her. Writing for Entertainment Weekly, Isabella Biedenharn believed Trainor had a "bit of an identity crisis"; she praised her jocular songwriting on the upbeat tracks but added that its attempts at being intimate fall short. Raible believed she is a gifted performer but Thank You fails to exhibit her talent; he preferred its ballads and encouraged her to take that direction for more success.

Other reviewers commented on the lyrical themes. Slant Magazine's Alexa Camp stated that with Thank You, Trainor continued promoting a narrow and materialistic type of feminism. Camp criticized the album as kind of a parody, which insincerely supports a millennial generation brought up on flimsy self-validation. Simpson called it "a bit of a hotchpotch", and he wrote that its songs about female empowerment actually appeal to "the male gaze" when dissected. Hazel Cills of MTV News wrote that other pop and R&B female empowerment songs would outshine the precise "'you want to be me' positioning" of Thank You, and she described the album as an assortment of "trend-grabbing dresses" that would fall apart by the following year.

== Commercial performance ==
Thank You peaked within the top five in several countries where Title had reached number one. In the US, Thank You debuted at number three on the Billboard 200 dated June 4, 2016, with 107,000 album-equivalent units, including 84,000 pure sales, during its first week. The figure marked a decline from Title's opening week of 238,000 album-equivalent units. The Recording Industry Association of America certified it Platinum in 2018. Thank You debuted at number four on the Canadian Albums Chart and received a Platinum certification from Music Canada in 2017. The album peaked at number five in the UK and spent nine weeks on the chart. It was certified Silver by the British Phonographic Industry in 2020.

In Australia, Thank You reached number three and spent eight weeks in the top ten. The album earned a Gold certification from the Australian Recording Industry Association in July 2016. It debuted at number five in New Zealand and spent seven weeks on the chart. Elsewhere, Thank You charted within the top thirty, at number five in Scotland, number eight in Spain, number fifteen in Ireland, number sixteen in Switzerland, number twenty in Austria, the Netherlands, and Norway, number twenty-two in Sweden, and number twenty-five in Germany. The album received a Gold certification in Brazil, Denmark, and Poland.

== Track listing ==
Thank You – Standard edition
No.	Title	Writer(s)	Producer(s)	Length
1.	"Watch Me Do"	Meghan Trainor; Eric Frederic; Jacob Kasher Hindlin; Gamal Lewis	Ricky Reed	2:49
2.	"Me Too"	M. Trainor; Frederic; Hindlin; Jason Desrouleaux; Peter Svensson	Reed	3:01
3.	"No"	M. Trainor; Frederic; Hindlin	Reed	3:33
4.	"Better" (featuring Yo Gotti)	M. Trainor; Frederic; Tommy Brown; Steven Franks; Mario Mims; Taylor Parks; Travis Sayles	Reed; Brown; Franks	2:47
5.	"Hopeless Romantic"	M. Trainor; Johan Carlsson; Ross Golan	Carlsson; M. Trainor^{[a]}	4:05
6.	"I Love Me" (with LunchMoney Lewis)	M. Trainor; Frederic; Hindlin; Lewis; Thomas Troelsen	Reed; Troelsen	2:47
7.	"Kindly Calm Me Down"	M. Trainor; Frederic; James G. Morales; Matthew Morales; Julio David Rodriguez	Reed; The Elev3n	3:58
8.	"Woman Up"	M. Trainor; Frederic; Morales; Morales; Rodriguez; Parks; Nash Overstreet; Erika Nuri; Shane Stevens	Reed; The Elev3n	3:28
9.	"Just a Friend to You"	M. Trainor; Frederic; Chris Gelbuda	Reed; Gelbuda	2:44
10.	"I Won't Let You Down"	M. Trainor; Frederic; Hindlin; Lewis	Reed	3:20
11.	"Dance Like Yo Daddy"	M. Trainor; Frederic; Kevin Kadish	Reed; Kadish	3:03
12.	"Champagne Problems"	M. Trainor; Brown; Nick Audino; Lewis Hughes; Khaled Rohaim; Michael Foster; Ryan Matthew Tedder	Brown; Twice as Nice	3:42
Total length:				39:17

Thank You – Deluxe edition
No.	Title	Writer(s)	Producer(s)	Length
13.	"Mom" (featuring Kelli Trainor)	M. Trainor; Carlsson; Golan; Justin Trainor	Carlsson; J. Trainor^{[b]}	3:14
14.	"Friends"	M. Trainor; Frederic; Brown; Franks; Foster; Tedder; Bianca Atterberry	Reed; Brown; Franks	3:30
15.	"Thank You" (featuring R. City)	M. Trainor; Stefan Johnson; Jordan Johnson; Marcus Lomax; Theron Thomas; Timothy Thomas; Oliver Peterhof; Jordan Federman	The Monsters & Strangerz; German	3:25
Total length:				49:26

Thank You – Target edition
No.	Title	Writer(s)	Producer(s)	Length
16.	"Goosebumps"	M. Trainor; Frederic; Lewis; Eric Tobias Wincorn; Joe Spargur; Robert Riley; Charles White; Billy Ball	Reed; Wincorn^{[c]}	3:41
17.	"Throwback Love"	M. Trainor; Kadish	Reed; Kadish	3:14
Total length:				56:21

Thank You – Japanese edition
No.	Title	Writer(s)	Producer(s)	Length
18.	"No" (karaoke version)	M. Trainor; Frederic; Hindlin	Reed	3:33
19.	"Good to Be Alive"	M. Trainor; Ryan Trainor	M. Trainor; J. Trainor	3:47
Total length:				63:41

Notes

- ^{^[a]} signifies a vocal producer
- ^{^[b]} signifies a co-producer
- ^{^[c]} signifies an additional producer
- The Target edition tracks were later released on other platforms.

Sample credits

- "Woman Up" contains a sample of Ashley Roberts's song of the same name (written by James G. Morales, Matthew Morales, Julio David Rodriguez, Nash Overstreet, Erika Nuri, and Shane Stevens)
- "Goosebumps" contains a portion of the composition "African Suspense" by The Billy Ball Upsetters (written by Robert Riley, Charles White, and Billy Ball)

== Personnel ==
Recording locations and personnel are adapted from the album's liner notes.

Recording locations

- Recorded and engineered at Ricky Reed's studio (Elysian Park, Los Angeles, California), Vietom Studios (Sherman Oaks, Los Angeles, California), Hooked on Sonics (Memphis, Tennessee), MXM Studios (Los Angeles, California), Windmark Recording (Santa Monica, California), Vibeland Studios (New York City, New York), The Attic (Nashville, Tennessee), The Green Room (Nashville, Tennessee), The Carriage House (Nolensville, Tennessee), The Record Plant (Hollywood, California), Studio Willow-Valley (Gothenburg, Sweden), R8D Studios (North Hollywood, California)
- Mixed at The Carriage House (Nolensville, Tennessee)
- Mastered at Sterling Sound (New York City, New York)
- Management – Atom Factory, a division of Coalition Media Group (Los Angeles, California)
- Legal – Myman Greenspan Fineman/Fox Rosenberg & Light LLP

Personnel

- Meghan Trainor – vocals, background vocals, executive producer, programming, choir
- Ricky Reed – executive producer, programming, bass (tracks 1–2, 6–7, 9), guitar (tracks 1–2, 4, 6, 8), keyboards (tracks 1–4, 6, 8, 10–11, 14), piano (tracks 3, 6, 10)
- Tommy Brown – producer, programming, guitar (track 4), keyboards (tracks 4, 7)
- Mr. Franks – producer, programming, guitar (track 4), keyboards (tracks 4, 14)
- Johan Carlsson – producer, programming, acoustic guitar (tracks 5, 13), guitar (tracks 5, 13), background vocals, piano (track 13), synthesizer (track 13), tambourine (track 13)
- Thomas Troelsen – producer, programming, background vocals, bass (track 6), tambourine (track 6)
- The Elev3n – producer, programming
- Chris Gelbuda – producer, background vocals, guitar (track 9)
- Kevin Kadish – producer, programming, baritone saxophone (track 11), electric guitar (track 11), piano (track 11), tambourine (track 11)
- Twice as Nice – producer, programming
- The Monsters and the Strangerz – producer, programming
- Tom Peyton – drums (tracks 1–2)
- Chris Gehringer – mastering
- Manny Marroquin – mixing (tracks 1–4, 6–12, 14)
- John Hanes – mixing (tracks 5, 13)
- Serban Ghenea – mixing (tracks 5, 13, 15)
- Yo Gotti – vocals (track 4)
- LunchMoney Lewis – vocals (track 6)
- Kelli Trainor – vocals (track 13), choir
- R. City – vocals (track 15)
- James G. Morales – background vocals, drums (track 7–8), keyboards (track 8)
- Matthew Morales – background vocals, strings (track 7), horn (track 8)
- Julio David Rodriguez – background vocals, bass (tracks 7–8), guitar (track 7–8)
- Jelli Dorman – background vocals
- Taylor Parks – background vocals
- Jennifer Hartswick – background vocals
- Ross Golan – background vocals
- Anita Marisa Boriboon – art director, design
- Maya Krispin – styling
- Lorien Meillon – hair
- Alison Christian – make-up
- Tom Schrimacher – photography

== Charts ==
=== Weekly charts ===
Weekly chart positions for Thank You
Chart (2016)	Peak position
Australian Albums (ARIA)	3
Austrian Albums (Ö3 Austria)	20
Belgian Albums (Ultratop Flanders)	37
Belgian Albums (Ultratop Wallonia)	65
Canadian Albums (Billboard)	4
Danish Albums (Hitlisten)	32
Dutch Albums (Album Top 100)	20
Finnish Albums (Suomen virallinen lista)	32
French Albums (SNEP)	96
German Albums (Offizielle Top 100)	25
Irish Albums (IRMA)	15
Italian Albums (FIMI)	80
Japan (Oricon)	39
New Zealand Albums (RMNZ)	5
Norwegian Albums (VG-lista)	20
Scottish Albums (Official Charts)	5
South Korean Albums (Gaon)	54
South Korean Albums International (Gaon)	7
Spanish Albums (Promusicae)	8
Swedish Albums (Sverigetopplistan)	22
Swiss Albums (Schweizer Hitparade)	16
UK Albums (Official Charts)	5
US Billboard 200	3

=== Year-end charts ===
Year-end chart positions for Thank You
Chart (2016)	Position
Australian Albums (ARIA)	30
Canadian Albums (Billboard)	36
US Billboard 200	45

== Certifications ==
Certifications for Thank You
Region	Certification	Certified units/sales
Australia (ARIA)	Gold	35,000^{^}
Brazil (Pro-Música Brasil)	Gold	20,000^{‡}
Canada (Music Canada)	Platinum	80,000^{‡}
Denmark (IFPI Danmark)	Gold	10,000^{‡}
New Zealand (RMNZ)	Platinum	15,000^{‡}
Poland (ZPAV)	Gold	10,000^{‡}
United Kingdom (BPI)	Silver	60,000^{‡}
United States (RIAA)	Platinum	1,000,000^{‡}
^{^} Shipments figures based on certification alone.^{‡} Sales+streaming figures based on certification alone.

== Release history ==
Release dates and format(s) for Thank You
Region	Date	Format	Label(s)	Ref.
Various	May 6, 2016	Streaming (Note: Exclusive to Apple Music)	Epic	
Various	May 13, 2016	CD; digital download; LP	Epic	
