= No (Meghan Trainor song) =

2016 single by Meghan Trainor

Single by Meghan Trainor

from the album Thank You
- Released: March 4, 2016
- Recorded: 2015
- Studio: Ricky Reed's Studio (Elysian Park, Los Angeles)
- Genre: Dance-pop; R&B
- Length: 3:33
- Label: Epic
- Songwriters: Meghan Trainor; Eric Frederic; Jacob Kasher Hindlin
- Producer: Ricky Reed

Meghan Trainor singles chronology
| "Boys Like You" (2015) | "No" (2016) | "Me Too" (2016) |

Music video
- "No" on YouTube

"No" (stylized in all caps) is a song by the American singer-songwriter Meghan Trainor from her second major-label studio album, Thank You (2016). Ricky Reed produced the song and wrote it with Trainor and Jacob Kasher Hindlin; Epic Records released it as the album's lead single on March 4, 2016. A dance-pop song inspired by 1990s pop music and R&B, "No" has lyrics about sexual consent and empowerment, encouraging women to reject unwanted advances from men.

Music critics praised "No" as a showcase of Trainor's confident and mature side and deemed it an improvement from her earlier songs. In the United States, the song reached number three on the Billboard Hot 100 and was certified 2× Platinum by the Recording Industry Association of America. It also reached the top 10 in Australia, Canada, Austria, Latvia, South Africa, and Scotland, attaining multi-platinum certifications in the former two and Poland.

Fatima Robinson directed the music video for "No", which features Trainor performing choreographed dances in a warehouse and entwining her arms with accompanying female dancers. Critics compared it to the visuals of various 1990s female recording artists and praised her creative evolution, particularly the choreography. In further promotion, Trainor performed "No" on television shows such as the iHeartRadio Music Awards, The Ellen DeGeneres Show, and the Billboard Music Awards, and included it on the set list of her 2016 concert tour, the Untouchable Tour (named after a lyric from the song's bridge), and the Timeless Tour (2024).

== Background and release ==
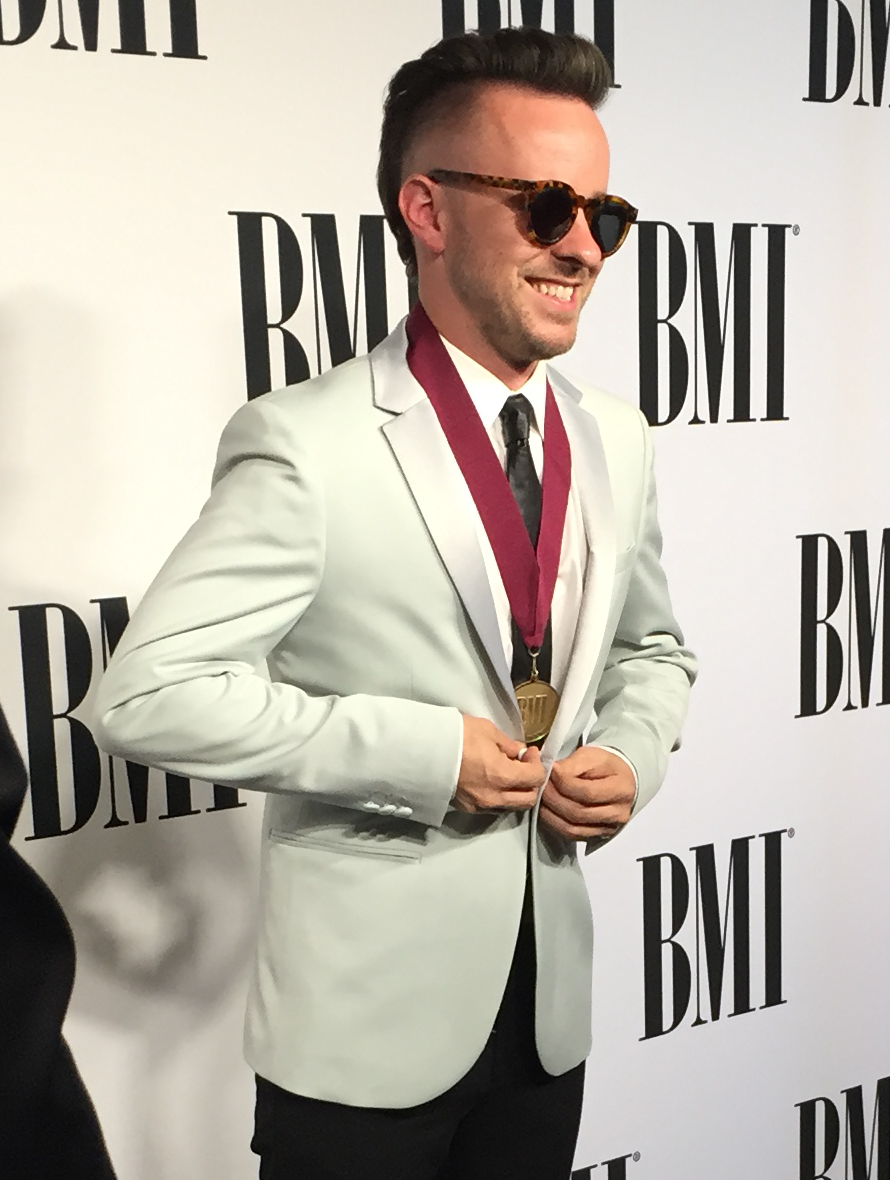
Ricky Reed produced and co-wrote "No".

Trainor signed with Epic Records in 2014 and released her doo-wop debut single, "All About That Bass", to commercial success. She initially recorded music in a similar vein for her second major-label studio album, Thank You (2016). L.A. Reid, the chairman of the label, encouraged Trainor to go back to the drawing board because she lacked a proper lead single for the project: "You don't have your bullet. You don't have that big song," a behavior that Trainor described as typical of him. Determined not to write "All About That Bass 2.0", she booked studio time with producer Ricky Reed that afternoon. Reed recounted that they "never set out to specifically go after any particular sound", beginning the session with the idea of a dancehall-inspired rhythm. They texted Jacob Kasher Hindlin to cancel his other session and join them.

Reed considered it impossible to complete the lead single that day and said, "Let's just blow off some steam, fuck around, have a good time." Trainor was determined to write "a big eff-you song, an anthem about girl power that sounded like nothing on the album", and asked Hindlin and Reed to "do a beat that no one expects Meghan Trainor to do". "No" was written within seven hours. Reed described the swift evolution of the song as "a thing of mystery", likening it to opening Pandora's box. When Reid heard it, he jumped up and said "That's what I'm talkin' about!", playing it 29 times in succession. Ultimately, "No" changed the direction of Thank You, as the three started experimenting with new musical styles and produced six more tracks.

In December 2015, Trainor stated that she had almost completed her upcoming album, describing the material as "something that's not on the radio" and disparate. In a Fuse interview published in February 2016, Trainor confirmed the lead single's title as "No" along with a March 2016 release date, calling it an anthem for women about telling a man they are fine by themselves: "No no no. I don't need your hands all over me. I'm good. I'm gonna dance on my own with my girls." On March 1 she unveiled the artwork for the song on her social media accounts. Epic Records digitally released it three days later, along with the preorder for the album. In the United States, the label promoted "No" to adult contemporary radio stations on March 7, and to contemporary hit radio stations the next day. BBC Radio 1 selected the song as the "Track of the Day" on March, while Epic Records solicited it to radio airplay in Italy four days later.

== Composition and lyrics ==
"No" (2016)
A 21-second sample of "No", a dance-pop song with guitar instrumentation on which Trainor decisively repeats the word "no"

"No" is three minutes and 33 seconds long. Reed played keyboards, piano, and produced and programmed the song. Ethan Shumaker engineered it at Reed's studio in Elysian Park, Los Angeles, Chris Gehringer mastered it at Sterling Sound in New York, and Manny Marroquin mixed it at the Carriage House studio in Nolensville, Tennessee.

"No" is inspired by 1990s music and R&B. Billboard's Joe Lynch described the song as a "dance-y pop anthem". Trainor opens it by singing doo-wop vocals over retro style music, reminiscent of her debut major-label studio album Title (2015), which transitions into crisp guitar instrumentation and a beat that recalls The Neptunes. Trainor intended for the transition to surprise listeners who may be expecting "No" to sound like her usual music: "Yeah, you think this is Meghan Trainor? Here we go, drop the beat." Fuse's Emilee Lindner compared Trainor's flow on the song to Mýa's 2003 single "My Love Is Like ... Wo", noting that the chord progression in the chorus is akin to the work of Max Martin. Spin's Brennan Carley and Time's Nolan Feeney compared its melody and guitar squeals to those of turn-of-the-millennium pop songs by Britney Spears and NSYNC. The instrumentation of "No" also makes use of whistles, described by Isabella Biedenharn of Entertainment Weekly as "a catchy sundae of whistles and sassy quips". Knoxville News Sentinel's Chuck Campbell called the song a "clubby/girl-group rumbler".

"No" has lyrics about sexual consent and women's empowerment. The song discusses men who approach women and are unable to accept it when their advances are rejected. During its chorus, Trainor repeats the word "no" several times to emphasize the eternal nature and decisiveness of the word: "My name is no, my sign is no, my number is no." She proceeds to decline an assertive male counterpart's offer to dance with her and asks him to back off. Trainor affirms that she could court a man if she intended to, but it is not her priority. When asked about her inspiration for "No", she stated that she wanted to be better at being single, and wanted the song to help young women and teenagers realize they do not need a suitor, and that they "can go out with [their] girls and have just as much fun".

== Critical reception ==
Music critics viewed "No" as a departure from Trainor's earlier work, showcasing her confident and mature side. Lindner called the song an improvement from the problematic lyrics on "All About That Bass" and Trainor's 2015 single "Dear Future Husband". Lynch stated that Trainor was more confident on it than her debut single, and proved that she has more to offer than what listeners expect. Carley thought Trainor gave up her "sock-hopping persona" in favor of straightforward free-spokenness on "No". MTV News's Lucy Bacon praised the empowering lyrics and catchy chorus, foreseeing greater success than "All About That Bass" for the song. Chris Conaton of PopMatters wrote that though it strays from the "doo wop and early girl group-inspired songs" that popularized her, it fits her area of expertise. Writing for Spin, Dan Weiss stated that with its TLC-influenced chorus, "No" alleviates the soft-hued trauma from "All About That Bass", calling the end result faultless and magnificent. The Los Angeles Times's Gerrick D. Kennedy thought that the song was way more suitable for clubs than others by Trainor. Glenn Gamboa of Newsday described it as Trainor's version of "the usual club tale", on which she was inspired by Destiny's Child to create an empowering song so memorable it would be difficult to escape.

Writing for ABC News, Allan Raible stated that though "No" is well-intentioned, it comes across as neoteric and is a diluted version of the Destiny's Child and En Vogue songs that precede it by several years. In a negative review, Slant Magazine's Alexa Camp likened the song to a suffragette's anthem and said it pretends that dismissing an uninvited admirer is the unsurpassed assertion of a woman's agency. Carvell Wallace of MTV News accused Trainor of appropriating the African-American accent, which she clarified was inspired by her father.

Billboard named "No" the 100th best song of 2016, writing that Trainor decimates the entitled male ego on it. The magazine noted that the song encapsulates the drivel a woman has to put up with before finding a husband. On the other hand, Time named it the eighth-worst song of 2016, noting that it appeared to be a corrective measure for criticism she had received for "espousing anti-feminist messages" in the past, but was insubstantial, unimaginative and repetitive.

== Commercial performance ==
Trainor's highest debut, "No" entered at number 11 on the US Billboard Hot 100 issued for March 26, 2016. The song debuted at number 21 on the Radio Songs chart, the highest entry since Lady Gaga's "Born This Way" (2011). On April 9, 2016, it moved from number 12 to number six on the Billboard Hot 100 and became Trainor's fourth top 10 entry. "No" peaked at number three in its fourth week on the chart. The Recording Industry Association of America certified the song 2× Platinum, which denotes two million units based on sales and track-equivalent on-demand streams. On the Canadian Hot 100, it reached number 10 and was certified 3× Platinum by Music Canada.

"No" debuted at number 59 on the UK Singles Chart issued for March 11. Following Trainor's performance of the song on The Graham Norton Show, it rose from number 23 to its peak of number 11 on April 15. The British Phonographic Industry certified it Platinum. In Australia, "No" reached number nine and was certified 4× Platinum in 2023. The song peaked at number 18 in New Zealand and was certified platinum. It charted within the top 20 of national record charts, at number two in South Africa, number three in Israel, number seven in Austria, number eight in Scotland, number 12 in the Czech Republic, Germany, Hungary, number 13 in Argentina, number 15 in Spain, and number 20 in Ireland. "No" received a 3× Platinum certification in Mexico, 2× Platinum in Poland, Platinum in Spain, Sweden, and Gold in Belgium, Denmark, Germany, and Italy.

== Music video ==
=== Background ===
Fatima Robinson directed the music video for "No", which was filmed on the same day for the single. It premiered on Trainor's YouTube and Vevo accounts on March 21. To represent the new musical direction she took with the song, she wanted its video to be darker and more sexually charged than her previous works. Trainor aimed for it to be converse of her bright and colorful music video for "All About That Bass". She told Billboard during rehearsals that she danced "more than [she had] ever danced in [her] life" in the video. Trainor's stylist, Maya Krispin, picked outfits that Trainor could comfortably dance in, including a light metallic gold coat designed by Isabel Marant, a black sequined blazer by Veronica Beard, and a customized crimson outfit by Michael Costello. Krispin designed the rest of Trainor's ensemble: a black jumpsuit with a bra top and a fishnet bodysuit.

=== Synopsis ===
Critics observed the video's sexual nature as a noticeable departure from Trainor's previous work. It received comparisons to the work of Britney Spears among other artists.

In the music video, Trainor walks in an abandoned warehouse filled with smoke and old machines. Dressed in a metallic silver jacket, she performs a choreographed dance routine with female backup dancers. Black and red shots of a female silhouette are interspersed with the routine, which MTV News's Sasha Geffen deemed reminiscent of 1990s iPod commercials. In another scene, Trainor, in a fishnet bodysuit, entwines her arms with the dancers, and brushes her cleavage; Evan Real of Us Weekly compared it to Spears' music video for "I'm a Slave 4 U" (2001). Trainor proceeds to sway her hair in front of a high-powered fan. It concludes with all previous scenes meshed with shots of women holding open flares.

=== Reception ===
Critics compared the music video to artists including Spears, Destiny's Child, and Janet Jackson. John Paul Stapleton of The Boston Globe opined that it shows Trainor's seductive side, reminiscent of Jackson in her heyday. Geffen thought the video features substantial 1990s pop overtones redolent of TLC. Lynch compared its atmosphere to 2000s Spears and 1990s Madonna videos, and Trainor's outfits to those the latter wore while promoting her album Erotica (1992). Lorena Blas of USA Today likened the choreography to the work of Missy Elliott, and Destiny's Child's music video for "Jumpin', Jumpin'" (2000).

Some reviewers directed praise towards the video for representing a change from Trainor's earlier work. Lynch thought it marked a shocking transition from the light colors and old-world adorable tone featured in Trainor's early videos, describing it as a sultrier look for her. Real thought the video recalled "killer choreography and coordinat[ed] outfits" popular in the early 2000s, which was new territory for Trainor. Joey Nolfi of Entertainment Weekly noted that unlike her video for "Like I'm Gonna Lose You" (2015), Trainor attempted legitimate pop star dancing in it. Billboard's Katie Atkinson described Trainor's look as stern and seductive, and found the video "very Y2K-leaning". Nick Maslow of People called the dance moves keen and Trainor's hair in it worthy of becoming a popular GIF.

Writing for The Kansas City Star, Jeneé Osterheldt preferred the song to its music video but said Trainor's choice to be sexual in the latter strengthened the song's message: "Too often men think a woman's clothes or demeanor mean that [...] they are entitled to her body." In a less enthusiastic review, Spin's Rachel Brodsky found the visuals endearing but thought Nicki Minaj played the underground seductress better in her music video for "Only" (2014). Dennis Hinzmann of Out was critical of Trainor's dancing, noting the background dancers upstaged Trainor and made her look evasive.

== Live performances and other usage ==
Trainor performed "No" live at the 3rd iHeartRadio Music Awards on April 3, 2016; Lynch ranked it as the seventh best performance of the night, complimenting her vocal delivery but noting she looked uncomfortable executing the dance sequence. On April 8, she reprised the song on The Graham Norton Show. Trainor sang it on The Voice UK's fifth season finale on April 10, and The Ellen DeGeneres Show ten days later; she accompanied both performances with one-armed choreography. On May 22, 2016, she performed "No" at the 2016 Billboard Music Awards, in a multihued and spangly dress while strolling through the crowd; Rolling Stone was critical of the performance, deeming it one of the night's worst, it stated that Trainor failed to "sell her hit onstage" and was upstaged by the celebrities in the audience and their glowing wristbands. Trainor reprised the song for Today's Citi Concert series on June 21, 2016. She included it as the last song on her setlists for The Untouchable Tour (2016), during the encore, and the Timeless Tour (2024).

A cappella group Pentatonix released a cover version of "No" via their YouTube channel in April, which Trainor praised on Twitter. On April 7, Allison Iraheta and other contestants covered the song during the season 15 finale of American Idol. It is featured in an episode of the second season of American television series Superstore.

== Credits and personnel ==
Credits are adapted from the liner notes of Thank You.

=== Recording locations ===
The song was recorded and engineered at Ricky Reed's Studio in Elysian Park, Los Angeles. Audio mixing was done at The Carriage House in Nolensville, Tennessee, and mastering at Sterling Sound in New York City.

=== Personnel ===
- Ricky Reed – producer, songwriter, keyboards, piano, programming
- Meghan Trainor – songwriter
- Jacob Kasher Hindlin – songwriter
- Ethan Shumaker – engineer
- Chris Gehringer – mastering
- Manny Marroquin – mixing

== Charts ==
=== Weekly charts ===
Weekly chart positions for "No"
| Chart (2016) | Peak position |
|---|---|
| Argentina (Monitor Latino) | 13 |
| Australia (ARIA) | 9 |
| Austria (Ö3 Austria Top 40) | 7 |
| Belgium (Ultratop 50 Flanders) | 21 |
| Belgium (Ultratop 50 Wallonia) | 32 |
| Canada Hot 100 (Billboard) | 10 |
| Canada AC (Billboard) | 25 |
| Canada CHR/Top 40 (Billboard) | 16 |
| Canada Hot AC (Billboard) | 6 |
| CIS Airplay (TopHit) | 66 |
| Czech Republic Airplay (ČNS IFPI) | 12 |
| Czech Republic Singles Digital (ČNS IFPI) | 13 |
| Finland Download (Latauslista) | 23 |
| Finnish Airplay (Radiosoittolista) | 34 |
| France (SNEP) | 85 |
| Germany (GfK) | 12 |
| Hungary (Rádiós Top 40) | 26 |
| Hungary (Single Top 40) | 12 |
| Hungary (Stream Top 40) | 14 |
| Ireland (IRMA) | 20 |
| Israel (Media Forest) | 3 |
| Italy (FIMI) | 38 |
| Japan Hot 100 (Billboard) | 34 |
| Mexico (Billboard Ingles Airplay) | 1 |
| Netherlands (Dutch Top 40) | 33 |
| Netherlands (Single Top 100) | 34 |
| New Zealand (Recorded Music NZ) | 18 |
| Poland Airplay (ZPAV) | 77 |
| Russia Airplay (TopHit) | 77 |
| Scottish Singles Sales (Official Charts) | 8 |
| South Africa (EMA) | 2 |
| Spain (Promusicae) | 15 |
| Sweden (Sverigetopplistan) | 34 |
| Switzerland (Schweizer Hitparade) | 28 |
| UK Singles (Official Charts) | 11 |
| US Billboard Hot 100 | 3 |
| US Adult Contemporary (Billboard) | 16 |
| US Adult Pop Airplay (Billboard) | 6 |
| US Dance Club Songs (Billboard) | 40 |
| US Dance Airplay (Billboard) | 14 |
| US Pop Airplay (Billboard) | 7 |
| US Rhythmic Airplay (Billboard) | 20 |

=== Year-end charts ===
Year-end chart positions for "No"
| Chart (2016) | Position |
|---|---|
| Australia (ARIA) | 63 |
| Brazil (Brasil Hot 100) | 31 |
| Canada (Canadian Hot 100) | 42 |
| Germany (Official German Charts) | 92 |
| Spain (PROMUSICAE) | 78 |
| UK Singles (Official Charts Company) | 89 |
| US Billboard Hot 100 | 45 |
| US Adult Top 40 (Billboard) | 34 |
| US Mainstream Top 40 (Billboard) | 47 |

== Certifications ==
Certifications for "No"
| Region | Certification | Certified units/sales |
|---|---|---|
| Australia (ARIA) | 4× Platinum | 280,000^{‡} |
| Belgium (BRMA) | Gold | 10,000^{‡} |
| Brazil (Pro-Música Brasil) | Diamond | 250,000^{‡} |
| Canada (Music Canada) | 3× Platinum | 240,000^{‡} |
| Denmark (IFPI Danmark) | Gold | 45,000^{‡} |
| France (SNEP) | Gold | 100,000^{‡} |
| Germany (BVMI) | Gold | 200,000^{‡} |
| Italy (FIMI) | Gold | 25,000^{‡} |
| Mexico (AMPROFON) | 3× Platinum | 180,000^{‡} |
| New Zealand (RMNZ) | 2× Platinum | 60,000^{‡} |
| Poland (ZPAV) | 2× Platinum | 40,000^{‡} |
| Spain (Promusicae) | Platinum | 40,000^{‡} |
| Sweden (GLF) | Platinum | 40,000^{‡} |
| United Kingdom (BPI) | Platinum | 600,000^{‡} |
| United States (RIAA) | 2× Platinum | 2,000,000^{‡} |
^{‡} Sales+streaming figures based on certification alone.

== Release history ==
Release dates and format(s) for "No"
| Country | Date | Format | Label | Ref. |
|---|---|---|---|---|
| United Kingdom | March 4, 2016 | Digital download | Epic | |
| United States | March 4, 2016 | Digital download | Epic | |
| United States | March 7, 2016 | Adult contemporary | Epic | |
| United States | March 8, 2016 | Contemporary hit radio | Epic | |
| Italy | March 11, 2016 | Radio airplay | Epic | |
