= Amelia Tour =

2023 concert tour by Mimi Webb

- Tour by Mimi Webb
- Location: North America; Europe
- Associated album: Amelia
- Start date: March 14, 2023
- End date: October 15, 2023
- Legs: 1
- No. of shows: 52 in total
- Producer: Live Nation

Mimi Webb concert chronology
- Amelia Tour (2023); The Confessions Tour (2025)

The Amelia Tour was the debut headlining concert tour by British singer-songwriter Mimi Webb, launched in support of her first studio album, Amelia. The tour marked Webb’s first full-scale international outing as a headlining artist and spanned Europe and North America across 52 shows.

Announced on 20 October 2022 via Instagram, the tour commenced on 14 March 2023 at Plaza Club in Zurich and concluded on 15 October 2023 at Zilker Park in Austin as part of the Austin City Limits Music Festival.

== Background ==
Following the commercial breakthrough of her early extended plays and charting singles, Webb released Amelia in 2023 as her debut studio album. The record showcased a maturation in songwriting and production, blending contemporary pop with elements of synth-pop and emotional balladry. In support of the album, Webb announced her first major headlining tour, signaling a transition from supporting-act appearances to a fully realized global production centered around her own catalog.

The tour announcement was accompanied by a promotional campaign across social media platforms, with initial dates covering major European cities before expanding to North America due to demand. Additional dates were later added in select markets as ticket sales proved strong, particularly in the United Kingdom and key U.S. metropolitan areas.

== Development and production ==
The Amelia Tour was designed to reflect the thematic arc of Amelia, which explored personal growth, heartbreak, and empowerment. The stage design incorporated minimalist yet atmospheric lighting, LED backdrops, and elevated platforms to create dynamic visual transitions between upbeat pop numbers and stripped-back ballads.

Webb’s performance style emphasized live vocals, with arrangements often extended to include instrumental breakdowns and audience interaction segments. The production balanced intimate moments—such as acoustic renditions with high-energy choreography during radio singles.

The European leg consisted primarily of club and mid-sized theater venues, while the North American dates included a mix of theaters, music halls, and festival appearances. The closing performance at Zilker Park placed Webb on one of the largest stages of the tour, performing to a festival audience significantly larger than those at the tour’s opening venues.

== Tour synopsis ==
The setlist typically opened with an energetic track from Amelia, immediately establishing the album’s sonic identity. The middle section of the show often transitioned into emotionally driven ballads, accompanied by reduced instrumentation to highlight vocal delivery. Encores frequently featured some of Webb’s most recognizable singles, creating a climactic conclusion.

While the core structure of the setlist remained consistent, select performances included minor variations, such as acoustic interludes or cover songs tailored to regional audiences. Critics noted the coherence of the show’s narrative flow, aligning the concert’s progression with the emotional trajectory of the album.

== Commercial performance ==
Across its 52 shows, the Amelia Tour solidified Webb’s status as a viable international headliner. Several dates reportedly sold out, particularly in the United Kingdom and select U.S. cities. The expansion into North America represented a strategic milestone, introducing Webb to broader live audiences beyond Europe.

The tour’s final appearance at Austin City Limits served both as a celebratory conclusion and as a high-profile showcase within the North American festival circuit.

== Setlist ==
1. "Ghost of You"
2. "Remind You"
3. "See You Soon"
4. "24/5"
5. "Is It Possible"
6. "Both of Us"
7. "Good Without"
8. "The Other Side"
9. "Freezing"
10. "Dumb Love"
11. "Amelia"
12. "Roles Reversed"
13. "Before I Go"
14. "Last Train to London"
15. "Red Flags"
16. "House on Fire"
Festival setlist
1. "Freezing"
2. "Ghost of You"
3. "Halfway"
4. "See You Soon"
5. "24/5"
6. "Remind You"
7. "Is It Possible"
8. "Dumb Love"
9. "Before I Go"
10. "Red Flags"
11. "Good Without"
12. "House on Fire"

== Tour dates ==
List of 2023 concerts
Date (2023)	City	Country	Venue
March 14	Zurich	Switzerland	Plaza Club
March 15	Munich	Germany	STRØM
March 16	Vienna	Austria	Flex
March 18	Warsaw	Poland	Niebo
March 19	Berlin	Germany	Hole 44
March 20	Hamburg	Germany	Mojo Club
March 22	Stockholm	Sweden	Fryshuset
March 23	Oslo	Norway	Vulkan Arena
March 24	Copenhagen	Denmark	Pumpehuset
March 26	Amsterdam	Netherlands	Melkweg
March 27	Brussels	Belgium	La Madeleine
March 29	Cologne	Germany	Club Volta
March 30	Paris	France	La Maroquinerie
April 1	Norwich	England	UEA
April 3	Newcastle upon Tyne	England	O2 City Hall Newcastle
April 4	Glasgow	Scotland	O2 Academy Glasgow
April 6	Belfast	Northern Ireland	Ulster Hall
April 7	Dublin	Ireland	3Olympia Theatre
April 8	Dublin	Ireland	3Olympia Theatre
April 10	Liverpool	England	Mountford Hall
April 11	Manchester	England	O2 Victoria Warehouse
April 14	Sheffield	England	O2 Academy Sheffield
April 15	Leeds	England	O2 Academy Leeds
April 17	Nottingham	England	Rock City
April 18	Birmingham	England	O2 Academy Birmingham
April 20	Bristol	England	O2 Academy Bristol
April 21	Plymouth	England	Plymouth Pavilions
April 22	Bournemouth	England	O2 Academy Bournemouth
April 24	London	England	Hammersmith Apollo
May 27 (Note: Part of the BBC Radio 1's Big Weekend)	Dundee	Scotland	Camperdown Country Park
June 9 (Note: Part of the Neon Festival)	Trondheim	Norway	Dahls Arena
June 10 (Note: Part of the Parklife)	Manchester	England	Heaton Park
June 11 (Note: Part of the Summertime Ball)	London	England	Wembley Stadium
June 16 (Note: Part of the Live at the Marquee)	Cork	Ireland	Cork Docklands
June 21	Stockholm	Sweden	Gröna Lund
June 22 (Note: Part of the Tinderbox)	Odense	Denmark	Tusindårsskoven
July 1 (Note: Part of the Rock Werchter)	Werchter	Belgium	Festivalpark
July 6 (Note: Part of the Mad Cool)	Madrid	Spain	Villaverde
July 8 (Note: Part of the TRNSMT)	Glasgow	Scotland	Glasgow Green
July 16 (Note: Part of the Festival Internacional de Benicàssim)	Benicassim	Spain	Recinto de Festivales
July 18 (Note: Part of the Isle of MTV)	Floriana	Malta	The Granaries
July 22 (Note: Part of the Lollapalooza)	Paris	France	Longchamp Racecourse
July 23 (Note: Part of the Latitude Festival)	Henham	England	Henham Park
August 12 (Note: Part of the Sziget Festival)	Budapest	Hungary	Hajógyári Island
August 19 (Note: Part of the Lowlands)	Biddinghuizen	Netherlands	Evenemententerrein
August 25 (Note: Part of the Reading and Leeds Festivals)	Reading	England	Little John's Farm
August 26	Bramham	England	Bramham Park
September 2 (Note: Part of the Electric Picnic)	Stradbally	Ireland	Stradbally Hall
September 9 (Note: Part of the Lollapalooza)	Berlin	Germany	Olympiapark
September 15 (Note: Part of the SWR3 New Pop Festival)	Baden-Baden	Germany	Festspielhaus
October 8 (Note: Part of the Austin City Limits)	Austin	United States	Zilker Park
October 15	Austin	United States	Zilker Park
