= The Confessions Tour (Mimi Webb) =

2025 concert tour by Mimi Webb

- Tour by Mimi Webb
- Location: Europe
- Associated album: Confessions
- Start date: September 29, 2025
- End date: October 16, 2025
- No. of shows: 12 in total
- Producer: Live Nation

Mimi Webb concert chronology
- Amelia Tour (2023); The Confessions Tour (2025)

The Confessions Tour was the second concert tour by English singer-songwriter Mimi Webb, staged in support of her second studio album, Confessions. The tour visited cities across Europe and consisted of 12 shows. It began on 29 September 2023 at the Melkweg in Amsterdam, Netherlands, and concluded on 16 October 2023 at the Manchester Academy in Manchester, England.

The tour was officially announced on 12 June 2025 via Webb’s Instagram account, accompanied by promotional artwork and ticketing details. Despite the later announcement date, the performances themselves took place in late 2023 as part of the album’s initial promotional cycle.

== Background ==
Following the release of her second studio album, Confessions, in 2023, Mimi Webb embarked on her second headlining concert tour, titled The Confessions Tour. The album marked a creative progression from her debut, featuring a more introspective lyrical direction and a matured pop production style.

The tour was staged exclusively in Europe, focusing on intimate mid-sized venues that allowed Webb to maintain close engagement with her audience. It served as a continuation of the momentum established during her debut tour, expanding her live production scale while preserving a personal atmosphere consistent with the themes of Confessions.

On 12 June 2025, Webb announced the tour retrospectively on Instagram, sharing highlights from the performances and confirming the total number of dates and cities visited.

== Development and production ==
The Confessions Tour indicating a completed tour run, the production featured a minimalist stage design aligned with the confessional theme of the album. Visual elements included soft lighting palettes, diary-inspired backdrops, and projected imagery reinforcing the album’s themes of vulnerability, self-reflection, and emotional growth.

The setlist combined new material from Confessions with selected tracks from Webb’s earlier releases. Musical arrangements were adapted for live performance, incorporating a live band setup with enhanced vocal emphasis.

== Critical reception ==
The Confessions Tour received positive responses from fans and local critics, who highlighted Webb’s vocal performance and emotional stage presence. Reviews noted the cohesion between the album’s introspective tone and the tour’s stripped-back production. The European leg demonstrated Webb’s growing presence in the live pop market, with several shows reportedly reaching high ticket demand.

== Setlist ==
1. "Kiss My Neck"
2. "Love Language"
3. "Ghost of You"
4. "Narcissist"
5. "Side Effects"
6. "Mistake"
7. "Confessions"
8. "I Love You For Me"
9. "Rom Com"
10. "Crashing Out"
11. "You Don’t Look At Me the Same"
12. "Good Without"
13. "My Go"
14. "Freezing"
15. "Red Flags"
16. "House on Fire"
17. "Mind Reader"

== Tour dates ==
List of 2025 concerts
Date (2025)	City	Country	Venue
September 29	Amsterdam	Netherlands	Melkweg
October 1	Berlin	Germany	Hole 44
October 3	Zurich	Switzerland	Plaza Club
October 5	Brussels	Belgium	Le Madeleine
October 6	Cologne	Germany	Kantine
October 7	Paris	France	Le Trabendo
October 9	Nottingham	England	Rock City
October 10	Dublin	Ireland	3Olympia Theatre
October 12	Glasgow	Scotland	O2 Academy Glasgow
October 14	London	England	O2 Forum Kentish Town
October 15	Bristol	England	Bristol Beacon
October 16	Manchester	England	Manchester Academy
