= Meghan Trainor discography =

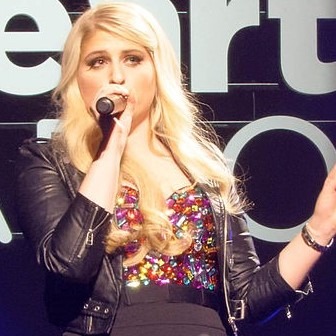
- Trainor performing on the Jingle Ball Tour at the Wells Fargo Center in December 2014
- Studio albums: 7
- EPs: 2
- Live albums: 2
- Singles: 43
- Promotional singles: 26
- Music videos: 34
- Independent albums: 3

American singer-songwriter Meghan Trainor has released seven studio albums, two extended plays (EP), two live albums, 43 singles (including eight as a featured artist), 34 music videos, three independent albums, and 26 promotional singles. She self-released the albums Meghan Trainor (2009), I'll Sing with You (2011), and Only 17 (2011); they were pulled from circulation after she signed with Epic Records in February 2014. Trainor's debut single, "All About That Bass", was released on June 30, 2014, and topped the Billboard Hot 100 for eight consecutive weeks. The single became the longest-reigning number-one by an Epic recording artist in the United States, surpassing the seven-week record held by Michael Jackson's songs "Billie Jean" (1983) and "Black or White" (1991). It topped the national charts of 58 countries and became one of the best-selling singles of all-time. As of 2015, it had sold over 11 million units internationally. "All About That Bass" was certified diamond by the Recording Industry Association of America (RIAA), and preceded Trainor's debut EP, Title (2014), which peaked at number 15 on the Billboard 200.

On October 21, 2014, she released her second single "Lips Are Movin" which attained a peak of number four on the US Billboard Hot 100. It was further certified quadruple platinum by the RIAA. The song preceded Trainor's debut major-label studio album Title (2015), which replaced her EP of the same name on the iTunes Store. Upon release, the album debuted atop the Billboard 200. To support the album, two more singles were released: "Dear Future Husband" and "Like I'm Gonna Lose You", the latter featuring American singer John Legend. Both peaked in the top 15 on the Billboard Hot 100 and were certified multi-platinum in the United States. The latter also reached number one in Australia and New Zealand.

On March 4, 2016, Trainor released "No" as the lead single from her second studio album, Thank You. The song charted at number three on the Billboard Hot 100, earning a double platinum certification from the RIAA. "Me Too", released as the second single from the album on May 5, 2016, peaked at number 13 on the Billboard Hot 100, and was certified triple platinum by the RIAA. Thank You, released on May 6, 2016, debuted at number three on the Billboard 200, and was certified platinum by the RIAA. "Better" was released as the third single from the album. The lead single from Trainor's third studio album, Treat Myself, called "No Excuses" was released on March 1, 2018, and charted at number 46 on the Billboard Hot 100, being certified platinum by the RIAA. "Let You Be Right" and "Can't Dance" were originally released as the second and third singles from the album respectively, but did not make the final cut. On February 11, 2019, "All the Ways" was serviced to hot adult contemporary radio as the lead single from Trainor's second EP, The Love Train, which was released on February 8, 2019. Treat Myself, released on January 31, 2020, debuted at number 25 on the Billboard 200. It was further promoted with its second and third singles, "Wave" and "Nice to Meet Ya", the latter of which reached number 89 on the Billboard Hot 100. Trainor's fourth studio album, and debut Christmas album, A Very Trainor Christmas, was released on October 30, 2020. Trainor released her fifth studio album, Takin' It Back, on October 21, 2022. Timeless, her sixth studio album, was released on June 7, 2024.

== Albums ==
=== Studio albums ===
List of studio albums, with selected chart positions, sales figures and certifications
Title	Album details	Peak chart positions										Sales	Certifications
Title	Album details	US	AUS	AUT	CAN	GER	NL	NZ	SWE	SWI	UK	Sales	Certifications
Title	Released: January 9, 2015; Label: Epic; Formats: CD, LP, digital download, CD+DVD	1	1	13	1	14	16	1	5	2	1	WW: 1,800,000 (Note: Global sales of Title as of December 2015.); US: 1,007,000 (Note: Sales of Title in the United States as of January 2016.)	RIAA: 3× Platinum; ARIA: 3× Platinum; BPI: Platinum; BVMI: Gold; GLF: Platinum; MC: 5× Platinum; NVPI: Gold; RMNZ: 5× Platinum
Thank You	Released: May 13, 2016; Label: Epic; Formats: CD, LP, digital download	3	3	20	4	25	20	5	22	16	5	US: 282,872 (Note: Sales of Thank You in the US as of December 2016.)	RIAA: Platinum; ARIA: Gold; BPI: Silver; MC: Platinum; RMNZ: Platinum
Treat Myself	Released: January 31, 2020; Label: Epic; Formats: CD, LP, digital download	25	13	67	25	99	87	40	—	28	41		
A Very Trainor Christmas	Released: October 30, 2020; Label: Epic; Formats: CD, LP, digital download, cassette	89	—	—	70	44	42	—	42	—	— (Note: A Very Trainor Christmas did not enter the UK Albums Chart, but peaked at number 47 on the UK Download Albums chart.)		
Takin' It Back	Released: October 21, 2022; Label: Epic; Format: CD, LP, digital download, cassette	16	30	—	21	—	19	—	—	98	67		RMNZ: Gold
Timeless	Released: June 7, 2024; Label: Epic; Format: CD, LP, digital download, streaming	27	23	55	48	—	—	—	—	97	12		
Toy with Me	Released: April 24, 2026; Label: Epic; Format: CD, LP, digital download, cassette, streaming	198	53	—	—	—	—	—	—	—	—		
"—" denotes items which were not released in that country or failed to chart.

==== Independent albums ====
List of independent albums, with track listings
Title	Album details
Meghan Trainor	Released: December 25, 2009; Label: Self-released; Formats: CD, digital download; Track listing: 1. "I'll Wake Up for You"; 2. "Waterfalls"; 3. "Quite the Adventure"; 4. "Locked in Love"; 5. "Falling"; 6. "Don't Fall Tonight"; 7. "Don't Let Me Down"; 8. "Hey Mr."; 9. "Overdrive"; 10. "Learning to Say I Love You"; 11. "See You Smile"; 12. "One Chance"; 13. "No Matter What You Do"; 14. "Want Me to Stay"; 15. "You Got the Best of Me"; 16. "Dad"; 17. "Simple Love"; 18. "Take These Tears"
I'll Sing with You	Released: January 31, 2011; Label: Self-released; Formats: CD, digital download; Track listing: 1. "I'll Sing with You"; 2. "Sweet, Sweetie Pie"; 3. "Free to Fly" (featuring Mike Viprino); 4. "Back to My Home" (featuring Matthew Migliozzi); 5. "Love, Love, Love"; 6. "Whisper"; 7. "Out the Door"; 8. "Remember"; 9. "Hold on to the Ones You Love"; 10. "Why'd You Have to Go?"; Deluxe Edition; 11. "Take Care of Our Soldiers"
Only 17	Released: September 14, 2011 (Note: The release date for Only 17 was originally September 14, 2011, but is currently displayed as October 12, 2011, on Trainor's Myspace page.); Label: Self-released; Formats: CD, digital download; Track listing: 1. "Window"; 2. "Never Ever"; 3. "Single"; 4. "Something to Believe In"; 5. "This Love"; 6. "Tumble" (featuring Gary Trainor); 7. "Leave a Kiss"; 8. "When Did You Fall?"; 9. "Love Me More"; 10. "Pick Me Up"; 11. "Shoowap Shoowah" (featuring Gary Trainor); 12. "Broken Puzzle"; 13. "Cupid" (featuring Gary Trainor)

=== Live releases ===
List of live releases with notes
Title	Release details	Notes
Spotify Sessions	Released: February 27, 2015; Label: Epic; Formats: Streaming	A live acoustic release exclusively recorded for Spotify. It consists of live performances of "Lips Are Movin", "Title", "All About That Bass", Sam Smith's "Stay with Me", 5 Seconds of Summer's "Don't Stop", and Elvis Presley's "Can't Help Falling in Love".
Spotify Singles	Released: August 22, 2018; Label: Epic; Formats: Streaming	A live acoustic release exclusively recorded for Spotify. It consists of live performances of "Let You Be Right" and Sasha Sloan's "Normal".

== Extended plays ==
List of extended plays, with selected chart positions and sales figures
Title	EP details	Peak chart positions				Sales
Title	EP details	US	US Sales	CAN	DEN	Sales
Title	Released: September 9, 2014; Label: Epic; Formats: CD, digital download	15		17	35	US: 171,000 (Note: Sales of Title (EP) in the United States as of January 2015)
The Love Train	Released: February 8, 2019; Label: Epic; Format: Digital download, streaming	—	37	—	—	
"—" denotes items which were not released in that country or failed to chart.

== Singles ==
=== As lead artist ===
List of singles as lead artist, with selected chart positions and certifications, showing year released and album name
Title	Year	Peak chart positions										Certifications	Album
Title	Year	US	AUS	AUT	CAN	GER	NLD	NZ	SWE	SWI	UK	Certifications	Album
"All About That Bass"	2014	1	1	1	1	1	2	1	3	1	1	RIAA: Diamond; ARIA: 11× Platinum; BPI: 3× Platinum; BVMI: 3× Gold; GLF: 5× Platinum; IFPI AUT: Platinum; IFPI SWI: Platinum; MC: Diamond; RMNZ: 4× Platinum	Title
"Lips Are Movin"	2014	4	3	6	7	10	14	5	28	18	2	RIAA: 4× Platinum; ARIA: 5× Platinum; BPI: Platinum; BVMI: Gold; GLF: 2× Platinum; MC: 4× Platinum; RMNZ: 2× Platinum	Title
"Dear Future Husband"	2015	14	9	14	22	37	72	27	58	57	20	RIAA: 3× Platinum; ARIA: 5× Platinum; BPI: Platinum; BVMI: Gold; GLF: Platinum; MC: 4× Platinum; RMNZ: 3× Platinum	Title
"Like I'm Gonna Lose You" (featuring John Legend)	2015	8	1	—	8	—	38	1	67	69	99	RIAA: 4× Platinum; ARIA: 8× Platinum; BPI: Platinum; GLF: Platinum; MC: 7× Platinum; RMNZ: 6× Platinum	Title
"No"	2016	3	9	7	10	12	34	18	34	28	11	RIAA: 2× Platinum; ARIA: 4× Platinum; BPI: Platinum; BVMI: Gold; GLF: Platinum; MC: 3× Platinum; RMNZ: 2× Platinum	Thank You
"Me Too"	2016	13	4	60	9	62	—	— (Note: "Me Too" did not enter the NZ Top 40 Singles Chart, but peaked at number 10 on the NZ Heatseekers chart.)	—	—	84	RIAA: 3× Platinum; ARIA: 6× Platinum; BPI: Gold; BVMI: Gold; MC: 6× Platinum; RMNZ: 2× Platinum	Thank You
"Better" (featuring Yo Gotti)	2016	— (Note: "Better" did not enter the Billboard Hot 100, but peaked at number 35 on the Adult Pop Airplay chart.)	—	—	—	—	—	—	—	—	—		Thank You
"I'm a Lady" (from Smurfs: The Lost Village)	2017	— (Note: "I'm a Lady" did not enter the Billboard Hot 100, but peaked at number 40 on the Adult Pop Airplay chart.)	—	—	—	—	—	—	—	—	—	ARIA: Gold	Non-album single
"No Excuses"	2018	46	60	—	49	—	—	— (Note: "No Excuses" did not enter the NZ Top 40 Singles Chart, but peaked at number four on the NZ Heatseeker Singles Chart.)	— (Note: "No Excuses" did not enter the Swedish Singellista Chart, but peaked at number six on the Swedish Heatseeker Chart.)	73	70	RIAA: Platinum; ARIA: Platinum; BPI: Silver; MC: Platinum; RMNZ: Gold	Treat Myself
"Let You Be Right"	2018	— (Note: "Let You Be Right" did not enter the Billboard Hot 100, but peaked at number 18 on the Adult Pop Airplay chart.)	—	—	— (Note: "Let You Be Right" did not enter the Canadian Hot 100 but peaked at number 39 on the Hot Canadian Digital Song Sales chart.)	—	—	—	—	—	—		Non-album singles
"Can't Dance"	2018	—	—	—	—	—	—	—	—	—	—		Non-album singles
"Just Got Paid" (with Sigala and Ella Eyre featuring French Montana)	2018	— (Note: "Just Got Paid" did not enter the Billboard Hot 100, but peaked at number 24 on the Hot Dance/Electronic Songs chart.)	—	—	—	—	—	— (Note: "Just Got Paid" did not enter the NZ Top 40 Singles Chart, but peaked at number 19 on the NZ Hot Singles Chart.)	— (Note: "Just Got Paid" did not enter the Swedish Singellista Chart, but peaked at number five on the Swedish Heatseeker Chart.)	—	11	ARIA: Gold; BPI: Platinum; MC: Platinum; RMMZ: Platinum	Brighter Days
"Hey DJ" (with CNCO and Sean Paul)	2018	—	—	—	—	—	—	—	—	95	—		Non-album single
"All the Ways"	2019	— (Note: "All the Ways" did not enter the Billboard Hot 100, but peaked at number 16 on the Adult Pop Airplay chart.)	—	—	—	—	—	—	—	—	—		The Love Train (Note: This song is also included on the Target deluxe edition of Treat Myself.)
"With You" (with Kaskade)	2019	— (Note: "With You" did not enter the Billboard Hot 100, but peaked at number 12 on the Hot Dance/Electronic Songs chart.)	—	—	—	—	—	—	—	—	—		Non-album single
"Wave" (featuring Mike Sabath)	2019	— (Note: "Wave" did not enter the Billboard Hot 100, but peaked at number 44 on the Adult Pop Airplay chart.)	—	—	—	—	—	— (Note: "Wave" did not enter the NZ Top 40 Singles Chart, but peaked at number 35 on the NZ Hot Singles Chart.)	—	—	—		Treat Myself
"Nice to Meet Ya" (featuring Nicki Minaj)	2020	89	— (Note: "Nice to Meet Ya" did not enter the ARIA Singles Chart, but peaked at number 29 on the ARIA Digital Track Chart.)	—	— (Note: "Nice to Meet Ya" did not enter the Canadian Hot 100 but peaked at number 22 on the Hot Canadian Digital Song Sales chart.)	—	—	— (Note: "Nice to Meet Ya" did not enter the NZ Top 40 Singles Chart, but peaked at number 13 on the NZ Hot Singles Chart.)	—	—	88		Treat Myself
"Make You Dance" (Note: This song is only included on the deluxe edition of Treat Myself.)	2020	—	—	—	—	—	—	—	—	—	—		Treat Myself
"White Christmas" (featuring Seth MacFarlane)	2020	— (Note: "White Christmas" did not enter the Billboard Hot 100, but peaked at number 39 on the Adult Pop Airplay chart.)	—	—	—	—	—	—	—	—	—		A Very Trainor Christmas
"Rockin' Around the Christmas Tree" (Note: This song is only included on the deluxe edition of A Very Trainor Christmas.)	2021	—	—	—	—	—	—	—	—	—	—		A Very Trainor Christmas
"Bad for Me" (featuring Teddy Swims)	2022	— (Note: "Bad for Me" did not enter the Billboard Hot 100 but peaked at number 13 on the Digital Song Sales chart.)	—	—	— (Note: "Bad for Me" did not enter the Canadian Hot 100 but peaked at number 32 on the Hot Canadian Digital Song Sales chart.)	—	—	— (Note: "Bad for Me" did not enter the NZ Top 40 Singles Chart, but peaked at number 19 on the NZ Hot Singles Chart.)	—	—	— (Note: "Bad for Me" did not enter the UK Singles Chart, but peaked at number 57 on the UK Singles Downloads Chart.)	RMNZ: Gold	Takin' It Back
"Made You Look"	2022	11	3	16	7	26	17	2	21	19	2	ARIA: 3× Platinum; BPI: 2× Platinum; BVMI: Gold; GLF: Gold; IFPI AUT: Platinum; IFPI SWI: Platinum; MC: 4× Platinum; RMNZ: 3× Platinum	Takin' It Back
"Mother" (Note: "Mother" is only included on the deluxe edition of Takin' It Back.)	2023	— (Note: "Mother" did not enter the Billboard Hot 100, but peaked at number 19 on the Bubbling Under Hot 100 Singles chart.)	49	—	83	—	— (Note: "Mother" did not enter the Dutch Single Top 100, but peaked at number two on the Single Tip chart.)	— (Note: "Mother" did not enter the NZ Top 40 Singles Chart, but peaked at number eight on the NZ Hot Singles Chart.)	— (Note: "Mother" did not enter the Swedish Singellista Chart, but peaked at number one on the Swedish Heatseeker Chart.)	—	22	BPI: Silver; MC: Gold	Takin' It Back
"Alright" (with Sam Fischer)	2023	—	—	—	—	—	—	— (Note: "Alright" did not enter the NZ Top 40 Singles Chart, but peaked at number 25 on the NZ Hot Singles Chart.)	—	—	—		I Love You, Please Don't Hate Me
"Chicken Little" (with Spencer Sutherland)	2023	—	—	—	—	—	—	—	—	—	—		In His Mania (Deluxe)
"Mr Right" (with Mae Stephens)	2023	—	—	—	—	—	—	— (Note: "Mr Right" did not enter the NZ Top 40 Singles Chart, but peaked at number 15 on the NZ Hot Singles Chart.)	—	—	—		Non-album single
"Wrap Me Up" (with Jimmy Fallon)	2023	— (Note: "Wrap Me Up" did not enter the Billboard Hot 100, but peaked at number four on the Bubbling Under Hot 100 Singles chart.)	—	—	92	—	—	—	—	—	—		Holiday Seasoning
"Been Like This" (with T-Pain)	2024	— (Note: "Been Like This" did not enter the Billboard Hot 100, but peaked at number 15 on the Adult Pop Airplay chart.)	—	—	—	—	—	— (Note: "Been Like THis" did not enter the NZ Top 40 Singles Chart, but peaked at number three on the NZ Hot Singles Chart.)	—	—	40		Timeless
"To the Moon"	2024	—	—	—	—	—	—	— (Note: "To the Moon" did not enter the NZ Top 40 Singles Chart, but peaked at number 33 on the NZ Hot Singles Chart.)	—	—	—		Timeless
"Whoops"	2024	— (Note: "Whoops" did not enter the Billboard Hot 100 but peaked at number 25 on the Digital Song Sales chart.)	—	—	—	—	—	— (Note: "Whoops" did not enter the NZ Top 40 Singles Chart, but peaked at number 18 on the NZ Hot Singles Chart.)	—	—	94		Timeless
"Chasin'" (with Paris Hilton)	2024	— (Note: "Chasin'" did not enter the Billboard Hot 100, but peaked at number 16 on the Adult Pop Airplay chart.)	—	—	—	—	—	—	—	—	—		Infinite Icon
"Criminals" (Note: "Criminals" is only included on the deluxe edition of Timeless.)	2024	100	—	—	92	—	—	— (Note: "Criminals" did not enter the NZ Top 40 Singles Chart, but peaked at number 21 on the NZ Hot Singles Chart.)	—	—	— (Note: "Criminals" did not enter the UK Singles Chart, but peaked at number 18 on the UK Singles Downloads Chart.)		Timeless (Deluxe)
"Mind Reader" (with Mimi Webb)	2025	—	—	—	—	—	—	— (Note: "Mind Reader" did not enter the NZ Top 40 Singles Chart, but peaked at number 34 on the NZ Hot Singles Chart.)	—	—	—		Confessions
"Still Don't Care"	2025	—	—	—	—	—	—	—	—	—	—		Toy with Me
"Gifts for Me"	2025	—	—	—	—	—	—	—	— (Note: "Gifts for Me" did not enter the Swedish Singellista Chart, but peaked at number 5 on the Swedish Heatseeker Chart.)	—	—		Non-album single
"Get In Girl"	2026	—	—	—	—	—	—	— (Note: "Get in Girl" did not enter the NZ Top 40 Singles Chart, but peaked at number 33 on the NZ Hot Singles Chart.)	—	—	—		Toy with Me
"Shimmer"	2026	—	—	—	—	—	—	—	—	—	—		Toy with Me
"—" denotes items which were not released in that country or failed to chart.

=== As featured artist ===
List of singles as featured artist, with selected chart positions and certifications, showing year released and album name
Title	Year	Peak chart position										Certifications	Album
Title	Year	US	AUS	AUT	FRA	IRE	ITA	NL	NZ	SWI	UK	Certifications	Album
"Marvin Gaye" (Charlie Puth featuring Meghan Trainor)	2015	21	4	3	1	1	6	11	1	2	1	RIAA: 4× Platinum; ARIA: 4× Platinum; BPI: 2× Platinum; FIMI: 3× Platinum; IFPI SWI: Platinum; MC: 3× Platinum; RMNZ: 3× Platinum	Nine Track Mind
"Boys Like You" (Who Is Fancy featuring Meghan Trainor and Ariana Grande)	2015	— (Note: "Boys Like You" did not enter the Billboard Hot 100, but peaked at number 18 on the Bubbling Under Hot 100 Singles chart.)	—	—	—	—	—	44	26	—	—	RMNZ: Gold	Non-album singles
"Hands" (among Artists for Orlando)	2016	— (Note: "Hands" did not make the Billboard Hot 100, but did chart at number 30 on the US Pop Digital Songs chart.)	—	—	—	—	—	—	—	—	—		Non-album singles
"More than Friends" (Jason Mraz featuring Meghan Trainor)	2018	— (Note: "More than Friends" did not enter the Billboard Hot 100, but peaked at number 32 on the Adult Pop Airplay chart.)	—	—	—	—	—	—	—	—	—		Know.
"Ocean" (LunchMoney Lewis featuring Meghan Trainor)	2021	—	—	—	—	—	—	—	—	—	—		Non-album singles
"If You Love Her" (Forest Blakk featuring Meghan Trainor)	2021	—	—	—	—	—	—	—	—	—	—		Non-album singles
"Hands on Me" (Jason Derulo featuring Meghan Trainor)	2023	— (Note: "Hands" did not enter the Billboard Hot 100, but peaked at number 30 on the Pop Digital Songs chart.)	—	—	—	—	—	—	— (Note: "Hands on Me" did not enter the NZ Top 40 Singles Chart, but peaked at number 20 on the NZ Hot Singles Chart.)	—	—		Nu King
"Slippin'" (Paul Russell featuring Meghan Trainor)	2024	—	—	—	—	—	—	—	—	—	—		Again Sometime?
"Let It Snow! Let It Snow! Let It Snow!" (Brett Eldredge featuring Meghan Trainor)	2026	—	—	—	—	—	—	—	—	—	—		
"—" denotes items which were not released in that country or failed to chart.

=== Promotional singles ===
List of promotional singles, with selected chart positions and certifications, showing year released and album name
Title	Year	Peak chart positions										Certifications	Album
Title	Year	US	US Holiday Dig.	US Pop Digital	AUS	CAN	NZ Hot	PHI	SWE Heat.	UK	VEN	Certifications	Album
"Take Care of Our Soldiers"	2010	—	—	—	—	—	—	—	—	—	—		I'll Sing with You
"Who I Wanna Be"	2012	—	—	—	—	—	—	—	—	—	—		Non-album promotional single
"Better When I'm Dancin'"	2015	— (Note: "Better When I'm Dancin'" did not enter the Billboard Hot 100, but peaked at number one on the Bubbling Under Hot 100 Singles chart.)	—	25	76	93	—	99	14	—	99	RIAA: Platinum; ARIA: 4× Platinum; BPI: Platinum; GLF: Gold; MC: 3× Platinum; RMNZ: 2× Platinum	The Peanuts Movie
"Watch Me Do"	2016	—	—	36	—	—	—	—	—	—	—		Thank You
"I Love Me" (with LunchMoney Lewis)	2016	—	—	29	—	— (Note: "I Love Me" did not enter the Canadian Hot 100 but peaked at number 38 on the Hot Canadian Digital Song Sales chart.)	—	—	—	—	—		Thank You
"Mom" (featuring Kelli Trainor)	2016	—	—	24	—	—	—	—	—	—	—		Thank You
"Goosebumps"	2017	—	—	—	—	—	—	—	—	—	—		Thank You
"Throwback Love"	2017	—	—	—	—	—	—	—	—	—	—		Thank You
"Treat Myself"	2018	—	—	—	—	—	—	—	—	—	—		Treat Myself (Note: This song is only included on the Target deluxe edition of Treat Myself.)
"Badass Woman"	2019	—	—	—	—	—	—	—	—	—	—		Non-album promotional singles
"Hurt Me"	2019	—	—	—	—	—	—	—	—	—	—		Non-album promotional singles
"Run Like the River"	2019	—	—	—	—	—	—	—	—	—	—		Playmobil: The Movie
"Genetics"	2019	—	—	—	—	—	—	—	—	—	—		Treat Myself (Note: The album version of "Genetics" features the Pussycat Dolls.)
"I'll Be There for You"	2019	—	—	—	—	—	—	—	—	—	—		Non-album promotional single
"Workin' on It" (featuring Lennon Stella and Sasha Sloan)	2019	—	—	—	—	—	—	—	—	—	—		Treat Myself
"Evil Twin"	2019	—	—	—	—	—	—	—	—	—	—		Treat Myself
"Blink"	2020	—	—	—	—	—	—	—	—	—	—		Treat Myself
"You Don't Know Me"	2020	—	—	—	—	—	—	—	—	—	—		Treat Myself
"My Kind of Present"	2020	—	1	—	—	—	—	—	—	—	—		A Very Trainor Christmas
"Last Christmas"	2020	—	4	—	—	—	—	—	—	—	—		A Very Trainor Christmas
"Don't I Make It Look Easy"	2022	—	—	—	—	—	13	—	—	—	—		Takin' It Back
"Rainbow"	2023	—	—	—	—	—	—	—	—	—	—		Takin' It Back
"Jingle Bells" (Note: This song is only included on the 2023 Amazon Music and 2024 digital deluxe editions of A Very Trainor Christmas.)	2023	78	—	—	—	—	—	—	—	48	—		A Very Trainor Christmas
"Sweet Morning Heat" (from the Netflix Film Unfrosted) (with Jimmy Fallon)	2024	—	—	—	—	—	—	—	—	—	—		Unfrosted (Soundtrack from the Netflix Film)
"I Wanna Thank Me" (featuring Niecy Nash)	2024	—	—	—	—	—	—	—	—	86	—		Timeless
"Hate It Here"	2024	—	—	—	—	—	—	—	—	—	—		Timeless
"—" denotes items which were not released in that country or failed to chart.

== Other charted songs ==
List of other charted songs, with selected chart positions and certifications, showing year released and album name
Title	Year	Peak chart positions											Certifications	Album
Title	Year	US	US Hol.	AUT	BEL Tip	GER	NL	NOR	NZ	SWE	SWI	UK	Certifications	Album
"Title"	2014	100	—	—	—	—	—	—	9	—	—	—	RIAA: Gold; ARIA: Platinum; MC: Platinum; RMNZ: Platinum	Title
"I'll Be Home"	2014	—	— (Note: "I'll Be Home" did not enter the Holiday 100 but peaked at number 15 on the Holiday Digital Song Sales chart.)	35	24	31	54	31	—	35	41	70	ARIA: Gold; BPI: Gold; BVMI: Gold; GLF: Gold; RMNZ: Gold	I'll Be Home for Christmas, Title and A Very Trainor Christmas
"No Good for You"	2015	—	—	—	—	—	—	23	—	91	—	—		Title
"Baby, It's Cold Outside" (Brett Eldredge featuring Meghan Trainor)	2016	—	67	—	46	—	55	—	—	93	53	51	BPI: Silver	Glow
"It's Beginning to Look a Lot Like Christmas"	2021	—	— (Note: "It's Beginning to Look a Lot Like Christmas" did not enter the Holiday 100 but peaked at number 27 on the Holiday Digital Song Sales chart.)	—	—	—	—	—	—	—	—	—		A Very Trainor Christmas
"Holidays" (featuring Earth, Wind & Fire)	2021	—	— (Note: "Holidays" did not enter the Holiday 100 but peaked at number 10 on the Holiday Digital Song Sales chart.)	—	—	—	—	—	—	—	—	—		A Very Trainor Christmas
"Christmas Party"	2021	—	— (Note: "Christmas Party" did not enter the Holiday 100 but peaked at number 24 on the Holiday Digital Song Sales chart.)	—	—	—	—	—	—	—	—	—		A Very Trainor Christmas
"Naughty List"	2021	—	— (Note: "Naughty List" did not enter the Holiday 100 but peaked at number 49 on the Holiday Digital Song Sales chart.)	—	—	—	—	—	—	—	—	—		A Very Trainor Christmas
"Takin' It Back"	2022	—	—	—	—	—	—	—	— (Note: "Takin' It Back" did not enter the NZ Top 40 Singles Chart, but peaked at number 37 on the NZ Hot Singles Chart.)	—	—	—		Takin' It Back
"Kid on Christmas" (Pentatonix featuring Meghan Trainor)	2022	93	72	—	—	—	—	—	— (Note: "Kid on Christmas" did not enter the NZ Top 40 Singles Chart, but peaked at number 32 on the NZ Hot Singles Chart.)	—	—	—		Holidays Around the World
"—" denotes items which were not released in that country or failed to chart.

== Guest appearances ==
List of non-single guest appearances, with other performing artists, showing year released and album name
Title	Year	Other artist(s)	Album
"Brave Honest Beautiful"	2015	Fifth Harmony	Reflection
"Painkiller"	2015	Jason Derulo	Everything Is 4
"Good to Be Alive"	2015	None	The Peanuts Movie
"Forgive Me Father"	2016	DJ Khaled, Wiz Khalifa, Wale	Major Key
"Someday"	2016	Michael Bublé	Nobody but Me

== Music videos ==
List of music videos, showing year released and directors
Title	Year	Director(s)	Ref.
As lead artist
"All About That Bass"	2014	Fatima Robinson	
"Lips Are Movin"	2014	Philip Andelman	
"Dear Future Husband"	2015	Fatima Robinson	
"Like I'm Gonna Lose You"	2015	Constellation Jones	
"Better When I'm Dancin'"	2015	Philip Andelman	
"No"	2016	Fatima Robinson	
"Me Too"	2016	Hannah Lux Davis	
"Better"	2016	Tim Mattia	
"I'm a Lady"	2017	Hannah Lux Davis	
"No Excuses"	2018	Colin Tilley	
"Let You Be Right"	2018	Colin Tilley	
"Just Got Paid"	2018	Dano Cerny	
"Hey DJ"	2018		
"Foolish"	2019	Ryan Trainor	
"Marry Me"	2019	Toon53 Productions	
"All the Ways"	2019	Brian Petchers	
"With You"	2019	Spaced Visuals	
"Wave"	2019	Mathew Cullen	
"Nice To Meet Ya"	2020	Mathew Cullen	
"Make You Dance"	2020		
"Holidays"	2020	Sarah McColgan	
"My Kind of Present"	2021		
"Title"	2021	Anthony Phan	
"Bad for Me"	2022	Thom Kerr	
"Made You Look"	2022		
"Mother"	2023	Charm La'Donna	
"Alright"	2023		
"Wrap Me Up"	2023		
"Been Like This"	2024	Phillip R Lopez and Lauren Dunn	
"To the Moon"	2024	Phillip R Lopez	
"Whoops"	2024		
As featured artist
"Marvin Gaye" (Charlie Puth featuring Meghan Trainor)	2015	Marc Klasfeld	
"More than Friends" (Jason Mraz featuring Meghan Trainor)	2018	Darren Doane	
"Hands on Me" (Jason Derulo featuring Meghan Trainor)	2023		
