= 245 (disambiguation) =

245 may refer to:

- The year 245
- The year 245 BC
- 245 (number)
- "245", the name of a jazz instrumental by Eric Dolphy, featured on his 1960 album Outward Bound
- 245, the international country calling code for Guinea-Bissau.
- 245 Vera, a main-belt asteroid

== See also ==
- May 24
- 24/5 (song) – by Mimi Webb
