= Shimmer (Meghan Trainor song) =

Single by Meghan Trainor

from the album Toy with Me
- Released: April 24, 2026
- Length: 2:47
- Label: Epic
- Songwriters: Meghan Trainor; Caroline Pennell; Grant Boutin; Gabe Yaron
- Producer: Gabe Yaron

Meghan Trainor singles chronology
"Get In Girl" (2026)	"Shimmer" (2026)

Music video
- "Shimmer" on YouTube

"Shimmer" is a song by the American singer-songwriter Meghan Trainor. It was released coinciding with Trainor's seventh major-label studio album, Toy with Me (2026), as the third single. Trainor co-wrote the song with Caroline Pennell, Grant Boutin, and its producer Gabe Yaron.

== Background and concept ==
"The single after this is called 'Shimmer' and that's where we start to love ourselves [again] ... like, 'I don't sweat, I shimmer!' Like, 'I got this!'"

In 2026, Meghan Trainor made her return to music with the lead single of her seventh major-label studio album, Toy with Me, on November 12, 2025, "Still Don't Care", followed by the Christmas single "Gifts for Me" on November 21. Trainor would eventually go on to tease and release the song "Get In Girl" as the second single. Although soon after, she revealed that a song called "Shimmer" would follow as the third single from the album.

Trainor co-wrote "Shimmer" with Caroline Pennell, Grant Boutin, and its producer Gabe Yaron. According to Trainor, the song is about self-worth and "lov[ing] ourselves"; KJYO noted that the song "will help all those down get back up!" The music video for "Shimmer" accompanied the release of Toy with Me, both happening on April 24, 2026.

== Personnel ==
Credits were adapted from Tidal.

- Gabe Yaron – songwriter, producer, programming, keyboards, drums
- Meghan Trainor – lead vocals, songwriter, associated performer, background vocal, vocal producer, executive producer
- Grant Boutin – songwriter, vocal producer, programming, keyboards, drums
- Caroline Pennell – songwriter, background vocal
- Ellis – vocal producer, guitar, bass, programming, drums, keyboards
- Justin Trainor – engineer
- Randy Merrill – mastering
- Tom Norris – mixing

== Charts ==
Chart performance
Chart (2026)	Peak position
Honduras Anglo Airplay (Monitor Latino)	6
Nicaragua Anglo Airplay (Monitor Latino)	3
Nigeria Bubbling Under Hot 100 (TurnTable)	12
Nigeria Airplay (TurnTable)	66
US Pop Airplay (Billboard)	31
Venezuela Anglo Airplay (Monitor Latino)	9

== Release history ==
Release dates and formats
Region	Date	Format	Label(s)	Ref.
United States	May 5, 2026	Contemporary hit radio	Epic	
