= Get In Girl =

Single by Meghan Trainor

from the album Toy with Me
- Released: February 13, 2026
- Genre: Soul
- Length: 3:27
- Label: Epic
- Songwriters: Andrew Jackson; Delacey; Grant Boutin; Mark Schick; Meghan Trainor
- Producers: Grant Boutin; Mark Schick

Meghan Trainor singles chronology
"Gifts for Me" (2025)	"Get In Girl" (2026)	"Shimmer" (2026)

Music video
- "Get In Girl" on YouTube

"Get In Girl" is a song by the American singer-songwriter Meghan Trainor. It was released on February 13, 2026, through Epic Records. The song serves as the second single from Trainor's seventh studio album, Toy with Me (2026). Andrew Jackson, Delacey, Grant Boutin, Mark Schick co-wrote the song with Trainor, while Boutin and Schick produced it.

== Background and concept ==
"This song is for everyone who finally realized they deserve more. Sometimes you just need a song that reminds you that love shouldn't feel exhausting, and that leaving is okay and might be the most powerful thing you can do."

Following the release of the lead single of Trainor's seventh studio album, Toy with Me, on November 12, 2025, "Still Don't Care", the singer released a holiday single, titled "Gifts for Me", on November 21. Before the release of "Get In Girl", Trainor has teased the song several times.

Trainor co-wrote "Get In Girl" with Andrew Jackson, Delacey, Grant Boutin and Mark Schick, and it was produced by Boutin and Shick. According to Trainor, the song is about self-worth; The Manila Times noted that the song "centers on moving on from unsatisfying relationships". Musically, "Get In Girl" adopts 1960s orchestral soul sounds.

== Music video ==
A music video for "Get In Girl" was released on April 1, 2026. Phillip R Lopez directed the video, while South African-American actress Sasha Pieterse appears on it. Trainor performs with variety of dancers in the video.

== Personnel ==
Credits were adapted from Tidal.

- Meghan Trainor – lead vocals, songwriter, associated performer, background vocal, vocal producer
- Grant Boutin – songwriter, producer, drum machine
- Mark Schick – songwriter, producer, drum machine, guitar, keyboards, programmer
- Andrew Jackson – songwriter
- Delacey – songwriter
- Mark Rudin – associated performer
- Justin Trainor – background vocal, engineer
- Tim Levebre – bass
- Rob Humphries – drum
- Jon Yeasto – engineer
- Randy Merrill – mastering engineer
- Tom Norris – mixing engineer
- Boddy Hawk – strings

== Charts ==
=== Weekly charts ===
Weekly chart performance
Chart (2026)	Peak position
Guatemala Anglo Airplay (Monitor Latino)	13
Latvia Airplay (TopHit)	25
New Zealand Hot Singles (RMNZ)	33
Switzerland Airplay (MusicTrace)	16

=== Monthly charts ===
Monthly chart performance
Chart (2026)	Peak position
Latvia Airplay (TopHit)	36

== Release history ==
List of release dates and formats
Region	Date	Format(s)	Label	Ref.
Various	February 13, 2026	Digital download; streaming	Epic	
