= Only 17 =

Only 17 may refer to:

- Meghan Trainor's 2011 independent album.
- A parody song of Nelly's "Just a Dream" made by Rucka Rucka Ali.
