= Ghost of You =

2022 single by Mimi Webb

Single by Mimi Webb

from the album Amelia
- Released: 7 October 2022
- Length: 2:37
- Label: Epic
- Songwriters: Mimi Webb; Christopher Smith; Morten Ristorp; Nolan Sipe; Phil Plested; Stuart Price; Tia Scola
- Producers: Mimi Webb; Stuart Price; Risc

Mimi Webb singles chronology
"Goodbye" (2022)	"Ghost of You" (2022)	"Red Flags" (2023)

Music video
- "Ghost of You" on YouTube

"Ghost of You" is a song by British singer Mimi Webb from her debut studio album Amelia. It was released on 7 October 2022 through Epic Records as the second single from the album. The song debuted at its peak position of number 23 on the UK Singles Chart.

== Writing and inspiration ==
The song was inspired by Webb's "secret breakup" from her boyfriend. In an interview with The Sun, she said "It was about taking this sad experience and a difficult time and turning it into a really upbeat, moving-on song. It’s something I’ve been through recently and for me, the whole process of this song and releasing it is about putting your happiness first."

Further to this, Webb described how the song has a sense of "empowerment" at its heart, and the idea of placing your trust in "the universe". She said "There’s some real empowerment behind it and it’s about going, ‘There’s nothing I can do about it, it’s done, and all I know is that the universe has the best interests at heart for me and I have to go with it.'"

== Live performances ==
As part of its promotion, Webb performed the song on a variety of TV and radio shows. This included teaming up with the BBC Concert Orchestra at Maida Vale Studios for BBC Radio 2's Piano Room series. She was part of the line-up at the Capital Jingle Bell Ball in December 2022, where she also performed "Good Without", "House on Fire" and "24/5". Prior to this she appeared on the charity fundraising show Children in Need, aired on the BBC on 18 November 2022.

== Charts ==
Chart performance for "Ghost of You"
Chart (2022–2023)	Peak position
Czech Republic Airplay (ČNS IFPI)	7
Ireland (IRMA)	28
New Zealand Hot Singles (RMNZ)	21
UK Singles (OCC)	23

== Certifications ==
Certifications for "Ghost of You"
Region	Certification	Certified units/sales
United Kingdom (BPI)	Silver	200,000^{‡}
^{‡} Sales+streaming figures based on certification alone.
