= Ruby Gillman, Teenage Kraken (soundtrack) =

2023 soundtrack album

Ruby Gillman, Teenage Kraken (Original Motion Picture Soundtrack)

Film score by Stephanie Economou
- Released: June 30, 2023
- Recorded: 2023
- Studios: Abbey Road, London
- Genre: Film score
- Length: 64:48
- Label: Back Lot Music
- Producer: Stephanie Economou

Stephanie Economou chronology
About My Father (2023)	Ruby Gillman, Teenage Kraken (2023)	My Big Fat Greek Wedding 3 (2023)

Singles from Ruby Gillman, Teenage Kraken (Original Motion Picture Soundtrack)
- 1. "This Moment" Released: June 23, 2023

Ruby Gillman, Teenage Kraken (Original Motion Picture Soundtrack) is the soundtrack to DreamWorks Animation's 2023 film Ruby Gillman, Teenage Kraken, featuring the musical score composed and conducted by Stephanie Economou. The album also accompanied two original songs: "This Moment" by Mimi Webb and "Rise" by Freya Ridings. The former was released as a single on June 23, while the latter was released along with the soundtrack by Back Lot Music on June 30, 2023.

== Development ==
The producer and directors decide to go with a whole new sound than the traditional orchestra score in most animated films. In the summer of 2022, composer Stephanie Economou was given the script for the film, she had a meeting with the filmmakers to give her freedom to write the score her way and signed on as the official composer for the film, which was Economou's first animated feature film she had ever scored. While she was reading the script, she had heard sounds of dream pop and synth pop that became the basis for the score.

Economou's influences while making the score for the film are Beach House, Slowdive, M83, Jaguar Sun, Cocteau Twins, and The Cure, For the first theme suite she wrote for the film, which was Ruby's Theme, she wanted a melody that was going to reflect her life as an ordinary teenager. She played around finding a theme for her, and found something that was lyrical and heroic. Economou also experimented between styles and genres of music for the score. and for Chelsea, she used a poppy and more peppy sound that is a Pharrell type pop, like Missy Elliott. She also used world instruments like didgeridoo and vocals and conch shells, to bring in something new in film score.

Economou came up with synth pop sound while Ruby's on land, and a dream pop sound while Ruby's in the ocean, with a little bit of indie pop in between, which makes the story feels like a late 90's-early 2000s teen film where it was ordinary teenage life, with more guitars and synths, including a rubber bridge guitar.

Economou also brought in Ari Mason, in order to create a kraken language choir, which was in Scandinavian folklore. Inspired from old Norse syllables and invented syllables.

Economou also brought in musicians with instruments that have been rare in film score, which includes an omnichord, ocarina, conch shells, an electro acoustic harp and a Bohemian crystal instrument.

For the score, anything that was not orchestral Economou recorded as she is writing the music. For six months, she remotely recorded those sessions with the soloists.

The orchestra score recorded for six days at Abbey Road Studios in London, England. Economou also conducted her own score with the orchestra during the sessions.

Economou had earlier worked as an additional music producer and co-ordinator to Harry Gregson-Williams. She responded to the story, saying; "Ruby's character came across the page. She's such a relatable person, and so are so many of the other [characters], the mother relationship, the grandmother relationship. I think there's a lot of generational narrative in there that we can all relate to, which is quite universal."

Economou was involved in the creative process from the onset and given a lot of freedom, although the directors suggested the film's music should "feel special, having its own voice and part of the world building" and should not go traditional. She wrote a dream-pop and synth-pop to explore Ruby's life on land and underwater. Having an orchestral background, she experimented with traditional instrumentation and orchestra such as brass, strings, woodwinds and choir, juxtaposed with the eclectic sounds. For Ruby's theme, she used guitar, synthesizer and vocals, as well as bringing French horns and violins.

Since the town was also a character in itself, she tried to make it "grounded and less dreamy" which resulted in an indie pop music from the 1980s. She used effects to incorporate actual effects which were numerous textures coupled with the solo instruments to immerse with the world. The score was recorded at the Abbey Road Studios in London, with Hal Rosenfeld and Scott Michael Smith recording and mixing the orchestral portions. Co-directors Kirk DeMicco and Faryn Pearl, producer Kelly Cooney Cilella, their assistant Anna Eva Kotyza, co-producer Rachel Zusser, editor Michelle Mendenhall and story and editorial supervisor Jason Tenandar traveled to London, England, in order to help supervise and see the score of the film firsthand at Abbey Road. Economou's husband Jon Monroe plays guitar as one of the soloists. He experimented several electric guitars running through effects.

== Critical reception ==
James R. Whitson of Animated Views wrote "While I can't hum a single measure of Stephanie Economou's score from memory now, while watching I really enjoyed it. Two songs released with the movie, "This Moment" and "Rise", fit the tone and message of the story well but are otherwise your average by-the-numbers movie pop songs." Zach Youngs of InSession Film called the music as the "terrific addition to the story", and further wrote "With a score written by Stephanie Economou, the film is given an atmospheric and heroic mood in equal measure. Her dreamy pop that sounds like it's coming from underwater is the perfect coming of age sound." He also commented that the soundtrack "enriches Ruby's world rather than forcing a feeling onto it".

== Track listing ==
Ruby Gillman, Teenage Kraken (Original Motion Picture Soundtrack) track listing
No.	Title	Artist(s)	Length
1.	"Ruby Gillman, Teenage Kraken"		2:47
2.	"Sacred Right of Junior Prom"		1:02
3.	"The Squad"		1:03
4.	"Oceanside"		0:55
5.	"Life Is Not a Dress Rehearsal"		1:58
6.	"Alge-bae"		1:10
7.	"Diving In"		1:25
8.	"The Pulse"		1:09
9.	"Ruby Takes Control"		1:55
10.	"This Moment"	Mimi Webb	3:57
11.	"Behind the Lighthouse"		1:54
12.	"Chelsea van der Zee"		1:09
13.	"The Library"		2:17
14.	"Grandmamah"		1:50
15.	"Kingdom of the Kraken"		2:11
16.	"The History of Women Warriors"		3:34
17.	"Ruby's Great Escape"		0:30
18.	"Breakfast with the Gillmans"		1:36
19.	"'Welcome to Your New Home!'"		0:39
20.	"Nothing Like a Mother's Panic"		1:23
21.	"Uncle Brill Spills the Sea Water"		1:02
22.	"Family Secrets"		2:55
23.	"Underwater Rescue"		1:39
24.	"Mother Flippin' Mermaid"		1:54
25.	"Captain Gordon and the Kraken Krew"		2:08
26.	"The Trident of Oceanus"		0:44
27.	"Ready to Train"		0:43
28.	"What Lies Beneath the Surface"		0:50
29.	"The Well of Seas"		1:17
30.	"A Home in Shambles"		2:24
31.	"Agatha's Return"		1:38
32.	"The Whirlpool"		2:14
33.	"Nerissa"		1:53
34.	"Your Own Path"		1:56
35.	"Queen-Making Moment"		2:05
36.	"No More Hiding"		2:00
37.	"Rise"	Freya Ridings	3:02
Total length:			64:48
