= Goodbye (Mimi Webb song) =

2021 single by Mimi Webb

Single by Mimi Webb
- Released: 26 May 2022
- Length: 3:04
- Label: Epic
- Songwriters: Mimi Webb; Casey Smith; Gian Stone; Pablo Bowman; Ross Golan
- Producer: Gian Stone

Mimi Webb singles chronology
"House on Fire" (2022)	"Goodbye" (2022)	"Ghost of You" (2022)

Music video
- "Goodbye" on YouTube

"Goodbye" is a song by British singer and songwriter Mimi Webb. It was released on 26 May 2022, through Epic Records. The song debuted at its peak of number 74 on the UK Singles Chart dated 3 June 2022.

== Charts ==
Chart performance for "Goodbye"
Chart (2022)	Peak position
New Zealand Hot Singles (RMNZ)	36
UK Singles (OCC)	74
