= Dumb Love (Mimi Webb song) =

2021 single by Mimi Webb

Single by Mimi Webb

from the EP Seven Shades of Heartbreak
- Released: 11 June 2021
- Length: 3:27
- Label: Epic
- Songwriter: Mimi Webb

Mimi Webb singles chronology
"Good Without" (2021)	"Dumb Love" (2021)	"24/5" (2021)

Music video
- "Dumb Love" on YouTube

"Dumb Love" is a song by British singer Mimi Webb, from her debut EP, Seven Shades of Heartbreak. It was released on 11 June 2021, through Epic Records. The song debuted at its peak of number 12 on the UK Singles Chart dated 18 June 2021. It received certifications in three countries, including being certified silver in the UK.

== Writing and inspiration ==
Taken from Seven Shades of Heartbreak which as a collection of songs, according to Harper's Bazaar, "narrates the stages of healing", the song itself "also lays out the nuances of lyrical heartbreak".

Webb said about the EP "I wanted to create around different feelings and the idea of explaining my seven stages. The song "Dumb Love" was that part of the EP where it was great. [At that point,] everything was lovely, fresh, and new. It was nostalgic because you were going back into a situation you had not visited for a long time. Yeah, "Dumb Love" was definitely an exciting part because it was much more lighthearted and loving than other songs."

== Charts ==
Chart performance for "Dumb Love"
Chart (2021)	Peak position
Australia (ARIA)	43
Ireland (IRMA)	12
New Zealand (Recorded Music NZ)	24
Sweden (Sverigetopplistan)	69
UK Singles (OCC)	12
US Mainstream Top 40 (Billboard)	36

== Certifications ==
Certifications for "Dumb Love"
Region	Certification	Certified units/sales
Australia (ARIA)	Platinum	70,000^{‡}
New Zealand (RMNZ)	Platinum	30,000^{‡}
Norway (IFPI Norway)	Gold	30,000^{‡}
United Kingdom (BPI)	Gold	400,000^{‡}
Streaming
Sweden (GLF)	Gold	4,000,000^{†}
^{‡} Sales+streaming figures based on certification alone.^{†} Streaming-only figures based on certification alone.
