= Toy with Me =

- Standard cover

Studio album by Meghan Trainor
- Released: April 24, 2026
- Studios: IMRSV (Stockholm, Sweden); Studio 112 (Jonstorp, Sweden)
- Genre: Pop
- Length: 42:42
- Label: Epic
- Producers: Emily Bear; Grant Boutin; Ellis; Steve Mac; Pete Nappi; Mike Sabath; Mark Schick; Justin Trainor; Adam Yaron; Gabe Yaron

Meghan Trainor chronology
Timeless (2024)	Toy with Me (2026)

Singles from Toy with Me
- 1. "Still Don't Care" Released: November 12, 2025; 2. "Get In Girl" Released: February 13, 2026; 3. "Shimmer" Released: May 5, 2026

Toy with Me is the seventh studio album by the American singer-songwriter Meghan Trainor. It was released on April 24, 2026, by Epic Records. Toy with Me is a pop record with influences of doo-wop; its message centers on confidence, self-image, and public perception, with the lyrics incorporating internet slang, pop culture references, and romantic innuendo.

Trainor was scheduled to embark on a thirty-three-show concert tour in support of Toy with Me, which was canceled in April 2026. The album was supported by three singles, "Still Don't Care", "Get In Girl", and "Shimmer". Critics believed it lacked innovation and compared the material to the work of other artists, but they praised its aesthetics and found the album catchy. Toy with Me underperformed commercially reaching number 198 on the US Billboard 200 and number 53 in Australia. Its deluxe edition was released three days after the standard album.

== Background and theme ==
Trainor released her sixth studio album, Timeless, in 2024. It debuted at number 27 on the US Billboard 200, though, the album spent only two weeks on the charts in the United Kingdom and the United States, and one in Australia.

While working on Toy with Me, Trainor said that she wanted the album to open with a song that would make listeners "feel unstoppable", describing it as the beginning of a new chapter in her artistic and personal life. Regarding the album's title, Toy with Me, Trainor explained that it continues her tradition of naming projects with the letter "T" that references her family name; she stated that the album's concept was influenced by her experiences with her children, aiming to evoke feelings of childhood comfort and simplicity. She described wanting listeners to feel "safe" and able to "dance and be happy" while listening. She also noted that the album's theme was shaped in part by negative attention she had received online.

== Composition ==
"Pink Cadillac"
Toy with Me includes pop and doo-wop elements; "Pink Cadillac" likewise features a doo-wop-influenced arrangement.

Co-written by Meghan Trainor, Toy with Me adopts prominent pop sounds, featuring 2020s trends alongside doo-wop influences. (Note: Attributed to Paste, Billboard, and Jenesaispop) The album also incorporates occasional country-inspired elements and ballads, while maintaining a dance-oriented pop approach throughout its track list. Its lyrics frequently concentrate on the themes of authenticity, empowerment, and individual freedom. They draw on internet slang and pop culture references while discussing confidence, self-image, and contain romantic or sexual innuendos. Trainor described Toy with Me as her "most honest and fearless.” The album also explores self-love, family life, and relationships, including references to Trainor's children and marriage counseling with her husband.

Trainor noted that the theme of "Get In Girl" is self worth. According to The Manila Times, the song "centers on moving on from unsatisfying relationships". Sydney Brasil of Exclaim! believed the song is a "Galentine's Day anthem", since it is centered on encouraging a friend to leave an unhealthy relationship with a "bum ass man". "Still Don't Care" was described by Trainor as her "most honest and fearless" track. It is a pop song influenced by the 1980s music, encouraging listeners to accept themselves and be confident in the face of judgment or adversity. Trainor's mother, brother, and sister-in-law offered background vocals for the song. Paste's Casey Epstein-Gross believed that "Potential" is similar to American singer Sabrina Carpenter's music. The fourth track, "Chef's Kiss", incorporates disco elements and presents a series of misfortunes directed at a subject.

"Pink Cadillac" juxtaposes themes of independence with sexual innuendo, set against a doo-wop-influenced arrangement featuring onomatopoeic lyrics; it draws on rock and roll and bubblegum sounds along with "Rich Man", which features prominent instrumentation like handclaps and horns alongside references to wealth and gender. "Angels" is a ballad track, while "Little One" is presented as a lullaby and contains a sample of a baby's voice. "Men's Tears" and "Delulu" draw on doo-wop influences. "Princess" includes lines such as "for this dress / 'Cause it hides that I'm broken", with "Cry Baby" likewise opening with lines "I feel hated, overwhelmed / Underrated, and all by myself" before shifting into a contrasting refrain. "Ladylike" combines contemporary slang and rhythmic vocalizations. At the same time, the title track portrays Trainor as a doll and includes suggestive lines like: "Toy with me, baby". Although much of the album revisits the doo-wop influences associated with Trainor's earlier work, its latter half shifts toward a more dance-oriented sound; songs such as "Hush" and "Shimmer" combine club-inspired and 1970s disco elements. The former further features elements of nu-disco, while the latter covers theme of self-love.

== Promotion and release ==
Trainor announced the release date of Toy with Me on November 12, 2025, along with the lead single, "Still Don't Care". She also revealed the album's cover art and pre-order. On February 13, 2026, "Get In Girl" served as the album's second single. Trainor released its Phillip R Lopez–directed music video on April 1, featuring South African-American actress Sasha Pieterse. Prior to the album's release, Trainor started to tease a song titled "Shimmer". On April 18, she released a teaser for the album, sharing its track list. Directed by American choreographer Charm La'Donna, Trainor's long-time collaborator, and filmed in Simi Valley, the music video for "Shimmer" was unveiled on the same day as Toy with Me's release. The deluxe edition was released on April 27, featuring four additional tracks: "Just Wanna Cry", "Receipts", "Theme Song", and "Heels". On May 5, "Shimmer" was sent to the US contemporary hit radio, becoming the album's third single.

=== Tour ===
On the same day of the album's announcement, Trainor revealed plans for a supporting concert tour of 33 shows, titled the Get In Girl Tour. It was scheduled to commence on June 12, 2026, at Pine Knob Music Theatre in Clarkston, Michigan, supported by Swedish duo Icona Pop. The tour would have included stops in major cities such as New York, Chicago, and Boston, before concluding on August 15, with a final performance at Kia Forum in Los Angeles. However, it was canceled on April 16, due to Trainor's desire to prioritize family commitments. She wrote on social media: "Balancing the release of a new album, preparing for a nationwide tour, and welcoming our new baby girl to our growing family of five has just been more than I can take on right now, and I need to be home and present for each and all of them at this time."

== Critical reception ==
Professional ratings
Review scores
Source	Rating
AllMusic	3.5/5 stars
Paste	D+
Jenesaispop	6.3/10

AllMusic's Matt Collar wrote that Toy with Me continues Trainor's tendency to blend multiple pop styles while retaining the upbeat and self-empowered tone associated with her earlier work. He highlighted the 1960s orchestral soul influences ("Get In Girl"), retro-inspired sounds ("Chef's Kiss", "Pink Cadillac", and "Princess"), and a stylistic shift in the album ("Hush" and "Shimmer"). Writing for Paste, Casey Epstein-Gross criticized Toy with Me for its reliance on 2020s pop trends; she argued that much of the album feels derivative of other artists, comparing several tracks to existing songs. She also highlighted the use of innuendo, describing songs like "Pink Cadillac" and the title track as excessive or awkward. Despite this, Epstein-Gross highlighted Trainor's vocal ability and felt the album was occasionally catchy—writing that tracks such as "Shimmer" and "Get In Girl" function as effective earworms, even as its "redundant bubblegum arrangements" and perceived lack of originality limit its overall impact. Jordi Bardají of Jenesaispop gave the album a mixed review, praising its "aesthetic consistency" while criticizing the inclusion of "a handful of forgettable cuts" and deeming it devoid of innovation. Washington Square News staff writer Annie Emans criticized Toy with Me for its use of "TikTok-ified lyrics and surface-level feminist themes", arguing that it does little to significantly develop Trainor's established sound or distinguish itself within 2020s pop trends.

== Commercial performance ==
Toy with Me debuted at number 53 in Australia and number 198 on the US Billboard 200 chart. Nick Bond of News.com.au described its debut as "disastrous" and "dramatic fall from grace" in contrast to her debut studio album, Title (2015), stating that Trainor is "suffer[ing] a series of brutal career setbacks". In the United Kingdom, it entered at number 40 on the UK Albums Sales component chart.

== Track listing ==
Toy with Me track listing
No.	Title	Writer(s)	Producer(s)	Length
1.	"Get In Girl"	Meghan Trainor; Grant Boutin; Delacey; Andrew Jackson; Mark Schick	Schnick; Boutin; M. Trainor^{[v]}	3:26
2.	"Still Don't Care"	M. Trainor; Caroline Ailin; Scott Harris; Steve Mac	Ellis; Gabe Yaron; Mac; M. Trainor^{[v]}	2:45
3.	"Potential"	M. Trainor; Boutin; Sean Douglas; Caroline Pennell	Boutin^{[p]}; M. Trainor^{[v]}	2:51
4.	"Chef's Kiss"	M. Trainor; Ailin; Boutin; Delacey; Schick	Boutin; Schick; M. Trainor^{[v]}	2:30
5.	"Pink Cadillac"	M. Trainor; Boutin; Douglas	Boutin^{[p]}; Ellis^{[a]}^{[v]}; M. Trainor^{[v]}	2:32
6.	"Angels"	M. Trainor; Emily Bear; Nicole Cohen; Hal Rosenfeld	Schick; Bear; M. Trainor^{[v]}	3:12
7.	"Little One"	M. Trainor; Mags Duval; Adam Yaron; G. Yaron	A. Yaron; G. Yaron; M. Trainor^{[v]}	2:11
8.	"Princess"	M. Trainor; Boutin; Poo Bear; Schick	Boutin; Ellis; Schick; M. Trainor^{[v]}	2:34
9.	"Rich Man"	M. Trainor; Boutin; Cohen; Pennell	Boutin^{[p]}; M. Trainor^{[v]}	2:26
10.	"Delulu"	M. Trainor; Pennell; Ryan Trainor; G. Yaron	G. Yaron; M. Trainor^{[v]}	2:30
11.	"Men's Tears"	M. Trainor; Boutin; Laura Veltz; Madi Yanofsky	Boutin; Schick; M. Trainor^{[v]}	2:35
12.	"Cry Baby"	M. Trainor; Mike Sabath	Sabath	2:36
13.	"Ladylike"	M. Trainor; Jesse Fink; Pete Nappi	Schick; Nappi; Boutin^{[a]}	3:01
14.	"Toy with Me"	M. Trainor; Justin Trainor; R. Trainor	G. Yaron; J. Trainor; M. Trainor^{[v]}	2:14
15.	"Hush"	M. Trainor; Ailin; Douglas; Sabath	Sabath; Ellis^{[a]}; M. Trainor^{[v]}	2:32
16.	"Shimmer"	M. Trainor; Boutin; Pennell; G. Yaron	Boutin^{[p]}; Ellis^{[p]}; G. Yaron^{[p]}; M. Trainor^{[v]}	2:47
Total length:				42:42

Digital deluxe edition
No.	Title	Writer(s)	Producer(s)	Length
17.	"Just Wanna Cry"	Pennell; Boutin; M. Trainor; R. Trainor	Ellis; Boutin^{[p]}	2:27
18.	"Receipts"	Ailin; Ellis; M. Trainor; Douglas	Ellis; M. Trainor^{[v]}	3:08
19.	"Theme Song"	Yaron; Boutin; M. Trainor; Douglas	Yaron^{[p]}; Boutin^{[p]}; M. Trainor^{[v]}	2:19
20.	"Heels"	J. Trainor; M. Trainor; Douglas; Zach Skelton	Boutin; J. Trainor; Skelton; M. Trainor^{[v]}	2:44
Total length:				53:29

=== Notes ===
- ^{^[p]} indicates a producer and vocal producer.
- ^{^[a]} indicates an additional producer.
- ^{^[v]} indicates a vocal producer.
- "Cry Baby" and "Ladylike" are not included on physical editions, but appear on a bonus 7-inch vinyl included at Target.

== Credits and personnel ==
Credits are adapted from the liner notes and Tidal.

=== Recording locations ===
- IMRSV Studios; Stockholm, Sweden (strings: 6, 7, 10–12)
- Studio 112; Jonstorp, Sweden (horns: 6, 10–12)

=== Musicians ===
- Meghan Trainor – lead vocals, background vocals
- Justin Trainor – background vocals (1, 2, 9), programming (14)
- Grant Boutin – drum machine (1), programming (3–5, 8–11, 16); drums, keyboards (3–5, 8, 9, 11, 16); guitar (5); background vocals, bass (9)
- Mark Schick – guitar, programming (1, 4, 6, 8, 11); keyboards (1, 4, 6, 8), drum machine (1), drums (4, 6, 11), bass (4)
- Bobby Hawk – strings (1, 4, 9)
- Mark Rudin – horn, tenor saxophone, trombone, trumpet (1, 9); baritone saxophone (9)
- Tim Levebre – bass (1, 11)
- Rob Humphries – drums (1, 11)
- Ellis – programming (2, 5, 8, 16), guitar (5, 8, 15), drums (5, 8, 16), bass (5, 15, 16), keyboards (8, 16)
- Gabe Yaron – programming (2, 7, 14, 16), guitar (2, 10), bass (2), keyboards (7, 10, 16), background vocals (10), drums (16)
- Steve Mac – keyboards, programming (2)
- Alex Flecha-Hirsch – background vocals (2)
- Kelli Trainor – background vocals (2)
- Scott Hoying – background vocals (2)
- Caroline Pennell – background vocals (3, 9, 10, 16)
- Matt Zara – guitar (3, 11)
- Cody Dear – horn (3)
- Caroline Ailin – background vocals (4)
- Delacey – background vocals (4)
- Mattias Bylund – strings (6, 7, 10, 11, 14), string synthesizer (6, 10, 11, 14), horn (7, 10, 14)
- Antonio Roland – cello (6, 7, 10, 11, 14)
- Fredrik Syberg – violin (6, 7, 10, 11, 14)
- Lola Torrente – violin (6, 7, 10, 11, 14)
- Josep Castanyer Alonso – cello (6, 7, 10, 11)
- Daniela Bonfiglioli – violin (6, 7, 10, 11)
- Jannika Gustafsson – violin (6, 7, 10, 11)
- Jonna Simonsson – violin (6, 7, 10, 11)
- Oscar Treitler – violin (6, 7, 10, 11)
- Daniel Thorell – cello (6, 7, 10, 14)
- Åsa Wirdefeldt – violin (6, 7, 10, 14)
- Sigrid Granit – double bass (6, 7, 10)
- Emilie Hörnlund – viola (6, 7, 10)
- Daniel Migdal – violin (6, 7, 10)
- Anna Roos Stefansson – violin (6, 7, 11, 14)
- Tomas Jonsson – baritone saxophone, tenor saxophone (6, 10, 11, 14)
- Wojtek Goral – alto saxophone (6, 10, 11, 14)
- Andreas Andersson – horn (6, 10, 11, 14)
- Peter Noos Johansson – trombone (6, 10, 11, 14)
- Janne Bjerger – trumpet (6, 10, 11, 14)
- Magnus Johansson – trumpet (6, 10, 11, 14)
- David Bukovinszky – cello (6, 10, 11)
- Mattias Johansson – violin (6, 10, 11)
- Hal Rosenfeld – programming (6), drums (10, 14)
- Vidar Andersson Meilink – viola (6, 11, 14), violin (6)
- Christopher Öhman – viola (6, 11, 14)
- Conny Lindgren – violin (6, 11, 14)
- Pelle Hansen – cello (6, 11), viola (6)
- Erik Uusijärvi – cello (6, 11)
- Lukas Elgmo – strings (6, 11)
- Louisa Kaufeldt – viola (6, 11)
- Gabriel Cornet – violin (6, 11)
- Iskandar Komilov – violin (6, 11)
- Paul Waltman – violin (6, 11)
- Erik Holm – viola (6, 14)
- Emily Bear – horn, programming, strings (6)
- Kristina Winiarski – cello (6)
- Benjamin Ziai – double bass (6)
- Carl Vallin – violin (6)
- Stockholm Studio Orchestra – orchestra (7, 10, 11, 14)
- Vicki Powell – viola (7, 10, 11)
- Claudia Bonfiglioli – violin (7, 10, 14)
- Filip Lundberg – cello (7, 10, 14)
- Bård Ericson – double bass (7, 10)
- James Opie – viola (7, 10)
- Riikka Repo – viola (7, 10)
- Veronika Novotna – violin (7, 10)
- Riley Trainor – background vocals (7, 15)
- Barry Trainor – background vocals (7)
- Adam Yaron – guitar (7)
- Gary Trainor – background vocals (9)
- Daryl Sabara – background vocals (9)
- Kole – background vocals (9)
- Steve Jekanowski – background vocals (9)
- Erik Arvinder – conductor (10, 11, 14)
- Maggie O'Mara – background vocals (10)
- Ryan Trainor – background vocals (10)
- Zena Wozniak – background vocals (14)
- Hillevi Rasmusson Klingberg – cello (14)
- Drew Taubenfeld – guitar (14)
- Erikka Nylund – viola (14)
- Aleksander Sätterström – violin (14)
- Karin Eriksson – violin (14)
- Martin Stensson – violin (14)
- Sofie Sunnerstam – violin (14)
- Yong-Min Lee – violin (14)
- Mike Sabath – background vocals (15)
- Distant Cowboy – cello (15)
- Sarena Hsu – violin (15)

=== Technical ===
- Justin Trainor – engineering
- Jon Yeasto – engineering (1, 11)
- Willem Bleeker – engineering (6, 7, 10, 11)
- Erik Arvinder – engineering (6, 7, 10, 14)
- Mattias Bylund – engineering (10, 11, 14), editing (6, 7, 10, 11, 14)
- Basma Jabbar – engineering (14)
- Meghan Trainor – vocal engineering (2)
- Scott Hoying – vocal engineering (2)
- Tom Norris – mixing
- Randy Merrill – mastering

== Charts ==
Chart performance
Chart (2026)	Peak position
Australian Albums (ARIA)	53
UK Albums Sales (OCC)	40
US Billboard 200	198

== Release history ==
Release dates and formats
Region	Date	Format(s)	Version	Label	Ref.
Various	April 24, 2026	Cassette; CD; digital download; streaming; vinyl LP	Standard	Epic	
Various	April 27, 2026	Digital download; streaming	Deluxe	Epic	
