= Seven Shades of Heartbreak =

EP by Mimi Webb
- Released: 22 October 2021
- Length: 22:10
- Label: Epic

Mimi Webb chronology
Seven Shades of Heartbreak (2021)	Amelia (2023)

Singles from Seven Shades of Heartbreak
- 1. "Good Without" Released: 26 March 2021; 2. "Dumb Love" Released: 11 June 2021; 3. "24/5" Released: 10 September 2021; 4. "Halfway" Released: 22 October 2021

Seven Shades of Heartbreak is the debut extended play by British singer Mimi Webb. It was released on 22 October 2021 through Epic Records and peaked at number 9 on the British Chart.

== Track listing ==
Seven Shades of Heartbreak track listing
No.	Title	Writer(s)	Producer(s)	Length
1.	"Dumb Love"	Mimi Webb; Amie Miriello; Garen Gueyikian; Johnny Black	Johnny Black; Garen Gueyikian	3:26
2.	"24/5"	Webb; Fridolin Walcher; Sam Merrifield	Freedo	2:38
3.	"Little Bit Louder"	Webb; Sean Douglas; Benjamin Kohn; Pete Kelleher; Tom Barnes	TMS	2:35
4.	"Heavenly"	Webb; Andrew Jackson; Duck Blackwell; Nick Gale	Digital Farm Animals; Duck	4:03
5.	"Halfway"	Webb; Cleo Tighe; Philip Plested; Kelleher; Barnes; Kohn	TMS	3:17
6.	"Good Without"	Webb; Walcher; Merrifield	Freedo	3:02
7.	"Lonely in Love"	Webb; Peter Rycroft; Andrew Murray; James Birt; James Murray; Mustafa Omer; Tom Mann	Mojam; Lostboy	3:06

== Charts ==
Chart performance for Seven Shades of Heartbreak
Chart (2021)	Peak position
Irish Albums (OCC)	18
Norwegian Albums (VG-lista)	27
Scottish Albums (OCC)	15
Swiss Albums (Schweizer Hitparade)	94
UK Albums (OCC)	9

== Certifications ==
Certifications for Seven Shades of Heartbreak
Region	Certification	Certified units/sales
Norway (IFPI Norway)	Gold	10,000^{‡}
United Kingdom (BPI)	Silver	60,000^{‡}
^{‡} Sales+streaming figures based on certification alone.
