= House on Fire (Mimi Webb song) =

2022 single by Mimi Webb

Single by Mimi Webb

from the album Amelia
- Released: 18 February 2022
- Length: 2:20
- Label: Epic
- Songwriters: Mimi Webb; Pablo Bowman; Charlie Martin; Ines Dunn; Joe Housley
- Producers: Cirkut; The Nocturns

Mimi Webb singles chronology
"Halfway" (2021)	"House on Fire" (2022)	"Goodbye" (2022)

Music video
- "House on Fire" on YouTube

"House on Fire" is a song by British singer Mimi Webb. It was released on 18 February 2022 through Epic Records as the lead single from her debut studio album Amelia. The song debuted at number six on the UK Singles Chart, making it her highest debut on the chart.

== Critical reception ==
The song was described as a "catchy, self-incriminating song". Taking her previous singles into account, Tomás Mier of Rolling Stone called Webb the "queen of breakups". The "upbeat production" was viewed as the singer showing another side of the singer. Billboard writer Jason Lipshutz included the song on the "10 cool new pop songs" list of the week, saying that "Webb has dropped a wondrous, biting pop track". He also drew comparisons to Canadian singer Tate McRae: by "singing in this tale of heartbroken arson", Webb combines elements of both "a major-key pop refrain and hit a revenge-fantasy pose". In a mixed review, Jenessa Williams of The Guardian awarded the song 3 out of 5 stars, praising her vocal abilities while calling her songs "unimaginative" and sticking to a "well-rehearsed formula".

== Commercial performance ==
In Ireland, Webb earned her highest chart entry with the song so far. Debuting at number six in the United Kingdom on 25 February 2022, she also reached her highest charting song there, surpassing "Good Without", which had previously peaked at number eight in early 2021. In the United States, the song also surpassed "Good Without" as her highest charting effort on Mainstream Top 40, before being later surpassed by "Red Flags".

== Music video ==
The music video was released on 18 February 2022 and was directed by KLVDR. It features shots of Webb setting the house of her ex-boyfriend on fire after he had cheated on her. She is then seen dancing with firefighters and posing next to nurses.

== Cover versions ==
Fellow British singer George Ezra covered the song during a BBC Radio 1 Live Lounge performance, in addition to performing his song "Green Green Grass" on 19 May.

== Charts ==
=== Weekly charts ===
Chart performance for "House on Fire"
Chart (2022)	Peak position
Canada CHR/Top 40 (Billboard)	40
Czech Republic Airplay (ČNS IFPI)	12
Global 200 (Billboard)	196
Ireland (IRMA)	5
New Zealand Hot Singles (RMNZ)	8
Norway (VG-lista)	40
Sweden Heatseeker (Sverigetopplistan)	1
UK Singles (OCC)	6
US Mainstream Top 40 (Billboard)	32

=== Year-end charts ===
2022 year-end chart performance for "House on Fire"
Chart (2022)	Position
UK Singles (OCC)	42

== Certifications ==
Certifications for "House on Fire"
Region	Certification	Certified units/sales
Denmark (IFPI Danmark)	Gold	45,000^{‡}
United Kingdom (BPI)	Platinum	600,000^{‡}
^{‡} Sales+streaming figures based on certification alone.
