= Confessions (Mimi Webb album) =

- Standard cover

Studio album by Mimi Webb
- Released: 12 September 2025
- Length: 34:17
- Labels: Epic; RCA
- Producers: Grant Boutin; Ryan Daly; Jason Evigan; Peter Fenn; Manuel Lara; Connor McDonough; Riley McDonough; Pete Nappi; Bowman Pablo; Jordan Riley; Risc; John Ryan; Federico Vindver; Adam Yaron; Gabe Yaron

Mimi Webb chronology
Amelia (2023)	Confessions (2025)

Singles from Confessions
- 1. "Mind Reader" Released: 2 May 2025; 2. "Love Language" Released: 6 June 2025; 3. "You Don't Look at Me the Same" Released: 21 August 2025

Confessions is the second studio album by British singer Mimi Webb. It was released on 12 September 2025, via Epic Records and RCA Records. The album was supported by three singles: "Mind Reader", "Love Language" and "You Don't Look at Me the Same". A deluxe edition was released on 20 February 2026, along with its lead single, "Eyes Closed".

== Background and theme ==
Earlier in 2025, Webb had shared "Mind Reader", a collaboration with American singer Meghan Trainor. Alongside the release of "Love Language", she announced her second studio album titled Confessions. Speaking about the track, Webb described it as "my first step into this new era", adding that she had "never been more nervous or excited to share a piece of music", and that its sound and aesthetic were "so new and different" for her.

Written and produced between Los Angeles and London, Confessions follows her 2023 debut Amelia. Reflecting on its creation, Webb explained: "I dug deep and figured out what I want to say not just as an artist, but as a person. I decided to be brutally honest. It's easy to be like, 'Everything is wonderful'—even when there's so much happening behind the curtain. I wanted to open up and scream, 'This is who I am!'." She further added: "I am so proud of this album. Confessions has helped me grow both as a person and as an artist. The themes I was able to explore through these songs taught me so much about myself and gave me real confidence. I'm also incredibly proud of the creative side of this record – every video, every photoshoot holds so much of me. This project, as a whole, is the most authentically 'me' thing I've ever done."

== Composition ==
According to Hot Press, Webb has described herself as believing in "the power of the universe", a perspective that informs the themes of Confessions. The album has been characterised as Webb telling her truth about the "Mimi-verse" and wearing her heart on her sleeve.

=== Songs ===
Webb described "You Don't Look at Me the Same" as "the most vulnerable song I've ever released". She explained that it was written from the perspective of a child observing two loved ones grow apart, and said the process of writing the song was therapeutic, hoping it would bring comfort and understanding to listeners. For "I Met a Boy", she noted it as one of the more unique tracks on the album, noting its R&B influences and its relatability to experiences of unrequited attraction.

== Promotion ==
"Mind Reader", the lead single from the album, was released on 2 May 2025. The album's second single, "Love Language", was released on 6 June 2025. The second single, "You Don't Look at Me the Same", was released on August 21. "I Met a Boy" was accompanied by a music video directed by Avesta Keshtmand.

To support the album, Webb embarked on the Confessions Tour across the United Kingdom and Europe from September 29 to October 7, 2025, with Grace Gachot joining as the opening act for the UK and Ireland dates. On 20 February 2026, a deluxe edition of the album was released, titled Confessions: An Unexpected Turn of Events; "Eyes Closed" served as the edition's lead single.

== Critical reception ==
Professional ratings
Review scores
Source	Rating
Dork	3/5

Newton Felicity of Dork described Confessions as a sharp and self-aware follow-up to Amelia, balancing playful, radio-ready pop anthems like "Love Language" and "Mind Reader" with vulnerable ballads such as "You Don't Look at Me the Same", ultimately portraying Webb as more honest and emotionally complex than before.

== Track listing ==
Confessions track listing
No.	Title	Writer(s)	Producer(s)	Length
1.	"My Go"	Amelia Anne Webb; Jordan Riley; Tom Mann; Andrew Jackson	Riley^{[p]}	2:27
2.	"Love Language"	Riley; Webb; Amy Allen; Mann	Grant Boutin; Riley^{[p]}; Tom Norris^{[a]}	2:58
3.	"Mind Reader" (with Meghan Trainor)	Meghan Trainor; Webb; Boutin; Nicole "Kole" Cohen; Federico Vindver	Boutin; Vindver; Norris^{[a]}	2:32
4.	"Narcissist"	Webb; Riley; Mann	Riley^{[p]}	2:46
5.	"Kiss My Neck"	Webb; Peter Fenn; Caroline Pennell	Fenn^{[p]}	2:46
6.	"I Love You for Me"	Webb; Allen; John Ryan	Ryan	2:49
7.	"You Don't Look at Me the Same"	Connor McDonough; Riley McDonough; Toby McDonough; Ryan Daly; Castle; Webb	C. McDonough; R. McDonough; Daly	2:44
8.	"I Met a Boy"	Webb; Pablo Bowan; Jason Evigan; Castle; Manuel Lara	Bowan; Evigan^{[p]}; Lara	2:58
9.	"Side Effects"	Webb; Phil Plested; Christopher Smith; Cleo Tighe	Risc	2:55
10.	"Crashing Out"	Webb; Cohen; Trainor; Adam Yaron; Gabe Yaron	A. Yaron; G. Yaron; Trainor^{[v]}	2:43
11.	"Rom Com"	Webb; Madison Love; Julia Michaels; Pete Nappi	Nappi^{[p]}	3:14
12.	"Confessions"	Webb; Castle; Riley; Mann	Riley^{[p]}	3:25
Total length:				34:17

Confessions: An Unexpected Turn of Events deluxe edition
No.	Title	Writer(s)	Producer(s)	Length
1.	"Stay Single"	Webb; Allen; Evan Blair	Blair^{[p]}	2:28
2.	"Eyes Closed"	Webb; Allen; Riley; Mann	Riley^{[p]}; Mann^{[a]}	2:26
3.	"That Girl"	Webb; Charlie Martin; Jake Torrey; Bowan	Martin^{[p]}	2:53
4.	"Girls Know"	Webb; Riley; Mann	Riley^{[p]}; Mann^{[a]}	3:03
5.	"Ends in Y"	Webb; Riley; Mann	Riley^{[p]}; Mann^{[a]}	2:53
Total length:				48:00

=== Notes ===
- ^{^[p]} signifies a primary and vocal producer.
- ^{^[a]} signifies an additional producer.

== Personnel ==
Credits were adapted from Tidal.

=== Musicians ===
- Mimi Webb – lead vocals (all tracks), background vocals (tracks 2, 3, 5, 6, 10, 11)
- Jordan Riley – instrumentation (1, 4, 12); bass, drums, guitar, keyboards, programming (2)
- Grant Boutin – background vocals, bass synthesizer, drums, keyboards, programming (2, 3); synthesizer (3)
- Meghan Trainor – background vocals (3, 10), lead vocals (3)
- Kole – background vocals (3, 10)
- Federico Vindver – keyboards, programming (3)
- Peter Fenn – instrumentation (5)
- John Ryan – instrumentation, background vocals (6)
- Amy Allen – background vocals (6)
- Connor McDonough – instrumentation, background vocals, programming (7)
- Riley McDonough – instrumentation, background vocals, programming (7)
- Ryan Daly – instrumentation, background vocals, programming (7)
- Toby McDonough – background vocals (7)
- Pablo Bowman – background vocals, bass (8)
- Jason Evigan – guitar (8)
- Benjamin Alerhand – piano (8)
- Adam Yaron – background vocals, programming (10)
- Justin Trainor – background vocals (10)
- Gabe Yaron – programming (10)
- Pete Nappi – instrumentation (11)
- Julia Michaels – background vocals (11)
- Madison Love – background vocals (11)

=== Technical ===
- Tom Norris – mixing
- Randy Merrill – mastering
- Jordan Riley – engineering (1, 2, 4, 12)
- Federico Vindver – engineering (3)
- Peter Fenn – engineering (5)
- John Ryan – engineering (6)
- Connor McDonough – engineering, vocal engineering (7)
- Riley McDonough – engineering, vocal engineering (7)
- Ryan Daly – engineering, vocal engineering (7)
- Jackson Rau – engineering (8)
- Jason Evigan – engineering (8)
- Manuel Lara – engineering (8)
- Adam Yaron – engineering (10)
- Gabe Yaron – engineering (10)
- Pete Nappi – engineering (11)
- Meghan Trainor – vocal engineering (10)
- Grayson Pollard – additional engineering (10)
- Justin Trainor – additional engineering (10)
- Jamie Sprosen – engineering assistance (6)
- Jeff Gunnell – engineering assistance (6)

== Charts ==
List of chart performance
Chart (2025)	Peak position
Scottish Albums (Official Charts)	20
UK Albums (Official Charts)	81

== Release history ==
List of release dates and formats
Region	Date	Format(s)	Version	Label	Ref.
Various	12 September 2025	Cassette; CD; digital download; LP; streaming	Standard	Epic; RCA	
Various	20 February 2026	Digital download; streaming	Deluxe	Epic; RCA	
