= Amelia (Mimi Webb album) =

Studio album by Mimi Webb
- Released: 3 March 2023
- Genre: Pop
- Length: 34:33
- Label: Epic
- Producers: Mimi Webb; Andrew Wells; Cirkut; Connor McDonough; Risc; Ryan Daly; Stuart Price; The Nocturns

Mimi Webb chronology
Seven Shades of Heartbreak (2021)	Amelia (2023)	Confessions (2025)

Singles from Amelia
- 1. "House on Fire" Released: 18 February 2022; 2. "Ghost of You" Released: 7 October 2022; 3. "Red Flags" Released: 13 January 2023; 4. "Roles Reversed" Released: 17 February 2023; 5. "Freezing" Released: 3 March 2023; 6. "Last Train to London (I Won't Look Back)" Released: 28 April 2023

Amelia is the debut studio album by British singer Mimi Webb, released on 3 March 2023 through Epic Records. It was preceded by the singles "House on Fire", "Ghost of You", "Red Flags" and "Roles Reversed", while "Freezing" was released on the same date as the album. A week after the album's release, Webb began the Amelia Tour, visiting the UK and Europe.

== Background ==
Webb worked on the album for three years and called it "the best version of me" and asked listeners "to accept vulnerability without judgement while you listen to this record". Amelia is named for Webb's full first name, with Webb stating that there are "two sides" of her that she wants "people to get to know [...] Amelia, the girl from the UK countryside who loves to be at home with her family, friends, and dogs; and Mimi, the pop artist who loves to be up on stage traveling the world". Webb announced the album on 12 October 2022, following the release of the second single "Ghost of You".

== Critical reception ==
Professional ratings
Aggregate scores
Source	Rating
Metacritic	70/100
Review scores
Source	Rating
The Daily Telegraph	3/5 stars
DIY	3/5 stars
The Line of Best Fit	7/10
MusicOMH	4/5 stars

Amelia received a score of 70 out of 100 on review aggregator Metacritic based on four critics' reviews, indicating "generally favorable" reception. Otis Robinson of DIY called Amelia a "dependable, invigorating debut (chock full of unforgettable earworms) and its strengths lie in its biggest moments: particularly, those with clear Scandipop influences, like the Dagny-esque 'Freezing' and Sigrid-like, bubble-gummy 'Ghost of You'". Bethan Eyre of The Line of Best Fit described the album as "jam packed with tracks soon to be on everyone's pre-drinks playlist come the weekend", finding that "although it may be straightforward, quintessential pop music, it is catchy quintessential pop music done well". Ben Devlin, reviewing the album for musicOMH, felt that Amelia "isn't a concept record in the slightest, instead it's 12 pristinely-written tunes, eight of which are about break-ups (another two about rocky relationships) and despite the personal implications of the album's title these lyrics are defiantly general", also calling Webb "certainly a pleasant singer, her voice sounding like a less babyish Tate McRae". Devlin concluded that the album "knows what it wants to do and pursues this with relentless efficiency". Kathleen Johnston, writing for The Daily Telegraph called all of the songs "undeniably well-made and catchy" but opined that the album "veers into all-too predictable territory in places, such as with 'Is it Possible'".

== Track listing ==
Amelia – standard edition
No.	Title	Writer(s)	Producer(s)	Length
1.	"The Other Side"	Mimi Webb; Andrew Wells; Tom Mann; Bluf; James Abrahart	Wells	2:45
2.	"Red Flags"	Webb; Henry Walter; Castle; Connor McDonough; Riley McDonough; Toby McDonough; Ryan Daly	Cirkut; C. McDonough; Daly	2:21
3.	"Roles Reversed"	Webb; Castle; T. McDonough; R. McDonough; C. McDonough; Daly	C. McDonough; Daly	3:45
4.	"House on Fire"	Webb; Pablo Bowman; Charlie Martin; Ines Dunn; Joe Housley	Cirkut; The Nocturns	2:19
5.	"Both of Us"	Webb; Philip Plested; Dunn; Bowman; Peter Rycroft	Lostboy	2:46
6.	"Freezing"	Webb; Dunn; Bowman; Martin; Housley	Wells; The Nocturns	2:56
7.	"Last Train to London"	Webb; T. McDonough; R. McDonough; C. McDonough; Daly	C. McDonough; Daly	3:47
8.	"Ghost of You"	Webb; Christopher Smith; Morten Ristorp; Nolan Sipe; Plested; Stuart Price; Tia Scola	Price; Risc; Rissi^{[c]}	2:37
9.	"Is It Possible"	Webb; David Stewart; Jessica Agombar	Stewart	3:32
10.	"Remind You"	Webb; Plested; Rycroft	Lostboy	2:56
11.	"See You Soon"	Webb; Louis Schoorl; Jonny Hockings; Shaun Farrugia	Fraser T. Smith; Schoorl	2:38
12.	"Amelia"	Webb; Camille Purcell; Bowman; Richard Boardman; Nicholas Gale	Digital Farm Animals	2:11
Total length:				34:33

Amelia – digital reissue edition bonus track
No.	Title	Writer(s)	Producer(s)	Length
13.	"Last Train to London (I Won't Look Back)"	Webb; T. McDonough; R. McDonough; C. McDonough; Daly	C. McDonough; Daly; Finneas	3:53
Total length:				38:34

Note

- ^{^[c]} signifies a co-producer.

== Personnel ==
- Mimi Webb – vocals
- Dave Kutch – mastering
- Manny Marroquin – mixing (1–6)
- Connor McDonough – mixing (7), engineering (2, 3)
- Ryan Daly – mixing (7), engineering (2, 3)
- Rob Kinelski – mixing (9)
- Kevin "KD" Davis – mixing (10–12)
- Andrew Wells – engineering (1)
- The Nocturns – engineering (4, 6)
- Lostboy – engineering (5, 10)
- David Stewart – engineering (9)
- Louis Schoorl – engineering (11)
- Nick Gale – engineering (12)
- Adam Blake – keyboards (8)
- Stuart Price – keyboards, programming (8)
- Anthony Vilchis – engineering assistance (1–6)
- Trey Station – engineering assistance (1–6)
- Zach Pereyra – engineering assistance (1–6)
- Eli Heisler – engineering assistance (9)
- Tina Ibañez – art direction, design
- Joanna Weir – cover direction
- Becca Wheeler – photography
- Frank Fieber – photography

== Charts ==
Chart performance for Amelia
Chart (2023)	Peak position
Australian Digital Albums (ARIA)	41
Australian Hitseekers Albums (ARIA)	2
Belgian Albums (Ultratop Flanders)	148
Irish Albums (Official Charts)	5
Norwegian Albums (VG-lista)	19
Scottish Albums (Official Charts)	11
Swiss Albums (Schweizer Hitparade)	86
UK Albums (Official Charts)	4

== Certifications ==
Certifications for Amelia
Region	Certification	Certified units/sales
United Kingdom (BPI)	Silver	60,000^{‡}
^{‡} Sales+streaming figures based on certification alone.

== Release history ==
Release dates and formats for Amelia
Region	Date	Format(s)	Label	Ref.
Various	3 March 2023	Cassette; CD; digital download; streaming; vinyl	Epic	
