= Mind Reader (Mimi Webb and Meghan Trainor song) =

2025 single by Mimi Webb and Meghan Trainor

Single by Mimi Webb and Meghan Trainor

from the album Confessions
- Released: 2 May 2025
- Length: 2:32
- Label: Epic
- Songwriters: Meghan Trainor; Amelia Anne Webb; Grant Boutin; Nicole "Kole" Cohen; Federico Vindver
- Producers: Grant Boutin; Federico Vindver

Mimi Webb singles chronology
"One Eye Open" (2024)	"Mind Reader" (2025)	"Love Language" (2025)

Meghan Trainor singles chronology
"Criminals" (2024)	"Mind Reader" (2025)	"Still Don't Care" (2025)

Music video
- "Mind Reader" on YouTube

"Mind Reader" is a song by British singer Mimi Webb and American singer Meghan Trainor. It was released on 2 May 2025 through Epic Records, as the lead single from Webb's second studio album, Confessions (2025).

== Background ==
In May 2025, Webb released "Mind Reader", a collaboration with Meghan Trainor and her first single of the year. The track was co-written by Webb and Trainor, with production handled by Grant Boutin and Federico Vindver, and accompanied by a music video directed by Ava Rikki. Webb described Trainor as an artist she had long admired, noting that the song was written during their very first session together. After realizing the track suited Trainor's voice, Webb invited her to feature, to which Trainor immediately agreed. Trainor later called the experience "an absolute dream" saying she and her husband had long been fans of Webb and that she looked forward to dancing to the song throughout the summer. Trainor added in an interview at Wango Tango that her husband, Daryl Sabara, was "the biggest Mimi Webb fan" and had encouraged her to collaborate. She also revealed that she wrote the song's chorus the night before, inspired by wishing her husband could read her mind.

The track follows Webb's 2024 single "One Eye Open," and arrives after a year that saw her support the Jonas Brothers across UK and European arenas, tour with Benson Boone in the US, and perform at festivals including Governors Ball, Lollapalooza, Osheaga, and Outside Lands.

== Composition ==
Written by Webb and Trainor and produced by Grant Boutin and Federico Vindver, "Mind Reader" features lyrics in which the singers urge a partner to anticipate their needs and act accordingly. Webb delivers the first verse with lines emphasizing clarity of intention, while Trainor follows in the second verse, cautioning that failure to do so could risk losing the relationship.

== Charts ==
"Mind Reader" chart performance
Chart (2025)	Peak position
UK Sales Chart (OCC)	88
UK Downloads Chart (OCC)	82
