= Mimi Webb =

British singer (born 2000)

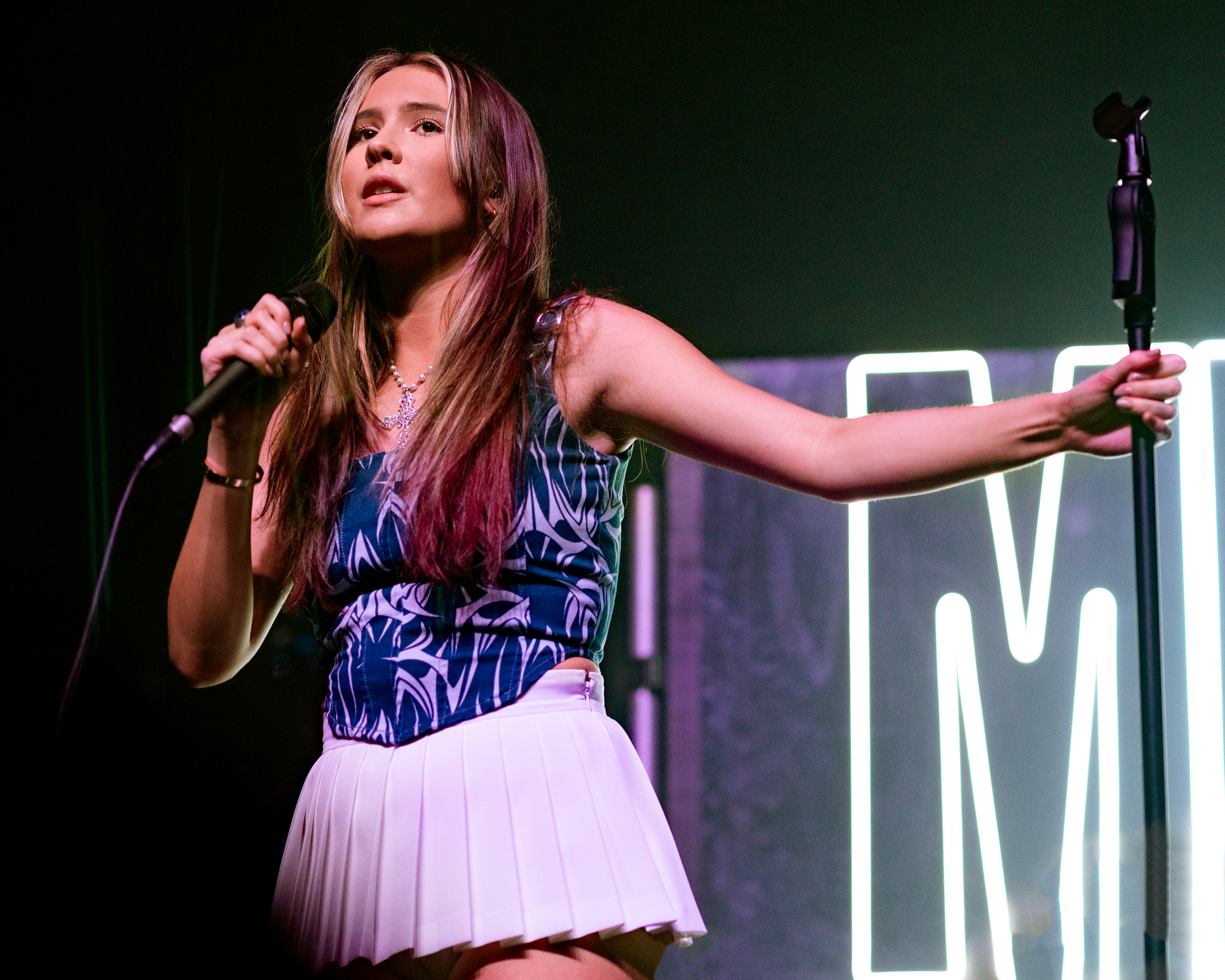
- Webb in 2022

Background information
- Born: Amelia Anne Webb; 23 July 2000 (age 26); Canterbury, England
- Genre: Pop
- Occupations: Singer; songwriter
- Instrument: Vocals
- Years active: 2020–present
- Label: Epic
- Member of: K/DA
- Website: www.mimiwebb.com

Amelia Anne "Mimi" Webb (born 23 July 2000) is an English singer and songwriter. In October 2021, she released her debut EP, Seven Shades of Heartbreak, which peaked at number nine on the UK Albums Chart, and included the singles "Good Without", "Dumb Love" and "24/5", which all placed on the UK singles chart. Webb released her debut studio album, Amelia, in March 2023, which spawned the successful singles "House on Fire", "Ghost of You" and "Red Flags". In September 2025, she released her second studio album Confessions.

== Early life ==
Webb was born on 23 July 2000. She attended the independent school Kent College in Canterbury. She learned guitar and piano, and began to write her own songs at age 13. She credits her piano teacher with encouraging a musical career when she was 15. She cites Adele, Amy Winehouse, Emeli Sandé, and Sam Smith among her influences, along with jazz/pop singers Louis Armstrong, Etta James, Ella Fitzgerald, and Nat King Cole.

At the age of 16, she moved to Brighton to attend Brighton Music College (part of the British and Irish Modern Music Institute). She participated with fellow students in musical performances and competitions. She visited Los Angeles in December 2018 with her artist manager to meet with record labels. In February 2019 at the age of 18, she signed with Epic Records.

== Career ==
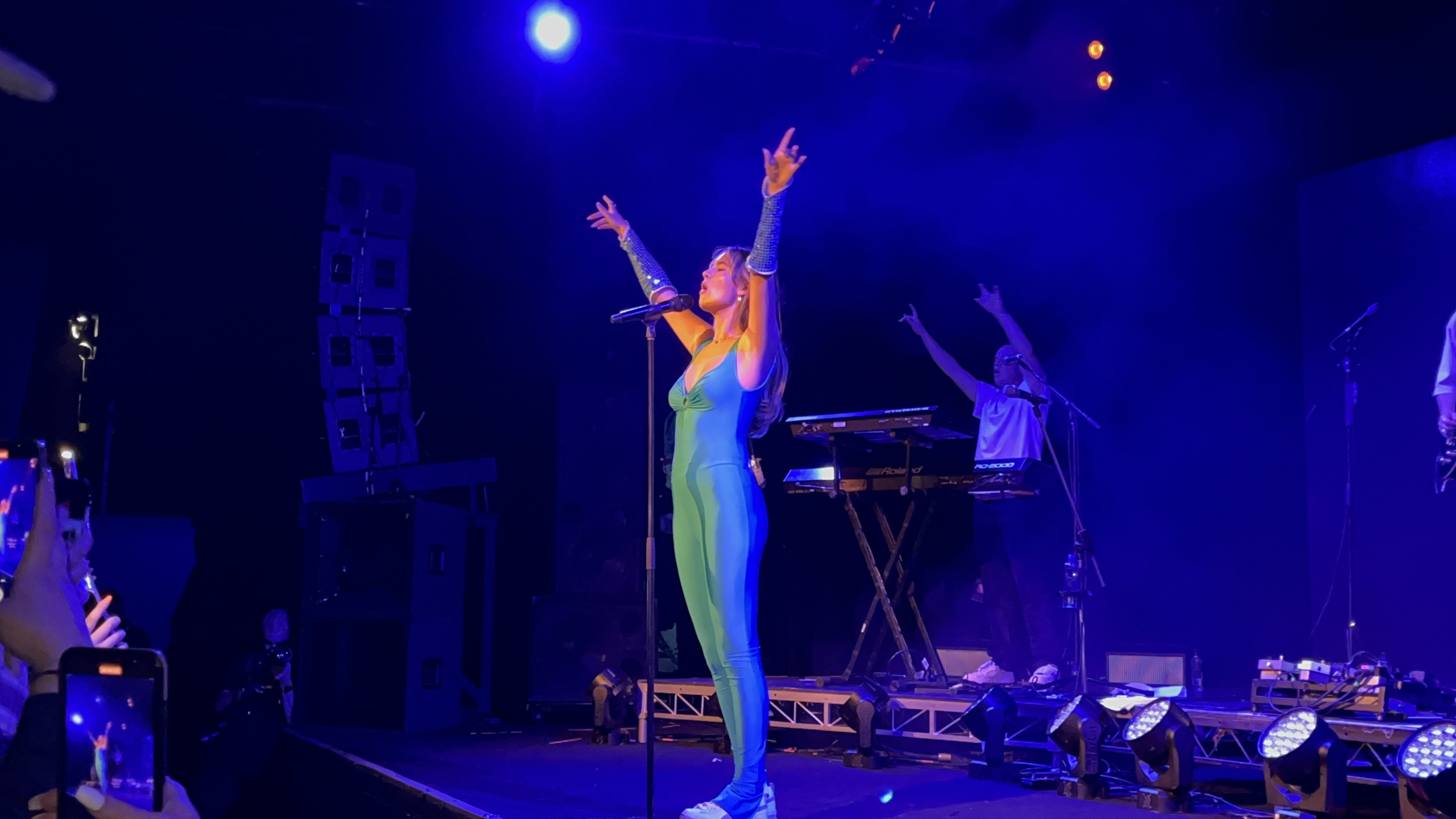
Webb performing in Sydney, Australia in September 2022.

At the age of 17, Webb was featured in a song by Young L3X titled "Karma", which also featured Amaan Bradshaw.

Webb released her debut single "Before I Go" in April 2020. The song was featured on Charli D'Amelio's TikTok posts, and gathered over 85 million views on the platform and over 25 million streams on Spotify. Her single "Reasons" was featured on BBC Radio 1, and in June 2021, her single "Good Without" peaked at number eight on the UK singles chart. Webb released her debut EP, Seven Shades of Heartbreak, on 22 October 2021. In November 2021, Webb performed at Hits Live in Liverpool, alongside other artists such as The Script, Mabel, Becky Hill, Joel Corry, Tom Grennan, Ella Henderson and Ed Sheeran.

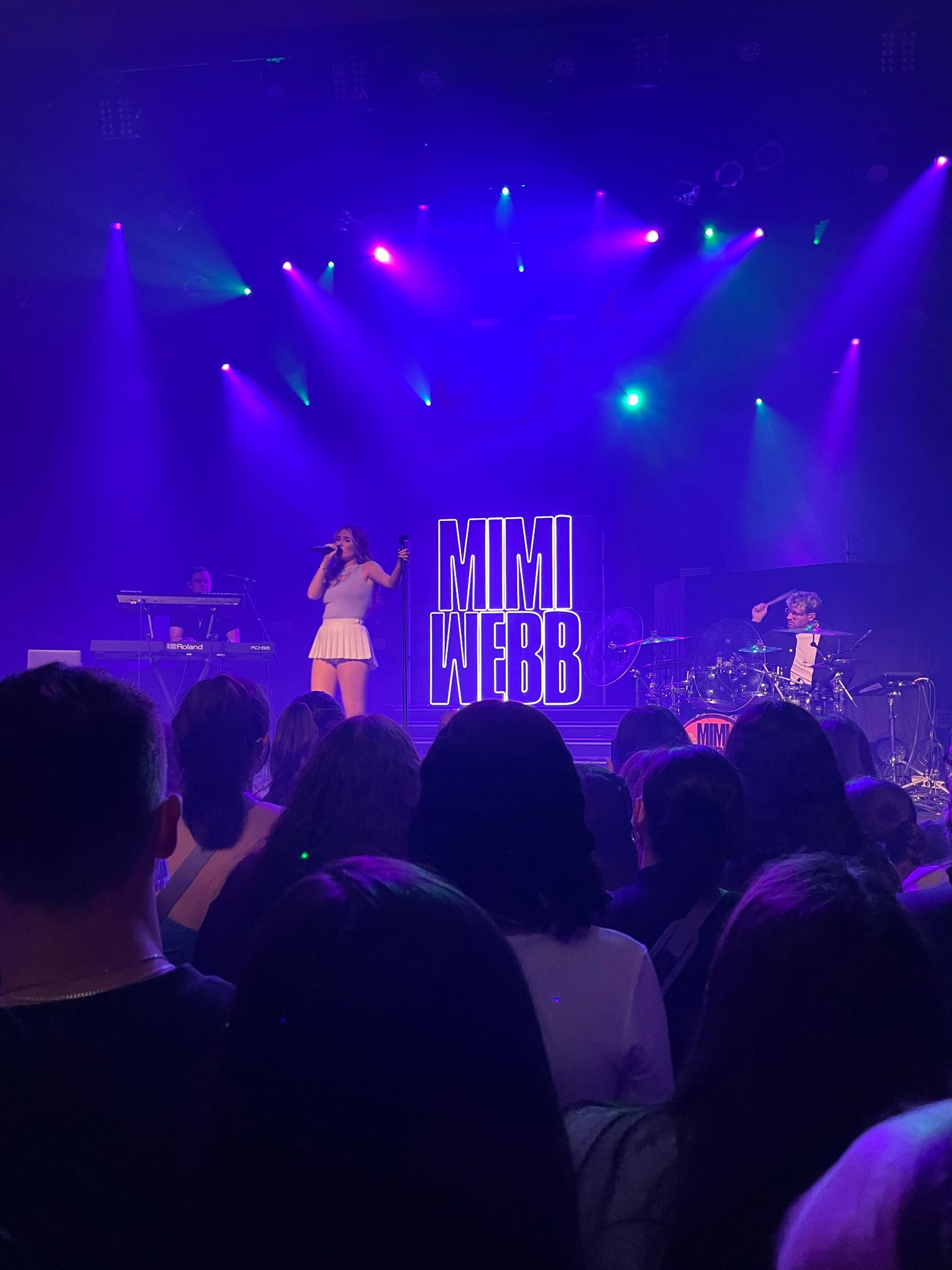
Webb performing in Montreal, Canada in April 2022

During March to April 2022, Webb embarked on her first North American tour, opening for Canadian singer Tate McRae. In June 2022, Webb performed at the Platinum Party at the Palace to celebrate the Platinum Jubilee of Queen Elizabeth II. In September 2022, Webb toured Australia and New Zealand for the first time, performing in Sydney, Brisbane, Melbourne and Auckland before embarking on a second North America tour for the year which spanned fourteen dates across three weeks, beginning in Vancouver, Canada on 22 September and concluding in Washington DC on 13 October. While on tour, she intended to release the single "Ghost of You" on 16 September, but delayed it by three weeks due to the death of Queen Elizabeth II. On 12 October, Webb announced that her debut album is titled Amelia and would be released on 3 March 2023.

In November 2022, she opened the BBC's Children in Need show. In January 2023, Webb received a nomination for "Best New Talent" ahead of the 2023 Brit Awards. The following day, she released the single "Red Flags". Webb embarked on the Amelia Tour from March to June 2023, beginning in Madrid, Spain and concluding in Cork, Ireland. On 12 April 2024 Webb released a new single titled "Mistake". On 4 June 2025, Webb announced that her second album will be titled Confessions with a release date of 12 September 2025. In December of 2025, Webb performed at Capital FM's Jingle Bell Ball.

In October 2026, Webb provided the singing voice of Kai'Sa, a character from League of Legends, on "Firestarter", a single by the virtual band K/DA.

== Discography ==
=== Studio albums ===
List of studio albums, with selected details, chart positions and certifications
Title	Album details	Peak chart positions							Certifications
Title	Album details	UK	AUS Dig.	BEL (FL)	IRE	NOR	SCO	SWI	Certifications
Amelia	Released: 3 March 2023; Label: Epic; Formats: LP, CD, digital download, streaming	4	41	148	5	19	11	86	BPI: Silver
Confessions	Released: 12 September 2025; Label: Epic; Formats: LP, CD, digital download, streaming	81	—	—	—	—	20	—	

=== Extended plays ===
List of extended plays, with selected details, chart positions and certifications
Title	EP details	Peak chart positions					Certifications
Title	EP details	UK	IRE	NOR	SCO	SWI	Certifications
Seven Shades of Heartbreak	Released: 22 October 2021; Label: Epic; Formats: CD, digital download, streaming	9	18	27	15	94	BPI: Silver; IFPI NOR: Gold

=== Singles ===
List of singles, with selected chart positions, certifications, year released and album name
Title	Year	Peak chart positions										Certifications	Album
Title	Year	UK	AUS	BEL (FL)	IRE	NLD	NOR	NZ	SWE	SWI	US Pop	Certifications	Album
"Before I Go"	2020	—	—	—	—	—	—	—	—	—	—		Non-album singles
"I'll Break My Heart Again"	2020	—	—	—	—	—	—	—	—	—	—		Non-album singles
"Reasons"	2021	85	—	—	—	—	—	—	—	—	—		Non-album singles
"Good Without"	2021	8	—	25	7	34	30	—	94	89	36	BPI: Platinum; ARIA: Gold; BEA: Gold; GLF: Gold; IFPI NOR: Platinum; IFPI SWI: Platinum; RMNZ: Gold	Seven Shades of Heartbreak
"Dumb Love"	2021	12	43	—	12	—	—	24	69	—	—	BPI: Gold; ARIA: Platinum; GLF: Gold; IFPI NOR: Gold; RMNZ: Platinum	Seven Shades of Heartbreak
"24/5"	2021	25	—	—	22	—	—	— (Note: "24/5" did not enter the NZ Top 40 Singles Chart, but peaked at number 25 on the NZ Hot Singles Chart.)	— (Note: "24/5" did not enter the Swedish Singellista Chart, but peaked at number four on the Swedish Heatseeker Chart.)	—	—	BPI: Silver	Seven Shades of Heartbreak
"Halfway"	2021	54	—	—	55	—	—	— (Note: "Halfway" did not enter the NZ Top 40 Singles Chart, but peaked at number 29 on the NZ Hot Singles Chart.)	—	—	—		Seven Shades of Heartbreak
"House on Fire"	2022	6	—	—	5	—	40	— (Note: "House on Fire" did not enter the NZ Top 40 Singles Chart, but peaked at number eight on the NZ Hot Singles Chart.)	— (Note: "House on Fire" did not enter the Swedish Singellista Chart, but peaked at number one on the Swedish Heatseeker Chart.)	—	32	BPI: Platinum	Amelia
"Goodbye"	2022	74	—	—	—	—	—	— (Note: "Goodbye" did not enter the NZ Top 40 Singles Chart, but peaked at number 36 on the NZ Hot Singles Chart.)	—	—	—		Non-album single
"Ghost of You"	2022	23	—	—	28	—	—	— (Note: "Ghost of You" did not enter the NZ Top 40 Singles Chart, but peaked at number 21 on the NZ Hot Singles Chart.)	—	—	—	BPI: Silver	Amelia
"Red Flags"	2023	12	—	—	12	—	—	— (Note: "Red Flags" did not enter the NZ Top 40 Singles Chart, but peaked at number 14 on the NZ Hot Singles Chart.)	—	—	28	BPI: Gold	Amelia
"Roles Reversed"	2023	99	—	—	88	—	—	—	—	—	—		Amelia
"Freezing"	2023	73	—	—	81	—	—	— (Note: "Freezing" did not enter the NZ Top 40 Singles Chart, but peaked at number 24 on the NZ Hot Singles Chart.)	—	—	—		Amelia
"Last Train to London (I Won't Look Back)"	2023	—	—	—	—	—	—	—	—	—	—		Amelia
"This Moment"	2023	—	—	—	—	—	—	—	—	—	40		Ruby Gillman, Teenage Kraken
"Back Home for Christmas"	2023	— (Note: "Back Home for Christmas" did not enter the UK Singles Chart, but peaked at number 85 on the UK Singles Sales Chart.)	—	—	—	— (Note: "Back Home for Christmas" did not enter the Dutch Single Top 100, but peaked at number 13 on the Single Tip chart.)	—	—	—	—	—		Non-album singles
"Mistake"	2024	—	—	—	—	—	—	—	—	—	—		Non-album singles
"Erase You"	2024	—	—	—	—	—	—	—	—	—	—		Non-album singles
"One Eye Open"	2024	—	—	—	—	—	—	—	—	—	—		Non-album singles
"Mind Reader" (with Meghan Trainor)	2025	— (Note: "Mind Reader" did not enter the UK Singles Chart, but peaked at number 88 on the UK Singles Sales Chart.)	—	—	—	—	—	— (Note: "Mind Reader" did not enter the NZ Top 40 Singles Chart, but peaked at number 34 on the NZ Hot Singles Chart.)	—	—	—		Confessions
"Love Language"	2025	—	—	—	—	—	—	—	—	—	—		Confessions
"You Don't Look at Me the Same"	2025	—	—	—	—	—	—	—	—	—	—		Confessions
"Narcissist"	2025	—	—	—	—	—	—	—	—	—	—		Confessions
"Eyes Closed"	2026	—	—	—	—	—	—	—	—	—	—		Confessions: An Unexpected Turn of Events
"Obsession"	2026	—	—	—	—	—	—	—	—	—	—		Nobody Wants This
"—" denotes a recording that did not chart or was not released in that territory.

== Tours ==
=== Headlining ===
- Amelia Tour (2023)
- The Confessions Tour (2025)

=== Opening act ===
- Tate McRae – Are We Flying Tour (2022)
- Benson Boone – Fireworks & Rollerblades World Tour (2024)
