= Still Don't Care =

Single by Meghan Trainor

from the album Toy with Me
- Released: November 12, 2025
- Genre: Pop
- Length: 2:50
- Label: Epic
- Songwriters: Caroline Ailin; Ellis Robert McKay Lawrie; Meghan Trainor; Scott Harris; Steve Mac
- Producers: Ellis; Gabe Yaron; Steve Mac

Meghan Trainor singles chronology
"Mind Reader" (2025)	"Still Don't Care" (2025)	"Gifts for Me" (2025)

Music video
- "Still Don't Care" on YouTube

"Still Don't Care" is a song by the American singer-songwriter Meghan Trainor. It was released on November 12, 2025, through Epic Records. Written by Caroline Ailin, Ellis Robert McKay Lawrie, Trainor, Scott Harris and Steve Mac, the song serves as the lead single from her seventh album under Epic, Toy with Me (2026). "Still Don't Care" is a pop song which concentrates on themes of self-confidence, freedom, and authenticity.

== Development and theme ==
Ahead of the announcement of "Still Don't Care", Trainor stated in an interview with People that the song was developed following an increase in comments about her appearance on social media. She said that users had described her as "too thin" and "unrecognizable", and noted that the shift in online responses led her to discuss the issue in therapy. Trainor explained that these conversations contributed to the concept of the song, summarizing its premise as reconsidering others' opinions and concluding, "I still don't care".

She also referenced themes that appear in the track, including remarks she had received throughout her life about "doing too much", and cited advice from her mother as influential in her approach to these experiences. Trainor described the song as a method of reinforcing a mindset she was attempting to adopt. In an interview with the Associated Press, she stated that the song was inspired by real-life reactions to posts documenting her health and fitness efforts, noting that she "didn't expect" the negative responses. Trainor added that she often writes from the perspective of how she "wishes" she thought, referencing previous self-acceptance songs, and noted that performing those tracks over time helped reinforce their messages.

== Promotion ==
In November 2025, Trainor previewed a new song titled "Still Don't Care" on Instagram, sharing a short video of herself lip-synching to the track while dancing. The teaser featured lyrics which addresses body image and public criticism, including references to comments about her weight and appearance. Trainor was spotted filming the accompanying music video for "Still Don't Care" across various locations in Los Angeles, including the Grove shopping complex.

== Music video ==
In the music video of "Still Don't Care", Trainor was wearing a lavender corseted outfit while dancing with fans, walking outside of the Cheesecake Factory, riding the trolley, and leading a flash mob at the LA LA Land Cafe. The film also included a scene of Trainor performing in the Grove's fountain, which owner Rick Caruso noted made her "the only person in the history of The Grove to perform in the fountain". Clips of the shoot circulated widely on social media, with onlookers sharing footage of the flash mob and behind-the-scenes moments.

== Composition ==
"Still Don't Care" is a 1980s-influenced pop song that encourages listeners to embrace self-acceptance and confidence in the face of judgment or adversity. Serving as one of the defining tracks of Toy with Me (2026), Trainor described the song as "bold, fun, a little cheeky, and full of confidence", adding that it represents a reminder "to anyone who's ever felt judged". She noted that the track sets the tone for the Toy with Me era, characterized by her as her "most honest and fearless", and it focuses on themes of self-confidence, freedom, and authenticity. Her mother, brother and sister-in-law provided background vocals on the track.

Los 40's Juan Ignacio Herrero described the song as establishing the tone of Toy with Me's era through themes of self-assurance, personal growth, and prioritizing happiness over perfection.

== Charts ==
=== Weekly charts ===
Weekly chart performance
Chart (2025–2026)	Peak position
Canada CHR/Top 40 (Billboard)	24
Canada Hot AC (Billboard)	30
Estonia Airplay (TopHit)	33
Germany Airplay (BVMI)	51
Japan Hot Overseas (Billboard Japan)	16
Lithuania Airplay (TopHit)	15
US Adult Pop Airplay (Billboard)	12
US Pop Airplay (Billboard)	21

=== Monthly charts ===
Monthly chart performance
Chart (2025–2026)	Peak position
Estonia Airplay (TopHit)	37
Lithuania Airplay (TopHit)	16

== Release history ==
Release history and formats
Region	Date	Format(s)	Label	Ref.
United States	November 18, 2025	Contemporary hit radio	Epic	
