= 24/5 (song) =

2021 single by Mimi Webb

Single by Mimi Webb

from the EP Seven Shades of Heartbreak
- Released: 10 September 2021
- Length: 2:43
- Label: Epic
- Songwriter: Mimi Webb

Mimi Webb singles chronology
"Dumb Love" (2021)	"24/5" (2021)	"Halfway" (2021)

Music video
- "24/5" on YouTube

"24/5" is a song by British singer Mimi Webb, from her debut EP, Seven Shades of Heartbreak. It was released on 10 September 2021, through Epic Records. The song debuted at its peak of number 25 on the UK Singles Chart dated 17 September 2021.

== Charts ==
Chart performance for "24/5"
Chart (2021)	Peak position
Ireland (IRMA)	22
New Zealand Hot Singles (RMNZ)	25
Sweden Heatseeker (Sverigetopplistan)	4
UK Singles (OCC)	25
