= Red Flags (song) =

2023 single by Mimi Webb

Single by Mimi Webb

from the album Amelia
- Released: 13 January 2023
- Length: 2:24
- Label: Epic
- Songwriters: Mimi Webb; Henry Walter; Castle; Connor McDonough; Riley McDonough; Toby McDonough; Ryan Daly
- Producers: Cirkut; Connor McDonough; Ryan Daly

Mimi Webb singles chronology
"Ghost of You" (2022)	"Red Flags" (2023)	"Freezing" (2023)

Music video
- "Red Flags" on YouTube

"Red Flags" is a song by British singer Mimi Webb from her debut studio album Amelia. It was released on 13 January 2023 through Epic Records as the third single from the album. The song debuted at number 23 on the UK Singles Chart, later rising to a peak of number twelve.

== Production ==
The song was co-produced by Cirkut (real name Henry Walter), who had also worked with Webb on her previous single, "Ghost of You". Webb also revealed in an interview with the Official Charts Company that she "wrote [the song] with Connor McDonough, Riley McDonough, Toby McDonough, CASTLE, and Ryan Daly [Cirkut also helped produce and co-write the track]. We wrote it at the end of last summer. We did a lot of really sick songs that are on the album."

== Composition and lyrics ==
According to the Official Charts Company, the main theme of the song is "Mimi [beginning] to wonder why she's staying in a situation she should be well shot of" and seeing how "those red flags can actually seem a bit green".

Webb herself describes it as a "revenge song", saying "I was very in love, I think sometimes you want what you can't have. It can be really challenging and you have to have such a discipline to walk away. For me, I look back at our old conversations and, honestly, that person was really trying to get me to get break up with them. I didn't even see it! I thought it was all green flags."

== Live performances ==
Webb made several guest appearances on TV shows to promote the single, performing live on The Graham Norton Show on Friday 10 February 2023 She also appeared on The Late Show with Stephen Colbert to perform the song on 16 January 2023. Following the release of her album, Amelia, Webb featured in the "End of the Show Show" on Ant and Dec's Saturday Night Takeaway, aired live on Saturday 4 March 2023, performing '"Red Flags".

== Charts ==
=== Weekly charts ===
Weekly chart performance for "Red Flags"
Chart (2023)	Peak position
Canada CHR/Top 40 (Billboard)	42
Czech Republic Airplay (ČNS IFPI)	19
Hungary (Rádiós Top 40)	33
Ireland (IRMA)	12
Japan Hot Overseas (Billboard Japan)	14
New Zealand Hot Singles (RMNZ)	14
UK Singles (OCC)	12
US Adult Top 40 (Billboard)	31
US Mainstream Top 40 (Billboard)	28

=== Year-end charts ===
Year-end chart performance for "Red Flags"
Chart (2023)	Position
UK Singles (OCC)	88

== Certifications ==
Certifications for "Red Flags"
Region	Certification	Certified units/sales
United Kingdom (BPI)	Gold	400,000^{‡}
^{‡} Sales+streaming figures based on certification alone.
