= Good Without =

2021 single by Mimi Webb

Single by Mimi Webb

from the EP Seven Shades of Heartbreak
- Released: 26 March 2021
- Length: 3:03
- Label: Epic
- Songwriters: Mimi Webb; Fridolin Walcher; Sam Merrifield
- Producer: Freedo

Mimi Webb singles chronology
"Reasons" (2021)	"Good Without" (2021)	"Dumb Love" (2021)

Music video
- "Good Without" on YouTube

"Good Without" is a song by British singer Mimi Webb. It was released on 26 March 2021 through Epic Records as the first single from her debut EP, Seven Shades of Heartbreak.

''Good Without'' went viral on TikTok, going on to achieve almost 1 million streams two days after release. The song eventually peaked at number eight on UK Singles Chart, becoming her first top ten hit.

== Background ==
Webb made her breakthrough in 2021, off the back of her song "Before I Go" going viral after she sang the song acapella in a New York restaurant, in front of TikTok star Charli D'Amelio. In an interview with the BBC to mark Webb being named on the Sound of... list for 2022, she addressed the themes of the song. Asked whether "the lyric "I'm good without you" is all about moving on and building back your confidence", she said "It really is. It's not about that break-up from two months ago - but it's got that empowerment to it. And I went back to it when I was going through all that stuff, and it really helped me out. I was just so grateful that it was there''.

=== Live performances ===
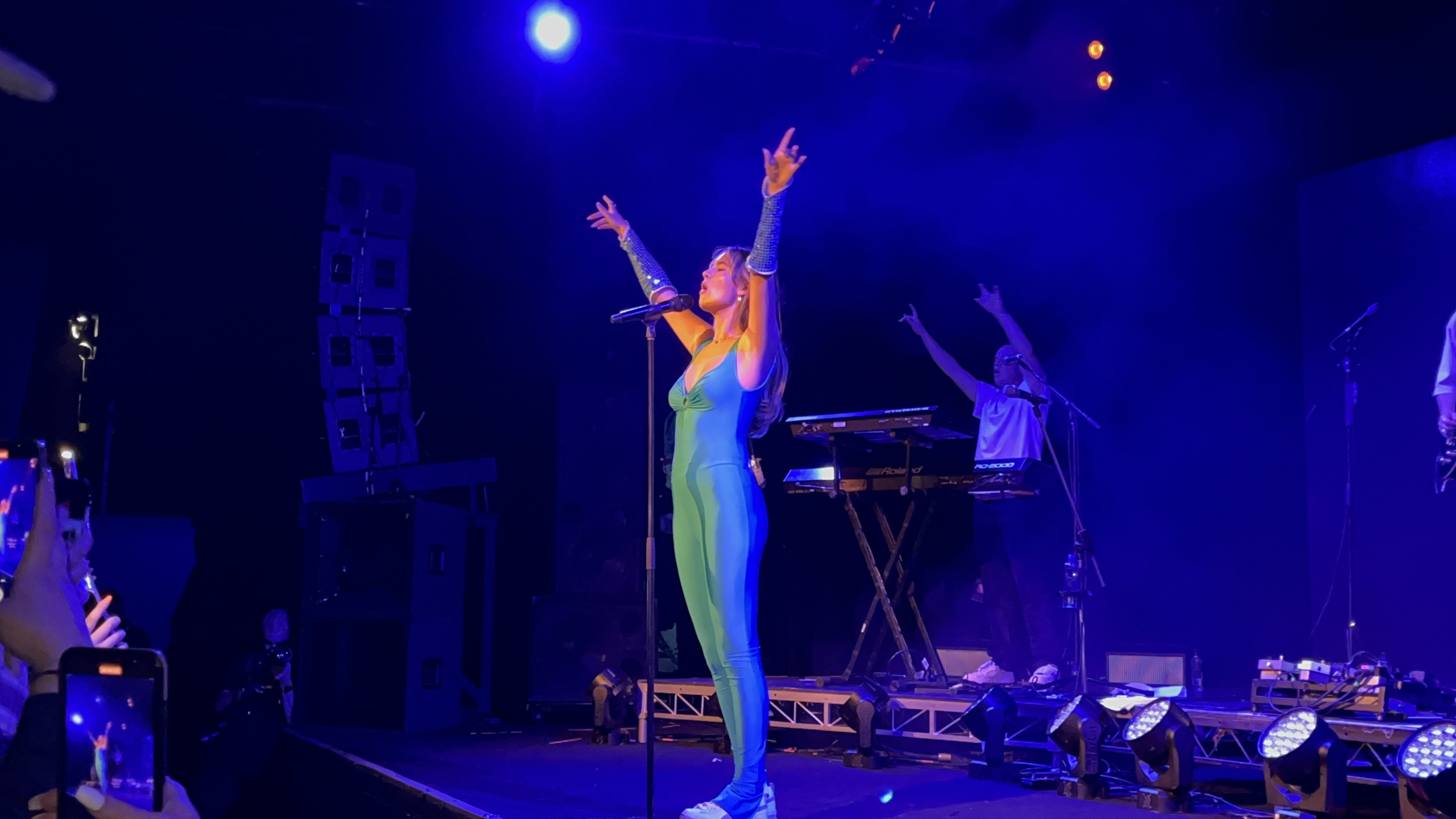
Webb performing the song in Sydney, Australia in September 2022.

She performed the song on the Top of the Pops Christmas special at the end of 2021. Prior to this Webb was on the lineup of the Capital Jingle Bell Ball, performing on Saturday 11 December alongside The Script, Becky Hill, Tom Grennan, Justin Bieber and Clean Bandit among others. She started 2022 by performing the hit song at the launch show for the Brit Awards.

== Critical reception ==
Wonderland magazine said Webb had "fashioned up a stirring pop tune" which is "penned over the heartbreak from a failed relationship gone seriously wrong". They also described it as a "catchy tune", with Webb "flipping the script as she turns life around and kicks negativity to the curb".

== Commercial performance ==
"Good Without" became Mimi Webb's second single to reach the top 100 on the UK Singles Chart after "Reasons". After debuting at number 17 a week after release, it hovered in the top 30 before reaching the top 10 for the first time in its ninth week on the chart. The song moved up to its peak position, number 8 on week ending 1 July 2021.

Outside her native country the song also made an impact on the charts, reaching number 7 in Ireland after a similar ascent up the rankings, number 34 in Norway and number 34 in the Netherlands. It also peaked at number 30 on the US Pop chart.

== Music video ==
The song's music video debuted almost a month after the song's release on 23 April 2021.

The website BroadwayWorld describes the video as "[beginning] with Mimi in her bedroom surrounded by her girlfriends. Soon, the post-breakup sorrow turns into ebullient energy. She tries on various outfits and undergoes a rejuvenating glam routine only to emerge more confident than ever alongside of her girl gang. The visual brings the lyrics to life as the chorus rings out, "I'm so good without.""

Mimi said about the video "It's very girl power. You're trying to get over it and move on, but you need your friends. It isn't all heartbreak. We gave it a twist. If you're in the middle of a breakup, no matter the stage, I want you to be able to relate. When your girls are behind you, you're going to be alright."

== Charts ==
=== Weekly charts ===
Weekly chart performance for "Good Without"
Chart (2021)	Peak position
Belgium (Ultratop 50 Flanders)	25
Hungary (Single Top 40)	40
Ireland (IRMA)	7
Netherlands (Dutch Top 40)	23
Netherlands (Single Top 100)	34
Norway (VG-lista)	30
Sweden (Sverigetopplistan)	94
Switzerland (Schweizer Hitparade)	89
UK Singles (Official Charts)	8
US Adult Top 40 (Billboard)	30
US Mainstream Top 40 (Billboard)	36

=== Year-end charts ===
2021 year-end chart performance for "Good Without"
Chart (2021)	Position
Belgium (Ultratop Flanders)	59
Ireland (IRMA)	39
UK Singles (OCC)	44

2022 year-end chart performance for "Good Without"
Chart (2022)	Position
Belgium (Ultratop 50 Flanders)	164

== Certifications ==
Certifications for "Good Without"
Region	Certification	Certified units/sales
Belgium (BRMA)	Gold	20,000^{‡}
Canada (Music Canada)	Gold	40,000^{‡}
Denmark (IFPI Danmark)	Gold	45,000^{‡}
Norway (IFPI Norway)	Platinum	60,000^{‡}
Switzerland (IFPI Switzerland)	Platinum	20,000^{‡}
United Kingdom (BPI)	Platinum	600,000^{‡}
Streaming
Sweden (GLF)	Gold	4,000,000^{†}
^{‡} Sales+streaming figures based on certification alone.^{†} Streaming-only figures based on certification alone.
