= Can't Dance (Meghan Trainor song) =

Single by Meghan Trainor
- Released: May 11, 2018
- Recorded: 2018
- Genre: Pop; dance
- Length: 3:00
- Label: Epic
- Songwriter(s): Meghan Trainor; Andrew Wells; Jacob Kasher Hindlin
- Producer(s): Andrew Wells

Meghan Trainor singles chronology
"Let You Be Right" (2018)	"Can't Dance" (2018)	"Just Got Paid" (2018)

"Can't Dance" (stylized in all caps) is a song by the American singer-songwriter Meghan Trainor. It was written by Trainor, Andrew Wells and Jacob Kasher Hindlin, and produced by Wells. "Can't Dance" was announced on May 8, 2018, along with its official single artwork the day after. Epic Records released it on May 11, 2018, a day after "Let You Be Right". Both songs were intended to be part of Trainor's third major-label studio album Treat Myself (2020), but did not make the final cut. Lyrically, the pop and dance song sees Trainor asking a shy male to join her on the dance floor.

At a Q&A in March 2018, Trainor revealed that a music video for the song was already filmed, and described it as her favorite music video she had done so far; it would have featured her dancing "a lot" and "amazing looks", although it was ultimately not released. Trainor opened the 2018 Radio Disney Music Awards with a medley of "Can't Dance", "No Excuses" (2018), "Let You Be Right" (2018), "Me Too" (2016) and "All About That Bass" (2014).

== Background ==
Trainor had been searching for a producer to create her upcoming third major-label studio album Treat Myself (2020) with, when she conducted the first session for it with songwriter Jacob Kasher Hindlin. He suggested that they work with then-unknown producer Andrew Wells. Trainor, who was expecting the session to go "really bad or really awesome", ended up writing the song "Let You Be Right" with them, and knew Wells "was the one". Wells produced the song, and ended up collaborating with Trainor on four songs for her second EP, The Love Train (2019), two of which were co-written by Hindlin.

Trainor revealed the song title at a Q&A in March 2018, stating that she did not know if it will be second single or third, but "knew it'd be a single one day". She further teased the song on her Instagram account on May 8, 2018, three days before the official release date. It was released on May 11, 2018, preceded by "Let You Be Right" a day earlier. The artwork was shot at the music video shoot for "Let You Be Right". About her decision to release two singles in the same week, Trainor said "My team and I talked about it, and I just can't wait any longer to share the songs on this album. I wanted to drop two today instead of one." MTV's Madeline Roth praised the release strategy by writing that "dropping dual singles is a smart move — fans decide which song they prefer and the label can run with it — so she appears to be in a sweet spot as she glides into her new era".

Trainor delayed the August 2018-scheduled release of Treat Myself to January 25, 2019, because she wanted to add more songs to it, though it was not released on that date either. She stated in a January 2020 interview that the album will be an attempt to make a pop record that feels relevant in an era when hip-hop reigns, adding that she had written four albums worth of material trying to adapt to new trends in the music industry. When Treat Myself was finally released on January 31, 2020, "Can't Dance" was scrapped from the final cut.

== Composition and reception ==
"Can't Dance" is a synth-driven song with a "shuffling" beat that lyrically displays Trainor's confidence in a "steamy" club setting. It features the singer dealing with a shy man who refuses to "let loose", and flirtatiously giving him "step-by-step instructions" about how to dance with her. The song offers a "once in a lifetime" offer to a shy male subject in the club, with Trainor singing "Even if you can't dance, just hold my hips." Idolator's Mike Wass praised the song, preferring it to "Let You Be Right". He added "It evokes the bouncy pop of the ’90s in a way that feels utterly sincere". Writing for Entertainment Tonight Canada, Corey Atad opined that the song brings "new bass-heavy beats" to Trainor's usual retro style, and called it "dance-y". It charted at number 64 on the Rádio Top 100 chart in Slovakia.

== Promotion ==
At a Q&A in March 2018, Trainor revealed that a music video for the song was already filmed. She described it as her favorite music video she had done so far, it will feature her dancing "a lot" and "amazing looks". The official music video was never released. Trainor opened the 2018 Radio Disney Music Awards with a medley of "Can't Dance", "No Excuses" (2018), "Let You Be Right" (2018), "Me Too" (2016) and "All About That Bass" (2014). She performed "Can't Dance" at the 2019 Los Angeles Pride event. Regarding the performance, she stated "My butt was out and about, and the only audience I would be comfortable showing off my body and my ass for is my LGBTQ community because they accept and love me for who I am".

== Personnel ==
Credits adapted from Tidal.

- Andrew Wells – producer, songwriter, engineer
- Meghan Trainor – lead vocals, songwriter
- Jacob Kasher – songwriter
- Bo Bodnar – engineer
- Matt Wolach – engineer
- Serban Ghenea – mixing engineer
- Randy Merrill – mastering engineer

== Charts ==
Chart (2018)	Peak position
Slovakia (Rádio Top 100)	64

== Release history ==
Region	Date	Format	Label	Ref.
Various	May 11, 2018	Digital download	Epic	
