= Make You Dance =

2020 single by Meghan Trainor

Single by Meghan Trainor

from the album Treat Myself (Deluxe)
- Released: July 10, 2020
- Genre: Dance-pop
- Length: 3:11
- Label: Epic
- Songwriters: Meghan Trainor; Andrew Wells; Anthony Rossomando; Grace Barker
- Producer: Asa Welch

Meghan Trainor singles chronology
"Nice to Meet Ya" (2020)	"Make You Dance" (2020)	"White Christmas" (2020)

Music video
- "Make You Dance" on YouTube

"Make You Dance" is a song by American singer-songwriter Meghan Trainor for her third major-label studio album Treat Myself (2020). The song was written by Trainor, Andrew Wells, Anthony Rossomando and Grace Barker, while production was handled by Asa Welch. It was released on July 10, 2020, as the lead single from the album's deluxe version and fourth in general through Epic Records.

Lyrically inspired by the ongoing COVID-19 pandemic, the dance-pop song has funky disco vibes, sees Trainor admit her negative habits, and encourages the listeners to dance. "Make You Dance" received praise from music critics for its chorus and spirited nature. A music video for the song was released on July 17, 2020. A Remix EP for it was released two days prior, including remixes of it by Lash, Digital People, and De'La.

== Background and release ==
Trainor had been searching for a producer to create her upcoming third major-label studio album Treat Myself (2020) with, when she conducted the first session for it with songwriter Jacob Kasher Hindlin. He suggested that they work with then-unknown producer Andrew Wells. Trainor, who was expecting the session to go "really bad or really awesome", ended up writing the song "Let You Be Right" with them, and knew Wells "was the one." Wells ended up collaborating with Trainor on four songs for her second EP, The Love Train (2019). Subsequently, the two co-wrote "Make You Dance" with Anthony Rossomando and Grace Barker, with production being handled by Asa Welch.

Epic Records released Treat Myself on January 31, 2020. In a June 2020 interview with iHeartRadio, Trainor stated that she was experiencing writer's block due to the public perception that she should be "creating [her] masterpiece" during the COVID-19 lockdowns. However, on July 8, 2020, she announced the song title "Make You Dance" alongside a promotional picture, followed by an official countdown and teasers of it on her Instagram Stories. The song was released for digital download and streaming as the lead single from the deluxe version of Treat Myself and fourth in general, through Epic two days later. The label released a Remix EP to promote the track on July 15, including remixes of it by Lash, Digital People, and De'La. The album's deluxe version was released two days later.

== Inspiration and composition ==
During the COVID-19 lockdowns, Trainor had to stay at home which made her feel "trapped in [her] brain and [her] thoughts." She turned to meditation and songwriting as ways to improve her mental health. Trainor wrote "Make You Dance" during the beginning of the quarantine. Shortly after the song's release, she revealed that it was inspired by her "insane addiction" to Chinese video-sharing social networking service TikTok as she "love[s] the songs that trend on there" and gets her new music from shazaming songs on the platform, in an interview with Brooke Reese via FaceTime on Apple Music.

"Make You Dance" has funky disco vibes and a bass drop. The song begins with a sparse harmony, followed by bass thumps during which Trainor sings the lyrics "I dropped this shit to make you, make you, dance." With lyrics inspired by the ongoing COVID-19 pandemic, Trainor admits the negative habits she has picked up since the resultant lockdowns began, including drinking at 1 and staying awake all night to watch videos on her phone. She also confesses to feeling lazy: "Lately I've been lazy, I've been drowning in my head." Idolator's Mike Wass described it as "fucks-free dance-pop with a massive chorus", and "a feel-good, quarantine banger of the highest caliber."

== Critical reception ==
From contemporary reviews, Radio.com's Maia Kedem wrote that "Make You Dance" has a "killer chorus", and "like all of Trainor's hits, [is] a bop and then some" that made Kedem dance and also the listeners. Megan Stone of ABC News Radio described the song as "ultra-relatable and spirited", noting that it would "serve as a resounding anthem for those feeling worn down" by the pandemic. Wass called it an "irresistible banger" that "lives up to its title", complimented the "razor-sharp" beats and "killer" chorus", and concluded that "all in all, it's another top-shelf bop from an album brimming with dance-pop delights." E! Online's Billy Nilles stated that with "Make You Dance", "Trainor has one thing on her mind. And that's making sure we're all grooving as the world continues to spin ever more out of control."

== Music video ==
Due to the COVID-19 pandemic, the music video for "Make You Dance" was shot at Trainor's residence while practicing social distancing. It was directed by Reggie, produced by Joy Hubbard, and choreographed by Charm La'Donna. Nicole Parks was the creative director, Neema Sadeghi was the director of photography, Jake Coury was the 1st AC, Sven Van Ostrand was the key grip/gaffer, Tessa Robeson was the production designer, Ozzy Vidiro and Arielle Zolezzi were assistant producers, Alison Christian did Trainor's make-up, Iggy Rosales did her hair, and Hayley Atkin styled her. Andrew Reisfeld edited the video, with Kinan Chabani and Abdullah Ghazal serving as colorists, and Ryan Zum Mallen as the VFX/beauty editor. It was uploaded to Trainor's YouTube channel on July 17, 2020, and is composed of close-up shots of her performing the song afront a sparkly backdrop. Wass was positive of the video, calling it "cute" and "supremely confident." He concluded that it is "a typically glamorous affair that finds our heroine twirling in front of a disco ball."

== Track listing ==
- Digital download / streaming
1. "Make You Dance" – 3:11
- Remix EP
1. "Make You Dance" (Lash Remix) – 2:45
2. "Make You Dance" (Digital People Remix) – 3:05
3. "Make You Dance" (De'La Remix) – 2:33
- Spotify single
1. "Make You Dance" – 3:11
2. "Nice to Meet Ya" (featuring Nicki Minaj) – 3:17

== Credits and personnel ==
Credits adapted from the album liner notes, Treat Myself (2020).

- Asa Welch – producer
- Meghan Trainor – lead vocals, background vocals
- Jon Yeston – all instruments
- Josh Deguzman – assistant engineer
- Justin Trainor – engineer
- Jon Castelli – mixing engineer
- Dale Becker – mastering engineer

== Release history ==
Region	Date	Format	Version	Label	Ref.
Various	July 10, 2020	Digital download; streaming	Original	Epic	
Various	July 15, 2020	Digital download; streaming	Remixes	Epic	
