= Can't Dance =

Can't Dance may refer to:

- "Can't Dance" (Lisa Stansfield song), 2013
- "Can't Dance" (Meghan Trainor song), 2018

== See also ==
- "I Can't Dance", a song
- We Can't Dance, an album
