= All the Ways =

Song by Meghan Trainor

Single by Meghan Trainor

from the EP The Love Train
- Released: February 11, 2019
- Genre: Pop
- Length: 2:55
- Label: Epic
- Songwriter(s): Meghan Trainor; Andrew Wells; Jacob Kasher Hindlin
- Producer(s): Andrew Wells

Meghan Trainor singles chronology
"Hey DJ" (2018)	"All the Ways" (2019)	"With You" (2019)

Music video
- "All the Ways" on YouTube

"All the Ways" is a song recorded by the American singer-songwriter Meghan Trainor. The song was released on June 21, 2018, as a promotional single for the initial intended release of Trainor's third studio album, Treat Myself, and later only appeared on its Target deluxe edition following the album's 2020 release. The song was serviced to hot adult contemporary radio as the lead single from Trainor's second extended play (EP), The Love Train, on February 11, 2019.

The song was written by Trainor, Jacob Kasher Hindlin and Andrew Wells, and produced by Wells. Billboard described it as fun and danceable, while Trainor stated that it was inspired by a conversation she had with her husband Daryl Sabara that always makes her smile.

"All the Ways" peaked at number 16 on the US Adult Pop Songs chart, spending 13 total weeks on it. Brian Petchers directed the music video for the song, which was released on February 15, 2019, and depicts Bailee Madison going on an outing with a date. The song was used in a 2018 Target marketing campaign.

== Background and release ==
Trainor had been searching for a producer to create her upcoming third major-label studio album Treat Myself with, when she conduced the first session for it with songwriter Jacob Kasher Hindlin. He suggested that they work with then-unknown producer Andrew Wells. Trainor, who was expecting the session to go "really bad or really awesome", ended up writing the song "Let You Be Right" with them, and knew Wells "was the one". The trio subsequently wrote "All the Ways", and Wells produced it. The latter ended up collaborating with Trainor on four songs for her second EP, The Love Train (2019), two of which were co-written by Hindlin.

Trainor uploaded a 20-second sample of the song to Twitter on June 19, 2018. It was digitally released as a promotional single two days later. "All the Ways" was used in a 2018 Target marketing campaign. She delayed the August 2018-scheduled release of Treat Myself to January 25, 2019, because she wanted to add more songs to it, though it was not released on that date either. In February 2019, Trainor announced the release of an EP called The Love Train, describing it as "something of an appetizer" to Treat Myself. Her reasoning was that her father told her there were "way too many love songs" on the album, which caused her to put them out as a separate project.

"All the Ways" was serviced to hot adult contemporary radio as the lead single from the EP on February 11. Trainor stated in a January 2020 interview that Treat Myself will be an attempt to make a pop record that feels relevant in an era when hip-hop reigns, adding that she had written four albums worth of material trying to adapt to new trends in the music industry. She decided to include it as the 16th track on the Target deluxe edition of Treat Myself (2020).

== Inspiration and reception ==
Trainor stated that the song was inspired by a conversation she had with her husband Daryl Sabara "that always makes [her] smile". She was sitting on a couch with him one day and asked him "do you love me?", to which he replied "yes", the singer said "tell me all the ways", to which Sabara responded "all the ways". The song was Trainor's attempt to use the line in a song and "make everyone get it". According to her, it has a "big chorus" which was inspired by the work of ABBA, a concept that she wanted to execute without making it sound cheesy, but rather timeless. "All the Ways", a perky pop song that runs for the duration of 2 minutes and 55 seconds, sees Trainor "laying down the law". Her vocals in the verses were described as "coos", with Mike Wass of Idolator adding that the singer playfully chides in the chorus: "If you love me, love me, love me like you say/Darling, tell me all the ways. Tell me all the ways".

Billboard's Rita Thompson described "All the Ways" as "melodic" and "upbeat", adding that its release ensured that "fans have another fun, danceable track to fall in love with before the LP drops". Wass stated that the song "feels like a throwback to a different time with its cute synths and pure-pop sensibility" but also fits the 2018 soundscape. Mike Nied of the same website described it as a "shimmery bop" and "loved-up, needy anthem". In the US, "All the Ways" debuted at number 40 on the Adult Pop Songs chart, reaching its peak of number 16 after 8 weeks and spending 13 total weeks on the chart.

== Music video ==
Brian Petchers directed the music video for "All the Ways", which stars American actress Bailee Madison. Madison has stated that she was a fan of Trainor since a long time. She would sing Trainor's song "Dear Future Husband" while looking in the mirror when she was 14 years old. About her excitement over starring in the video, Madison stated that "getting to be a part of this video is so special & getting to call you my friend is DA coolest thing". Trainor, who texted the actress to ask her to star in the visuals, has said "when we read the treatment for this adorable video, I knew she was the perfect person for the part". The clip was released on February 15, 2019, and depicts Madison going on an outing with a date.

The video commences with Madison receiving text messages from someone. This is followed by the actress going on a date with someone dressed in a teddy bear outfit. They go to a restaurant, walk on a bridge and read books. After they get into a fight, the person buys Madison flowers, following which she forgives them and they attend a party together.

== Credits and personnel ==
Credits adapted from the liner notes of The Love Train.

- Meghan Trainor – lead vocals, background vocals
- Andrew Wells – production, bass, engineer, guitar, programmer, synthesizer
- Bo Bodnar – engineer, background vocals
- Daryl Sabara – background vocals
- Kelli Trainor – background vocals
- Ryan Trainor – background vocals
- John Hanes – engineer
- Randy Merrill – mastering engineer
- Serban Ghenea – mixing engineer
- John Whitt, Jr. – synthesizer

== Charts ==
Chart (2019)	Peak position
US Adult Pop Airplay (Billboard)	16

== Release history ==
Region	Date	Format	Label	Ref.
Various	June 21, 2018	Digital download; streaming	Epic	
United States	February 11, 2019	Adult contemporary radio	Epic	
