= The Client (TV series) =

American legal thriller drama TV series

- Promotional poster
- Genre: Legal drama; Thriller
- Based on: Characters from The Client by John Grisham
- Developed by: Judith Paige Mitchell
- Starring: JoBeth Williams; John Heard; Polly Holliday; David Barry Gray; Ossie Davis
- Theme music composer: Stephen Graziano; Dino A. Moriana
- Country of origin: United States
- Original language: English
- No. of seasons: 1
- No. of episodes: 22

Production
- Executive producers: Judith Paige Mitchell; Mitchell Binder
- Cinematography: Lowell Peterson
- Editors: Robert L. Sinise; M. Edward Salier
- Running time: 60 minutes
- Production companies: Michael Filerman Productions; Judith Paige Mitchell Productions; Regency Enterprises; Warner Bros. Television

Original release
- Network: CBS
- Release: September 17, 1995 – April 16, 1996

The Client (also referred to as John Grisham's The Client) is an American legal thriller drama television series developed by Judith Paige Mitchell that aired on CBS for one season, premiering with a two-hour pilot on September 17, 1995, and airing new episodes through April 16, 1996. The series was based on the 1994 film The Client, itself adapted from the 1993 John Grisham novel. It stars JoBeth Williams, John Heard, and Polly Holliday in the roles created in the film by Susan Sarandon, Tommy Lee Jones, and Micole Mercurio, respectively.

== Cast ==
=== Main ===
- JoBeth Williams as Reggie Love
- John Heard as Roy Foltrigg
- Polly Holliday as Momma Love
- David Barry Gray as Clint McGuire
- Ossie Davis as Judge Harry Roosevelt

=== Recurring ===
- Valerie Mahaffey as Ellie Foltrigg
- David Michael Mullins as Lewis Maddox
- Burke Moses as Jackson Love
- William Converse-Roberts as Dr. Gus Cardoni
- Derek McGrath as Arnie
- Thom Barry as Judge Waite-Barkley
- Brixton Karnes as Officer Brill

=== Guests ===
- Mac Davis as Waldo Gaines
- Harry Lennix as Daniel Holbrook
- Emilio Borelli as Nick
- Allen Williams as Howard Straithe
- Timothy Carhart as Walon Clark
- Emmanuelle Bach as Nicole
- Ray McKinnon as Lenny Barlow

== Episodes ==
No.	Title	Directed by	Written by	Original release date	Prod. code
1	"Pilot"	Paul Shapiro	Judith Paige Mitchell	September 17, 1995	457901
2	"Pilot"	Paul Shapiro	Judith Paige Mitchell	September 17, 1995	457902
3	"A Perfect World"	Steven Robman	Judith Paige Mitchell	September 19, 1995	457903
4	"Them That Has..."	Peter Levin	Robert Nathan	September 26, 1995	457904
5	"The Peach Orchard"	James Quinn	Joe Cacaci and Judith Paige Mitchell & Grace McKeaney	October 10, 1995	457905
6	"Drive, He Said"	Steven Robman	Grace McKeaney	October 17, 1995	457906
7	"The Burning of Atlanta"	James Frawley	Emily Skopov & Eddie Richey	October 24, 1995	457907
8	"Dear Harris"	Helaine Head	Judith Paige Mitchell & Grace McKeaney	October 31, 1995	457908
9	"The Prodigal Father"	James Hayman	Randy Anderson	November 7, 1995	457909
10	"Child's Play"	Dan Attias	Grace McKeaney	November 14, 1995	457910
11	"Happily Ever After"	Steve Dubin	Judith Paige Mitchell	November 21, 1995	457911
12	"The Way Things Never Were"	James Quinn	Gay Walch	December 19, 1995	457912
13	"Sympathy for the Devil"	Vern Gillum	Grace McKeaney	January 9, 1996	457913
14	"Motherless Child"	Win Phelps	Randy Anderson	January 11, 1996	457914
15	"Private Lives"	Helaine Head	Edward Tivnan	January 16, 1996	457915
16	"Winning"	Michael W. Watkins	Gary Johnson	January 30, 1996	457916
17	"The Morning After"	Vern Gillum	Story by : Grace McKeaney & Mitchell Binder; Teleplay by : Grace McKeaney	February 6, 1996	457917
18	"Damn Yankees"	Win Phelps	Gary Johnson	March 19, 1996	457918
19	"The High Ground"	Michael W. Watkins	Brad Markowitz	March 26, 1996	457919
20	"Past Imperfect"	Michael Pavone	Judith Paige Mitchell	April 2, 1996	457920
21	"The Good Samaritan"	Sharron Miller	Brad Markowitz	April 9, 1996	457921
22	"Money Talks"	Michael Pavone	Gary Johnson & Edward Tivnan	April 16, 1996	457922

== Ratings ==
The Client averaged at 7.9 million viewers, ranking at #22 for the network and #82 overall.

== Syndication and home media ==
The TNT Network rebroadcast the series five nights a week, March 1999 through February 2001.

While the full series is not available on DVD or Blu-ray, the 1995 pilot episode of the series was included as a bonus feature on the 2013 Blu-ray release of the 1994 film.
