= With You (Kaskade and Meghan Trainor song) =

2019 electropop single by American performers Kaskade and Meghan Trainor

Single by Kaskade and Meghan Trainor
- Released: June 14, 2019
- Genre: Electropop
- Length: 3:00
- Label: Columbia; Epic
- Songwriters: Finn Bjarnson; Richard Beynon; Robert Gerongco; Ryan Raddon; Samuel Gerongco; Terence Lam; Sarah Aarons; Thomas Shaw; Meghan Trainor
- Producers: Kaskade; Finn Bjarnson; Bynon; Thomas Shaw

Kaskade singles chronology
"Go Slow" (2019)	"With You" (2019)	"No One Else" (2019)

Meghan Trainor singles chronology
"All the Ways" (2019)	"With You" (2019)	"Wave" (2019)

Music video
- "With You" on YouTube

"With You" is a song by American DJ Kaskade and singer-songwriter Meghan Trainor. Kaskade and Trainor co-wrote the track with Robert Gerongco, Samuel Gerongco, Terence Lam, Sarah Aarons, Finn Bjarnson, Richard Beynon, and Thomas Shaw, while Kaskade co-produced it with the latter three. Released as a single on June 14, 2019, through Columbia Records, the song is an electropop track. The lyrics talk about emotional conflict and Trainor's partner sending her mixed signals when she could be using her time better.

"With You" received positive reviews from music critics, who generally complimented its upbeat and catchy composition. Commercially, the song reached number 15 on the China Airplay/Foreign Language chart and number 7 on the Venezuela Top Anglo chart, additionally managing to enter some component charts in the US. An animated video was released for it, as well as an official music video. "With You" was additionally promoted with a live performance on Today, and a Remix EP, featuring remixes of it by LöKii, Loris Cimino, and Dexter, as well as a Club Mix by Kaskade.

== Background and release ==
Kaskade released several collaborations with other artists in 2019, namely Cecilia Gault, Cheat Codes, Gorgon City, and Roméo. Him and Trainor co-wrote "With You" with Robert Gerongco, Samuel Gerongco, Terence Lam, Sarah Aarons, Finn Bjarnson, Richard Beynon, and Thomas Shaw, while Kaskade co-produced it with the latter three. Kaskade enlisted Trainor as a collaborator on the track, saying that "when the opportunity came to work with her it was an easy yes for me". He continued, stating that he knew they "could put something together that would be fun, meaningful and above all, sticky enough that people can't help but sing it after one listen". Trainor stated that "it was a dream come true", describing the song as her "first DJ bop" and resolving that she "want[s] the world to enjoy it and play it all summer long".

Kaskade announced the collaboration in a post to social media on June 10, 2019, while a snippet of the song was previewed a few days later. Columbia Records released it for digital download and streaming as a single on June 14 of that year. "With You" was serviced to contemporary hit radio as a single in Italy on June 28, and the United States on July 9, 2019, by Sony Music and Epic Records, respectively. Epic also sent the song to hot adult contemporary radio as a single in the US on August 5, 2019. Columbia released a Remix EP to promote it on September 12, 2019, including remixes of it by LöKii, Loris Cimino, and Dexter, as well as a Club Mix by Kaskade.

== Composition and lyrics ==
"With You" has a composition of mid-tempo electronic dance music beats, with lyrics about emotional conflict and Trainor's partner delivering mixed signals to her when she could be using her time better. Idolator's Mike Wass wrote that the electropop song finds Trainor "in a typically feisty mood as she lays down the law to a no-good boyfriend", adding that "by the time we reach the chorus, Meghan has had enough". Bella Bagshaw of Dancing Astronaut opined that "Kaskade kicks his digestibility up a notch on" it and that "the track's ricocheting synth line and fluttering, pitched-up vocal chops ensconce the track like celebratory glitter".

== Reception ==
Radio.com's Tiana Timmerberg praised "With You" as "upbeat, dancey, and honest", calling it "the soundtrack to all your upcoming parties". She further added that the song is an "upbeat jam" on which Trainor's "silvery" vocal performance shines, and her and Kaskade's "chemistry and firm grasp on creating the most contagiously catchy melodies" becomes clear. Writing for Your EDM, Karlie Powell called it "dynamic" and "pop-friendly", adding that it "sounds like a dream" and she "can totally hear [it] playing over the radio or through a music festival's sound system". Katie Stone of EDM.com complimented the lyrics of "With You" as "empowering" and its beat as "infectious", concluding that the song is a "summer anthem" that "[the listener] will want to chant all summer long". Wass dubbed the song a "catchy collaboration" and "feisty floorfiller", and added that it sees Trainor "reinvent herself as a club queen" and "sounds like a hit".

"With You" reached number 15 on the Billboard China Airplay/Foreign Language chart. In the US, the song peaked at number 22 on the Adult Top 40 chart. It further peaked at numbers 12 and 31 on the Hot Dance/Electronic Songs and Mainstream Top 40 charts, respectively. The song ranked at number 46 on the year-end US Hot Dance/Electronic Songs chart for 2019, while additionally charted at number 7 on the weekly Venezuela Top Anglo chart.

== Music videos and promotion ==
An accompanying animated video was released on July 8, 2019. The visual sees Trainor and Kaskade explore a psychedelic outer space and the video commences with a woman controlling a spaceship that she crashes on rocky terrain, which is populated by three-eyed cats. The former two have mystical superpowers and Trainor is able to cast rainbows from her eyes that grow trees, flowers and streams on the barren planet. Kat Bein of Billboard described the music video as "a psychedelic trip through the single's bouncy synth rhythm", and the pair's characters as "colorful, extraterrestrial super friends" and "alien superheroes". Entertainment Tonight Canada's Aynslee Darmon called it a "technicolor dream".

Directed by Romeo Salazar and choreographed by Charm La'Donna, the music video for "With You" was released on August 15, 2019. Wass described the visuals for it as "striking" and "seriously fierce", adding that Trainor "serv[ed] slinky choreography and sexy looks" in the video. Darmon wrote that Trainor looked like a "bejewelled goddess", stating that she was "blinged out and dancing around to the catchy tune". On September 13, 2019, Kaskade and Trainor performed "With You" on Today for further promotion.

== Track listing ==
- Digital download
1. "With You" – 3:00
- Remix EP
1. "With You" (LöKii Remix) – 3:51
2. "With You" (Loris Cimino Remix) – 2:27
3. "With You" (Dexter Remix) – 3:16
4. "With You" (Kaskade Club Mix) – 3:13

== Credits and personnel ==
Credits adapted from Tidal.

- Ryan Raddon – lead vocals, producer, engineer, recording engineer
- Meghan Trainor – lead vocals
- Finn Bjarnson – producer, engineer, recording engineer
- Richard Beynon – producer, engineer, recording engineer
- Thomas Shaw – producer, engineer, recording engineer
- Colin Leonard – mastering engineer
- Miles Walker – mixing engineer

== Charts ==
=== Weekly charts ===
Weekly chart positions for "With You"
Chart (2019)	Peak position
China Airplay/FL (Billboard)	15
US Adult Pop Airplay (Billboard)	22
US Hot Dance/Electronic Songs (Billboard)	12
US Pop Airplay (Billboard)	31
Venezuela Top Anglo (Record Report)	7

=== Year-end charts ===
Year-end chart position for "With You"
Chart (2019)	Position
US Hot Dance/Electronic Songs (Billboard)	46

== Release history ==
Release dates and format(s) for "With You"
Region	Date	Format(s)	Version	Label	Ref.
Various	June 14, 2019	Digital download; streaming	Original	Columbia	
Italy	June 28, 2019	Contemporary hit radio	Original	Sony	
United States	July 9, 2019	Contemporary hit radio	Original	Epic	
United States	August 5, 2019	Hot adult contemporary	Original	Epic	
Various	September 12, 2019	Digital download; streaming	Remix EP	Columbia	
