= Wave (Meghan Trainor song) =

Single by Meghan Trainor featuring Mike Sabath

from the album Treat Myself
- Released: September 27, 2019
- Recorded: March 5, 2019
- Genre: Electropop; house
- Length: 2:56
- Label: Epic
- Songwriter(s): Meghan Trainor; Mike Sabath
- Producer(s): Mike Sabath; Meghan Trainor

Meghan Trainor singles chronology
"With You" (2019)	"Wave" (2019)	"Nice to Meet Ya" (2020)

Music video
- "Wave" on YouTube

"Wave" is a song by the American singer-songwriter Meghan Trainor, featuring the producer Mike Sabath, from her third major-label studio album Treat Myself (2020). The track, which was written and produced by the duo, was released on September 27, 2019, as the second single from the album. Backed by panoramic piano and ostentatious background vocals, the electropop and house song lyrically tells the story of the emotional fallout of a failed relationship.

The song received mixed reviews from critics, with some of them praising the lyrics as mature and anthemic, while others were critical of its production. Commercially, it charted at number 35 on the New Zealand Hot Singles chart. Mathew Cullen directed the music video for "Wave", which features an earthy color palette and Trainor dancing atop a group of people that rock around her like waves. Trainor performed the song on The Ellen DeGeneres Show and The Voice and included it on the set list of her 2024 concert tour, the Timeless Tour.

== Background and release ==
Trainor delayed her third major-label studio album, Treat Myself, from August 2018 to January 25, 2019, because she wanted to add more songs to it, and removed it from iTunes that month. Trainor had written "Wave" in 2016, and held onto it until 2019. She approached Mike Sabath to produce the song. As the two became close while working on it in the studio, Trainor asked him to record a verse for the song. Sabath stated that he was "super inspired" by her voice and the energy of the people in the studio, and finished his verse in one take and filled in the lyrics, concluding the recording of the song on March 5, 2019. Sabath went on to produce five of the fifteen tracks from the album, co-writing four of them.

About the inspiration for "Wave", Trainor said that "there was this guy that was -- this poor dude, I'm probably talkin' 'bout him everywhere. But he was like, 'We can't ever be together 'cause it won't last!' But he'd be like, 'I love you' and I was like 'Ok, why are you calling then? Like why is this a thing?' So I don't know how to express myself with words, so I wrote this song and I sent it to him". She has stated that she has "never worked harder on a song" and that Sabath took it to a whole new level.

Trainor announced the release date along with the single artwork for "Wave" on September 25, 2019. The song was digitally released two days later, as the second single from Treat Myself. On October 7, 2019, a solo version of it was serviced to hot adult contemporary radio stations in the United States. A Remix EP to promote "Wave" was released on November 22, 2019, featuring remixes of the song by R3hab, Justin Caruso and Arkadi.

== Composition ==
"Wave" is two minutes and fifty-six seconds long. Sabath produced the song with Trainor and engineered it with John Hanes. He plays drums, bass, and synthesizer, and Trainor plays synthesizer. Jordan Federman, Daryl Sabara, Camila Viola, Trainor and her brother Ryan provide background vocals. Serban Ghenea mixed the song, and Randy Merrill mastered it.

"Wave"
"Wave" is an electropop and house song with an electronic dance music pulse and background vocals with gospel-inflected harmonies.

An electropop and house song, According to Dani Blum of Pitchfork, "Wave" begins with Trainor delivering "titanic vocals over a panoramic piano" instrumentation, which transitions into an electronic dance music pulse that was compared to the work of Cascada. The song features "ostentatious" background vocals with gospel-inflected harmonies that she stated were inspired by her visits to Kanye West's Sunday Service Choir shows.

Described as a "frothy electro-bop", its lyrics detail the highs and lows of a dramatic love story. "Wave" talks about the emotional fallout of a relationship that has failed, with lyrics like "And I shouldn't beg for more/But I don't want it to end". It has been called a drastic departure from Trainor's traditional doo-wop sound by PopMatters' Jessica Brant.

== Critical reception ==
The song received mixed reviews from music critics. Idolator's Mike Nied wrote that "Wave" finds "the duo [riding] the waves of their love story", adding that "the end result feels more mature and graceful than some of Meghan's more saccharine bops" and that he loved the creative direction. Nied stated that it may very well be Trainor's best song yet, and is the "sort of mature anthem that could very easily take her career to another level". Heran Mamo of Billboard opined that "the backing choir adds an ethereal layer over the electronic impressions" on "Wave", and that "the chorus is a powerfully sweeping recital that emphasizes just how overwhelming her desire to get this love back is". Writing for Entertainment Tonight Canada, Corey Atad described it as "anthemic and danceable". In a negative review, Hannah Mylrea of NME stated that the song "starts slow before erupting into a tacky house mess that would sound at home soundtracking Love Island. Pitchfork's Dani Blum called it "a Cascada remix for a middle school dance in a sweaty gym".

== Promotion ==
=== Music video ===
Directed by Mathew Cullen and choreographed by Charm La'Donna, the music video for "Wave" was released on October 7, 2019. It features an earthy color palette and depicts Trainor in an abstract dance party where she glides above the hands of several people. Trainor, who is dressed in a nude-colored leotard, dances atop a group of people that rock back and forth. They catch and release her body in rhythm with quivering synths, so as to simulate a human wave. The dancers are dressed in neutral tones and form a giant pyramid shape. The dancers crash like waves around Trainor, as if she were a rock in the water. Sabath joins in later, donning a leopard print headband.

The music video received positive reviews from critics. Rolling Stone's Claire Shaffer wrote that the abstract dance party in the video "transform[s] into an almost spiritual experience for Trainor". Writing for MTV News, Madeline Roth described the choreography as "pristine", adding that the singer looked "absolutely ethereal in a tulle gown". Jessica Brant of PopMatters was positive of the video, stating that the dance moves were executed with "short, military precision" and elaborated that the visuals see Trainor "evocatively stage a physical representation of the enduring power of a shipwrecked romance shared between two partners".

=== Live performances ===
Trainor and Sabath performed "Wave" for the first time, on The Ellen DeGeneres Show, on November 6, 2019. They also performed the song at The Voice on December 3, 2019. Trainor performed a stripped-back version of it during her Billboard Live At-Home concert on April 10, 2020, which aimed to raise money for Feeding America. She included "Wave" on the set list of her 2024 concert tour, the Timeless Tour.

== Track listing ==
- Digital download
1. "Wave" (featuring Mike Sabath) – 2:56
- Remix EP
1. "Wave" (featuring Mike Sabath) (R3hab Remix) – 3:13
2. "Wave" (featuring Mike Sabath) (Justin Caruso Remix) – 4:04
3. "Wave" (featuring Mike Sabath) (Arkadi Remix) – 3:35

== Credits and personnel ==
Credits are adapted from the liner notes of Treat Myself.

- Mike Sabath – producer, songwriter, featured vocals, bass, drums, recording engineer, synthesizer
- Meghan Trainor – producer, songwriter, lead vocals, background vocals, synthesizer
- Camila Viola – background vocals
- Daryl Sabara – background vocals
- Jordan Federman – background vocals
- Ryan Trainor – background vocals
- Serban Ghenea – mixing engineer
- Randy Merrill – mastering engineer

== Charts ==
Chart positions for "Wave"
Chart (2019)	Peak position
New Zealand Hot Singles (RMNZ)	35
US Adult Pop Airplay (Billboard)	44

== Release history ==
Release dates and format(s) for "Wave"
Region	Date	Format(s)	Version	Label	Ref.
Various	September 27, 2019	Digital download; streaming	Original	Epic	
United States	October 7, 2019	Hot adult contemporary	Solo	Epic	
Various	November 22, 2019	Digital download; streaming	Remixes	Epic	
