= Moonlight Rollerway =

Roller rink in Glendale, California (1950–present)

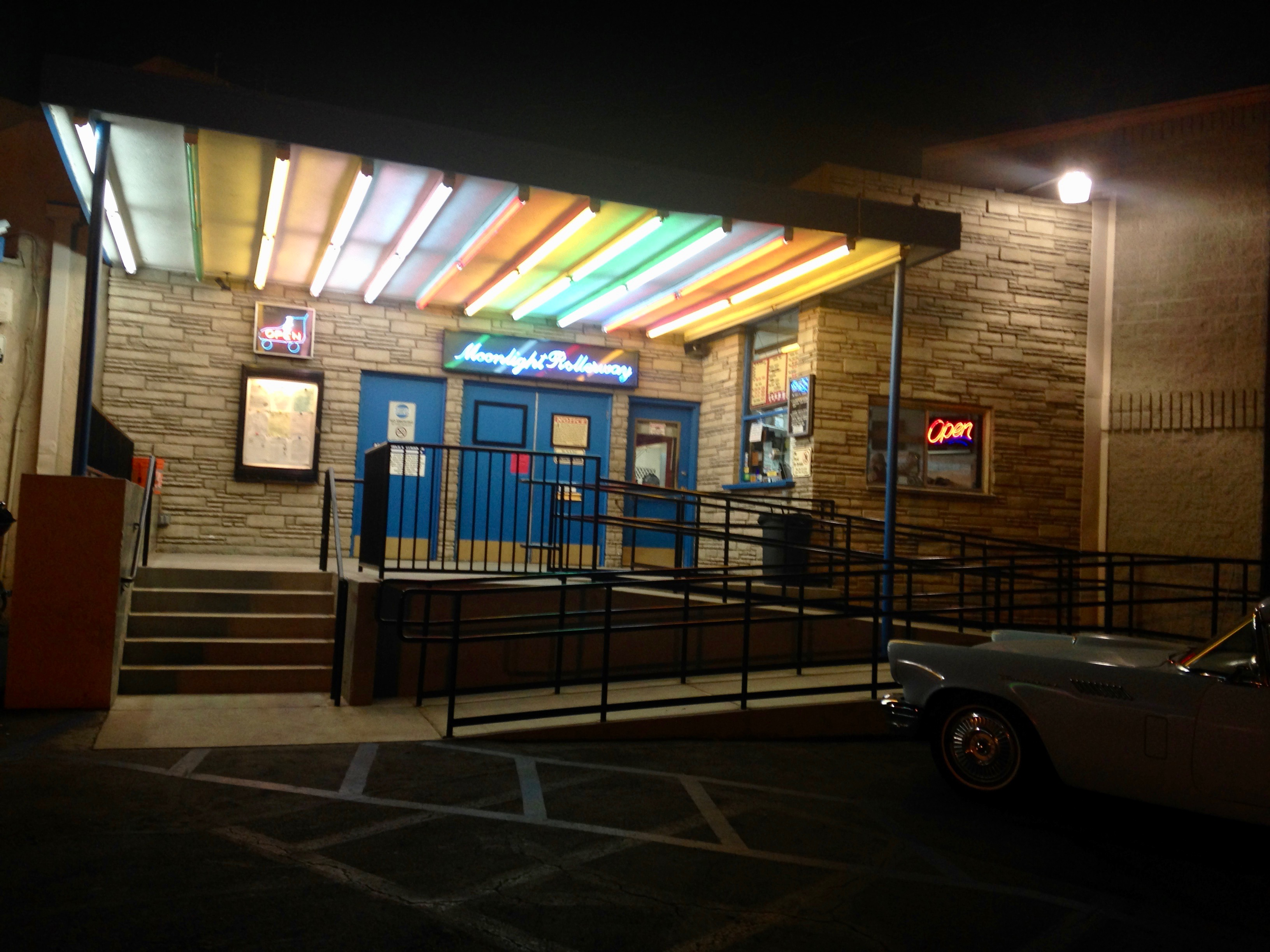
Entrance to the rollerway

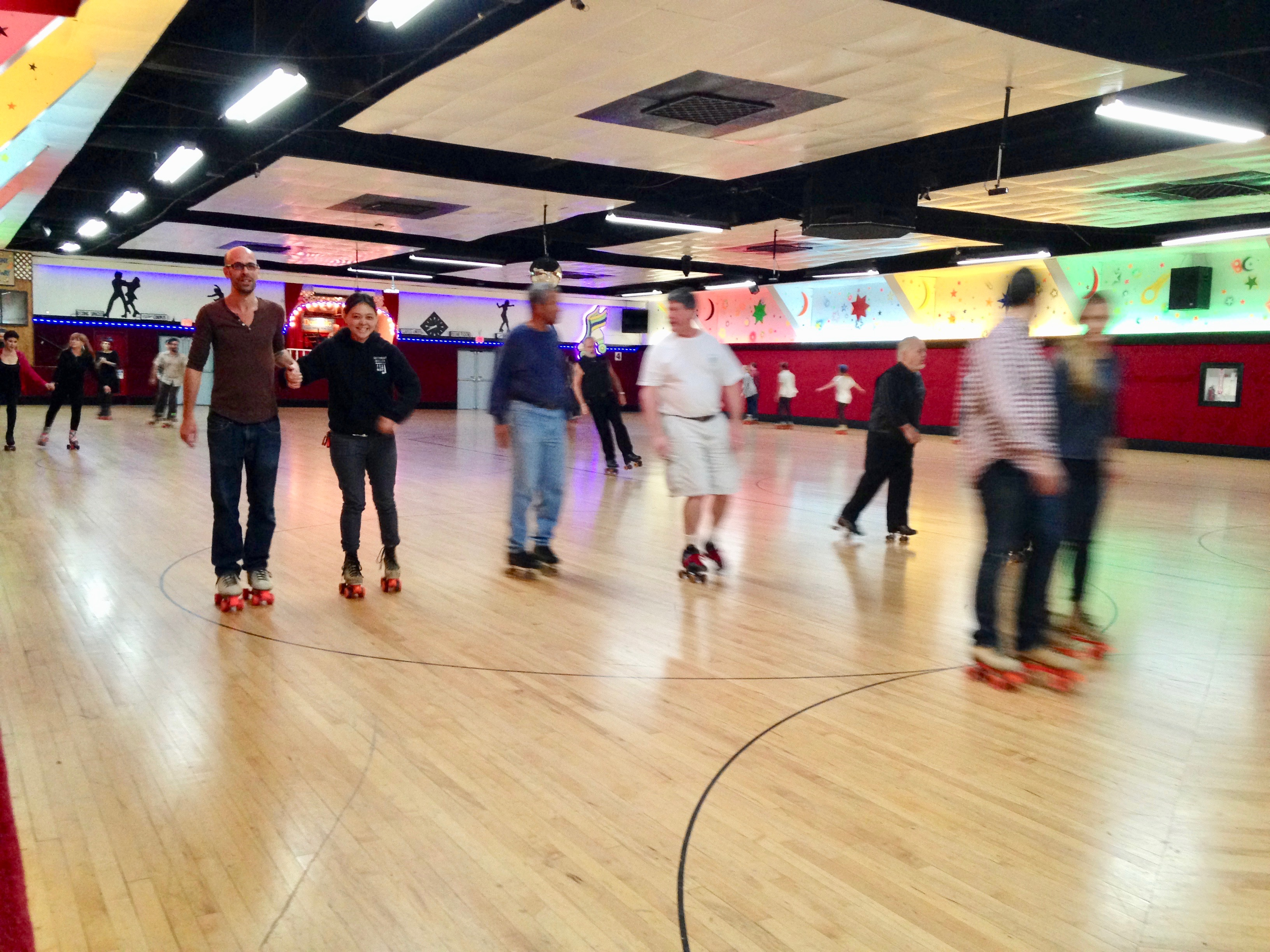
Inside the roller rink

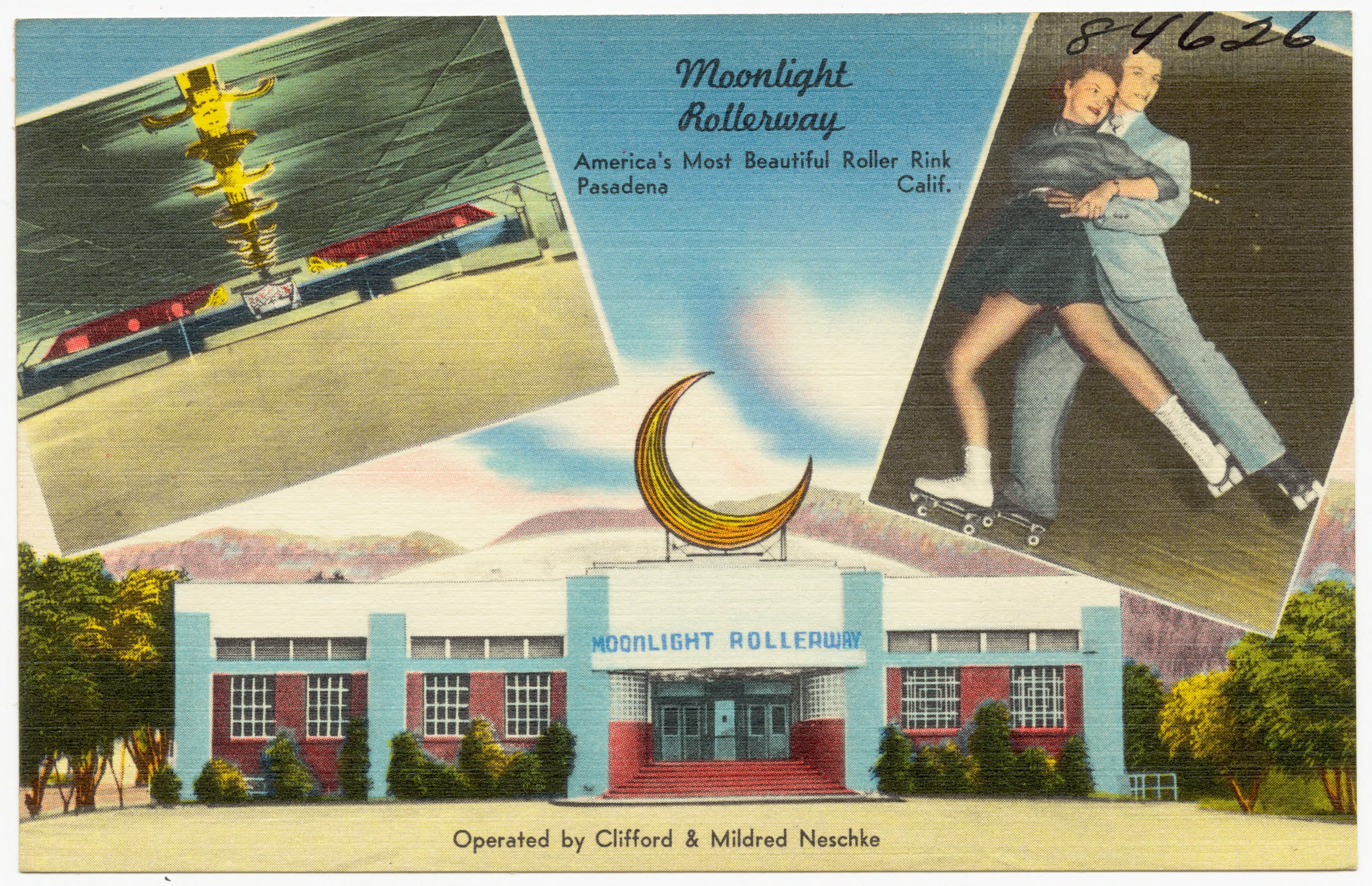
Moonlight Rollerway in Pasadena, California

Moonlight Rollerway is a historic roller skating rink located at 5110 San Fernando Road in Glendale, California. It was formerly known as Harry's Roller Rink.

== History ==
Before the building became a skating rink, it was a foundry that created airplane parts. It was erected in 1942. It officially became Harry's Roller Rink in 1950 when Harry Dickerman purchased the space. It remained under the Harry's moniker until 1968, when it was purchased by the owners of Moonlight Rollerway in Pasadena, Cliff and Mildred Neschke. Dominic Cangelosi, organist for the original Moonlight Rollerway in Pasadena and later, organist at the Glendale branch, purchased the rink in 1985.

Since 1986, the rink has hosted a weekly "Rainbow Skate" roller skating event for the LGBT+ community.

== Film ==
Moonlight Rollerway has been used as a filming location for movies, television, and music videos.

- Switchblade Sisters (1975)
- The Buddy Holly Story (1978)
- Roller Boogie (1979)
- Barnaby Jones, episode: "The Killin' Cousin" (1980)
- Lies of the Heart: The Story of Laurie Kellogg (1994)
- "A Public Affair" (2006) music video for Jessica Simpson
- Gene Simmons Family Jewels, episode: "Coming Out Party" (2007)
- Cold Case, episode: "Roller Girl" (2008)
- Glee, episode: "Home" (2010)
- Beginners (2011)
- Lovelace (2013)
- Modern Family, episode: My Hero (2013)
- The Goldbergs, episode: "Daddy Daughter Day" (2013)
- "Let You Be Right" (2014) music video for Meghan Trainor
- The Toy Soldiers (2014)
- Hell's Kitchen, episode: "11 Chefs Compete" (2015)
- Straight Outta Compton, (2015)
- GLOW, episode: "Maybe It's All the Disco" (2017)
- The Good Life (2017)
- "Cycles" (2018) music video for Tove Lo
- Single Parents, episode: "A Place Where Men Can Be Men" (2019)
- American Horror Story, episode: "The Lady in White" (2019)
- Bliss (2021)
- It's Always Sunny In Philadelphia, episode: "The Gang Buys a Roller Rink" (2021)
- Pivoting, episode: "Hell on Wheels" (2022)
- Euphoria
