= Judith Paige Mitchell =

American novelist

Judith Paige Segel
- Born: November 24, 1932; New Orleans, Louisiana, U.S.
- Died: February 10, 2010 (aged 77); Los Angeles, California, U.S.
- Writing career
- Pen name: Paige Mitchell
- Notable work: The Client (1995–96)

Judith Paige Mitchell (November 24, 1932 – February 10, 2010) was a television writer, executive producer and novelist.

== Biography ==
Judith Paige Segel was born in New Orleans. Her parents were George Jacob Segel (1906–1993) and Esther (née Finerosky) (1908–1995). She started her career as a novelist, her subjects including integration and civil rights. She moved to Los Angeles in 1965 after divorcing her first husband Alvin Binder, a civil rights attorney in Jackson, Mississippi, and also worked in television as a writer and producer, with many topics focused on true crime. Mitchell died of cancer in Los Angeles on February 10, 2010, survived by her husband and well-known Los Angeles publisher Jeremy Tarcher and three children.

== Literary credits ==
- A Wilderness of Monkeys (1965)
- Love is Not a Safe Country (1968)
- The Mayfly (1971)
- The Covenant, a Novel (1973)
- Act of Love (1976) (adapted into 1980 television movie of the same name)
- Wild Seed (1982)

== Teleplay credits ==
- Desperate for Love (1989)
- Lies of the Heart: The Story of Laurie Kellogg (1994)
- Young at Heart (1995 TV movie) (1995)
- Glory, Glory (1998)
