= Evil Twin (song) =

2019 song by Meghan Trainor

Promotional single by Meghan Trainor

from the album Treat Myself
- Released: December 13, 2019
- Recorded: 2017
- Genre: Electropop
- Length: 3:12
- Songwriter(s): Meghan Trainor; Joshua Kear; Ethan Snoreck; Tyler Johnson
- Producer(s): Tyler Johnson; Andrew Wells

"Evil Twin" is a song recorded by American singer-songwriter Meghan Trainor for her third major-label studio album Treat Myself (2020). It was written by Trainor, Joshua Kear, Ethan Snoreck and Tyler Johnson, and produced by Johnson and Andrew Wells. The track was released on December 13, 2019, as the third promotional single from the album. Backed by electropop production, the '60s-inspired song has lyrics about the wild side of Trainor, that makes bad decisions on her part. "Evil Twin" received critical acclaim upon release, with some critics highlighting it as a standout track on Treat Myself and praising its bold lyrics and disco-influenced production.

== Background ==
On February 7, 2018, Meghan Trainor tweeted that her new favorite song on her upcoming third major-label studio album was "Evil Twin". The next day, she described the track in an interview with Entertainment Tonight by saying "why did I say that? That is my evil twin, that wasn't me! I am innocent!" According to her, it is about "all those things [people] think about to [themselves]", and everyone has an "evil twin" in them. Trainor delayed the August 2018-scheduled album, Treat Myself, to January 25, 2019, because she wanted to add more songs to it, though it was not released on that date either.

She confirmed the upcoming release of "Evil Twin", on Twitter, on December 9, 2019. Trainor revealed the single artwork and wrote, "You've waited long enough.. #EVILTWIN comes out Friday 😎 listen for my entire family on the backgrounds!" The song was released as a promotional single on December 13. The artwork features side-by-side photographs of Trainor. Billboard described them as "fierce" and "terrified", and ABC News Radio called them "sassy" and "scared".

Trainor stated in a January 2020 interview that Treat Myself will be an attempt to make a pop record that feels relevant in an era when hip-hop reigns, adding that she had written four albums worth of material trying to adapt to new trends in the music industry. On January 22, she unveiled the tracklist for the album, which included "Evil Twin" as the 11th track on it. Thus, it made the final cut for Treat Myself.

== Composition ==
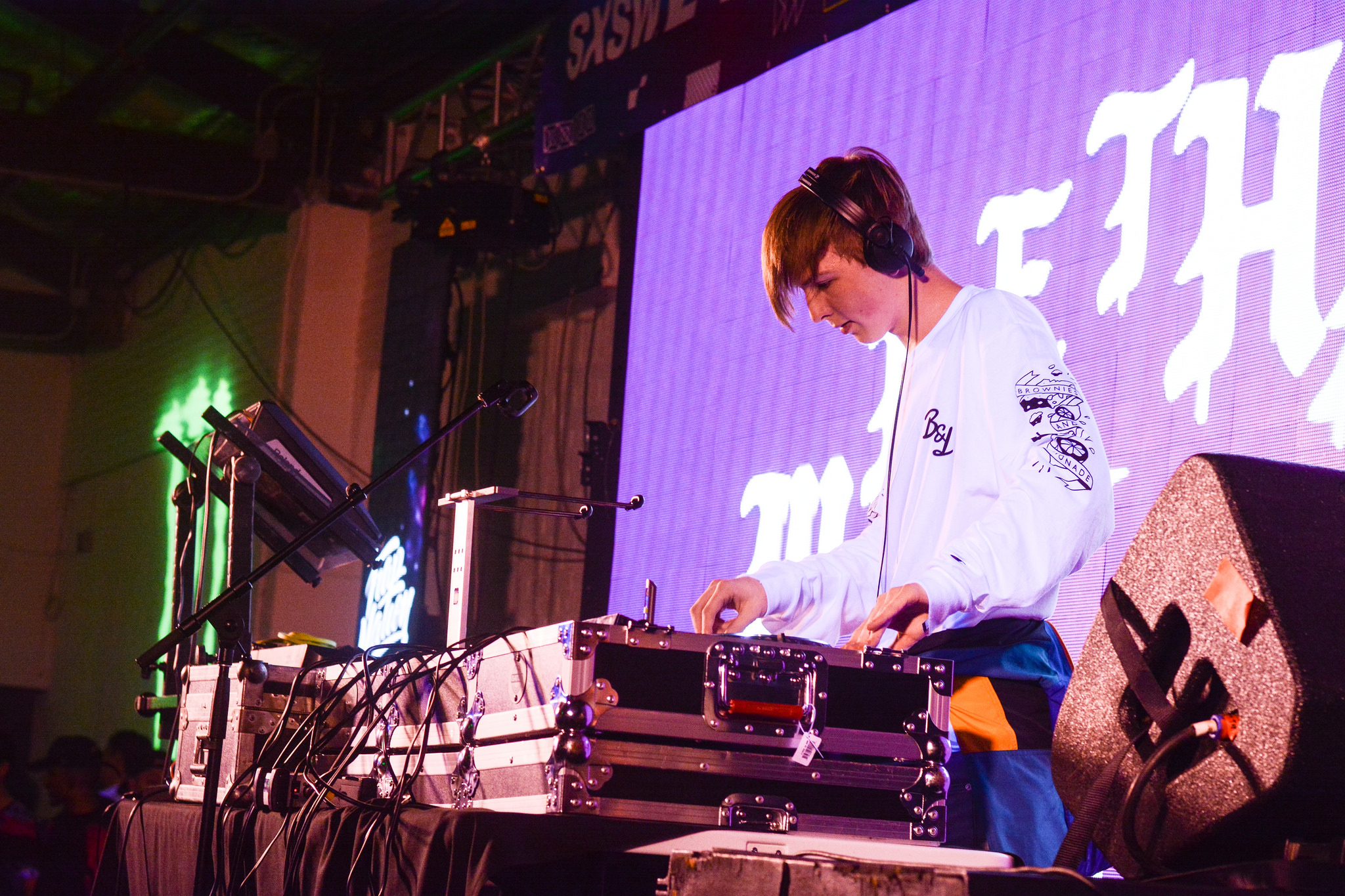
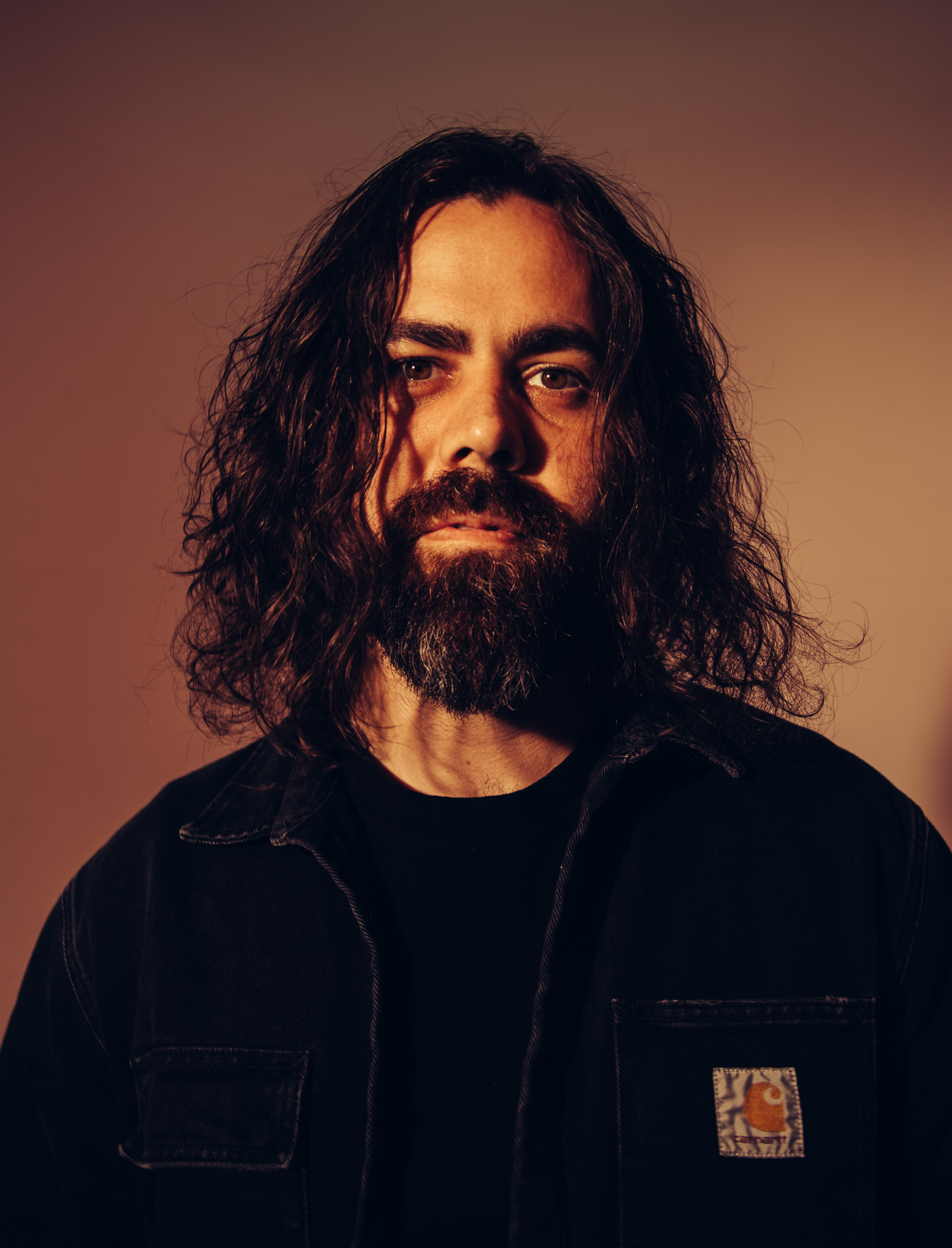
Co-writers Ethan Snoreck, better known by his stage name Whethan (left), and Tyler Johnson (right)

"Evil Twin" was written by Trainor, Joshua Kear, Ethan Snoreck and Tyler Johnson, and produced by Johnson and Andrew Wells. Trainor's family members are featured on backing vocals.

Hannah Mylrea of NME described the song as "a cloying cut of electronic pop that sees Trainor try to distance herself from the sides of her that she doesn't like, blaming her indiscretions on her evil twin". Pitchfork's Dani Blum called the song "an apology from Trainor for the 'crazy bitch' side of her, which makes her 'make my bad decisions, but I'm innocent.'" Lyrically, Trainor "apologizes for — and embraces — her wild side, or her 'evil twin'", according to Rolling Stone's Claire Shaffer. Mark Kennedy of the Associated Press described "Evil Twin" as a "'60s-inspired tune".

== Critical reception ==
Libby Schilz of The Daily Nebraskan wrote, "'Evil Twin' is a perfect example of [Trainor's] boldness, as she sheds light on her insecurities about bad decisions to the point of personifying them", and said Trainor "puts a humorous spin on these insecurities while showing her annoyance for her inability to overcome them". E!'s Billy Nilles described the song as a "delightfully disco-influenced pop bop", and Forbes contributor Lauren Alvarez wrote, "'Evil Twin' is the most reminiscent of her previous songs, and explores the side of herself that doesn't make the brightest decisions. It's definitely a must-listen to song from the LP!" Idolator's Mike Nied called the song a "candy-coated bop the likes of which no one does quite like Meghan". In his review of Treat Myself, he wrote:

The rollicking bop introduces us to her 'crazy bitch' alter ego after a wild night filled with regrets. However, it is an outlier on the tracklist for me. In that the track is a little too twee for my taste. That being said, there's no denying the performance she delivers over the breezy beats.

Jenesaispop's Jordi Bardají recommended "Evil Twin" as one of Treat Myself's standout tracks. Stereogum's Chris DeVille included the song in his "Pop Five" of the "2020 State of Pop Address", and Courtney E. Smith of Refinery29 included "Evil Twin" in her list of "top songs of Winter 2020 so far".

== Personnel ==
Credits adapted from the album liner notes, Treat Myself (2020).

- Ethan Snoreck – composer, drums, engineer, synthesizer
- Josh Kear – composer, background vocals
- Tyler Johnson – composer, producer, drums, background vocals
- Anders Mouridsen – electric guitar
- Maurice Ellis – bass
- Bo Bodnar – engineer, background vocals
- Brendan Dekora – engineer
- Drew Taubenfeld – guitar
- Serban Ghenea – mixing engineer
- Dan Higgins – saxophone
- Meghan Trainor – composer, lead vocals, background vocals
- Andrew Wells – producer, bass, drums, engineer, guitar, recording engineer, synthesizer
- Ron Schaer – trumpet
- Christopher Lynch – background vocals
- Daryl Sabara – background vocals
- Gary Trainor – background vocals
- Justin Trainor – background vocals
- Kelli Trainor – background vocals
- Ryan Trainor – background vocals
- Sam Berger – background vocals
