= Treat Myself =

2020 studio album by Meghan Trainor

Studio album by Meghan Trainor
- Released: January 31, 2020
- Studios: Mike Sabath Home Studio; The Train Station; EastWest (Hollywood); Dan Gleyzer Home Studio; Brickboi (Los Angeles); Black Star; The Cave (Nashville, Tennessee); Some Random
- Genres: Pop; doo-wop; funk; R&B
- Length: 46:28
- Label: Epic
- Producers: Mike Sabath; Meghan Trainor; Ojivolta; King Henry; Daniel Gleyzer; Zack Skelton; Sigala; Tyler Johnson; Andrew Wells; Whethan; Jon Castelli; Some Randoms

Meghan Trainor chronology
The Love Train (2019)	Treat Myself (2020)	A Very Trainor Christmas (2020)

Singles from Treat Myself
- 1. "No Excuses" Released: March 1, 2018; 2. "Wave" Released: September 27, 2019; 3. "Nice to Meet Ya" Released: January 31, 2020

Singles from Treat Myself (Deluxe)
- 1. "Make You Dance" Released: July 10, 2020

Treat Myself (stylized in all caps) is the third studio album by the American singer-songwriter Meghan Trainor. Epic Records released it on January 31, 2020, after delaying it for over a year from its originally scheduled release date. Trainor worked with producers including Mike Sabath, Tyler Johnson, Ojivolta, and Andrew Wells. Initially inspired by pop artists and her experiences with panic disorder, Trainor rewrote the album to adapt to changing trends in the music industry and the rising popularity of hip-hop. It features guest appearances by Sabath, Nicki Minaj, Lennon Stella, Sasha Sloan, the Pussycat Dolls, and AJ Mitchell.

Treat Myself is a pop, doo-wop, funk, and R&B record with hip-hop influences which explores themes such as body image, self-esteem issues, and relationships. Trainor promoted the album with public appearances and televised performances. Several tracks released in 2018 were scrapped from it after the delay. Treat Myself includes three singles: "No Excuses" (2018) and "Nice to Meet Ya" (2020), which respectively peaked at numbers 46 and 89 on the US Billboard Hot 100, and "Wave" (2019).

Some reviewers thought the quality of Treat Myself was worth the wait and effectively showcased Trainor's artistic range, while others commented on its production choices and criticized its lyrical themes. In the US, the album debuted at number 25 on the Billboard 200. It peaked within the top 40 in Australia, Canada, New Zealand, Scotland, Spain, and Switzerland.

== Background ==
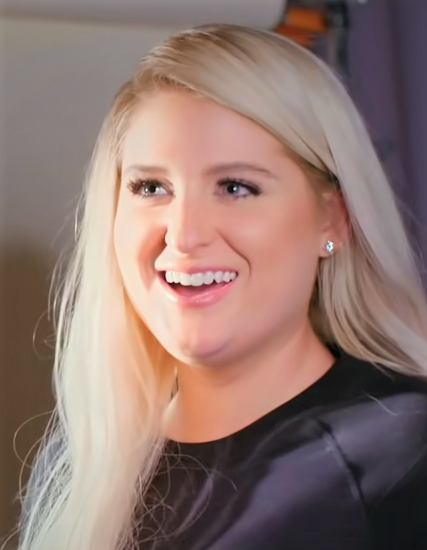
Meghan Trainor (pictured in 2020) wrote four albums' worth of material for Treat Myself.

After previously suffering a vocal cord hemorrhage in the summer of 2015, the American singer-songwriter Meghan Trainor was placed on vocal rest for the second time in December 2016, forcing her to cancel her scheduled appearances at the Billboard Women in Music event and the Jingle Ball Tour 2016. She was not allowed to talk for several months and underwent her second vocal cord surgery the following year. The procedure took a toll on Trainor's mental health: "I got mentally destroyed from my second vocal surgery. I was just sad that it happened again, because they tell you, 'You won't deal with this ever again,' and then I did." She began seeing a psychologist and therapists after being diagnosed with panic disorder by her doctors. Trainor doubted if she was "built to be a pop star" and whether she would be able to continue her music career: "The fact that every surgery happened after an album cycle — two albums, two surgeries [...] I went to a very dark place of like, 'How will I ever tour again? How will I get to do promo?' I still get anxiety and a little scared". A year later, she believed her voice sounded "better than ever".

== Recording and production ==
Trainor began recording songs for her third major-label studio album while still recovering from the surgery. She held the first session with Jacob Kasher Hindlin, who suggested working with the novice producer Andrew Wells. They wrote the song "Let You Be Right" within a few hours and Trainor decided "he was the one". Her early influences for the album included Britney Spears and ABBA, and she wanted to bring Spears, NSYNC, and Backstreet Boys-inspired pop songs "back to radio". In March 2018, Trainor stated that the album was her "best work yet" and the material consistently displayed her improved songwriting. She said it was "fun, dance-y stuff with a little funk" and had an "'80s and '90s feel" two months later.

Trainor was inspired to write the title track of Treat Myself when her therapist asked her to "reward" herself after surviving bouts of anxiety from her panic disorder. According to her, the initial version of the album included "too many" love songs; she released six of them on the extended play The Love Train (2019) to coincide with Valentine's Day. Trainor said of the ones she saved for the album: "This is what I want my music to sound like and these are the songs I love. I don't care what's playing on the radio or what they don't accept. I love this, and I'm proud to perform these songs".

Trainor eventually took a more commercial direction with Treat Myself. In January 2020, she revealed that she wrote four albums worth of material in an attempt to adapt to changing trends in the music industry; she wanted to "make pop records that feel relevant in an era when hip-hop reigns". Trainor kept writing more tracks until she and Epic Records agreed she could not "beat these songs". Mike Sabath produced four tracks on Treat Myself. Sigala, with whom Trainor had collaborated on the song "Just Got Paid" (2018), also contributed to production. Others included Ojivolta, King Henry, Daniel Gleyzer, Zach Skelton, Tyler Johnson, Wells, Whethan, Jon Castelli, and Some Randoms. Trainor connected with Nicki Minaj through a shared manager and met Nicole Scherzinger while filming their television shows at the same lot; both artists feature on the album. (Note: Scherzinger's appearance is credited to the Pussycat Dolls, an American girl group she was a member of.)

== Composition ==
=== Overview ===
The standard edition of Treat Myself includes 15 tracks; the deluxe edition contains three additional songs and two acoustic versions and the Target edition features two bonus tracks. The album predominantly has a pop, doo-wop, funk, and R&B sound. According to AllMusic's Matt Collar, Trainor embraced "club-ready dance rhythms and contemporary R&B hooks" with it, incorporating "screwdriver bass lines, shimmery synths, and bright vocal overdubs" and moving towards the "slick, hip-hop-infused funk" musical styling of Bruno Mars. The album features the same girl group yells and hooks as Trainor's previous two full-length albums, according to PopMatters' Jessica Brant. Dani Blum of Pitchfork described Treat Myself as a combination of several ballads, funk, and "garish shudders of EDM". Lyrically, the album discusses self-love and body positivity. Daniel Bromfield of Spectrum Culture perceived its lyrical intention as wanting to help "those struggling with body-image issues, self-esteem issues and relationship issues".

=== Songs ===
"Nice to Meet Ya"
Trainor wrote four albums worth of material to adapt to changing trends in the music industry and the popularity of hip-hop. "Nice to Meet Ya" is an R&B song with hip-hop beats and a rap verse from Minaj.

The album opens with "Wave", a house ballad about the emotional effects of a fledgling relationship, which features Sabath as the remorseful lover requesting a final chance from his partner. "Nice to Meet Ya" is an R&B song with hip-hop beats, which features a rap verse from Minaj and a chorus whispered by Trainor. The third track, "Funk", is a funk-influenced pop song with burred guitar and a retro beat. The titular word is used as an innuendo: "I miss the way we used to funk." Riff's David Gill described it as "a musical tribute to '80s funk bands like Cameo and Parliament" and Collar believed it recalled the "'80s throwback vibe" of Mars's 2014 single "Uptown Funk". Trainor repeatedly asks listeners to love themselves in the chorus of "Babygirl", an electropop and R&B song. The fifth track, "Workin' on It", featuring Lennon Stella and Sasha Sloan, is a minimalistic and downtempo song about Trainor's issues with self-acceptance and how she is still working on ameliorating herself.

"Ashes" is a sentimental breakup song on which Trainor leaves behind a contentious relationship. On the seventh track, "Lie to Me", she expresses frustration about her partner not reciprocating her affection and asks him to lie that he is still enamored by her. On "Here to Stay", an old-school R&B song, Trainor describes a committed romantic relationship: "I fall apart in front of your face / But you think it's cute, you make fun of me." "Blink" is about empowerment and contains influences of R&B and dubstep. She refers to herself as an "innocent bad bitch" and declares: "I'm crazy but I'm sweet". The 10th track, "Genetics", is a jazz-influenced funk song featuring the Pussycat Dolls. It incorporates diphthongs during several words ending with the syllable "od" in its chorus; critics likened its electronic soundbed to the work of Daft Punk. Trainor sings "how you get that bod? Is it from God?" and spells out the song title like a cheerleader chant: "G-E-N-E-T-I-C-S".

"Evil Twin" is an electronic pop song with influences of house music, on which Trainor blames her bad decisions during a night out on her "evil twin". On "After You", a piano-driven ballad, Trainor and AJ Mitchell duet about how they will never be able to fall in love again if they ever separate from their lovers. "Another Opinion" is a groovy song with electro-pop connotations, on which Trainor addresses her detractors: "If you don't like me, it's not my fault / At all / It's just another opinion." The 14th track, "No Excuses", is a pop song with country influences. In its lyrics, Trainor demands respect; the song was inspired by her experiences with her superiors in the music industry, who disrespected her opinions. The standard edition of Treat Myself closes with "Have You Now", a love song. The Target version includes "All the Ways", which was inspired by a conversation between Trainor and her husband, Daryl Sabara, and the title track. The deluxe edition contains the dance-pop song "Make You Dance", "Underwater" featuring Dillon Francis, "You Don't Know Me", and acoustic versions of "Ashes" and "Workin' on It".

== Release and promotion ==
Treat Myself's release was marked by several delays. On June 19, 2018, the album was made available for pre-order and Trainor announced August 31, 2018, as the release date. In August, she postponed its release and stated: "I'm in such an amazing place and I can't stop writing songs… I've decided to move my new album Treat Myself until I get everything out of my head and recorded in the studio." After briefly being projected to release in January 2019, Trainor announced on November 6, 2019, that the album would come out in January the following year, "for realz this time". Epic Records released its original and Target editions on January 31, 2020, followed by the deluxe version on July 17, 2020.

Treat Myself was promoted with the release of several singles. "No Excuses" was released as the album's lead single on March 1, 2018, and peaked at number 46 on the US Billboard Hot 100. Epic Records chose "Let You Be Right" as the follow-up single against Trainor's wishes, and it failed to enter the chart. This was followed by three more promo tracks during 2018. (Note: These included "Can't Dance", "All the Ways", and the title track. The promotional singles released in 2019 were "Genetics", "Workin' on It", "Evil Twin", and "Blink".) "Wave" was released as the second single from Treat Myself on September 27, 2019. All of the 2018 releases except "No Excuses" were scrapped from the album. "Nice to Meet Ya" was promoted as the third single from Treat Myself on the latter's release day and reached number 89 on the Hot 100. "Make You Dance" was released as a single from the deluxe edition.

Trainor promoted Treat Myself with public appearances and televised live performances. In 2018, she performed "No Excuses" on The Ellen DeGeneres Show, The Tonight Show Starring Jimmy Fallon, The Today Show, the iHeartRadio MMVAs, Sounds Like Friday Night, and the Sport Relief telethon. The following year, she performed tracks from the album on The Today Show's Citi concert series and The Voice. In February 2020, Trainor performed "Blink" at the American Heart Association's Go Red For Women Red Dress Collection fashion show and "Nice to Meet Ya" on The Tonight Show Starring Jimmy Fallon. The COVID-19 lockdowns prevented her from giving further live performances. She performed "Ashes" for her Together At Home virtual concert series, in association with the Global Citizen Festival, and "Wave" for her Billboard Live At Home concert and iHeartRadio's First Responder Fridays in April 2020.

== Critical reception ==
Professional ratings
Aggregate scores
Source	Rating
Metacritic	51/100
Review scores
Source	Rating
AllMusic	3/5 stars
The Arts Desk	3/5 stars
Idolator	4/5
The Irish News	3/5
NME	2/5 stars
Pitchfork	4.1/10
PopMatters	6/10
The Times	3/5 stars

Treat Myself received mixed reviews from critics. At Metacritic, which assigns a weighted mean rating out of 100 to reviews from mainstream critics, the album received an average score of 51, based on four reviews. (Note: Metacritic's score accounted for reviews from PopMatters, AllMusic, Pitchfork, and NME.) Rolling Stone's Tomás Mier described it as a "pop-perfect record" and "one of Trainor's most underrated works". Idolator's Mike Wass named Treat Myself the 66th best pop album released in 2020 and believed it was "one of those projects that is destined to attain cult status in years to come". Mike Nied of the same website, Lucy Mapstone of The Irish News, and Lauren Alvarez of Forbes thought the album was "worth the wait"; Nied opined that Trainor successfully projected her artistic range, charm, and confidence and Alvarez said it effectively showcased her "talent, lyricism and overall range".

Some critics commented on the production. Alvarez believed Treat Myself offered a contemporary interpretation of Trainor's earlier music, which she considered a novel and infectious method to captivate listeners: "the intricacy of instruments, sounds, beats, lyrics and production all received superior treatments". Collar thought the album "continues to evolve her sound" but fails to recreate the charisma of Title (2015) due to its "sophisticated production style". On the other hand, Russ Coffey of The Arts Desk believed it maintained "her cheeky, girl-next-door charm" despite its shortcomings. Blum opined that Treat Myself became enervating due to the "confusing production choices".

The lyrical themes on Treat Myself received commentary. Brant thought the album's feminist tropes were disingenuous and caused by Trainor giving into pressure from the music industry. NME's Hannah Mylrea called it a vexing listen due to its "sickly sweet and filled with cliché lyrics" and "insipid songs". Blum opined that Treat Myself depends on the concept of "female duplicity" and fails to truly empower women: "Trainor is left constantly placating [...] This is self-flagellation disguised as motivation." Bromfield stated that "there's always something a little off about this album". He criticized the portrayal of a codependent relationship dynamic in its love songs.

== Commercial performance ==
At the time of its release, Treat Myself became Trainor's lowest-charting album in several countries. The album debuted at number 25 on the US Billboard 200 and the Canadian Albums Chart, both dated February 15, 2020. It peaked at number 41 in the UK. In Australia, Treat Myself reached number 13. The album charted at number 40 in New Zealand. Elsewhere, it peaked at number 27 in Spain, number 28 in Switzerland, number 40 in Scotland, number 58 in Ireland, number 67 in Austria, number 87 in the Netherlands, number 99 in Germany, and number 109 in Belgium.

== Track listing ==
Standard edition
No.	Title	Writer(s)	Producer(s)	Length
1.	"Wave" (featuring Mike Sabath)	Meghan Trainor; Sabath	Sabath; M. Trainor	2:56
2.	"Nice to Meet Ya" (featuring Nicki Minaj)	M. Trainor; Raul Cubina; Mark Williams; Scott Harris; Minaj	Ojivolta	3:17
3.	"Funk"	M. Trainor; Sabath; Eddie Benjamin; Ryan Trainor	Sabath; Benjamin^{[a]}; M. Trainor^{[a]}	3:11
4.	"Babygirl"	M. Trainor; Sabath; Samuel Romans	Sabath; M. Trainor^{[a]}	3:20
5.	"Workin' on It" (featuring Lennon Stella and Sasha Sloan)	M. Trainor; Stella; Alexandra Yatchenko; Henry Allen	King Henry; Emi Dragoi^{[a]}	3:01
6.	"Ashes"	M. Trainor; Sophie Frances Cooke; Daniel Gleyzer	Gleyzer; M. Trainor^{[a]}; Justin Trainor^{[b]}	3:17
7.	"Lie to Me"	M. Trainor; R. Trainor; J. Trainor	Ojivolta; M. Trainor^{[a]}; J. Trainor^{[a]}; Theodore Cayetano Tittman^{[a]}; Peter Aiden Miller^{[a]}	2:40
8.	"Here to Stay"	M. Trainor; Benjamin; Zach Skelton; Gleyzer	Skelton; M. Trainor^{[a]}; Gleyzer^{[a]}	3:03
9.	"Blink"	M. Trainor; Bruce Fielder; Steve Manovski; R. Trainor	Sigala; M. Trainor^{[a]}	2:47
10.	"Genetics" (featuring The Pussycat Dolls)	M. Trainor; Justin Tranter; Sabath; Nicole Scherzinger; R. Trainor	Sabath; M. Trainor^{[a]}	2:57
11.	"Evil Twin"	M. Trainor; Joshua Kear; Tyler Johnson; Ethan Snoreck	Johnson; Andrew Wells; Whethan; M. Trainor^{[a]}	3:12
12.	"After You" (featuring AJ Mitchell)	M. Trainor; Johnson; Anders Mouridsen; J. Trainor	Johnson; M. Trainor^{[a]}; The Vultures^{[a]}	3:26
13.	"Another Opinion"	M. Trainor; Johnson; R. Trainor	Johnson; Jon Castelli; M. Trainor^{[a]}	3:03
14.	"No Excuses"	M. Trainor; Jacob Kasher Hindlin; Wells	Wells; M. Trainor^{[a]}	2:32
15.	"Have You Now"	M. Trainor; Cooke	Some Randoms; Sabath^{[a]}; M. Trainor^{[a]}	3:46
Total length:				46:28

Target edition
No.	Title	Writer(s)	Producer(s)	Length
16.	"All the Ways"	M. Trainor; Hindlin; Wells	Wells	2:55
17.	"Treat Myself"	M. Trainor; Tobias Jesso Jr.; Wells; R. Trainor	Wells	2:54
Total length:				52:17

Digital deluxe edition
No.	Title	Writer(s)	Producer(s)	Length
16.	"Make You Dance"	M. Trainor; Wells; Anthony Rossomando; Grace Barker	Asa Welch	3:11
17.	"Underwater" (featuring Dillon Francis)	M. Trainor; Francis; James Rushent; R. Trainor	Francis; Rushent	2:41
18.	"You Don't Know Me"	M. Trainor; Michael Pollack; Alex Schwartz; Joe Khajadourian	The Futuristics	3:30
19.	"Ashes" (Acoustic)	M. Trainor; Cooke; Gleyzer		3:14
20.	"Workin' on It" (Acoustic)	M. Trainor; Stella; Yatchenko; Allen		3:06
Total length:				62:10

=== Notes ===
- ^{^[a]} signifies an additional producer.
- ^{^[b]} signifies a vocal producer.

== Credits and personnel ==
Credits are adapted from the liner notes.

=== Recording locations ===
- Recorded and engineered at Mike Sabath Home Studio (1 and 15), The Train Station (2–4, 6–8, 12 and 15), EastWest Studios (Hollywood) (5 and 10–14), Dan Gleyzer Home Studio (6), Brickboi Studios (Los Angeles) (7), Black Star Studio (9), The Cave (Nashville, Tennessee) (12–13) and Some Random Studio (15)
- Mixed at MixStar Studios (Virginia Beach, Virginia) (1, 3, 5 and 9–15), Jon Castelli Studio (2 and 6–8) and Mike Sabath Home Studio (4)
- Mastered at Sterling Sound (New York City) (1 and 3–15) and Becker Mastering (2)
- Management – Jeffrey Azoff, Tommy Bruce and Sali Kharazi, Full Stop Management
- Legal – Aaron Rosenberg, Josh Karp and Haley Golding, Myman Greenspan

=== Personnel ===
- Meghan Trainor – lead vocals, background vocals, executive producer, claps, synthesizer (1 and 13), ukulele (13)
- Mike Sabath – featured vocals, production, background vocals, recording, engineering, mixing, bass (1, 4 and 15), drums (1 and 3–4), synthesizer (1 and 3), mellotron (4), piano (4 and 15), guitar (15)
- Ojivolta – production, engineering, programming, recording
- King Henry – production, recording, guitar (5)
- Dan Gleyzer – production, recording, engineering
- Zach Skelton – production, engineering
- Sigala – production, recording
- Tyler Johnson – production, drum programming, background vocals, recording, claps, keyboards (12–13), piano (12–13), synthesizer (13)
- Andrew Wells – production, drum programming, recording, engineering, guitar (11 and 14), bass (11 and 14), synthesizer (11 and 14)
- Whethan – production, drum programming, engineering, synthesizer (11)
- Jon Castelli – production, mixing, drum programming
- Some Randoms – production, programming, recording, instrumentation, keyboards (15)
- Nicki Minaj – featured vocals, background vocals
- Lennon Stella – featured vocals
- Sasha Sloan – featured vocals
- Nicole Scherzinger – featured vocals, background vocals
- AJ Mitchell – featured vocals
- Camila Viola – background vocals
- Daryl Sabara – background vocals, claps
- Jordan Federman – background vocals, claps, tambourine (3)
- Ryan Trainor – background vocals, scream, claps
- Mark Williams – background vocals
- Justin Trainor – background vocals, engineering, recording, vocal production
- Eddie Benjamin – background vocals, bass (3), synthesizer (3), guitar (8), bass (8)
- Tristan Hurd – background vocals, trumpet (3)
- Theodore (Caye) Tittman – background vocals
- Frances – background vocals
- Peter Aiden Miller – background vocals
- Josh Kear – background vocals
- Kelli Trainor – background vocals
- Sam Berger – background vocals
- Christopher Lynch – background vocals
- Gary Trainor – background vocals
- Jacob Kasher Hindlin – background vocals
- Aubry "Big Juice" Delaine – recording
- Matt Wallach – engineering, background vocals
- Mark Parfitt – engineering
- Bo Bodnar – engineering, background vocals
- Brendan Dekora – engineering
- Danny Klein – engineering
- Matt Campfield – engineering
- Jonas Jalhay – programming, recording, guitar (14)
- Maurice Ellis – bass (11)
- Anders Mouridsen – electric guitar (11), piano (12), keyboards (12), guitar (12)
- Drew Taubenfeld – guitar (11)
- Ron Schaer – trumpet (11)
- Dan Higgins – saxophone (11)
- The Vultures – string arrangement, sound design
- Nick Lobel – drum programming, engineering
- Tommy Bruce – claps
- Nathaniel Cochrane – claps
- Serban Ghenea – mixing
- John Hanes – mixing
- Ingmar Carlson – mixing
- Randy Merrill – mastering
- Dale Becker – mastering
- Charm Ladonna – creative director
- Gavin Taylor – album cover design
- Hanna Hillier – photography
- Hayley Atkin – styling
- Dimitris Giannetos – hair
- Alison Christian – makeup

== Charts ==
Weekly chart positions for Treat Myself
Chart (2020)	Peak position
Australian Albums (ARIA)	13
Austrian Albums (Ö3 Austria)	67
Belgian Albums (Ultratop Flanders)	109
Belgian Albums (Ultratop Wallonia)	119
Canadian Albums (Billboard)	25
Dutch Albums (Album Top 100)	87
German Albums (Offizielle Top 100)	99
Irish Albums (IRMA)	58
New Zealand Albums (RMNZ)	40
Scottish Albums (Official Charts)	40
Spanish Albums (Promusicae)	27
Swiss Albums (Schweizer Hitparade)	28
UK Albums (Official Charts)	41
US Billboard 200	25

== Release history ==
Release dates and format(s) for Treat Myself
Region	Date	Format(s)	Label(s)	Edition	Ref.
Various	January 31, 2020	CD; digital download; LP; streaming	Epic	Original	
Various	January 31, 2020	CD	Epic	Target	
Various	July 17, 2020	Digital download; streaming	Epic	Deluxe	
