= Go Slow =

Single by Gorgon City, Kaskade and Roméo

from the album Redux 003
- Released: 9 May 2019
- Genre: House
- Length: 3:38
- Label: Virgin EMI
- Songwriter(s): Ryan Raddon; Finn Bjarnson; John Hancock; Kye Gibbon; Matthew Robson-Scott; Roméo Testa
- Producer(s): Gorgon City; Kaskade

Gorgon City singles chronology
"Delicious" (2019)	"Go Slow" (2019)	"Elizabeth Street" (2019)

Kaskade singles chronology
"Be the One" (2019)	"Go Slow" (2019)	"With You" (2019)

"Go Slow" is a song by English production duo Gorgon City, American DJ Kaskade and American singer Roméo. It was released on 9 May 2019 through Virgin EMI Records. It reached number one on the US Dance Club Songs chart in August 2019.

== Critical reception ==
Las Vegas Weekly wrote that the track "demonstrates Gorgon City's crossover appeal—the duo can straddle the underground and the mainstream and find loyalists in both realms". Dancing Astronaut called the song a "bassline-driven house production that reverberates from speakers with an unmistakable sense of sonic power" and acclaimed Roméo's "buttery" vocals as providing a "point of contrast to the tinny grit of the song's defining bass elements". EDM.com described the track as having "melodic and dreamy vocal sections" as well as featuring "a funky and danceable bass line over a groovy house beat".

== Charts ==
=== Weekly charts ===
Chart (2019)	Peak position
US Dance Club Songs (Billboard)	1
US Hot Dance/Electronic Songs (Billboard)	22

=== Year-end charts ===
Chart (2019)	Position
US Dance Club Songs (Billboard)	1
US Hot Dance/Electronic Songs (Billboard)	95

== See also ==
- List of Billboard number-one dance songs of 2019
