= The Toy Soldiers =

- Theatrical Release Poster
- Directed by: Erik Peter Carlson
- Written by: Erik Peter Carlson
- Produced by: Mark Baier
- Starring: Najarra Townsend; Constance Brenneman; Chandler Rylko; Jeanette May Steiner; Samuel Nolan
- Edited by: Alex Bordino
- Music by: Nathaniel Levisay
- Production company: Riding Hood Motion Pictures
- Distributed by: Mance Media (See Matthew Mancinelli)
- Release date: June 8, 2014 (Dances With Films)
- Running time: 144 minutes
- Country: United States
- Language: English

The Toy Soldiers is a 2014 American coming-of-age drama film was written and directed by Erik Peter Carlson, and starring Najarra Townsend, Constance Brenneman, Chandler Rylko, and Jeanette May Steiner.

Set in the 1980s, five coming-of-age stories unravel together on the final evening that local hangout, The Soldiers Roller Rink, closes its doors. During an ongoing night of sex, drugs, and rock "n" roll, the innocence of youth will unravel and each individuals life will be changed forever.

== Background ==
Erik Peter Carlson's sophomore feature film portrays an unsentimentally realistic story about the life, complexities and savageries faced by teens and their families in the 1980s culture of America. Many scenes from the film were shot at the Huntington Beach Pier and the Moonlight Rollerway in Glendale.

The film premiered on June 8, 2014 at the Dances With Films festival as the Closing Night Feature at the TCL Chinese Theatre. The film was theatrically released November 14, 2014 in AMC Theatres.

== Plot ==
Over the course of one night, five parallel coming-of-age stories dramatize the stages of grief. A mother in a custody battle over her children finds tranquility in alcohol. The abuse from her ex-husband still haunts the children, a 19-year-old drug addict and his younger brother, a closeted homosexual and target of bullying. Another teen offers sexual favors to gain acceptance, and encounters a challenged classmate who would do anything for her love. There's also the story of the redheaded beauty who is haunted by a secret, tragic past. These lives and others will change forever on this evening when the Toy Soldiers Roller Rink, their local hangout spot, closes its doors for the final time.

== Cast ==
- Najarra Townsend as Angel
- Constance Brenneman as Mary Harris
- Chandler Rylko as Elliot Harris
- Jeanette May Steiner as Layla
- Samuel Nolan as Jack Harris
- Nick Frangione as Steve
- Amelia Haberman as Sue Harris
- Matt Harrelson as The Stud
- Megan Hensley as Cricket
- Andre Myers as Wilson
- Kevin Pinassi as Clyde Harris
- Thatcher Robinson as Jason
- Izzy Pollak as Harold Beaver
- Marco Tazioli as Freddie
- Danno White as Sean
- Kelsey Impicciche as Female skater

== Screenings ==
The film premiered at Dances With Films on June 8, 2014, and on October 2, 2014, got its screening at the SoCal Independent Film Festival.

On October 18, 2014, the film got its screening at the Hollywood Film Festival.

On November 14, 2014, The Toy Soldiers was premiered on red carpet at the Universal CityWalk Hollywood.

== Reception ==
On review aggregator website Rotten Tomatoes, the film has a 50% approval rating based on 6 reviews, with an average ranking of 7/10.

Dennis Harvey of Variety wrote "With its stilted monologues and crudely melodramatic air of "shocking realism," Erik Peter Carlson's sophomore feature feels like a series of interlocking fringe-theater one-acts that have only grown more artificial onscreen".

The Village Voice's Sherilyn Connelly commented that "As compelling as an individual thread or scene might be, the picture as a whole lacks forward momentum, as is often the case with films with asynchronous timelines".

The Hollywood Reporter called the film "A not-so-convincing teenage wasteland".

According to Gary Goldstein of the Los Angeles Times the film have a "way overlong ensemble melodrama".

Lawrence Toppman of The Charlotte Observer was of a different opinion, his reaction was "The rough honesty hooks you, and overlapping storylines eventually sort themselves out".

== Awards and nominations ==
The film received multiple nominations at its 2014 festival screening:

- 'Industry Choice Award' and 'Audience Award for Best Feature Film' at Dances With Films
- Nominated 'Best Emerging Filmmaker' for Erik Peter Carlson at Hollywood Film Festival
- Nominations for 'Best Actor' for Samuel Nolan, 'Best Actress - Achievement in Acting' for Constance Brenneman, 'Best Cinematography - Feature Film' for Dan Witrock, and 'Best Screenplay' and 'Best Director - Feature Film', and 'SoCal IFF Award' for Erik Peter Carlson at the SoCal Independent Film Festival.
