= Lies of the Heart: The Story of Laurie Kellogg =

- Genre: Biography; Drama; Romance; Crime
- Written by: Judith Paige Mitchell
- Directed by: Michael Toshiyuki Uno
- Starring: Jennie Garth; Gregory Harrison; Steven Keats; Francis Guinan
- Music by: Kim Scharnberg
- Country of origin: United States
- Original language: English

Production
- Executive producers: Daniel H. Blatt; Judith Paige Mitchell
- Producer: Sam Manners
- Production locations: Moonlight Rollerway - 5110 San Fernando Road, Glendale, California
- Cinematography: Ronald Víctor García
- Editor: Cari Coughlin
- Running time: 96 minutes
- Production companies: MDT Productions; Daniel H. Blatt Productions; Warner Bros. Television

Original release
- Network: ABC
- Release: January 31, 1994

Lies of the Heart: The Story of Laurie Kellogg is a 1994 American made-for-television crime drama film directed by Michael Toshiyuki Uno. The film is based on actual events and was received with mixed reviews. Variety was positive, claiming that the movie was told with 'great emotional depth'.

== Plot ==
When she is 16, Laurie meets and falls in love with an older man, 31-year-old Bruce Kellogg. She soon moves in with him, not knowing that her stepfather actually sold her to him for $500. They are happy, at first, but it soon becomes clear that he has an obsession with young girls. Naïve, Laurie doesn't notice anything, and does everything to please him. Bruce becomes more and more violent and sexually assaults her. Eventually, Laurie encourages her teenage friends to kill him. After the murder, she is charged with killing her husband, and it is up to her to prove that she was a victim of domestic violence.

== Cast ==
- Jennie Garth as Laurie Kellogg
- Gregory Harrison as Bruce Kellogg
- Steven Keats as Peter Orville
- Francis Guinan as Dennis Bender
- T.C. Warner as Nicole Pappas
- Stephanie Sawyer as Young Nicole
- Robin Frates as Marlene
- Alexis Arquette as Denver McDowell
- Sharon Spelman as Linda Francis
- Jeff Doucette as Ed Francis
- Virginya Keehne as Kristi Mullins
- Gina Philips as Alicia
- Heather Lauren Olson as Alicia (Age 6)
- Phil Buckman as Chuck Sebelist
- Haley Joel Osment as Kyle
