= Act of Love (1980 film) =

- Genre: Drama
- Based on: Act of Love: The Killing of George Zygmanik by Judith Paige Mitchell
- Screenplay by: Michael de Guzman
- Directed by: Jud Taylor
- Starring: Ron Howard; Robert Foxworth; Mickey Rourke; David Spielberg; Jacqueline Brookes
- Music by: Billy Goldenberg
- Country of origin: United States
- Original language: English

Production
- Executive producer: Gerald W. Abrams
- Producer: Bruce J. Sallan
- Cinematography: Michael D. Margulies
- Editor: Gregory Prange
- Running time: 104 minutes
- Production companies: Cypress Point Productions; Paramount Television

Original release
- Network: NBC
- Release: September 24, 1980

Act of Love is a 1980 American made-for-television film adaptation of the book Act of Love: The Killing of George Zygmanik by Judith Paige Mitchell. It is based on a true story.

It was directed by Jud Taylor and written for screen by Michael De Guzman. It stars Ron Howard, Robert Foxworth, Mickey Rourke, David Spielberg and Jacqueline Brookes. The film also features David Faustino. The score was composed by Billy Goldenberg.

The story concerns a man performing euthanasia on his paralyzed brother.

It was the sixth most-watched prime time television program in the United States for the week of its debut in September 1980.
