= Nice to Meet Ya (Meghan Trainor song) =

2020 single by Meghan Trainor featuring Nicki Minaj

Single by Meghan Trainor featuring Nicki Minaj

from the album Treat Myself
- Released: January 31, 2020
- Recorded: 2019
- Genre: Pop; R&B
- Length: 3:17
- Label: Epic
- Songwriters: Meghan Trainor; Raul Cubina; Mark Williams; Scott Harris; Nicki Minaj
- Producer: Ojivolta

Meghan Trainor singles chronology
"Wave" (2019)	"Nice to Meet Ya" (2020)	"Make You Dance" (2020)

Nicki Minaj singles chronology
"Tusa" (2019)	"Nice to Meet Ya" (2020)	"Say So" (remix) (2020)

Music video
- "Nice to Meet Ya" on YouTube

"Nice to Meet Ya" is a song by the American singer-songwriter Meghan Trainor from her third major-label studio album, Treat Myself (2020), featuring rapper Nicki Minaj. Trainor and Minaj wrote it with the songwriter Scott Harris and Raul Cubina and Mark Williams from its production duo, Ojivolta. Epic Records released it as the album's third single on January 31, 2020. Backed by an instrumentation of tingling drums and a hip hop beat, the pop and R&B song has feel-good and characteristically confident lyrics.

Music critics were mixed in their reception of the song. Commercially, "Nice to Meet Ya" charted at number 89 on the US Billboard Hot 100, becoming Trainor's 10th career entry. It also charted in Scotland, Ireland and the United Kingdom. Mathew Cullen directed the music video for "Nice to Meet Ya", which was inspired by Working Girl (1988), and featured Trainor performing dance routines with her female co-workers, and a pink-haired Minaj. Trainor has performed the song on The Tonight Show Starring Jimmy Fallon.

== Background and release ==
Trainor began recording songs for her third major-label studio album, Treat Myself (2020), while still recovering from her second vocal cord surgery in 2017. She released multiple singles from the album the following year, which commercially underperformed. It was delayed several times, while Trainor wrote more songs. After completing four albums worth of material in an attempt to adapt to changing trends in the music industry, she conceived the final version of Treat Myself as a "pop record that feel[s] relevant in an era when hip-hop reigns".

Trainor wrote "Nice to Meet Ya" with Raul Cubina, Mark Williams, Scott Harris, and Nicki Minaj. She played a rough demo of the song for her label, and according to her, "all of Epic Records was like, 'Oh my God, this one.'" Trainor immediately viewed it as a potential single, and she described it as "the flame that [she] need[ed]" and a "relative" to "No" (2016). Regarding Minaj featuring on "Nice to Meet Ya", Trainor recalled being a fan of hers since middle school and stated that it was "the coolest thing of all times". According to her, Minaj took the song to an "'I'm a boss' level", and it felt "really awesome to be supported like that by awesome legends".

On January 22, 2020, Trainor revealed Treat Myself's full tracklist, except for the second track. Six days later, she confirmed the song title as "Nice to Meet Ya". The song was released alongside the album as its third single on January 31, being promoted to mainstream radio stations in Australia. On February 3, 2020, it was serviced to hot adult contemporary radio stations in the United States and contemporary hit radio and hot adult contemporary radio stations in Canada. "Nice to Meet Ya" was sent to contemporary hit radio stations in the former country the following day and for airplay in Italy on March 20, 2020. An extended play featuring remixes of the song by Zookëper and Ape Drums was released on May 22, 2020.

== Composition ==
"Nice to Meet Ya" is three minutes and seventeen seconds long. Ojivolta produced and programmed the song, and they engineered it with Trainor's brother Justin and Aubry "Big Juice" Delaine. Trainor, Minaj, Williams, and Justin provided background vocals alongside Daryl Sabara and Trainor's brother Ryan. Jon Castelli and Ingmar Carlson mixed the song, and Dale Becker mastered it.

"Nice to Meet Ya" begins with an intro which is whispered by Trainor over bouncy beats and Minaj's grunts, the hip-hop infused song grows into a chorus where the beats pick up. It is a "feel-good" pop and R&B song with a "catchy chorus". Its production consists of tingling drums and a hip hop beat. Minaj delivers a rap verse which was described as "characteristically confident" by MTV News' Madeline Roth. The verse includes "quotable" lyrics such as "I pop off 'cause I am the reigning champ" and "One minute I'm nice, the next, a monster".

== Reception ==
"Nice to Meet Ya" received mixed reviews from critics. Idolator's Mike Nied referred to the song as the type of "self-assured banger" that Trainor and Minaj do "so well". He added that with a predictably fierce verse from the latter, it could become the first chart-dominating hit from the era. Calling it an R&B "bop" vaguely reminiscent of "No", Hannah Mylrea of NME stated that it injects a moment of energy on its parent album. Writing for The Arts Desk, Russ Coffey stated that "Nice to Meet Ya" pulls off outrageous hip-hop beats through its sheer chutzpah. Pitchfork's Dani Blum named the song as the "most tolerable track" on Treat Myself, stating that it is engineered to be a banger but its "whisper of a chorus" is "harsh and irritating" and Minaj's verse is "mediocre". Jessica Brant of PopMatters wrote that it does not deviate sonically as much as it does lyrically, and questioned its feminist message as inauthentic.

"Nice to Meet Ya" charted at number 89 on the US Billboard Hot 100 on the chart dated February 15, 2020, marking Trainor's 10th career entrance. At that time, it also gave Minaj her 107th charting song on the Hot 100, tying her with Kanye West as the artist with the fifth-most entries. The song reached number 88 on the UK Singles Chart. It peaked at number 88 on the Irish Singles Chart, and at number 45 in Scotland. "Nice to Meet Ya" reached number 29 on the Australia Digital Tracks chart, and number 13 on the New Zealand Hot Singles chart, an extension to the New Zealand Top 40 Singles chart.

== Music video and promotion ==
Mathew Cullen directed the music video for "Nice to Meet Ya", which was released on January 31, 2020. Trainor described the experience of the music video shoot, which was inspired by the American film Working Girl (1988), as "[her] moment", stating that it made her more nervous than being at the Grammys. She added that Minaj was "funny, really chill and hilarious" at the set. Trainor recalled that she had donned a big jacket because she was insecure about her arms, which the rapper asked her to take off. Minaj assured her that she looked good without it, which empowered the singer to "love [herself] in that moment". After completion of the shoot, Trainor cried and hugged crew members in disbelief about having worked with Minaj.

The music video depicts Trainor and her female co-workers performing dance routines at a male-dominated office. They sport bright pastel-colored pantsuits and '80s hairstyles, while performing a routine that involves twerking. Minaj is introduced when one of the men reads a business card that says "Boss Bitch Nicki Minaj", and depicts the name of the workplace as "Trainor Industries". The pink-haired rapper delivers her verse in a golden elevator, and is later joined by Trainor at her desk in a pink-colored office. In the final sequence, they are clad in Chanel attire for a business meeting.

The music video received positive reviews from critics. Idolator's Mike Nied wrote that the video is brimming with bold costumes, a bit of choreography and so much personality, adding that it makes the song "even better". Writing for Billboard, Heran Mamo stated that "Trainor Industries", the fictitious workplace in the music video, stayed booked and busy for the successful shoot. Michael Saponara of the same magazine called it an "energetic clip", stating that the outfits in the video make for a pleasing aesthetic. Madeline Roth of MTV News thought that Minaj's pink hairdo ups the "boss bitch" factor of the visuals.

On February 6, 2020, Trainor performed the song for the first time on The Tonight Show Starring Jimmy Fallon. The performance featured a choreographed office space routine, where a group of backup dancers joined the singer to mirror the music video for "Nice to Meet Ya".

== Track listing ==
- Album version
1. "Nice to Meet Ya" (featuring Nicki Minaj) – 3:17
- Remix EP
1. "Nice to Meet Ya" (featuring Nicki Minaj) (Zookëper Remix) – 2:30
2. "Nice to Meet Ya" (featuring Nicki Minaj) (Ape Drums Remix) – 3:37
3. "Nice to Meet Ya" (featuring Nicki Minaj) (Spotify bonus track) – 3:17

== Credits and personnel ==
Credits are adapted from the liner notes of Treat Myself.

- Meghan Trainor – lead vocals, background vocals, songwriter
- Nicki Minaj – featured vocals, background vocals, songwriter
- Ojivolta – engineer, producer, programmer, recording engineer
- Raul Cubina – songwriter
- Mark Williams – background vocals, songwriter
- Scott Harris – songwriter
- Ryan Trainor – background vocals
- Justin Trainor – background vocals, engineer
- Daryl Sabara – background vocals
- Aubry "Big Juice" Delaine – recording engineer
- Jon Castelli – mixing engineer
- Ingmar Carlson – mixing engineer
- Dale Becker – mastering engineer

== Charts ==
Chart positions for "Nice to Meet Ya"
Chart (2020)	Peak position
Australia Digital Tracks (ARIA)	29
Ireland (IRMA)	88
New Zealand Hot Singles (RMNZ)	13
Scotland Singles (OCC)	45
UK Singles (OCC)	88
US Billboard Hot 100	89
US Adult Pop Airplay (Billboard)	26
US Pop Airplay (Billboard)	30
US Rolling Stone Top 100	93

== Release history ==
Release dates and format(s) for "Nice to Meet Ya"
Region	Date	Format(s)	Version	Label	Ref.
Various	January 31, 2020	Digital download; streaming	Original	Epic	
Australia	January 31, 2020	Mainstream radio	Original	Epic	
United States	February 3, 2020	Hot adult contemporary	Original	Epic	
Canada	February 3, 2020	Contemporary hit radio; hot adult contemporary	Original	Sony	
United States	February 4, 2020	Contemporary hit radio	Original	Epic	
Italy	March 20, 2020	Radio airplay	Original	Sony	
Various	May 22, 2020	Digital download; streaming	Remixes	Epic	
