= No Excuses (Meghan Trainor song) =

Single by Meghan Trainor

from the album Treat Myself
- Released: March 1, 2018
- Recorded: January 17, 2018
- Genre: Pop
- Length: 2:32
- Label: Epic
- Songwriters: Meghan Trainor; Andrew Wells; Jacob Kasher Hindlin
- Producer: Andrew Wells

Meghan Trainor singles chronology
"I'm a Lady" (2017)	"No Excuses" (2018)	"Let You Be Right" (2018)

Music video
- "No Excuses" on YouTube

"No Excuses" is a song by the American singer-songwriter Meghan Trainor, released on March 1, 2018, as the lead single from her third major-label studio album, Treat Myself (2020). Trainor co-wrote it with Jacob Kasher Hindlin and Andrew Wells, who also produced the track. The track was announced in February 2018 along with its official single artwork. The pop song, with country and R&B influences, has lyrics against sexism. The song received acclaim from music critics, some of whom noted that it was a return to the sound of Trainor's album Title (2015).

"No Excuses" debuted and peaked at number 46 on the US Billboard Hot 100, spending a total of 12 weeks on the chart. It peaked within the top 40 in countries such as Slovakia, Hungary and Scotland. The track has been certified Platinum in the US, Canada and Australia.

Colin Tilley directed the music video for "No Excuses", which features visual effects showing Trainor with two carbon copies of herself and donning various outfits that were inspired by the 1980s, in pastel-colored backdrops. She performed the song on several shows like The Ellen DeGeneres Show, The Tonight Show Starring Jimmy Fallon, Sport Relief, Sounds Like Friday Night and The Today Show, and she included it on the set list of her 2024 concert tour, the Timeless Tour.

== Background and release ==
Trainor had been searching for a producer to create her upcoming third major-label studio album Treat Myself (2020) with, when she conducted the first session for it with songwriter Jacob Kasher Hindlin. He suggested that they work with then-unknown producer Andrew Wells. Trainor, who was expecting the session to go "really bad or really awesome", ended up writing the song "Let You Be Right" with them, and knew Wells "was the one". The trio subsequently wrote "No Excuses" and recorded it on January 17, 2018, with Wells producing the song. "No Excuses" was one of the last songs written for the album. While describing the song, Trainor said, "it needs to be heard right now -- the world could use a song like this. It's about respect -- we need a little more R-E-S-P-E-C-T in the world, especially right now," and called it the "sassiest" song on its parent album.

She revealed the song's title and overall vibe on The Tonight Show Starring Jimmy Fallon by saying, "Don't disrespect me. I'm a woman, have you never met one before?" In the following days, Trainor revealed song lyrics including: "I don't disrespect you, don't you disrespect me", and "Have you lost your mind...open up your eyes." On February 25, 2018, Trainor referenced the song in a letter she published on her site and social media, followed by unveiling of the single's artwork the next day. "No Excuses" was digitally released on March 1, 2018, as the lead single from Treat Myself. It was sent to hot adult contemporary radio in the United States on March 5, and contemporary hit radio the next day. "No Excuses" was also serviced to radio airplay in Italy on March 9.

== Composition ==
"No Excuses" (2018)
A 15-second sample of "No Excuses"' chorus about respect over a funky retro beat.

"No Excuses" is two minutes and 32 seconds long. Andrew Wells produced the song; he engineered it with Matt Wolach and recorded it with Jonas Jalhay at EastWest Studios in Hollywood, Los Angeles. Wells and Jalhay play guitar. Background vocalists include Hindlin, Daryl Sabara, Kelli Trainor, Wolach, and Ryan Trainor. John Hanes and Serban Ghenea mixed it at MixStar Studios in Virginia Beach, Virginia, and Randy Merrill mastered it at Sterling Sound in New York City.

Sonically, "No Excuses" is a pop song with country and R&B influences. It was described as a sexism-blasting empowerment anthem. It features Trainor singing over a "funky, retro" beat. Trainor sings the lyrics, "What you sipping on that got you talking crazy? Looking at me sideways, always coming at me," over an incandescent beat. According to Idolator writer Mike Nied, the song is a confident take-down of a disrespectful suitor, that has "fiery" production and playful lyrics and Trainor sounds "right at home" on it.

== Critical reception ==
The song received acclaim from music critics. Writing for the Daily Express, Shaun Kitchener thought that "No Excuses" was Trainor returning to the "bouncy pop roots" of her first major-label studio album, Title (2015). Entertainment Tonight Canada writer Shakiel Mahjouri noted that the song is taking an aim at sexism, and added that the funky and retro song showcases Trainor's "trademark wit and attitude". MTV News' Sam Prance described the song as "amazing" and "incredible" and dubbed it a "stomping girl-power anthem" with a brilliant and catchy chorus. Hugh McIntyre of Forbes called the song a solid pop offering that is suitable for all ages, adding that it is "tailor-made to be the type of hit that everyone can get behind" and a perfect utilization of the call and response technique.

Writing for Bustle, Emily Czachor praised the track, writing that it "touts a marked air of female grit," which seems "particularly relevant right now." It was described as a "newly minted, funk-laden" song. Jezebel's Clover Hope likened it to Aretha Franklin's rendition of "Respect" (1967) and called it a "sassy Time's Up-inspired jam", adding "the orchestrated sass is built into Trainor's voice." A Plus writer Jill O'Rourke was positive of the song, calling it "empowering" and adding, "it's all about demanding respect." Mike Nied of Idolator wrote that Trainor "has a serious hit on her hands", describing it as "the sassy pop bop we need in 2018". In a 2020 album review, Nied stated that it "still holds up as a gem", adding that "with its supersized production and unapologetically sassy message", it is "so quintessentially Meghan it simply could not have been forgotten".

== Chart performance ==
"No Excuses" debuted and peaked at number 46 on the Billboard Hot 100 and spent a total of 12 weeks on the chart. The song peaked at number 17 on the Adult Contemporary chart and at number 16 on the Mainstream Top 40 chart. It was certified platinum by the Recording Industry Association of America for one million copies certified units. "No Excuses" peaked at number 49 on the Canadian Hot 100, and at number eight on the Canada Hot AC chart, being certified platinum by Music Canada. The song reached number 60 in Australia and number 4 on the New Zealand Heatseekers chart. Despite its low peak, it was certified platinum by the Australian Recording Industry Association in the former country in 2023. "No Excuses" made the top 40 in a few countries: number 21 in Hungary, number 26 in Scotland and number 20 on Slovakia's Radio Hot 100 chart.

== Music video ==
The song's music video, directed by Colin Tilley, premiered on the same day as the song's release, which Trainor had previously teased on her Instagram account along with a short behind-the-scenes look at it. The video features visual effects showing the singer with two "carbon copies" of herself. The video features looks inspired by the '80s, including Trainor donning a denim jacket and another one that looks like a cheerleader outfit. Patrick Hosken of MTV News noted that the looks "belong in a mall-pop video from 1987."

An official choreography video for "No Excuses" was released in collaboration with Zumba, on March 5, 2018. It was directed by Tim Milgram. The visual features a "fun, easy" and empowering routine. It made Trainor the first recording artist to star in an official Zumba choreography video. Describing the initiative, the singer stated that always hearing her music in Zumba classes at the gym made her want to create something special for "No Excuses". She intended the choreography to "empower everyone out there to get on their feet", and think about "respect, sassiness and loving [themselves]". The VP of marketing for Zumba said that they have "always been focused on inspiring others to feel empowered and confident", and they hear these themes in Trainor's music which makes her an ideal partner.

On April 3, 2018, Trainor released a dance video to her Vevo page featuring a group of children and young adults performing "energetic" choreography to the song; Trainor herself does not feature in the video. The singer and her creative director, Charm LaDonna, hand-selected the dancers to execute a choreographed dance routine to "No Excuses".

== Live performances ==
Trainor sang "No Excuses" live on The Ellen DeGeneres Show on March 2, 2018. During this performance, the singer wore white trousers and a denim jacket and was accompanied by a vocal quartet. According to Idolator's Mike Nied, Trainor delivered "pitch-perfect" vocals in front of the simple stage that featured a lot of glitter. She also performed it on The Tonight Show Starring Jimmy Fallon on March 5. Trainor wore a glitter-infused top with a "dazzling" jacket and wide-legged pants, joined by a group of four backup dancers and vocalists who wore black, crystallized outfits. A spacey background was projected on a screen and it ended with the group chanting in unison. On March 23, the singer sang the track during the 2018 Sport Relief telethon on BBC One. On April 6, 2018, Trainor performed the song on Sounds Like Friday Night, and an acoustic version of it during an appearance on The Today Show, alongside her backup singers and a guitarist playing the song, the same month. "No Excuses" was performed as part of a medley with "All About That Bass", "Let You Be Right" and "Me Too" at the 2018 iHeartRadio MMVAs, held on August 26, 2018. She included "No Excuses" on the set list of her 2024 concert tour, the Timeless Tour.

== Credits and personnel ==
Credits are adapted from the liner notes of Treat Myself.

- Andrew Wells – producer, engineer, guitar, recording engineer, songwriter
- Meghan Trainor – lead vocals, background vocals, songwriter
- Jacob Kasher Hindlin – background vocals, songwriter
- Daryl Sabara – background vocals
- Kelli Trainor – background vocals
- Matt Wolach – background vocals, engineer
- Ryan Trainor – background vocals
- Jonas Jalhay – guitar, recording engineer
- John Hanes – mixing engineer
- Serban Ghenea – mixing engineer
- Randy Merrill – mastering engineer

== Charts ==
=== Weekly charts ===
Weekly chart positions for "No Excuses"
Chart (2018)	Peak position
Argentina Anglo (Monitor Latino)	17
Australia (ARIA)	60
Canada Hot 100 (Billboard)	49
Canada AC (Billboard)	13
Canada CHR/Top 40 (Billboard)	24
Canada Hot AC (Billboard)	8
Croatia ARC Top 100 (HRT)	20
Czech Republic Airplay (ČNS IFPI)	77
Ecuador (National-Report)	69
Hungary (Rádiós Top 40)	36
Hungary (Single Top 40)	21
Japan Hot Overseas (Billboard)	18
New Zealand Heatseekers (RMNZ)	4
Scottish Singles Sales (Official Charts)	26
Slovakia Airplay (ČNS IFPI)	20
Slovenia (SloTop50)	46
Sweden Heatseeker (Sverigetopplistan)	6
Switzerland (Schweizer Hitparade)	73
UK Singles (Official Charts)	70
US Billboard Hot 100	46
US Adult Contemporary (Billboard)	17
US Adult Pop Airplay (Billboard)	10
US Dance Club Songs (Billboard)	45
US Dance Airplay (Billboard)	29
US Pop Airplay (Billboard)	16

=== Year-end charts ===
Year-end chart positions for "No Excuses"
Chart (2018)	Position
Hungary (Rádiós Top 40)	93
US Adult Contemporary (Billboard)	43
US Adult Top 40 (Billboard)	37

== Certifications ==
Certifications for "No Excuses"
Region	Certification	Certified units/sales
Australia (ARIA)	Platinum	70,000^{‡}
Brazil (Pro-Música Brasil)	Gold	20,000^{‡}
Canada (Music Canada)	Platinum	80,000^{‡}
New Zealand (RMNZ)	Gold	15,000^{‡}
United Kingdom (BPI)	Silver	200,000^{‡}
United States (RIAA)	Platinum	1,000,000^{‡}
^{‡} Sales+streaming figures based on certification alone.

== Release history ==
Release dates and format(s) for "No Excuses"
Region	Date	Format(s)	Label	Ref.
Various	March 1, 2018	Digital download; streaming	Epic	
United States	March 5, 2018	Adult contemporary radio	Epic	
United States	March 6, 2018	Contemporary hit radio	Epic	
Italy	March 9, 2018	Radio airplay	Sony	
