= Let You Be Right =

Single by Meghan Trainor
- Released: May 10, 2018
- Recorded: 2018
- Genre: Disco; pop
- Length: 2:57
- Label: Epic
- Songwriters: Meghan Trainor; Andrew Wells; Jacob Kasher Hindlin
- Producer: Andrew Wells

Meghan Trainor singles chronology
"No Excuses" (2018)	"Let You Be Right" (2018)	"Can't Dance" (2018)

Music video
- "Let You Be Right" on YouTube

"Let You Be Right" (stylized in all caps) is a song by the American singer-songwriter Meghan Trainor. It was written by Trainor, Andrew Wells and Jacob Kasher Hindlin, and produced by Wells. "Let You Be Right" was announced on May 8, 2018, along with its official single artwork the day after. Epic Records released it on May 10, 2018, along with "Can't Dance". Both songs were intended to be part of Trainor's third major-label studio album Treat Myself (2020), but did not make it to the final cut. Lyrically, the midtempo throwback disco and pop song sees Trainor trying to reach a compromise with a feuding lover.

"Let You Be Right" peaked at number 18 on the US Billboard Adult Top 40 and at number 28 on the US Billboard Mainstream Top 40. Colin Tilley directed the music video for "Let You Be Right". Released on June 4, 2018, the video features Trainor performing choreography with a group of female dancers at a basketball court. The video featured the singer wearing a pair of "silky, ballooning black trousers" and made use of kaleidoscopic effects. In 2018, Trainor performed the song on The Today Show's Citi concert series, The Late Show with Stephen Colbert, 2018 Teen Choice Awards, 2018 Radio Disney Music Awards and CMT Crossroads.

== Background and release ==
Trainor had been searching for a producer to create her upcoming third major-label studio album Treat Myself (2020) with, when she conducted the first session for it with songwriter Jacob Kasher Hindlin. He suggested that they work with then-unknown producer Andrew Wells. Trainor, who was expecting the session to go "really bad or really awesome", ended up writing "Let You Be Right" with them, and knew Wells "was the one". Wells produced the song, and ended up collaborating with Trainor on four songs for her second EP, The Love Train (2019), two of which were co-written by Hindlin. "Let You Be Right" was Wells' favorite song on the original iteration of Treat Myself, and he suggested that the singer release the song.

Trainor previewed the song on her Instagram account, accompanied by a video of a spinning disco ball, on May 8, 2018, two days before the official release date. It was released on May 10, 2018, accompanied by "Can't Dance". About her decision to release two singles on the same day, Trainor said "My team and I talked about it, and I just can't wait any longer to share the songs on this album. I wanted to drop two today instead of one." In the United States, "Let You Be Right" was serviced to adult contemporary radio on May 11 and contemporary hit radio on June 8, 2018.

In a January 2020 interview, Trainor was regretful about releasing the song as a single, stating that her label, management and team were "really confident" in it, and radio DJs were telling them it was the only song off Treat Myself that "[would] work". So she agreed: "Alright, I'll do what you all want to do", but concluded "that shit was wrong" following its commercial underperformance. As Trainor rewrote the album four times, to make it a pop record that feels relevant in an era when hip-hop reigns, "Let You Be Right" failed to make the final cut.

== Composition and reception ==
"Let You Be Right" (2018)
A 17-second sample of "Let You Be Right", described as a "bright, bass-thumping" love song.

"Let You Be Right" is a pop song that visits the "heady days" of disco. First dubbed as a "make-up anthem", the song finds Trainor delivering "fun" and "flirty" lyrics as she tries to reach a compromise with a feuding lover. It has been described as a retro and disco tinged midtempo throwback song with "sugary" production, with a "bright, breezy" chorus. It is a "bright, bass-thumping" love song, with elements of funk. Trainor's vocals on the song are sung with an "inviting coo", and the song's bass line has been described as "intoxicatingly wiggly". The song's guitar instrumentation received comparisons to the work of Nile Rodgers.

"Let You Be Right" peaked at number 15 on the Belgium Ultratip Flanders chart, and at number 41 on the Canada Billboard AC chart. It reached numbers 31 and 21 on the Canada CHR/Top 40 and Hot AC charts respectively. The song also peaked at number 18 on the US Billboard Adult Top 40 and at number 28 on the US Billboard Mainstream Top 40.

== Music video ==
Colin Tilley, who previously collaborated with Trainor on her video for "No Excuses" (2018), directed the music video for "Let You Be Right". It was released on June 4, 2018, almost a month after the release of the single. The music video was shot at the Moonlight Rollerway in Glendale. It incorporated an "eye-popping" backdrop and laser lights. Trainor's outfits for the video include a white leotard, "Baby Spice-esque" pigtails, bubblegum pink hair, and parachute pants.

In the video, Trainor performs a high-energy dance routine on a basketball court in "sporty" attire. One of the props used in the video is a disco ball, and inclusion of kaleidoscopic effects. The singer opined that it was "[her] best video yet", and featured some looks that she came up with herself and some that were inspired by Pinterest. A critic described it as an "explosion of looks, lasers and choreography".

== Live performances ==
In 2018, Trainor performed "Let You Be Right" as part of her setlist on The Today Show's Citi concert series, as well as The Late Show with Stephen Colbert. She also performed it at the 2018 Teen Choice Awards in August 2018. Trainor opened the 2018 Radio Disney Music Awards with a medley of "Let You Be Right", "No Excuses", "Can't Dance" (2018), "Me Too" (2016) and "All About That Bass" (2014). She performed it with Brett Eldredge at an episode of CMT Crossroads, and included a stripped-down and "more relaxed" version of it on her Spotify Singles EP.

== Personnel ==
Credits adapted from Tidal.

- Andrew Wells – producer, songwriter, engineer
- Meghan Trainor – lead vocals, songwriter
- Jacob Kasher – songwriter
- Bo Bodnar – engineer
- Matt Wolach – engineer
- Mitch McCarthy – mixing engineer
- Randy Merrill – mastering engineer

== Charts ==
Chart (2018)	Peak position
Belgium (Ultratip Bubbling Under Flanders)	15
Canada AC (Billboard)	41
Canada CHR/Top 40 (Billboard)	31
Canada Hot AC (Billboard)	21
US Adult Pop Airplay (Billboard)	18
US Pop Airplay (Billboard)	28

== Release history ==
Region	Date	Format	Label	Ref.
Various	May 10, 2018	Digital download	Epic	
United States	May 11, 2018	Adult contemporary radio	Epic	
United States	June 8, 2018	Contemporary hit radio	Epic	
