= The Vultures (band) =

- Origin: London, England
- Genres: Alternative
- Years active: 2013–present
- Labels: Ciao Ketchup
- Website: thevultures.co.uk

The Vultures are a London-based band, with band members originally from London, Quebec, Taiwan, Valencia, Japan and Newcastle, formed in 2013. They won Best Alternative Act on the Exposure Music Awards 2013/2014.
