= The Love Train =

2019 EP by Meghan Trainor

- Original cover artwork

EP by Meghan Trainor
- Released: February 8, 2019
- Genre: Dance-pop; R&B
- Length: 19:58
- Label: Epic
- Producer: Andrew Wells; Chris Gelbuda; Tyler Johnson; Meghan Trainor

Meghan Trainor chronology
Thank You (2016)	The Love Train (2019)	Treat Myself (2020)

Alternative cover
- 2021 re-issue cover art

Singles from The Love Train
- 1. "All the Ways" Released: February 11, 2019

The Love Train is the second extended play (EP) by the American singer-songwriter Meghan Trainor. It was released by Epic Records on February 8, 2019. All of the material on the EP was produced by Andrew Wells, Chris Gelbuda, Tyler Johnson and Trainor. Critics described the lyrics as romantic as they were inspired by Trainor's marriage to Daryl Sabara.

"All the Ways" was released to radio as the lead single of The Love Train on February 11, 2019. Trainor described the EP as a predecessor to her then upcoming third major-label studio album, Treat Myself. It peaked at number 10 on the US Digital Albums chart and number 37 on the US Top Album Sales chart.

== Background and composition ==
Trainor initially announced that her third major-label studio album, Treat Myself, would be released on August 31, 2018. However, it was delayed to January 25, 2019, and removed from iTunes that month. On February 4, 2019, Trainor announced the release of an EP, called The Love Train, which she described as a teaser for Treat Myself. A dance-pop and R&B EP, The Love Train was inspired by Trainor's marriage with Daryl Sabara. Epic reissued the EP with three additional tracks on February 12, 2021, with the AJ Mitchell duet version of the track "After You", that was available on her third studio album Treat Myself, and "Throwback Love" and "Goosebumps" from the Target deluxe edition of her second studio album Thank You (2016).

The opener and lead single, "All the Ways" is a love song, inspired by the work of ABBA. Mike Wass of Idolator described the song as having "cute synths" and a "pure-pop sensibility". "Marry Me" is a ukulele-driven song about Trainor's desire to make things official with her significant other. Trainor said that she wrote the song in a hotel room with Sabara. "I'm Down" has been described as a "dancefloor" anthem with a "big" chorus. "After You" is a piano ballad that sees the singer pleading for her lover to stay by her side. Wass described "Foolish" as having "frantic beats"; lyrics include "They say that fools rush in. But I, oh I, I wanna be foolish with you". "Good Mornin'" is an "atmospheric" song featuring Trainor's father playing the organ.

== Promotion ==
Several music videos were released to promote The Love Train, one per day during a week. On February 10, 2019, a music video for "I'm Down" was uploaded to Trainor's YouTube account. One day later, the music video for "Foolish" was released. It was edited by her brother Ryan Trainor and features footage from Meghan and Sabara's wedding reception. On February 12, the music video for "After You", directed by Charm La'Donna, was released. It features dancers Kaycee Rice and Sean Lew. On the following day, the music video for "Good Mornin'" was released. It was directed by Baxter Stapleton and also featured two dancers. On February 14, the music video for "Marry Me" was released. Created by Toon53 Productions, it also featured Trainor's wedding footage. One day later, the music video for "All the Ways" was released. Directed by Brian Petchers, it stars Bailee Madison. The Love Train was also promoted through a press release, which drew controversy because of its "graphic nature and bizarre phrasing", with sexually ambiguous terms such as "wet", "junk" and "bangin'" being used, according to Andrew Trendell of NME.

"All the Ways", which was initially released as a promotional single for Treat Myself on June 20, 2018, was serviced to hot adult contemporary radio as the lead single from the EP on February 11, 2019, after Epic announced the album was delayed. Described as "fun" and "danceable" by Billboard, the song was originally used in a 2018 Target marketing campaign. It peaked at number 16 on the US Adult Top 40 chart. Upon release, The Love Train peaked at number 10 on the US Digital Albums chart and number 37 on Top Album Sales.

== Critical reception ==
Professional ratings
Review scores
Source	Rating
AllMusic	2.5/5 stars

Idolator author Mike Wass described the EP as "overflowing with lush production and endearing sentiment" and "a major success". Radio.com's Kyle McCann wrote that the EP "gives fans a few bops to vibe to", and added "we're feelin' each of the six songs". In a mixed review, Stephen Thomas Erlewine of AllMusic called The Love Train a "breezy stopgap EP", further describing it as a "celebration of romance" coming from Trainor, "who had reason to extol the virtues of love". He added that the press release was "ridiculously overheated" and "carnal," also stating that the EP is "heavy on soaring ballads and persistent dance-pop that don't quite fit into the trends of the late 2010s."

== Track listing ==
Standard edition
No.	Title	Writer(s)	Producer	Length
1.	"All the Ways"	Meghan Trainor; Andrew Wells; Jacob Kasher Hindlin	Wells	2:55
2.	"Marry Me"	Trainor	Chris Gelbuda	3:36
3.	"I'm Down"	Trainor; Wells; Tyler Johnson; Joshua Kear	Wells	3:16
4.	"After You"	Trainor; Johnson; Anders Mouridsen	Johnson	3:26
5.	"Foolish"	Trainor; Wells; Hindlin; Gamal Lewis	Wells	3:19
6.	"Good Mornin'" (featuring Gary Trainor)	Trainor; Wells; Daryl Sabara	Wells; Trainor	3:26
Total length:				19:58

Digital reissue
No.	Title	Writer(s)	Producer	Length
7.	"After You" (featuring AJ Mitchell)	Trainor; Johnson; Mouridsen; Justin Trainor	Johnson	3:26
8.	"Throwback Love"	Trainor; Kevin Kadish	Ricky Reed; Kadish	3:13
9.	"Goosebumps"	Trainor; Eric Frederic; Gamal Lewis; Eric Tobias Wincorn; Joe Spargur; Robert Riley; Charles White; Billy Ball	Reed	3:41

=== Notes ===
- All track titles are stylized in all caps.
- The Love Train's reissue was initially released with the solo version of "After You" missing from the track list, and some digital platforms displaying the original 2019 album artwork instead of the re-issued one. Both of these issues were corrected in subsequent re-uploads to digital music platforms.

== Personnel ==
Credits are adapted from the liner notes.

- Meghan Trainor – songwriting (1–6), lead vocals, production (1–3, 5–6), percussion (6), backing vocals (1–3, 5–6)
- Andrew Wells – songwriting (1, 5–6), production (1, 3, 5–6), engineering (1, 3, 5–6), bass (1, 3, 5–6), guitar (1, 3, 5–6), synthesizer (1, 3, 5–6), programming (1)
- Jacob Kasher Hindlin – songwriting (1, 5)
- Chris Gelbuda – production (2), acoustic guitar (2), engineering (2), ukulele (2), backing vocals (2)
- Tyler Johnson – songwriting (3–4), production (4), keyboards (4), piano (4), recording engineer (4), backing vocals (3), programming (4)
- Joshua Kear – songwriting (3), backing vocals (3)
- Anders Mouridsen – songwriting (4), guitar (4), piano (4)
- Gamal Lewis – songwriting (5)
- Daryl Sabara – songwriting (6), percussion (6), backing vocals (1, 5, 6)
- John Hanes – engineering
- Bo Bodnar – engineering (1, 3–6), percussion (6), backing vocals (1, 3, 6)
- Randy Merrill – mastering
- Şerban Ghenea – mixing (1, 3–6)
- John Whitt, Jr. – synthesizer (1)
- Mitch McCarthy – mixing (2)
- Greg Magers – recording engineer (2)
- Rob Humphries – drums (3)
- Dan Higgins – saxophone (3)
- Drew Taubenfeld – guitar (5)
- Gary Trainor – organ (6), percussion (6), piano (6), featured artist (6), backing vocals (6)
- Ryan Trainor – percussion, backing vocals (1)
- Kelli Trainor – percussion (6), backing vocals (1, 6)
- Kameron Alexander – percussion (6), backing vocals (6)
- Nick Lobel – programming (4)
- The Vultures – production (4), band leader (4)

== Charts ==
Chart performance
Chart (2019)	Peak position
US Digital Albums (Billboard)	10
US Top Album Sales (Billboard)	37

== Release history ==
Release dates and formats
Region	Date	Format	Label	Ref.
United States	February 8, 2019	Digital download; streaming	Epic	
United States	February 12, 2021	Digital download; streaming; (re-issue)	Epic	
