= Hailee Steinfeld discography =

Discography of American female singer

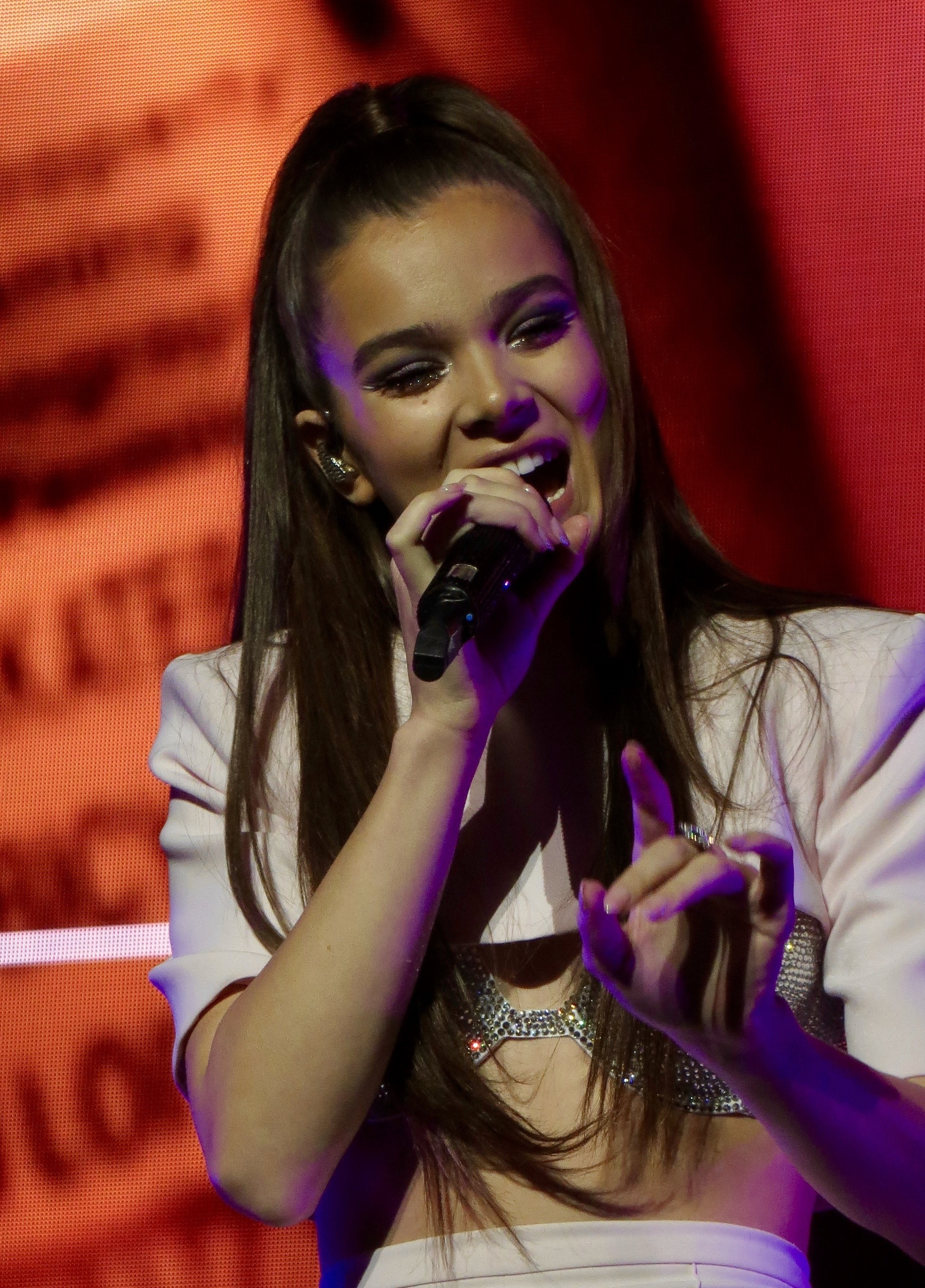
- Steinfeld performing "Love Myself" at Katy Perry's Witness: The Tour in 2018
- EPs: 2
- Singles: 21
- Music videos: 12
- Promotional singles: 3

American actress and singer Hailee Steinfeld has released two extended plays, twenty singles (including nine as a featured artist), three promotional singles and has made other album appearances. Steinfeld gained recognition for her music after performing "Flashlight" in Pitch Perfect 2 (2015).

Steinfeld's debut extended play, Haiz, was released on November 13, 2015, by Republic Records. The lead single, "Love Myself" found commercial success peaking at number 30 on the Billboard Hot 100 and number 15 on the Billboard Pop Songs chart, marking the highest debut for a solo female artist on the chart in 17 years since Natalie Imbruglia's "Torn" in 1998. (Note: As attributed by sources published by Billboard.) Haiz was re-released twice in 2016. With the first re-release, a new version of "Rock Bottom" with DNCE was released as the second single and reached number 33 on the Pop Songs chart. With the second re-release, Steinfeld also added "Starving" which found commercial and critical success and reached number 12 on the Hot 100.

Following 2016, Steinfeld made appearances on multiple soundtracks including "Capital Letters" from Fifty Shades Freed (2018), "Back to Life" from Bumblebee (2018) and "Afterlife" from Dickinson (2019). She also released a string of successful singles in 2017 which included "Most Girls" and "Let Me Go" reaching number 58 and 40 on the Hot 100 respectively. In 2020, Steinfeld released her second extended play, Half Written Story which was supported by the singles "Wrong Direction" and "I Love You's". This was followed by various standalone singles including "Coast".

== Extended plays ==
Title	Details	Peak chart positions				Certifications
Title	Details	US	CAN	JPN	UK	Certifications
Haiz (Note: Haiz was re-released twice in 2016, first on February 26 with a remix of "Rock Bottom", then on July 15 with four extra songs and three additional remixes.)	Released: November 13, 2015; Format: CD, digital download; Label: Republic	57	38	76	—	BPI: Silver
Half Written Story	Released: May 8, 2020; Format: Digital download, streaming; Label: Republic	— (Note: Half Written Story did not enter the US Billboard 200 but peaked at number 3 on the US Heatseekers Albums chart.)	—	—	— (Note: Half Written Story did not enter the UK Albums Chart but peaked at number 97 on the UK Album Downloads Chart.)	
"—" denotes releases that did not chart or were not released in that territory.

== Singles ==
=== As lead artist ===
List of singles, with selected chart positions and certifications
Title	Year	Peak chart positions										Certifications	Album
Title	Year	US	US Pop	AUS	CAN	DEN	ITA	NOR	NZ	SWE	UK	Certifications	Album
"Love Myself"	2015	30	15	92	15	36	50	20	19	35	180	RIAA: 2× Platinum; BPI: Platinum; FIMI: Platinum; GLF: Platinum; IFPI DEN: Platinum; MC: 2× Platinum; RMNZ: 2× Platinum	Haiz
"Rock Bottom" (Note: The new version of "Rock Bottom" featuring DNCE was added in the first re-release of Haiz in 2016.) (featuring DNCE)	2016	— (Note: "Rock Bottom" did not enter the Billboard Hot 100, but peaked at number 3 on the Bubbling Under Hot 100 Singles chart.)	33	39	61	—	—	—	— (Note: "Rock Bottom" did not enter the NZ Top 40 Singles Chart, but peaked at number 3 on the NZ Heatseekers chart.)	—	—	RIAA: Platinum; ARIA: Platinum; BPI: Silver; MC: Gold; RMNZ: Platinum	Haiz
"Starving" (Note: "Starving" is only included in the second re-release of Haiz.) (with Grey featuring Zedd)	2016	12	5	5	9	8	39	11	5	15	5	RIAA: 4× Platinum; ARIA: 2× Platinum; BPI: 2× Platinum; FIMI: 2× Platinum; GLF: Platinum; IFPI DEN: 2× Platinum; MC: 4× Platinum; RMNZ: 5× Platinum	Haiz
"Most Girls"	2017	58	26	18	42	—	—	—	38	— (Note: "Most Girls" did not enter the Swedish Singles Chart, but peaked at number 13 on the Heatseeeker chart.)	34	RIAA: 2× Platinum; ARIA: Platinum; BPI: Platinum; FIMI: Gold; IFPI DEN: Gold; MC: Platinum; RMNZ: 2× Platinum	Non-album singles
"Let Me Go" (with Alesso featuring Florida Georgia Line and Watt)	2017	40	14	12	18	—	69	40	14	35	30	RIAA: Platinum; ARIA: 5× Platinum; BPI: Platinum; FIMI: Platinum; GLF: 2× Platinum; IFPI DEN: Gold; MC: 4× Platinum; RMNZ: 4× Platinum	Non-album singles
"Capital Letters" (with BloodPop)	2018	— (Note: "Capital Letters" did not enter the Billboard Hot 100, but peaked at number 12 on the Bubbling Under Hot 100 Singles chart.)	—	32	69	34	—	17	— (Note: "Capital Letters" did not enter the NZ Top 40 Singles Chart, but peaked at number eight on the NZ Heatseeker Singles Chart.)	42	39	ARIA: 2× Platinum; BPI: Gold; FIMI: Gold; IFPI DEN: Gold; MC: Platinum; RMNZ: Platinum	Fifty Shades Freed
"Back to Life"	2018	—	—	—	—	—	—	—	—	—	—		Bumblebee
"Afterlife"	2019	— (Note: "Afterlife" did not enter the Billboard Hot 100, but peaked at number 43 on the Digital Song Sales chart.)	— (Note: "Afterlife" did not enter the Mainstream Top 40, but peaked at number 20 on the Pop Digital Song Sales chart.)	—	— (Note: "Afterlife" did not enter the Canadian Singles Chart, but peaked at number 48 on the Canadian Digital Songs chart.)	—	—	—	— (Note: "Afterlife" did not enter the NZ Top 40 Singles Chart, but peaked at number seven on the NZ Hot Singles Chart.)	—	—		Non-album single
"Wrong Direction"	2020	—	—	—	— (Note: "Wrong Direction" did not enter the Canadian Singles Chart, but peaked at number 28 on the Canadian Digital Songs chart.)	—	—	—	— (Note: "Wrong Direction" did not enter the NZ Top 40 Singles Chart, but peaked at number nine on the NZ Hot Singles Chart.)	—	—	MC: Gold	Half Written Story
"I Love You's"	2020	— (Note: "I Love You's" did not enter the Billboard Hot 100, but peaked at number 48 on the Digital Song Sales chart.)	—	—	—	—	—	—	— (Note: "I Love You's" did not enter the NZ Top 40 Singles Chart, but peaked at number 14 on the NZ Hot Singles Chart.)	—	—	RMNZ: Gold	Half Written Story
"Coast" (featuring Anderson .Paak)	2022	—	—	—	—	—	—	—	— (Note: "Coast" did not enter the NZ Top 40 Singles Chart, but peaked at number five on the NZ Hot Singles Chart.)	—	—	RMNZ: Gold	Non-album singles
"SunKissing"	2023	—	—	—	—	—	—	—	— (Note: "SunKissing" did not enter the NZ Top 40 Singles Chart, but peaked at number 27 on the NZ Hot Singles Chart.)	—	—		Non-album singles
"Magic"	2026	—	—	—	—	—	—	—	—	—	—		Non-album singles
"—" denotes releases that did not chart or were not released in that territory.

=== As featured artist ===
List of singles as featured artist, with selected chart positions
Title	Year	Peak chart positions								Certifications	Album
Title	Year	US	US Dance Digital	US Pop	AUS	CAN	NZ	SWE Heat.	UK	Certifications	Album
"How I Want Ya" (Hudson Thames featuring Hailee Steinfeld)	2015	—	—	—	—	—	—	—	—		Lip Tricks
"Fragile" (Prince Fox featuring Hailee Steinfeld)	2016	—	35	—	—	—	—	—	—		Haiz
"Digital Love" (Digital Farm Animals featuring Hailee Steinfeld)	2017	—	—	—	—	—	—	—	— (Note: "Digital Love" did not enter the UK singles chart, but peaked at number 33 on the UK Dance Singles and Albums Chart.)		Non-album singles
"Show You Love" (Kato and Sigala featuring Hailee Steinfeld)	2017	—	—	—	—	—	—	—	91	BPI: Silver; IFPI DEN: Gold	Non-album singles
"At My Best" (Machine Gun Kelly featuring Hailee Steinfeld)	2017	60	—	21	87	66	— (Note: "At My Best" did not enter the NZ Top 40 Singles Chart, but peaked at number four on the NZ Heatseekers Singles Chart.)	2	—	RIAA: Platinum; RMNZ: Gold	Bloom
"Colour" (MNEK featuring Hailee Steinfeld)	2018	—	—	—	—	—	—	—	92		Language
"Woke Up Late" (Drax Project featuring Hailee Steinfeld)	2019	—	—	29	18	—	35	—	—	ARIA: 6× Platinum	Drax Project
"Times Like These" (as part of Live Lounge Allstars)	2020	— (Note: "Times Like These" did not enter the Billboard Hot 100, but peaked at number 18 on the Digital Song Sales chart.)	—	—	—	— (Note: "Times Like These" did not enter the Canadian Singles Chart, but peaked at number 8 on the Canadian Digital Songs chart.)	— (Note: "Times Like These" did not enter the NZ Top 40 Singles Chart, but peaked at number 5 on the NZ Hot Singles Chart.)	—	1	BPI: Silver	Non-album single
"—" denotes releases that did not chart or were not released in that territory.

=== Promotional singles ===
List of promotional singles
Title	Year	Certification	Album
"You're Such A"	2015	RMNZ: Gold	Haiz
"Santa Claus Is Coming to Town" (DNCE featuring Charlie Puth, Hailee Steinfeld, Daya, Fifth Harmony, Rita Ora, Tinashe, Sabrina Carpenter and Jake Miller)	2016		Non-album promotional single
"Plot Twist" (Remix) (Marc E. Bassy featuring Hailee Steinfeld)	2017		Gossip Columns

== Other charted and certified songs ==
Title	Year	Peak chart positions	Certifications	Album
Title	Year	NZ Hot	Certifications	Album
"Flashlight" (Sweet Life Mix)	2015	—	RMNZ: Gold	Pitch Perfect 2
"Ordinary Day" (Logic featuring Hailee Steinfeld)	2018	20		YSIV
"End This (L.O.V.E.)"	2020	27		Half Written Story
"—" denotes releases that did not chart or were not released in that territory.

== Other appearances ==
List of guest appearances, with other performing artists
Title	Year	Other performer(s)	Album	Ref.
"Tell Me If You Wanna Go Home" (Roof Top Mix)	2014	Keira Knightley	Begin Again	
"Kennedy Center Performance"	2015	The Barden Bellas	Pitch Perfect 2	
"Riff Off"	2015	The Barden Bellas	Pitch Perfect 2	
"Convention Performance"	2015	The Barden Bellas	Pitch Perfect 2	
"Back to Basics"	2015	The Barden Bellas	Pitch Perfect 2	
"Cups ("When I'm Gone")"	2015	The Barden Bellas	Pitch Perfect 2	
"World Championship Finale 2"	2015	The Barden Bellas	Pitch Perfect 2	
"Jungle"	2015	The Barden Bellas	Pitch Perfect 2	
"Toxic"	2017	The Bellas	Pitch Perfect 3	
"Sit Still, Look Pretty"	2017	The New Barden Bellas	Pitch Perfect 3	
"Riff Off"	2017	The Bellas	Pitch Perfect 3	
"Cheap Thrills"	2017	The Bellas	Pitch Perfect 3	
"I Don't Like It, I Love It"	2017	The Bellas	Pitch Perfect 3	
"Cake by the Ocean"	2017	The Bellas	Pitch Perfect 3	
"Freedom! '90"	2017	The Bellas	Pitch Perfect 3	
"Freedom! '90 / Cups"	2017	The Bellas, The Voice Season 13 Top 12 Contestants	Pitch Perfect 3	
"Dance With Me"	2018	Chic	It's About Time	
"Love On Top"	2020	The Bellas	Non-album appearance	
"Masterpiece"	2020	Chen Linong	Incompatible (格格不入)	
"Dangerous"	2025	—	Sinners (Original Motion Picture Soundtrack)	
"Magic"	2026	—	Hexed	

== Music videos ==
List of music videos, showing year released and directors
Title	Year	Other artist(s)	Director(s)	Ref.
As lead artist
"Love Myself"	2015	None	Hannah Lux Davis	
"Rock Bottom"	2016	DNCE	Malia James	
"Starving"	2016	Zedd; Grey	Hannah Lux Davis	
"Most Girls"	2017	None	Hannah Lux Davis	
"Let Me Go"	2017	Alesso; Florida Georgia Line; Watt	Emil Nava	
"Let Me Go (Personal Collection)"	2017	Alesso; Florida Georgia Line; Watt	Erik Lauer	
"Capital Letters"	2018	BloodPop	Hannah Lux Davis	
"Afterlife"	2019	None	Hannah Lux Davis	
"Wrong Direction"	2020	None	Alexandre Moors	
"I Love You's"	2020	None	Hailee Steinfeld; Sarah McColgan	
"Afterlife (For Your Consideration)"	2020	None	None	
"Coast"	2022	Anderson .Paak	Anderson .Paak	
As featured artist
"Stitches"	2015	Shawn Mendes	None	
"At My Best"	2017	Machine Gun Kelly	Hannah Lux Davis	
"Freedom' 90!" / "Cups"	2017	The Bellas; The Voice Season 13 Top 12 Contestants	None	
"Colour"	2018	MNEK	Bradley & Pablo	
"Woke Up Late" (Remix)	2019	Drax Project	Jonathan Singer-Vine	
"Times Like These"	2020	Live Lounge Allstars	None	
"Love On Top"	2020	The Bellas	None	
Guest appearances
"Endlessly"	2012	The Cab	Elliott Sellers	
"Bad Blood"	2015	Taylor Swift; Kendrick Lamar	Joseph Kahn	
"Sing"	2015	Pentatonix	Christian Lamb	
"Earth"	2019	Lil Dicky	Nigel W. Tierney; Federico Heller	
"Graduation"	2019	Benny Blanco; Juice Wrld	Jake Schreier	
