= List of awards and nominations received by Hailee Steinfeld =

Hailee Steinfeld awards and nominations
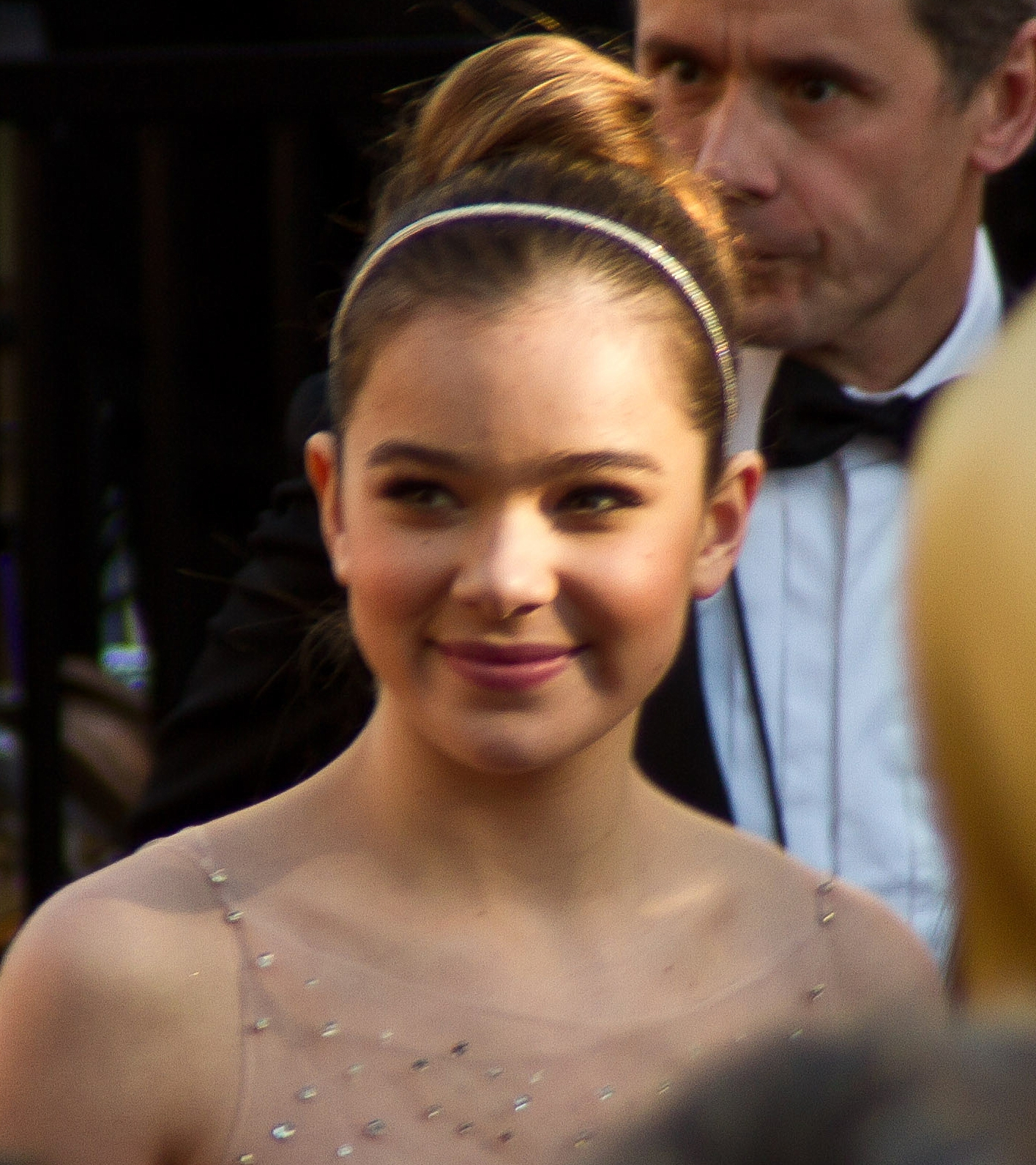
- Steinfeld at the 83rd Academy Awards in 2011
Awards and nominations
Award	Wins	Nominations

Totals (Note: Certain award groups do not simply award one winner. They acknowledge several different recipients, have runners-up, and have third place. Since this is a specific recognition and is different from losing an award, runner-up mentions are considered wins in this award tally. For simplification and to avoid errors, each award in this list has been presumed to have had a prior nomination.)
- Wins: 32
- Nominations: 87

Hailee Steinfeld is an American actress and singer who has received numerous awards and nominations. Her most major ones include nominations for an Academy Award, a BAFTA Award, a Golden Globe Award and a SAG Award.

After starring in multiple short films, Steinfeld's breakout role came in the acclaimed Coen brothers film, True Grit. For her performance she received critical acclaim and an Academy Award for Best Supporting Actress nomination, making her the ninth youngest nominee in the category. She also received nominations for a BAFTA Award for Best Actress, a SAG Award and a Critics' Choice Movie Award for Best Supporting Actress, as well as winning a Chicago Film Critics Association Award, a Houston Film Critics Society Award and a Critics' Choice Movie Award for Best Young Performer.

Steinfeld also gained recognition for her performances in The Homesman (2014) and Pitch Perfect 2 (2015). The former earned her a nomination for the Women Film Critics Circle award for Best Ensemble, while the latter garnered her a Teen Choice Award nomination. The following year, Steinfeld starred in the teen drama film, The Edge of Seventeen (2016), for which she received a nomination for the Golden Globe Award for Best Actress – Motion Picture Comedy or Musical, as well as nomination for two Critics' Choice Awards. For her performance in Bumblebee she was nominated for a Saturn Award, and for her voice work in Spider-Man: Into the Spider-Verse she was nominated for the Alliance of Women Film Journalists award for best animated female and later won for the same character in Spider-Man: Across the Spider-Verse. In 2019, Steinfeld received a Peabody Award for Entertainment for her work in the Apple TV+ television series Dickinson.

== Major associations ==
=== Academy Awards ===
The Academy Awards are a set of awards given by the Academy of Motion Picture Arts and Sciences annually for excellence of cinematic achievements.

Year	Nominated work	Category	Result	Ref.
2011	True Grit	Best Supporting Actress	Nominated	

=== British Academy Film and Television Arts Awards ===
The BAFTA Award is an annual award show presented by the British Academy of Film and Television Arts.

Year	Nominated work	Category	Result	Ref.
2011	True Grit	Best Actress in a Leading Role	Nominated	

=== Critics' Choice Awards ===
The Critics' Choice Awards are presented annually by the BFCA for outstanding achievements in the cinema, documentary and TV industries.

Year	Nominated work	Category	Result	Ref.
2011	True Grit	Best Supporting Actress	Nominated	
2011	True Grit	Best Young Performer	Won	
2016	The Edge of Seventeen	Best Young Performer	Nominated	
2016	The Edge of Seventeen	Best Actress in a Comedy	Nominated	

=== Golden Globe Awards ===
The Golden Globe Award is an accolade bestowed by the 93 members of the Hollywood Foreign Press Association (HFPA) recognizing excellence in film and television, both domestic and foreign.

Year	Nominated work	Category	Result	Ref.
2016	The Edge of Seventeen	Best Actress – Musical or Comedy	Nominated	

=== Actor Awards ===
The Actor Awards are organized by the Screen Actors Guild‐American Federation of Television and Radio Artists. First awarded in 1995, the awards aim to recognize excellent achievements by actors in film and television.

Year	Nominated work	Category	Result	Ref.
2011	True Grit	Outstanding Performance by a Female Actor in a Supporting Role	Nominated	
2026	Sinners	Outstanding Performance by a Cast in a Motion Picture	Won	

== Industry awards ==
Name of the award, year the award was awarded, nominated work, category and result
Award	Year (Note: Indicates the year of ceremony. Each year is linked to the article about the awards held that year, wherever possible.)	Nominated work	Category	Result	Ref.
Astra Film Awards	2023	Spider-Man: Across the Spider-Verse	Best Voice-Over Performance	Won	
Astra Film Awards	2026	Sinners	Best Supporting Actress – Drama	Nominated	
Astra Midseason Movie Awards	2025	Sinners	Best Supporting Actress	Won	
Behind the Voice Actor Awards	2014	When Marnie Was There	Best Female Lead Vocal Performance in an Anime Feature Film/Special	Nominated	
Behind the Voice Actor Awards	2014	When Marnie Was There	Best Vocal Ensemble in an Anime Feature Film/Special	Nominated	
Billboard Music Awards	2017	Herself	Top Covered Artist	Won	
Critics' Choice Super Awards	2022	Hawkeye	Best Actress in a Superhero Series	Nominated	
Critics' Choice Super Awards	2024	Spider-Man: Across the Spider-Verse	Best Actress in a Superhero Movie	Nominated	
Empire Awards	2012	True Grit	Best Female Newcomer	Nominated	
GLAAD Media Awards	2020	Dickinson	Outstanding Comedy Series	Nominated	
GLAAD Media Awards	2022	Dickinson	Outstanding Comedy Series	Nominated	
Gotham Independent Film Awards	2025	Sinners	Ensemble Tribute Award	Won	
Hollywood Critics Association TV Awards	2021	Dickinson	Best Actress in a Streaming Series, Comedy	Nominated	
Hollywood Critics Association TV Awards	2022	Hawkeye	Best Actress in a Streaming Series, Comedy	Nominated	
iHeartRadio Music Awards	2015	Herself	Biggest Triple Threat	Nominated	
Kids' Choice Awards	2017	Herself	Favorite New Artist	Nominated	
Kids' Choice Awards	2019	Spider-Man: Into the Spider-Verse	Favorite Female Voice from an Animated Movie	Nominated	
Kids' Choice Awards	2022	Hawkeye	Favorite Female TV Star (Family)	Nominated	
Kids' Choice Awards	2024	Spider-Man: Across the Spider-Verse	Favorite Female Voice from an Animated Movie	Nominated	
Max Mara	2013	Herself	Face of the Future	Won	
MTV Europe Music Award	2017	Herself	Best Push Act	Won	
MTV Europe Music Award	2018	Herself	Best Pop	Nominated	
MTV Europe Music Award	2019	Herself	Best World Stage Performance	Nominated	
MTV Movie & TV Awards	2011	True Grit	Best Breakthrough Performance	Nominated	
MTV Movie & TV Awards	2017	The Edge of Seventeen	Best Performance in a Movie	Nominated	
Peabody Awards	2019	Dickinson	Entertainment	Won	
Radio Disney Music Awards	2017	Herself	Breakout Artist Award	Nominated	
Radio Disney Music Awards	2017	"Starving"	Best Crush Song	Nominated	
Radio Disney Music Awards	2018	"Let Me Go"	Best Dance Track	Nominated	
Saturn Awards	2011	True Grit	Best Performance by a Younger Actor	Nominated	
Saturn Awards	2019	Bumblebee	Best Supporting Actress	Nominated	
Saturn Awards	2022	Hawkeye	Best Performance by a Younger Actor (Streaming)	Nominated	
Saturn Awards	2026	Sinners	Best Supporting Actress	Nominated	
Teen Choice Awards	2011	True Grit	Breakout Artist	Nominated	
Teen Choice Awards	2015	Pitch Perfect 2	Choice Move Scene Stealer	Nominated	
Teen Choice Awards	2017	Herself	Choice Music – Female Artist	Nominated	
Teen Choice Awards	2017	"Most Girls"	Choice Music – Single	Nominated	
Teen Choice Awards	2017	The Edge of Seventeen	Choice Movie Actress – Drama	Nominated	
Teen Choice Awards	2018	Pitch Perfect 3	Choice Movie Actress – Comedy	Nominated	
Teen Choice Awards	2019	Bumblebee	Choice Movie Actress – Action	Nominated	
Variety Hitmakers Awards	2017	Herself	Crossover Artist	Won	
Young Artist Awards	2011	True Grit	Best Performance in a Feature Film – Leading Young Actress	Won	

== Critics association ==
Year	Nominated work	Association	Category	Result	Ref.
2010	True Grit	Austin Film Critics Association	Best Supporting Actress	Won	
2010	True Grit	Central Ohio Film Critics Association	Best Supporting Actress	Won	
2010	True Grit	Chicago Film Critics Association	Best Supporting Actress	Won	
2010	True Grit	Chicago Film Critics Association	Most Promising Performer	Nominated	
2010	True Grit	Dallas-Fort Worth Film Critics Association	Best Supporting Actress	Nominated	
2010	True Grit	Houston Film Critics Society	Best Supporting Actress	Won	
2010	True Grit	Indiana Film Journalists Association	Best Supporting Actress	Won	
2010	True Grit	Kansas City Film Critics Circle	Best Supporting Actress	Won	
2010	True Grit	Las Vegas Film Critics Society	Youth in Film	Won	
2010	True Grit	Phoenix Film Critics Society	Best Young Female Performance	Won	
2010	True Grit	Santa Barbara International Film Festival	Virtuoso Award	Won	
2010	True Grit	Southeastern Film Critics Association	Best Supporting Actress	Won	
2010	True Grit	Toronto Film Critics Association	Best Supporting Actress	Won	
2010	True Grit	Vancouver Film Critics Circle	Best Supporting Actress	Won	
2010	True Grit	Washington D.C. Area Film Critics Association	Best Supporting Actress	Nominated	
2010	True Grit	Online Film and Television Association Awards	Best Youth Performance	Won	
2010	True Grit	Online Film and Television Association Awards	Breakthrough Performance: Female	Nominated	
2011	True Grit	Online Film Critics Society	Best Supporting Actress	Won	
2014	The Homesman	Women Film Critics Circle	Best Ensemble	Won	
2016	The Edge of Seventeen	Central Ohio Film Critics Association	Best Actress	Nominated	
2016	The Edge of Seventeen	Las Vegas Film Critics Society	Youth in Film	Nominated	
2016	The Edge of Seventeen	Washington D.C. Film Critics Association	Best Youth Performance	Nominated	
2016	The Edge of Seventeen	Women Film Critics Circle	Best Young Actress	Won	
2019	Spider-Man: Into the Spider-Verse	Alliance of Women Film Journalists	Best Animated Female	Nominated	
2023	Spider-Man: Across the Spider-Verse	Indiana Film Journalists Association	Best Vocal/Motion Capture Performance	Won	
2023	Spider-Man: Across the Spider-Verse	Women Film Critics Circle	Best Animated Female	Won	
2023	Spider-Man: Across the Spider-Verse	Washington D.C. Area Film Critics Association	Best Voice Performance	Nominated	
2023	Spider-Man: Across the Spider-Verse	North Carolina Film Critics Association	Best Vocal Performance in Animation or Mixed Media	Nominated	
2023	Spider-Man: Across the Spider-Verse	Alliance of Women Film Journalists	Best Animated Female	Won	
2023	Spider-Man: Across the Spider-Verse	Austin Film Critics Association	Best Voice Acting/Animated/Digital Performance	Nominated	
2023	Spider-Man: Across the Spider-Verse	Chicago Indie Critics	Sight Unseen Award	Nominated	
2023	Spider-Man: Across the Spider-Verse	Latino Entertainment Journalists Association	Voice or Motion Capture Performance	Nominated	
2023	Spider-Man: Across the Spider-Verse	Online Film & Television Association	Best Voice-Over Performance	Nominated	
2025	Sinners	Austin Film Critics Association	Best Ensemble	Won	
2025	Sinners	Chicago Indie Critics	Best Supporting Actress	Nominated	
2025	Sinners	Chicago Indie Critics	Best Ensemble Cast	Won	
2025	Sinners	Indiana Film Journalists Association	Best Ensemble	Won	
2025	Sinners	Michigan Movie Critics Guild	Best Supporting Actress	Nominated	
2025	Sinners	Michigan Movie Critics Guild	Best Ensemble Cast	Won	
2025	Sinners	New York Film Critics Online	Best Ensemble Cast	Won	
2025	Sinners	North Dakota Film Society	Best Ensemble	Won	
2025	Sinners	Philadelphia Film Critics Circle	Best Ensemble	Won	
2025	Sinners	St. Louis Film Critics Association Awards	Best Ensemble	Nominated	
2025	Sinners	Washington D.C. Area Film Critics Association	Best Ensemble	Won	
