= Most Girls =

Most Girls may refer to:

- "Most Girls" (Pink song), 2000
- "Most Girls" (Hailee Steinfeld song), 2017
