= She's a Fox =

American 2009 short film

- Directed by: Cameron Sawyer
- Written by: Cameron Sawyer
- Produced by: Ashley Zastrow; Kaitlin Walsh; Travis Morgan
- Starring: Jake Nutty; Hailee Steinfeld
- Cinematography: Jennifer Makhoul
- Edited by: Julia MacMullen
- Music by: Greg Neil
- Release date: July 26, 2009 (LA Shorts Fest)
- Running time: 18 minutes
- Country: United States
- Language: English
- Budget: $30,000

She's a Fox is a 2009 semi-autobiographical short film written and directed by Cameron Sawyer. It stars Jake Nutty and Academy Award nominee Hailee Steinfeld. The story follows sixth grader Cameron Sawyer as he pursues the most popular girl in his elementary school.

== Plot ==
Sixth grader Cameron Sawyer is a member of a gang of "bad boys" who constantly terrorize the other kids at their school. Though Cameron acts tough in front of his friends, he has a crush on Talia Alden, a classmate who has been dating a boy named Jake Magnum since second grade. After being ignored by Talia, Cameron decides to leave his gang and abandon his mullet in pursuit of Talia. After some time trying to get Talia to notice him, Cameron wins the school "Fun Run", beating Jake and gaining her attention.

At a party, Cameron is asked what he thinks of Talia. After praying to God for guidance, he finally says, "She's a fox". Talia and Cameron begin to date, and their first kiss is captured in a photo booth. One day Cameron, Talia, and their friends are running when they are ambushed by Cameron's old gang, led by his former best friend Mitch. The gang eggs Cameron and his friends. While he tries to stand up to Mitch, Cameron is immediately defeated.

After the confrontation, Talia breaks up with Cameron. He goes to her house to talk to her, but leaves when he finds her with Jake. The film ends with Cameron biking away while "Love Hurts" by Nazareth plays.

== Cast ==
- Jake Nutty as Cameron Sawyer
- Hailee Steinfeld as Talia Alden
- Anthony Matthew Scott as Mitch Fallin
- Troy Romzek as Jake Magnum
- Stephanie Drapeau as Mrs. Woodhouse
- Cameron Sawyer as Himself/Narrator
- Erin Sossamon as Amber McMillan
- Cristal Guel as School Kid

== Reception ==
She's a Fox was an Official Selection in numerous film festivals throughout the United States and internationally, most notably the Heartland Film Festival, Edinburgh International Film Festival, Cleveland International Film Festival and the Academy-accredited LA Shorts Fest. Received well by jurists and audiences alike, the film has received a number of awards.

Year	Film Festival	Location	Award/Selection
2009	LA Shorts Fest	Los Angeles, CA	Official Selection
2009	HATCHFest	Bozeman, MT	Official Selection
2009	Angelus Student Film Festival	Hollywood, CA	Semi Finalist – Live Action
2009	Bend Film Festival	Bend, OR	Official Selection
2009	Chapman University Showcase	Orange, CA	Showcase Selection
2009	Heartland Film Festival	Indianapolis, IN	Nominee, Crystal Heart Award
2009	Cucalorus Film Festival	Wilmington, NC	Official Selection
2009	Kerry Film Festival	Kerry, Ireland	Official Selection
2009	Asheville Film Festival	Asheville, NC	Official Selection
2009	Anchorage International Film Festival	Anchorage, AK	Official Selection
2010	Victoria Film Festival	Victoria, BC, Canada	Official Selection
2010	LDS Film Festival	Orem, UT	Official Selection
2010	Sedona International Film Festival	Sedona, AZ	Winner, Audience Choice – Best Short Film
2010	International Family Film Festival	Hollywood, CA	Winner, Best Student Comedy
2010	Phoenix Film Festival	Phoenix, AZ	Official Selection
2010	Cleveland International Film Festival	Cleveland, OH	Official Selection
2010	Film Independent's Cinema Lounge	Beverly Hills, CA	Official Selection
2010	Charleston International Film Festival	Cherleston, SC	Winner, Audience Choice – Best Short Comedy
2010	Kent Film Festival	Kent, CT	Official Selection
2010	Newport Beach Film Festival	Newport Beach, CA	Official Selection
2010	Fallbrook Film Festival	Fallbrook, CA	Official Selection
2010	Scottsdale Film Festival	Scottsdale, AZ	Official Selection
2010	Kansas City Filmmakers Jubilee	Kansas City, MO	Official Selection
2010	West Chester Film Festival	West Chester, PA	Official Selection
2010	Delray Beach Film Festival	Delary Beach, FL	Official Selection
2010	Hill Country Film Festival	Austin, TX	Official Selection
2010	Edinburgh International Film Festival	Edinburgh, Scotland	Official Selection
2010	Cannes Short Film Corner	Cannes, France	Official Selection
2010	Little Rock Film Festival	Little Rock, AR	Official Selection
2010	Provincetown International Film Festival	Provincetown, MA	Grand Prize Winner, Student Competition; Best Student Film
2010	Rehoboth Beach Film Festival	Rehoboth Beach, DE	Official Selection
2010	Port Townsend Film Festival	Port Townsend, WA	Official Selection
2010	International Student Film Festival Hollywood	Hollywood, CA	Winner, Best Children Comedy
2010	Ojai Film Festival	Ojai, CA	Official Selection
2010	Temecula Valley International Film Festival	Temecula, CA	Official Selection
2010	Best of the Best Film Festival	Brigham City, UT	Official Selection
2010	Red Rock Film Festival	Zion Canyon, UT	Official Selection
2011	Sacramento International Film Festival	Sacramento, CA	Winner, Jury Award – Best Student Film
2011	Pune International Film Festival	Pune, India	Winner, Jury Award – Best Film, Live Action (Short Film)
2011	The Dam Short Film Festival	Boulder City, NV	Official Selection
2011	Siouxland Film Festival	Sioux City, IA	Official Selection
2011	Tallahassee Film Festival	Tallahassee, FL	Official Selection
2011	Lake Arrowhead Film Festival	Lake Arrowhead, CA	Official Selection
2011	IndieLisboa	Lisbon, Portugal	Official Selection

== Awards ==
Year	Film Festival	Location	Award
2009	Angelus Student Film Festival	Hollywood, CA	Semi Finalist – Live Action
2009	Heartland Film Festival	Indianapolis, IN	Nominee, Crystal Heart Award
2010	Sedona International Film Festival	Sedona, AZ	Winner, Audience Choice – Best Short Film
2010	International Family Film Festival	Hollywood, CA	Winner, Best Student Comedy
2010	Charleston International Film Festival	Cherleston, SC	Winner, Audience Choice – Best Short Comedy
2010	Provincetown International Film Festival	Provincetown, MA	Grand Prize Winner, Student Competition; Best Student Film
2010	International Student Film Festival Hollywood	Hollywood, CA	Winner, Best Children Comedy
2011	Sacramento International Film Festival	Sacramento, CA	Winner, Jury Award – Best Student Film
2011	Pune International Film Festival	Pune, India	Winner, Jury Award – Best Film, Live Action (Short Film)
