= Bumblebee (soundtrack) =

2018 soundtrack by various musical artists

Bumblebee (Motion Picture Soundtrack) is the soundtrack to the 2018 film of the same name directed by Travis Knight, the sixth installment in the Transformers film series. The soundtrack to the film consisted of several popular songs from the 1980s, which were released by Republic Records on the same day as the film's release, December 21, 2018. Bumblebee (Motion Picture Score), an album consisting of the film's original score composed by Dario Marianelli, was released by Paramount Music on the same date.

== Bumblebee (Motion Picture Soundtrack) ==
Bumblebee (Motion Picture Soundtrack)

Soundtrack album by various artists
- Released: December 21, 2018
- Genres: Rock; pop; R&B; EDM
- Length: 62:57
- Label: Republic

Singles from Bumblebee (Motion Picture Soundtrack)
- 1. "Back to Life" Released: November 2, 2018

=== Singles ===
Hailee Steinfeld performed the lead single "Back to Life" released on November 2, 2018. Two days later, she then performed the song live at 2018 MTV Europe Music Awards.

=== Track listing ===
No.	Title	Artist(s)	Length
1.	"Back to Life"	Hailee Steinfeld	3:53
2.	"Bigmouth Strikes Again"	The Smiths	3:15
3.	"Things Can Only Get Better"	Howard Jones	3:56
4.	"Runaway"	Bon Jovi	3:52
5.	"Save a Prayer"	Duran Duran	3:46
6.	"Higher Love"	Steve Winwood	5:49
7.	"Take On Me"	A-ha	3:48
8.	"Everybody Wants to Rule the World"	Tears for Fears	4:12
9.	"It Takes Two"	Rob Base & DJ E-Z Rock	5:01
10.	"The Touch"	Stan Bush	3:56
11.	"I Can't Wait"	Nu Shooz	3:38
12.	"I Can't Drive 55"	Sammy Hagar	4:12
13.	"Dance Hall Days"	Wang Chung	4:00
14.	"Girlfriend in a Coma"	The Smiths	2:04
15.	"Don't You (Forget About Me)"	Simple Minds	4:22
16.	"Back to Life (80s Remix)"	Hailee Steinfeld	3:13
Total length:			62:57

=== Chart performance ===
Weekly chart performance for Bumblebee (Motion Picture Soundtrack)
Chart (2021)	Peak position
UK Album Downloads (OCC)	79
UK Soundtrack Albums (OCC)	23

== Bumblebee (Motion Picture Score) ==
Bumblebee (Motion Picture Score)

Film score by Dario Marianelli
- Released: December 21, 2018
- Genre: Film score
- Length: 57:17
- Label: Paramount Music
- Producer: Dario Marianelli

Dario Marianelli chronology
Darkest Hour (2017)	Bumblebee (2018)	Pinocchio (2019)

Dario Marianelli composed the film's score thereby being the first film in the Transformers film series, not to be composed by Steve Jablonsky. He previously collaborated with the film's director, Travis Knight on the stop-motion animated film Kubo and the Two Strings (2016).

La-La Land Records released the limited edition of the soundtrack pressed to 2,000 copies on May 18, 2021.

=== Track listing ===
No.	Title	Length
1.	"Cybertron Falls"	1:53
2.	"Bee on the Run"	2:18
3.	"Shutdown"	3:45
4.	"Charlie"	3:07
5.	"Meeting Bumblebee"	4:07
6.	"Dropkick & Shatter Arrive"	1:38
7.	"Chasing Mum"	1:56
8.	"Optimus Prime's Message"	2:05
9.	"Desert Council"	2:08
10.	"Dad's Old Videotapes"	1:09
11.	"Army Meeting"	2:37
12.	"A Diving Volunteer"	1:32
13.	"Pranking Tina"	2:13
14.	"Bee in the Kitchen"	2:33
15.	"Kitchen Chaos"	1:45
16.	"Double Ambush"	2:21
17.	"Charlie Sneaks Out"	0:59
18.	"Death and Resurrection"	2:27
19.	"Bee's Had Enough"	5:15
20.	"Ron's Driving"	1:42
21.	"Marina Tower"	2:55
22.	"Charlie Dives In"	2:38
23.	"Saying Goodbye"	2:26
24.	"Not Quite There"	1:48
Total length:		57:17

=== Reception ===
Zanobard Reviews gave 5 out of 10 to the album, saying "the score to Bumblebee is fine. It's not ridiculously great or horrendously awful, it's just…nothing special" and criticised the decision for not featuring Jablonsky's themes. Anton Smit of Soundtrack World commented "This score is a good example of a well-implemented underscore for a movie. It helps with enhancing the emotions that evoked in each scene, but it is just not that interesting to listen to as a stand-alone album- with the exception of the “Charlie” theme. The theme itself is beautiful but is not able to carry the rest of the album."

Filmtracks.com wrote "the score holds its own despite all the song placements, though the acoustic guitar theme for the woman sounds a bit out of tune at times given its broken progressions in comparison to all the tonal songs surrounding its usage. And the absence of a cameo for the Jablonsky theme or the original television show's theme at the reunion scene on the Golden Gate Bridge (Optimus Prime in Freightliner truck mode has never looked so good) is a missed opportunity. But Marianelli's thoughtful entry into this franchise is very well handled and certainly merits his continued involvement." James Southall of Movie Wave wrote "it's all fine, and shows that Marianelli could do more films like this if he wanted to – he's demonstrated a side to himself that we didn't really know was there – but while it's obviously better than another generic Remote Control score, and while it is proper music, with at times ferociously complex orchestration, it's not really the most memorable – it's really in films like Kubo that he can really shine."

=== Personnel ===
Credits adapted from Paramount Music.

- Music composed and produced by – Dario Marianelli
- Additional music and programming – Jody Jenkins
- Musical assistance – Jessica Jones, Tim Morrish
- Recordist – Tim Lauber
- Pro-tools recordist – Larry Mah, Vinnie Cirilli
- Music consultant and mixing – Nick Wollage
- Additional mixing – Fiona Cruickshank
- Mastering – Mark Willsher
- Score editor – Kevin McKeever, Mark Willsher
- Production manager – Frank K. DeWald, Neil S. Bulk
- Music supervision – Maggie Rodford
- Booth score reader – James T. Sale
- Assistant engineer – Jack Mills
- Music preparation – Colin Rae, Mark Graham, Victor Pesavento
- Executive producer – Lorenzo Di Bonaventura, Michael Bay
- Liner notes – Daniel Schweiger
- Art direction – Dan Goldwasser
- Executive in charge of music – Randy Spendlove

Instruments

- Bassoon – Kenneth Munday, Patricia Kindel, William May, Rose Corrigan
- Cello – Armen Ksajikian, Ben Lash, Cecilia Tsan, Dennis Karmazyn, Eric Byers, Erika Duke-Kirkpatrick, Evgeny Tonkha, Jacob Braun, Michael Kaufman, Paula Hochhalter, Ross Gasworth, Simone Vitucci, Timothy Loo, Vanessa Freebairn-Smith, Helen Altenbach, Andrew Shulman
- Clarinet – Donald Foster, Joshua Ranz, Ralph Williams, Stuart Clark
- Contrabass – Brianna Goldberg, David Parmeter, Drew Dembowski, Edward Meares, Geoffrey Osika, Michael Valerio, Stephen Dress, Thomas Harte, Nico Abondolo
- Flute – Heather Clark, Jennifer Olson, Geri Rotella
- French horn – Amy Rhine, Benjamin Jaber, Dylan Hart, Kaylet Torrez, Laura Brenes, Mark Adams, Mike McCoy, Steven Becknell, David Everson
- Harp – Gayle Levant
- Oboe – Clair Brazeau-Bratt, Jennifer Cullinan, Lara Wickes, Jessica Pearlman
- Percussion – Edward Atkatz, Kenneth McGrath, Wade Culbreath
- Trombone – Andrew Martin, William Reichenbach, Phillip Keen, Steven Suminski, Alexander Iles
- Trumpet – Mike Stever, Robert Schaer, Thomas Hooten, Jon Lewis
- Tuba – Doug Tornquist
- Viola – Aaron Oltman, Alma Fernandez, Andrew Duckles, Carolyn Riley, Corinne Sobolewski, David Walther, Erik Rynearson, Zach Dellinger, Jonathan Moerschel, Karoline Menezes-Smith, Laura Pearson, Luke Maurer, Michael Larco, Michael Whitson, Shawn Mann, Victoria Miskolczy, Robert Brophy
- Violin – Akiko Tarumoto, Alyssa Park, Amy Hershberger, Ana Landauer, Benjamin Jacobson, Charlie Bisharat, Darius Campo, Dimitrie Leivici, Eun-Mee Ahn, Grace Oh, Heather Powell, Helen Nightengale, Ina Veli, Irina Voloshina, Jacqueline Brand, Jessica Guideri, Joel Pargman, Josefina Vergara, Julie Gigante, Ken Aiso, Kevin Connolly, Kevin Kumar, Lisa Liu, Lorand Lokuszta, Luanne Homzy, Maia Jasper-White, Maya Magub, Natalie Leggett, Nathan Cole, Neil Samples, Phillip Levy, Rafael Rishik, Roberto Cani, Sara Parkins, Sarah Thornblade, Shalini Vijayan, Songa Lee, Tamara Hatwan, Tereza Stanislav, Roger Wilkie

Orchestra

- Orchestration – Dario Marianelli, Geoff Alexander
- Orchestra conductor – Dario Marianelli
- Orchestra contractor – Peter Rotter
- Concertmaster – Belinda Broughton
- Stage engineer – Erin Rettig
- Stage manager – Damon Tedesco, Peter Nelson

Vocals

- Alto – Aleta Braxton, Jennifer Haydn-Jones, Jessica Rotter, Jessie Shulman, Kasondra Kazanjian, Laura Smith Roethe, Lesley Leighton, Sara Mann
- Bass – Abdiel Gonzalez, Daniel J. O'Brien, David Loucks, Dylan Gentile, Mark Edward Smith, Michael Bannett, Michael Miersma, William Kenneth Goldman
- Soprano – Ayana Haviv, Carrah Stamatakis, Elyse Willis, Holly Sedillos, Kelci Hahn, Meredith Pyle, Suzanne Waters, Tamara Bevard
- Tenor – Bradley Chapman, Gerald White, Greg Whipple, Jasper Randall, Joshua D. McGowan, Matthew Tresler, Steven Harms, Todd Strange
- Vocal contractor – Jasper Randall
