= Trap Paris =

Song by Machine Gun Kelly featuring Quavo and Travis Scott

Single by Machine Gun Kelly featuring Quavo and Ty Dolla $ign

from the album Bloom
- Released: April 13, 2017
- Recorded: 2016–2017
- Studio: Baked Blvd
- Genre: Trap; hip hop
- Length: 3:23
- Label: EST 19XX; Bad Boy; Interscope
- Songwriters: Colson Baker; Sonny Uwaezouki; Quavious Marshall; Tyrone Griffin, Jr
- Producer: Sonny Digital

Machine Gun Kelly singles chronology
"At My Best" (2017)	"Trap Paris" (2017)	"Go for Broke" (2017)

Ty Dolla $ign singles chronology
"F with U" (2017)	"Trap Paris" (2017)	"Whatever You Need" (2017)

Quavo singles chronology
"I'm the One" (2017)	"Trap Paris" (2017)	"Paper Ova Here" (2017)

Music video
- "Trap Paris" on YouTube

"Trap Paris" is a song by American musician Machine Gun Kelly featuring fellow American musicians Quavo and Ty Dolla $ign. It was released on April 13, 2017, via Bad Boy and Interscope.

== Background and concept ==
The song is originally about a night in Berlin but Machine Gun Kelly felt that "Germany" had too many syllables, whereas Paris was "just so quick". Kelly hesitated to add a second verse to the song, and seeing as the album does not have that many collaborations, he decided to more collaborations. He contacted Quavo for a possible feature. Quavo responded by sending his verse. Kelly got Dolla Sign on the song after they were at Sean Combs's house party and traded numbers for a feature. Ty recorded the chorus the following day. This was Kelly and Ty Dolla Sign's first time working together. The song was officially released on April 13, 2017.

== Music video ==
The music video was released June 7, 2017 and it was directed by Ben Griffin. As of March 2023, the music video has received over 41 million views.

== Charts ==
Chart (2017)	Peak position
Canada Hot 100 (Billboard)	98

== Certifications ==
Region	Certification	Certified units/sales
United States (RIAA)	Gold	500,000^{‡}
^{‡} Sales+streaming figures based on certification alone.
