= Paddington 2 (soundtrack) =

Paddington 2 (Original Motion Picture Soundtrack)

Film score by Dario Marianelli
- Released: 10 November 2017
- Recorded: 2017
- Genre: Film score
- Length: 59:26
- Label: Decca

Dario Marianelli chronology
Ali and Nino (2016)	Paddington 2 (Original Motion Picture Soundtrack) (2017)	Darkest Hour (2017)

Paddington 2 (Original Motion Picture Soundtrack) is the soundtrack to the 2017 film Paddington 2 directed by Paul King, which is a sequel to Paddington (2014). Originally, the film was set to be scored by Nick Urata, who expressed his interest in returning to the sequel. However, the film was later scored by Dario Marianelli in his first collaboration with King.

Decca Records released the soundtrack on 10 November 2017 alongside the film's theatrical release in the United Kingdom.

Ai provides the theme song for the Japanese release of the sequel, titled "Little Hero."

== Critical reception ==
Geoffrey Macnab of The Independent summarised "Composer Dario Marianelli's whirling, high tempo score adds to the increasingly frantic feel of the storytelling." Blake Goble of Consequence wrote "There's even a poppy glockenspiel on the score from Oscar winner Dario Marianelli while these washings occur; this movie is just that upbeat." Guy Lodge of Variety and Leslie Felperin of The Hollywood Reporter called it as "lovable" and "charming". KT Schaefer of Substream Magazine wrote "Composer Dario Marianelli is a new addition to this film and his beautiful score flows through the scenes and heightens the emotional and comedic beats."

David Ehrlich of IndieWire ranked the album as the tenth best film score of 2018. Ehrlich described Marianelli's work as "colorful but never cloying, sensitive but never saccharine, and always as buoyant and bright-eyed as Paddington himself" and felt it to be "deeper, richer, and more vibrant in every way" in comparison with Urata's score for the predecessor. He also voted on Paddington 2 receiving nominations at the 91st Academy Awards for minimum five categories, which included Best Original Score for Marianelli. However, the film did not receive any nominations at the ceremony.

== Track listing ==
Paddington 2 (Original Motion Picture Soundtrack) track listing
No.	Title	Length
1.	"Windsor Gardens"	4:03
2.	"The Pop-Up Book"	1:29
3.	"A Shave, Sir? A Light Pomade"	1:54
4.	"Window Cleaning"	3:15
5.	"Rub and Scrub (Tobago and d'Lime)"	2:27
6.	"The Book Is Stolen"	2:21
7.	"A Letter from Prison"	2:20
8.	"It's Only One Red Sock"	1:24
9.	"Madame Kozlova's Story"	1:19
10.	"One Orange at a Time"	3:03
11.	"An Unusually Attractive Nun"	1:19
12.	"Marmalade Chefs"	1:22
13.	"Love Thy Neighbour (Tobago and d'Lime)"	2:05
14.	"The Break-In"	3:24
15.	"Jungle Jail"	2:14
16.	"Escape Waltz"	3:27
17.	"Lost and Found"	3:03
18.	"Race to Paddington Station"	1:34
19.	"The Steam Trains"	3:46
20.	"Bullseye-Henry"	2:04
21.	"Splash"	2:22
22.	"Happy Birthday Aunt Lucy"	3:34
23.	"Jump in the Line (End Titles)"	5:31
Total length:		59:26

== Accolades ==
Accolades for Paddington 2 (Original Motion Picture Soundtrack)
Award	Date of ceremony	Category	Nominee(s)	Result	Ref.
International Film Music Critics Association	22 February 2018	Best Original Score for a Comedy Film	Dario Marianelli	Nominated	
