= Coast (song) =

Single by Hailee Steinfeld featuring Anderson .Paak
- Released: July 29, 2022
- Genre: Pop
- Length: 2:47
- Label: Republic
- Songwriters: Hailee Steinfeld; Brandon Anderson; Mikky Ekko; Gabe Simon
- Producers: Koz; Gabe Simon

Hailee Steinfeld singles chronology
"I Love You's" (2020)	"Coast" (2022)	"SunKissing" (2023)

Anderson .Paak singles chronology
"Take a Chance" (2022)	"Coast" (2022)	"Twin Flame" (2022)

Music video
- "Coast" on YouTube

"Coast" is a song by American singer and actress Hailee Steinfeld, released as a single on July 29, 2022. A pop record, the song features American singer and songwriter Anderson .Paak, and is Steinfeld's first release in two years since her 2020 EP Half Written Story. The song was written by Steinfeld and Paak themselves, alongside Mikky Ekko and Gabe Simon, who produced the song alongside Koz.

Upon its release, the song was received positively by music critics and peaked at number 5 on the Official Aotearoa Music Charts in New Zealand and was certified Gold by Recorded Music NZ (RMNZ) for equivalent sales of 15,000 units in the country. The music video was released on November 11, 2022.

== Background and release ==
On April 19, 2022 Steinfeld teased a part of the song in a commercial for "Core Hydration" and made it available for pre-save; she explained "I'm very excited about the fact that this is just a very small taste of what's to come. I cannot wait to put music out. It's been a long time coming". On July 20, 2022, she officially announced the release date for July 29, 2022. On July 23, 2022, through her Instagram account she revealed that song would be a collaboration with Anderson .Paak.

Steinfeld noted that:

"The only artist I envisioned collaborating with on this track was my friend, Anderson .Paak. Knowing he loved the song enough to lend his genius to it is absolutely surreal, and I am forever grateful to have his support"."

The song was released on July 29, 2022, through digital platforms.

== Composition ==
The song was described as "a vibey, electric guitar-backed pop earworm". "Coast" was composed in B major with 112 beats per minute.

== Critical reception ==
Upon release, the song received generally positive reviews. Billboard wrote that the song "is intriguingly less shiny than previous hits, instead opting for laid-back, breezy production. Perfect for the end of summer as the days begin to cool down, "Coast" finds Steinfeld and first-time collaborator Anderson .Paak bottle up the feeling of a relationship's casual beginnings". V writer Ava Manson praised the song noting that it "gives the energy of a seasoned creative all the way, from rhythmic intro to lively chorus" and that "years may have passed since [Steinfeld's] last drop, but you'd never deem her out of practice with the craft".

== Charts ==
Chart performance for "Coast"
Chart (2022)	Peak position
New Zealand Hot Singles (RMNZ)	5

== Certifications ==
Certifications for "Coast"
Region	Certification	Certified units/sales
New Zealand (RMNZ)	Gold	15,000^{‡}
^{‡} Sales+streaming figures based on certification alone.
