= Darkest Hour (soundtrack) =

2017 film soundtrack album

Darkest Hour (Original Motion Picture Soundtrack)

Film score by Dario Marianelli
- Released: 17 November 2017
- Recorded: 2017
- Studio: AIR Studios, London
- Genre: Film score
- Length: 51:57
- Label: Deutsche Grammophon; Decca Classics; UMG
- Producer: Dario Marianelli

Dario Marianelli chronology
| Paddington 2 (2017) | Darkest Hour (2017) | Bumblebee (2018) |

Darkest Hour (Original Motion Picture Soundtrack) is the film score to the 2017 film Darkest Hour directed by Joe Wright starring Gary Oldman as Winston Churchill. The original score is composed by Dario Marianelli and featured piano solos by Víkingur Ólafsson. The album was released through Deutsche Grammophon, Decca Classics and Universal Music Group on 17 November 2017.

== Development ==
In November 2016, the producers announced that Dario Marianelli, a frequent collaborator of Wright, would score music for Darkest Hour. Marianelli created a layered soundscape to accompany the emotional side of the characters, combining both vigor and despair and eventually entwined into a bombastic score that underline's Churchill's famous speech: We shall fight on the beaches. Marianelli discussed with Wright regarding the film's music even before the script was completed, as it anchored the music at a pre-visual level, anchoring a crucial facet of Churchill's character.

Marianelli stated that "Even from the beginning, Joe already knew that much of the music would need pace and momentum, because he wanted to bring out the restlessness of Churchill’s mind. Churchill was able to think fast, and he did a great deal of thinking in those first few weeks of war." He further exclaimed that Wright provided him an old photograph of Churchill for inspiration, which he stated that it had an "energy" in it, only to which Wright revealed that it was Oldman himself to which Marianelli found "quite wonderful". Analyzing this as an inspiration, Marianelli wrote 6–7 pieces of piano solos and further experimented it by adding rhythmical artillery explosions and using voices. Eventually, Marianelli kept the explosions and dropped the voices, and further tried orchestrating the fast-paced piano pieces which worked well.

For research, Marianelli stated he tried to find out on the kind of songs that Churchill listened to, though he did not come up with anything particular. Marianelli assured that he should not focus on one aspect of Chruchill and stayed loose with the connections while reflecting them musically. His score does not merely support Churchill's vision or weightage to his worlds, but also frustrates his gravitas and feeds into his doubt, thereby restoring an element of awareness to the performantive nature of Churchill's existence and humanizes him in the end. Marianelli worked on the score for over a year prior to shooting and much of his score for the film were used as temp music.

== Release ==
The score for Darkest Hour was released through Deutsche Grammophon, Decca Classics and Universal Music Group digitally on 17 November 2017 and in physical formats on 8 December 2017.

== Reception ==
Jonathan Broxton of Movie Music UK wrote: "in a year where the British experience of World War II has been a recurring theme at the box office, Darkest Hour provides for me the most well-rounded and musically interesting take on the topic." Godfrey Cheshire of RogerEbert.com wrote: "Wright’s team also benefits from the understated lyricism of Dario Marianelli’s score." Peter Travers of Rolling Stone called it "a thrilling score by Dario Marianelli". Wendy Ide of Screen International called it a "stirring score [that] could occasionally be accused of talking down to the audience".

Todd McCarthy of The Hollywood Reporter wrote: "Dario Marianelli’s score is intrusive in many instances, laying on the obvious when less could have been more". Peter Debruge of Variety said that Marianelli's "swirling, march-like motifs" provide much of the energy. Adam Lubitow of City stated that "The score by Dario Marianelli consistently finds the right tone, alternating between quiet melancholy and dramatic bombast." Adam Chitwood of Collider wrote: "composer Dario Marianelli—who already composed one iconic score with Wright for Atonement—outdoes himself here with a piano-driven soundtrack that is magnificent. It’s alternatively thrilling, somber, introspective, and gregarious, the latter reflecting Churchill’s demeanor in brilliant fashion."

== Track listing ==
| No. | Title | Length |
|---|---|---|
| 1. | "Prelude" | 2:25 |
| 2. | "Where Is Winston?" | 2:43 |
| 3. | "Full English" | 1:59 |
| 4. | "A Telegram from the Palace" | 1:43 |
| 5. | "One of Them" | 1:33 |
| 6. | "Winston and George" | 3:15 |
| 7. | "First Speech to the Commons" | 3:36 |
| 8. | "The War Rooms" | 2:45 |
| 9. | "From the Air" | 1:25 |
| 10. | "I Wouldn't Trust Him with My Bicycle" | 1:57 |
| 11. | "Radio Broadcast" | 3:05 |
| 12. | "History Is Listening" | 2:34 |
| 13. | "An Ultimatum" | 1:28 |
| 14. | "Dynamo" | 2:37 |
| 15. | "We Must Prepare for Imminent Invasion" | 3:03 |
| 16. | "The Words Won't Come" | 2:17 |
| 17. | "Just Before the Dawn" | 2:14 |
| 18. | "District Line, East, One Stop." | 3:52 |
| 19. | "We Shall Fight" | 7:26 |
| Total length: | | 51:57 |

== Accolades ==
| Award | Date of ceremony | Category | Recipient(s) and nominee(s) | Result | Ref(s) |
|---|---|---|---|---|---|
| British Academy Film Awards | 18 February 2018 | Best Film Music | Dario Marianelli| style="background: #FFE3E3; color: black; vertical-align: middle; text-align: center; " class="no table-no2 notheme"|Nominated | | |
| Critics' Choice Movie Awards | 11 January 2018 | Best Score | Dario Marianelli| style="background: #FFE3E3; color: black; vertical-align: middle; text-align: center; " class="no table-no2 notheme"|Nominated | | |
| Georgia Film Critics Association | 12 January 2018 | Best Original Score | Dario Marianelli| style="background: #FFE3E3; color: black; vertical-align: middle; text-align: center; " class="no table-no2 notheme"|Nominated | | |
| Satellite Awards | 10 February 2018 | Best Original Score | Dario Marianelli| style="background: #FFE3E3; color: black; vertical-align: middle; text-align: center; " class="no table-no2 notheme"|Nominated | | |
