= Half Written Story =

2020 EP by Hailee Steinfeld

EP by Hailee Steinfeld
- Released: May 8, 2020
- Recorded: January 2017 – April 2020
- Genre: Pop
- Length: 17:17
- Label: Republic
- Producer: Koz; David Stewart; D'Mile; The 23rd

Hailee Steinfeld chronology
Haiz (2015)	Half Written Story (2020)

Singles from Half Written Story
- 1. "Wrong Direction" Released: January 1, 2020; 2. "I Love You's" Released: March 26, 2020

Half Written Story is the second extended play (EP) by American singer Hailee Steinfeld, released on May 8, 2020, through Republic Records. The pop EP is Steinfeld's first release since her debut EP Haiz in November 2015. It was initially intended to be the first half of a two-part project, but the idea was later scrapped. The EP was recorded from January 2017 to April 2020, and was produced by Koz, David Stewart, D'Mile, and the 23rd.

The EP was preceded by two singles, "Wrong Direction" and "I Love You's". "Wrong Direction" peaked within the top 10 of the Official Aotearoa Music Charts in New Zealand and was certified Gold in Brazil and Canada. "I Love You's" was less successful, peaking at number 14 on the chart. Upon its release, the EP garnered a mixed reception from music critics, but would peak within the top 10 of the Billboard Heatseekers Albums chart, with a position at number 3.

== Background and recording ==
After the release of Haiz, Steinfeld began recording new music for an album project in January 2017 while filming Pitch Perfect 3. That year, Steinfeld released the singles "Most Girls" and "Let Me Go" that were intended to be a part of the album. In March 2018, Steinfeld confirmed that she was finishing her album and intended to release it in 2018. The following December, after the album wasn't released, Steinfeld confirmed that after finishing filming Dickinson in January 2019, she would be "finishing what [she] started" with her music and releasing the album in 2019.

On March 26, 2020, it was reported that Steinfeld would release a two-part project in 2020 with the first part being released on May 1, 2020. Steinfeld later announced on April 24, 2020 that the project's first part's release was being pushed to May 8, 2020, due to her needing more time to perfect it. The project's first part was finished that month. On April 27, 2020, Steinfeld announced that the project's first part would be called Half Written Story as well as revealing its cover art and track list. The EP got its name from lyrics in "Your Name Hurts" saying "we're a half-written story without any ending" and "this half-written story is horror at best".

This project is a collection of songs that are so special to me and I'm incredibly proud of. This is the first body of work I've put out since my debut project in 2015 and I can't wait for everyone to hear these new songs.

— Steinfeld discussing the EP.

== Music and lyrics ==
Half Written Story is primarily a pop music record with lyrics that discuss heartbreak and strength. The EP contains five tracks. It opens with "I Love You's" an upbeat romantic pop anthem about self love and hope. Sampling "No More I Love You's" by Annie Lennox, the song's production consists of "floaty" synths and "peppy" beats. "Your Name Hurts" is a retro R&B track that according to Steinfeld is about when "a person's name can go from [making] your heart skip a beat to something that makes you feel nauseous." "End This (L.O.V.E.)" is a "minor-key lament" where Steinfeld was inspired by Bea Miller's "S.L.U.T." to make a song with an abbreviation that has a flipped meaning. The song samples the melody from "L-O-V-E" by Nat King Cole and sees Steinfeld singing in a lower range. "Man Up" is a hip hop-influenced pop-rap song that "coheres into a believably messy portrait of love's aftermath". The closing track and lead single, "Wrong Direction" is an "emotional" tearjerker piano ballad that addresses a past relationship.

== Singles ==
"Wrong Direction" was released as the EP's lead single on January 1, 2020. Upon its release, the single charted at number 61 on the Irish Singles Chart, number 71 on the Scottish Singles Charts, and number 9 on the Official Aotearoa Music Charts in New Zealand, its highest position on any chart it made. It was also certified Gold by both Pro-Música Brasil (PMB) and Music Canada (PMB) for equivalent sales of 20,000 and 40,000 units in their respective countries. A music video was also released for the song on the 8th of January, directed by Alexandre Moors.

"Wrong Direction" was followed by "I Love You's" on March 26, 2020. Upon its release, "I Love You's" charted at number 37 on Radiomonitor's Australia Airplay charts and at number 48 on the Billboard Digital Song Sales chart in the United States, and peaked at number 14 on the Official Aotearoa Music Charts. Its lyric video, directed by Katia Temkin, was released on the same day as the single, and a music video directed by both Steinfeld herself and Sarah McColgan would be released on the 31st of March, 2020. Although not released as a single, the album track "End This (L.O.V.E.)" charted at number 27 on the Official Aotearoa Music Charts.

== Critical reception ==
Half Written Story received mixed reviews from critics. Chris DeVille of Stereogum complimented the EP's improvement of Steinfeld's music stating "Half Written Story presents a slightly more fully-formed vision of Steinfeld the singer" and "together [Koz] and Steinfeld have constructed a collection that, if not exactly brimming with idiosyncrasies, conveys more of the charm and sass that typify her onscreen work". Steve Baltin of Forbes called the EP "stellar" as well as writing "When you hear her intimate, her attitude in the joyous pop, the production and the passion she brings to the first five songs it is clear her love of music is genuine". Writing for i-D, Douglas Greenwood called the EP a "belter" as well as saying it's a "searingly honest mini collection of proper pop songs." Mathias Rosenzweig of V called it "a raw and emotive body of work for the starlet". Katrina Rees of CelebMix gave a favourable review writing "Half Written Story is a cohesive offering which showcases Hailee's growth as an artist" and "Hailee has delivered an impressive EP which exhibits confidence and vulnerability in equal measure."

Natalie Weiner of Variety criticized the EP's choice of songs writing "The desire to make a meatier banger is clearly there, given how long she's been at it and the kind of material she chooses; she has the voice and the baseline taste level. It's hard to imagine, though, that any of these songs will make her a recognizable force in pop." Jason Lipshutz of Billboard also criticized the EP's choice of songs writing "none of the songs sound like surefire radio staples" but also complimented the EP writing "the five new songs are the most experimental, and personal, of Steinfeld's career."

== Commercial performance ==
Upon the EP's release, Half Written Story charted at number 97 on the Official Charts Company's UK Download Albums chart and number 63 on the Billboard Top Current Albums chart in the United States, alongside an ultimate peak at number 3 on the Billboard Heatseekers Albums chart, also in the United States.

== Track listing ==
Half Written Story track listing
No.	Title	Writer(s)	Producer(s)	Length
1.	"I Love You's"	Jessica Agombar; Sarah Griffiths; David Stewart; David Freeman; Joseph Hughes	Stewart	3:36
2.	"Your Name Hurts"	Hailee Steinfeld; Elizabeth Lowell Boland; Janee Bennett; Caroline Pennell; Stephen Kozmeniuk	Koz	3:42
3.	"End This (L.O.V.E.)"	Steinfeld; Boland; Trey Campbell; Kozmeniuk; Bert Kaempfert; Milt Gabler	Koz; The 23rd	3:03
4.	"Man Up"	Steinfeld; Boland; Kennedi Lykken; Brett McLaughlin; Dernst Emile	D'Mile	2:48
5.	"Wrong Direction"	Steinfeld; Boland; Skyler Stonestreet; Kozmeniuk	Koz	4:08
Total length:				17:17

=== Notes ===
- "I Love You's" samples "No More I Love You's" by Annie Lennox, written by Joseph Hughes and David Freeman.
- "End This (L.O.V.E.)" samples the melody from "L-O-V-E" by Nat King Cole, written by Bert Kaempfert and Milt Gabler.

== Credits and personnel ==
Credits adapted from Tidal, Instagram, and Universal Music Canada.

=== Performers ===
- Hailee Steinfeld – vocals
- Elizabeth Lowell Boland – backing vocals (2–5), piano (5)
- Todd Clark – backing vocals (5)
- Caroline Pennell – backing vocals (2)
- Skyler Stonestreet – backing vocals (5)
- Koz – drums (2), bass synthesizer (5)
- Hrag Sanbalian – synthesizer (2)

=== Technical ===
- Koz – executive production, production, programming (2–5)
- David Stewart – production, programming (1)
- D'Mile – production, programming (4)
- The 23rd – production, programming (3)
- John Hanes – engineering, studio personnel (1)
- Matt Snell – assistant recording engineering, studio personnel (5)
- Phil Hotz – assistant recording engineering, studio personnel (5)
- Drew Jurecka – string arranging (5)
- Serban Ghenea – mixing, studio personnel (1)
- Matty Green – mixing, studio personnel (2)
- Josh Gudwin – mixing, studio personnel (5)
- Jamie Snell – mixing, studio personnel (3–4)
- Ewan Vickery – assistant mixing, studio personnel (3–4)
- Randy Merrill – mastering, studio personnel (1)

=== Design ===
- Allison Snyder – creative direction
- Julie Vastola – creative direction
- Juan Manuel Villarreal – design
- Danna Galeano – animation
- Katia Temkin – animation

== Charts ==
Chart (2020)	Peak position
UK Download Albums (OCC)	97
US Heatseekers Albums (Billboard)	3
US Top Current Albums (Billboard)	63

== Release history ==
Region	Date	Format(s)	Label	Ref.
Various	May 8, 2020	Digital download; streaming	Republic	
