= At My Best =

Single by Machine Gun Kelly featuring Hailee Steinfeld

from the album Bloom
- Released: March 17, 2017
- Recorded: 2017
- Genre: Hip hop; emo rap; pop-rap
- Length: 3:20
- Label: EST 19XX; Bad Boy; Interscope
- Songwriters: Colson Baker; Edvard Førre Erfjord; Benjamin Levin; Henrik Michelsen; Rachel Moulden; Nathan Perez
- Producer: Happy Perez

Machine Gun Kelly singles chronology
"No More Sad Songs" (2017)	"At My Best" (2017)	"Trap Paris" (2017)

Hailee Steinfeld singles chronology
"Show You Love" (2017)	"At My Best" (2017)	"Most Girls" (2017)

Music video
- "At My Best" on YouTube

"At My Best" is a song by American rapper Machine Gun Kelly featuring American singer Hailee Steinfeld. It was released on March 17, 2017, via Bad Boy and Interscope.

== Background ==
"This song's for anybody that feels like I did, never the cool kid," MGK said. "This song's for anybody who fought their way through, always remained true. This song's for anybody, the ones that's trying to get it the ones that dream it and live it."

== Music video ==
The music video for the song was released on April 21, 2017, and features MGK and Hailee Steinfeld. The video shows them "struggling to find their place in the world, trying to feel comfortable with who they are".

== Critical reception ==
Lauren Tom of Billboard magazine said that the song has a "strong string of vocals, plenty of guitar riffs and an exciting electric sound MGK has used in the past with his other songs", "sends a powerful message through its lyrics, telling listeners to 'keep going' and to fight for your dream, always staying true to yourself."

In another article, she said that the music video "bridges together the track's compelling and evocative lyrics that push you to believe in yourself. The emotional ending focuses on the internal struggles we have with ourselves."

== Track listing ==
Digital download
No.	Title	Length
1.	"At My Best" (featuring Hailee Steinfeld)	3:20

== Charts ==
Chart (2017)	Peak position
Australia (ARIA)	87
Austria (Ö3 Austria Top 40)	71
Belgium (Ultratip Bubbling Under Flanders)	18
Canada Hot 100 (Billboard)	66
Czech Republic Airplay (ČNS IFPI)	73
New Zealand Heatseekers (RMNZ)	4
Sweden Heatseeker (Sverigetopplistan)	2
US Billboard Hot 100	60
US Hot Rap Songs (Billboard)	23
US Pop Airplay (Billboard)	21
US Rhythmic Airplay (Billboard)	26

== Certifications ==
Region	Certification	Certified units/sales
New Zealand (RMNZ)	Gold	15,000^{‡}
United States (RIAA)	Platinum	1,000,000^{‡}
^{‡} Sales+streaming figures based on certification alone.

== Release history ==
Region	Date	Format	Label	Ref.
United States	March 17, 2017	Digital download	Bad Boy; Interscope	
United States	March 28, 2017	Mainstream radio	Bad Boy; Interscope	
United States	March 28, 2017	Rhythmic contemporary	Bad Boy; Interscope	
United States	March 28, 2017	Top 40 radio	Bad Boy; Interscope	
