= I Love You's =

2020 single by Hailee Steinfeld

Single by Hailee Steinfeld

from the EP Half Written Story
- Released: March 26, 2020
- Genre: Pop
- Length: 3:36
- Label: Republic
- Songwriters: David Freeman; David Stewart; Joseph Hughes; Jessica Agombar; Sarah Griffiths
- Producer: David Stewart

Hailee Steinfeld singles chronology
"Wrong Direction" (2020)	"I Love You's" (2020)	"Coast" (2022)

Music video
- "I Love You's" on YouTube

"I Love You's" is a song by American singer Hailee Steinfeld, released on March 26, 2020, through Republic Records. The track serves as the second single from Steinfeld's second EP Half Written Story (2020). The song, a pop record, samples "No More I Love You's" by Annie Lennox, thus David Freeman and Joseph Hughes are credited as songwriters. The song was also written by Jessica Agombar, Sarah "Griff" Griffiths, and its producer, David Stewart (not to be confused with Dave Stewart of Lennox's former music group Eurythmics).

Upon its release, the single charted at number 48 on the Billboard Digital Song Sales in the United States and number 37 on Radiomonitor's Australia Airplay chart, and peaked at number 14 on the Official Aotearoa Music Charts in New Zealand. To promote the song, a lyric video directed by Katia Temkin was released on the same day as the single, and a music video directed by Steinfeld herself, alongside Sarah McColgan, was released on the 31st of March, 2020, The song was also performed on The Tonight Show Starring Jimmy Fallon on the 1st of May, 2020.

== Background ==
Steinfeld released an album cover, as well as dropping the name for the song on Instagram on March 24, 2020, with the caption "i love you's • march 26th". According to Rolling Stone, the song was inspired by Annie Lennox's "No More 'I Love You's" (1995). Steinfeld spoke to EW about what inspired the song:

"I went through a breakup and did not give myself enough time to heal from that before getting into another relationship. When that second relationship ended it became clear that I needed time and space to heal — I hadn't given myself that to begin with that first time around. I didn't realize the importance of that."

== Composition ==
The song features "floaty synths" and "peppy beats". Lyrically, it is about self-love and hope and is composed in the key of E♭major with a tempo of 107 beats per minute.

== Music video ==
A lyric video, created by Katia Temkin, accompanied the song's release. Steinfeld co-directed the song's official music video with Sarah McColgan, which premiered via YouTube on March 31, 2020. The music video shot in black-and-white featuring Steinfeld wearing see-through clothing while embedded with white background in studio.

== Live performances ==
During the COVID-19 pandemic, Steinfeld performed the song in an at-home edition of The Tonight Show Starring Jimmy Fallon on May 1, 2020.

== Credits and personnel ==
Song credits adapted from Tidal.

- Hailee Steinfeld – vocals
- David Stewart – songwriting, production, programming
- David Freeman – songwriting
- Jessica Agombar – songwriting
- Joseph Hughes – songwriting
- Sarah "Griff" Griffiths – songwriting
- John Hanes – engineering, studio personnel
- Randy Merrill – mastering, studio personnel
- Serban Ghenea – mixing, studio personnel

== Charts ==
Chart (2020)	Peak position
Australia Airplay (Radiomonitor)	37
New Zealand Hot Singles (RMNZ)	14
US Digital Song Sales (Billboard)	48

== Release history ==
Region	Date	Format	Label(s)	Ref.
Various	26 March 2020	Digital download; streaming	Republic	
Australia	27 March 2020	Contemporary hit radio	Universal	
United Kingdom	13 June 2020	Adult contemporary radio	Republic	
