= Back to Life (Hailee Steinfeld song) =

2018 song by Hailee Steinfeld

Single by Hailee Steinfeld

from the album Bumblebee
- B-side: "Back to Life (Aris Archontis 80s Remix)"
- Released: November 2, 2018
- Genre: Electropop; synth-pop
- Length: 3:53 (Original version); 3:13 (80s remix)
- Label: Republic
- Songwriters: Wayne Sermon; Michael Pollack; Hailee Steinfeld; Jorgen Odegard; Josh Gudwin; Kennedi Lykken
- Producer: Jorgen Odegard

Hailee Steinfeld singles chronology
"Colour" (2018)	"Back to Life" (2018)	"Woke Up Late" (2019)

"Back to Life" is a song by American actress and singer Hailee Steinfeld, released as a single from the soundtrack of the film Bumblebee on November 2, 2018. The song, an electropop and synth-pop record, was written by Steinfeld herself, alongside fellow American musician Wayne Sermon, Michael Pollack, Josh Gudwin, Kennedi Lykken, and Jorgen Odegard, the latter also producing the song. Upon its release, the single charted at number 41 on the Rádio – Top 100 chart in the Czech Republic.

== Composition ==
The song has been called an "electro-kissed anthem" with "shimmering production" and "loved-up lyrics", with Steinfeld singing "Our love's enough, transcending us through space and time. It's holding up. It keeps you and me intertwined." The chorus, which contains the line "'Cause I'm bringing you back to life", was called "earnest".

== Release and promotion ==
The single was released on the 2nd of November, 2018, backed with an "80s Remix" created by Aris Archontis. It would later be included as the opening track to the movie's official soundtrack, released later that year, on the 21st of December. The "80s Remix" was also included, as the album's sixteenth final track. Steinfeld talked about the song in a social media post from October 2018, saying that it would be the first time she has her own song in a film she stars in. It was pointed out by Idolator's Mike Nied that this evidently does not count the songs she recorded for Pitch Perfect 2 and 3. Steinfeld hosted and performed the song for the first time at the 2018 MTV Europe Music Awards, two days after the song's release.

== Critical reception ==
Nicole Engelman of Billboard said the track "pushes Steinfeld's soaring vocals to the forefront, layering them over an irresistible synth-heavy beat with all of the potentials of a dance-floor hit". Engelman also felt that the chorus has a "Chainsmokers-esque beat drop and infectious hook".

== Charts ==
Chart (2018–19)	Peak position
Czech Republic Airplay (ČNS IFPI)	41
