= Wrong Direction (song) =

Single by Hailee Steinfeld

from the EP Half Written Story
- Released: January 1, 2020
- Length: 4:09
- Label: Republic
- Songwriters: Elizabeth Lowell Boland; Hailee Steinfeld; Skyler Stonestreet; Stephen Kozmeniuk
- Producer: Koz

Hailee Steinfeld singles chronology
"Afterlife" (2019)	"Wrong Direction" (2020)	"I Love You's" (2020)

Music video
- "Wrong Direction" on YouTube

"Wrong Direction" is a song by American singer Hailee Steinfeld and was released by Republic Records on January 1, 2020. The song serves as the lead single from Steinfeld's second EP Half Written Story (2020), through Republic Records. The song was written by Steinfeld, alongside Lowell, Skyler Stonestreet, and the song's producer, Koz. Upon its release, the song peaked within the top 10 of the Official Aotearoa Music Charts in New Zealand, and was certified Gold in Brazil and Canada. A music video was released 7 days later, directed by Alexandre Moors.

== Background and composition ==
Steinfeld first teased the song's release by posting a picture on social media with the caption "1/1". Later that day she announced the song's title. It is speculated that the song is about Steinfeld's split from ex-boyfriend Niall Horan (of One Direction) in 2018. Its title is also presumed to be a reference to Horan's band One Direction, who are currently on hiatus.

"Wrong Direction" was written by Elizabeth Lowell Boland, Hailee Steinfeld, Skyler Stonestreet and Stephen Kozmeniuk, and was produced by Koz. The song runs for four minutes and eight seconds. Ashley Iasimone of Billboard characterized "Wrong Direction" as "an emotional ballad that addresses a past relationship".

== Commercial performance ==
Upon its release, the song charted at number 71 on the Scottish Singles Chart and number 61 on the Irish Singles Chart, and peaked at number 9 on the Official Aotearoa Music Charts, based in New Zealand. The song was also certified Gold by both Pro-Música Brasil (PMB) and Music Canada (MC) for equivalent sales of 20,000 units in their respective countries.

== Music video ==
The Alexandre Moors-directed music video was released on January 8, 2020, via YouTube premiere.

== Track listing ==
Digital download
No.	Title	Length
1.	"Wrong Direction"	4:08

== Credits and personnel ==
Credits adapted from Tidal.

- Hailee Steinfeld – vocals, songwriting
- Koz – production, songwriting, bass guitar, drums, programming, synthesizer
- Lowell – songwriting, backing vocals, piano
- Skyler Stonestreet – songwriting, backing vocals
- Todd Clark – backing vocals
- Matt Snell – assistant recording engineering, studio personnel
- Phil Hotz – assistant recording engineering, studio personnel
- Josh Gudwin – mixing, studio personnel
- Drew Jurecka – string arrangement

== Charts ==
Chart (2020)	Peak position
Ireland (IRMA)	61
New Zealand Hot Singles (RMNZ)	9
Scotland Singles (OCC)	71

== Certifications ==
Region	Certification	Certified units/sales
Brazil (Pro-Música Brasil)	Gold	20,000^{‡}
Canada (Music Canada)	Gold	40,000^{‡}
^{‡} Sales+streaming figures based on certification alone.

== Release history ==
Region	Date	Format	Label	Ref.
Various	January 1, 2020	Digital download; streaming	Republic	
