= Bloom (Machine Gun Kelly album) =

Studio album by Machine Gun Kelly
- Released: May 12, 2017
- Genres: Alternative hip hop; pop
- Length: 45:56
- Labels: EST 19XX; Bad Boy; Interscope
- Producers: SlimXX; Baze; H*Money; Edgar "JV" Etienne; The Runners; Lil Rich; The Monarch; Happy Perez; Sonny Digital; The Futuristics; Jesse Shatkin

Machine Gun Kelly chronology
General Admission (2015)	Bloom (2017)	Binge (2018)

Singles from Bloom
- 1. "Bad Things" Released: October 14, 2016; 2. "At My Best" Released: March 17, 2017; 3. "Trap Paris" Released: May 12, 2017; 4. "Go for Broke" Released: June 27, 2017; 5. "The Break Up" Released: December 15, 2017; 6. "27" Released: April 21, 2018

Bloom is the third studio album by American musician Machine Gun Kelly. It was released on May 12, 2017, by Bad Boy, Interscope Records, and EST 19XX. The album was preceded by the hit single, "Bad Things", a collaboration with Camila Cabello that peaked at number four on the Billboard Hot 100. The album features guest appearances from Quavo, Hailee Steinfeld, Ty Dolla Sign, James Arthur, and Cabello.

== Singles ==
On October 14, 2016, "Bad Things", featuring a duet with Cuban-American singer Camila Cabello, was released as the lead single from Bloom. The song peaked at number 4 in the United States and number 16 in the United Kingdom.

The second single from the album, "At My Best", featuring American singer Hailee Steinfeld, was released on March 17, 2017. It peaked at number 60 on the US Billboard Hot 100.

Originally released as a promotional single on April 13, 2017, "Trap Paris", featuring Quavo and Ty Dolla Sign, was released as the third single for Bloom on May 12, 2017. Its accompanying video was directed by Ben Griffin and debuted on MGK's VEVO on June 7, 2017.

The fourth single from the album, "Go for Broke", featuring UK singer James Arthur, was named as the official theme for WWE SummerSlam 2017 and sent to top 40 radio on June 27, 2017.

The fifth single from the album, "The Break Up", was released on December 15, 2017. The music video, directed by Jordan Wozy, was released on February 14, 2018.

"27", the sixth single, was released April 21, 2018 (a day before Kelly's 28th birthday). Its music video was released the same day.

== Commercial performance ==
Bloom debuted at number eight on the US Billboard 200 with 57,000 album-equivalent units, of which 38,000 were pure album sales. In its second week, the album dropped to number 29 selling 16,500 total album-equivalent units; and in its third week, the album dropped to 43, selling another 11,000 album equivalent units. As of early June 2017, the album had sold a total of 85,000 units.

== Critical reception ==
Professional ratings
Aggregate scores
Source	Rating
Metacritic	72/100
Review scores
Source	Rating
AllMusic	3/5 stars
Alternative Press	3.5/5 stars
HipHopDX	4/5
XXL	L (3/5)

Bloom received generally positive reviews from music critics. On Metacritic, which assigns a normalized rating out of 100 from reviews from mainstream critics, gave the album an average score of 72 out of 100 based on 4 reviews. In a positive review, Preezy of XXL praised the growth seen between General Admission and Bloom. He praised both the lyrical content and production on the album. However, he was critical of the fact that the album was not strong enough to be his big comeback after the critical failure of General Admission. In a positive review, Aaron McKrell of HipHopDX gave the album a 4/5, and praised Kelly's vocal delivery on the album, along with the production and lyrical content. Dan Leroy of Alternative Press gave the album 3.5 out of 5 stars. He stated that Kelly's vocals were amazing and his lyrics seemed sincere, but that it felt like listening to more of a persona than to an attempt to address a sometimes messy life. In a mixed review, Neil Z Yeung of AllMusic gave the album 3 stars, stating the half of the songs on the album were made to be radio hits, and that it was toned down from Kelly's previous two albums. However, he said the introspective maturity of the album was admirable.

== Track listing ==
Bloom track listing
No.	Title	Writer(s)	Producer(s)	Length
1.	"The Gunner"	Colson Baker; Brandon Allen; S. Basil	slimXX; Baze	3:38
2.	"Wake + Bake"	Baker; Harmony Samuels; Edgar Etienne	H*Money; Edgar "JV" Etienne	3:03
3.	"Go for Broke" (featuring James Arthur)	Baker; Jessie Reyez; James Arthur; Andrew Harr; Jermaine Jackson; Andre Davidson; Sean Davidson; Alex Delicata	The Runners; The Monarch; Delicata	3:30
4.	"At My Best" (featuring Hailee Steinfeld)	Baker; Benjamin Levin; Henrik Michelsen; Edvard Førre Erfjord; Rachel Moulden; Nathan Perez	Happy Perez	3:19
5.	"Kiss the Sky"	Baker; B. Allen	slimXX	3:07
6.	"Golden God"	Baker; B. Allen; Basil; Earl Johnson II	JP Did This 1; slimXX; Baze	3:18
7.	"Trap Paris" (featuring Quavo and Ty Dolla Sign)	Baker; Sonny Uwaezuoke; Tyrone Griffin, Jr.; Quavious Marshall	Sonny Digital	3:23
8.	"Moonwalkers" (featuring DubXX)	Baker; Enoch Harris III; Eric Allen	Lil Rich	3:05
9.	"Can't Walk"	Baker; Samuels; Etiene	H*Money; JV; MGK (add.)	3:05
10.	"Bad Things" (with Camila Cabello)	Baker; Camila Cabello; Madison Love; Tony Scalzo; Joe Khajadourian; Alex Schwartz	The Futuristics	3:59
11.	"Rehab"	Baker; Nico Sereba; Vincent Dery; Samuels; Etiene	H*Money; JV; MGK (add.)	4:26
12.	"Let You Go"	Baker; B. Allen; Basil; Jesse Shatkin	Shatkin; MGK (co.); slimXX (co.); Baze (co.)	3:05
13.	"27"	Baker; B. Allen; Basil	slimXX; Baze; MGK	4:58
Total length:				45:56

Reissue bonus tracks
No.	Title	Writer(s)	Producer(s)	Length
14.	"The Break Up"	Baker; Patterson; Allen; Wells; Cook	Music MajorX; Remy	3:20
15.	"Habits"	Baker; R. Eadeh; Basil; AJ Tyus	Ramibeatz; Baze	3:20
Total length:				52:36

== Charts ==
=== Weekly charts ===
Weekly chart performance for Bloom
Chart (2017)	Peak position
Australian Albums (ARIA)	37
Austrian Albums (Ö3 Austria)	36
Belgian Albums (Ultratop Flanders)	77
Belgian Albums (Ultratop Wallonia)	176
Canadian Albums (Billboard)	6
Czech Albums (ČNS IFPI)	12
Dutch Albums (Album Top 100)	58
Finnish Albums (Suomen virallinen lista)	37
French Albums (SNEP)	151
German Albums (Offizielle Top 100)	43
Irish Albums (IRMA)	52
New Zealand Albums (RMNZ)	26
Norwegian Albums (VG-lista)	29
Scottish Albums (Official Charts)	35
Slovak Albums (ČNS IFPI)	12
Swiss Albums (Schweizer Hitparade)	28
UK Albums (Official Charts)	37
US Billboard 200	8
US Top R&B/Hip-Hop Albums (Billboard)	3

=== Year-end charts ===
Year-end chart performance for Bloom
Chart (2017)	Position
US Top R&B/Hip-Hop Albums (Billboard)	79

== Certifications ==
Certifications for Bloom
Region	Certification	Certified units/sales
United States (RIAA)	Platinum	1,000,000^{‡}
^{‡} Sales+streaming figures based on certification alone.
