= Afterlife (Hailee Steinfeld song) =

2019 song by Hailee Steinfeld

Single by Hailee Steinfeld
- Released: September 19, 2019
- Genre: Synth-pop; trap
- Length: 3:28
- Label: Republic
- Songwriters: Hailee Steinfeld: Kennedi Lykken; Mikkel Eriksen; Stephen Kozmeniuk; Tor Erik Hermansen
- Producers: Stargate; Koz; Tim Blacksmith (exec.); Danny D (exec.)

Hailee Steinfeld singles chronology
"Woke Up Late" (2019)	"Afterlife" (2019)	"Wrong Direction" (2020)

Music video
- "Afterlife" on YouTube

"Afterlife", alternatively titled, "Afterlife (Dickinson)", is a song by American singer-songwriter Hailee Steinfeld, being released as a single in promotion of the Apple TV+ original series Dickinson, also starring Steinfeld in the lead role. It was released on September 19, 2019, by Republic Records.

== Background ==
The song was released on September 19, 2019. It serves as a single from the soundtrack of the Apple TV series Dickinson, which also stars Steinfeld as renowned poet Emily Dickinson. Steinfeld announced the song via her social media accounts on September 14, 2019.

"This record has become one of my favorite songs I’ve worked on and sonically, it’s indicative of the direction I’m exploring with my new music. There’s a line in the song that says ‘immortality is bliss’ and its reminiscent of a lot of Emily’s poems, She lived during a time where women were forbidden from voicing their opinions and restricted in many ways, including how they dressed. I wanted the single art to reflect this idea too so the corset has an exaggerated cinch to represent how Emily in particular felt constricted and stifled."

— Steinfeld discussing the song,

== Music videos ==
The Hannah Lux Davis-directed music video premiered on Steinfeld's YouTube channel on September 30, 2019, via YouTube premiere. Another video titled "For Your Consideration", featuring the cast of Dickinson and creator Alena Smith, was released on July 1, 2020.

== Credits and personnel ==
Credits adapted from Tidal.

- Hailee Steinfeld – vocals, backing vocals, songwriting
- Stargate – production
- Koz – production, songwriting, bass, drums, engineering, studio personnel, synthesizer programming
- Tim Blacksmith – executive production
- Danny D – executive production
- Kennedi Lykken – songwriting
- Mikkel Eriksen – songwriting, engineering, studio personnel
- Tor Erik Hermansen – songwriting
- Ira Grylack – engineering, studio personnel
- Thomas Warren – engineering, studio personnel
- Matty Green – mixing, studio personnel

== Charts ==
Chart (2019)	Peak position
Canada Digital Songs Sales (Billboard)	48
New Zealand Hot Singles (RMNZ)	7
US Digital Song Sales (Billboard)	43
US Pop Digital Song Sales (Billboard)	20

== Release history ==
Region	Date	Format	Label	Ref.
Various	September 19, 2019	Digital download, streaming	Republic	
