= Hailee Steinfeld =

American actress and singer (born 1996)

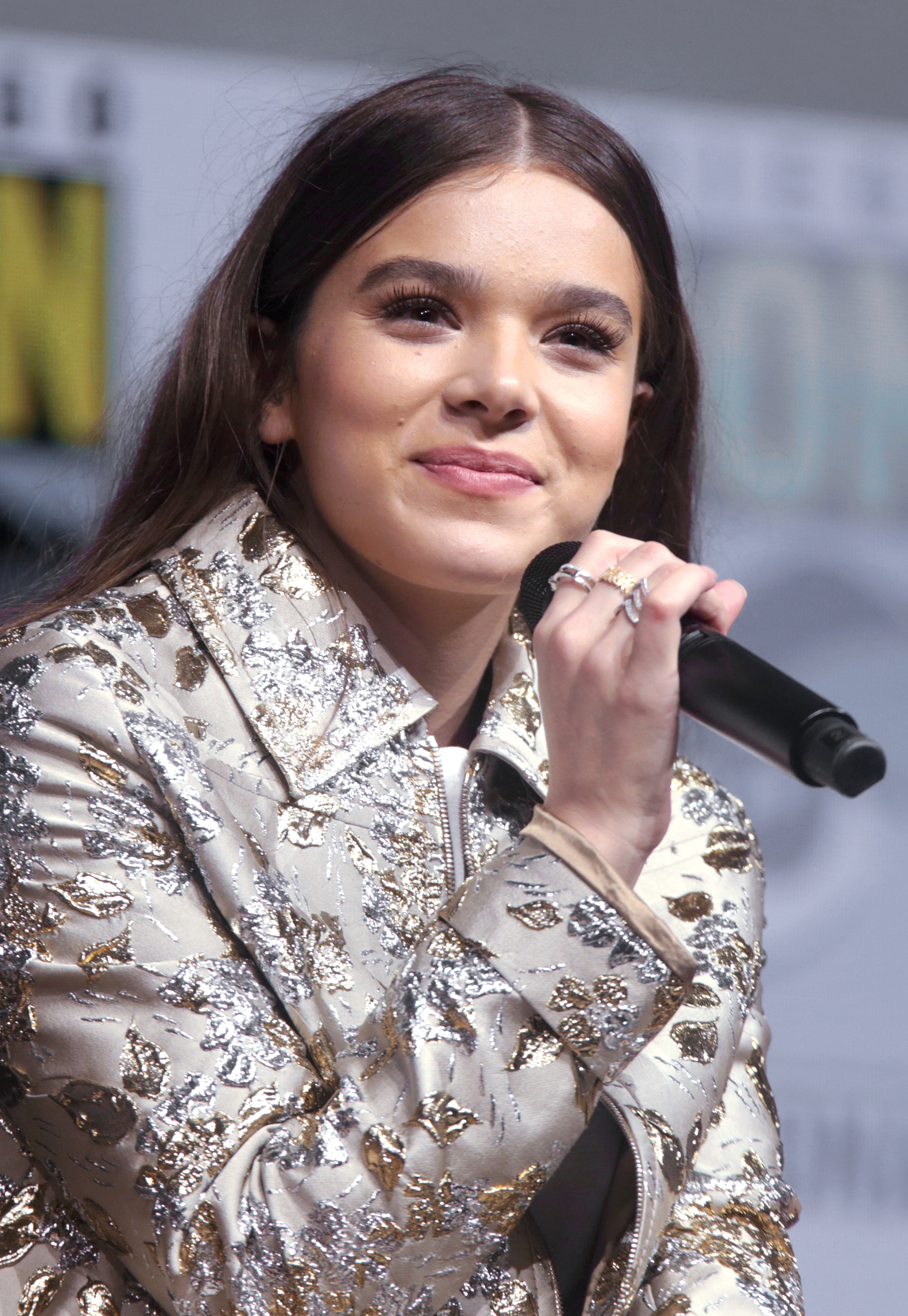
- Steinfeld at the 2018 San Diego Comic-Con
- Born: December 11, 1996 (age 29); Los Angeles, California, U.S.
- Occupations: Actress; singer
- Years active: 2007–present
- Works: Discography
- Spouse: Josh Allen (m. 2025)
- Children: 1
- Relatives: Jake Steinfeld (uncle); True O'Brien (cousin)
- Awards: Full list
- Musical career
- Genres: Pop; dance-pop
- Instrument: Vocals
- Label: Republic
- Website: haileesteinfeldofficial.com

Hailee Steinfeld (born December 11, 1996) is an American actress and singer. She had her breakthrough with the western film True Grit (2010), which earned her various accolades, including nominations for an Academy Award, a BAFTA Award, a Critics' Choice Movie Award and an Actor Award.

Steinfeld gained wider recognition for her roles in the Pitch Perfect film series (2015–2017) and The Edge of Seventeen (2016), which earned her a Golden Globe nomination. She has also starred in Ender's Game (2013), Begin Again (2013), Bumblebee (2018), and Sinners (2025). She voiced Gwen Stacy in Spider-Man: Into the Spider-Verse (2018) and its 2023 sequel, Vi in the Netflix series Arcane (2021–2024), and Billie Doe in the Disney animated film Hexed (2026). She has portrayed Emily Dickinson in the Apple TV+ series Dickinson (2019–2021), and Kate Bishop in the Marvel Cinematic Universe.

Steinfeld gained recognition in music after performing "Flashlight" in Pitch Perfect 2 (2015). Signing with Republic Records soon after, she released her debut single, "Love Myself", followed by the extended plays Haiz (2015) and Half Written Story (2020). She has gone on to release several critically and commercially successful singles including "Starving", "Most Girls", and "Let Me Go".

== Early life and education ==
Hailee Steinfeld was born on December 11, 1996, in the Tarzana neighborhood of Los Angeles, California, the younger of two children of Cheri (née Domasin), an interior designer, and Peter Steinfeld, a personal trainer. She has an older brother, Griffin. Her paternal uncle is fitness trainer and actor Jake Steinfeld, and her maternal granduncle is former child actor Larry Domasin. Her maternal first cousin, actress True O'Brien, appeared in a television commercial when Steinfeld was eight years old, which inspired her to pursue acting.

Steinfeld's father is Jewish and her mother is Christian, and she has said that she "celebrate[s] it all." Her maternal grandfather, Ricardo Domasin, was of Filipino (from Panglao, Bohol) and African American heritage. Steinfeld was raised in Agoura Hills and later in Thousand Oaks, California, and attended Ascension Lutheran School, Conejo Elementary, and Colina Middle School. She was home-schooled from 2008 until her high school graduation in June 2015.

== Career ==
=== 2007–2015: Breakthrough and critical recognition ===
Steinfeld began acting at age 10; she appeared in several short films, including playing the role of Talia Alden in the award-winning She's a Fox. Steinfeld was chosen for the role of Mattie Ross in True Grit when she was 13. The film was released internationally in December 2010; Richard Corliss of Time magazine called her performance one of the Top 10 of 2010, and wrote that Steinfeld "delivers the orotund dialogue as if it were the easiest vernacular, stares down bad guys, wins hearts. That's a true gift". Reviews from Roger Ebert, the Los Angeles Times, and Rolling Stone were also complimentary. The role earned Steinfeld a nomination at the 83rd Academy Awards for an Academy Award for Best Supporting Actress; it went to Melissa Leo. In May 2011, five months after True Grit was released, she was chosen to be the new face of Italian designer brand Miu Miu.

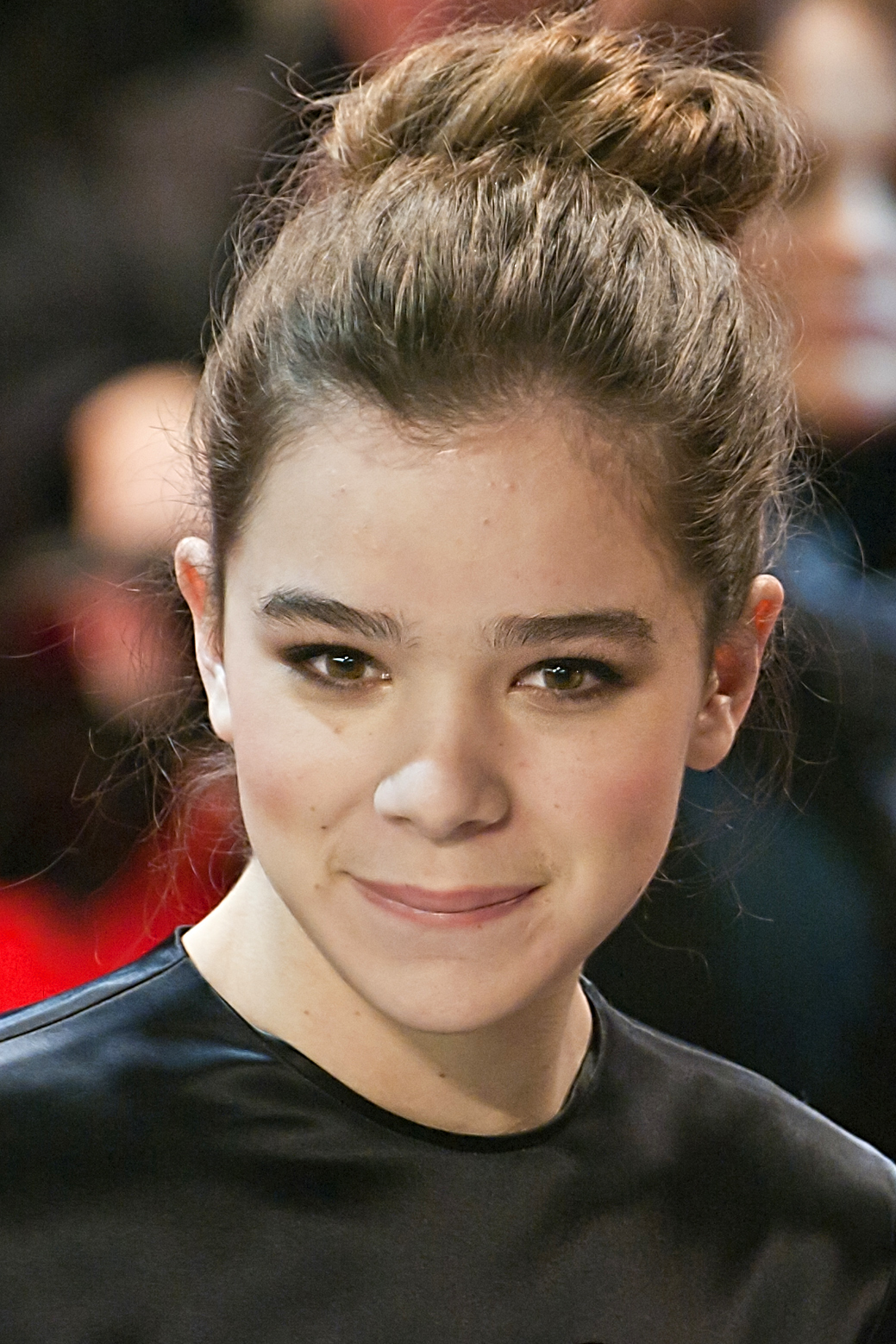
Steinfeld at the 61st Berlin International Film Festival in February 2011

In 2011, Steinfeld was cast at age 14 to play Juliet in a 2013 adaptation of Romeo and Juliet. The role was originally intended for a 22-year-old actress; there was concern about nudity in the film, but its director explained that when Steinfeld was cast, the script was changed to make it age-appropriate. The film was released in October 2013 to poor reviews in the United States and internationally. Steinfeld starred as Petra Arkanian in Ender's Game, a science-fiction action-adventure film based on the book by Orson Scott Card. The film was released on November 1, 2013.

Steinfeld played Violet, one of the supporting characters in the romance-drama Begin Again. The film was given a limited release in the United States on June 27, 2014, grossing $134,064 on its opening weekend; it opened in wide release on July 11. It was re-released by The Weinstein Company on August 29. Paramount Pictures closed a deal in 2011 for the screen rights to the Cat Patrick novel Forgotten and announced that she would play London Lane in a project yet to be filmed as of 2025. In 2014, Steinfeld was announced to star as Min Green in a screen adaptation of Daniel Handler's romantic-comedy book Why We Broke Up, but as of 2022, the film had not gone into production.

Steinfeld was cast as Eliza opposite Ender's Game co-star Asa Butterfield in the film adaptation of Ten Thousand Saints, which premiered on January 23, 2015, at the 2015 Sundance Film Festival. Steinfeld was originally cast to play the female lead in the 2015 film, For the Dogs, but was replaced by actress Emma Roberts. In spring 2014, Steinfeld narrated as the voice of Anne Frank for an exhibition on Frank at the Museum of Tolerance. In October, she was cast to star as Hadley in The Statistical Probability of Love at First Sight, based on the novel of the same name by Jennifer E. Smith. But when that film was released in 2023, Haley Lu Richardson was starring. Steinfeld was announced in January 2015 as the star of the film adaptation of Carrie Pilby, the young adult novel by Caren Lissner; she left the project due to scheduling conflicts. In March, Steinfeld was one of the voice actors for the English-language dub of the Japanese animated film When Marnie Was There. Steinfeld plays Anna Sasaki alongside Kiernan Shipka as Marnie. In April 2015, Steinfeld was cast in a lead role in Break My Heart 1000 Times, based on the YA novel by Daniel Waters. Scott Speer was set to direct, but the film has not been made as of 2022.

Steinfeld starred as the Trinity in the music video for "Bad Blood" by Taylor Swift featuring Kendrick Lamar. The video premiered at the 2015 Billboard Music Awards ceremony on May 17, 2015, and won a MTV Video Music Award for Video of the Year. Steinfeld starred in limited-release movie Barely Lethal. The movie was directed by Kyle Newman and was released on May 29, 2015. Steinfeld co-starred in Pitch Perfect 2, alongside Anna Kendrick, Rebel Wilson, and Elizabeth Banks, who also directed. She played some of her songs for a representative from Republic Records at an event in New York City, and the label signed her. In May, Republic Records announced the record deal and that Steinfeld was working on her first release.

=== 2015–2018: Established actress and musical projects ===
In July 2015, Steinfeld and singer Shawn Mendes released an acoustic version of Mendes' single, "Stitches". The following month, Steinfeld released her debut single, "Love Myself", with Republic Records. The song garnered media attention for its empowering message as well as suggestive lyrics that led media outlets to dub the song an "ode to masturbation". The song debuted on the Billboard Pop Songs chart at number 27 (peaking at 15), marking the highest debut for a solo female artist on the chart in 17 years, since Natalie Imbruglia's "Torn" in 1998. Steinfeld's debut extended play, Haiz (a nickname used by her fans), was released in November 2015. Haiz was produced by Mattman & Robin and features co-writers Julia Michaels and Justin Tranter. The EP was released to generally positive reviews. In February 2016, Steinfeld released a remixed version of "Rock Bottom", as the second single featuring American funk pop band DNCE. Steinfeld's next single, "Starving", was released in July 2016. The song is a collaboration with Grey featuring Zedd and became her biggest hit to date going platinum in Italy, New Zealand, Sweden, United Kingdom and the United States, while also going double platinum in Australia and triple platinum in Canada.

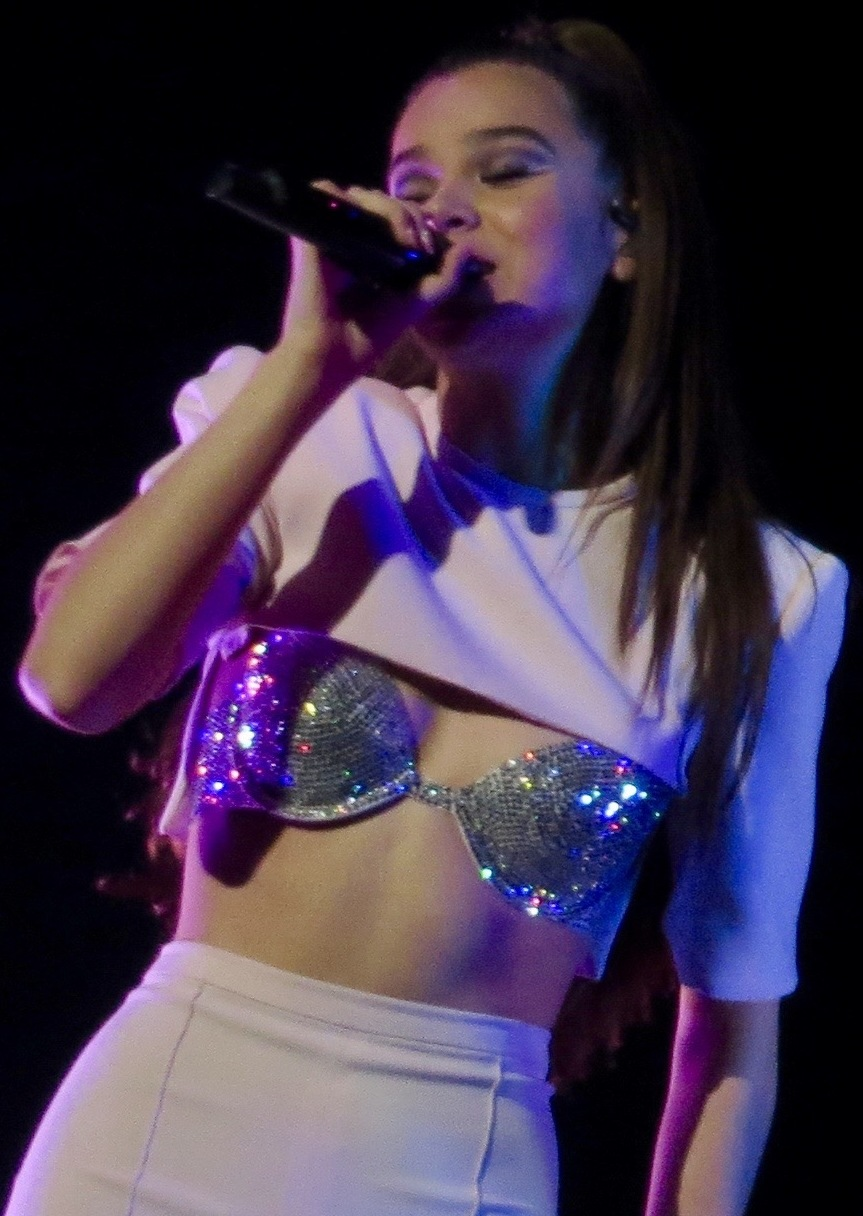
Steinfeld during Katy Perry's 2018 Witness: The Tour

In September 2016, Steinfeld played the lead role in The Edge of Seventeen, a coming-of-age comedy co-starring Blake Jenner, Woody Harrelson and Kyra Sedgwick, and written and directed by Kelly Fremon Craig. The film was released on November 18, 2016, to positive reviews; Steinfeld's performance was praised and earned her a Golden Globe Award nomination.

In early 2017, Steinfeld featured on two songs: "Show You Love" and "Digital Love". In March, Steinfeld was featured on American rapper Machine Gun Kelly's single "At My Best" taken from his third studio album Bloom. A month later, Steinfeld released her next single "Most Girls". The song received positive reviews and peaked at number 58 on the Billboard Hot 100 chart in the United States. Steinfeld performed the song live for the first time at the 2017 Radio Disney Music Awards on April 29. A music video was released and received praise for its message of embracing individuality. Steinfeld also reprised her role as Emily Junk in Pitch Perfect 3 (2017). In September 2017, Steinfeld released the single "Let Me Go", a collaboration with Swedish record producer Alesso featuring Florida Georgia Line and Andrew Watt, which reached number 14 on the Mainstream Top 40 chart. That same month she featured on the remix of "Plot Twist" by Marc E. Bassy.

On January 12, 2018, Steinfeld released "Capital Letters" for the soundtrack to the film Fifty Shades Freed. The song was received with positive reviews and peaked at number 12 on the Bubbling Under Hot 100 Singles chart. In March 2018, Steinfeld revealed that she is "wrapping up" work on her debut studio album. She performed at Indonesian Choice Awards in Jakarta, Indonesia the next month. Steinfeld then featured the song "Colour" with MNEK on June 1. In September, she was featured on Logic's album, YSIV, on the song "Ordinary Day" and on Chic's album, It's About Time on the song "Dance with Me". In late 2018, Steinfeld starred in the Transformers spin-off film Bumblebee, and provided the voice of Spider-Gwen in the Academy Award-winning animated film Spider-Man: Into the Spider-Verse. In November, her song "Back to Life" was released as a single from the Bumblebee soundtrack. That same month, hosted and performed at 2018 MTV Europe Music Awards in Bilbao, Spain.

=== 2019–present: Ongoing projects and Marvel Cinematic Universe ===
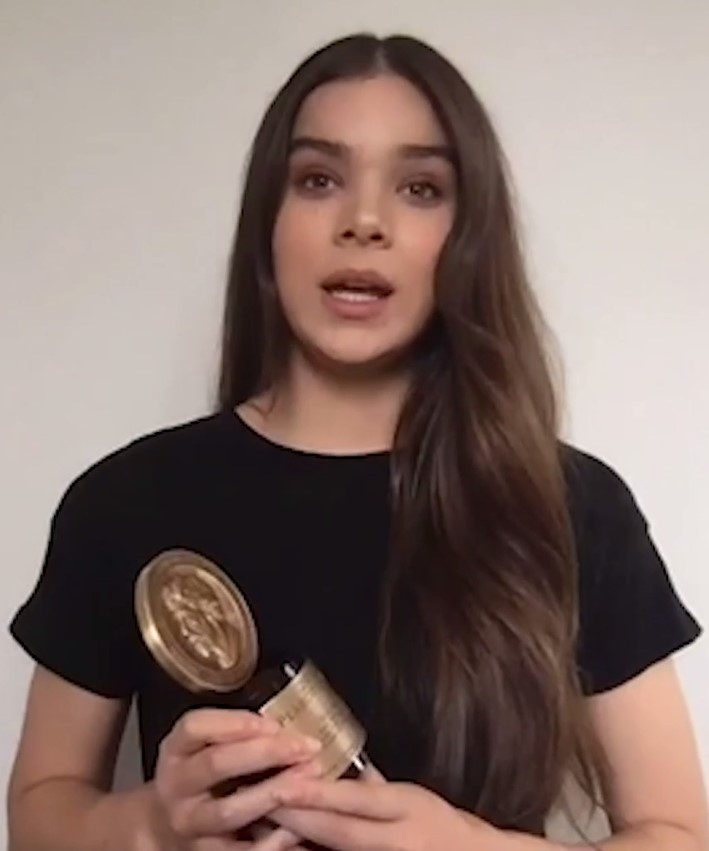
Steinfeld holding the Peabody Award received by Dickinson in 2020

At the end of 2018, Steinfeld was cast to star as Emily Dickinson in the Apple TV+ period comedy series Dickinson. The show aired on November 1, 2019. To promote the show, Steinfeld released "Afterlife" which featured on the show's first-season finale. The show ran for three seasons. In 2020, the show won a Peabody Award, making Dickinson the first show from Apple TV+ to win the prestigious honor.

In January 2019, Steinfeld featured on the remix of "Woke Up Late" by Drax Project. In August 2019, Steinfeld featured on the music video for Benny Blanco and Juice Wrld's single "Graduation". She also appeared in a cameo as one of the recruited Angels in the 2019 film Charlie's Angels, and also made an appearance on Between Two Ferns: The Movie. Steinfeld released two singles in 2020, "Wrong Direction" and "I Love You's". The tracks acted as the first and second singles, respectively, from her EP Half Written Story, which was released on May 8, 2020. The EP received mixed reviews with critics praising Steinfeld's vocals, confidence and vulnerability but panning the music. On May 28, 2020, Steinfeld released a single with Taiwanese singer Chen Linong, titled "Masterpiece".

In December 2020, Steinfeld was cast as Kate Bishop / Hawkeye in the Disney+ Marvel Cinematic Universe series Hawkeye. The show premiered on November 24, 2021, and consisted of six episodes. Her role received positive reviews from critics. Steinfeld is set to reprise the role in future films, noting that she has signed a multi-project deal. Steinfeld also voiced Violet "Vi" in the adult animated show Arcane which was released on November 20, 2021. The show is set in the League of Legends universe. A second season premiered November 9, 2024.

In April 2022, Steinfeld teased a song titled "Coast". Marking two years since she last released music, "Coast" was released on July 28, 2022, and was "a euphoric, guitar-and-percussion-driven single", featuring American rapper Anderson .Paak. A music video premiered on Facebook on November 9, 2022. An acoustic version was released on December 7, 2022. In March 2023, Steinfeld released "SunKissing" which Rolling Stone described as a "vibey, electric guitar-backed pop earworm". Steinfeld reprised her voice role as Spider-Gwen in Spider-Man: Across the Spider-Verse (2023). She also made a cameo appearance as Kate Bishop in the MCU film The Marvels (2023). At the end of 2024, Steinfeld voiced an alternate version of Bishop in the third season of the Disney+ animated series What If...? episode "What If... 1872?".

In April 2025, Steinfeld appeared in Ryan Coogler's film Sinners (2025) alongside Michael B. Jordan and Wunmi Mosaku. Steinfeld portrayed Mary, a mixed-race woman in 1932 Jim Crow-era Mississippi whose ancestry mirrored Steinfeld's own African-American heritage. She also contributed the song "Dangerous" to the film's soundtrack, after having taken a break from recording music. In September 2025, she voiced another alternate version of Kate Bishop in the Disney+ adult animated MCU series Marvel Zombies.

==== Upcoming projects ====
Steinfeld is set to voice Billie in the upcoming Disney animated film Hexed (2026). She contributed a cover of "Magic" by The Cars to the film's soundtrack. Steinfeld is set to reprise her role as Spider-Gwen in Spider-Man: Beyond the Spider-Verse (2027). It was reported in July 2025 that Steinfeld would also star alongside Miles Teller in Paramount's Winter Games.

== Artistry and media reception ==
=== Musical and acting styles ===
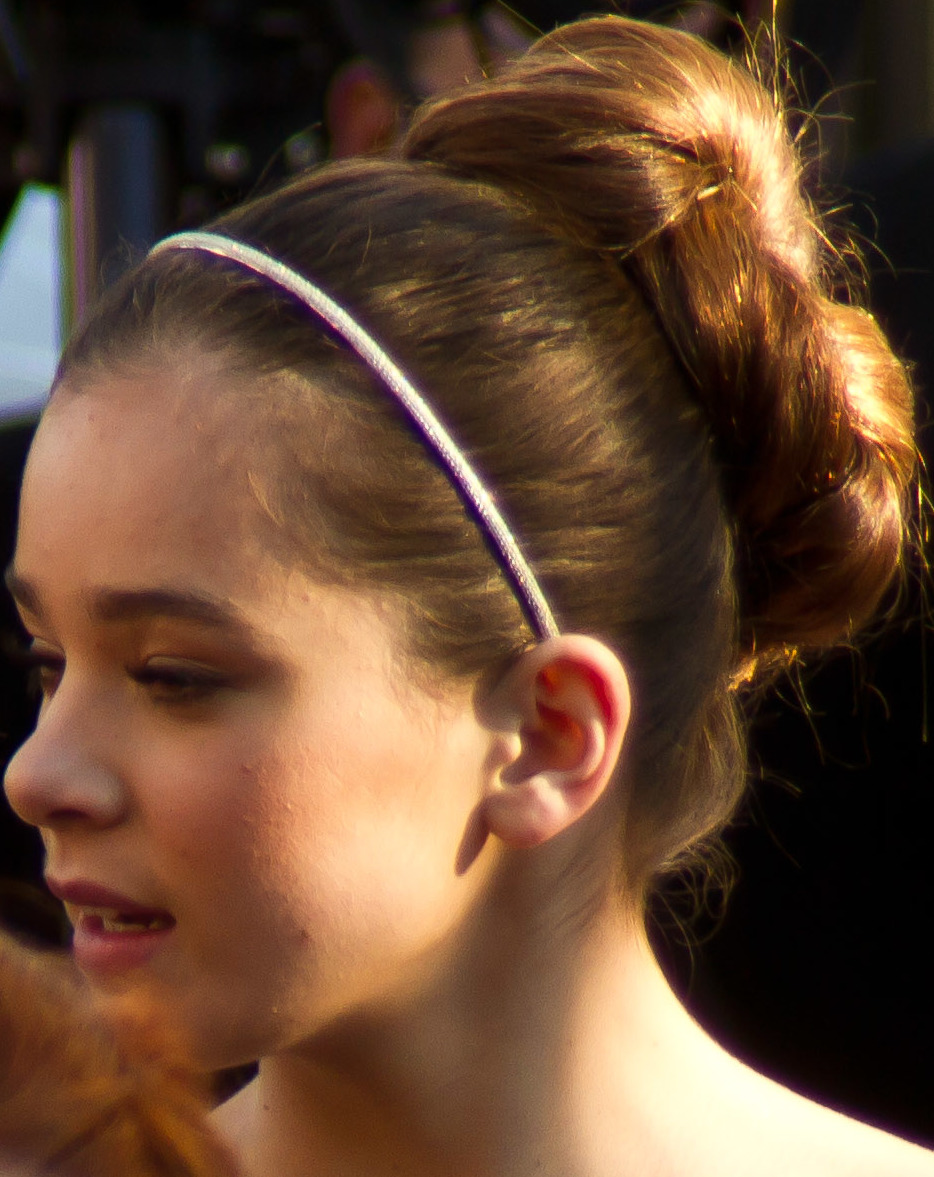
Steinfeld at the 83rd Academy Awards, where she was nominated for Best Supporting Actress

V magazine writer Dylan Kelly called Steinfeld an "artist of ambidexterity, showcasing supremacy across an impressive repertoire of on-screen roles in film and television", and said "her musical prowess is one of melodic self-growth and good-natured, lyrical wisdom".

Steinfeld said in a 2016 interview, "With [my] music, I feel like I get to be myself, tell my own story, and take my life experiences and not put them into another story but into my own words." She went on to say that "music is such a big influence in [her] acting" and that the two "entwine". Variety writer Natalie Weiner stated that Steinfeld has long been injecting "some vague notion of female empowerment [...] into her music". Self-love is a common theme Steinfeld has looked at within her music.

Steinfeld has stated that she hopes to be remembered as "an artist that truly cared about the art". She went on to note the "differences between working on a film set and in a studio are multiple", and adding that "she loves the freedom of making music".

There's something so freeing about going into a studio. It doesn't matter what time of day it is, doesn't matter what you're wearing or whether you're wearing make-up or not. You go into a room with people that you love and you feel comfortable with, and can be yourself around and be vulnerable and open up and talk about experiences. Magic happens in those moments.

=== Influences ===
Steinfeld has cited Madonna and Rihanna as her biggest musical influences. Other artists Steinfeld has cited as influences include Britney Spears, Tori Kelly, Selena Gomez, Bruno Mars and Justin Timberlake. Steinfeld noted their "strength, courage and their ability to go out [...] and express themselves". She has also said that she grew up listening to Boyz II Men and Luther Vandross due to her mother's love for them.

== Other work ==
=== Endorsements ===
Outside of her projects in the acting and music industry, Steinfeld has embarked on other ventures. She has been involved in marketing initiatives throughout her career and endorsed numerous brands including Prada, Balmain, and Louis Vuitton. In 2017, Steinfeld began to represent Reef Footwear and MISSION Activewear. In 2018, her line of eyewear called Privé Revaux was launched. In 2022, Steinfeld released "Coast" which coincided with the promotion of her newest role as a brand ambassador for CORE Hydration, promoting the company's "Find Your Core" campaign.

=== Philanthropy ===
Steinfeld has endorsed a variety of charities, including numerous organizations with a focus on improving children's lives. The list of charities endorsed by her includes: "What's Your Mission?", a charitable initiative with mission apparel and an accessories brand, "No Kid Hungry", a charity working to eradicate child hunger in the United States, WE Movement, The Ryan Seacrest Foundation, Make-A-Wish Foundation, and others. On the set of True Grit, Steinfeld created a "swear jar"; every time someone uttered the word "fuck", Steinfeld would collect $5 from the perpetrator, while other vulgarities were worth a dollar. As a trade-off, she had to pay up 50 cents if she said "like". She stated she "matched it and donated it all to an Alzheimer's foundation".

Steinfeld has made several public appearances during charity events, such as the Breast Cancer Foundation's 2014 Hot Pink Party, the iHeartRadio Jingle Ball 2015 tour, and We Day 2019 in California. In 2016, Steinfeld participated in singing "Santa Claus Is Coming to Town" with fellow singers and celebrities. The single raised money to aid New York City's homeless during the holiday season through Robin Hood, a New York City charity which targets poverty.

Steinfeld alongside the cast of the Pitch Perfect film series reunited to record an a cappella cover of Beyoncé's track "Love On Top", which was released in August 2020. The proceeds from the song went to UNICEF to help children in Lebanon and around the world.

In 2024, Steinfeld launched a newsletter titled Beau Society, "to connect with her audience on a deeper level".

== Accolades ==
In 2011, Steinfeld was nominated for an Academy Award for Best Supporting Actress for her performance in the 2010 film True Grit, making her one of the youngest actresses to be nominated in the category. She also received nominations for a BAFTA Award for Best Actress, a SAG Award and a Critics' Choice Movie Award for Best Supporting Actress for the same film. In 2016, she was nominated for a Golden Globe Award for Best Actress for The Edge of Seventeen. Steinfeld has also won awards for her music, including a 2017 Billboard Music Award for Top Covered Artist for her song "Most Girls".

== Personal life ==
Steinfeld dated Instagram celebrity Cameron Smoller from 2016 to 2017 and Irish singer Niall Horan from 2017 to 2018.

Steinfeld and Buffalo Bills quarterback Josh Allen began dating in May 2023. They went public with their relationship in July 2024. Allen proposed to Steinfeld on November 22, 2024, and they publicly announced their engagement one week later. They married on May 31, 2025, in California. On December 12, 2025, the couple announced via Instagram that they were expecting their first child together. Steinfeld announced the birth of their daughter, Harper Haize Allen, on April 2, 2026.

== Filmography ==
=== Film ===
Key
†	Denotes films that have not yet been released

Year	Title	Role	Notes	Ref.
2008	Heather: A Fairytale	Heather	Short film	
2009	She's a Fox	Talia Alden	Short film	
2010	Without Wings	Allison	Short film	
2010	Summer Camp	Shayna Matson	Television film	
2010	Grand Cru	Sophie	Short film	
2010	True Grit	Mattie Ross		
2013	Hateship, Loveship	Sabitha		
2013	Begin Again	Violet Mulligan		
2013	The Magic Bracelet	Angela	Short film	
2013	Romeo & Juliet	Juliet Capulet		
2013	Ender's Game	Petra Arkanian		
2014	3 Days to Kill	Zooey Renner		
2014	The Homesman	Tabitha Hutchinson		
2014	The Keeping Room	Louise		
2014	When Marnie Was There	Anna Sasaki	Voice; English dub	
2015	Ten Thousand Saints	Eliza Urbanski		
2015	Pitch Perfect 2	Emily Junk		
2015	Taylor Swift: The 1989 World Tour Live	Herself	Concert film	
2015	Barely Lethal	Megan Walsh		
2016	Term Life	Cate Barrow		
2016	The Edge of Seventeen	Nadine Franklin		
2017	Pitch Perfect 3	Emily Junk		
2018	Bumblebee	Charlie Watson		
2018	Spider-Man: Into the Spider-Verse	Gwen Stacy / Spider-Gwen	Voice	
2019	Between Two Ferns: The Movie	Herself		
2019	Charlie's Angels	Angel Recruit	Cameo	
2023	Spider-Man: Across the Spider-Verse	Gwen Stacy / Spider-Gwen	Voice	
2023	The Marvels	Kate Bishop / Hawkeye	Cameo	
2025	Sinners	Mary		
2025	Asteroid	Anna	Short film	
2026	Hexed †	Billie Doe	Voice	
2027	Spider-Man: Beyond the Spider-Verse †	Gwen Stacy / Spider-Gwen	Voice	

=== Television ===
Key
†	Denotes television productions that have not yet been released

Year	Title	Role	Notes	Ref.
2007	Back to You	Little Girl	Episode: "Gracie's Bully"	
2009	BrainSurge	Herself	Season 1, Episode 24	
2010	Sons of Tucson	Bethany Springs	Episode: "Chicken Pox"	
2015–2018	The Voice	Herself / Advisor	Guest (seasons 8, 15); advisor (season 14)	
2018	2018 MTV Europe Music Awards	Host / Performer	Television special	
2019–2021	Dickinson	Emily Dickinson	Main role, 30 episodes; also executive producer	
2020	Sesame Street	Herself	Guest (season 51)	
2021–2024	Arcane	Vi (Violet)	Voice, main role; 16 episodes	
2021	Hawkeye	Kate Bishop / Hawkeye	Main role, miniseries; 6 episodes	
2022	Marvel Studios: Assembled	Herself	Episode: "The Making of Hawkeye"	
2024	What If...?	Kate Bishop / Hawkeye	Voice; Episode: "What If... 1872?"	
2025	Marvel Zombies	Kate Bishop / Hawkeye	Voice; 2 episodes	

=== Music videos ===
Year	Title	Artist	Role	Ref.
2015	"Bad Blood"	Taylor Swift	The Trinity	
2012	"Endlessly"	The Cab	Symphony Soldier	

== Tours ==
Opening act

- Meghan Trainor – The Untouchable Tour (2016)
- Katy Perry – Witness: The Tour (2018)
- Charlie Puth – Voicenotes Tour (2018)

Festivals (various artists)

- Jingle Ball Tour 2015 (2015)
- Jingle Ball Tour 2016 (2016)

== See also ==
- List of oldest and youngest Academy Award winners and nominees
