= Let Me Go (Hailee Steinfeld and Alesso song) =

Single by Hailee Steinfeld and Alesso featuring Florida Georgia Line and Watt

from the EP Midnight Hour
- Released: September 8, 2017
- Genre: Tropical house; pop
- Length: 2:54
- Label: Republic
- Songwriters: Alessandro Lindblad; Andrew Watt; Alexandra Tamposi; Brian Lee; Jamie Lidell
- Producers: Alesso; Andrew Watt

Hailee Steinfeld singles chronology
"Most Girls" (2017)	"Let Me Go" (2017)	"Capital Letters" (2018)

Alesso singles chronology
"Move Like That" (2017)	"Let Me Go" (2017)	"Is That for Me" (2017)

Florida Georgia Line singles chronology
"Smooth" (2017)	"Let Me Go" (2017)	"Meant to Be" (2017)

Watt singles chronology
"Ghost in My Head" (2016)	"Let Me Go" (2017)	"Burning Man" (2017)

Music video
- "Let Me Go" on YouTube

"Let Me Go" is a song by American singer and songwriter Hailee Steinfeld and Swedish DJ and record producer Alesso, featuring American country music duo Florida Georgia Line and American singer-songwriter Watt. It was written by Ali Tamposi, Brian Lee, Jamie Lidell, Alesso and Watt, with production handled by the latter two. The song was released through Republic Records on September 8, 2017.

== Background ==
On September 5, 2017, Republic Records confirmed the forthcoming collaboration, and revealed its release and radio airplay date. On September 7, 2017, Steinfeld posted teasers on social media, officially announcing the song's release date.

== Composition ==
"Let Me Go" is a tropical house and pop song, with country influences. It is composed in the key of both B♭ dorian and A♭ major with a tempo of 100-104 beats per minute.

== Critical reception ==
David Rishty of Billboard called the song an "eye-popping collaboration", and felt it "has all the right ingredients for its lyrics to quickly get stuck in your head". Kat Bein of the same publication deemed it "a radio-ready pop ballad", "a feel-good breakup song with pop and country crossover". He opined that it "drips with tropical coconut notes with central vocals from Steinfeld and a strong backup from Florida Georgia Line", and sounds similar to Kygo's 2016 song "Carry Me". Brittany Provost of EDMTunes called it "a surprisingly very catchy and upbeat track". Kelly Brickey of Sounds Like Nashville felt it "bops like the next big club hit with FGL and Steinfeld trading off verses for an up-tempo love song".

== Credits and personnel ==
Credits adapted from Tidal.

- Hailee Steinfeld – vocals
- Alesso – songwriting, production, keyboard, percussion, programming
- Ali Tamposi – songwriting, background vocals
- Andrew Watt – songwriting, production, background vocals, bass, guitar, percussion
- Brian Lee – songwriting, background vocals
- Jamie Lidell – songwriting
- Johannes Raassina – engineering
- Brian Kelley – vocals
- Tyler Hubbard - vocals
- Serban Ghenea – mixing

== Charts ==
=== Weekly charts ===
Chart (2017–2018)	Peak position
Australia (ARIA)	12
Austria (Ö3 Austria Top 40)	52
Belgium (Ultratip Bubbling Under Flanders)	4
Belgium (Ultratip Bubbling Under Wallonia)	13
Canada Hot 100 (Billboard)	18
Canada CHR/Top 40 (Billboard)	13
Canada Hot AC (Billboard)	36
Czech Republic Singles Digital (ČNS IFPI)	18
Germany (GfK)	78
Hungary (Rádiós Top 40)	15
Hungary (Stream Top 40)	16
Ireland (IRMA)	18
Italy (FIMI)	69
Latvia (LaIPA)	24
Malaysia (RIM)	11
Mexico Airplay (Billboard)	47
Netherlands (Single Top 100)	33
New Zealand (Recorded Music NZ)	14
Norway (VG-lista)	40
Philippines (Philippine Hot 100)	51
Portugal (AFP)	27
Romania (Airplay 100)	63
Scottish Singles Sales (Official Charts)	30
Slovakia Singles Digital (ČNS IFPI)	20
Sweden (Sverigetopplistan)	35
Switzerland (Schweizer Hitparade)	60
UK Singles (Official Charts)	30
US Billboard Hot 100	40
US Adult Pop Airplay (Billboard)	25
US Hot Dance/Electronic Songs (Billboard)	2
US Pop Airplay (Billboard)	14
Venezuela (National-Report)	89

=== Year-end charts ===
Chart (2017)	Position
Australia (ARIA)	98
Hungary (Stream Top 40)	81
US Hot Dance/Electronic Songs (Billboard)	29

Chart (2018)	Position
Australia (ARIA)	59
Canada (Canadian Hot 100)	58
Iceland (Plötutíóindi)	53
US Hot Dance/Electronic Songs (Billboard)	6

=== Decade-end charts ===
Chart (2010–2019)	Position
US Hot Dance/Electronic Songs (Billboard)	33

== Certifications ==
Region	Certification	Certified units/sales
Australia (ARIA)	5× Platinum	350,000^{‡}
Brazil (Pro-Música Brasil)	2× Platinum	80,000^{‡}
Canada (Music Canada)	4× Platinum	320,000^{‡}
Denmark (IFPI Danmark)	Gold	45,000^{‡}
Germany (BVMI)	Gold	200,000^{‡}
Italy (FIMI)	Platinum	50,000^{‡}
New Zealand (RMNZ)	4× Platinum	120,000^{‡}
Portugal (AFP)	Gold	5,000^{‡}
Spain (Promusicae)	Gold	30,000^{‡}
United Kingdom (BPI)	Platinum	600,000^{‡}
United States (RIAA)	Platinum	1,000,000^{‡}
Streaming
Sweden (GLF)	2× Platinum	16,000,000^{†}
^{‡} Sales+streaming figures based on certification alone.^{†} Streaming-only figures based on certification alone.

== Release history ==
Region	Date	Format	Label	Ref.
Various	September 8, 2017	Digital download	Republic	
United States	September 12, 2017	Contemporary hit radio	Republic	
Italy	September 29, 2017	Contemporary hit radio	Universal	
