= Most Girls (Hailee Steinfeld song) =

Single by Hailee Steinfeld
- Released: April 28, 2017
- Genre: Pop
- Length: 3:24
- Label: Republic
- Songwriters: Hailee Steinfeld; Ryan Tedder; Zach Skelton; Tim Sommers; Jeremy Dussolliet; Asia Whiteacre
- Producers: Ryan Tedder; Zach Skelton; Kinetics & One Love; Chris O'Ryan (voc.)

Hailee Steinfeld singles chronology
"At My Best" (2017)	"Most Girls" (2017)	"Let Me Go" (2017)

Music video
- "Most Girls" on YouTube

"Most Girls" is a song recorded by American singer Hailee Steinfeld. It was released on April 28, 2017, by Republic Records. Steinfeld wrote the "female empowerment anthem" with Jeremy Dussolliet, Tim Sommers, Asia Whiteacre, and the record's co-producers, Ryan Tedder and Zach Skelton.

== Background and release ==
On April 24, Steinfeld revealed the cover and release date for "Most Girls" through her social media pages. The song is Steinfeld's first single as a lead artist since "Starving" in July 2016, following a number of collaborations released earlier in 2017. "Most Girls" was released to digital retailers worldwide on April 28, 2017. While it was made available for airplay immediately, its official impact date at American contemporary hit radio was May 2, 2017. Republic Records also serviced the song to hot adult contemporary stations on May 15, 2017.

== Critical reception ==
Jonathan Currinn of Outlet Mag wrote that the song's lyrics "are incredibly clever, really proving that Hailee Steinfeld has what it takes to inspire women," and also praised the "rhythmically groovy" but not over-produced beat. De Elizabeth of Teen Vogue called Steinfeld's vocals on the track "catchy," and wrote that "you'll want to be listening to this jam all weekend." Mike Wass of Idolator wrote that "Most Girls" is "as catchy as it is relatable and inspiring."

== Live performances ==
Steinfeld performed "Most Girls" live for the first time at 2017 Radio Disney Music Awards on April 29, 2017.

== Music video ==
The official music video for "Most Girls" was directed by Hannah Lux Davis and premiered May 23, 2017. The clip begins with Steinfeld rebuffing a man who claims she is "not like most girls". Throughout the majority of the video, Steinfeld "channels" various different personas, including a boxer, party girl, and a bookworm. Arielle Tschinkel of Idolator wrote that the video's premise emphasizes "that girls can be whoever they want to be". At the end of the video, Steinfeld is joined by a group of young women wearing T-shirts emblazoned with positive attributes such as "fearless" and "relentless".

While the video received praise for its message of embracing individuality, it also drew some criticism for its lack of diversity. "All of these girls are extremely thin and femme," writes Aimée Lutkin of The Muse-Jezebel, "so in reality most girls do not appear in this video."

== Charts ==
=== Weekly charts ===
Chart (2017)	Peak position
Australia (ARIA)	18
Belgium (Ultratip Bubbling Under Flanders)	33
Canada Hot 100 (Billboard)	42
Canada Hot AC (Billboard)	36
Czech Republic Airplay (ČNS IFPI)	24
Czech Republic Singles Digital (ČNS IFPI)	41
Ireland (IRMA)	29
Netherlands (Single Top 100)	76
New Zealand (Recorded Music NZ)	38
Philippines (Philippine Hot 100)	25
Portugal (AFP)	64
Scottish Singles Sales (Official Charts)	24
Slovakia Airplay (ČNS IFPI)	57
Slovakia Singles Digital (ČNS IFPI)	44
Sweden Heatseeker (Sverigetopplistan)	12
UK Singles (Official Charts)	34
US Billboard Hot 100	58
US Adult Pop Airplay (Billboard)	28
US Pop Airplay (Billboard)	26

=== Year-end charts ===
Chart (2017)	Position
Australia (ARIA)	62

== Certifications ==
Region	Certification	Certified units/sales
Australia (ARIA)	2× Platinum	140,000^{‡}
Brazil (Pro-Música Brasil)	Platinum	60,000^{‡}
Canada (Music Canada)	Platinum	80,000^{‡}
Denmark (IFPI Danmark)	Gold	45,000^{‡}
Italy (FIMI)	Gold	25,000^{‡}
New Zealand (RMNZ)	2× Platinum	60,000^{‡}
United Kingdom (BPI)	Platinum	600,000^{‡}
United States (RIAA)	2× Platinum	2,000,000
^{‡} Sales+streaming figures based on certification alone.

== Release history ==
Country	Date	Format	Version	Label	Ref.
Worldwide	April 28, 2017	Digital download	Original	Republic	
United Kingdom	April 28, 2017	Contemporary hit radio	Original	Island	
United States	May 2, 2017	Mainstream radio	Original	Republic	
United States	May 2, 2017	Top 40 radio	Original	Republic	
United States	May 15, 2017	Hot adult contemporary	Original	Republic	
Italy	July 14, 2017	Contemporary hit radio	Original	Universal	
Various	August 4, 2017	Digital download	Acoustic	Republic	
