= Valdés (surname) =

Origin
- Language: Spanish
- Meaning: from Val de Ese, Asturias
- Region of origin: Kingdom of León, Spain

Other names
- Alternative spelling: Valdez

Valdés is a Spanish toponymic surname of Asturian origin. Its appearance has been dated back to the times of the Reconquista in the municipality of Valdés, Asturias, where the eponymous lineage began. The area around the current town of Luarca was known as Val de Ese, "valley of the river Ese", as attested in medieval documents. This river would later be known as the Esva River. According to Luis de Valdés' Memorias (1622), the river itself took its name from the letter s (ese in Spanish) due to its similar shape, although this is considered unlikely.

During medieval times the surname was taken by many families living in the area around Luarca, which make is difficult to establish demarcations between families of the time. By the 14th century, the surname had spread throughout the Kingdom of Castile, and later all of the Iberian Peninsula. During the colonization of the Americas, the surname became established there, where many variations appeared, such as Valdez (by analogy with the Spanish patronymic -ez).

The French surname Valdès or Vaudès, from Peter Valdes, founder of the Waldensian religious movement, is unrelated to the Spanish surname. Instead, it derived from the Latin Valdesius, which referred to Vaulx-en-Velin, Lyon, his place of origin.

== People with the surname Valdés ==
- Aaron Valdes (born 1993), American basketball player
- Al Valdes (1935–2025), Canadian football player
- Amadito Valdés (born 1946), Cuban timbalero
- Antonio Valdés y Fernández Bazán (1744–1816), Spanish naval officer
- Basilio J. Valdes (1892–1970), Filipino general officer
- Bebo Valdés (1918–2013), Cuban pianist
- Carlos "Patato" Valdés (1926–2007), Cuban conga player
- Camila Ribeaux Valdes (born 2005), Cuban-Canadian singer and member of girl group Girlset
- Cayetano Valdés y Flores (1767–1834), Spanish naval officer and explorer
- Chucho Valdés (born 1941), Cuban pianist
- Fernando de Valdés y Llanos (1575–1639), Archbishop of Granada
- Fernando de Valdés y Salas (1483–1568), Spanish churchman and jurist
- Francisco Fellove Valdés (1923–2013), Cuban songwriter and singer
- Gabriel Valdés (1919–2011), Chilean politician
- Germán Valdés (1915–1973), Mexican actor, singer and comedian
- Gonzalo Fernández de Oviedo y Valdés (1478–1557), Spanish historian
- Hernán Valdés (born 1934), Chilean writer
- Hilda Magdalena Licerio Valdés (born 1993), Mexican politician
- Israel López Valdés (1918–2008), Cuban bassist and composer
- Jerónimo Valdés (1785–1855), Spanish general and governor of Cuba
- Jorge Luis Valdés (1961–2025), Cuban baseball player
- José Manuel Valdés (1767–1843), Peruvian physician and writer
- Juan Gabriel Valdés (born 1947), Chilean political scientist
- Juan de Valdés (1500–1541), Spanish religious writer
- Juan de Valdés Leal (1622–1690), Spanish painter
- Juan Meléndez Valdés (1754–1817), Spanish poet
- José Ramón Guizado Valdés (1899–1964), President of Panama 1955
- Lisandra Teresa Ordaz Valdés (born 1988), Cuban chess grandmaster
- Lisván Valdés (born 1988), Cuban basketball player
- Luchi Cruz-Valdes (born 1965), Filipina broadcast journalist
- Merceditas Valdés (1922–1996), Cuban singer
- Miguel Alemán Valdés (1902–1983), President of Mexico 1946–1952
- Orestes López Valdés (1908–1991), Cuban musician and composer
- Osiris Valdés López (born 1989), Cuban author
- Pedro Valdés (born 1973), Mexican baseball player
- Pedro de Valdés (1544–1615), Governor of Cuba 1600–1607
- Ramón Valdés (1923–1988), Mexican actor
- Ramón Maximiliano Valdés, President of Panama 1916–1918
- Roy Valdés (1920–2005), Cuban baseball player
- Tessa Prieto-Valdes (born 1963), Filipina columnist and media personality
- Víctor Valdés (born 1982), Spanish football goalkeeper
- Viengsay Valdés (born 1976), Cuban ballerina
- Zoé Valdés (born 1959), Cuban writer

Fictional characters

- Carlotta Valdes, character in the Hitchcock film Vertigo
- Cecilia Valdés, Cuban novel and zarzuela character
- Elpidio Valdés, Cuban comic character

== People with the surname Valdez ==
- Alyssa Valdez (born 1993), Filipina volleyball player
- Basil Valdez, (born 1951), Filipino balladeer
- César Valdez (born 1985), Dominican baseball player
- Chayito Valdez (1945–2016), Mexican musician and entertainer
- Claire Valdez (born 1989), American politician
- Cynthia Valdez (born 1987), Mexican rhythmic gymnast
- Erik Valdez (born 1979), American actor
- Fidel Valdez Ramos (1928–2022), President of the Philippines 1992–1998
- Framber Valdez (born 1993), Dominican baseball pitcher
- Joel Valdez (born 1999), American spokesman and Acting United States Department of Defense Press Secretary
- José Travassos Valdez (1787–1862), Portuguese soldier and statesman
- Juan Valdez, colonial governor of Texas 1714–1716
- Julio Valdez (1956–2022), Dominican professional baseball player and manager
- Kate Valdez (born 2000), Filipina actress
- Matías Valdez (born 1995), Uruguayan musician
- Nelson Haedo Valdez (born 1983), Paraguayan footballer
- Nickie Valdez (1940–2020), American LGBTQ activist
- Óscar Valdez (born 1990), Mexican professional boxer
- Óscar Valdez (footballer) (1946–2025), Spanish football player and manager
- Patssi Valdez (born 1951), American Chicana artist and founding member of the Asco art collective
- Phillips Valdéz (born 1991), Dominican baseball player
- Rodrigo Valdez (1946–2017), Colombian boxer
- Ronaldo Valdez (1947–2023), Filipino actor
- Sebastian Valdez (born 2002), American football player
- Vera Valdez (1936–2026), Brazilian model
- Wendy Valdez (born 1982), Filipina beauty queen, former reality star, and actress
- Wilmar Valdez (born 1965), Uruguayan football executive

Fictional characters

- Juan Valdez, a character appearing in advertisements for Colombian coffee
- Leo Valdez, a character appearing in novels by Rick Riordan
