= Valdez =

Valdez or Valdés may refer to:

== People ==
- Valdez (surname)
- Valdés (surname)
- Valdez (Brazilian footballer) (born 1943), a Brazilian former footballer
- Valdez Demings, U.S. politician
- Valdez Drexel "V.J." Edgecombe (born 2005), American basketball player.

== Geography ==
- Valdés, Asturias, Spain
- Valdez, Alaska, United States
  - Valdez oil terminal
- Valdez, Esmeraldas, Ecuador
- Valdez, Florida, United States
- Valdes Island, Canada
- Valdés Peninsula, Argentina

== Other uses ==
- Valdez, an acrobatic gymnastics variation of the back walkover
- Exxon Valdez, an oil tanker that ran aground and caused an oil spill in Alaska in 1989
  - Valdez Blockade, a protest by Alaskan fishermen in 1993
