= Valder =

Valder is a surname. Notable people with the surname include:

- John Valder (1931–2007), Australian politician
- Henry Valder (1862–1950), New Zealand businessman

== See also ==
- Alder (surname)
- IL Valder, a Norwegian sports club
- Valders, Wisconsin village
- Valdez (disambiguation)
