= Tweak (song) =

Single by Girlset
- Released: March 6, 2026
- Genre: Pop; R&B
- Length: 2:28
- Label: JYP; Republic
- Songwriters: Diego Avendano; Nathan DiRocco; Olufeyikemi Osuntokun; Brian Alexander Morgan
- Producers: Diego Avendano; J.Y. Park

Girlset singles chronology
"Little Miss" (2025)	"Tweak" (2026)	"Chat" (2026)

Music video
- "Tweak" on YouTube

"Tweak" is a song by girl group Girlset. It was released on March 6, 2026, through JYP Entertainment and Republic Records. The song marked the group's third single and samples "Weak" by the group SWV.

== Composition ==
Developed in collaboration with J.Y. Park, "Tweak" originated from a reimagining of the R&B track "Weak" by SWV. The final production blends vocal textures with individual creative input, distinguishing the finished track from its initial demo versions.

The group noted that the sample served as a play on words between "weak" and "tweak," changing the meaning while setting the track's tone. The song was described by the members as a "stupid boy anthem," as it centers on standing one's ground, setting boundaries against someone who tests your limits, and maintaining self-awareness while embracing an emotional yet empowered perspective.

== Background and release ==
Originally choreographed by Leejung Lee, the choreography for the music video was developed alongside former So You Think You Can Dance contestant Jasmine Mason.

Upon release, the song achieved Girlset's first No. 1 on iTunes Top Song charts in multiple overseas regions, including Mexico and Chile, while ranking 24th on the U.S. iTunes Top Song chart and 18th on the Pop Song chart. The audio recorded approximately 640,000 streams on Spotify on its first day—with over 270,000 plays in the U.S. alone, doubling their previous work "Little Miss." On Apple Music, it surpassed 180,000 streams globally on its release day.

== Live performances ==
To promote the single, Girlset appeared on iHeart KPOP with Jojo Live on March 7, 2026 to perform the track, followed by fan meetings in Los Angeles, San Francisco, and New York, alongside interviews with local radio stations.

== Music video ==
The official music video was released to the YouTube channel of JYP Entertainment. The video was directed by Hannah Lux Davis and featured a cameo appearance of company founder J.Y. Park playing the piano.

The video topped the YouTube Music Trending Worldwide chart on March 7, reached No. 1 in the U.S. and Canada, and peaked at No. 5 on YouTube's Trending Music chart in the U.S. It also surpassed 5.7 million views within 24 hours of release, securing a spot on YouTube's U.S. Daily Top 10 Popular Music Videos chart for March 6. On the morning of March 12, the music video officially surpassed 10 million views.

== Track listing ==
- Digital download and streaming
1. "Tweak" – 2:28
2. "Tweak" (En Español) – 2:29
3. "Tweak" (Piano) – 2:23
4. “Tweak” (Yung Bae Remix) - 2:31
5. “Tweak” (Acapella) - 2:25
6. “Tweak” (Instrumental) - 2:28

== Credits ==
Credits are adapted from Tidal

- Girlset - vocals, background vocals
- Diego Ave - Producer, Composer, Lyricist
- J.Y. Park - Producer, Composer, Lyricist
- Brian Alexander Morgan - Composer, Lyricist
- Olufeyikemi O Osuntokun - Composer, Lyricist
- Bill Zimmerman - Additional Engineer
- Mathew Hines - keyboard
- Chris Gehringer - Mastering Engineer
- Phil Tan - Mixing Engineer
- Sean Philan - Recording Engineer
- Kevin Brunhober - Recording Engineer
- Larry Gold - String Arranger

== Charts ==
Chart performance for "Tweak"
Chart (2026)	Peak position
US Digital Song Sales (Billboard)	22
New Zealand Singles Chart (RMNZ)	9

== Release history ==
Release dates and formats for "Tweak"
Region	Date	Format	Version	Label	Ref.
Various	March 6, 2026	Digital download; streaming	Original	JYP; Republic	
Various	March 9, 2026	Digital download; streaming	Singles	JYP; Republic	
