= Little Miss (Girlset song) =

Single by Girlset
- Released: November 14, 2025
- Genre: Pop; R&B
- Length: 2:24
- Label: JYP; Republic
- Songwriters: Alexander Lewis; Boy Matthews; Georgia Ku; Sara Diamond
- Producer: Alexander Lewis

Girlset singles chronology
"Commas" (2025)	"Little Miss" (2025)	"Tweak" (2026)

Missy Elliott singles chronology
"Fly Girl" (2023)	"Little Miss (Misdemeanor)" (2026)

Music video
- "Little Miss" on YouTube

"Little Miss" is a song by American girl group Girlset. It was released on November 14, 2025, through JYP Entertainment and Republic Records. It marked the group's second single following their rebrand as Girlset, three months after the release of "Commas".

== Background and release ==
Following the departure of KG and Kaylee from Vcha, the remaining members rebranded under the name Girlset in August 2025. The group released their first single as Girlset, "Commas", on August 29. On October 31, JYP Entertainment announced that they would be releasing their follow-up single "Little Miss" on November 14. Ahead of the release, Girlset unveiled music video and performance video previews to build anticipation, and posted a group teaser image on November 7. They revealed individual teaser photos on November 11, followed by additional concept photos the next day that conveyed the single's chic vibe. On January 23, 2026, Girlset released the remix version "Little Miss (Misdemeanor)" with American rapper Missy Elliott.

== Composition and lyrics ==
"Little Miss" is a "Y2K-flavored pop track with hip-hop edges" that showcases the group's "signature vocal prowess". Girlset member Kendall described the song as "leaning more into the 2000s R&B" lane. A hybrid of R&B and pop, its beat involves "rubbery bass, skittering percussion", and "fizzy, early-'00s synths." The space in the arrangement allows for the members to use "stacked harmonies, call-and-response hooks, and ad-libs that curl around the chorus", showing off "subtle runs and little melodic riffs."

== Live performances ==
On November 14, Girlset made their debut performance of "Little Miss" on the morning television program Good Day L.A.

== Music video ==
An accompanying music video was released on JYP Entertainment's YouTube channel alongside the single on November 14. Directed by Hannah Lux Davis, it shows the members of Girlset performing choreography through the city in Y2K-esque styling, flipping between "sharp hits and loose, swingy grooves." Upon release, the music video topped YouTube's global music video trending chart and fourth in the United States, and surpassed one million views in the first day.

== Track listing ==
- Digital download and streaming
1. "Little Miss" – 2:23
- Digital download and streaming – Remixes
1. "Little Miss" – 2:23
2. "Little Miss" (TCTS remix) – 2:24
3. "Little Miss" (Stephen Jusko and DK Blacklow remix) – 3:26
4. "Little Miss" (Paolo Cortez remix) – 2:34
5. "Little Miss" (Paolo Cortez holiday remix) – 2:38
- Digital download/streaming – Misdemeanor
1. "Little Miss (Misdemeanor)" (with Missy Elliott) – 2:24

== Credits and personnel ==
Credits are adapted from Tidal.

- Girlset – vocals, background vocals
- Alexander Lewis – composer, lyricist, producer
- Boy Matthews – composer, lyricist
- Georgia Ku – composer, lyricist
- Sara Diamond – composer, lyricist, background vocals
- Jake Prein – recording engineer
- Sara Phelan – recording engineer
- Josh Gudwin – mix engineer
- Chris Gehringer – mastering engineer
- Adam Grover – immersive mix engineer, immersive mastering engineer

== Charts ==
Chart performance for "Little Miss"
Chart (2025)	Peak position
New Zealand Hot Singles (RMNZ)	19

== Release history ==
Release dates and formats for "Little Miss"
Region	Date	Format	Version	Label	Ref.
Various	November 14, 2025	Digital download; streaming	Original	JYP; Republic	
Various	December 19, 2025	Digital download; streaming	Remixes	JYP; Republic	
Various	January 23, 2026	Digital download; streaming	Misdemeanor	JYP; Republic	
