= A2K =

A2K may refer to:

- Access to Knowledge movement
- A2K (America2Korea)
- A2K, a type of baseball glove sold by Wilson Sporting Goods
