= Dodree =

South Korean musical duo

Dodree 도드리
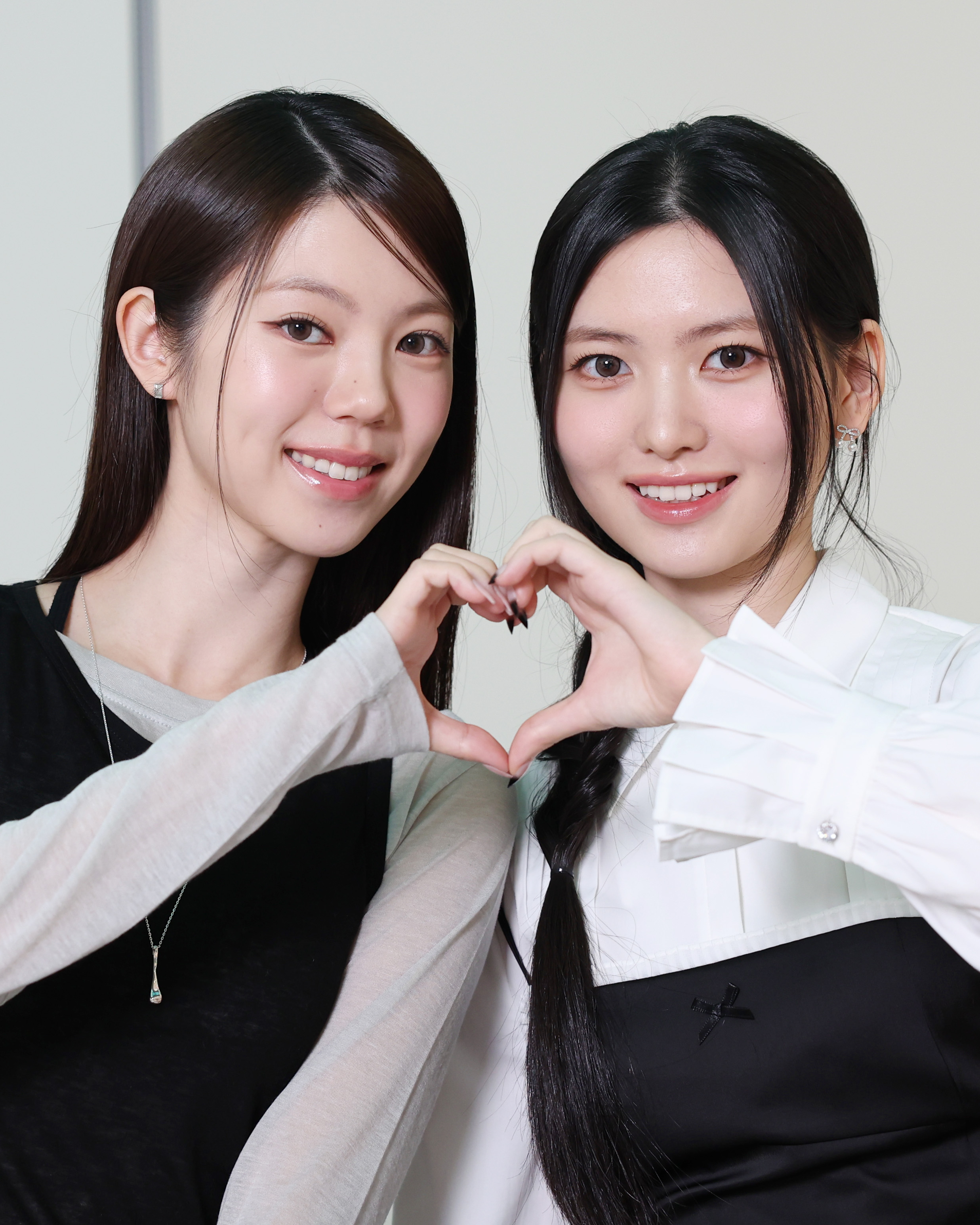
- Dodree in 2026; L–R: Yeong-joo, Song-hyun

Background information
- Origin: South Korea
- Genre: K-pop
- Years active: 2026–present
- Label: Innit Entertainment
- Members: Na Yeong-joo; Lee Song-hyun

Dodree (styled in all lowercase, Korean: 도드리) is a girl duo under Innit Entertainment, a subsidiary group of JYP Entertainment. The group consists of Na Yeong-joo and Lee Song-hyun. They made their debut on 21 January 2026 with the single "Just Like a Dream" (Korean: 꿈만 같았다; RR: kkuman gattanda).

The group name came from a portmanteau of "dodeuri jangdan" (Korean: 도드리장단), terms for traditional Korean music rhythm, and "free", symbolizes their desire to push the boundaries of musical genres and freely step onto the world stage.

== Members ==
- Na Yeong-joo (나영주) (born on February 21, 2001 (age 25))
- Lee Song-hyun (이송현) (born on October 28, 2004 (age 22))

== History ==
=== 2024–2025: Pre-debut and The Ddandara ===
Before forming as a duo, members Na Yeong-joo and Lee Song-hyun competed on KBS2's survival audition program The Ddandara (2024–2025), which was produced by Park Jin-young. In the final round, Lee placed fourth and Na placed fifth. During the competition, Na described herself as the "black sheep of a three-generation family of traditional Korean music (gugak) practitioners." Her final performance featured a cover of BabyMonster's "Sheesh" (2024), blending gugak vocal techniques, traditional drumming, and modern choreography. Lee performed Kim Soo-chul's "A Flower That Never Bloomed" (1983) in the fourth round, combining powerful vocals with traditional dance movements; Park Jin-young praised the performance as a "real-life version of Jeongnyeon," referencing the drama about a traditional female theater troupe.

=== 2026: Debut with "Just Like a Dream" ===
On January 6 and January 9, 2026, JYP Entertainment introduced Innit Entertainment trainees Na Yeong-joo and Lee Song-hyun via their official social media accounts, teasing an upcoming project. On January 13, Innit Entertainment officially launched the social media presence for their new female duo, Dodree, confirming the lineup of Na Yeong-joo and Lee Song-hyun. The announcement included a logo motion graphic depicting a butterfly transforming into mother-of-pearl textures, symbolizing the blend of tradition and modernity, and revealed that the group would debut with their first digital single, "Just Like a Dream," on January 21. Individual trailers released prior to the announcement highlighted Na’s deep vocal timbre and Lee’s performance skills, generating significant anticipation.

Ahead of their debut, Dodree announced a special collaboration with the National Museum of Korea on January 19, 2026. This partnership featured a teaser video for "Just Like a Dream," filmed within iconic museum spaces such as the "Room of Quiet Contemplation" and the Mirror Pond pavilion. The visuals blended historical settings with modern aesthetics, incorporating works by artist Kim Gyeong-hee and traditional Korean objects like mother-of-pearl wardrobes. The project also involved collaborations with niche genre specialists, including the global a cappella group Maytree, to emphasize Dodree's unique sonic identity.

Dodree officially released their debut digital single, "Just Like a Dream," on January 21, 2026, at 6 p.m. KST across major online music platforms. The single comprises two tracks: the title track "Just Like a Dream" and the B-side "Born (本)." "Just Like a Dream" is a pop ballad driven by guitar instrumentation, exploring themes of nostalgia and the contrast between cold reality and warm memories. "Born" combines cinematic pop elements with gugak, featuring lyrics that metaphorically describe a destined connection ("You are my 'bon', I am yours"), reflecting the team's origin and roots. The group's choreography integrates traditional Korean dance movements, such as drawing lines in the air, into modern routines, and they occasionally wear pul-chima (traditional long skirts) during performances. While some critics compared their K-pop and gugak fusion concept to the fictional group Huntr/x from the animated film KPop Demon Hunters (2025), the members stated their intention was not to mimic predecessors but to create their own distinct genre.

=== June 2026: Second single "Hawwah" ===
In May 2026, Dodree began performing at university festivals, starting with Gangnam University on May 14, followed by Seokyeong University and University of Seoul. They debuted unreleased material and confirmed preparations for a comeback album. On June 10, 2026, Innit Entertainment announced that Dodree would release their second digital single, "Hawwah", on June 24, marking their first return five months after debut. Promotional activities commenced with a trailer titled "Five Directions: Motion of Summer," utilizing traditional Korean imagery such as hanok architecture, folding screens, and dancheong patterns.

The lead-up to the single included a pre-release track, "Lilac," dropped on June 17 at 6 p.m. KST. Concept photos released on June 13 depicted the members in reinterpreted hanbok against a hanok backdrop. Musically, "Lilac" is a K- crossover Pop track fusing trap beats with the gayageum and Eastern instruments, employing traditional Korean vocal techniques. The lyrics compare shy yet bold affection to the lilac flower, notably reworking the melody of the Korean nursery rhyme "Ongdalsaem" in the chorus.

During the promotional period, the group executed a "color countdown" campaign based on the five traditional colors of Korea (obangsaek). From June 18 to June 22, visual teasers corresponding to blue, red, yellow, white, and black were unveiled sequentially, incorporating symbolic items like celadon vases, danggi hair ribbons, norigae pendants, and lotus leaves. An agency representative noted the goal was to expand the duo's musical world by "reinterpreting traditions with a contemporary sensibility."

Dodree released "Hawwah" on June 24, 2026. The three-track EP includes the title song "Hawwah (夏渦)," along with "Lilac" and "Seasonal Love Letters." The project explores universal themes of choice and desire, tracing an emotional arc from timid beginnings to intense longing. The title track uses the metaphor of a "summer whirlpool" to depict hidden desires evolving into conscious temptation. It blends dance elements with the group's signature K- crossover pop style, featuring gayageum riffs intertwined with dreamy synthesizer themes. The music video emphasizes water motifs and swirling movements, with costumes referencing hanbok in a fantastical setting. Upon release, the single gained attention on social media for its distinctive aesthetic, though general public recognition remained limited relative to product quality.

On July 6, 2026, Dodree released a jazz remix of "Hawwah" in collaboration with the jazz duo Oldie but Goodie, who draw inspiration from the golden age of jazz in the 1930s and 1940s. This release continued their series of cross-genre collaborations, following a city pop remix of "Lilac" previously released with artist Danpia.

== Discography ==
=== Singles ===
List of singles, showing year released, selected chart positions, and name of the album
Title	Year	Peak chart positions	Album
Title	Year	KOR DL	Album
"Just Like A Dream"	2026	156	Non-album singles
"Hawwah"	2026	148	Non-album singles
