= Hannah Lux Davis =

American music video and film director

- Lux Davis in 2015
- Born: May 17, 1986 (age 40); Bellevue, Washington, U.S.
- Occupations: Music video director; director; makeup artist; editor
- Years active: 2006–present
- Website: hannahluxdavis.com

Hannah Lux Davis (born May 17, 1986) is an American music video, commercial and film director. She is known for her work especially with female artists, such as Ariana Grande, Shakira, Katy Perry, Demi Lovato, Nicki Minaj, Miley Cyrus, Avril Lavigne, Christina Aguilera, Hilary Duff and Fifth Harmony.

== Biography ==
Davis was born and raised in Bellevue, Washington. In high school, she was diagnosed with exophoria, which hindered her ability to read and write. She left Seattle for Los Angeles at age 18, where she enrolled in the New York Film Academy, and the Los Angeles Film School a year later. For her final projects, she made music videos, and decided to pursue a career in the music video industry. Davis graduated from the Los Angeles Film School in 2006, and went into music video production. She worked for a time as a makeup artist after attending Cinema Makeup School in order to get on the sets of music videos, commercials, and feature films, and began making music videos in her spare time, paying the budgets out of her own pocket. The first video she was paid to direct was for Twin Atlantic in 2010. She has referenced Floria Sigismondi and Sophie Muller as two of her influences.

== Filmography ==
=== Film ===
Year	Title	Role	Distributor
2017	Demi Lovato: Simply Complicated	Director	YouTube
2019	Alex Morgan: The Equalizer	Director	ESPN+
2019	The Kacey Musgraves Christmas Show	Producer	Amazon Prime Video
2021	Demi Lovato: Dancing with the Devil	Co-executive producer	YouTube

=== Music videos ===
Year	Title	Artist	Roles
2006	"Beauty in the Breakdown"	The Scene Aesthetic	Director
2008	"Run Boy"	Boomkat	Director, editor
2008	"By All Means"	National Product	Director
2008	"20 Gauge Facelift"	Caecelia	Director, editor
2009	"Love Me or Hate Me"	Zoe Myers	Director
2010	"Human After All"	Twin Atlantic	Director
2010	"What is Light? Where is Laughter?"	Twin Atlantic	Director, editor, colorist
2010	"Like We Used to"	A Rocket to the Moon	Director, editor, colorist
2010	"The Crow and the Butterfly"	Shinedown	Director, editor, colorist
2010	"To Hell and Back"	Blessthefall	Director
2010	"I.D.G.A.F."	Breathe Carolina	Director, editor, colorist
2010	"BlackLight"	One Call	Hair stylist, make up artist
2011	"I'll Survive You"	BC Jean	Director, editor
2011	"Geronimo"	Aura Dione	Editor
2011	"Never Lookin’ Back"	Kenny Wayne Shepherd Band	Director
2011	"Brand New Bitch"	Anjulie	Director
2011	"Stand Behind the Music"	Anjulie	Director
2012	"Dancing with a Broken Heart"	Delta Goodrem	Director, editor
2012	"Beez in the Trap"	Nicki Minaj featuring 2 Chainz	Editor
2012	"Back 2 Life"	Sean Kingston	Editor
2012	"Sun Burns Down"	Jin Akanishi	Editor
2012	"Put Your Graffiti On Me"	Kat Graham	Editor
2012	"We In This"	DJ Drama	Editor
2012	"Take It To The Head"	DJ Khaled	Editor
2012	"2 Reasons"	Trey Songz	Editor
2012	"I Luv Dem Strippers"	2 Chainz	Editor
2012	"Hella Bad"	NiRè AllDai	Director, editor
2012	"Oath"	Cher Lloyd featuring Becky G	Director, editor
2012	"Rum and Raybans"	Sean Kingston featuring Cher Lloyd	Director, editor
2012	"Hard to Forget"	Tyler Blackburn and Anabel Englund	Director, editor, colorist
2012	"Believe It"	Cimorelli	Director
2013	"With Ur Love"	Cher Lloyd	Director, editor
2013	"Love Me"	Lil Wayne featuring Drake and Future	Director
2013	"Where You Are"	Jay Sean	Director
2013	"Crashing Down"	Kady Z	Director
2013	"Crazy Stupid Love"	My Crazy Girlfriend	Director
2013	"Tapout"	Rich Gang	Director
2013	"Inside Out"	NiRè AllDai	Director
2013	"Boomerang"	The Summer Set	Director
2013	"Homeless Romantic"	Itch featuring Adam Lazzara	Director, editor
2013	"I'm Out"	Ciara featuring Nicki Minaj	Director, editor
2013	"Miss Movin' On"	Fifth Harmony	Director
2013	"Me & My Girls"	Fifth Harmony	Director
2013	"We Been On"	Rich Gang featuring R. Kelly	Director
2013	"Vacation"	G.R.L.	Director
2013	"Marry Me"	Jason Derulo	Director
2013	"23"	Mike Will Made It featuring Miley Cyrus, Wiz Khalifa and Juicy J	Director, editor
2013	"Good Time"	Paris Hilton featuring Lil Wayne	Director
2013	"100 Flavors"	Rich Gang featuring Kendrick Lamar	Director
2014	"Famous"	Kelleigh Bannen	Director, editor
2014	"2 On"	Tinashe featuring Schoolboy Q	Director, editor
2014	"On My Way"	Lea Michele	Director
2014	"Marilyn"	Alexa Goddard	Director, editor
2014	"Come Alive"	Paris Hilton	Director
2014	"Bang Bang"	Jessie J, Ariana Grande and Nicki Minaj	Director
2014	"Burnin' Up"	Jessie J featuring 2 Chainz	Director
2014	"Love Me Harder"	Ariana Grande and The Weeknd	Director, editor
2014	"Fun"	Megan Nicole	Director
2014	"Can't Stop Dancin'"	Becky G	Director
2014	"Only"	Nicki Minaj featuring Drake, Lil Wayne and Chris Brown	Director, editor
2015	"I Bet"	Ciara	Director
2015	"Peaches N Cream"	Snoop Dogg featuring Charlie Wilson	Director
2015	"Como tú no hay dos"	Thalía & Becky G	Director
2015	"I'm Gonna Show You Crazy"	Bebe Rexha	Director
2015	"Sparks"	Hilary Duff	Director
2015	"High Off My Love"	Paris Hilton featuring Birdman	Director
2015	"Flashlight"	Jessie J	Director
2015	"Solo Parecía Amor"	Thalía	Director
2015	"Hey Mama"	David Guetta featuring Nicki Minaj, Bebe Rexha and Afrojack	Director
2015	"Good Thing"	Sage the Gemini featuring Nick Jonas	Director
2015	"The Night Is Still Young"	Nicki Minaj	Director
2015	"Bad Girls"	MKTO	Director
2015	"Heartbeat"	G.E.M.	Director
2015	"Cool for the Summer"	Demi Lovato	Director
2015	"Around the World"	Natalie La Rose featuring Fetty Wap	Director
2015	"Love Myself"	Hailee Steinfeld	Director
2015	"Lie"	Roya	Director
2015	"Focus"	Ariana Grande	Director
2015	"Stand by You"	Rachel Platten	Director
2015	"Bang My Head"	David Guetta featuring Sia and Fetty Wap	Director
2016	"Gold"	Kiiara	Director
2016	"Love Is the Name"	Sofia Carson	Director
2016	"Me Too"	Meghan Trainor	Director
2016	"Into You"	Ariana Grande	Director
2016	"This One's for You"	David Guetta featuring Zara Larsson	Director
2016	"Superlove"	Tinashe	Director
2016	"Side to Side"	Ariana Grande featuring Nicki Minaj	Director, editor
2016	"That's My Girl"	Fifth Harmony	Director
2016	"Body Moves"	DNCE	Director
2016	"Telepathy"	Christina Aguilera featuring Nile Rodgers	Director
2016	"Bad Things"	Machine Gun Kelly and Camila Cabello	Director
2017	"I'm a Lady"	Meghan Trainor	Director
2017	"Good Life"	G-Eazy & Kehlani	Director
2017	"At My Best"	Machine Gun Kelly featuring Hailee Steinfeld	Director
2017	"No Promises"	Cheat Codes featuring Demi Lovato	Director
2017	"Most Girls"	Hailee Steinfeld	Director
2017	"Power"	Little Mix featuring Stormzy	Director
2017	"Sorry Not Sorry"	Demi Lovato	Director
2017	"If I'm Lucky"	Jason Derulo	Director
2018	"For You"	Liam Payne and Rita Ora	Director
2018	"Capital Letters"	Hailee Steinfeld & BloodPop	Director
2018	"Friends"	Marshmello & Anne-Marie	Director
2018	"I Believe"	DJ Khaled featuring Demi Lovato	Director
2018	"Alone"	Halsey featuring Big Sean and Stefflon Don	Director
2018	"2002"	Anne-Marie	Director
2018	"Drug Addicts"	Lil Pump	Director
2018	"High Horse"	Kacey Musgraves	Director
2018	"Almost Love"	Sabrina Carpenter	Director
2018	"Don't Leave Me Alone"	David Guetta and Anne-Marie	Director
2018	"Legendary"	Disney Channel Stars	Director
2018	"Bottled Up"	Dinah Jane featuring Ty Dolla Sign and Marc E. Bassy	Director
2018	"Breathin"	Ariana Grande	Director, editor
2018	"Perfect to Me"	Anne-Marie	Director
2018	"Say My Name"	David Guetta, Bebe Rexha and J Balvin	Director
2018	"Thank U, Next"	Ariana Grande	Director
2019	"7 Rings"	Ariana Grande	Director, editor
2019	"Break Up with Your Girlfriend, I'm Bored"	Ariana Grande	Director
2019	"Rainbow"	Kacey Musgraves	Director
2019	“Only Want You”	Rita Ora featuring 6lack	Director
2019	"Thinkin Bout You"	Ciara	Director
2019	“Beauty Marks”	Ciara	Director
2019	"Nightmare"	Halsey	Director
2019	“Bounce Back”	Little Mix	Director
2019	"Boyfriend"	Ariana Grande and Social House	Director
2019	"Higher Love"	Kygo and Whitney Houston	Director
2019	"Don't Call Me Angel"	Ariana Grande, Miley Cyrus and Lana Del Rey	Director
2019	"Afterlife"	Hailee Steinfeld	Director
2020	"Birthday"	Anne-Marie	Director
2020	"No Shame"	5 Seconds of Summer	Director
2020	"Say So"	Doja Cat	Director
2020	"I Love Me"	Demi Lovato	Director
2020	"Old Me"	5 Seconds of Summer	Director
2020	"To Be Young"	Anne-Marie featuring Doja Cat	Director
2020	"Hole in the Bottle"	Kelsea Ballerini	Director
2020	"Be Kind"	Marshmello and Halsey	Director, editor
2020	"OK Not to Be OK"	Marshmello and Demi Lovato	Director, editor
2020	"Naked"	Ava Max	Director
2020	"Let's Love"	David Guetta and Sia	Director
2020	"Baby, I'm Jealous"	Bebe Rexha featuring Doja Cat	Director
2020	"Guess, I'm a Liar"	Sofia Carson	Director
2020	“OMG What’s Happening”	Ava Max	Director
2021	"Fool's Gold"	Sofia Carson	Director
2021	"Kiss My (Uh-Oh)"	Anne-Marie and Little Mix	Director, editor
2021	"Melon Cake"	Demi Lovato	Director
2021	"Good Ones"	Charli XCX	Director
2021	"I Hope Ur Miserable Until Ur Dead"	Nessa Barrett	Director
2021	"Bite Me"	Avril Lavigne	Director
2022	"When I'm Gone"	Alesso and Katy Perry	Director
2022	"Closer"	Saweetie (feat. H.E.R.)	Director
2022	"All 4 Nothing (I'm So in Love)"	Lauv	Director
2022	"Kids Are Born Stars"	Lauv	Director
2022	"Stranger"	Lauv	Director
2022	"Hot in It"	Tiësto and Charli XCX	Director
2023	"Bruises"	Reneé Rapp	Director
2023	"Baby Don't Hurt Me"	David Guetta, Anne-Marie and Coi Leray	Director
2023	"Barbie World"	Nicki Minaj and Ice Spice with Aqua	Director
2023	"Agora Hills"	Doja Cat	Director
2023	"When We Were Young (The Logical Song)"	David Guetta and Kim Petras	Director
2024	"Deeper Well"	Kacey Musgraves	Director
2024	"Doo Doom Chit"	VVUP	Director
2024	"Puntería"	Shakira and Cardi B	Director
2024	"BBA"	Paris Hilton featuring Megan Thee Stallion	Director
2024	"It’s OK I’m OK"	Tate McRae	Director
2025	"Hand That Feeds"	Amy Lee and Halsey	Director
2025	"Here All Night"	Demi Lovato	Director
2025	"Gone Gone Gone"	David Guetta, Teddy Swims and Tones and I	Director
2025	"Zoo"	Shakira	Director
2025	"Little Miss"	Girlset	Director
2026	"Tweak"	Girlset	Director
2026	"Hooligan"	BTS	Director
2026	"Nicole Kidman"	Adéla	Director
2026	"Dry Spell"	Kacey Musgraves	Director
2026	"Dai Dai"	Shakira and Burna Boy	Director
2026	"Agua"	Shakira and Maluma	Director
2026	"Young & Dumb"	Girlset	Director

== Awards and honors ==
Year	Category	Nominated work	Result	Ref.
2013	MTV Video Music Award for Best Hip-Hop Video	"Love Me" by Lil Wayne (featuring Drake & Future)	Won	
2014	MTV Video Music Award for Artist to Watch	"Miss Movin' On" by Fifth Harmony	Won	
2015	MTV Video Music Award for Best Collaboration	"Bang Bang" by Jessie J, Ariana Grande & Nicki Minaj	Nominated	
2015	MTV Video Music Award for Best Collaboration	"Love Me Harder" by Ariana Grande & The Weeknd	Nominated	
2016	MTV Video Music Award for Best Female Video	"Into You" by Ariana Grande	Nominated	
2016	MTV Video Music Award for Best Pop Video	"Into You" by Ariana Grande	Nominated	
2016	MTV Video Music Award for Best Editing	"Into You" by Ariana Grande	Nominated	
2016	MTV Video Music Award for Best Cinematography	"Into You" by Ariana Grande	Nominated	
2017	iHeartRadio Music Award for Best Music Video	"Side to Side" by Ariana Grande (featuring Nicki Minaj)	Nominated	
2017	MTV Video Music Award for Best Choreography	"Side to Side" by Ariana Grande (featuring Nicki Minaj)	Nominated	
2019	MTV Video Music Award for Best Direction	"Thank U, Next" by Ariana Grande	Nominated	
2019	MTV Video Music Award for Best Editing	"7 Rings" by Ariana Grande	Nominated	
2019	Country Music Association Award for Video of the Year	"Rainbow" by Kacey Musgraves	Won	
2020	MTV Video Music Award for Best Direction	"Say So" by Doja Cat	Nominated	
2020	MTV Video Music Award for Video For Good	"I Love Me" by Demi Lovato	Nominated	
2020	MTV Video Music Award for Best Visual Effects	"I Love Me" by Demi Lovato	Nominated	
2022	MTV Video Music Award for Push Performance of the Year	"I Hope Ur Miserable Until Ur Dead" by Nessa Barrett	Nominated	
