= A2K (TV program) =

2023 American talent competition web series

- Also known as: America2Korea
- Genre: Reality competition
- Created by: Monte Lipman; Park Jin-young
- Directed by: Kim Tae-wook (series); Some Production (music)
- Judges: Park Jin-young
- Theme music composer: Park Jin-young
- Opening theme: "Ready for the World"
- Country of origin: United States
- Original languages: English; Korean (spoken)
- No. of episodes: 22

Production
- Executive producers: Monte Lipman; Park Jin-young; Shin Hyun-kuk; Danielle Price Sanders; Devon Libran
- Production locations: United States; South Korea
- Editors: Kim Ja-saeng (visual); Jeong Min-soo (visual); Noh Jin-yeong (visual)
- Running time: 25–50 minutes
- Production companies: JYP Entertainment; Republic Records

Original release
- Network: YouTube
- Release: July 14 – September 22, 2023

Related
- Nizi Project

A2K (an abbreviation of America2Korea) is an American reality competition show that aired between July 14 and September 22, 2023 on YouTube. The series was a joint project between JYP Entertainment and Republic Records. The goal of the series was to create the first American girl group using the rigorous K-pop training system.

The series revolved around JYP Entertainment founder Park Jin-young as he picked members for an American girl group from the United States and Canada through an evaluation process.

The winning contestants from A2K went on to form the girl group VCHA.

On June 29, 2023, A2K was announced to be broadcast digitally through JYP Entertainment's YouTube channel from July 13, 2023, with new episodes being released on Mondays and Thursdays at 6:00 p.m. (PT) or 9:00 p.m. (ET). The series finale officially aired on September 22, 2023 at 6PM PT.

== Background ==
Following Republic and JYP's initial strategic partnership in 2020 with Twice, the collaboration was extended on February 10, 2022, to include JYP groups such Stray Kids and Itzy as part of the alliance.

On March 15, 2022, JYP Entertainment officially launched their North American label, JYP USA, following its expanded strategic collaboration with Republic Records.

On July 25, 2022, both J.Y. Park and the CEO of Republic Records, Monte Lipman made an official announcement in a virtual press video that was released via JYP Entertainment's YouTube channel. It was revealed at the end of the video that parents could submit the application on behalf of their child(ren). Five contestants from each audition city were selected to move on to the live audition stage. Contestants from the United States and Canada who were born between January 1, 2005, and September 1, 2010, were eligible to submit their applications to attend the audition in one of the five US cities that were held in September 2022.

City	Submission Deadline	In-Person Audition
Atlanta	September 3, 2022	September 10, 2022
Chicago	September 7, 2022	September 14, 2022
New York City	September 10, 2022	September 17–18, 2022
Dallas	September 13, 2022	September 20, 2022
Los Angeles	September 16, 2022	September 23–25, 2022

== Episodes ==
No.	Title	Filming Location(s)	Original release date
1	"The Start of A2K"	Dallas; Chicago	July 13, 2023
2	"Show Your Talent"	Chicago; Atlanta; New York City	July 17, 2023
3	"The Final Contestants"	Los Angeles	July 20, 2023
4	"The LA Boot Camp Begins"	Los Angeles	July 24, 2023
5	"Dance Evaluation Continues"	Los Angeles	July 27, 2023
6	"Show Your Passion"	Los Angeles	July 31, 2023
7	"Vocal Evaluation Starts"	Los Angeles	August 3, 2023
8	"Vocal Evaluation Rankings"	Los Angeles	August 7, 2023
9	"Star Quality Evaluation"	Los Angeles	August 10, 2023
10	"Star Quality Evaluation Rankings"	Los Angeles	August 14, 2023
11	"Character Evaluation"	Los Angeles	August 17, 2023
12	"Character Evaluation Rankings"	Los Angeles	August 21, 2023
13	"The Showcase Begins"	Los Angeles	August 24, 2023
14	"The Showcase Performances"	Los Angeles	August 28, 2023
15	"LA Boot Camp Rankings"	Los Angeles	August 31, 2023
16	"Korean Boot Camp Begins"	Seoul	September 4, 2023
17	"Individual Performances Continue"	Seoul	September 7, 2023
18	"Individual Evaluation Rankings"	Seoul	September 11, 2023
19	"Team Evaluation"	Seoul	September 14, 2023
20	"Team Evaluation Rankings"	Seoul	September 18, 2023
21	"The Grand Finale Begins"	Seoul	September 20, 2023
22	"The Final Members"	Seoul	September 21, 2023

== Contestants ==
Name		Birth Date (Age)	Residence
Stage	Full	Birth Date (Age)	Residence
Cristina	Cristina Lopez Sandiford	May 11, 2005	Atlanta, Georgia, U.S.
Melissa	Melissa Kadas	July 22, 2005	Brampton, Ontario, Canada
Lexus	Lexus Vang	November 22, 2005	Milwaukee, Wisconsin, U.S.
Savanna	Savanna Collins	July 26, 2006	Fort Lauderdale, Florida, U.S.
Kaylee	Kaylee Lee	November 24, 2009	Philadelphia, Pennsylvania, U.S.
Camila	Camila Ribeaux Valdes	August 10, 2005	Montreal, Quebec, Canada
Kendall	Kendall Ebeling	June 1, 2006	Fort Worth, Texas, U.S.
KG	KG Crown (Kiera Grace Madder)	June 17, 2007	Los Angeles, California, U.S.
Yuna	Yuna Gonzalez	April 28, 2005	California, U.S.
Gina	Gina De Bosschère	July 15, 2009	
Mischa	Mischa Salkin	August 2, 2009	Florida, U.S.

== Summary ==
Color key

- Got the stone after evaluations
- Got the stone after revaluation
- Got the stone later

						Phase 3					Outcome
Contestant	Dance	Vocal	Star Quality	Character	Overall	Individual	Team	Finale	Attitude	Overall	Outcome
Lexus	3	■	4	1	6	7	8	Won	1	1	Vcha
KG	8	3	■	■	8	3	6	Lost	–	2	Vcha
Camila	7	1	■	3	1	2	3	Won	3	3	Vcha
Savanna	4	■	3	4	4	5	4	Won	2	4	Vcha
Kaylee	6	6	■	■	7	4	1	Lost	–	5	Vcha
Kendall	2	5	2	■	5	1	7	Lost	4	6	Vcha
Cristina	1	■	■	2	3	6	2	Lost	No	Eliminated	
Gina	5	4	■	■	2	8	5	Won	No	Eliminated	
Yuna	■	■	5	5	10	9	9	Eliminated			
Melissa	■	2	1	■	9	Withdrawn (Note: Due to personal reasons, as broadcast in Ep. 16.)					
Mischa	No	■	■	No	11	Eliminated					

== Showcase ==
Team	Original artist(s)	Song	Contestants
Team A	Wonder Girls	"Be My Baby"	Camila
Team A	Wonder Girls	"Be My Baby"	KG
Team A	Wonder Girls	"Be My Baby"	Cristina
Team B	ITZY	"Wannabe"	Kendall
Team B	ITZY	"Wannabe"	Kaylee
Team B	ITZY	"Wannabe"	Savanna
Team B	ITZY	"Wannabe"	Mischa
Team C	TWICE	"The Feels"	Melissa
Team C	TWICE	"The Feels"	Lexus
Team C	TWICE	"The Feels"	Yuna
Team C	TWICE	"The Feels"	Gina

== Team Battle ==
Color key

- Eliminated

Team	Result	Original artist(s)	Song	Contestants
Marteami	3rd place	TWICE	"Alcohol-Free"	Lexus
Marteami	3rd place	TWICE	"Alcohol-Free"	Kendall
Marteami	3rd place	TWICE	"Alcohol-Free"	Yuna
Back Dawgz	2nd place	Stray Kids	"Back Door"	Camila
Back Dawgz	2nd place	Stray Kids	"Back Door"	Gina
Back Dawgz	2nd place	Stray Kids	"Back Door"	Cristina
SP3KTRUM	Won	NMIXX	"Love Me Like This"	KG
SP3KTRUM	Won	NMIXX	"Love Me Like This"	Savanna
SP3KTRUM	Won	NMIXX	"Love Me Like This"	Kaylee

== Final mission ==
=== Round 1 Individual song ===
Team	Result	Original artist(s)	Song	Contestants
TOPIC	Won	Original Song (Produced by JYP & David Stewart)	"Know Me Like That"	Gina
TOPIC	Won	Original Song (Produced by JYP & David Stewart)	"Know Me Like That"	Lexus
TOPIC	Won	Original Song (Produced by JYP & David Stewart)	"Know Me Like That"	Savanna
TOPIC	Won	Original Song (Produced by JYP & David Stewart)	"Know Me Like That"	Camila
Clover	Lost	Original Song (Produced by JYP & Space Primates)	"Go Getter"	Kaylee
Clover	Lost	Original Song (Produced by JYP & Space Primates)	"Go Getter"	Kendall
Clover	Lost	Original Song (Produced by JYP & Space Primates)	"Go Getter"	KG
Clover	Lost	Original Song (Produced by JYP & Space Primates)	"Go Getter"	Cristina

=== Round 2 Common Song ===
Color key

- Final member of Vcha
- Eliminated

Team	Result	Original artist(s)	Song	Contestants
Clover	Lost	Original Song (Produced by JYP & Cirkut)	"Y.O.Universe"	Kaylee
Clover	Lost	Original Song (Produced by JYP & Cirkut)	"Y.O.Universe"	Kendall
Clover	Lost	Original Song (Produced by JYP & Cirkut)	"Y.O.Universe"	KG
Clover	Lost	Original Song (Produced by JYP & Cirkut)	"Y.O.Universe"	Cristina
TOPIC	Won	Original Song (Produced by JYP & Cirkut)	"Y.O.Universe"	Gina
TOPIC	Won	Original Song (Produced by JYP & Cirkut)	"Y.O.Universe"	Lexus
TOPIC	Won	Original Song (Produced by JYP & Cirkut)	"Y.O.Universe"	Savanna
TOPIC	Won	Original Song (Produced by JYP & Cirkut)	"Y.O.Universe"	Camila

== See also ==
- Vcha
- Park Jin-young
- JYP Entertainment
- Republic Records
