= Valdez, Florida =

Valdez
- Unincorporated community
- Location within Volusia County
- Coordinates: 28°50′43″N 081°19′20″W
- Country: United States
- State: Florida
- County: Volusia
- Elevation: 16 ft (5 m)
- Time zone: UTC-5 (Eastern (EST))
  - Summer (DST): UTC-4 (EDT)
- enter ZIP code: 32713
- Area code: 386
- GNIS feature ID: 292722

Valdez is an unincorporated community located in southwest Volusia County, Florida, within the city limits of DeBary. Valdez is located along U.S. Highway 17-92 (Charles Richard Beall Blvd.) where it intersects with Barwick Road, just north of the St. Johns River.

== History ==
Valdez was named in honor of Antonio Valdez, the secretary of the Spanish navy in 1787, when the Spanish explored the area. He chose one of his protégés, Lt. Jose del Rio Cossa, to conduct an exploratory survey of Florida's naval store resources. In this survey, Cossa created an enormous map in which he renamed Lake George (now Lake Monroe) to Laguna Valdez. Although this name did not persist, pre-American land deeds referred to what is now Lake Monroe as Valdez.

In 1928, Florida Power & Light began constructing a power plant in Valdez on the north shore of the St. Johns river.

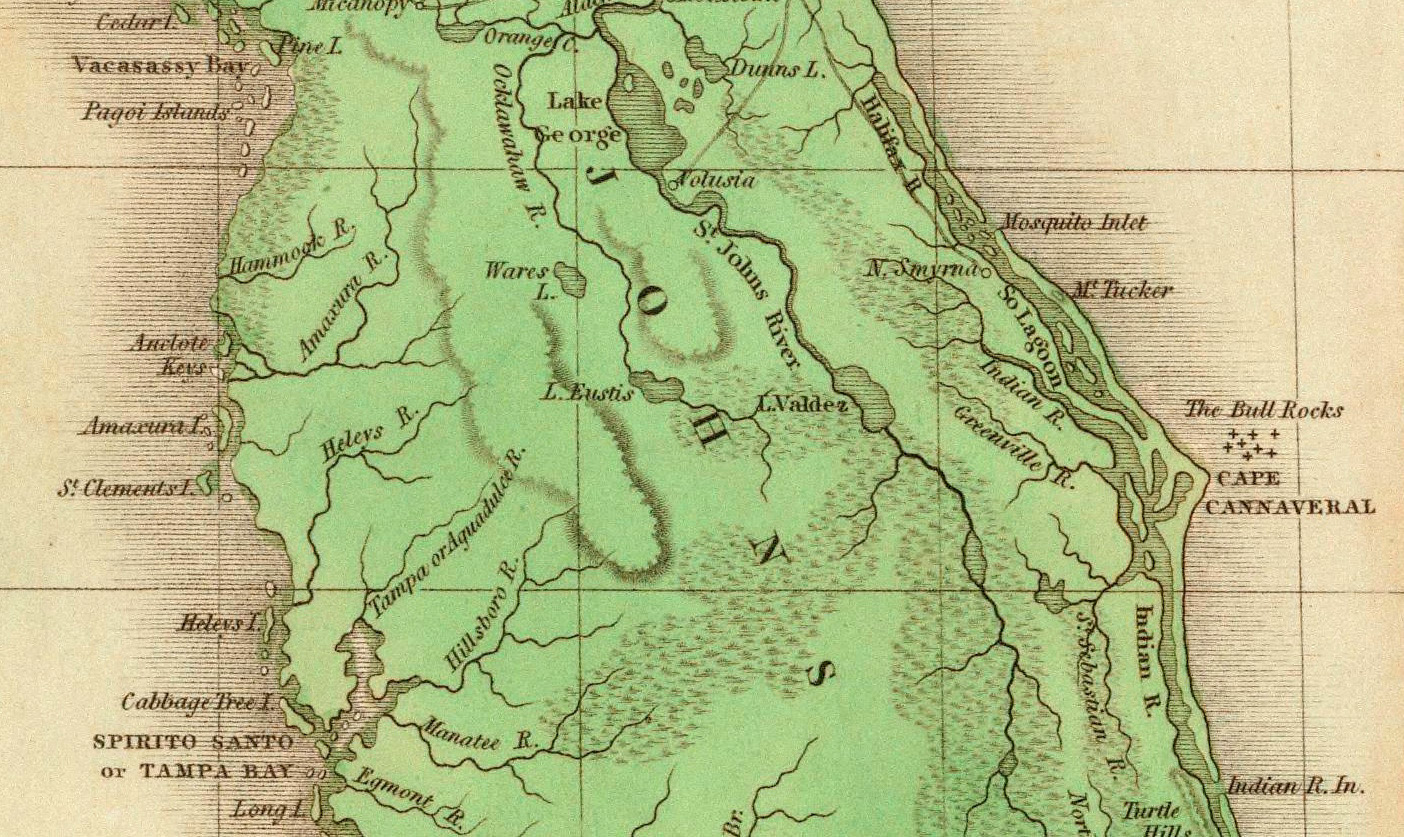
1826 Map of Central Florida showing Lake Valdez in place of what is now Lake Monroe
