= Matías Valdez =

Uruguayan singer and composer

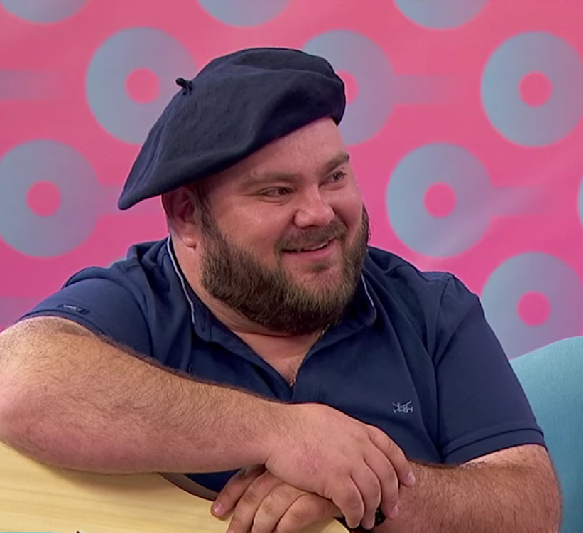
- Valdez in 2023
- Born: Matías Valdez Sastre; 29 April 1995 (age 29); Mendoza, Uruguay
- Occupations: Singer; composer
- Years active: 2021–present
- Musical career
- Genres: cumbia; Latin ballad; folk cumbia
- Instruments: Vocals; Guitar

Matías Valdez Sastre (Mendoza, Uruguay, 29 April 1995) is a Uruguayan singer and composer. In 2022 he reached the Top 10 in Spotify.

== Singles ==
- 2021: Nace un borracho
- 2021: No quiero ser tu amigo
- 2021: De Callados ft. Martín Piña
- 2021: Quédate
- 2021: Me enamoré ft. Valsi
- 2021: Latidos
- 2021: Me encanta ft. Lucas Sugo
- 2021: Volver a vernos
- 2022: Boleto al amor ft. Chacho Ramos
- 2022: Adiós ft. Gonzalo Castillo
- 2022: Lo quiero todo
- 2022: ¿A dónde vamos?
- 2022: Quiero un sí ft. Catherine Vergnes
- 2023: Yo solo quiero
- 2023: No te vayas ft. La Konga
- 2023: Ella
- 2023: Tu Despertador ft. Rodrigo Tapari
