= Girlset =

American girl group

- Girlset in 2026; L–R: Savanna, Kendall, Lexi and Camila

Background information
- Also known as: VCha (2023–2025)
- Origin: Seoul, South Korea; Los Angeles, United States
- Genre: Pop
- Years active: 2023–2024; 2025–present
- Labels: JYP; Republic
- Members: Camila; Kendall; Lexi; Savanna
- Past members: Kaylee; KG
- Website: girlset.com

Girlset (stylized in all caps), formerly known as VCha, is an American girl group based in Los Angeles. The group consists of four members: Camila, Lexi, Kendall, and Savanna. The group was formed in 2023 by JYP Entertainment and Republic Records through the reality competition show A2K. The show culminated with the top six contestants debuting as VCha, and they released an extended play (EP), SeVit (New Light) in September 2023.

Contract disputes resulted in one member, KG, departing in December 2024, and a second, Kaylee, departed in July 2025. The remaining four members rebranded as Girlset in August 2025. Since rebranding, Girlset has released a number of singles, including collaborations with Missy Elliott and Kylie Cantrall.

== Name ==
"VCha", the group's former name, is derived from the Korean word 비춰 (RR: bichwo), which translates to "to shine upon" or "to illuminate". The name references the group's purpose to illuminate and inspire fans around the world. Fans of VCha were known as "Vlights".

"Girlset", the group's current name, was chosen because the girls are "commit[ted] to setting their own, boundless path". The group refers to its current fanbase as "Lockets."

== History ==
=== 2023–2024: A2K, debut and opening for Twice ===
A2K is a 2023 American reality competition show. A2K, short for "America to Korea", was a collaborative project between JYP Entertainment and Republic Records, with the goal of forming the first American girl group using the K-pop system, intended for a global audience. The group's name was announced as "VCha" during the show's final episode on September 22, 2023, alongside the reveal of the six winning contestants. Following A2K’s three-month bootcamp in Los Angeles, VCha completed approximately five months of training at JYPE’s Seoul headquarters in preparation for their debut.

Their pre-debut digital single album, SeVit (New Light), was released on September 22, supported by the lead single "Y.O.Universe". The same day, they performed this song on Music Bank as their first public performance. Their second pre-debut single, "Ready for the World", originally the A2K theme song, was released on December 1, 2023.

The group's official debut single, "Girls of the Year", was released on January 26, 2024, with b-side "XO Call Me". In February and March 2024, the group performed as the opening act for a leg of Twice's Ready to Be World Tour, performing in São Paulo, Mexico City, and Las Vegas for a total of five shows. On March 10, it was announced that Kaylee would be taking a hiatus due to a health condition. The group's second single, "Only One", was released on March 15, with b-side "Favorite Girl." In May, VCha had their first cover story as part of Teen Vogue's Girl Group Week.

=== 2024–2025: KG's lawsuit, member departures and hiatus ===
VCha was originally set to make their first music festival appearance at Lollapalooza on August 2, 2024. However, the festival announced in July that they were no longer performing due to "unforeseen circumstances".

On December 7, 2024, KG announced that she had decided to terminate her contract with JYP Entertainment and leave VCha, citing "incidents of abuse and mistreatment by certain staff members". She filed a lawsuit against JYP USA at the Los Angeles Superior Court on December 6. According to KBS News and Hankyung, she said in her statement that, although she endured high-intensity work and extreme restrictions on her personal life, she received little salary and ended up in debt. She later stated that she did not want to blame anyone but the industry and also attributed her decision to leave to controversial issues in the industry, including a member's suicide attempt and the development of eating disorders. She closed her statement by saying that she hopes her decision to leave will help other trainees who are also struggling and that she would continue to work towards becoming a singer. JYP USA later disputed her claims, citing them as "exaggerated", while also confirming the group's activities have been temporarily suspended as a result of the label's dispute with KG. A second member, Kaylee, left the group and JYP Entertainment on July 12, 2025, through a mutual contract termination. KG's lawsuit was settled on August 8, confirming her departure from JYP Entertainment.

=== 2025–present: Rebrand as Girlset ===
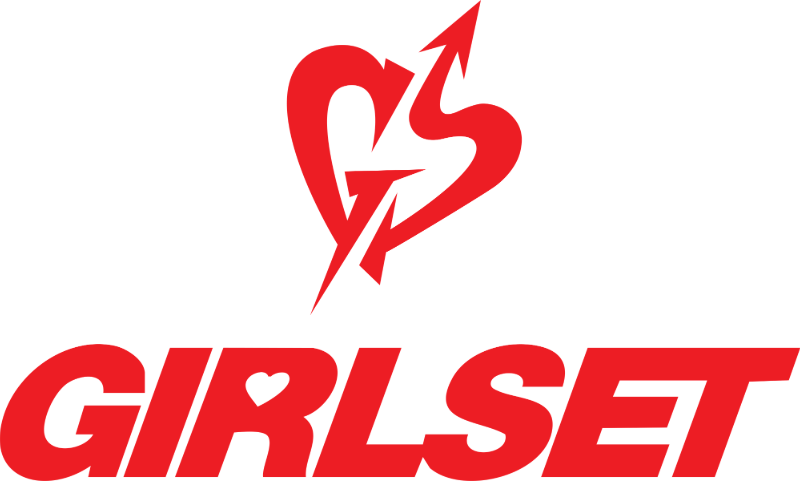
Logo used since rebrand

On August 7, 2025, JYP Entertainment announced that the remaining members of VCha, Camila, Lexi, Kendall and Savanna, would be rebranding under the name Girlset. The group's new official logo was designed by Kendall.

The quartet released their first single, "Commas", on August 29. Girlset released their second single, "Little Miss", on November 14 and performed it on Good Day L.A. on the same day. On January 23, 2026, the group released a remix of the single with American rapper Missy Elliott. On March 6, Girlset released their third single "Tweak", which samples the SWV song "Weak". Shortly after release, the associated music video reached number one on YouTube's worldwide music video trending chart. On July 17, Girlset released their fourth single, "Chat", which also served as a pre-release single for their upcoming debut album.

Following a shift toward greater creative control and a larger role in writing sessions, the group first debuted "Young & Dumb" live on October 17, 2026, at the “82WORLD:LA” festival. On November 12, 2026, Girlset attended The 2026 Streamer Awards as nominees for Best Mainstream Collab alongside Twitch streamer Cinna, performing "Chat" and giving their fans another preview of "Young & Dumb.” They officially released the song on November 13, 2026, alongside a music video directed by Hannah Lux Davis; the song marks their first release where all four members are individually credited as both composers and lyricists. The release followed a collaboration single titled "Glown Up" with Kylie Cantrall, and opening performances on select dates of Cantrall's "The Valley Girl Problem Tour.”

== Members ==
=== Current ===
- Camila
- Kendall
- Lexi – leader
- Savanna

=== Former ===
- Kaylee (2023–2025)
- KG (2023–2024)

== Discography ==
=== Extended plays ===
List of extended plays, with selected details
Title	Details
SeVit (New Light)	Released: September 22, 2023; Label: JYP, Republic; Formats: Digital download, streaming; Track listing: 1. "Y.O.Universe"; 2. "Go Getter"; 3. "Know Me Like That"

=== Singles ===
List of singles, with selected chart positions, showing year released and album name
Title	Year	Peak chart positions			Album
Title	Year	US Dig.	KOR DL	NZ Hot	Album
VCha
"Y.O.Universe"	2023	—	177	—	SeVit (New Light)
"Ready for the World"	2023	—	—	—	Non-album singles
"Girls of the Year"	2024	—	134	—	Non-album singles
"Only One"	2024	—	198	—	Non-album singles
Girlset
"Commas"	2025	—	—	—	Non-album singles
"Little Miss"	2025	—	—	19	Non-album singles
"Tweak"	2026	22	—	9	Non-album singles
"Chat"	2026	—	—	—	TBA
"Glown Up" (with Kylie Cantrall)	2026	—	—	—	Non-album single
"Young & Dumb"	2026	—N/a	—N/a	—N/a	TBA
"—" denotes releases that did not chart or were not released in that region.

== Videography ==
=== Music videos ===
List of music videos, showing year released and directors
Title	Year	Director(s)	Ref.
VCha
"Y.O.Universe"	2023	Naive Creative Production	
"Girls of the Year"	2024	Shin Hee-won	
Girlset
"Commas"	2025	Mia Barnes	
"Little Miss"	2025	Hannah Lux Davis	
"Tweak"	2026	Hannah Lux Davis	
"Chat"	2026	Colin Tilley	
"Young & Dumb"	2026	Hannah Lux Davis	

=== Other videos ===
List of other videos, showing year released and directors
Title	Year	Director(s)	Notes	Ref.
"Ready for the World"	2023	Naive Creative Production	Performance video	
"Only One"	2024	Lee Hyesu, Hong Jaehwan	Performance video	
"Glown Up" (with Cantrall)	2026	—N/a	Performance Visualizer	

== Performances ==
=== Televised Shows ===
Date	Event	City	Country	Performed song(s)	Ref.
September 22, 2023	Music Bank	Seoul	South Korea	"Y.O.Universe"	
September 23, 2023	Show! Music Core	Goyang	South Korea	"Y.O.Universe"	
January 2024	Good Day New York	New York City	United States	“Girls of The Year”	
February 16, 2024	MTV Fresh Out Live	New York City	United States	“Girls of The Year”	
November 14, 2025	Good Day L.A.	West Hollywood	United States	"Little Miss"	
July 17, 2026	Music Bank	Seoul	South Korea	"Chat"	
July 18, 2026	Show! Music Core	Goyang	South Korea	"Chat"	
July 19, 2026	Inkigayo	Seoul	South Korea	"Chat"	

=== Award Shows ===
Date	Event	City	Country	Venue	Performed song(s)	Ref.
November 12, 2026	2026 Streamer Awards	Los Angeles	United States	Avalon Hollywood	“CHAT” and “Young & Dumb”	

== Accolades ==
=== Awards and nominations ===
Awards	Year	Category	Nominated Work	Result	Ref.
The Streamer Awards	2026	Best Mainstream Collab	Girlset X Cinna	Nominated	

=== Listicles ===
Name of publisher, year listed, name of listicle, and placement
Publisher	Year	Listicle	Placement	Ref.
Teen Vogue	2024	12 Girl Groups to Watch in 2024	Placed	
Billboard	2026	21 Under 21	Placed	
