= Antonio Valdés y Fernández Bazán =

Spanish Navy officer (1744–1816)

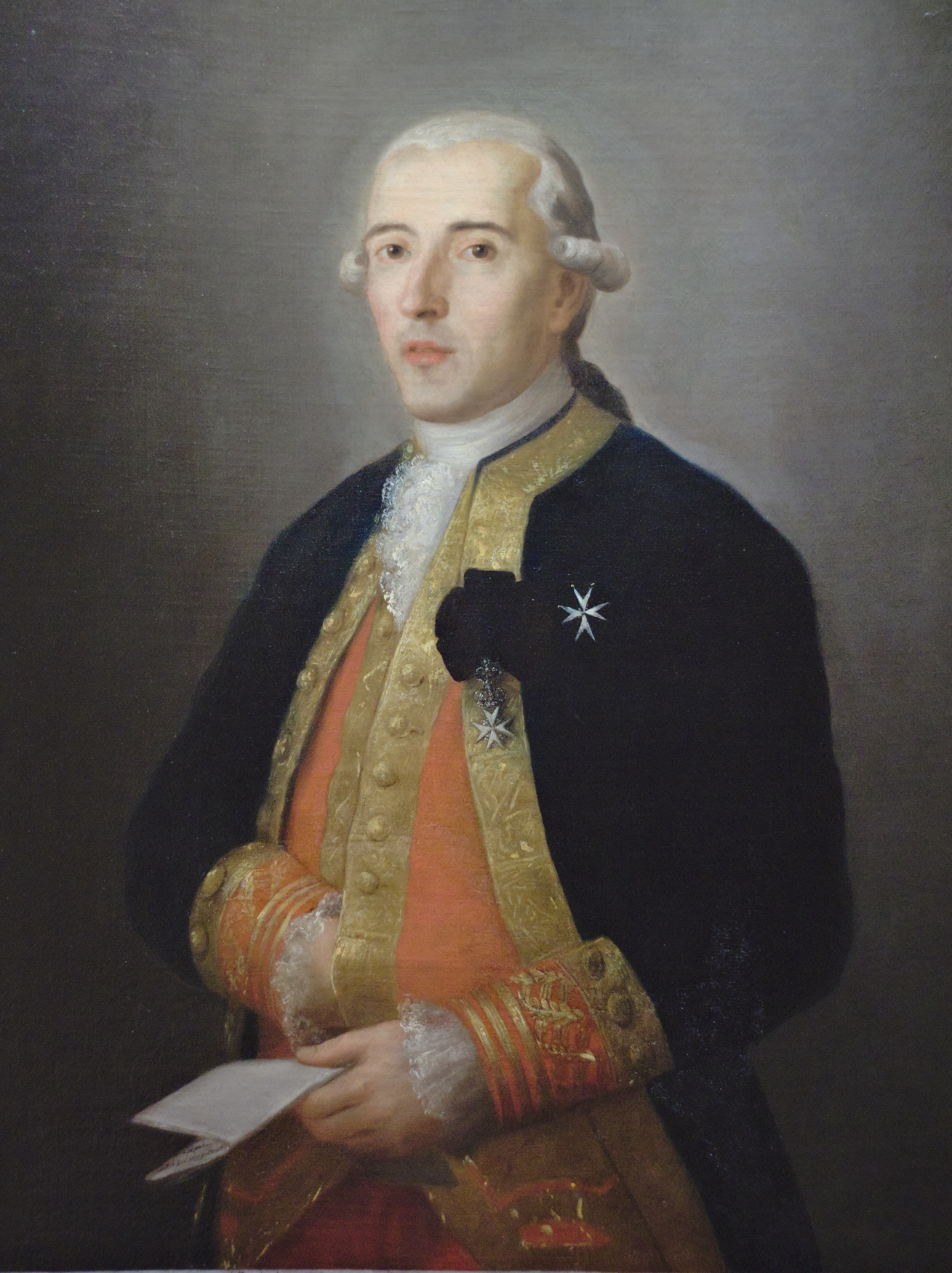
- Born: 25 March 1744; Burgos, Spain
- Died: 4 April 1816 (aged 72); Madrid, Spain
- Military career
- Allegiance: Spain
- Branch: Spanish Navy
- Conflicts: Siege of Havana

Secretary of State for Navy of Spain
- In office 9 March 1783 – 13 November 1795
- Monarchs: Charles III; Charles IV
- First Secretary of State: Count of Floridablanca; Count of Aranda; Manuel Godoy
- Preceded by: Pedro González de Castejón
- Succeeded by: Position abolished

Secretary of State for War, Treasury, Commerce and Navigation of Indies of Spain
- In office 8 July 1787 – 25 April 1790
- Monarchs: Charles III; Charles IV
- First Secretary of State: Count of Floridablanca
- Preceded by: Position created
- Succeeded by: Position abolished

Antonio Valdés y Fernández Bazán (25 March 1744 – 4 April 1816) was a Spanish Navy officer.

== Biography ==
He entered the navy at the age of 13. He distinguished himself in the defence of Morro Castle and San Salvador de la Punta Fortress during the siege of Havana. Defeated by the British, he was captured and sent to Cádiz. He also fought against the Barbary Coast pirates in 1767.

In 1781, he became director of the Royal Artillery Factory of La Cavada, and reorganised it to that extent that he was promoted to become inspector general of the Spanish Navy. In 1783, at the age of 38, he became Navy Minister and continued the modernisation of the Spanish Navy.

In 1785, among 12 flags that he drew, one was chosen to become the Spanish naval ensign flag by Charles III.

He became a knight in the Order of the Golden Fleece in 1797.

The U.S. settlements of Valdez, Alaska, and Valdez, Florida, were named after him, as well as Bazan Bay in Victoria, British Columbia, Canada. The oil tanker Exxon Valdez, which gained notoriety after running aground in Prince William Sound spilling its cargo of crude oil into the sea on 24 March 1989, was named after the Alaskan town that had been named after Valdés.
