= Valdez Blockade =

The Valdez Blockade was a 1993 protest by Cordova fishermen who blockaded the Valdez Narrows in an attempt to obtain funding for research and restoration efforts relating to decreasing yields of pink salmon and herring in Prince William Sound following the Exxon Valdez Oil Spill. The fishermen were dissatisfied with the Exxon Valdez Oil Spill Trustee's Council's refusal to fund research efforts into the spill's effects on the fish. The blockade lasted three days, from August 20 to August 22. The blockade ended when Secretary of the Interior, Bruce Babbitt, promised funding for salmon and herring research. Findings from these studies resulted in additional compensation from Exxon.

== Background ==
The initial 1991 settlement would require Exxon to pay $1 billion in damages. $900 million was allocated to a trust fund concerning special environmental restoration and the other $100 million went directly to the state and federal governments. By 1993, the United States General Accounting Office released a report stating that of the $200 million spent at that point in time, most had gone to federal and state programs and little had been awarded through competitive bids. The majority of the settlement that had been paid by Exxon had been allocated towards recovering legal fees, administrative costs, and reimbursements to the state and Federal governments as well as cleanup companies in order to cover the costs of cleanup work.

Following the events of the Exxon oil spill, in 1991 a council dedicated to environmental restoration procession was established to guide future environmental disaster. The Exxon Valdez Oil Spill Trustee's Council have a mission statement that explicates their goal to maintain and improve the fish, game, and aquatic plant resources in the state of Alaska.

== Reasoning for the Blockade ==
Four years after the Exxon Valdez Oil Spill, Alaska fishermen had been experiencing a significant decrease in the amount of fish they had been bringing in. Fishermen cited the 11 million gallons of crude oil in the Prince William Sound's waters as a result of the spill as the reason for the declining level of pink salmon cultivation. The affected reef was the Bligh Reef, located in the Prince William Sound. The high population density places the adult herring in a situation where even a small oil spill could affect most of the spawning stock. There had been damage to Bligh Reef in the past through the Alaska Steamship Company's Olympia that collided with the reef in 1910. The Trustee Council had taken no action to fund research efforts to support these claims to the frustration of the fishermen who relied on the pink salmon. The fishermen decided that they would need to take action to garner support for their goal.

== The Blockade ==
The fishermen's plan was to build a blockade that would cut-off the primary trade route of Exxon ships and other commercial tankers. The location of the protest, the Prince William Sound, is a small body of water that has channels that engage with other rivers and streams to eventually connect with the Pacific Ocean. From August 20—22 [1993], sixty to one-hundred fishing boats blocked off the Valdez Narrows. The fishermen stated that the blockade would remain until Interior Secretary Bruce Babbitt agreed to provide assistance in the research and recovery efforts for damage to the Prince William Sound's Bligh Reef and local ecosystem. The blockade resulted in the prevention of oil tankers from reaching the Trans-Alaska Pipeline terminal.

The protesters of the blockade were aware of the high stakes of their actions facing potential fines of up to $25,000 for violating a safe passage mandate for tankers heading towards the trans-Alaskan pipeline terminal. Banners displayed by protesters contained messages with direct contribution to pollution stating, “No More Lies, Exxon”. These messages aimed to strongly reject Exxon's absence of action in the midst of high levels of pollution.

There were many protestors who publicly shared their beliefs on the issue of pollution in the Prince William Sound. Rick Steiner, a college teacher & fisherman, shared his perspective on the protest stating “this is great news” joining the protest. Steiner was glad that an administration would make a commitment to a legal action of environmental restoration.

Following a two-week tour of Alaska, Bruce Babbitt would meet with the protestors on August 23. Babbitt promised to urge Federal and state trustees in charge of a near billion-dollar settlement from Exxon to support environmental protection efforts in aid of local hatcheries and allocate a portion of the settlement in order to purchase land to protect salmon-spawning streams in Prince William Sound.

Of the tankers, British Petroleum and Arco made the effort to meet with Mr. Babbitt, protesters, and Governor Walter J. Hickel. The Governor was present for multiple land-purchases and preservations that assisted the habitat protection program. Of the tankers, Exxon did not meet with Mr. Babbitt. In response he claimed that given the circumstance it was outrageous that Exxon would not meet. Secretary Babbitt also promised to bring the full weight of the government to bring Exxon into negotiations.

The fines accumulated from the US Coast Guard were forgiven following a meeting with Jim Gray, a spokesman for the protestors, and President Clinton's staff in Washington D.C.

== Effects of the Blockade ==
The blockade is considered to be a contributing factor to federal studies in Prince William Sound. The studies found that lingering oil from the spill had a negative impact on wildlife in the area, impacting the populations of seabirds, sea otters, seals, eagles, killer whales, salmon, and herring. These studies gave cause to demand an additional $92 million from Exxon for the purposes of restoring the shorelines that had been impacted by the oil spill.

After the blockade, the Exxon Valdez Oil Spill Trustee Council created the Sound Ecosystem Assessment Program. The SEA Program was created to determine the factors that impact the proliferation of Pacific herring and pink salmon which the fishermen of Cordova relied upon. The SEA project is the largest ecosystem research project funded by the Trustee Council. The Trustee Council stated that the SEA Program's creation was directly linked to the blockade.

The SEA program's development is inclusive of models that orchestrate the patterns of salmon migration, and plankton movement patterns. The SEA program's models help to predict the returns for pink salmon during season. The forecasting of the hatchery models builds adjustments for when the release of salmon fry and herring fry will be conducted.

== See also ==
- Exxon Valdez Oil Spill
- Cordova
- Prince William Sound
- Bligh Reef
- blockade
- pink salmon
- ExxonMobil
