= JYP Entertainment =

South Korean entertainment conglomerate company

JYP Entertainment Corporation
- Logo used since January 2021

- Headquarters in the Gangdong District
- Native name: JYP 엔터테인먼트
- Formerly: Tae-Hong Planning Corporation (1997–2001)
- Type: Public
- Traded as: KRX: 035900
- Industry: Music; entertainment
- Founded: April 25, 1997; 29 years ago
- Founder: J.Y. Park; Bang Si-hyuk
- Headquarters: 205 Gangdong-daero, Gangdong District, Seoul (Seongnae-dong, JYP Center), South Korea
- Area served: Worldwide, primarily in Asia and North America
- Key people: Jeong Wook (CEO); Byun Sang-bong (CFO); Park Jin-young (CCO)
- Services: Artist management; Concert production company; Event management; Music production; Music publishing company
- Revenue: ▲ ₩821.9 billion (US$613.23 million) (2025)
- Net income: ▲ ₩160.6 billion (US$119.83 million) (2025)
- Total assets: ▲ ₩851.09 billion (US$635.01 million) (2025)
- Total equity: ▲ ₩624.95 billion (US$466.28 million) (2025)
- Owner: J.Y. Park (15.37%); JYP Entertainment Corporation (6.75%); Miri Capital Management (6.31%); Others (77.52%)
- Number of employees: 496 (2025)
- Subsidiaries: See subsidiaries
- Website: jype.com

JYP Entertainment Corporation (Korean: JYP 엔터테인먼트) is a South Korean multinational entertainment and record label conglomerate founded in 1997 by J.Y. Park and Bang Si-hyuk. Operating as a record label, talent agency, music production company, event management company, concert production company and music publishing house, it is one of the largest entertainment companies in South Korea. The company also operates subsidiary ventures and divisions internationally.

== History ==
=== 1997–99: Formation and first generation K-pop artists ===
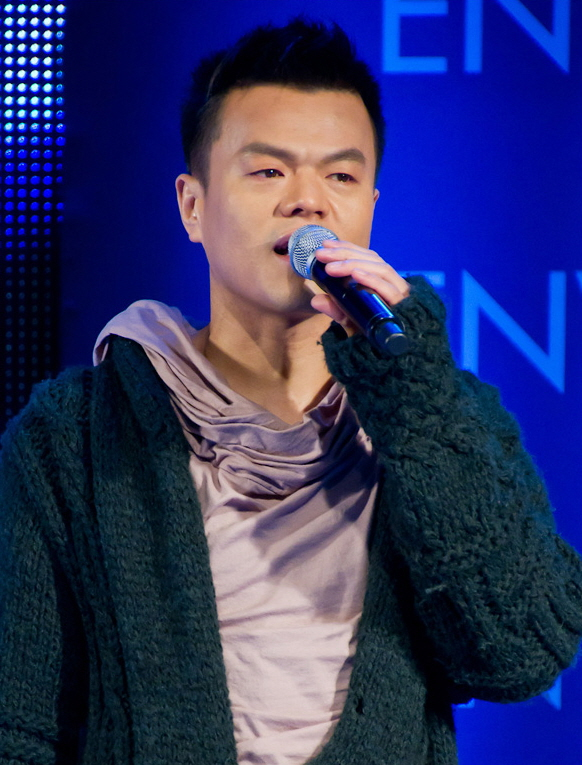
J.Y. Park, co-founder of JYP Entertainment.

JYP Entertainment was founded in 1997 by South Korean singer-songwriter J.Y. Park and record producer Bang Si-hyuk as Tae-Hong Planning Corporation. In 2001, the company was retitled as JYP Entertainment, named after Park's stage name. In 1997, the company signed its first artist – Pearl.

In 1999, entertainment company SidusHQ introduced the future members of boy band g.o.d to Park, as their producer and mentor. In cooperation with SidusHQ, the company oversaw the formation of g.o.d, which would make their debut appearance on January 13, 1999. The group was managed by SidusHQ, with their first album, Chapter 1, being produced by Park.

=== 2000–09: Early success and second generation K-pop artists ===
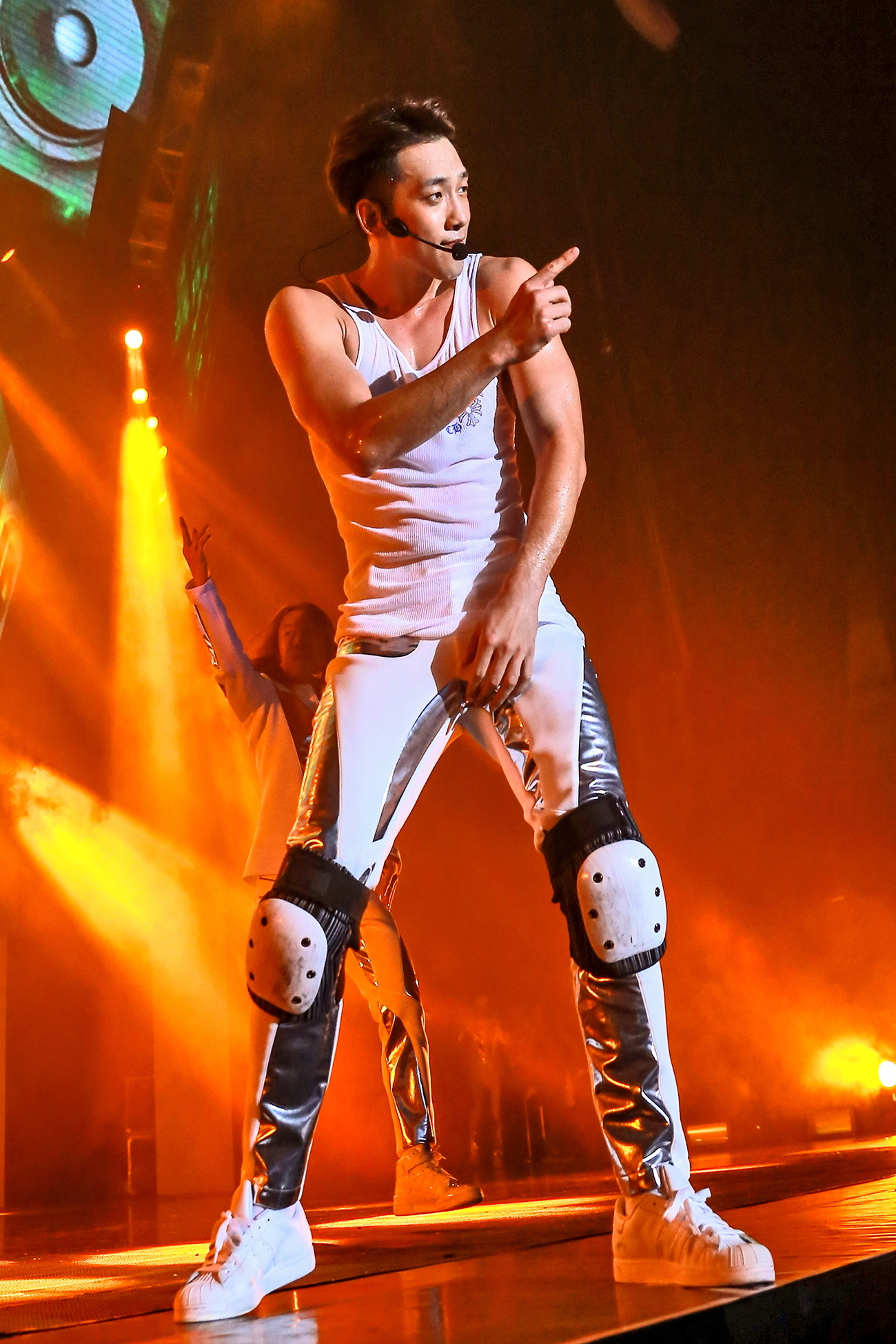
Rain, who was named one of Time's 100 most influential people in the world in 2006 and 2011.

In December 2000, JYP Entertainment signed Rain as a trainee, who made his debut two years later in May 2002. Rain would then rise to become a commercial success throughout and beyond Asia, which was seen when his third studio album, It's Raining, went on to record cumulative sales of over one million copies in seven Asian countries, including South Korea.

On December 27, 2002, the company's first boy group was a four-member vocal oriented group, Noel, which failed to attract popularity. The company then turned its focus towards the duo brothers One Two in 2003. In 2004, after the boy band g.o.d's group contract with SidusHQ ended, they signed a contract with JYP Entertainment. Other artists that debuted under JYP Entertainment from 2000 to 2005 were Park Ji-yoon, Byul, Lim Jeong-hee, and Ryanga Rhanga.

In May 2006, the company formed its first girl group, Wonder Girls, who became a commercial success and was the first South Korean group to enter the Billboard Hot 100 in 2009, with their song "Nobody". Their success lead to a management deal with the Jonas Group, which led the group to open the Jonas Brothers' world tour in select cities. In 2007, Rain left JYP Entertainment and established his own agency called J. Tune Entertainment.

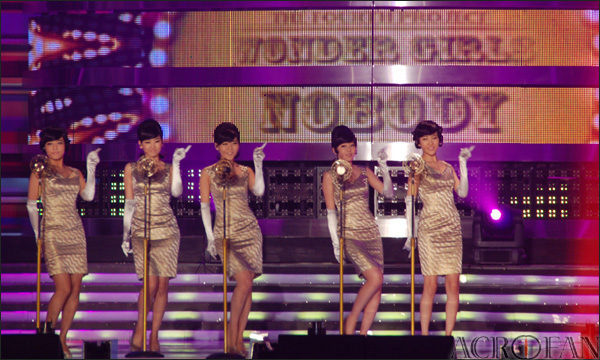
Wonder Girls in 2008. The first South Korean group to chart the Billboard Hot 100.

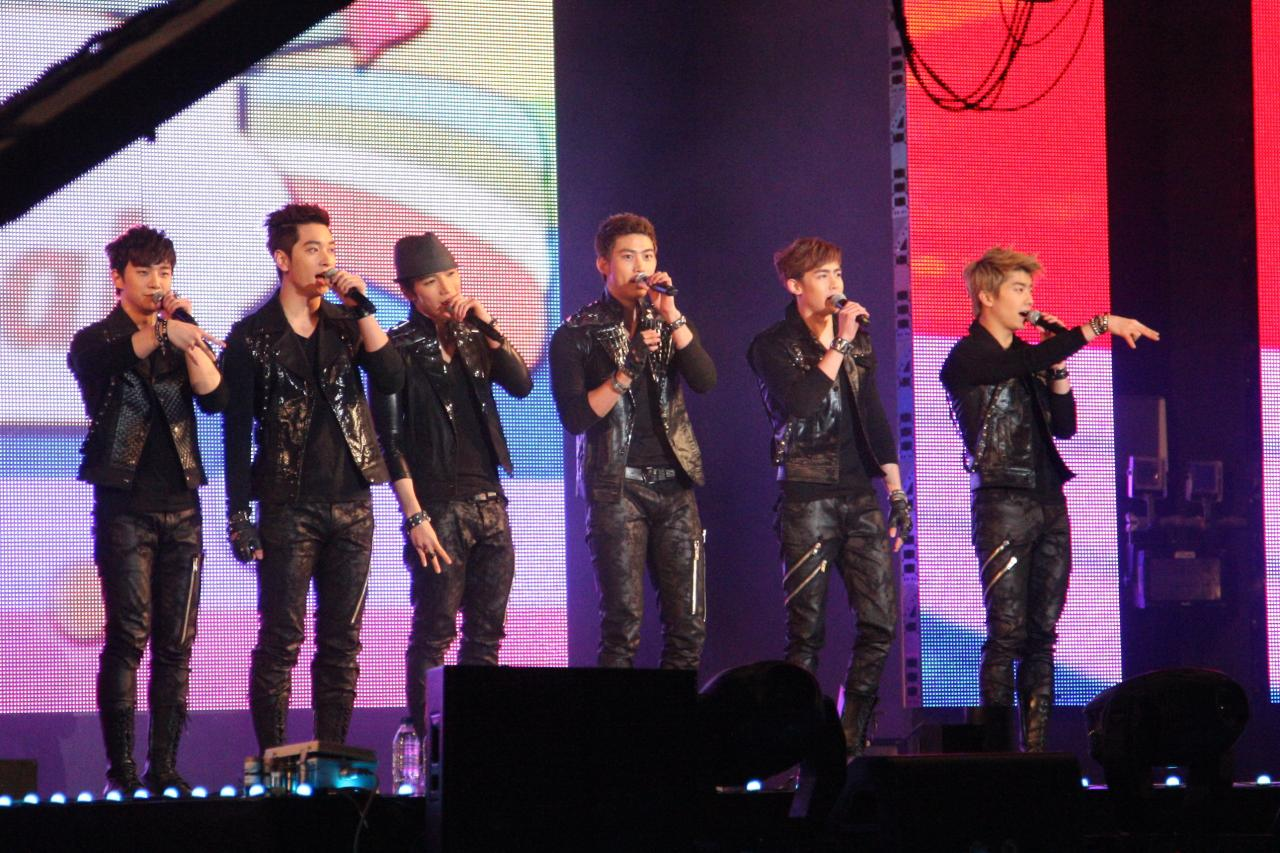
2PM in 2011. JYP Entertainment's first and only act to win the MAMA Award for Artist of the Year.

In 2008, the competitive reality series Hot Blood Men aired, pitting male trainees against each other for the chance to debut. The winning group, One Day, was later split into two boy bands, 2PM and 2AM, both of whom debuted later that year. 2AM was jointly contracted with Big Hit Entertainment. Later in October, the JYP Beijing Center was opened, as the company's China branch. In that same year, the Creative Artists Agency included JYP Entertainment in its roster of high-profile clientele.

Expanding its endeavors into the drama production industry following in the footsteps of SM Entertainment Group's SM C&C and CJ E&M's Studio Dragon – JYP Entertainment jointly established the television drama production company Holym with Key East Entertainment in June 2009. Holym later announced its first major television drama production, Dream High, in 2010, starring artists from JYP Entertainment.

=== 2010–17: Joint ventures and third generation K-pop artists ===
In March 2010, JYP Entertainment made a joint venture with SM Entertainment, YG Entertainment, Star Empire Entertainment, Media Line, CAN Entertainment and Music Factory Entertainment to establish KMP Holdings, the official distributor of releases from these companies. On December 28, 2010, JYP Entertainment became the largest shareholder of J. Tune Entertainment. The subsidiary AQ Entertainment was later formed and introduced the Chinese-Korean girl group Miss A.

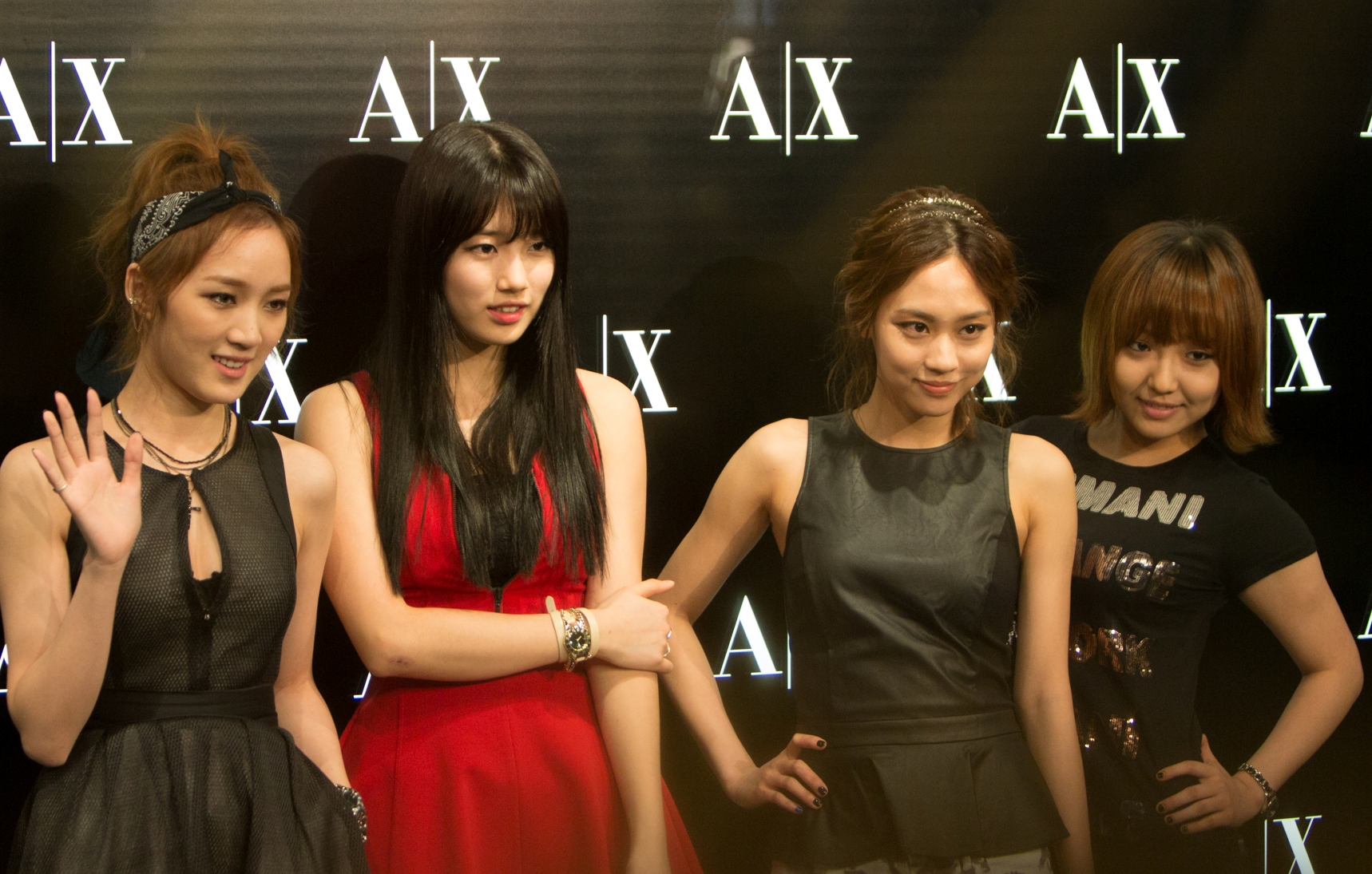
Miss A, the first act to have their debut song reach atop the Gaon Digital Chart.

In November 2011, the American based subsidiary JYP Creative was established. Park invested approximately US$1.2 million in the branch. After a year of operation, the company saw a net loss of around US$1.5 million by the end of 2012, leading to the liquidation and closure of the branch, including the New York branch. The same year, Park Jimin, winner of the competitive TV series K-pop Star and Baek Yerin, a female trainee and contestant on the show Star King, debuted as the duo 15&.

In 2012, JYP Pictures signed a contract with China Eastern Performing Arts Group to co-produce a movie Hold Your Hand, featuring actors who were signed to JYP Entertainment.

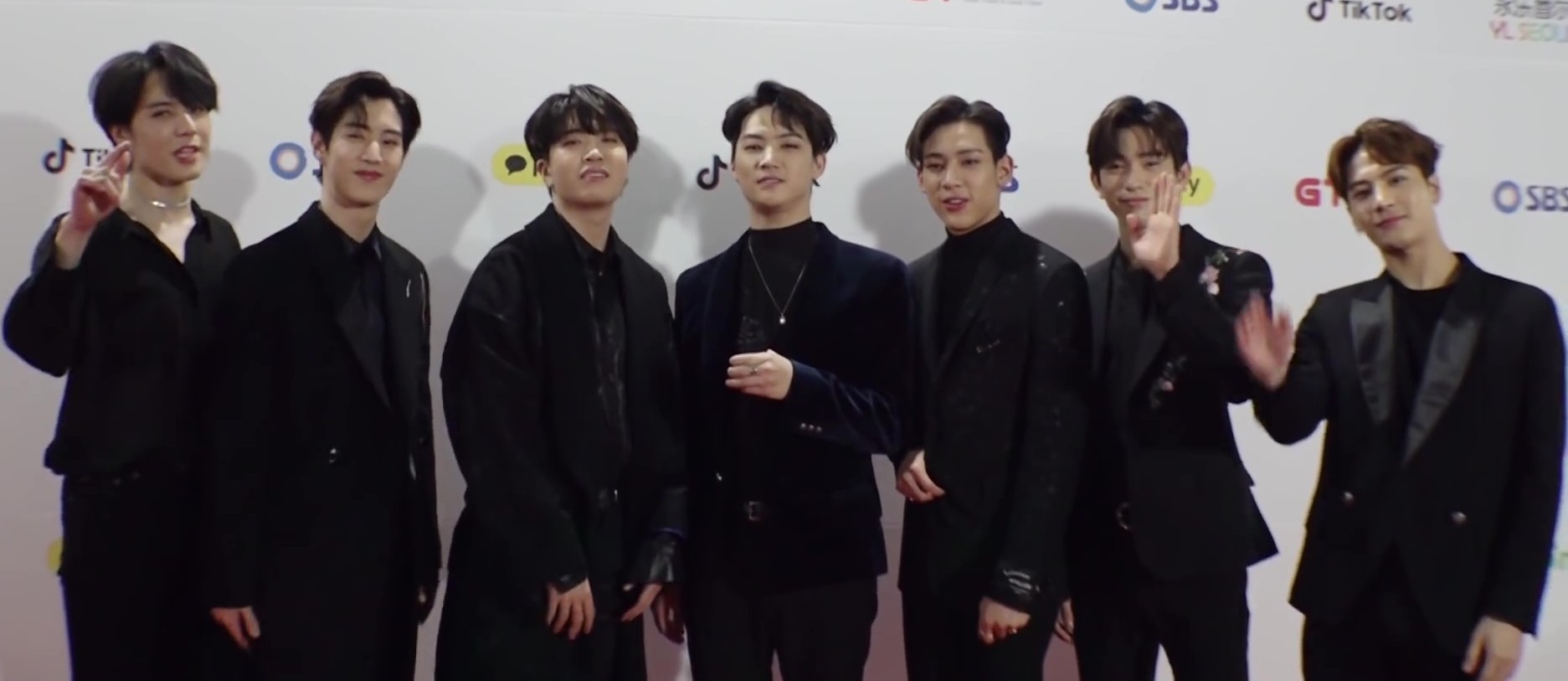
Got7 in 2019.

On June 20, 2013, the merger plan for the publicly listed JYP Entertainment and the non-listed JYP was announced. The merger was approved on October 17. Miss A and Baek A-yeon, also joined JYP Entertainment due to the merger. On August 25, 2013, JYP Entertainment and KeyEast terminated their joint production enterprise, Holym. On November 17, 2013, the company partnered with Smilegate to promote the video game Crossfire with 2PM and Miss A.

In January 2014, the seven talent agencies behind KMP Holdings formed a collective bond partnership and bought 13.48% of KT Music's stocks, leaving KT Corporation with 49.99%. In the same month, Got7, made their debut. 2AM's joint contract of Big Hit Entertainment with JYP Entertainment later in April ended, after three of the 2AM members returned to JYP Entertainment, and member Lee Chang-min stayed with Big Hit Entertainment, to continue his career and as part of the duo Homme. In August, JYP Pictures and Dongyang World Culture Communication produced the drama Dream Knight, starring Got7 members. Season three K-pop Star winner Bernard Park signed a contract with JYP Entertainment to start his solo career, and making his debut on October 6. On December 17, J.Y. Park sold the company's headquarters building in Cheongdam-dong, Seoul to Choi Ki-won, for approximately $7 million, on the term that JYP Entertainment will still use the building for three years on rent.

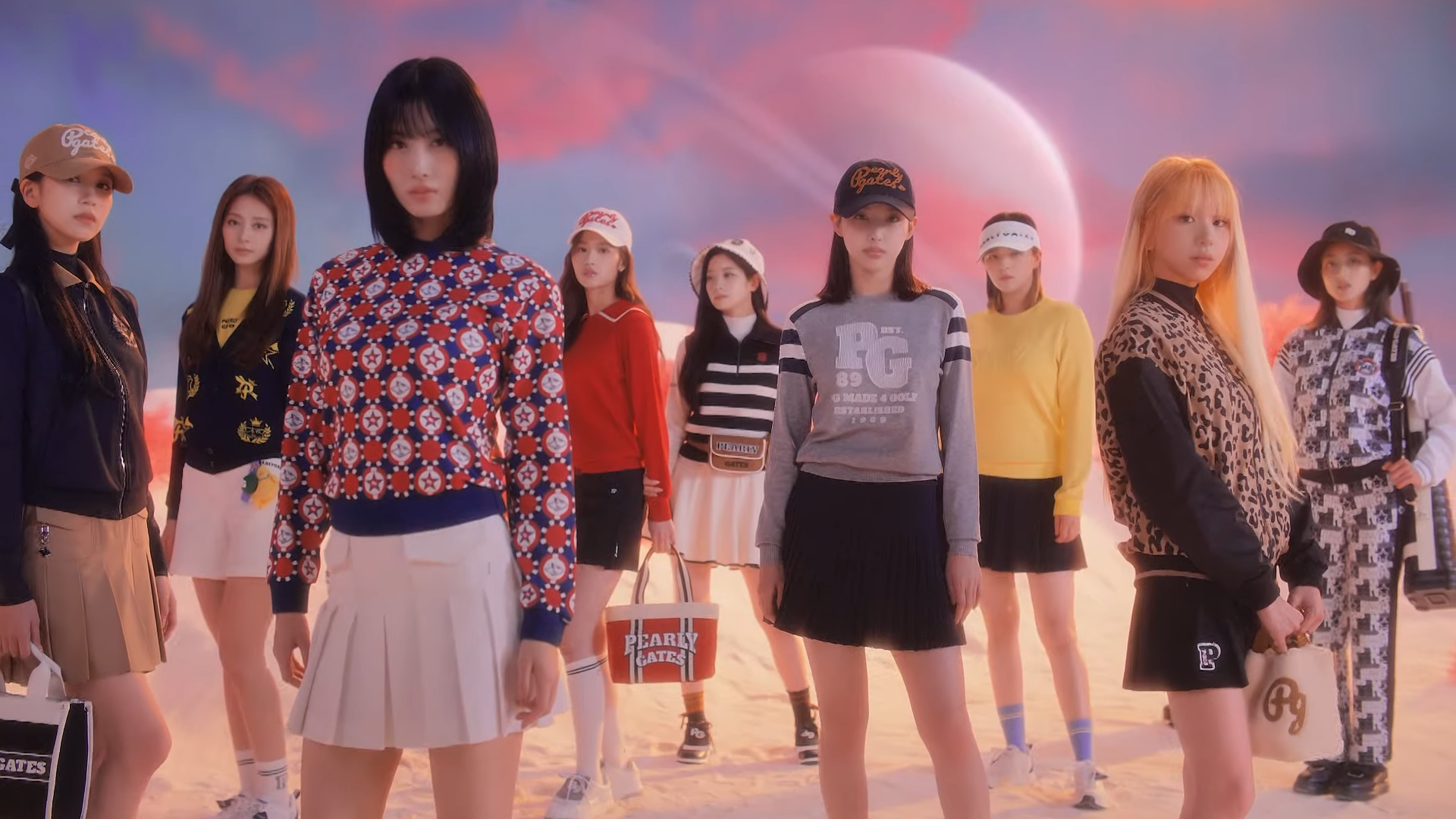
The success of Twice led JYP Entertainment to become the largest South Korean entertainment company.

The subsidiary Studio J was formed on January 9, 2015, in line with JYP Entertainment's goal to "promote free and deep artists that create authentic music rather than appealing to the mainstream demand." The first artist on Studio J's roster was G.Soul, who debuted on the same day. In March, 2AM members Seulong and Jin-woon departed from the company following their contracts' expiration, while Jo Kwon renewed his contract. The company stated 2AM remained intact and would be promoting as a group. On April 15, the company signed a contract with Jax Coco, a Hong Kong-based coconut product company. Both companies planned to launch coconut oil, coconut flakes, and other related products at major department stores and supermarkets in South Korea. In September, rock band Day6 debuted. In October, the girl group Twice debuted. The members of the group were chosen from the competitive reality show Sixteen.

In February 2016, JYP Entertainment established a music distribution partnership with China Music Corporation. It was followed by JYP Entertainment jointly establishing Beijing Xin Sheng Entertainment Co. Ltd. with Tencent Music in the same year, which oversaw the debut of the Chinese boy band Boy Story.

In July 2017, JYP Entertainment acquired a property worth 20.2 billion KRW in Seongnae-dong, Gangdong District, Seoul to be used as its new office. A partnership with Dailymotion, Europe's largest video platform, was signed to open its artist channel on its platform to secure a more global fan base.

=== 2018–23: Further success and fourth generation K-pop artists ===
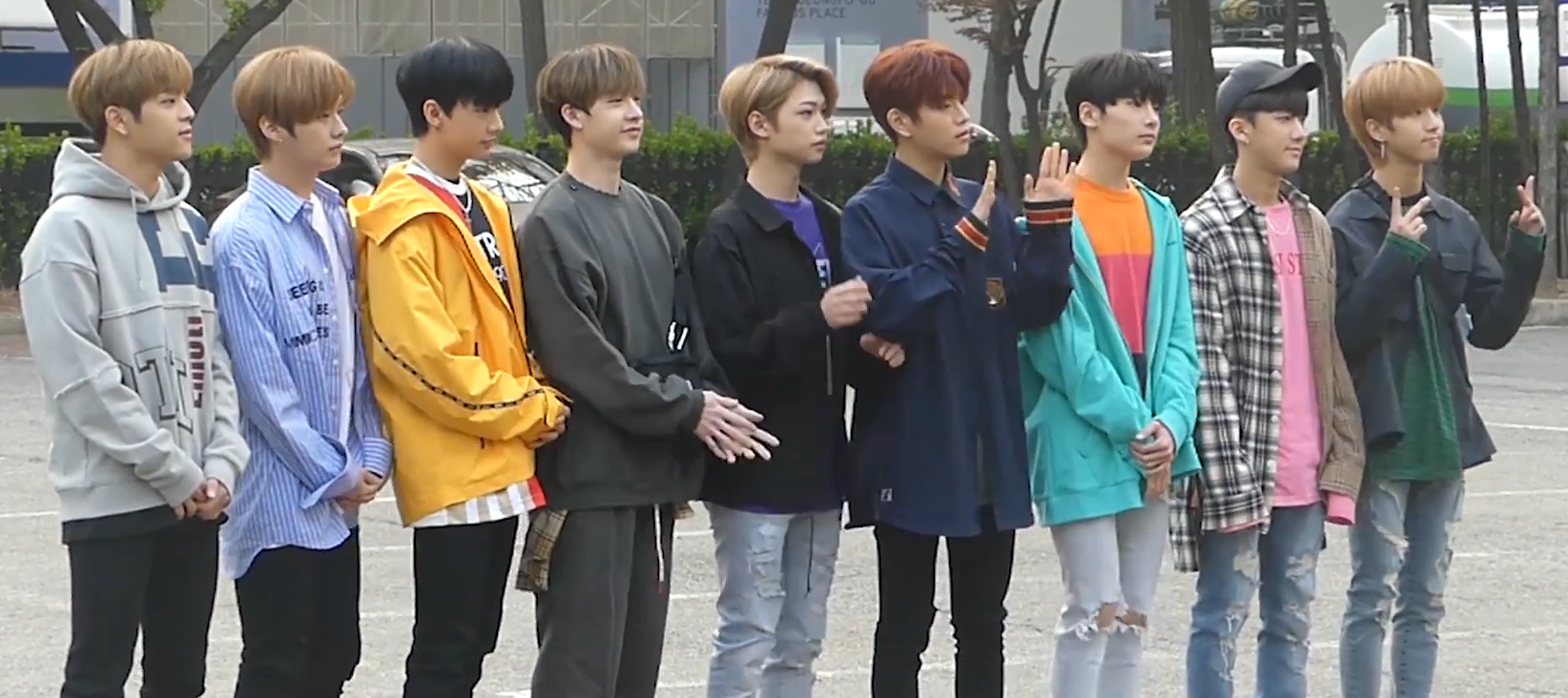
Stray Kids in 2018.

On January 31, 2018, JYP Entertainment entered into a music business agreement with SM Entertainment, Big Hit Entertainment, and SK Telecom to launch a new music platform Flo, which will utilize various new technologies such as artificial intelligence and 5G networking. SK Telecom affiliate Iriver Inc would be responsible for handling the music distribution. In the first half of 2018, JYP Entertainment became the second largest entertainment company in South Korea, mainly due to the success of Twice and Got7. On March 26, a new boy group Stray Kids debuted, named after the 2017 reality show of the same title. In May, the company became the sole South Korean entertainment company to rank in Financial Times magazine's "FT 1000: High-Growth Companies Asia-Pacific" list. On August 30, the company's shares closed at 31,300 KRW, pushing the company's market capitalization to 1.09 trillion KRW.

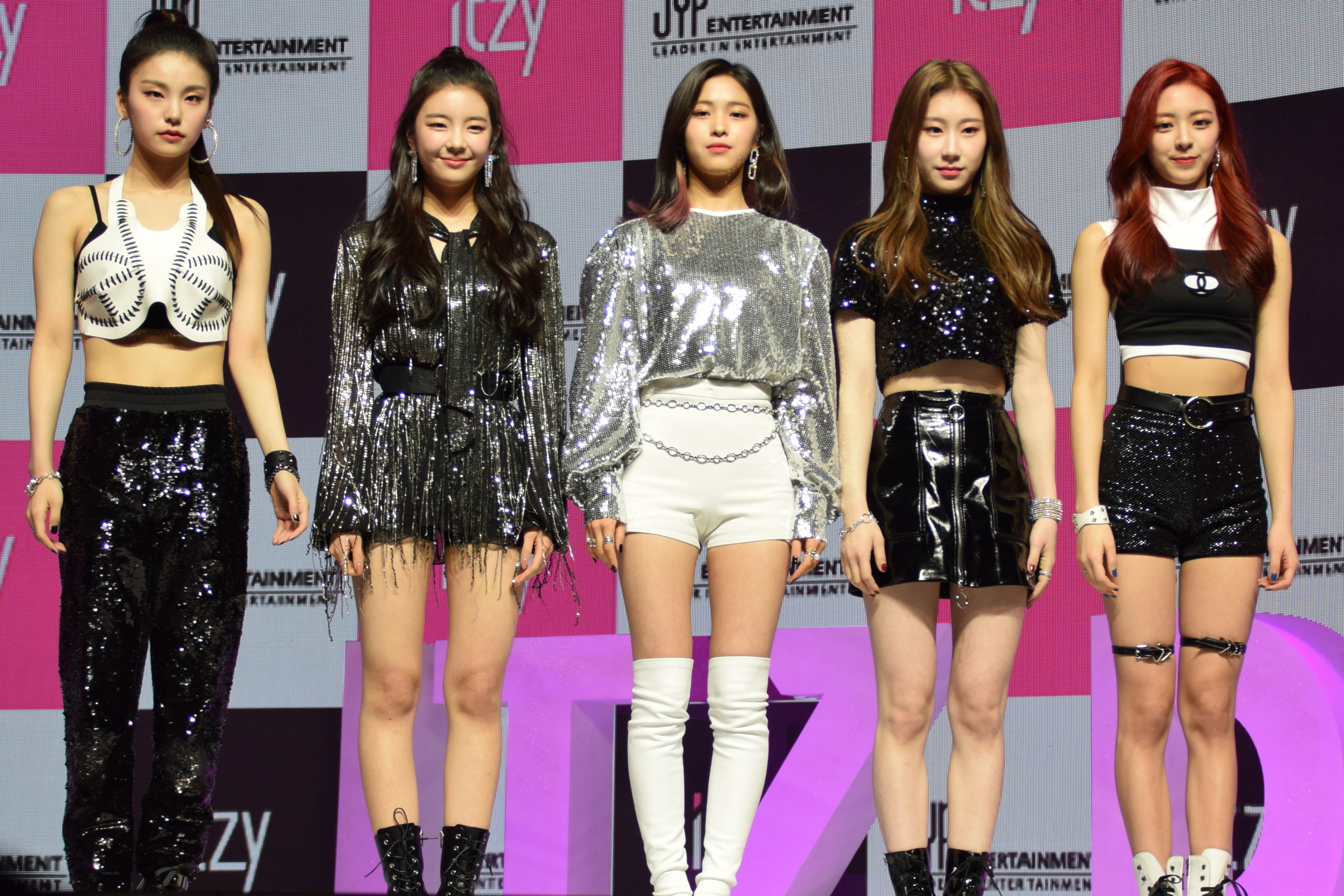
Itzy in their 2019 debut showcase.

On January 21, 2019, JYP Entertainment announced its next girl group, Itzy. The group released their debut single album, It'z Different in February, featuring the single "Dalla Dalla". On January 24, the program Super Intern premiered on Mnet, which featured the internship process at JYP Entertainment, with the goal of turning the interns into permanent marketing management staff. On January 29, plans of creating a Japanese girl group, under their vision "JYP 2.0: Globalization By Localization" was announced. On the season finale of Nizi Project, the line-up for the new girl group, NiziU, was revealed. The group is a partnership with Sony Music Entertainment Japan, who manages its activities in Japan. The group made their debut on December 2, 2020. On March 11, 2019, JYP Entertainment made a partnership with Sony Music Entertainment's The Orchard. JYP Entertainment would distribute both digital and physical releases to key markets in the internationally through The Orchard in order to "expand the label's presence around the world." On June 8, Fanling Culture Media trainee Yao Chen placed 5th in the finale of Produce Camp 2019 has made the final lineup of project group R1SE. The group made their debut on the same day. On June 17, JYP and Make-A-Wish Korea signed a memorandum of understanding to help support children's wishes under JYP Entertainment's "Every Dream Matters!" campaign as part of their corporate social responsibility. Under the agreement, the company would be carrying out various social responsibility activities with its artists, employees and fans in order to support campaigns and initiatives for children with incurable diseases. On July 24, JYP Entertainment announced the closure of their acting division and would jointly manage its actors with the new start-up company, Npio Entertainment, created by JYP Entertainment Vice President Pyo Jong-rok. Actors Jang Hee-ryung, Park Si-eun and Ryu Won left the company. Actors Yoon Park, Kang Hoon, Shin Ye-eun, Kim Dong-hee and Lee Chan-sun stayed in the company for the remainder of their contract periods.

On January 6, 2020, Shinhan Card collaborated with JYP Entertainment to release four "JYP Fan's EDM Check Cards" – JYP, Got7, Day6 and Twice. Certain percentages of the amount used when making payments using the check cards were to be donated to Make-A-Wish Korea. On February 24, Twice was signed under Republic Records for American promotions. On August 4, a collaboration with SM Entertainment to establish Beyond Live Corporation, a joint company for virtual concerts was announced. On November 17, JYP Entertainment invested 5 billion KRW in Naver Z, the developer of the online avatar app Zepeto.

On January 10, 2021, all members of Got7 left JYP Entertainment upon the completion of their 7-year contract. On April 26, JYP Entertainment and P Nation announced to form their new boy group in Loud. It premiered on June 5 on SBS. On July 12, the second season of Nizi Project was announced as a Global Boys Audition. On November 1, JYP Entertainment announced its new rock band Xdinary Heroes. The band released their debut single "Happy Death Day" on December 6.

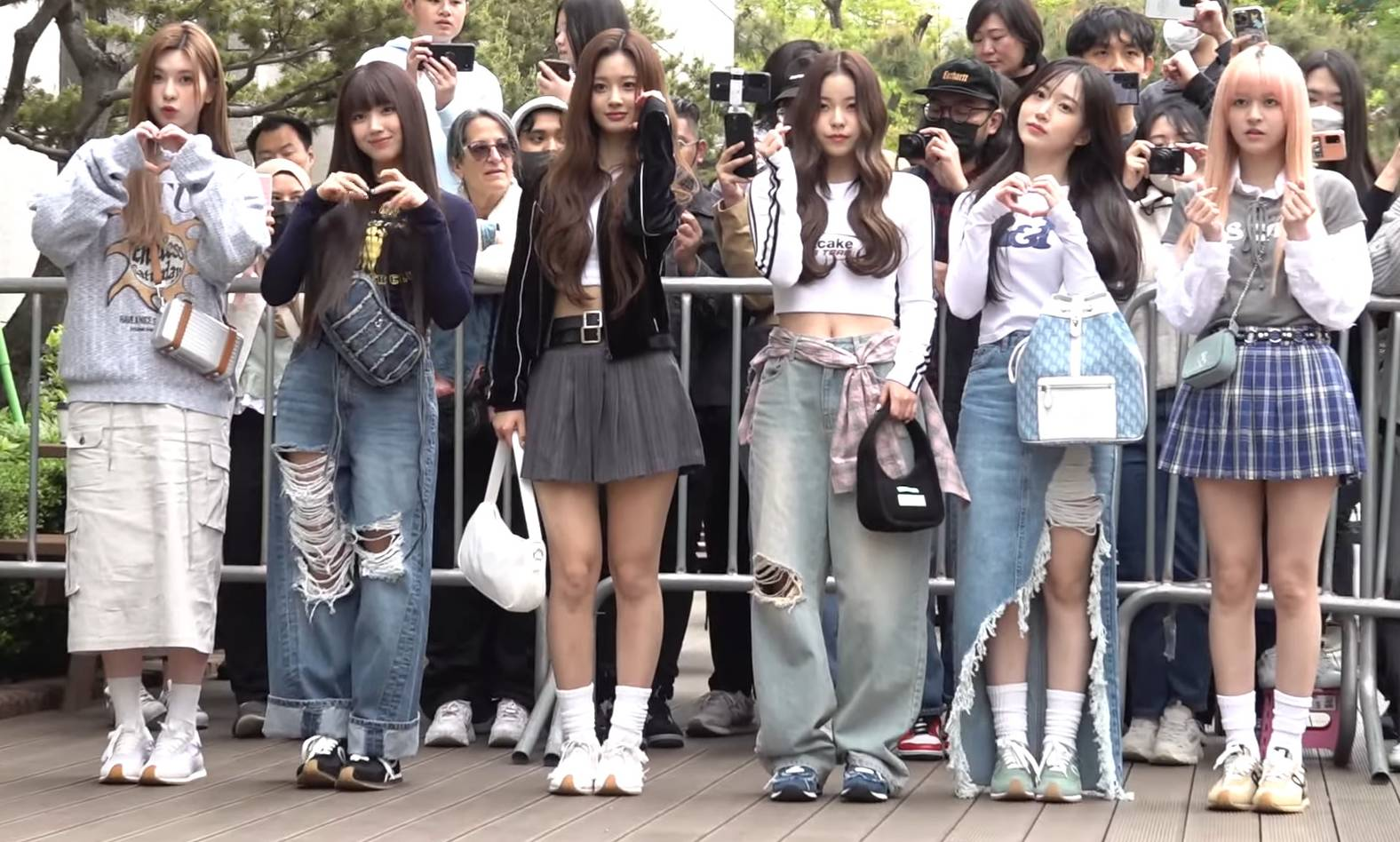
Nmixx in 2023.

On January 26, 2022, a new girl group Nmixx was announced for a February 22 debut, with their debut single album, Ad Mare. After Twice's success in the U.S., JYP Entertainment expanded their partnership with Republic Records in February, by signing both Stray Kids and Itzy under Republic Records for promotions. In April, the market cap of JYP Entertainment had risen from 1.33 trillion KRW in the previous year to 2.24 trillion KRW, an increase of 1 trillion KRW in the first three months of 2022. The company's stock prices soared to 66,200 KRW on April 8, surpassing company's record. On July 12, all nine members of Twice renewed their contracts with the company. On September 26, all members of Day6 renewed their contracts with the company. In December, Jinni left both the company and the group Nmixx, due to personal reasons.

In 2023, the competition show A2K and the second season of Nizi Project both aired. A2K led to the formation of the group Vcha, a joint venture between JYP Entertainment and Republic Records. The second season of Nizi Project concluded with the line up for the boy group Nexz, a joint venture with Sony Records Japan. Both groups released their debut single in 2024.

=== 2024–present: New divisions and management changes ===
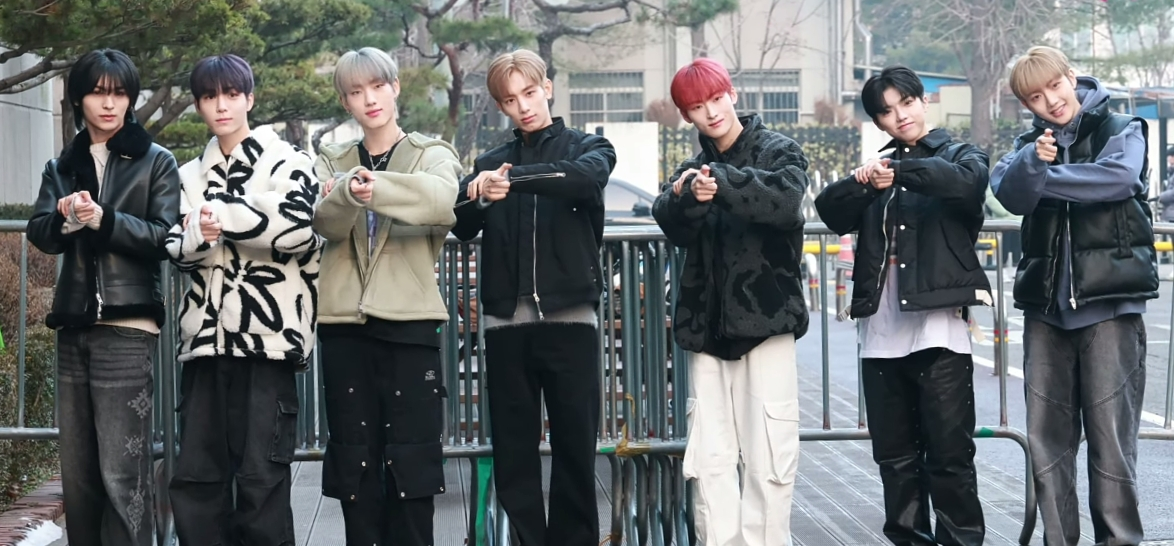
All(H)Ours in 2024.

In January 2024, JYP Entertainment's Eden Entertainment debuted its first group, All(H)Ours. In August, Innit Entertainment was established – the company's management subsidiary for actors and artists.

In 2025, the company's newest boy groups KickFlip and CIIU were launched. The girl group Vcha was rebranded as Girlset in August without original members KG and Kaylee, both of whom left JYP Entertainment. By September, all five members of the girl group Itzy renewed their contact with the company.

In January 2026, the girl group Dodree by JYP Entertainment's Innit Entertainment debuted. In February, a new company in China, Onecead was launched. A joint venture with CJ ENM and Tencent, it launched the boy group Modyssey in the same year. In March, J.Y. Park stepped down as internal director. In July, the girl group Ourbirthday debuted under Innit Entertainment. In August, Jeongyeon and Chaeyoung of the girl group Twice left JYP Entertainment, whilst both remaining in the group. Fellow group member Jihyo also left the company in October. In November, American investment firm Miri Capital Management LLC disclosed a 6.31% stake in the company, equivalent to 2,242,588 shares. The increase followed open-market purchases of 483,996 shares between November 4 and 9.

In 2027, JYP Entertainment's Squ4d would debut its boy group oftheblue. Ahead of their official debut, the group released their pre-debut single Balloon Person (풍선인간) on November 11, 2026.

== Joint ventures ==
JYP Entertainment's records are distributed worldwide by The Orchard since March 2019.

=== KMP Holdings and KT Music ===
In March 2010, KMP Holdings was established via a joint venture between JYP Entertainment, SM Entertainment, YG Entertainment, Star Empire, Media Line, CAN Entertainment and Music Factory Entertainment. KMP Holdings was acquired by KT Music in November 2012. In June 2013, KT Music absorbed KMP's distribution network. In January 2014, the seven talent agencies behind KMP Holdings formed a collective bond partnership and bought 13.48% of KT Music's stocks, leaving KT Corporation with 49.99%.

=== United Asia Management ===
In 2011, JYP Entertainment joined forces with SM Entertainment, YG Entertainment, KeyEast, AMENT and Star J Entertainment to form United Asia Management in an effort to promote Korean pop music internationally.

=== FLO ===
On January 31, 2018, iRiver announced its entry into the South Korean music industry. Together with parent company SK Telecom and music labels SM Entertainment, JYP Entertainment and Big Hit Entertainment, the company launched a new online music store, FLO, in the second half of 2018.

=== Beijing Shinsung Entertainment ===
On April 5, 2017, Ocean Music and JYP Entertainment jointly established the Beijing Xin Sheng Entertainment Co., Ltd. for indoor recreational facilities operation, organization of cultural and artistic exchanges, film and television planning, and other aspects of cooperation. A few months later, J.Y. Park, Jackson Wang, Fei and a 10-year-old JYP Chinese trainee went to China to record a roadshow-style audition show, Guaishushu Is Coming to recruit more trainees with the goal of creating a hip-hop oriented Chinese boy group. The premise was to travel across different cities and select the members who will be trained in South Korea.

=== NCC Entertainment (NCC Station) ===
NCC Entertainment is a jointly produced management team by Tencent Music Corporation and JYP Beijing Cultural Exchange Ltd located in Beijing, China. It is working to promote its Chinese artists more, despite the ban placed on Korean entertainment and to further promote the Chinese boy group, Boy Story in China.

== Divisions and labels ==
=== Divisions ===
- JYP Beijing Cultural Exchange Ltd (JYPE China): The Chinese division of JYP Entertainment. Opened in 2008, it was the company's first external branch. It has two subsidiaries:
  - Fanling Culture Media Ltd
  - Beijing Shisung Ent. Ltd (joint venture with Tencent)
    - NCC Entertainment
      - Onecead (joint venture with CJ ENM and Tencent)
- JYP Entertainment USA Inc: The American division of JYP Entertainment, it was opened in 2007. It was reestablished in 2022.
- JYP Entertainment Japan Inc: The Japanese division of JYP Entertainment, established in 2009.
- JYP Entertainment Hong Kong Ltd: The Hong Kong division of JYP Entertainment, established in 2017.
- JYP Entertainment Latin America: The Latin American division of JYP Entertainment, established in 2024.
- JYP Publishing Corp: An affiliated company founded in February 2008. It houses record producers and songwriters under JYP Entertainment.
- JYP Foods Inc: Founded in 2010.
  - Studio J Bar – opened on June 2, 2016, as a collaboration between JYP and Y1975, a bar in the Chungdam District.
  - The Street – a brunch café with two branches. The main branch is located nearby the JYP Entertainment office building, and the second branch is located in the Gyeongridan area in Itaewon. The café is used for interviews or meetings held by artists under JYP Entertainment.

=== Subsidiaries ===
- Studio J: An in-house label established by J.Y. Park in January 2015, with the goal of putting focus on independent artists outside of the mainstream K-pop aesthetic. The singer G.Soul was the first artist under Studio J.
- Npio Entertainment: An acting division established in 2019, created by Pyo Jong-rok.
- Squ4d: (Note: Pronounced as "squad".) JYP Entertainment's fourth artist management label. Led by Lee Ji-young, it currently manages the girl group Nmixx and boy group oftheblue.
- Innit Entertainment: A management subsidiary established in 2024, to broaden the range of its artists to include ballad, trot, R&B singers and actors.
- Eden Entertainment: Founded by a former executive in JYP as an independent record label.

=== Defunct ===
- JYP Actors: The company's acting division founded in 2011. Led by JYP Entertainment vice-president Pyo Jong-rok. In September 2019, JYP Actors was closed, with its actors moving into a new start-up company, Npio Entertainment.
- JYP Pictures: The company's film and television drama production division founded in March 2011.
  - JYP Pictures Co., Ltd Korea: Established in 2013, it was closed by September 1, 2019.
  - JYP Pictures Co., Ltd China: Established in 2014.
- JYP Creative: The company's American subsidiary corporation, established in November 2011. It was liquidated in 2012, after a net loss of $1.5 million.
- J. Tune Entertainment: A South Korean record label and entertainment company founded by former JYP artist Rain in November 2007. In December 2010, JYP Entertainment had become the largest shareholder of J. Tune Entertainment. In December 2013, J. Tune Entertainment was merged to JYP Entertainment.

== Philanthropy ==
During the COVID-19 pandemic, JYP Entertainment donated US$410 thousand to the Community Chest of South Korea on February 28, 2020. On March 8, 2022, the company made a donation ₩300 million to the Hope Bridge Disaster Relief Association, to help the victims of the massive wildfire that started in Uljin, Gyeongbuk which had spread to Samcheok, Gangwon. On February 12, 2023, the company donated ₩500 million through World Vision International, to help the aftermath of the 2023 Turkey–Syria earthquakes.

== Current artists ==
=== Musicians ===
==== Soloists ====
- J.Y. Park (since 1997)
- Jun. K (since 2011) (Note: Current member of the group 2PM.)
- Wooyoung (since 2012)
- Nichkhun (since 2018)
- Yao Chen (since 2019) (Note: Under JYP Beijing Cultural Exchange Ltd.'s Fanling Culture Media Ltd.)
- Baek A-yeon (since 2019) (Note: Under Eden Entertainment.)
- Young K (since 2021) (Note: Current member of the group Day6.)
- Dowoon (since 2021)
- Wonpil (since 2022)
- Nayeon (since 2022) (Note: Current member of the group Twice.)
- Tzuyu (since 2024)
- Sungjin (since 2024)
- Yeji (since 2025) (Note: Current member of the group Itzy.)
- Yuna (since 2026)
- Chaeryeong (since 2026)
- Lee Know (2027) (Note: Current member of the group Stray Kids.)

==== Groups ====
- 2PM (2008–17, since 2021)
- Twice (since 2015)
- Stray Kids (since 2017)
- Boy Story (since 2017) (Note: Under JYP China.)
- Itzy (since 2019)
- NiziU (since 2020) (Note: Under JYP Entertainment Japan Inc. Co-managed with Sony Music Entertainment Japan.)
- Nmixx (since 2022) (Note: Under Squ4d.)
- MiSaMo (since 2023) (Note: Sub-unit group of Twice.)
- Girlset (since 2023) (Note: Originally known as Vcha. Under JYP Entertainment USA Inc. Co-managed with Republic Records.)
- Nexz (since 2023)
- All(H)Ours (since 2024) (Note: Under Eden Entertainment.)
- KickFlip (since 2025)
- CIIU (since 2025)
- Dodree (since 2026) (Note: Under Innit Entertainment.)
- Modyssey (since 2026) (Note: Under Onecead.)
- Ourbirthday (since 2026) (Note: Under Innit Entertainment.)
- oftheblue (2027)

==== Bands ====
- Day6 (since 2015) (Note: Under Studio J.)
- Day6 (Even of Day) (since 2020) (Note: Sub-unit group of Day6.)
- Xdinary Heroes (since 2021)

=== Actors and actresses ===
Actors under Npio Entertainment, a division under JYP Entertainment.

- Choi Yoon-je
- Kang Hoon
- Kim Dong-hee
- Lee Si-woo
- Park Seo-ham
- Ryu Seung-soo
- Shin Ye-eun
- Yang Byung-yeol

=== Publishing ===
Artists under JYP Publishing, a division under JYP Entertainment.

Producers and songwriters

- J.Y. Park
- Hong Ji-sang
- Sim Eun-jee
- Tommy Park
- Woo Min Lee (collapsedone)
- Honey Pot
  - Cho Hyun-kyung
  - Park Yong-woon
- Garden
- Tigerseoul
- Lee Hae Sol
- Kim Ju Hyeong
- Versachoi
- HotSauce
  - Yang Jeong-sik
  - Mary
- Trippy
- Selah
- Saint
- Seoha
- Minkyu

Lyricist

- Jennifer Eunsoo Kim

Singer-songwriter

- Kass

== Former artists ==
=== Former musicians ===
==== Soloists ====
- Pearl (1997–2000)
- Park Ji-yoon (2000–03)
- Rain (2002–07)
- Byul (2002–06)
- Lim Jeong-hee (2005–12)
- Joo (2008–15)
- San E (2010–13)
- Jeong Jin-woon (2011–15)
- Jo Kwon (2012–17)
- Lee Jun-ho (2013–25)
- Sunmi (2013–17)
- Ha:tfelt (2014–17)
- Bernard Park (2014–22)
- G.Soul (2015–17)
- Yerin Baek (2015–19)
- Fei (2016–18)
- Park Ji-min (2016–19)
- Jeon Somi (2017–18)
- Suzy (2017–19)
- Yubin (2018–20)
- Jihyo (2023–26)
- Chaeyoung (2025–26)
- Youngbin (2025–26)

==== Groups ====
Former groups signed to JYP Entertainment, which had all their members leave the company.

- g.o.d (2003–05) (Note: Group members formerly signed to JYP Entertainment: Danny Ahn (2003–05); Yoon Kye-sang (2003–05); Kim Tae-woo (1998–2006); Son Ho-young (2003–06); Joon Park (2003–06))
- Noel (2002–07) (Note: Group members formerly signed to JYP Entertainment: Jeon Woo-sung (2002–07); Lee Sang-gon (2002–07); Na Sung-ho (2002–07); Kang Kyun-sung (2002–07))
- Wonder Girls (2007–17) (Note: Group members formerly signed to JYP Entertainment: Hyuna (2006–08); Sohee (2006–13); Sunye (2006–15); Sunmi (2006–17); Yeeun (2006–17); Yubin (2007–20); Hyerim (2010–20))
- 2AM (2008–10, 2014–17) (Note: Group members formerly signed to JYP Entertainment: Lee Chang-min (2008–10, 2014–15); Jeong Jin-woon (2008–10, 2014–15); Lim Seul-ong (2008–10, 2014–15); Jo Kwon (2008–10, 2014–17))
- Miss A (2010–17) (Note: Group members formerly signed to JYP Entertainment: Jia (2010–16); Min (2010–17); Fei (2010–18); Suzy (2010–19))
- 15& (2012–19) (Note: Group members formerly signed to JYP Entertainment: Park Jimin (2012–19); Baek Yerin (2012–19))
- JJ Project (2012–13, sub-unit group of Got7 in 2017) (Note: Group members formerly signed to JYP Entertainment: JB (2012–21); Jinyoung (2012–21))
- Got7 (2014–21) (Note: Group members formerly signed to JYP Entertainment: Mark (2014–21); JB (2012–21); Jackson (2014–21); Jinyoung (2012–21); Youngjae (2014–21); BamBam (2014–21); Yugyeom (2014–21))
- Jus2 (2019–21, sub-unit group of Got7) (Note: Group members formerly signed to JYP Entertainment: JB (2012–21); Yugyeom (2014–21))

==== Group members ====
Former artists signed to JYP Entertainment as a group member, with their respective group still under the company as an active group.

- Jay Park (2PM, 2008–10)
- Ok Taec-yeon (2PM, 2008–17) (Note: After leaving JYP Entertainment, Ok Taec-yeon remains as a member of 2PM.)
- Hwang Chan-sung (2PM, 2008–22) (Note: After leaving JYP Entertainment, Hwang Chan-sung remains as a member of 2PM.)
- Lee Jun-ho (2PM, 2008–25) (Note: After leaving JYP Entertainment, Lee Jun-ho remains as a member of 2PM.)
- Junhyeok (Day6, 2015–16)
- Jae (Day6, 2015–21)
- Jeongyeon (Twice, 2015–26) (Note: After leaving JYP Entertainment, Jeongyeon remains as a member of Twice.)
- Jihyo (Twice, 2015–26) (Note: After leaving JYP Entertainment, Jihyo remains as a member of Twice.)
- Chaeyoung (Twice, 2015–26) (Note: After leaving JYP Entertainment, Chaeyoung remains as a member of Twice.)
- Woojin (Stray Kids, 2017–19)
- Gunil (Xdinary Heroes, 2021–26)
- Jinni (Nmixx, 2022)
- KG (Vcha, 2023–24)
- Kaylee (Vcha, 2023–25)

=== Former actors and actresses ===
- Cho Yi-hyun (2018–19)
- Choi Woo-shik (2012–18)
- Jang Dong-ju
- Jang Hee-ryung
- Jung Gun-joo
- Kang Yoon-je
- Kim Ha-eun (2007–08)
- Kim Ji-min
- Kim Jong-mun
- Kim Ye-won (2015–18)
- Kim Yu-an
- Lee Gi-hyuk
- Lee Ji-hyun
- Lee Jung-jin (2012–16)
- Min Hyo-rin (2014–17)
- Nam Sung-jun
- Park Gyu-young (2015–19)
- Park Ji-bin (2015–17)
- Park Joo-hyung
- Park Si-eun (2017–19)
- Ryu Won
- Shin Eun-soo (2014–25)
- Song Ha-yoon (2013—19)
- Wei Daxun (2014–17)
- Yoon Park (2013–19)
- Yeon Jung-hoon (2011)

== Concerts ==
Lists of concerts by JYP Entertainment
Concert	Date(s)	City	Country	Venue
JYP Nation 2010 "Team Play"	December 24, 2010	Seoul	South Korea	Olympic Gymnastics Arena
JYP Nation in Japan 2011	August 17–18, 2011	Saitama	Japan	Saitama Super Arena
JYP Nation 2012	August 4, 2012	Seoul	South Korea	Olympic Gymnastics Arena
JYP Nation 2012	August 18–19, 2012	Tokyo	Japan	Yoyogi National Gymnasium
JYP Nation 2014 "One Mic"	August 9–10, 2014	Seoul	South Korea	Jamsil Arena
JYP Nation 2014 "One Mic"	August 30, 2014	Hong Kong		AsiaWorld-Expo
JYP Nation 2014 "One Mic"	September 5–7, 2014	Tokyo	Japan	Yoyogi National Gymnasium
JYP Nation 2014 "One Mic"	December 13, 2014	Bangkok	Thailand	Impact Arena
JYP Nation 2016 "Mix & Match"	August 6–7, 2016	Seoul	South Korea	Jamsil Arena
JYP Nation 2016 "Mix & Match"	September 2–4, 2016	Tokyo	Japan	Yoyogi National Gymnasium
