= Joe Chester =

Irish composer and musician

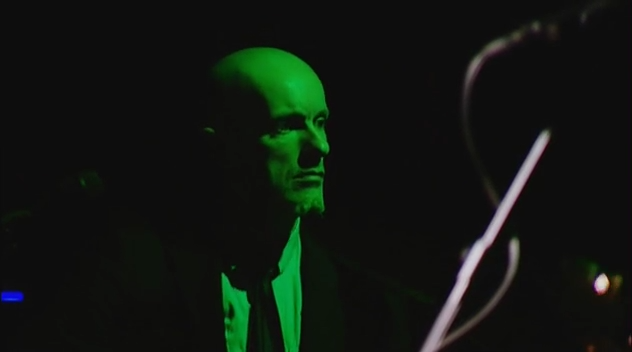
Chester performing with The Waterboys in 2010

Joseph Chester, also known as Joe Chester, is an Irish composer and musician. His albums have won acclaim, including A Murder of Crows, The Easter Vigil (which was named the "Best Irish Album" of 2017), and Jupiter's Wife (the Best Irish album of 2020 according to the Irish Daily Mirror).

In recent years, he has turned his attention to composing contemporary music for classical guitar. His first major commission, LUCIA, was commissioned by Axis Ballymun for the centenary of James Joyce's Ulysses. The piece was inspired by fragments of the life of Lucia Joyce, James Joyce's daughter. According to The Irish Times, it was "deft and well-considered, the work spins and soars. An elegant, discordant gem." The Times called it "a stunning tribute."

He has been a guitarist for many groups, including The Waterboys and for Gemma Hayes. He is also the producer and guitarist of Dublin band A Lazarus Soul.

== 1990 - 2000 ==
From 1990, he worked as an engineer and producer in Dublin's Elektra and then Sun Studios. Chester recorded many of the emerging bands of the vibrant and celebrated underground indie scene of the time, including Sack, Sunbear, The Plague Monkeys, Turn, Nina Hynes, Doctor Millar, Future Kings of Spain, Ten Speed Racer, Bobby Pulls A Wilson in addition to many others.

Having played guitars and keyboards on several of these records, he joined Sunbear as keyboardist and guitarist in 1994. The band landed a record deal with Tom Zutaut's (the man who signed Guns N' Roses) The Enclave, a subsidiary of EMI Records. They went into the studio for several months to record their debut album. However, shortly after signing, both EMI and The Enclave were shut down, resulting in the recordings being shelved.

He then formed a band with Nina Hynes called Nina and The Dreamweavers. After a residency in Dublin's Whelan's venue, the band signed with Reverb Records. After several months of recording what would become the first Nina Hynes record, Creation, the band went on to perform two tours in the United States. Many of the recordings from this time remain unreleased.

Around this time, he recorded some of the first demos for Gemma Hayes's first record as well as records by Halite (Graham Hopkin's band), Juniper (featuring Damien Rice and members of Bell X1), Nick Kelly and Doctor Millar.

He signed a publishing deal with UK publisher Daylight Robbery in 1997. He went into Trevor Hutchinson's Marguerite Studios in Dublin for several months to make his first solo record, Winter, under the name The Sound of Bells. Winter was never released, although four tracks - "Worldwept", "Spiritbuilding", "Dorian", and "Are You Paul Varjak?" - were released as 7-inch singles by Daylight Robbery.

Around this time, under the guidance of Trevor Hutchinson, he began recording many Irish traditional artists. This included Lunasa with whom he went on tour to record their shows from which he compiled their first album. He also recorded Breda Smyth, The Barleyshakes, and Gerry O'Beirne amongst others.

== Ten Speed Racer ==
While on tour in America, Chester joined Ten Speed Racer. On returning to Ireland, he went into Sun Studios in Dublin to begin recordings for Eskimo Beach Boy, their first album.

In 2000, Ten Speed Racer released Eskimo Beach Boy on Reverb Records in Ireland and on Catapult Records in the USA. The album was recorded and mixed by Chester at Sun Studios in Dublin, who also played guitars, keyboards, and sang backing vocals. The album garnered rave reviews, with Hot Press saying "the playing throughout is both subtle and superb, and the production is also first-class." However, the band parted ways with Reverb Records and signed to UK Indie label Red Flag Records for their follow-up album.

Recordings for that follow-up began again at Sun Studios in Dublin with Chester producing. Several tracks from these sessions remain unreleased. The band decided to quit Dublin and moved en masse to a large farmhouse in rural Wexford where they set up a rehearsal and recording studio. This was where they would live together for the next three years.

After a period of writing, the band decamped to Livingston Studios in London to record the EP Girls & Magazines, with Chester producing. The EP, released in 2002 on Red Flag Records, was characterised by a shift to shared songwriting duties. Three of the five songs were written by the band's singer, Dermot Barrett, and two by Chester. He had written "It Ain't Gonna Last" and the single, "Don't Go Out". The EP had been preceded by a single, "Listen to Bits" which was also written by Chester.

Both singles and the EP garnered significant airplay in the UK and Ireland, with "Don't Go Out" in particular being championed by Tom Dunne on his Pet Sounds show on Today FM. This led to a protracted period of touring and promotion in the UK including sessions on BBC Radio 6 and XFM.

The band returned to Wexford to begin writing their second album. Recording for the album began at Chapel Studios in Lincolnshire, in late 2002. The band decided to record with no producer, but Darren Alison was drafted in to mix. The resulting album, 10SR, was released on Red Flag Records on 19 November 2003. The artwork for the album and accompanying singles was by celebrated 4AD artist Vaughan Oliver. The album was mastered at Abbey Road Studios by Nick Webb with Allison and Chester in attendance.

Shortly after the release of 10SR, Chester left the band. He continued to live at the farmhouse in Wexford while he began to work on a solo album, which would become A Murder of Crows.

== A Murder of Crows ==
Beginning in 2003, Chester began writing the songs that would feature on the album A Murder of Crows. Some songs, such as "Charlie for a Girl", were originally intended for the second Ten Speed Racer album but were deemed unsuitable. Another song, "A Drop of Rain", had originally appeared on the unreleased Sound of Bells album Winter six years previously. The rest of the tracks were written in a burst of songwriting and recording at his home studio in Wexford through 2003 and into 2004.

In 2004, looking for feedback, he sent a rough, unmixed version of the album to Tom Dunne. Dunne had previously been a champion of the Chester-penned Ten Speed Racer single, "Don't Go Out". Rather than provide feedback, Dunne immediately played both the title track and "Charlie for a Girl" on his Pet Sounds radio show that night, playing "Charlie for a Girl" twice. He has since described A Murder of Crows as one of the best albums he ever had sent into the show and "one of the top ten albums I turn to when I want to lift my soul."

Moving back to Dublin, Chester set about finishing the album, with Bryan McMahon of Future Kings of Spain playing drums and Gemma Hayes providing vocals on "A Safe Place to Hide".

Meanwhile, Dunne was continuing to play the unfinished tracks on his show every night. This led to invitations to play showcases in late 2004 at Hard Working Class Heroes in Dublin (a full band show featuring Gemma Hayes) and a televised solo set on RTE's Other Voices.

Chester signed a licensing deal to release the album with BARP, a label set up by Damien Rice's manager, Bernadette Barrett.

A Murder of Crows was released on BARP on 25 February 2005. Reviews were ecstatic, Hot Press described it as "melodic genius, an absolute joy", The Sunday Times as "a perfect pop record", and The Irish Times as "A modern alternative pop gem".

The album has become a cult classic, with many musicians citing it as an inspiration. It has been featured in the books 101 Irish Albums to Hear Before You Die by Tony Clayton-Lea and Buried Treasure Vol 2 by Dan Hegarty. It is often included on lists of the best Irish albums of all time.

In 2017, Bohemia Records released A Murder of Crows (Special Edition) which featured the original album in addition to live tracks and demos as well as liner notes by Tom Dunne, Tony Clayton-Lea and Dan Hegarty.

Unfortunately, despite glowing reviews and nominations in the Choice Music Prize and the Meteor Irish Music Awards, A Murder of Crows did not get an international release. As a result, by 2006, Chester found himself dropped by his manager, label and publisher in quick succession.

== The Tiny Pieces Left Behind ==
On 14 April 2008, he released his second solo album, The Tiny Pieces Left Behind on his own label, United Pacific Recordings. Being self-financed, it was recorded at Cauldron Studios in Dublin. It was initially mixed at Black Box Studios by David Odlum. However, the released version features a mix by Chester himself. As more of a full-band record than its predecessor, it featured Binzer Brennan on drums and Ann Scott and Gemma Hayes on additional vocals.

The first single from the album was "Maybe This is Not Love" which was premiered by Tony Fenton on his Today FM show and named Irish Single of 2008 by John Meagher in the Irish Independent.

The reviews were positive, with Totally Dublin saying, "Connected to the thumping indie-pop heart at the centre of this opus are veins of bittersweet twists, electro influenced turns, and gratifying avenues."

Adrienne Murphy, writing in Hot Press, declared it a humdinger, comparing it to John Lennon and Neil Young. "It's that good! There are lots of goodies on The Tiny Pieces Left Behind, but the best for me has to be the beautiful Fluorescent Light, which I listened to compulsively 15 times in a row until I'd learned it by heart. Well done, Mr Chester. The Tiny Pieces Left Behind is a great album."

The difficult circumstances of making the record led Chester to step back from live performances. A one-off album launch show at Whelan's was his last show for several years. The show was all-acoustic and featured Gemma Hayes and Ann Scott. They played most of the new album and a selection from A Murder of Crows.

== Working with Gemma Hayes ==
Simultaneous to the recording of The Tiny Pieces Left Behind, Chester was recording guitars and vocals at Black Box Studios in Dublin for the forthcoming Gemma Hayes album, The Hollow of Morning. Hayes and Chester first worked together in the 1990s, recording demos for her first album and again on "A Safe Place to Hide" from A Murder of Crows. This was a more long-lasting partnership as, after the launch of The Tiny Pieces Left Behind, Chester embarked on an extended period as Gemma's live guitarist. This was first as part of a band including Binzer Brennan and Karl Odlum and then as a duo. Long tours of Ireland, the UK, America and Europe followed, including stints opening for My Bloody Valentine on their reunion tour. Their last show together took place at Dublin's Crawdaddy in April 2010. A recording of their version of Kate Bush's Cloudbusting from this show was featured on Gemma's live album Night and Day.

Although they have not performed together live since, they reunited in 2015 for promotional appearances in Paris and in Dublin, including RTE's The Works, TG4 Imeall, Today FM's Ian Dempsey show, RTL 2 and La Bruit de Graviers.

== The Waterboys ==
In 2010, Mike Scott of The Waterboys recruited Chester into a new extended lineup of the band he was putting together for a ground-breaking run of shows at Dublin's Abbey Theatre called An Appointment With Mr. Yeats. According to the concert programme, "Mike Scott headhunted Chester for Mr. Yeats after hearing and loving his albums."

The show consisted of the poetry of W. B. Yeats set to Scott's music. Beginning with jam sessions at Scott's Dublin home, the pair (subsequently joined by Katie Kim) worked for several months on vocal arrangements before the full band convened at Smock Alley Theatre for full production rehearsals.

The show ran for five sold-out nights at the Abbey Theatre before it went out on a tour of Ireland and the UK. A subsequent studio album was made with recordings that took place in London and Dublin. The shows were incendiary, and critics raved.

In reviewing the show, RTÉ said that to have an audience of all ages and different nationalities hanging on every line and chord of almost entirely new material was some achievement - "Scott and his band could've played the whole set twice and still had people wanting more."

A 5-star review of the Barbican show in London in The Daily Telegraph said it was, "one of the most magical shows you could hope to see."

Chester's first stint in The Waterboys ended in 2012, although he returned for a run of classic Waterboys shows in 2014 and has occasionally performed with them as a special guest since.

== Performing with Sinéad O'Connor ==
On 10 December 2011, Chester performed a duo set with Sinéad O'Connor to celebrate the 50th birthday of Amnesty International Ireland. The concert took place at Amnesty Ireland's headquarters in Dublin. The set included O'Connor's songs "The Healing Room", "Whomsoever Dwells" and "Thank You for Hearing Me".

== She Darks Me ==
While touring with Gemma Hayes and The Waterboys, Chester had begun experimenting with a fresh approach to his songwriting. This involved using material from short stories he had written as lyrics for new songs. These songs ultimately became the album She Darks Me, his third solo album which was released in 2011.

It became a much more organic-sounding album than anything he had previously done. The album once again featured Binzer Brennan on drums along with fellow and former Waterboys members Steve Wickham (fiddle) and Trevor Hutchinson (bass), as well as harmonica by Mickey Raphael, whom Chester had met in Dublin.

The album contained nine originals and a cover of Bob Dylan's "Most of the Time".

Hotpress expressed that "[the] Irish artist's masterwork is one of those rare albums that can dig deep, capturing the complexities and subtleties inherent in any relationship."

The Irish Times believed that "Several tracks (notably Acid Rain, Foreign Correspondent, and Heart of Stone) bear his hallmark attention to observant detail. Musically, it's Chester's usual mix of innate melody and carefully prepared arrangements."

After initially being released in download-only form and then deleted, in 2017 Bohemia Records released a remixed and remastered version of She Darks Me on CD and digital.

== A Lazarus Soul ==
In 2001, A Lazarus Soul released their first album, titled Record. The album was produced by Chester, who also played guitar and keyboard. The band has had a fluid lineup ever since, including members of Ten Speed Racer, Future Kings of Spain and Mexican Pets. Each iteration of the lineup being built around the songs and voice of Brian Brannigan. However, in 2011, after a show paying tribute to Mark E. Smith of The Fall, Chester joined the band as full-time guitarist. This came after having had a long association with the band, producing every album. This lineup, featuring Anton Hegarty on bass and Julie Bienvenu on drums, went on to make the albums Last of the Analogue Age and The D They Put Between the R & L. The later featured the much-loved single "Long Balconies".

In 2024 the band released the album, "No Flowers Grow in Cement Gardens," which entered the Irish Independent Albums Chart at Number 1, reaching Number 9 in the overall chart. The band played an Irish tour culminating with a sold-out show at Dublin's Vicar Street. The album was subsequently nominated for the 2025 Choice Music Prize, a return to the event for Chester having been nominated in the inaugural event in 2005.

== The Easter Vigil ==
In January 2017, Chester returned after a six-year gap with a new single, "Juliette Walking in the Rain". An accompanying video was filmed on the Col de Turini on the French/Italian border. It was the first single from his fifth solo album, The Easter Vigil, released on 24 February 2017. The song was inspired by seeing French actress Juliette Binoche walking across Meeting House Square in Dublin at night.

Alan Corr of RTÉ, in an interview with Chester from his new home in France said, "It's an album full of striking imagery. Spy Wednesday bristles with lyrics worthy of Elvis Costello and on Like a Rose Tattoo, he sings about "the national razor," a decidedly sinister sounding implement."

In describing the writing of the song, "Like a Rose Tattoo", Chester recounted a staging of the play The Rose Tattoo by Tennessee Williams in the fifties at the Pike Theatre and how uproar ensued after one of the characters dropped a condom on stage. On the instructions of Archbishop McQuaid, the theatre was raided and the cast was arrested. This was the starting point of "Like A Rose Tattoo", "but there's a bit of Hilton Edwards and Michael MacLiammoir in there too."

Chester described his process as "a little bit of a stream of consciousness but it's very hard to say with all the songs on the album that this song is about this or that. It's more like trying to create a sound world in each song and then bring people in to inhabit a world for four minutes."

Speaking in the Irish Daily Mirror, he spoke about how rising rents in his home city of Dublin had forced him to emigrate: "We were renting a place in Dublin, and we were getting by as it was, but we were looking at a rent increase and life was becoming impossible. We felt we had to up sticks and get the f**k out."

Speaking about the song "Valley of Tears", he talked about how it was inspired on the surface by a story he had heard on the Aran Islands. "But, like James Joyce said, the quickest way to Tara is via Holyhead. I never would have written a song like that in Ireland".

In terms of the overarching themes of the album, it is structured like a Passion, beginning with "Spy Wednesday", continuing through Holy Thursday on "Like A Rose Tattoo", through to "The Easter Vigil" itself and finishing on Easter Sunday with "Not A Christian Anymore". In a 2017 interview with RTÉ, Chester described the album as being "about the rewinding of a man's faith. The loss of belief, almost a perverse enlightenment told through the story of the passion."

The record received rave reviews with Hot Press describing it as, "genuinely breathtaking, truly transcendent, melody incarnate, brimming with chiming guitar chords and wistful lyrics" and The Sunday Business Post stating that "The Easter Vigil is his most profound and moving work yet."- RTE, The devil may indeed always lurk amidst the details, but it takes the confidence of a master to allow the magic to flourish deep inside the quiet. - Blackpool Sentinel

It was Album of The Week on RTÉ Lyric FM and Newstalk and Irish Album of the Year in the Irish Daily Sun.

The album was launched with a sold-out show at Dublin's Unitarian Church. Chester did a full performance of the album with Steve Wickham playing the fiddle, Vyvienne Long playing the cello and Brian Brannigan of A Lazarus Soul on keyboard. In December 2017, Chester performed at the Grand Social in Dublin accompanied by Long and Wickham. The performance was recorded and released as an album, Brightly the keys, all twinkling, linked in September 2026.

== Jupiter's Wife ==
In late 2017, Chester travelled to Memphis, Tennessee, to begin recordings for what would become the double album Jupiter's Wife at Sam Phillips's Sun Studio. Speaking in 2020, in the accompanying audio commentary for the album, Chester spoke of how he travelled by train from Chicago to Memphis, still working on the lyrics for the songs that would be recorded there. This included "Staying Together for the Children", "My Shipwrecked Mind", "Red Balloon" and "Novena", all of which were recorded to tape on the original 1950s equipment and microphones. This equipment had previously been used on countless iconic recordings, from Howlin' Wolf to Jackie Brenston and Elvis Presley.

The album was released on 1 May 2020, in the middle of the first COVID-19 lockdown, thus making any live promotion impossible. Instead, the album was accompanied by a launch film, The Candle From The Shadow. It was filmed during lockdown in the south of France and featured live performances of "Is Cuimhin Liom", "The Heart of Saint Laurence O'Toole", "Synge's Chair", "Staying Together for the Children", "Hilton & Michael" as well as "Juliette Walking in the Rain" from The Easter Vigil.

The album was named best Irish album of 2020 in the Irish Daily Mirror, who also described it as the best Irish album of the decade. It was also named Album of the Week on both RTÉ Lyric FM and Playirish Radio, as well as receiving rave reviews in both the Irish and French media with long, prose reviews in Benzine Magazine comparing it to early Waterboys and Van Morrison. Magic Revue Pop Moderne described it as folk in its purest form. RTÉ's review simply stated that Chester now belonged in the rarified territory occupied by the likes of Robert Forster of the Go-Betweens.

There were no live shows to promote the album due to the ongoing pandemic. Instead, in late 2020, Axis Ballymun hosted a special concert film, Under The Ragged Thorn, which featured a full-length solo set from Chester. The set was filmed in the 17th century baroque chapel, l'Eglise du Gésu in Nice, France. The film, which was shot live but with no audience present, opened with Chester's arrangement of "O'Farrell's Slip Jig" on classical guitar. This was followed by performances of songs from all of his six albums, beginning with "A Murder of Crows" and finishing with "Hilton & Michael" from Jupiter's Wife. The concert was released as a live album in January 2021.

Speaking about the album, Chester underlined the retrospective nature of the record and how it was likely to be his last album for some years to come.

== LUCIA ==
Chester had made an arrangement for classical guitar of "O'Farrell's Slip Jig", which opened the live album Under The Ragged Thorn in 2020. He continued to explore the instrument with an EP, Carolan/Cage, released under the name Joseph Chester on 1 October 2021. The EP contained transcriptions for classical guitar of Turlough O'Carolan's "Sí Bheag, Sí Mhór" and John Cage's "Dream". Carolan/Cage went to number 1 in the global Contemporary Classical chart on Bandcamp.

In early 2022, he announced his latest project on social media. The project, which he had been working for the previous two years, was an instrumental suite for classical guitar and strings, named Lucia. It was inspired by the life of Lucia Joyce, daughter of James Joyce, a talented dancer who had been diagnosed with schizophrenia and subsequently spent 47 years in institutions until she died in an English asylum in 1982.

The piece was commissioned by Axis Ballymun. It had its world premiere at Axis Ballymun, with Chester on guitar accompanied by a string section named The Sound of Bells on Bloomsday. The premier was on 16 June 2022, the centenary year of Ulysses.

There were further performances at the All Together Now Festival and a special adaptation for solo guitar at Dublin's James Joyce Centre.

The piece was recorded and released on CD, vinyl and streaming on the Bohemia Records label on 28 January 2023. There was an album launch, Fragments of Lucia, at the Smock Alley Theatre, Dublin.

The Sunday Times called it "a stunning tribute to the lost Joyce daughter." No More Workhorse said it was "an extraordinary piece of work". The Irish Times gave it 4 stars, saying that the expansive study of mental illness, "spins and soars," while the Irish Independent called it "a quietly beautiful triumph." The Irish Daily Mail simply called it, "A triumph." The BBC review was that it was "a beautiful piece of work."

There were several special features on the album in the press and on radio, including on BBC's Classical Connections and RTÉ Radio 1's Arena. RTE Lyric FM broadcast a lengthy analysis and review of the album and the Three Castles Burning podcast devoted a whole show to it. A live interview with Chester and Irish Times journalist Eamon Sweeney was recorded at the All Together Now festival.

LUCIA, and its solo incarnation Fragments of Lucia, have gone on to be performed at a reprise at Axis Ballymun as well as at shows in Paris and a solo performance at the James Joyce Tower and Museum in Sandycove. This performance was recorded for a live album, Fragments of Lucia, which was released on 4 August 2023.

Chester also released a follow-up to Carolan/Cage titled Carolan/Bach, which was released on 7 April 2023.
