= Dermot Murphy =

Dermot or Diarmuid Murphy may refer to:

- Dermot Murphy (actor), Irish actor
- Dermot Murphy (rugby union) in 2010 end-of-year rugby union tests
- Diarmuid Murphy (born 1975), Gaelic footballer
- Diarmuid Murphy (writer) (1895–1966), Irish writer, theatre and film producer
