= Nick Kelly (musician) =

Musician and filmmaker

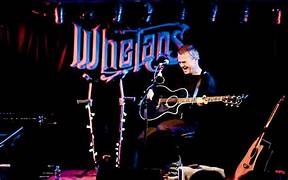

Background information
- Origin: Dublin, Ireland
- Genres: Alternative; Rock; Indie
- Occupations: Musician, Filmmaker, Advertising Creative
- Years active: 1986-present
- Label: Last Night From Glasgow
- Member of: Dogs, Alien Envoy, The Fat Lady Sings
- Website: https://nickkelly.ie/

Nick Kelly is a musical artist, film maker and advertising creative from Dublin.

He first came to prominence as lead singer and songwriter with The Fat Lady Sings and has subsequently recorded and released music as an independent solo artist under his own name and as Alien Envoy, and in various collaborations including most recently with Seán Millar as Dogs.

He has written and directed films since 2003 including the short film Shoe, the drama feature film The Drummer and The Keeper and the feature documentary The Song Cycle.

He has written advertising campaigns and directed TV commercials for many leading brands operating in Ireland.

== Music ==
Between 1986 and 1994 Kelly was the lead singer, songwriter and founder of The Fat Lady Sings.

Following his decision to split The Fat Lady Sings and move back from London where the band had been based to his native Dublin, Kelly released his debut solo album Between Trapezes independently on his own Self Possessed Records label, having funded the pressing with contributions from 300 fans. At the 1988 Heineken / Hot Press Irish Music Critics Awards, Kelly was nominated in three categories, and won the Best Male Solo Artist Award. In 2012, Between Trapezes was one of the featured albums in Tony Clayton Lea's book 101 Irish Records You Must Hear Before You Die.

Kelly released his second solo album Running Dog in 2005. Running Dog was nominated for Irish album of the year at the inaugural Choice Music Prize.

In 2007, Kelly released a series of three singles under the pseudonym Alien Envoy on fictitious label Mothership Records.

In 2009, he launched the Gestation project, for which he performed a gig each month for nine months in Whelans, Dublin, working with different musicians and recording and sharing performances of new songs online. This project resulted in the live album Nine Lives which he again released as Alien Envoy.

In 2013 Kelly collaborated with Joe Chester, Julie Feeney and Seán Millar, performing together for a short series of live dates in Dublin, Dundalk and Cork as The Peripheral Visionaries.

In 2014, Kelly released the first Alien Envoy studio album Loads. For one of the singles taken off the album Resolution Kelly wrote and directed a video featuring an array of well-known figures, including Tom Dunne, Panti Bliss, Cait O'Riordan, David McWilliams, Mario Rosenstock, Peter Coonan, Pat Kinevane and Steve Wall.

In 2015, he was voted #3 Best Irish Songwriter in Hot Press Magazine's annual Readers' Poll.

In 2018, Kelly formed The Unelectables a supergroup of "former future rock stars" with Seán Millar (The Cute Hoors), Paul Byrne (In Tua Nua), Leslie Keye (The Wilde Oscars) and solo artist and arranger Darragh O'Toole. The Unelectables performed occasional live shows, including festival appearances at the Electric Picnic where they were acclaimed "Best Dressed Performers" by the Irish Times. In 2019 they released a single, Hairtrigger, written and sung by Kelly and Millar.

In June 2022, Nick Kelly and Sean Millar embarked on a sustainable journey from Dublin to the Glastonbury Festival, performing shows en route in Carmarthen, Swansea, Cardiff and Bristol before playing two live sets at the Bread and Roses stage in Glastonbury. This journey provided the basis for Kelly's feature documentary The Song Cycle.

They reprised their journey to Glastonbury in 2023, and The Song Cycle was featured by BBC Television in their Glastonbury Festival Coverage.

In 2022, Nick Kelly and Sean Millar formed a new collaboration called Dogs and in late 2024 they released their debut album Joy on Scottish label Last Night From Glasgow.

In October 2024 The Fat Lady Sings' song Arclight was voted one of the Top 50 Irish songs of all time by a panel of 50 Irish Music Critics.

== Film ==
Kelly wrote and directed his first short film Delphine in 2003 under the Irish Film Board's Short Shorts scheme. His second short Why The Irish Dance That Way was made under the RTÉ / Arts Council Dance On The Box scheme and won Best Short Film, Live Action at the Chicago Irish Film Festival 2008.

His third short film Shoe starring Pat Kinevane and Peter Coonan won Best Irish Short at the Corona Fastnet Short Film Festival 2011, and was shortlisted for Oscar nomination at the 2011 Academy Awards.

Kelly's debut feature film The Drummer & the Keeper (starring Dermot Murphy and Jacob McCarthy in the lead roles) premiered at the Galway Film Fleadh 2017, where it won Best Irish First Feature and enjoyed a nationwide Irish cinema release. It went on to win 18 awards on the international festival circuit. The Drummer and The Keeper was nominated in 5 categories at the 2018 IFTA Awards, with Jacob McCarthy winning Rising Star for his portrayal of Christopher.

In 2024 Kelly wrote, directed, produced, and starred in The Song Cycle, a microbudget feature documentary about his own journey by bicycle to perform at the 2022 Glastonbury Festival. The Song Cycle had its world premiere at the Galway Film Fleadh 2024, where it won Best Independent Film. It subsequently received the Audience Choice for Irish Feature at the Irish Film Institute Documentary Festival 2024. The film is scheduled for release in 2026.

== Advertising ==
Following his decision to split The Fat Lady Sings and return to his native Dublin, Kelly began working as an advertising copywriter, and secured a job with Irish International / BBDO where he worked between 1996 and 2003.

During this time he wrote campaigns for the Hibernian Insurance, the Irish Independent, Aer Lingus, the Telecom Eireann IPO, Walkers Crisps, and most notably Guinness for whom he created a number of Masterbrand TV spots including the Clio Award winning Tom Crean and Quarrel which featured a young Michael Fassbender.

Since 2003 he has worked as a freelance creative, writing and directing campaigns for clients including AIB, Bord Gais Networks, the Simon Communities, the Irish Film Archive (featuring Saoirse Ronan), Barry's Tea, Newstalk, Yuno Energy and Clonakilty Black Pudding.

He has served as a judge and a guest speaker for the Kinsale Shark Awards.

== Journalism and other writings ==
In the 1980s Kelly contributed music reviews and features to various Irish and UK publications, including Smash Hits, NME, Hot Press and In Dublin Magazine. He was employed as Staff Writer by EMAP Publication Commodore User between 1987 and 1989, and also occasionally contributed to Computer & Video Games Magazine.

Kelly's brief career in music criticism caused some confusion when his namesake journalist Nick Kelly started writing for Hot Press in the 1990s.

In 1996, his short story Expect Jail was a winner of the Ian St James International Award for New Fiction.

== Personal life ==
Kelly is the eldest of the five children of the politician and legal academic John M. Kelly and Delphine Dudley. His siblings include the economist David Kelly and the writer Julia Kelly. He is married to Supreme Court Judge Niamh Hyland. They have two sons. He lives in Dublin.

== Discography ==
The Fat Lady Sings

- Twist (1991)
- Johnson (1993)

Nick Kelly Solo

- Between Trapezes (1997)
- Running Dog (2005)

Alien Envoy

- Nine Lives (2011)
- Loads (2014)

Dogs

- Tricks EP (2022)
- Joy (2024)

See full Nick Kelly discography at Discogs

== Filmography ==
- Delphine (Short Film) 2003 - Writer, Director
- Why The Irish Dance That Way (Short Film) 2008 - Writer, Director
- Shoe (Short Film) 2011 - Writer, Director
- The Drummer & the Keeper (Feature Film) 2017 - Writer, Director
- The Song Cycle (Documentary Film) 2026 - Writer, Director, Producer
