= Haiz (EP) =

2015 EP by Hailee Steinfeld

EP by Hailee Steinfeld
- Released: November 13, 2015
- Recorded: 2015–2016
- Genre: Dance-pop
- Length: 14:22
- Label: Republic
- Producers: Mattman & Robin; Oscar Holter; Grey; Zedd

Hailee Steinfeld chronology
Haiz (2015)	Half Written Story (2020)

Singles from Haiz
- 1. "Love Myself" Released: August 7, 2015

Haiz (stylized as HΔIZ and HAIZ) is the debut extended play (EP) by American actress and singer Hailee Steinfeld. It was released on November 13, 2015, by Republic Records. The dance-pop EP was recorded in 2015 and produced by Mattman & Robin and Oscar Holter. The EP was preceded by the lead single, "Love Myself", which reached the top 40 on multiple international singles charts. A remix of "Rock Bottom" featuring the Joe Jonas-fronted DNCE, was also released as a single.

The EP received mixed to positive reviews upon release and achieved modest commercial success in North America. Critics described the record as "fun" and empowering but felt that Steinfeld lacked personality. It debuted at number 38 on the Canadian Albums Chart and number 57 on the US Billboard 200. The EP was released with bonus tracks in Japan, including the single "Starving" (featuring Grey and Zedd), and debuted at number 76 on the Oricon album chart in 2016.

To promote the album, Steinfeld performed at the 2015 and 2016 editions of the Jingle Ball Tour, hosted by iHeartRadio. She also performed as an opening act for fellow American singer Meghan Trainor, specifically on her Untouchable Tour, where she performed with Common Kings. "Starving", a bonus track on the Japanese edition of the EP, was also nominated for a Radio Disney Music Award, alongside Steinfeld herself, in the Best Crush Song and Breakout Artist categories respectively.

== Background and release ==
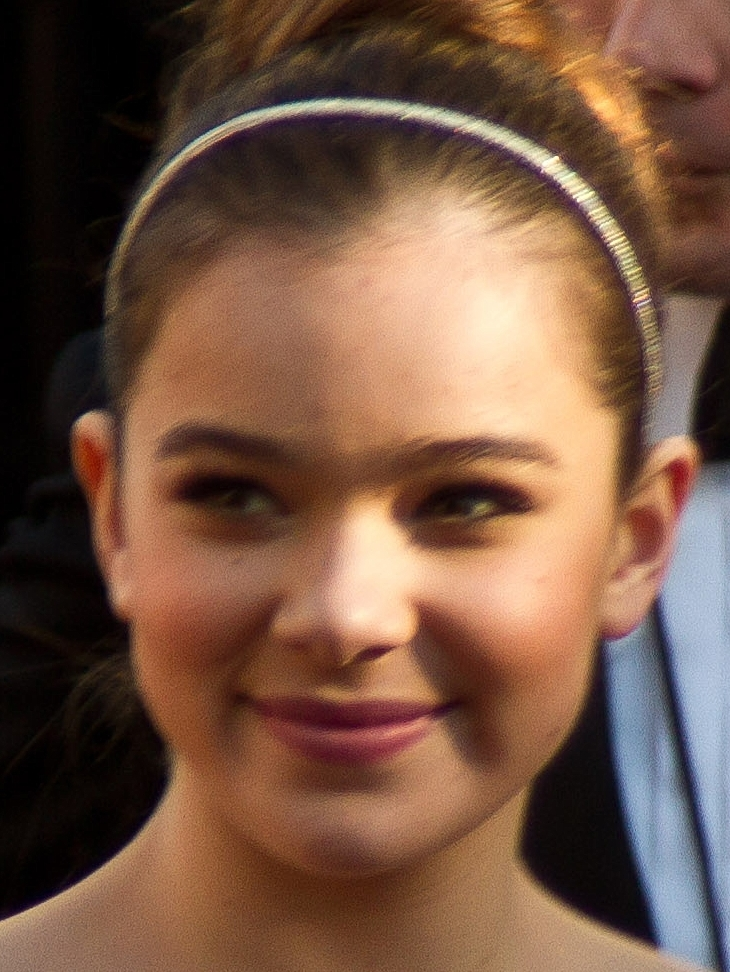
Hailee Steinfeld (pictured at the 2011 Academy Awards) gained notoriety for her cover of Jessie J's "Flashlight", which she performed as "Emily Junk" in the movie Pitch Perfect 2 (2015).

In 2015, Steinfeld starred as Emily Junk in the musical comedy film Pitch Perfect 2, where she debuted her musical aspirations. She also released an acoustic cover of "Flashlight", a song featured in the film and performed by English singer Jessie J on the soundtrack. A week after the film's premiere, Steinfeld announced that she had signed a recording contract with Republic Records and planned to release a single that summer. Mattman & Robin, Captain Cuts, Harvey Mason Jr., and The Futuristics were all named as producers for the forthcoming record; the former duo also co-wrote all four songs that ended up on the extended play. The title and release date for HAIZ were revealed by Billboard on November 2, 2015. It was released on November 13, 2015.

The EP was re-released on February 26, 2016, to add the single version of "Rock Bottom" with the remix featuring DNCE, with this newly recorded version serving as the record's second single. On July 15, 2016, it was re-released a second time to also include the forthcoming single, "Starving". More bonus tracks were added to the Japanese edition of the album, including her breakthrough cover of "Flashlight", a cover of the James Bay-penned "Let It Go", and her feature on the Prince Fox track "Fragile", alongside acoustic versions of "Love Myself" and "Hell Nos and Headphones". The iTunes Store version of the Japanese edition also features a remix of "Love Myself", done by Toy Armanda and DJ Grind.

== Singles ==
"Steinfeld slyly made her ode to masturbation just subliminal enough to fly over a less-involved parent’s head, and its sugary TeenNick-appropriate production probably won’t raise any suspicions either."

— Dee Lockett, writing for Vulture

"Love Myself" was released on August 7, 2015, as the lead single from HAIZ and a forthcoming full-length studio album. The song garnered media attention for its empowering message as well as suggestive lyrics that evoke masturbation. It debuted on the Billboard Pop Songs airplay chart at number 27, marking the highest debut for a solo female artist on the chart since "Torn" entered at number 26 in 1998, and eventually reached a peak position of number 15. It also peaked at number 30 on the Billboard Hot 100 and reached the top 40 on the singles charts in six other countries, including Canada, New Zealand, and Sweden.

In the weeks prior to the EP's release, "Hell Nos and Headphones" was being touted as the collection's second single, but "You're Such A" was selected instead. Neither song was ever released as a single. "Rock Bottom" was ultimately released as the EP's second single on February 26, 2016, as a remix with DNCE, having DNCE's lead singer Joe Jonas record some of the lines originally sung by Steinfeld, and both artists' eventually singing the chorus together. The song "You're Such A" was also released as a promotional single and was certified Gold by Recorded Music New Zealand (RMNZ).

Although it was not included on the original track listing, the single "Starving" (featuring Grey and Zedd) was included on the EP's third digital reissue and its Japanese edition. The single is currently Steinfeld's highest-charting song in the United States as of 2025, peaking at number 12 on the Billboard Hot 100 and number 5 on the Pop Airplay charts, alongside charting within the top 10 in countries such as Australia, Canada, Denmark, New Zealand, and the United Kingdom. It highest peak was a position at number 3 in Scotland. In 2017, the song was nominated for a Radio Disney Music Award in the Best Crush Song category, although it lost to DJ Snake and Justin Bieber's "Let Me Love You".

== Commercial performance ==
Upon its release, the EP charted at number 57 on the Billboard 200 in the United States, and peaked at number 38 on the Canadian Albums Chart. The EP was certified Platinum by the Australian Recording Industry Association (ARIA) and Recording Industry Association Singapore (RIAS) for equivalent sales of 70,000 and 10,000 units respectively. It was also certified Silver by the British Phonographic Industry (BPI) and Gold by Recorded Music New Zealand (RMNZ) for equivalent sales of 60,000 and 7,500 units respectively. The reissue, upon release, charted at number 76 on the Oricon Albums Chart.

== Reissues ==
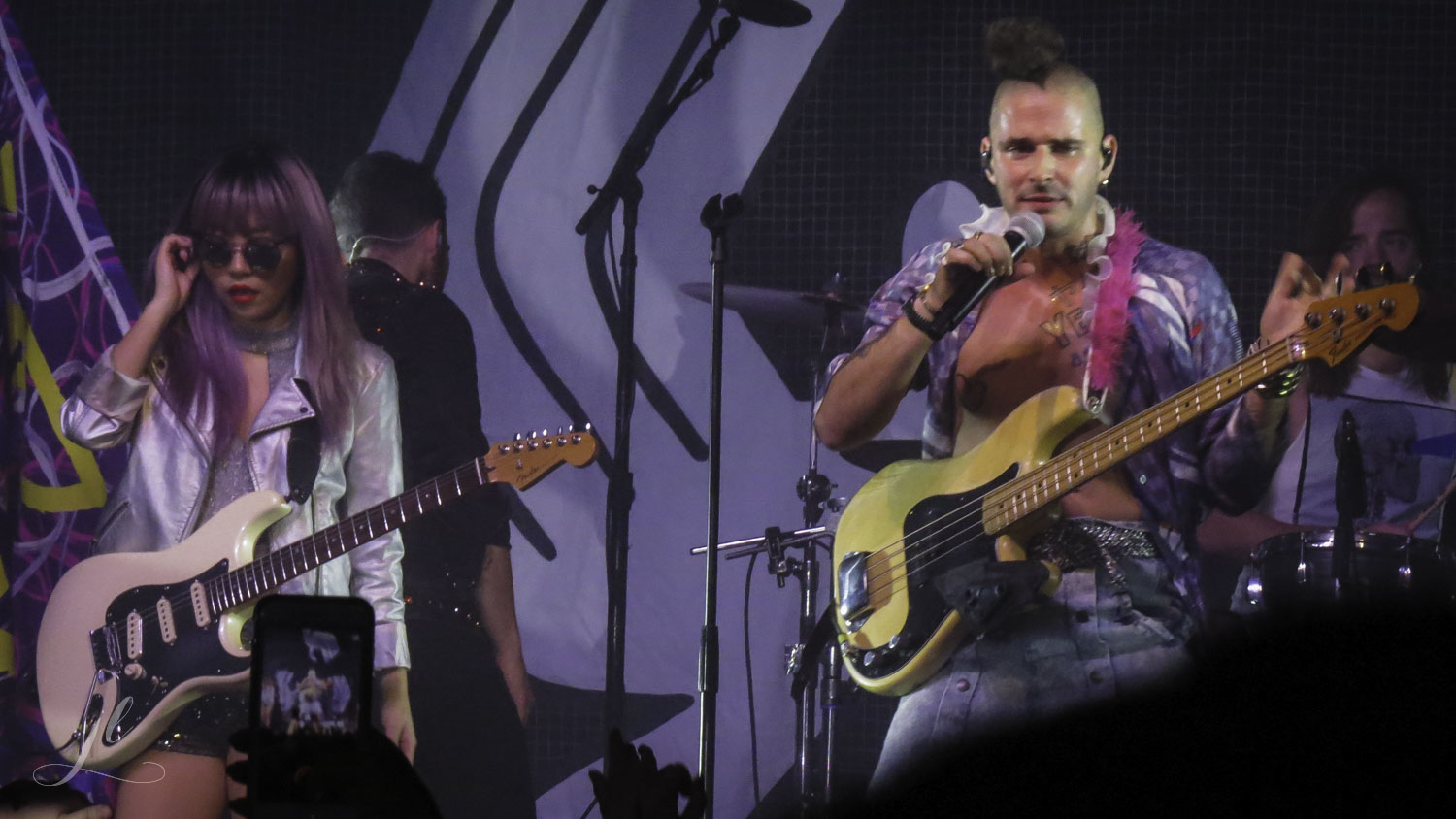
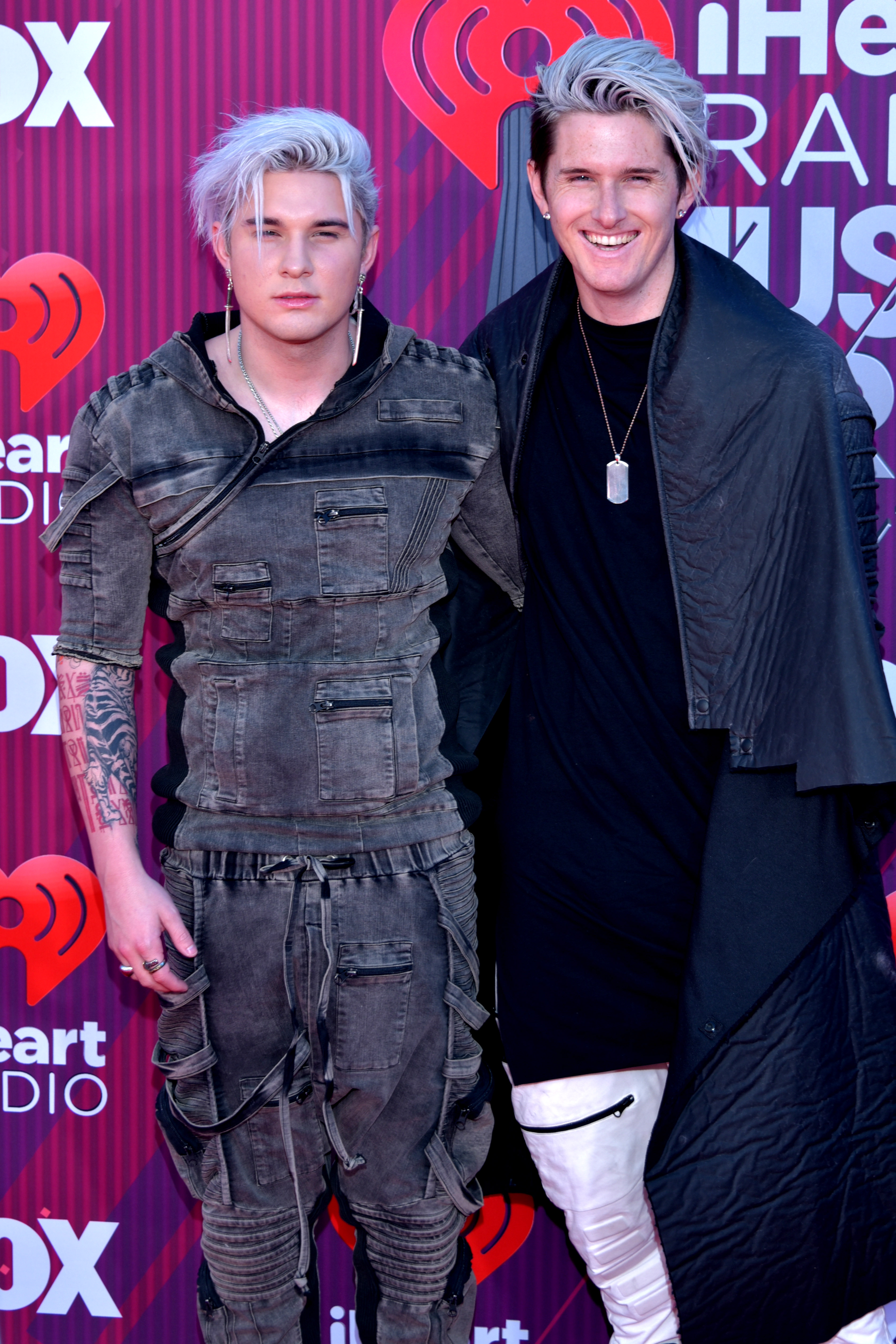
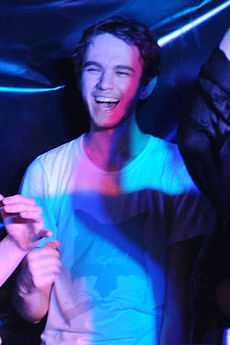
Although there were no features on the original version of the EP, DNCE, Grey, and Zedd made guest appearances on the album's reissues.

After its initial release, the EP was reissued four times. The first digital reissue, released on the 26th of February, doubled as the standard CD release, and replaced the EP version of "Rock Bottom" with the DNCE remix released as a single. The second digital reissue, released on the 15th of July, added the original version of "Rock Bottom" as a bonus track and the last track of the EP. The third digital reissue added the song "Starving", giving the song's features, Grey and Zedd, production credits on the EP. The reissue also moves the original version of "Rock Bottom" to take place before the DNCE remix.

On the 19th of August, 2016, the fourth reissue was release in Japan. The reissue adds five bonus tracks to an alternate version of the third digital reissue's track listing, which moves the original version of "Rock Bottom" to the end of the track listing, similar to the second digital reissue. The bonus tracks include a cover of James Bay's "Let It Go", acoustic versions of "Love Myself" and "Hell Nos and Headphones", the Prince Fox track "Fragile", which features Steinfeld, and her breakthrough song, a cover of Jessie J's "Flashlight", named "Flashlight (Sweet Life Mix)". The iTunes Store version of this reissue features a remix of "Love Myself" as a bonus track, curated by Toy Armanda and DJ Grind.

== Track listing ==
2015 digital release
No.	Title	Writer(s)	Producer(s)	Length
1.	"Love Myself"	Mattias Larsson; Robin Fredriksson; Oscar Holter; Julia Michaels; Justin Tranter	Mattman & Robin; Oscar Holter	3:38
2.	"You're Such A"	Larsson; Fredriksson; Michaels; Tranter	Mattman & Robin	3:36
3.	"Rock Bottom"	Larsson; Fredriksson; Michaels; Tranter	Mattman & Robin	3:18
4.	"Hell Nos and Headphones"	Larsson; Fredriksson; Michaels; Tranter	Mattman & Robin	3:50
Total length:				14:22

First digital reissue and standard CD release
No.	Title	Writer(s)	Producer(s)	Length
1.	"Love Myself"	Larsson; Fredriksson; Holter; Michaels; Tranter	Mattman & Robin; Oscar Holter	3:38
2.	"You're Such A"	Larsson; Fredriksson; Michaels; Tranter	Mattman & Robin	3:36
3.	"Rock Bottom" (featuring DNCE)	Larsson; Fredriksson; Michaels; Tranter	Mattman & Robin	3:18
4.	"Hell Nos and Headphones"	Larsson; Fredriksson; Michaels; Tranter	Mattman & Robin	3:50

Second digital reissue
No.	Title	Writer(s)	Producer(s)	Length
5.	"Rock Bottom"	Larsson; Fredriksson; Michaels; Tranter	Mattman & Robin	3:18
Total length:				17:40

Third digital reissue
No.	Title	Writer(s)	Producer(s)	Length
1.	"Love Myself"	Larsson; Fredriksson; Holter; Michaels; Tranter	Mattman & Robin; Oscar Holter	3:38
2.	"You're Such A"	Larsson; Fredriksson; Michaels; Tranter	Mattman & Robin	3:36
3.	"Rock Bottom"	Larsson; Fredriksson; Michaels; Tranter	Mattman & Robin	3:18
4.	"Rock Bottom" (featuring DNCE)	Larsson; Fredriksson; Michaels; Tranter	Mattman & Robin	3:18
5.	"Hell Nos and Headphones"	Larsson; Fredriksson; Michaels; Tranter	Mattman & Robin	3:50
6.	"Starving" (with Grey featuring Zedd)	Michael Trewartha; Kyle Trewartha; Robert McCurdy; Christopher Petrosino; Asia Whiteacre	Grey; Zedd	3:01
Total length:				20:41

Japanese edition
No.	Title	Writer(s)	Producer(s)	Length
1.	"Love Myself"	Larsson; Fredriksson; Holter; Michaels; Tranter; Steinfeld	Mattman & Robin; Oscar Holter	3:38
2.	"You're Such A"	Larsson; Fredriksson; Michaels; Tranter	Mattman & Robin	3:36
3.	"Rock Bottom" (featuring DNCE)	Larsson; Fredriksson; Michaels; Tranter	Mattman & Robin	3:18
4.	"Hell Nos and Headphones"	Larsson; Fredriksson; Michaels; Tranter	Mattman & Robin	3:50
5.	"Starving" (with Grey featuring Zedd)	M. Trewartha; K. Trewartha; McCurdy; Petrosino; Whiteacre	Grey; Zedd	3:01
6.	"Rock Bottom"	Larsson; Fredriksson; Michaels; Tranter	Mattman & Robin	3:18
7.	"Let It Go"	James Bay; Paul Barry		3:59
8.	"Love Myself (Acoustic)"	Larsson; Fredriksson; Holter; Michaels; Tranter; Steinfeld		2:42
9.	"Hell Nos and Headphones (Acoustic)"	Larsson; Fredriksson; Michaels; Tranter		2:47
10.	"Fragile" (Prince Fox featuring Hailee Steinfeld)	Jordan Palmer; Aaron Jennings; Sam Lassner; Jordan Humphries		3:36
11.	"Flashlight (Sweet Life Mix)"	Sia Furler; Christian Guzman; Jason Moore; Sam Smith		2:58
Total length:				33:19

Japanese iTunes Store edition
No.	Title	Writer(s)	Producer(s)	Length
12.	"Love Myself (Toy Armada & DJ Grind Club Mix)"	Larsson; Fredriksson; Holter; Michaels; Tranter; Steinfeld	Mattman & Robin; Oscar Holter	6:11
Total length:				39:30

== Charts ==
Chart (2015–2016)	Peak position
Canadian Albums (Billboard)	38
Japanese Albums (Oricon)	76
US Billboard 200	57

== Certifications ==
Region	Certification	Certified units/sales
Australia (ARIA)	Platinum	70,000^{‡}
New Zealand (RMNZ)	Gold	7,500^{‡}
Singapore (RIAS)	Platinum	10,000^{*}
United Kingdom (BPI)	Silver	60,000^{‡}
^{*} Sales figures based on certification alone.^{‡} Sales+streaming figures based on certification alone.

== Release history ==
Country	Date	Format	Label	Ref.
Worldwide	November 13, 2015	Digital download; streaming	Republic	
Worldwide	February 26, 2016 (1st reissue)	Digital download; streaming	Republic	
Worldwide	July 15, 2016 (2nd reissue)	Digital download; streaming	Republic	
Philippines	April 8, 2016	CD	Republic	
Japan	August 19, 2016	CD; digital download; streaming	Republic	
