= The Drummer & the Keeper =

2017 Irish film

- Theatrical film poster
- Directed by: Nick Kelly
- Written by: Nick Kelly
- Produced by: Kate McColgan
- Starring: Dermot Murphy; Jacob McCarthy; Peter Coonan; Charlie Kelly; Aoibhinn McGinnity; Olwen Fouéré
- Cinematography: Tom Comerford
- Edited by: Derek Holland
- Music by: John Gerard Walsh
- Release dates: July 14, 2017 (Galway); September 8, 2017 (Ireland)
- Running time: 94 mins.
- Country: Ireland
- Language: English

The Drummer & the Keeper is a 2017 Irish dramedy film, written and directed by Nick Kelly in his feature film debut. It stars Dermot Murphy, Jacob McCarthy, Phelim Drew, Adrian Hudson, Aoibhinn McGinnity, Charlie Kelly, Olwen Fouéré, Ally Ni Chiarain, Peter Coonan, and Niamh Algar. It premiered at the 2017 Galway Film Fleadh, before being released theatrically two months later throughout Ireland.

== Plot ==
Tells the story of the unlikely friendship formed between two young men: Gabriel, a reckless young drummer with Bipolar Disorder, who revels in rejecting society's rules; and Christopher, a 17-year-old with Asperger Syndrome, who yearns to fit in. This heartwarming story shows the strength of the human bond in the face of adversity.

== Cast ==
- Dermot Murphy as Gabriel
- Jacob McCarthy as Christopher
- Adrian Hudson as Eric
- Niamh Algar as Ingrid
- Aoibhinn McGinnity as Alice
- Charlie Kelly as Pearse
- Peter Coonan as Toss
- Phelim Drew as Jeremy
- Ally Ni Chiarain as Naomi
- Olwen Fouéré as Dr. Assif
- Dylan Tighe as Dr. Geary
- Annie Ryan as Dr. Flahavan

== Reception ==
On the review aggregator website Rotten Tomatoes, 71% of 7 critics' reviews are positive, with an average rating of 6.00/10.

Brian Ó Tiomáin of Film Ireland lauded writer/director Nick Kelly for his extensive research on mental illness and neurodivergence, stating the film "heralds the arrival of a very impressive new talent". Roddy Flynn of Estudios Irlandeses praises the performances of the young leads, as well as applauding Kelly's "knack for the arresting visual image". Donald Clarke of The Irish Times gave the film 3/5 stars, calling it "airy, funny, optimistic, and honest".

Fionnuala Halligan of Screen Daily also lauded the film, stating "Kelly is fearless in the way he tackles mental illness and his command of comic tone is strong". Roe McDermott of Hot Press called the film "beautiful yet funny, quirky but dark".

Contrastly, Chloe Victory of HeadStuff, who identifies as autistic, criticizes some of what she calls "stereotypical portrayals" of Asperger Syndrome. Alan Zilberman of Washington City Paper chastised the film because it "opts for a contrived happy ending".
