= A Lazarus Soul =

Irish band

- Origin: Dublin, Ireland
- Genres: Post-punk, indie rock, Irish folk
- Years active: 2001–present
- Labels: Bohemia Records, Absent Music, FIFA Records
- Members: Brian Brannigan; Anton Hegarty; Joe Chester; Julie Bienvenu
- Past members: Fin O'Leary; Bryan McMahon; Joey Wilson
- Website: adotldots.com

A Lazarus Soul is an Irish post-punk band formed in Dublin in 2001. The band is known for its focus on social issues in Ireland. Its name derives from the nickname "Lazarus" given to lead singer Brian Brannigan by his mother due to him overcoming multiple severe illnesses in childhood. The group began as Brannigan's musical project and later became a band with a stable lineup.

== History ==
A Lazarus Soul formed in 2001 in Dublin as a project of singer Brian Brannigan. Brannigan had performed in well-known bands in the indie scene since the 1990s. Other early members of the project's changing lineup already had established musical careers, and early on the band was cited as an "indie supergroup". Bassist Anton Hegarty was known from the band Future Kings of Spain, as were former members Bryan McMahon and Joey Wilson, while former member Fin O'Leary had been in Mexican Pets. Joe Chester was the band's producer from its inception, and had worked with various popular bands from 1990 as a producer, then from 1994 on stage, before beginning a solo career. The group’s early releases include ALSrecord (2001) and Through a Window in the Sunshine Room (2011).

Chester joined the stage lineup in 2012 or 2013, along with drummer Julie Bienvenu who had played in smaller bands including Lines Drawing Circles. The new solidified lineup worked together on their album released in 2014. Their fifth album, No Flowers Grow in Cement Gardens, was released in 2024 after a five year pause. The band, now with members living in both France and Ireland, convened in France to record the album.

== Releases ==
- a lazarus soul record (also styled ALSrecord or alazarussoulrecord) (EP, 2001)
- Graveyard of Burnt Out Cars (2007)
- Through a Window in the Sunshine Room (2011)
- Last of the Analogue Age (2014)
- The D They Put Between the R & L (2019)
- No Flowers Grow in Cement Gardens (2024) – featuring Steve Wickham on violin

== Style and themes ==
The music of A Lazarus Soul combines elements of alternative rock, post-punk, Irish folk, electronic pop, and indie rock. Brannigan's lyrics frequently address themes of working-class life, Dublin’s urban landscape, and socio-political issues in Ireland. In interviews, Brannigan has stated that the band aims to document aspects of Irish life. The band is often described as a folk band, though Brannigan rejects this label, despite seeing himself as singing in the ballad tradition.

== Reception ==
A Lazarus Soul has been generally well received by critics and Irish music publications. The D They Put Between the R & L (2019) was described by The Irish Times as a "low-key but frequently powerful piece of work". The 2024 release No Flowers Grow in Cement Gardens has been praised for its lyrical depth, with Irish Independent stating that it "will snare any listener" through its poetic handling of social themes.

They were included in The Sunday Times’ 101 Irish Albums We Love in 2017.

The band's work has been acknowledged by Irish folk musician Christy Moore who recorded two of their songs on his 2024 album, A Terrible Beauty.
