= Seán Millar =

Musical Artist and Theatre Maker

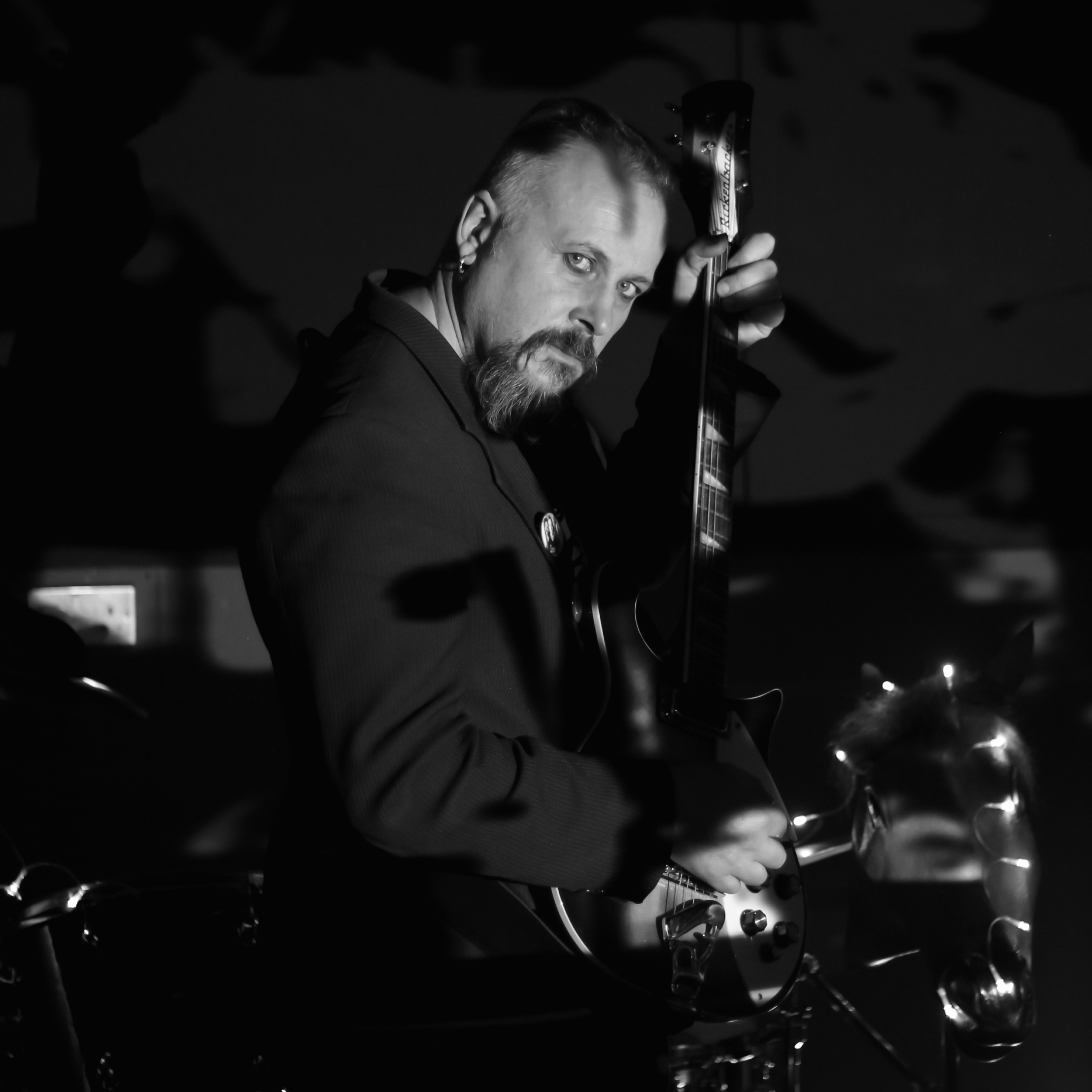
- Seán Millar

Background information
- Also known as: Doctor Millar
- Origin: Dublin, Ireland
- Genres: Alternative; Roots; Americana; Folk; Acoustic
- Occupations: Musician, Singer-Songwriter, Theatre Director
- Years active: 1988–present
- Member of: The Cute Hoors
- Website: doctormillar.com

Seán Millar (also known as Doctor Millar) is a musician and theatre maker from Dublin. He has been a recording and performing music artist since 1988 both as a solo artist and with his band The Cute Hoors. He also creates & composes music based theatre performances and is an artist/facilitator in community based creative, music and education programs.

== Recording and performing artist ==
Seán's music career began in 1988 as the lead singer and main songwriter in Doctor Millar and The Cute Hoors.

From the late 1980s and into the early 1990s, Doctor Millar & The Cute Hoors toured extensively around Ireland, the UK and mainland Europe and played at several British festivals including the Reading & Leeds festival and The Fleadh in Finsbury Park. They received generally positive reviews and were Time Out magazine's recommended gig of the month twice (once notably ahead of both David Byrne and Morrissey). They released their only album Gig in 1990. The Cute Hoors split in 1992 and Seán began his career as solo singer/songwriter and recording artist.

In 1995 Seán released his first solo album The Bitter Lie (as his alter ego Doctor Millar). The album was produced by Tymon Dogg (The Clash). The album was voted one of the Best Irish Albums of all time by Today FM and The Sunday Tribune. Seán was also nominated for the solo performer of the year award at the Heineken Hot Press Awards in 1995 (other notable nominees in this category were Van Morrison, Paul Brady and Gavin Friday).

Seán released his second solo album The Deal in 1998. The Sunday Times named the album as one of the top five albums of the year. In 2011, The Deal was included in the book 101 Irish Records You Must Hear Before You Die by Tony Clayton Lea.

In 2002, Seán released Always Coming Home under the name Doctor Millar and The Beat Club. The album received critical praise. "Millar retains his own distinctive edge throughout, ensuring he can experiment with pop, folk and country styles yet keep a singular thread weaving through the album." - Hot Press magazine

Seán's fourth album Of The People was released in 2010. The album was initially released in two parts named "Of The People Part 1" and "Of The People Part 2". Both parts have since been combined to form the complete album.

2013 saw the release of Seán's fifth album C48 (released under his alias Doctor Millar). The album received many positive reviews. It was chosen as "Best Album of 2013" in the RTÉ Arena Critic's end of year round-ups. C48 was produced by Joe Chester who Seán has worked with extensively over the years. Joe also produced The Deal and Always Coming Home.

Seán reunited with his band The Cute Hoors in 2017 to record & release the album Hair Like Blood. Olaf Tyaransen of Hot Press described the album as an "excellent effort from veteran Irish rockers".

In 2018 Seán released the EP "It All Ends Tonight" with the American musician Jon Sanchez.

Seán joined forces with musicians Nick Kelly (The Fat Lady Sings), Paul Byrne (In Tua Nua), Les Keye and Darragh O' Toole to form The Unelectables in 2018. The bands manifesto was "to make noise beautiful again". They have released one single to date called Hairtrigger. The Irish Times named The Unelectables as the "best-dressed performers (male)" at the 2018 Electric Picnic.

Seán has also been releasing music as part of his collaborative project All is Leaf. In 2019, he released a Christmas song called "December Man". The track "Sci-Fi Boy" was released in 2020 and featured Martin McCann (SACK) and Miriam Ingram. The artist Francis Fay made the visual accompaniment for the track "Sci-Fi Boy".

Seán released his latest album Ruining Everything in 2022 through Gentleman Recordings. Tony Clayton Lea of the Irish Times described the album as "a feast of Americana" and "a set of warm, confident songs". The lead single "Look What She Threw Away" features Dónal Lunny. The second single from the album "Communion Money" was released on 30 September.

Notably in 2022, the musician Paolo Nutini chose Seán's track These Days (from his album The Bitter Lie) as "The track that changed my life" in the Hot Press 45th anniversary special.

Dogs is a new project with long-time friend, the musician Nick Kelly (The Fat Lady Sings). It all began when they spent a week dog-sitting in West Clare where they were inspired to write some new songs. They later recorded & released four of these songs on their debut EP Tricks. Dogs began their sustainable tour called The Song Cycle in June 2022. The Song Cycle involved Nick cycling from Dublin to Glastonbury Festival and Seán travelling by bus. The tour started in Dublin at Whelans and included gigs at Carmarthen, Swansea, Cardiff, Bristol and ending with two gigs at Glastonbury Festival.

In late 2024 Seán and Nick Kelly released the debut Dogs album Joy. It was released on the indie label Last Night From Glasgow and it entered the Scottish charts at number 12.

== Theatre writer and composer ==
=== Writer ===
Seán was the writer & composer of Silver Stars, which was produced by the Brokentalkers theatre company as part of the Dublin Theatre Festival 2009. The show went on to tour internationally. The project was revived in 2017 when Seán and the cast of "Silver Stars" performed The Songs from Silver Stars.

In 2012 Seán wrote, directed & composed the music for "The Last Ten Years". It was made with the participants of RADE (Recovery through Art, Drama, Education) and it was performed at St Patrick's Cathedral as part of the Absolute Fringe Festival 2012.

Songs of Grievance and Hope was a 2014 project Seán created and commissioned The Spectacle of Defiance and Hope.

Seán was the musical director on the Veronica Dyas play My Son, My Son which was performed at the Mermaid Arts Centre, Dublin in 2018.

In 2018 Seán was the composer, co-writer & co-director of Shame with Pom Boyd. It was performed at the Abbey Theatre in Dublin. It was nominated for three awards in the Dublin Fringe Festival 2018.

Love Song Part 1: Communities of Dissent - Silver Stars and Beyond was staged in the Abbey Theatre in 2022. The show was a curated song cycle through Seán's songs from his many community based projects and the performance included many of the original cast members. Love Song Part 2 is scheduled for the Beáltine Festival 2023.

=== Composer ===
The music for The Blue Boy (by Brokentalkers theatre company) was composed by Seán in 2011. The play toured internationally & was the winner of the Grand Prix Award at the 2011 Kontakt InternatIonal Theatre Festival in Poland.

Other theatre projects that Seán has composed the music for include History by Grace Dyas, Frequency 783, Circus Animal Desertion and the Neil Watkins play Dinner and a Show.

== Community based projects ==
For over 20 years, Seán has worked extensively across a wide range of communities in Dublin, both making pieces for performance around specific issues, and helping to create ongoing music programs, some of which continue to run today.

The Monument Song was written and performed by young adults from NCCCAP about the heroin epidemic in the North inner city. It was performed by the writers at the launching of the monument on Sean McDermott St.

For Tower Songs, Seán was part of the artist team working with communities on a creative response to regeneration. These pieces were made collaboratively and performed sometimes in the tower blocks themselves by residents of Fatima Mansions, Ballymun and Dolphin House, with a string section, shortly before their demolition.

The Last Ten Years was a song cycle written with recovering addicts from RADE recovery program about the pharmaceutical industry. It was performed in St Patrick's Cathedral as part of Dublin Fringe Festival 2012. It was nominated for two Fringe awards.

Songs of Grievance and Hope was another song cycle for theatre, and commissioned by the Spectacle of Defiance and Hope in 2013. It was made with community projects across the city about the effects of austerity on service users. Performed by a cast of community activists in the Project Arts Centre, Dublin.

Sometimes the Signal Jumps was a performance piece made with the residents of Bluebell housing estate (The Bluebell Project) over a period of two years and performed live at the National Concert Hall with the National Symphony Orchestra.

== Other credits and projects ==
Seán starred as The Bank Manager in the 2007 film Once (film).

He co-produced Nick Kelly's (formerly of The Fat Lady Sings) album Running Dog.

The Kevin Gildeas is a dark musical comedy outfit which Seán co-founded with Kevin Gildea.

== Personal life ==
Seán lives in Dublin with his wife, the actress and comedienne Pom Boyd. They have two children together, Faith and Carlo. Their daughter, Faith Boyd-Millar is the musician Cruelsister.

== Discography ==
=== Albums ===
- Gig (Doctor Millar & The Cute Hoors) - 1990
- The Bitter Lie (Doctor Millar) - 1995
- The Deal (Doctor Millar) - 1998
- Always Coming Home (Doctor Millar &The Beet Club) - 2002
- Of The People (Parts 1 and 2) - 2010
- C48 - 2013
- Ruining Everything (Doctor Millar) - 2022
- Joy (Dogs) - 2024

=== EP releases ===
- Call Me Dirt - EP (Doctor Millar & The Cute Hoors) - 1989
- Alcohol Problem - EP (Doctor Millar) - 1994
- Love Girl - EP (Doctor Millar & The Beet Club) - 2003
- Of The People (Part 1) - 2009
- Of The People (Part 2) - 2009
- It All Ends Tonight (Seán Millar & Jon Sanchez) - 2018
- Tricks (Dogs) - 2021
- Look What She Threw Away - 2021
