= Peace Together =

Compilation album by Peace Together
- Released: 1993
- Label: Polygram Records

Professional ratings
Review scores
Source	Rating
Allmusic	link
Select	4/5 stars

Peace Together was a 20 July 1993 fundraiser compilation album released by the Peace Together organisation, dedicated to promoting peace in Northern Ireland, which was initiated by Robert Hamilton, of The Fat Lady Sings, and Ali McMordie of Stiff Little Fingers. Sasha King and Lisa Johnson also joined the Peace Together team at the inception.

Tracks 1 and 13 feature contributions from Peter Gabriel, Sinéad O'Connor, Feargal Sharkey, Nanci Griffith, Jah Wobble, Clive Langer, and members of the Hothouse Flowers.

The track "Be Still" was released as a single to promote the album, it is a cover version of a song by The Fat Lady Sings from their debut album Twist. The song was written by Nick Kelly who also plays acoustic guitar on the track.

== Tracks ==
1. "Be Still" – 3:52
2. "What a Waste!" - Curve, Ian Dury – 5:01
3. "Games Without Frontiers" - Pop Will Eat Itself – 5:23
4. "Satellite of Love" - U2 – 3:51
5. "Invisible Sun" - Therapy? – 3:15
6. "Peace in Our Time" - Carter the Unstoppable Sex Machine – 3:49
7. "Religious Persuasion" - Billy Bragg, Sinéad O'Connor, Andy White – 5:40
8. "We Have All the Time in the World" - My Bloody Valentine – 3:15
9. "Bad Weather" - Young Disciples – 4:34
10. "John the Gun" - The Fatima Mansions – 4:26
11. "Oliver's Army" - Blur – 3:09
12. "When We Were Two Little Boys" - Rolf Harris, Liam Ó Maonlaí – 4:57
13. "Be Still" (Remix Featuring Elizabeth Fraser) – 3:52

== Personnel ==
- Andy Baker – Engineer
- Leo Barnes – Saxophone
- Ben Blakeman – Guitar
- Blur – Producer
- Dave Burnham – Engineer
- Fiach Cooling – Assistant Engineer
- Ruadhri Cushnan – Engineer
- Pete Davis – Drum Programming
- Demus – Programming, Engineer, Mixing
- Sean Devitt – Engineer
- Tim Dorney – Keyboards
- Fatima Mansions – Producer
- Guy Fixsen – Engineer
- Claudia Fontaine – Vocals (background)
- The Frames – Choir, Chorus
- Elizabeth Fraser – Vocals
- Peter Gabriel – Vocals, Engineer
- Robin Guthrie – Remixing
- Matt Howe – Assistant Engineer
- Kevin Jacobs – Engineer
- Luis Jadim – Percussion
- Pete Jones – Engineer, Assistant Engineer
- Clive Langer – Guitar (Electric), Producer
- Nick Kelly - Acoustic Guitar (Be Still)
- Jon Mallison – Producer, Engineer
- Steve Marker – Producer
- Spencer May – Engineer
- Paul Mortimer – Engineer
- My Bloody Valentine – Engineer, Performer
- Sinéad O'Connor – Vocals
- Liam Ó Maonlaí – Vocals (background), Whistle (Human), Performer, Bodhran
- Steve Osborne – Producer, Engineer
- Andrew Paresi – Drum Programming
- John Reynolds – Drums
- Feargal Sharkey – Vocals
- Chris Sheldon – Producer, Engineer
- Kevin Shields – Producer
- John Smith – Producer, Engineer
- Danton Supple – Engineer
- Therapy? – Producer
- Simon Vinestock – Engineer
- Jah Wobble – Bass
- Young Disciples – Producer, Mixing
