= A Terrible Beauty (Christy Moore album) =

Studio album by Christy Moore
- Released: 2024
- Genre: Folk
- Label: Claddagh Records

Christy Moore chronology
Flying into Mystery (2021)	A Terrible Beauty (2024)

A Terrible Beauty is a studio album by Irish folk singer Christy Moore, released in 2024 by Claddagh Records. The album is dedicated to the Irish journalist Tommie Gorman and to music promoter Vince Power.

The video for the first track "Boy in the Wild" was directed and produced by Ellius Grace, and stars the Irish actor Liam Cunningham as the father, and the IFTA-nominated young actor Ollie West as his son.

== Critical reception ==
Professional ratings
Aggregate scores
Source	Rating
Metacritic	84/100
Review scores
Source	Rating
The Observer	4/5 stars

A Terrible Beauty was met with "universal acclaim" reviews from critics. At Metacritic, which assigns a weighted average rating out of 100 to reviews from mainstream publications, this release received an average score of 84, based on 4 reviews.

== Track listing ==
No.	Title	Lyrics	Length
1.	"Boy in the Wild"	Christy Moore; Wally Page	2:54
2.	"Sunflower"	Mike Harding	1:45
3.	"Black & Amber"	Briany Brannigan	2:26
4.	"Lemon Sevens"	Briany Brannigan	3:44
5.	"Broomielaw"	Moore	3:45
6.	"Cumann na Mná"	Moore; Mick Blake	2:43
7.	"The Rock"	Moore; Cathal Hayden	1:33
8.	"The Life and Soul"	Moore	2:03
9.	"Lyra McKee"	James Cramer	2:37
10.	"Darkness Before Dawn"	Pete Kavanagh	2:47
11.	"The Big Marquee"	Moore	3:36
12.	"Palestine"	Jim Page	2:54
13.	"Snowflakes"	Martin Leahy	1:48

== Charts ==
Chart performance for A Terrible Beauty
Chart (2024)	Peak position
Irish Albums (Official Charts)	1
Scottish Albums (Official Charts)	21
UK Album Downloads (Official Charts)	30
UK Folk Albums (Official Charts)	4
