= Rock Bottom (Hailee Steinfeld song) =

2016 single by Hailee Steinfeld featuring DNCE

Song by Hailee Steinfeld

from the EP Haiz
- Released: November 13, 2015
- Recorded: 2015
- Genre: Pop
- Length: 3:18
- Label: Republic
- Songwriters: Mattias Larsson; Robin Fredriksson; Julia Michaels; Justin Tranter
- Producer: Mattman & Robin

"Rock Bottom"

Single by Hailee Steinfeld featuring DNCE

from the EP Haiz (reissues)
- Released: February 26, 2016
- Genre: Pop
- Length: 3:18
- Label: Republic; Universal
- Songwriters: Mattias Larsson; Robin Fredriksson; Justin Tranter; Julia Michaels
- Producer: Mattman & Robin

Hailee Steinfeld singles chronology
"Love Myself" (2015)	"Rock Bottom" (2016)	"Starving" (2016)

DNCE singles chronology
"Cake by the Ocean" (2015)	"Rock Bottom" (2016)	"Toothbrush" (2016)

Music video
- "Rock Bottom" on YouTube

"Rock Bottom" is a song by American actress and singer Hailee Steinfeld, released as the third track to her debut extended play, Haiz (2015), through Republic Records. The song, a pop record, was written by fellow American singers Justin Tranter and Julia Michaels, alongside the song's producers, Mattman & Robin. The song was originally released as the third track to the EP on the 13th of November, 2015. Upon the release of Haiz, the song was received positively by music critics, who praised the track for its upbeat sound.

On the 26th of November, 2016, a remix featuring the Joe Jonas-fronted group DNCE was released as a single through both Republic and Universal Records. It would later be included on reissues of the EP, including its Japanese edition. Upon its release, the song was a modest success, peaking within the top 10 of both the New Zealand Heatseekers Chart and the Billboard Bubbling Under Hot 100 chart, charting at number 3 on both charts. The song was also certified Platinum by the Recording Industry Association of America (RIAA). A music video would later be released of the song, directed by Malia James.

== Background ==
In an interview with People's Jeff Nelson, Steinfeld said "[Rock Bottom] epitomizes me in every damn relationship. I've experienced that relationship in its entirety. I do feel like there are some songs that really represent a relationship for a relationship, and then when you hear it, you think about that specific relationship, and I have that when I hear 'Rock Bottom'."

The DNCE remix of the song was not the last time Steinfeld collaborated with the group, as, on the 16th of December, 2016, she would feature on their cover of "Santa Claus Is Comin' to Town", alongside fellow American singers Charlie Puth, Daya, Fifth Harmony, Tinashe, Sabrina Carpenter, and Jake Miller, and British singer Rita Ora. The cover was released as a promotional single for the 2016 IHeartRadio Jingle Ball, which she performed at.

She would later cover the group's signature hit, "Cake by the Ocean" in 2017 as "Emily Junk", for the movie Pitch Perfect 3 (2017), as a part of the fictional group "The Bellas". It was later included on the album's soundtrack, released on the 15th of December, 2017. The movie itself was released on the 30th of November that same year.

== Release ==
The original version of "Rock Bottom" was released on the 13th of November, 2015, as the third track to Steinfeld's debut extended play (EP), Haiz. In the weeks prior to Haiz's release, "Hell Nos and Headphones" was being touted as the EP's second single, but "You're Such A" was chosen instead, and was set to impact Top 40 radio on February 9, 2016. However, the release of "You're Such A" was scrapped in favor of the new version of "Rock Bottom" featuring DNCE.

On the EP's first digital reissue (which doubled as the standard CD release), the original version of the song was replaced by the DNCE remix. On the second digital reissue, the original version was added back into the track listing, although it was placed at the end of the project. On the third digital reissue, the song was moved to be the third track, with the DNCE remix following right afterwards. On the Japanese edition, the original version of the song was positioned to be the sixth track, following right after "Starving".

== Critical reception ==
Access Hollywood deemed the song "a stylistic, upbeat jam full of swagger and soul." Jeff Nelson of People said "a poppy, effervescent jam, 'Rock Bottom' chronicles the highs and lows of young love that keep a couple 'coming back for more'." Mike Wass of Idolator called "Rock Bottom" "the best song on the EP."

== Commercial performance ==
=== United States of America ===
Upon its release, the single was less successful than its predecessor, "Love Myself", but would still debut at number 33 on the Billboard Pop Airplay chart and peaked at number 3 on the Billboard Bubbling Under Hot 100 Singles chart, both based in the United States of America. It was also certified Platinum by the Recording Industry Association of America (RIAA) for equivalent sales of 1,000,000 units in the United States.

=== Internationally ===
In Australia, the single peaked at number 39 on the ARIA Charts. Although the song did not chart in Brazil, it was still certified Gold by Pro-Música Brasil (PMB) for equivalent sales of 30,000 units in the country. In Canada, the single charted at number 39 on the Canadian Hot 100, its lowest position on any chart, and peaked at number 47 on the Hot AC chart in the same country. The single was also certified Gold by Music Canada (MC) for equivalent sales of 40,000 units in the country.

In the Czech Republic, the single charted at number 46 on the Singles Digital Top 100. In New Zealand, the single charted at number 3 on the New Zealand Heatseekers chart and was certified Platinum by Recorded Music New Zealand (RMNZ) for equivalent sales of 30,000 units in the country. In Slovakia, the single charted at number 50 on their version of the Singles Digital Top 100. In the United Kingdom, although the song did not chart, it was certified Silver by the British Phonographic Industry (BPI) for equivalent sales of 200,000 units in the country.

== Music video ==
=== Original version ===
The original version of the song had an animated music video. The video, directed by Breech Harani, features a relationship between a couple of paper-made individuals and their trials and tribulations through life. The video was released on the 5th of February, 2016, as part of a series of animated music videos for the songs on Haiz, and currently has over 850,000 views and 25,000 likes as of September 11, 2025.

=== Remix ===
The music video for the remix, directed by Malia James, was released on March 25, 2016. Rolling Stone's Brittany Spanos described the music video: "In the clip, Steinfeld struggles with a tumultuous relationship. The singer and her boyfriend, played by model John Economou, shift dramatically between fighting and joking around, which culminates at a show Steinfeld performs at with DNCE. Economou walks out during the performance, and a distraught Steinfeld leaves to find him, where they kiss and make up." The music video currently has over 170,000,000 views and 1,200,000 likes as of September 11, 2025.

== Credits and personnel ==
Credits have been obtained from AllMusic.

- Hailee Steinfeld - vocals/songwriter
- Joe Jonas - vocals/songwriter
- Mattias Larsson – songwriter
- Robin Fredriksson – songwriter
- Julia Michaels – songwriter
- Justin Tranter – songwriter
- Mattman & Robin – producer
- JinJoo Lee - guitar
- Cole Whittle - bass
- Jack Lawless - drums
- John Hanes – assistant recording engineer
- John Cranfield – assistant recording engineer
- Serban Ghenea – mixer
- Randy Merrill – mastering engineer

== Charts ==
Chart (2016)	Peak position
Australia (ARIA)	39
Canada Hot 100 (Billboard)	61
Canada Hot AC (Billboard)	47
Czech Republic Singles Digital (ČNS IFPI)	46
New Zealand Heatseeker Singles (Recorded Music NZ)	3
Slovakia Singles Digital (ČNS IFPI)	50
US Bubbling Under Hot 100 (Billboard)	3
US Pop Airplay (Billboard)	33

== Certifications ==
Region	Certification	Certified units/sales
Brazil (Pro-Música Brasil)	Gold	30,000^{‡}
Canada (Music Canada)	Gold	40,000^{‡}
New Zealand (RMNZ)	Platinum	30,000^{‡}
United Kingdom (BPI)	Silver	200,000^{‡}
United States (RIAA)	Platinum	1,000,000^{‡}
^{‡} Sales+streaming figures based on certification alone.

== Release history ==
Region	Date	Format	Label	Ref.
United States	February 26, 2016	Digital download	Republic; Universal	
United States	March 1, 2016	Top 40 radio	Republic	
