= Starving (song) =

2016 song by Hailee Steinfeld and Grey featuring Zedd

Single by Hailee Steinfeld and Grey featuring Zedd

from the album Stay + and the EP Haiz (reissue edition)
- Released: July 19, 2016
- Genre: Pop; EDM
- Length: 3:01
- Label: Republic; Universal
- Songwriters: Michael Trewartha; Kyle Trewartha; Robert McCurdy; Christopher Petrosino; Asia Whiteacre
- Producers: Grey; Zedd; Chris "Tek" O'Ryan (voc.)

Hailee Steinfeld singles chronology
"Rock Bottom" (2016)	"Starving" (2016)	"Digital Love" (2017)

Grey singles chronology
"Starving" (2016)	"Adrenaline" (2016)

Zedd singles chronology
"True Colors" (2016)	"Starving" (2016)	"Adrenaline" (2016)

Music video
- "Starving" on YouTube

"Starving" is a song by American singer Hailee Steinfeld and American duo Grey, featuring Russian-German producer Zedd. The song was written by Grey members Michael Trewartha and Kyle Trewartha, Robert McCurdy, Christopher Petrosino, and Asia Whiteacre. The song, a pop and EDM record, was produced by Grey and Zedd themselves, alongside Chris "Tek" O'Ryan. It was released on July 19, 2016, through Republic Records and Universal Music Group, as Grey's debut single. "Starving" is included on the third digital reissue edition of Steinfeld's debut extended play (EP), Haiz (2016), alongside the Japanese edition of the EP and Zedd's first compilation album, Stay + (2017).

Upon its release, the song was received positively by music critics, who praised the record for its sound and lyrics. Commercially, the single reached the top 10 in Australia, Canada, Denmark, Ireland, New Zealand, and the United Kingdom, and number 12 in the United States. The song was also certified 4× Platinum in Canada, New Zealand, and the United States. It is currently Steinfeld's highest-charting single to date. A music video for the song, released on September 27, 2016, features Steinfeld dancing with a quartet of shirtless men.

== Background ==
In an interview with Nylon's Irina Grechko, Steinfeld said "'Starving' is a song about sort of knowing someone, or getting to know that certain someone, to the point where even though you were somebody before that person came along, they have given you this whole new outlook on yourself and on life. It's this idea that since you came into my life everything is different, and I didn't know that it could be this different since you came into my life."

== Release ==
The song was originally released as a non-album single on the 19th of July, 2016, through Republic Records and Universal Music Group, before it was included on the third digital reissue of Steinfeld's debut extended play (EP), Haiz (released via Republic). It would later be put onto the EP's Japanese edition, released on the 19th of August, 2016. As for Zedd, the song was released on his debut compilation album, Stay +, released on the 27th of December, 2017, through Universal Music Japan.

== Critical reception ==
Katherine Barner of Idolator called the song "a dreamy, teen romance anthem." Teen Vogue's Isis Briones said that the song "has a soft guitar start and builds up to a mellow dance tune, perfect for a low-key summer night with your best friends. Thanks to the catchy lyrics and Zedd's smooth transitions, you'll instantly pick up on all the words to the song after just listening to it a few times. There's no doubt this single will soon top the charts, so get on it early and add it to your playlist ASAP."

== Commercial performance ==
"Starving" debuted at number 96 on the Billboard Hot 100 chart dated August 20, 2016. The song rose 31–24 on the chart dated October 15, 2016, making it Steinfeld's highest-charting single to date (ahead of the number 30-peaking "Love Myself"). It reached a peak position of 12 on the chart dated December 17, 2016. "Starving" is Steinfeld's second top 40 single, Grey's first, and Zedd's fifth. It is also Steinfeld's highest-charting single on the Billboard Hot 100 to date. By the end of 2016, the song was positioned at number 94 on the chart.

On the Pop Airplay chart, "Starving" debuted at number 32 on the chart dated August 13, 2016 and reached a peak position of 5 on the chart dated January 14, 2017. The single became Steinfeld's first top 10 on the chart in November 2016. The single also charted at number 8 on the Adult Pop Airplay chart, number 34 on the Dance Club Songs chart, number 12 on the Dance/Mix Show Airplay, and number 34 on the Rhythmic Airplay chart. It was also certified 4× Platinum by the Recording Industry Association of America (RIAA) for equivalent sales of 4,000,000 units in the United States. By the end of 2017, the song was positioned at number 40 on the Adult Top 40 and number 34 on the Mainstream Top 40.

In Canada, "Starving" debuted at number 86 on the Billboard Canadian Hot 100 chart dated August 27, 2016. The song reached a peak position of 9 on the chart dated January 14, 2017, earning Steinfeld her first top 10 single in that country. It was certified 4× Platinum by Music Canada (MC) for equivalent sales of 320,000 units in the country.

== Music video ==
The music video for "Starving" was directed by Darren Craig and released on September 27, 2016. It features Steinfeld dancing with four shirtless male back-up dancers, as well as a cameo appearance by Grey.

== Charts and certifications ==
=== Weekly charts ===
Weekly chart performance for "Starving"
Chart (2016–2017)	Peak position
Australia (ARIA)	5
Austria (Ö3 Austria Top 40)	31
Belgium (Ultratop 50 Flanders)	20
Belgium (Ultratop 50 Wallonia)	43
Canada Hot 100 (Billboard)	9
Canada AC (Billboard)	46
Canada CHR/Top 40 (Billboard)	6
Canada Hot AC (Billboard)	21
Czech Republic Airplay (ČNS IFPI)	17
Czech Republic Singles Digital (ČNS IFPI)	10
Denmark (Tracklisten)	8
Germany (GfK)	47
Hungary (Rádiós Top 40)	21
Hungary (Single Top 40)	23
Ireland (IRMA)	8
Italy (FIMI)	39
Italian Airplay (EarOne)	80
Mexico Airplay (Billboard)	35
Netherlands (Dutch Top 40)	7
Netherlands (Single Top 100)	11
New Zealand (Recorded Music NZ)	5
Norway (VG-lista)	11
Poland Airplay (ZPAV)	63
Portugal (AFP)	20
Scottish Singles Sales (Official Charts)	3
Slovakia Airplay (ČNS IFPI)	59
Slovakia Singles Digital (ČNS IFPI)	18
Spain (Promusicae)	74
Sweden (Sverigetopplistan)	15
Switzerland (Schweizer Hitparade)	45
UK Singles (Official Charts)	5
US Billboard Hot 100	12
US Adult Pop Airplay (Billboard)	8
US Dance Club Songs (Billboard)	34
US Dance Airplay (Billboard)	12
US Pop Airplay (Billboard)	5
US Rhythmic Airplay (Billboard)	34

=== Year-end charts ===
Year-end chart performance for "Starving"
Chart (2016)	Position
Australia (ARIA)	36
Canada (Canadian Hot 100)	88
Denmark (Tracklisten)	82
Netherlands (Dutch Top 40)	44
Netherlands (Single Top 100)	72
New Zealand (Recorded Music NZ)	49
UK Singles (Official Charts Company)	57
US Billboard Hot 100	94

Chart (2017)	Position
Canada (Canadian Hot 100)	80
US Billboard Hot 100	82
US Adult Top 40 (Billboard)	40
US Mainstream Top 40 (Billboard)	34

=== Certifications ===
Certifications for "Starving"
Region	Certification	Certified units/sales
Australia (ARIA)	2× Platinum	140,000^{‡}
Austria (IFPI Austria)	Platinum	30,000^{‡}
Belgium (BRMA)	Gold	10,000^{‡}
Brazil (Pro-Música Brasil)	3× Platinum	180,000^{‡}
Canada (Music Canada)	4× Platinum	320,000^{‡}
Denmark (IFPI Danmark)	2× Platinum	180,000^{‡}
France (SNEP)	Gold	66,666^{‡}
Germany (BVMI)	Gold	200,000^{‡}
Italy (FIMI)	2× Platinum	100,000^{‡}
New Zealand (RMNZ)	5× Platinum	150,000^{‡}
Portugal (AFP)	Gold	5,000^{‡}
Spain (Promusicae)	Gold	30,000^{‡}
Sweden (GLF)	Platinum	40,000^{‡}
United Kingdom (BPI)	2× Platinum	1,200,000^{‡}
United States (RIAA)	4× Platinum	4,000,000^{‡}
^{‡} Sales+streaming figures based on certification alone.

== Release history ==
Release dates and formats for "Starving"
Region	Date	Format	Version	Label	Ref.
United States	July 19, 2016	Contemporary hit radio	Original	Republic	
Worldwide	July 22, 2016	Digital download	Original	Republic; Universal	
United States	October 4, 2016	Rhythmic radio	Original	Republic	
United Kingdom	October 14, 2016	Contemporary hit radio	Original	Republic	
Italy	October 28, 2016	Contemporary hit radio	Original	Universal	
United States	November 11, 2016	Digital download	Acoustic	Republic; Universal	
United States	February 3, 2017	Digital download	Remixes EP	Republic; Universal	
