= Love Myself (Hailee Steinfeld song) =

Single by Hailee Steinfeld

from the EP Haiz
- Released: August 7, 2015
- Recorded: 2015
- Genre: Dance-pop; electropop
- Length: 3:38
- Label: Republic; Universal
- Songwriters: Mattias Larsson; Lance Moreno; Oscar Holter; Julia Michaels; Justin Tranter
- Producers: Mattman & Robin; Oscar Holter

Hailee Steinfeld singles chronology
"Love Myself" (2015)	"Rock Bottom" (2016)

Music video
- "Love Myself" on YouTube

"Love Myself" is the debut single by American actress and singer Hailee Steinfeld. It was released on August 7, 2015, through Republic Records and Universal Music Group, as the lead single from her debut extended play (EP), Haiz (2015). The song was written by Mattias Larsson, Robin Fredriksson, Oscar Holter, Julia Michaels, and Justin Tranter, with the production being handled by Holter, with Larsson and Fredriksson under their stage name Mattman & Robin.

A dance-pop and electropop record, the track lyrically centres around self-confidence and has been referred to as an "ode to masturbation" in the media. The song received positive reviews from contemporary music critics who praised Steinfeld's voice and style, comparing positively to Taylor Swift and Selena Gomez. The song also found commercial success, peaking at number 30 on the Billboard Hot 100, number six on the US Dance Club Songs chart and number 15 on the Billboard Pop Songs chart.

== Background and release ==
Steinfeld gained recognition as a singer after performing a cover of Jessie J's "Flashlight" in Pitch Perfect 2 (2015) which she also starred in. Named "Flashlight (Sweet Life Mix)", the cover was released on the special edition of the movie's soundtrack, appearing alongside the original version, and was certified Gold by Recorded Music New Zealand (RMNZ). She would soon sign with Republic Records in the beginning of 2015. "Love Myself" was released as Steinfeld's debut single on August 7, 2015. Billboard noted that:

"The 18-year-old, who showed the world her chops as the standout newcomer in Pitch Perfect 2, brings all the self-confidence a girl could need to the empowering anthem."

== Music and lyrics ==
The song was described as a "sugary, feel-good pop jam". The lyrics to the song include "I'm gonna put my body first/And love me so hard 'til it hurts" and "I'm gonna touch the pain away/I know how to scream my own name"; the music video, released one week later, features Steinfeld wearing a leotard emblazoned with "self service". This prompted many fans and media outlets to dub the song an "ode to masturbation". According to musicnotes.com, the song is written in G minor, with a chord sequence of Cm-Gm-B♭-Cm-Eb^{2} and has a tempo of 120 beats per minute in common time.

== Themes and analysis ==
Vulture writer Dee Lockett noted that Steinfeld "made her ode to masturbation just subliminal enough to fly over a less-involved parent's head, and its sugary TeenNick-appropriate production probably will not raise any suspicions either". She also pointed out a feminist lens of the song saying that if "Love Myself" means the music industry "might finally let young female pop-stars stop pretending that men are the only way they can get off, then Hailee Steinfeld might've just thrown her name into the conversation about pop's new feminist generation".

Steinfeld herself has stated that the meaning of the song is intended to be interpreted by the listener, "but for me it's an empowerment record and it’s ultimately about taking care of yourself and indulging yourself, whether that be emotionally or physically or with material things." Steinfeld noted in an interview with MTV that "there is that sense of fearlessness, which I think kind of came from that word exactly: just being fearless and being able to kind of put myself out there".

== Critical reception ==
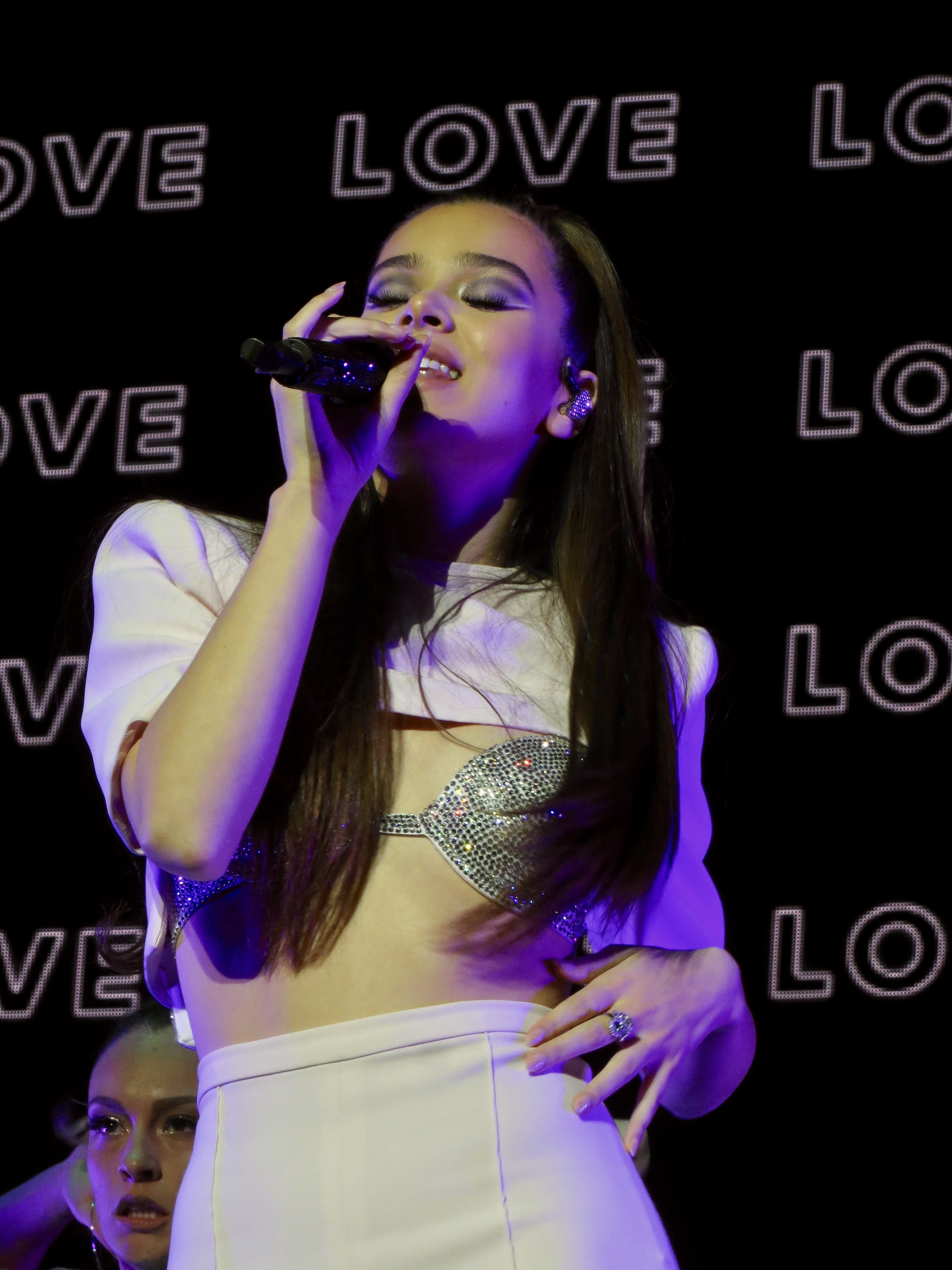
Steinfeld performing the song on the Witness Tour in 2017

Upon release, the track received positive reviews. The Young Folks writer Brooke Pawling Stennet wrote that she "shows great potential through her debut track" calling it a "solid debut for a young Steinfeld now eighteen years old and ready to make a name for herself". She did feel that the 2015-2016 trend for being "body positive" is not captivated in the song but noted that it is still a "fun song that lies in the same vein as the new style that artists like Taylor Swift, Selena Gomez, and One Direction are all pushing towards as they break free of their own invisible chains of adolescent and innocent teeny bop status". The Independent also praised the track saying that it "leaves any listener feeling empowered and happy with themselves". They also called the song "pop bliss" praising Hailee's unique voice and comparing it to Tove Lo and Ariana Grande. They went on to sat that "if this is what [Steinfeld] has to offer on her debut, then she is an artist to look out for".

Vulture writer Dee Lockett also praise the song noting "a glaze to Steinfeld’s vocal style on the track that's unmistakably Swift-influenced. She also compared the song's "down to the shout-sung 'I love me!' hook" to Kendrick Lamar. She also compared the song to Selena Gomez's "Good for You" noting that Steinfeld also "celebrates a sexual awakening". MTV writer Madeline Roth called Steinfeld a "fearless pop star" noting that she "came roaring out the gate with a self-empowerment anthem" which sets "her apart from the pack of pop stars who came before her". She also compared "Love Myself" to the debut singles of Britney Spears, Christina Aguilera, Mandy Moore, Jessica Simpson, Selena Gomez and Taylor Swift ("...Baby One More Time, "Genie In a Bottle", "Candy", "I Wanna Love You Forever", "Come & Get It" and "Tim McGraw" respectively). Roth added that the song is "a strong statement for a 19-year-old to make, and in a way, it's one that only someone as young and optimistic as her could make".

== Commercial performance ==
=== United States of America ===
Upon its release, the song was commercially successful for a new artist. On release, the single peaked at number 30 on the Billboard Hot 100, alongside charting at number 36 on the Adult Pop Airplay chart, number six on the US Dance Club Songs chart, number 30 on the Dance/Mix Show Airplay chart, and number 15 on the Billboard Pop Songs chart. On the latter, the song debuted at number 27, marking the highest debut for a solo female artist on the chart in 17 years, since Natalie Imbruglia's single "Torn" entered at number 26 in 1998. By the end of 2016, the song was positioned at number 48 on the Dance Club Songs chart. The song was also certified 2× Platinum by the Recording Industry Association of America (RIAA) for equivalent sales of 2,000,000 units in the United States of America.

=== Canada ===
In Canada, the single charted higher than in the United States of America, peaking at number 15 on the Canadian Hot 100. It also charted at number 37 on the AC Airplay and number 16 on both the CHR/Top 40 chart and the Hot AC chart. The single was also certified 2× Platinum by Music Canada (MC) for equivalent sales of 160,000 units in the country. By the end of 2015, the single was positioned at number 79 on the Canadian Hot 100.

=== Europe ===
In Belgium, the single charted at number 4 on the Ultratip Bubbling Under chart, in Flanders, its highest position on any chart, and number 29 on the Ultratip Bubbling Under chart in Wallonia. In the Czech Republic, the single charted at number 43 on the Rádio – Top 100 chart and peaked at number 12 on the Singles Digital Top 100 chart. In Denmark, the single charted at number 36 on the Tracklisten chart and was certified Platinum by IFPI Danmark (IFPI DEN) for equivalent sales of 90,000 units in the country. In Ireland, the single charted at number 51 on the Irish Singles Chart. In Italy, the single peaked at number 50 on the Italian Singles Chart and was certified Platinum by Federazione Industria Musicale Italiana (FIMI) for equivalent sales of 50,000 units in the country. In Netherlands, the single charted at number 26 on the Dutch Top 40 and number 37 on the Dutch Single Top 100. By the end of 2015, the single was positioned at number 99 on the NPO 3FM chart.

In Norway, the single peaked at number 20 on the VG-lista charts. In Slovakia, the single charted at number 72 on the Rádio – Top 100 and peaked at number 12 on the Singles Digital Top 100. In Spain, although the single did not chart, it was certified Gold by Productores de Música de España (PROMUSICAE) for equivalent sales of 30,000 units in the country. In Sweden, the single charted at number 35 on the Sverigetopplistan chart and was certified Platinum by Grammofonleverantörernas förening (GLF) for equivalent sales of 40,000 units in the country. In the United Kingdom, the single peaked at number 180 on the UK singles chart, its lowest position on any chart, and was certified Platinum by the British Phonographic Industry (BPI) for equivalent sales of 600,000 units in the country.

=== Other countries ===
In Australia, the single peaked at number 92 on the ARIA Charts. In Brazil, although the single did not chart, it was still certified 2× Platinum by Pro-Música Brasil (PMB) for equivalent sales of 120,000 units in the country. In Israel, the single peaked at number 5 on the Media Forest TV Airplay chart. In Japan, the single charted at number 35 on the Japan Hot 100. In New Zealand, the song charted at number 19 on the Official Aotearoa Music Charts and was certified 2× Platinum by Recorded Music New Zealand (RMNZ) for equivalent sales of 60,000 units in the country. In Switzerland, the single charted at number 64 on the Schweizer Hitparade chart.

== Music video ==
The accompanying music video, directed by Hannah Lux Davis, was released on August 14, 2015. The video shows Steinfeld dancing through Los Angeles with several other people. The music video currently has over 342,000,000 views and 2,600,000 likes as of August 14, 2026.

== Usage in media ==
The song has been featured in multiple soundtracks, films and television shows. In 2015, the song was included on the Jem and the Holograms soundtrack. The song was also featured in Blockers (2018). In a review for the film, Insider writer Kim Renfro commented that "the anthem carried throughout the movie" and that the song "drives the message home". The song has also been played in Love Island, DC's Stargirl, How to Be Single and at World of Dance events.

== Track listing ==
- Digital download
1. "Love Myself" – 3:38
- Love Myself (Remixes) – EP
1. "Love Myself" (Fareoh Remix - Extended) – 4:47
2. "Love Myself" (KREAM Remix) – 3:41
3. "Love Myself" (Riddler Remix) – 5:05
4. "Love Myself" (Toy Armada & DJ GRIND Club Mix) – 6:11

== Credits and personnel ==
Credits adapted from Qobuz.

- Mattias "Mattman" Larsson – songwriter, backing vocals, producer
- Robin Fredriksson – songwriter, backing vocals, producer
- Oscar Holter – songwriter, engineer, producer
- Hailee Steinfeld – lead vocals
- Julia Michaels – songwriter, backing vocals
- Justin Tranter – songwriter, backing vocals
- Max Martin – percussion
- John Hanes – assistant recording engineer
- John Cranfield – assistant recording engineer
- Serban Ghenea – mixer
- Tom Coyne – mastering engineer
- Randy Merrill – mastering engineer

== Charts ==
=== Weekly charts ===
Chart (2015–16)	Peak position
Australia (ARIA)	92
Belgium (Ultratip Bubbling Under Flanders)	4
Belgium (Ultratip Bubbling Under Wallonia)	29
Canada Hot 100 (Billboard)	15
Canada AC (Billboard)	37
Canada CHR/Top 40 (Billboard)	16
Canada Hot AC (Billboard)	16
Czech Republic Airplay (ČNS IFPI)	43
Czech Republic Singles Digital (ČNS IFPI)	12
Denmark (Tracklisten)	36
Hungary (Stream Top 40)	21
Ireland (IRMA)	51
Israel (Media Forest TV Airplay)	5
Italy (FIMI)	50
Japan Hot 100 (Billboard)	35
Netherlands (Dutch Top 40)	26
Netherlands (Single Top 100)	37
New Zealand (Recorded Music NZ)	19
Norway (VG-lista)	20
Slovakia Airplay (ČNS IFPI)	72
Slovakia Singles Digital (ČNS IFPI)	12
Sweden (Sverigetopplistan)	35
Switzerland (Schweizer Hitparade)	64
UK Singles (Official Charts Company)	180
US Billboard Hot 100	30
US Adult Pop Airplay (Billboard)	36
US Dance Club Songs (Billboard)	6
US Dance Airplay (Billboard)	30
US Pop Airplay (Billboard)	15

=== Year-end charts ===
Chart (2015)	Position
Canada (Canadian Hot 100)	79
Netherlands (NPO 3FM)	99
Chart (2016)	Position
US Dance Club Songs (Billboard)	48

== Certifications ==
Region	Certification	Certified units/sales
Brazil (Pro-Música Brasil)	2× Platinum	120,000^{‡}
Canada (Music Canada)	2× Platinum	160,000^{‡}
Denmark (IFPI Danmark)	Platinum	90,000^{‡}
Italy (FIMI)	Platinum	50,000^{‡}
New Zealand (RMNZ)	2× Platinum	60,000^{‡}
Spain (Promusicae)	Gold	30,000^{‡}
Sweden (GLF)	Platinum	40,000^{‡}
United Kingdom (BPI)	Platinum	600,000^{‡}
United States (RIAA)	2× Platinum	2,000,000^{‡}
^{‡} Sales+streaming figures based on certification alone.
