= Radio Disney Music Award for Best Crush Song =

Annual US music award

The following is a list of Radio Disney Music Award winners and nominees for Best Crush Song .

== Winners and nominees ==
=== 2010s ===
Year	Winner	Nominees	Ref.
2013	"Had Me @ Hello" – Olivia Holt	"Wish You Were Here" – Cody Simpson featuring Becky G; "Say You're Just a Friend" – Austin Mahone; "Heart Skips a Beat" – Olly Murs	
2014	"Still Into You" – Paramore	"Chloe (You're the One I Want)" – Emblem3; "What About Love" – Austin Mahone	
2015	"Can't Blame a Girl for Trying" – Sabrina Carpenter	"Jealous" – Nick Jonas; "Steal My Girl" – One Direction	
2016	"Perfect" – One Direction	"Love Me Like You Do" – Ellie Goulding; "One Call Away" – Charlie Puth; "Should've Been Us" – Tori Kelly	
2017	"Let Me Love You" – DJ Snake featuring Justin Bieber	"On Purpose" – Sabrina Carpenter; "Starving" – Hailee Steinfeld and Grey featuring Zedd; "Wild" – Troye Sivan featuring Alessia Cara; "Yeah Boy" – Kelsea Ballerini	
2018	"Perfect" – Ed Sheeran	"I Like Me Better" – Lauv; "Why" – Sabrina Carpenter; "Ins and Outs" – Sofia Carson; "Legends" – Kelsea Ballerini	
