= Diarmuid Murphy (writer) =

Irish writer and theatre/film producer

Diarmuid Murphy (1895–1966) was an Irish writer, theatre and film producer.

Murphy was known as a short story writer, and Professor of English at University College, Galway. He was chairman of An Taibhdhearc na Gaillimhe up to his death.

== Bibliography ==
- Hewn of the Rock, Dublin and Cork, Talbot Press, 1934.

== See also ==
- Richard Murphy, born 1927
- Tom Murphy, born 1935

Preceded by ?	Chairman of Taibhdhearc na Gaillimhe ? – 1966	Succeeded by ?
