= Flashlight (Jessie J song) =

2015 single by Jessie J

Single by Jessie J

from the album Pitch Perfect 2: Original Motion Picture Soundtrack
- Released: 23 April 2015
- Recorded: 2014
- Genre: Pop
- Length: 3:29
- Label: Republic
- Songwriters: Sia Furler; Christian Guzman; Jason Moore; Sam Smith
- Producers: Greg Kurstin; Kuk Harrell

Jessie J singles chronology
"Masterpiece" (2015)	"Flashlight" (2015)	"Ain't Been Done" (2015)

Pitch Perfect singles chronology
"Cups ("When I'm Gone")" (2013)	"Flashlight" (2015)

Music video
- "Flashlight" on YouTube

"Flashlight (Sweet Life Mix)"

Song by Hailee Steinfeld

from the album Pitch Perfect 2: Original Motion Picture Soundtrack (special edition) and the EP Haiz (Japanese edition)
- Released: May 12, 2015 (Pitch Perfect 2); August 19, 2016 (Haiz)
- Recorded: 2015
- Length: 2:58
- Label: Republic
- Songwriters: Sia Furler; Sam Smith; Christian Guzman; Jason Moore

"Flashlight" is a song recorded by British singer Jessie J for the soundtrack to the film Pitch Perfect 2 (2015). The song was written by Sia, Christian Guzman, Jason Moore, and Sam Smith. The song was originally obtained when one pre-ordered the Pitch Perfect 2 soundtrack in the United States, beginning on 23 April 2015; it later became available for download on its own. "Flashlight" was released in the United Kingdom on 11 May 2015 both on the soundtrack and as a stand-alone single.

The song received mixed reviews from music critics; some praised Jessie J's vocal performance, while others dismissed the ballad as generic and predictable. Despite the critical reception, "Flashlight" peaked at number one in Malaysia and The Philippines, number two in Australia, number seven in New Zealand, and number thirteen in the UK. The song would also become Jessie's J final chart entry to date.

Hailee Steinfeld performed a version of "Flashlight" (titled the "Sweet Life Mix") in the film Pitch Perfect 2. Her version of the song is included on the special edition of the film's soundtrack, as well as Japanese version of Steinfeld's debut EP, Haiz (2015). It would eventually be certified Gold by Recorded Music New Zealand (RMNZ). A remix titled the "Math Club Remix" is also included on the Target exclusive version of the special edition.

== Composition ==
According to the sheet music published at musicnotes.com, the song has a tempo of 74 beats per minute. Jessie J's version is in the key of F major. Hailee Steinfeld's version is in E-flat major.

== Critical reception ==
"Flashlight" received generally mixed reviews. In a less favourable review, Steven J. Horowitz of Billboard gave the song two stars out of five, saying: "prone to funny bone shout-singing on her more upbeat singles, Jessie J dials back her vocal force on the tepid "Flashlight", off the Pitch Perfect 2 soundtrack. The more subtle delivery would be welcome if the track weren't so paint-by-numbers, it plays like a pantomime of a Sia ballad, but without the emotive edge."

== Music video ==
The music video (directed by Hannah Lux Davis) was released on 23 April 2015 on YouTube. In the video, Jessie J heads to Barden University (the campus of UCLA) where she performs the ballad while watching the students go about their days while walking around the campus, while scenes from Pitch Perfect 2 are shown.

== Use in film ==
The song is first sung by Barden University freshman Emily (Hailee Steinfeld) for her audition into the Barden Bellas, who have been suspended from competition. Emily explains that she writes songs to compensate for her anxieties, in this case, leaving home. Emily sings the song again later during the "Riff Off" which, due to it being an original song, causes the Bellas to be disqualified.

Upon learning that Emily writes her own songs, Beca (Anna Kendrick) offers to work with her on it and record the song in a studio. At the climax of the film, the Bellas incorporate "Flashlight" into their World Championships setlist.

== Chart performance ==
The song debuted on the Billboard Hot 100 chart on 6 June 2015, at number 68. The song debuted on the UK Singles Chart on 24 May 2015, at number 62, eventually reaching number 13. The song debuted on the ARIA Charts on 18 May 2015, at number 15 and reached number 2 as of 8 June 2015. It reached number one in Indonesia.

== Charts ==
=== Weekly charts ===
Chart (2015)	Peak position
Australia (ARIA)	2
Austria (Ö3 Austria Top 40)	37
Belgium (Ultratip Bubbling Under Flanders)	8
Canada Hot 100 (Billboard)	57
Czech Republic Airplay (ČNS IFPI)	37
Czech Republic Singles Digital (ČNS IFPI)	31
France (SNEP)	89
Germany (GfK)	38
Ireland (IRMA)	31
Italy (FIMI)	89
Netherlands (Single Top 100)	55
Malaysia (RIM)	1
New Zealand (Recorded Music NZ)	7
Norway (VG-lista)	29
Philippines (PARI)	1
Scottish Singles Sales (Official Charts)	9
Slovakia Airplay (ČNS IFPI)	33
Sweden (Sverigetopplistan)	54
Switzerland (Schweizer Hitparade)	28
UK Singles (Official Charts)	13
US Billboard Hot 100	61

=== Year-end charts ===
Chart (2015)	Position
Australia (ARIA)	40
Taiwan (Hito Radio)	27

== Certifications ==
Region	Certification	Certified units/sales
Australia (ARIA)	4× Platinum	280,000^{‡}
Brazil (Pro-Música Brasil)	2× Diamond	500,000^{‡}
Denmark (IFPI Danmark)	Platinum	90,000^{‡}
Germany (BVMI)	Gold	200,000^{‡}
Italy (FIMI)	Gold	25,000^{‡}
New Zealand (RMNZ)	2× Platinum	60,000^{‡}
South Korea (Gaon)	—	139,137
Sweden (GLF)	Gold	20,000^{‡}
United Kingdom (BPI)	Platinum	600,000^{‡}
^{‡} Sales+streaming figures based on certification alone.

== Release history ==
Region	Date	Format	Label
United States	23 April 2015	Digital download	Republic
United Kingdom	11 May 2015	Digital download	Republic

== See also ==
- List of top 10 singles for 2015 in Australia
