= The Fat Lady Sings =

Rock band

- Origin: Dublin, Ireland
- Genres: rock, alternative rock
- Years active: 1986–1994 and 2005
- Labels: East West Records, Warner Bros. Records
- Past members: Nick Kelly; Robert Hamilton; Tim Bradshaw; Dermot Lynch
- Website: www.thefatladysings.net

The Fat Lady Sings were a rock band from Dublin, Ireland, fronted by singer and songwriter Nick Kelly. Almost immediately after forming in March 1986, they relocated to London, and remained there for the rest of their career. Despite this, they gained more media attention and commercial success in their native Ireland, with a series of five top 20 singles in 1990/91, than they did in the UK.

== Career ==
The band remained self-financed and self-managed for eighteen months, building a substantial live following, including sold-out gigs at London's Town & Country Club (now The Forum) and Dublin's National Stadium. Having released a string of singles on independent labels, The Fat Lady Sings (TFLS) signed to East West Records. In October 1990, they released their first major label single "Man Scared", followed by the debut album Twist in May 1991. Twist spawned three more singles: a re-release of “Arclight” (April 1991), “Twist” (May 1991) and “Deborah” (August 1991). The second album Johnson was produced by Steve Osborne and with Nic France replacing founding member Robert Hamilton on drums, was released in June 1993, following the lead single "Show of Myself". The second single, "Drunkard Logic", became the band's highest UK chart position, peaking at no. 56 in July 1993. The band spent six months on tour promoting Johnson, including three months in the US, concluding with a final show in New York's CBGB in December 1993. In January 1994 the band split when frontman and only songwriter Nick Kelly surprisingly quit the band.

In 2005, the band reformed for a one-off show at Dublin's Vicar Street and have subsequently reformed very sporadically for other shows and festivals. They released the two-album compilation The Fat Lady Sing(le)s / Opera Oscura containing singles, B-sides and rarities on Warner Bros. Records.

== Post-TFLS careers ==
In 1993, drummer Robert Hamilton, who left before the second album, and Ali McMordie set up the charity project Peace Together, which released a compilation album including versions of the TFLS track "Be Still" featuring Elizabeth Fraser, Peter Gabriel, Nanci Griffith, Clive Langer, Sinéad O'Connor, Feargal Sharkey, and Jah Wobble.

Guitarist Tim Bradshaw and bassist Dermot Lynch had some chart success in America as members of the band Dog's Eye View in 1995. Subsequently, Bradshaw worked as a session and live musician, for Eddi Reader Tanita Tikaram, The Fatima Mansions, John Mayer, Afro Celt Sound System, and David Grayfor whom he still plays. He also produced albums for Tom Bertram and Bill Pritchard. Lynch also played for David Gray and went on to work as a tour and production manager for Keane, Fun Lovin' Criminals and Supergrass and a host of other artists.

Singer and songwriter Nick Kelly released his first solo album, Between Trapezes, independently in 1997, and became the Best Solo Male Artist at the 1998–99 Irish Music Critics Awards. In 2005, he released his second album, Running Dog, on his own label. More recently, he has recorded with the project Alien Envoy, who released the album Nine Lives in 2010. Kelly also works as a commercial director and released a short film called Shoe which made the Oscar shortlist for Live Action Short in 2011. In 2017, Kelly released his longform directorial debut The Drummer and the Keeper, a film which featured Dermot Murphy, and Jacob McCarthy.

In 2019, Kelly released "Hair Trigger" as part of an Irish supergroup called The Unelectables, a group which also featured Les Keye of The Wilde Oscars, Paul Byrne of In Tua Nua, Daragh O’Toole and Seán “Doctor” Millar of The Cute Hoors. With Doctor Miller, Kelly formed the duo DOGS, who played Glastonbury's Croissant Neuf stage in June 2023 as part of their Song Cycle tour, a series of dates which saw Kelly cycle 360 km from his home to Glastonbury playing a number of gigs in Ireland, Wales and Bristol on the way. Kelly was interviewed by the BBC for a feature about the Song Cycle tour and his trip to Croissant Neuf on BBC Two's Saturday Night Glastonbury coverage on 24 June 2024, with footage of DOGS playing their song "Old Dog, Young Dog" on the stage from the day before.

== Personnel ==
- Nick Kelly – Lead vocals
- Tim Bradshaw – Guitar
- Dermot Lynch – Bass
- Robert Hamilton – Drums

== Discography ==
=== Singles ===
Year	Title		Chart Positions		Album
Year	Title	Irish Singles Chart	U.S. Modern Rock	UK Singles Chart	Album
1986	"Fear and Favour"	–	–	–	non-album single
1988	"Be Still"	–	–	–	non-album single
1989	"Arclight"	–	–	–	non-album single
1990	"Dronning Maud Land"	6	–	–	non-album single
1990	"Man Scared"	17	20	–	Twist
1991	"Arclight"	7	–	76	Twist
1991	"Twist"	14	–	95	Twist
1991	"Deborah"	17	–	95	Twist
1993	"Show of Myself"	–	–	76	Johnson
1993	"Drunkard Logic"	–	–	56	Johnson
1993	"World Exploding Touch"	–	–	82	Johnson

=== Albums ===
- Twist (1991)
- John Son (1993)
