= 2011 Academy Awards =

2011 Academy Awards may refer to:

- 83rd Academy Awards, the Academy Awards ceremony which took place in 2011 honouring the best in film for 2010
- 84th Academy Awards, the Academy Awards ceremony which took place in 2012 honouring the best in film for 2011
