= Mexican Pets =

- Origin: Dublin, Ireland
- Genres: Indie/Punk rock
- Years active: 1990–present?
- Label: None
- Members: Patrick Clafferty (guitar, vocals); Derrick Dalton (bass guitar); Fionan O Leary (drums); Brian Gough (guitar, vocals, organ)
- Website: Irish Music Central Site

Mexican Pets were formed by Patrick Clafferty and Jill Hahn in Dublin, Ireland in 1991 inspired by American bands such as Hüsker Dü and Dinosaur Jr. The two soon drafted Derrick Dalton in on bass whose distinct and accomplished style was an invaluable contribution to the band's sound. The band never featured a permanent drummer and a string of players graced the stool including two guys called Eric, both of them American. Having made several demo recordings and playing extensive gigs around the country, they had their first break up. Each of its members pursued other musical interests until the spring of 1994 when they reformed. In that same year they found a permanent drummer in Fionan O Leary. Jill Hahn then moved to Manchester, replaced by Brian Gough on other guitar and organ. They recorded their first album Nobody's Working Title on Independent Records that summer and continued to play across the country.

It was then that Andy Cairns from northern rockers Therapy? released four singles on his label Blunt. Two of these singles featured the songs off the band's first record and six brand new songs were quickly penned for the final two. This was also released on CD format under the title "The Voice of Trucker Youth". Every one of the four singles was each awarded 'single of the week' by Hot Press. One bizarre event was when they played Whelan's in Dublin's city centre. Having seen a poster for the band, the Mexican Ambassador turned up at the gig with his driver and bodyguard, curious to see who the Mexican act were. The ambassador watched the gig then came backstage and thanked the band for their performance. So enthralled was he by the band that he invited them out to the embassy on his retirement where they performed an a cappella version of "A Gringo like Me", for the ambassador and crowd, including the Papal Nuncio to Ireland.

In 1995, Derrick Dalton left and was replaced by John Duff. The band began to play their first gigs in London, frequenting the infamous venues in Camden Town and it was not long before they came to the attention of the legendary Seymour Stein who came to see them play with The Poster Children and Steelpole Bathtub in London. 1996 saw The Pets tour in Germany and the Netherlands and several return visits to London. In August of that year they recorded their final album, Humbucker, which featured a tougher, guitar-driven sound. The record was again funded by Cairns who had become an invaluable patron of the band.

Having promoted the record with a series of gigs and a brief tour of England, the band called it a day in May 1998.

== Discography ==
=== Albums ===
- Nobody's Working Title (1994)
- The Voice Of Trucker Youth (1996)
- Humbucker (1997)

=== Singles ===
- Subside (1995)
- How To Have More Fun (1995)
- Diana The Moon (1995)
- Where's My Pony / Mackerel Sky High (1995)
- Supermarket (1997)
