= Sack (band) =

Irish band

- Origin: Dublin, Ireland
- Genres: Alternative, Indie rock, Indie pop
- Years active: 1994–present
- Labels: Lemon; Dirt; Jetset junta
- Members: Martin McCann; John Brereton; Tony Brereton; Gavin Fox; Tony Barrett
- Past members: Derek Lee; Ken Haughton; Dave Dorgan; Darrel Rainey; Adrian Traynor; Simon Quigley

Sack are a five-piece Irish band, based in Dublin. To date the band has released three albums: You Are What You Eat, Butterfly Effect and Adventura Majestica. The band formed after the demise of Lord John White.

Their first single "What Did The Christians Ever Do For Us?" was single of the week in both the NME and Melody Maker. They have supported Morrissey on several world tours taking in mainland Europe, North America, and the UK. Sack have also supported the likes of The Fall, Boo Radleys among others. They have gigged sporadically in recent years and are planning to record new material.

The band appeared on the Morrissey-endorsed NME CD Songs to Save Your Life, while "Laughter Lines" appeared on the soundtrack to the movie Carrie 2: The Rage.

== Current members ==
- Martin McCann: lead vocals
- John Brereton: guitars
- Tony Brereton: drums, backing vocals
- Tony Barrett: guitars
- Gavin Fox: bass

== Discography ==
Albums

- You Are What You Eat (1994) Lemon Records
- Butterfly Effect (1997) Dirt Records
- Adventura Majestica (2001) Jetset Junta Records
- Wake Up, People! (2024)

Singles

- Dilettanti (1993)
- Indian Rope Trick. (1993)
- What Did The Christians Ever Do For Us (1994)
- Latitude (1997)
- Laughter Lines (1998)
- What a Way to Live (2021)
- Do You Need Love? (2024)
- Wake Up, People! (2024)
- I Fell Through A Crack (2024)
- Tide's Out (2025)
