= Dermot Murphy (actor) =

Irish actor

- Born: Wexford, County Wexford, Ireland
- Occupation: Actor
- Years active: 2012–present

Dermot Murphy is an Irish actor, known for Raw (2013), Clean Break (2015) and The Drummer and the Keeper (2017). Murphy portrayed musician Bob Geldof in the biographical drama Bohemian Rhapsody (2018).

== Filmography ==
=== Film ===
| Year | Title | Role | Notes |
|---|---|---|---|
| 2012 | No Messages | Pint Teenager | Short film |
| 2013 | Black Ice | Tom Watters | |
| 2017 | The Drummer and the Keeper | Gabriel | |
| 2018 | I made this for you | Aido | |
| 2018 | Bohemian Rhapsody | Bob Geldof | |
| 2019 | Animals | Marty | |
| 2019 | The Martini Shot | Radio | post-production |

=== Television ===
| Year | Title | Role | Notes |
|---|---|---|---|
| 2013 | Raw | Brian | 6 episodes |
| 2015 | 6Degrees | Liam Madigan | 6 episodes |
| 2015 | Clean Break | Snowy | 4 episodes |
| 2016 | Guilt | Sticks | Episode: "Exit Wounds" |
