= Daya discography =

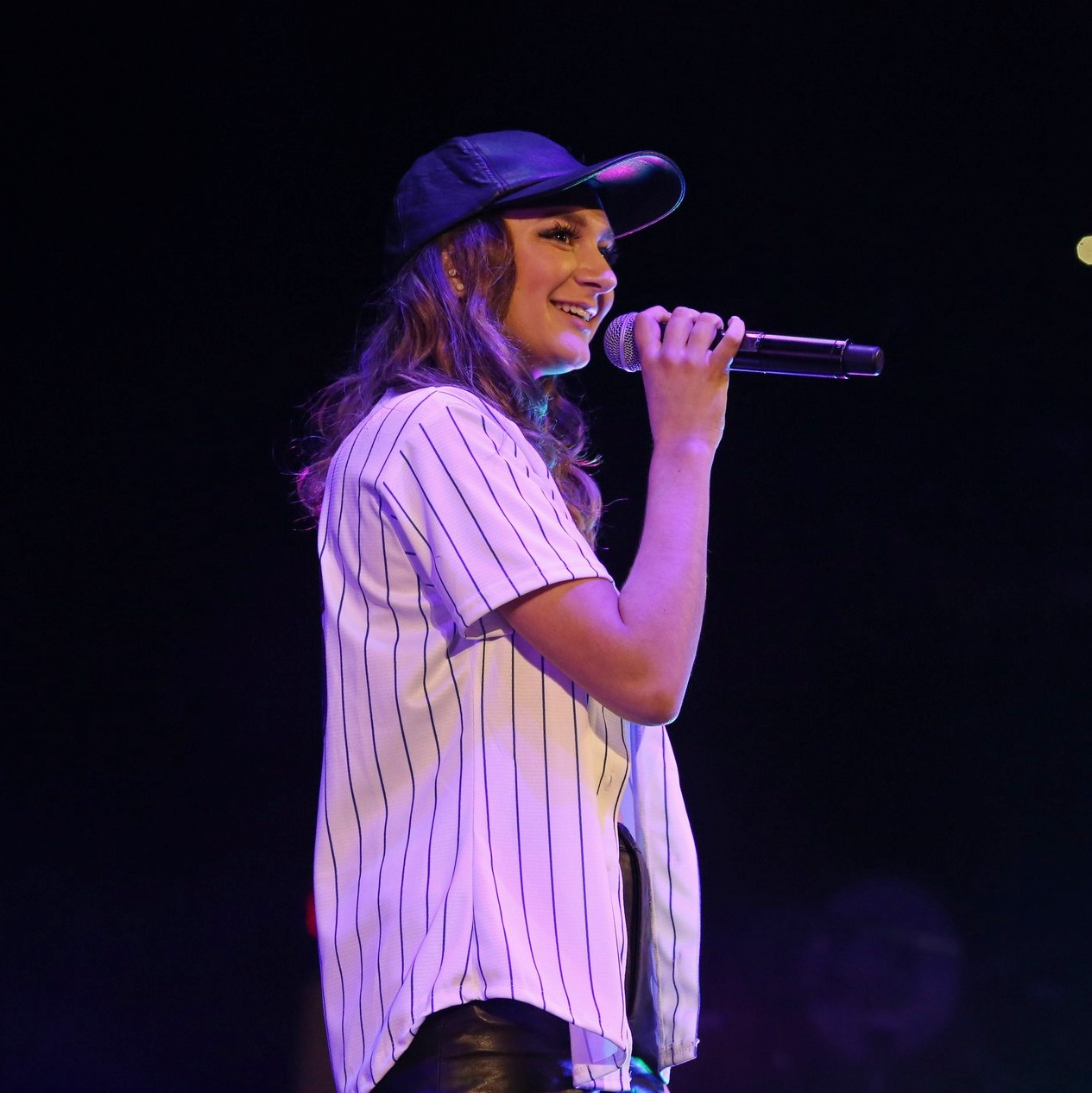
- Daya performing in Chicago in 2015
- Studio albums: 2
- EPs: 3
- Singles: 30
- Music videos: 17
- Promotional singles: 2

American singer Daya has released two studio albums, three extended plays (EP), thirty singles (including three as a featured artist), seventeen music videos, and two promotional singles. She signed with the label Artbeatz in 2015 and released her debut single, "Hide Away", on April 22 that year. The song peaked at number 23 on the US Billboard Hot 100 and reached the top 20 in Australia, Canada, and New Zealand. It preceded Daya's 2015 self-titled debut EP, which charted in Canada, Denmark, Sweden, and the US. She was featured on The Chainsmokers' single "Don't Let Me Down" (2015), which peaked at number three in the US and reached the top 10 in several other countries. Daya's single "Sit Still, Look Pretty" (2016) reached number 28 on the Hot 100. Its 2016 parent album peaked at number 36 in the US and number 40 in Canada, and it earned a Gold certification from the Recording Industry Association of America. The album was additionally supported by the single "Words" (2016).

After signing with Interscope Records in 2017, Daya released the single "New", and she was featured on Gryffin and Illenium's single "Feel Good". Both songs were certified Platinum in Australia; in the US, the former received a Gold certification and the latter Platinum. She released "Safe" and was featured on RL Grime's single "I Wanna Know" the following year. Among Daya's several singles in 2019, "Insomnia" charted at number 12 in Norway and number 79 in Ireland. She released the EPs The Difference and In Between Dreams in 2021 and 2022, respectively.

== Studio albums ==
List of studio albums, with release date, selected chart positions and certifications, and label shown
Title	Details	Peak chart positions		Certifications
Title	Details	US	CAN	Certifications
Sit Still, Look Pretty	Released: October 7, 2016; Label: Artbeatz; Format: CD, digital download, streaming	36	40	RIAA: Gold; BPI: Silver
Til Every Petal Drops	Released: October 10, 2025; Label: ONErpm; Format: CD, digital download, streaming	—	—	

== Extended plays ==
List of EPs, with release date, selected chart positions, and label shown
Title	Details	Peak chart positions			
Title	Details	US	CAN	DEN	SWE
Daya	Released: September 4, 2015; Label: Artbeatz, RED; Format: CD, digital download, streaming	61	99	36	33
The Difference	Released: May 14, 2021; Label: Sandlot Records, AWAL; Formats: CD, digital download, streaming	—	—	—	—
In Between Dreams	Released: September 16, 2022; Label: Sandlot Records, AWAL; Format: Digital download, streaming	—	—	—	—
"—" denotes a recording that did not chart or was not released in that territory.

== Singles ==
=== As lead artist ===
List of singles, with year released, selected chart positions and certifications, and album name shown
Title	Year	Peak chart positions										Certifications	Album
Title	Year	US	AUS	CAN	GER	IRE	NLD	NOR	NZ	SLK	SWE	Certifications	Album
"Hide Away"	2015	23	6	18	44	27	48	29	15	25	55	RIAA: 2× Platinum; ARIA: Platinum; BPI: Gold; BVMI: Gold; GLF: Platinum; MC: Platinum; RMNZ: 3× Platinum	Daya / Sit Still, Look Pretty
"Sit Still, Look Pretty"	2016	28	—	64	—	—	—	—	—	58	— (Note: "Sit Still, Look Pretty" did not chart on the Swedish Singles Chart, but peaked at number 20 on the Swedish Heatseeker chart.)	RIAA: 2× Platinum; BPI: Silver; RMNZ: Platinum	Daya / Sit Still, Look Pretty
"Words"	2016	— (Note: "Words" did not chart on the Billboard Hot 100, though did peak at number 31 on the Mainstream Top 40 chart.)	—	— (Note: "Words" did not chart on the Canadian Hot 100, though did peak at number 43 on the CHR/Top 40 chart.)	—	—	—	—	—	—	—		Sit Still, Look Pretty
"New"	2017	— (Note: "New" did not chart on the Billboard Hot 100, though did peak at number 34 on the Mainstream Top 40 chart.)	—	—	—	—	—	—	—	90	—	RIAA: Gold; ARIA: Platinum; RMNZ: Gold	Non-album singles
"Safe"	2018	—	—	—	—	—	—	—	—	—	—		Non-album singles
"Insomnia"	2019	—	—	—	—	79	—	12	— (Note: "Insomnia" did not enter the NZ Top 40 Singles Chart, but peaked at number 22 on the NZ Hot Singles Chart.)	—	—		Non-album singles
"Forward Motion"	2019	—	—	—	—	—	—	—	—	—	—		Late Night
"Left Me Yet"	2019	—	—	—	—	—	—	—	—	—	—		Non-album single
"Keeping It in the Dark"	2019	—	—	—	—	—	—	—	— (Note: "Keeping It in the Dark" did not enter the NZ Top 40 Singles Chart, but peaked at number 27 on the NZ Hot Singles Chart.)	—	—		13 Reasons Why: Season 3 (A Netflix Original Series Soundtrack)
"Wanted" (with NOTD)	2019	—	—	—	—	—	—	—	— (Note: "Wanted" did not enter the NZ Top 40 Singles Chart, but peaked at number 40 on the NZ Hot Singles Chart.)	—	—		Non-album single
"Older" (with Shallou)	2020	—	—	—	—	—	—	—	—	—	—		Magical Thinking
"First Time"	2020	—	—	—	—	—	—	—	— (Note: "First Time" did not enter the NZ Top 40 Singles Chart, but peaked at number 40 on the NZ Hot Singles Chart.)	—	—		The Difference
"Bad Girl"	2021	— (Note: "Bad Girl" did not chart on the Billboard Hot 100, though did peak at number 27 on the Mainstream Top 40 chart.)	—	— (Note: "Bad Girl" did not chart on the Canadian Hot 100, though it did peak at number 48 on the CHR/Top 40 chart.)	—	—	—	—	—	—	—		The Difference
"Montana"	2021	—	—	—	—	—	—	—	—	—	—		The Difference
"What If I Told You"	2021	—	—	—	—	—	—	—	—	—	—		Non-album single
"Evil"	2021	—	—	—	—	—	—	—	—	—	—		Blade Runner: Black Lotus
"Love You When You're Gone"	2022	—	—	—	—	—	—	—	—	—	—		In Between Dreams
"Her"	2022	—	—	—	—	—	—	—	—	—	—		In Between Dreams
"Love You More" (with Felix Cartal)	2023	—	—	—	—	—	—	—	—	—	—		Non-album singles
"Juliene"	2023	—	—	—	—	—	—	—	—	—	—		Non-album singles
"Downtown"	2023	—	—	—	—	—	—	—	—	—	—		Non-album singles
"Heart Over Mind" (with Alan Walker)	2023	—	—	—	—	—	—	—	—	—	—		Walkerworld
"Don't Call"	2024	—	—	—	—	—	—	—	—	—	—		Non-album single
"Infrared"	2025	—	—	—	—	—	—	—	—	—	—		Til Every Petal Drops
"Demise"	2025	—	—	—	—	—	—	—	—	—	—		Til Every Petal Drops
"Agnostic"	2025	—	—	—	—	—	—	—	—	—	—		Til Every Petal Drops
"Bandit"	2025	—	—	—	—	—	—	—	—	—	—		Til Every Petal Drops
"What It Feels Like" (with Dillon Francis)	2026	—	—	—	—	—	—	—	—	—	—		
"Ritual" (with Icona Pop)	2026	—	—	—	—	—	—	—	—	—	—		
"—" denotes a recording that did not chart or was not released in that territory.

=== As featured artist ===
List of singles, with year released, selected chart positions and certifications, and album name shown
Title	Year	Peak chart positions										Certifications	Album
Title	Year	US	US Dance	AUS	CAN	ITA	NLD	NOR	NZ	SWE	UK	Certifications	Album
"Don't Let Me Down" (The Chainsmokers featuring Daya)	2016	3	1	3	4	9	5	5	4	5	2	RIAA: 12× Platinum; ARIA: 9× Platinum; BPI: 4× Platinum; FIMI: 6× Platinum; IFPI DEN: 2× Platinum; GLF: 6× Platinum; MC: 9× Platinum; RMNZ: 7× Platinum	Collage
"Feel Good" (Gryffin and Illenium featuring Daya)	2017	—	17	—	—	—	—	—	— (Note: "Feel Good" did not enter the NZ Top 40 Singles Chart, but peaked at number 6 on the NZ Heatseekers chart.)	—	—	RIAA: Platinum; ARIA: Platinum; RMNZ: Platinum	Awake
"I Wanna Know" (RL Grime featuring Daya)	2018	—	19	—	—	—	—	—	—	—	—	RMNZ: Gold	Nova
"Dreamin'" (Dom Dolla featuring Daya)	2025	—	5	33	—	—	—	—	—	—	—	ARIA: Platinum	Non-album single
"Paradise" (LMNT 115 featuring Daya)	2025	—	—	—	—	—	—	—	—	—	—		
"—" denotes a recording that did not chart or was not released in that territory.

=== Promotional singles ===
List of promotional singles, showing year released and album name
Title	Year	Album
"Cool"	2016	Sit Still, Look Pretty
"Santa Claus Is Coming to Town" (DNCE featuring various artists)	2016	Non-album charity single

== Music videos ==
List of music videos, showing year released and directors
Title	Year	Other artist(s)	Director(s)	Ref.
As lead artist
"Hide Away"	2015	None		
"Hide Away" (International version)	2016	None	Armen Soudjian	
"Sit Still, Look Pretty"	2016	None	Chan Andrè	
"New"	2017	None	Tobias Nathan	
"Safe"	2018	None		
"Insomnia"	2019	None	Nick Harwood	
"Left Me Yet"	2019	None	Symone Ridgell	
"Older"	2020	Shallou	Emma Higgins	
"First Time"	2020	None		
"Bad Girl"	2021	None		
"Montana"	2021	None		
"Love You When You're Gone"	2022	None		
"Her"	2022	None		
"See You in My Dreams"	2022	None	2023	
As featured artist
"Don't Let Me Down"	2016	The Chainsmokers	Marcus Kuhne	
"Feel Good"	2017	Gryffin & Illenium		
"I Wanna Know"	2018	RL Grime	Megan Park	
