= Nova (RL Grime album) =

Studio album by RL Grime
- Released: July 27, 2018
- Recorded: 2015–2017
- Genres: Future bass; electronic dance music
- Length: 55:17
- Label: WeDidIt
- Producers: RL Grime; Diplo (exec.); Skrillex; King Henry; Boys Noize; Americo; Nonsens; Graves; Boaz Van De Beatz; Dan Nigro; Cardiak

RL Grime chronology
Void (2014)	Nova (2018)	Play (2023)

Singles from Nova
- 1. "I Wanna Know" Released: March 16, 2018; 2. "Undo" Released: June 13, 2018; 3. "Pressure" Released: July 11, 2018; 4. "Light Me Up" Released: July 25, 2018

Nova is the second studio album by American trap music producer RL Grime, who is also known as Henry Steinway. It was released by American record label WeDidIt on July 27, 2018. The album consists of 15 songs, which include collaborations with Miguel, Julia Michaels, Chief Keef, Ty Dolla Sign, 24HRS, Joji and Jeremy Zucker.

Nova incorporates four distinct genres: bass, hip-hop, dance-pop, and R&B. Steinway themed the album on the ideas of growth and transition, and named it after his visions of a nova expanding limitlessly. Four singles were released in promotion; "I Wanna Know" featuring American singer Daya, "Undo" featuring Jeremih and Tory Lanez, "Pressure", and "Light Me Up" featuring Miguel and Julia Michaels.

A tour ran in November 2018 for Nova. Upon release, the album received generally mixed to positive reviews from music critics, with them noting the appeal to mainstream audiences, while drawing comparisons to Steinway's previous studio album, Void. It peaked at number one on the US Billboard Dance/Electronic Albums, with first-week sales of 6,000 units, while reaching number 50 on the Australian Albums chart.

== Background and release ==
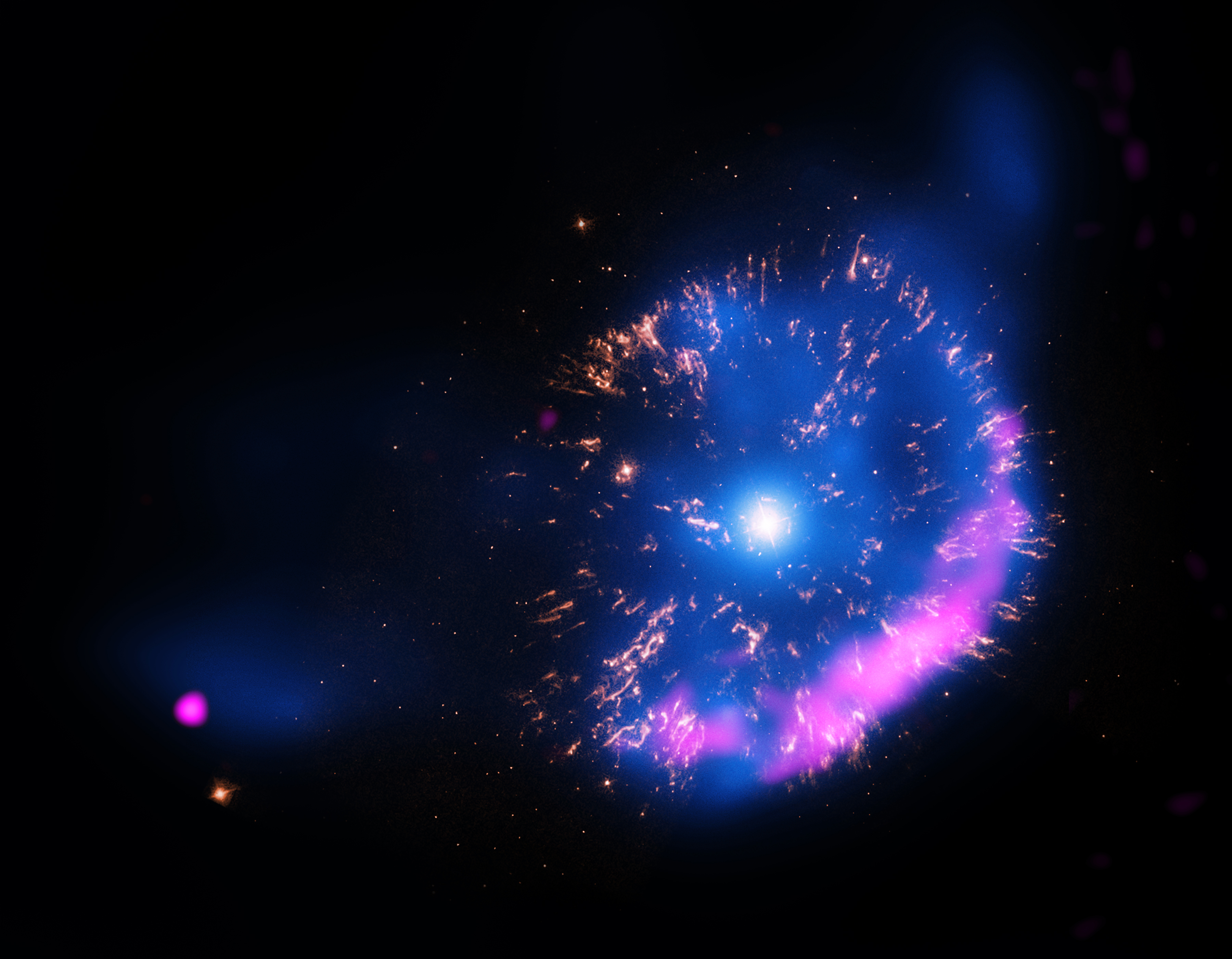
Steinway based the album's concept on an ever-expanding nova.

In 2016, Steinway announced via Snapchat that he had started production on a successor to the previous album Void, released under the alias of RL Grime. Reddit user Anitsirk posted a picture of a purported 11-song tracklist of the album on several printed sheets of paper compared to the 15 on the ultimately released album. Several songs, including "Reims", "Aurora", and "Because of U" were assumed to be included on the album but only "Reims" was eventually released on it. On May 30, 2017, Steinway announced that his second studio album was slated to be titled Nova. On June 13, 2018, he announced the release date for the album as July 27, 2018. Nova was released on digital download stores and streaming services through WeDidIt on July 27, 2018. After its official release, Steinway announced his Australian Nova Tour, which ran from November 2 to 10, 2018. Steinway said the album's concept came from "obsessive ideation on growth and on transition", explaining it as a vision he had of a nova no bigger than a person, launching from the Earth into outer space and expanding endlessly until its light was all we could see.

Following the release of Nova, Steinway revealed through Instagram that he had suffered from depression, anxiety and motivational issues from 2015 to 2017. He decided to reflect the music on his life situation and went on to create "melancholy", but "hopeful" sounding songs. Several songs such as "Shrine", "Light Me Up", "Take It Away", "OMG", and "UCLA" were made as song demos as early as 2015; all of these songs were later fully produced and released as part of the album. Steinway said "Feel Free", one of the last songs produced for Nova, was the "perfect opener". "Shrine" was one of the oldest songs that was produced; Steinway played an instrumental version of the track in his earlier festival sets. He asked British singer-songwriter Freya Ridings to provide vocals for the track. "Take It Away" was initially written in Rio de Janeiro, Brazil, where political protests that occurred between festivals outside of Steinway's hotel forced him to remain inside for days, an experience he disliked. He used the time to produce the track.

Nova is mainly consisted of future bass and trap-influenced electronic dance music, with influences from bass music, dance-pop, R&B, hip-hop and drum and bass. Several songs have been prominently categorised into a single genre such as "Reims" and "Undo", which were identified as future bass and hip-hop, respectively.

On December 3, 2018, Steinway announced that twenty-one remixes were planned to be released as part of two separate remix albums, with the release dates also being announced as December 7 for the first volume, and December 14 for the second. Steinway had previously teased the remixes in a tweet around three months before release. In a tweet, he released a teaser video compromising of a list of artists who had remixes to be featured on both volumes, including 1788-L, K?d, Said the Sky, and Valentino Khan. Although the remix artist list was confirmed, what songs they remixed were not fully listed, with only some being announced including 1788-L's remix of "Era", Myrne's remix of "OMG" and K?d's remix of "Rainer".

== Singles ==
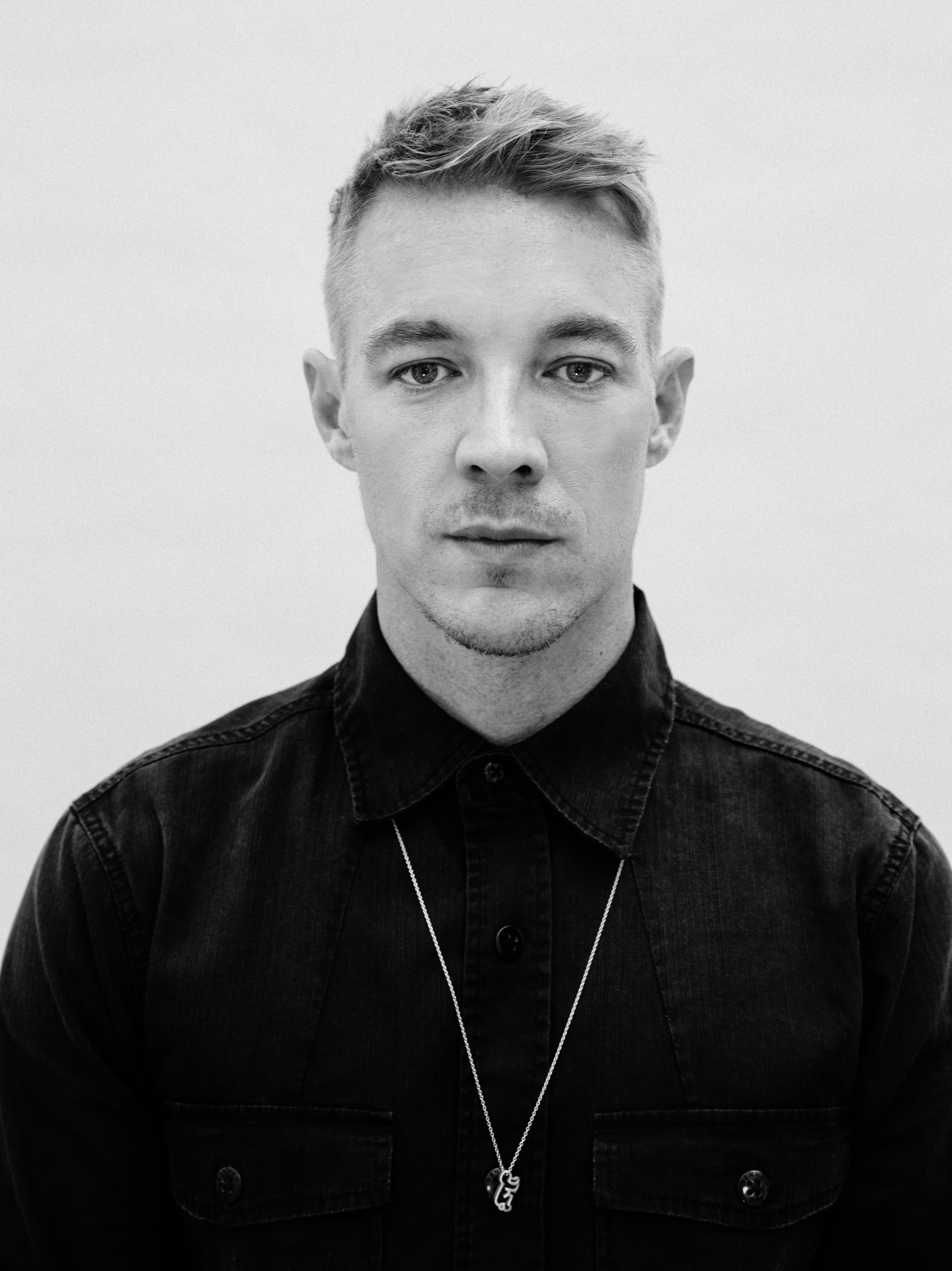
Diplo (pictured) was an executive producer on the album.

"I Wanna Know" was released as lead single from Nova on March 16, 2018. In a press release, Steinway said he brought in Daya to sing on the song and that they first met when he helped her produce her single "New". He said she has an "incredibly unique and powerful voice, so when I first made the song I knew she'd be perfect for it". Daya said about the production of the music video, "I love the angle that Megan took on the messaging of the song; she took the desperation and hopelessness of the lyrics and spun them into more of an empowering feel through the gathering of supportive females in the space ... excited for the world to see". To further promote the album's release, a music video for the single was released on May 30, 2018, through Daya's YouTube channel. Steinway, in conjunction with Dancing Astronaut and WAVO.me, organized a remix competition for "I Wanna Know" on June 4, 2018; the grand prize consisted of a lifetime WAVO Pro membership and a Nova merchandise capsule. New York duo noclue was announced as the winner; they produced a remix described as a "lighthearted, feel-good rendition of the popular 'Nova' track".

Writing for MTV News, Sydney Gore wrote that "I Wanna Know" explored new territory and that the song may not be "what longtime fans of the producer would probably expect from him, but the heartfelt tune presents a new opportunity of growth". Billboard's Kat Bein described the song as Steinway's "poppiest tune to date", noting the mix between his notable style of trap music with dance-pop-like electric guitar and catchy hooks. Jordan Mafi of Nest HQ described the song as both "radio-friendly and akin to forward-thinking", writing that it "soaks up the atmosphere around you, submerging you into a pool of nostalgia you didn't know you even had inside of you". Your EDM's Matthew Meadow noted the song's "exceptional" use of Daya's vocals; he called it "certainly disappointing to some fans" because the track was produced as a future bass track rather than as a "heavy trap banger".

"Undo", which features Jeremih and Tory Lanez, was released as the second single on June 13, 2018. The album's tracklist and release date were announced together on the same day. Meadow called "Undo" one of the more "radio-friendly" singles from the album and "readily accessible for the trappiest of heads". Owen Hurley of Run The Trap described the song as a "super innovative twist on the poppy trap song, making it better for live sets and better to turn up to". Dancing Astronaut's Farrell Sweeney noted the song's fusion of trap and hip-hop, writing; "The track skews hip hop, but Grime manages to infuse his signature electronic style into the song’s drop". Bein labeled the song a "cool, dark dose of trapped-out R&B; that's radio ready, with a playful hook that'll have Grime fans cheering".

"Pressure", co-produced with Boys Noize, was released as the third single on July 11, 2018, with the music video appearing on July 26, 2018 on Steinway's YouTube channel. The song was debuted on Steinway's 2017 Halloween Mix and featured in an Apple iMac Pro commercial on March 14, 2018. Critics described the song as a tribute to Steinway's previous trap anthems in terms of their "intense build-ups" and "heavy drops", comparing it with "Core" and "Tell Me". Bein called the track "absolutely massive", with its "cruel blast of bass and screeching grime".

The album's fourth and final single "Light Me Up" was released on July 25, 2018. It was initially an unused demo by Jack Ü. Diplo—the album's executive producer—shared the demo with Steinway, which Steinway later decided to build upon and have the song's vocals rerecorded because he felt the album required a "summery vibe". Critics commented that the song is more pop-inspired than Steinway's usual productions, and borders on "trap, pop, R&B, and dancehall". Chris Stack from Dancing Astronaut complimented the "cozy synths, comforting bells, and serene percussion elements" present in the song, which sit below Miguel and Julia Michael's "sentimental" vocals.

== Critical reception ==
Professional ratings
Aggregate scores
Source	Rating
Metacritic	57/100
Review scores
Source	Rating
Clash	6/10
Entertainment Weekly	B−
Exclaim!	7/10
The Guardian	3/5 stars
Pitchfork	4.1/10

Nova was met with mixed to positive reviews from music critics. At Metacritic, which assigns a normalized rating out of 100 reviews from mainstream critics, the album received an average score of 57, based on five reviews. Gerrad Hall from Entertainment Weekly described Nova as Steinway's "most mainstream album yet", with Hall praising the title, which he said fits the overall vibe of the album, calling it a "bright star packed with vivid, undeniable energy ... one that sets the stage for the DJ-producer's consistently evolving sound". Hall picked "Light Me Up", which he said is reminiscent of "Closer" by The Chainsmokers, as the album's highlight. Writing for Exclaim!, Dylan Barnabe praised the album, stating that "at the heart of Nova lies Steinway's raw talent for musicality", and that the album was bound to resonate with audiences worldwide.

Lauren Martin of The Guardian said that the album seems to aim for what American journalist John Seabrook described in his book The Song Machine as "The bliss point – where rhythm, sound, melody and harmony converge to create a single ecstatic moment". Martin also wrote that Nova's beats are "decidedly less concerned with trap", and that it is likely to "bring teenage EDM fans with a sweet tooth for beefed-up Top 40 rap bangers together, in head-shaking, fist-pumping ecstasy". Meadow compared Nova to Steinway's previous album Void, describing the difference as night and day, and stating; "Void carried with it an exceedingly dark undertone, exemplified in some of its bigger tracks like 'Core' and 'Scylla'. In contrast, Nova is a brighter, purer expression of happiness if we’ve ever seen one". Meadow also called the album "truly peak RL, as the 27-year-old producer ventures into new sounds and personal expressions, many of which we've never heard from him before". Grace Fleisher from Dancing Astronaut labeled the album as "an effort that channels the sheer potential for [trap's] production future while also providing a range of sounds that harken back to the early material that drove [Steinway's] project in the beginning", and said the beats were "less concerned with trap than they used to be" and more "fitting for the US festival circuit".

In a mixed review, Matthew Cooper from Clash wrote that Nova "can feel like an overbearing assault on the senses" with its lengthy tracklist and "finds its sweet spots" when the "high profile" guest features are dropped and "Steinway's ear for production takes the spotlight". Cooper criticized Steinway's "hindering" efforts to "keep everyone happy" by producing tracks which are "too concerned with doing too much within one song", which was also an issue in his previous album Void. Larry Fitzmaurice of Pitchfork also criticized Steinway's identity ambiguity, writing; "The sonic makeup of Nova is split between nasty bass workouts and straightforward pop, but Steinway seems incapable of distinguishing himself as a producer in either mode". Fitzmaurice commented on the generic song structure of "Light Me Up", saying the song "could’ve come from any EDM mega-producer over the last decade". He selected "I Wanna Know" as the album's "brightest moment", and was satisfied it "sounds like it could've easily come from the pop pariahs’ songbook, with jackpot synths yo-yoing on the chorus and effervescent drums splashing against its backdrop".

== Commercial performance ==
In the United States, Nova debuted at number one on the 'Billboard Dance/Electronic Albums chart, with first-week sales of 6,000 units, 1,000 of which were in traditional album sales. The album also debuted at number 140 on the US Billboard 200, number four on the Billboard Heatseekers Albums chart, and number 19 on the Billboard Independent Albums chart. Elsewhere, Nova debuted at number 50 on the Australian Albums chart. The album singles "Light Me Up", "Undo" and "I Wanna Know" debuted at number 18, 22 and 19 on the US Billboard Dance/Electronic Digital Songs chart, respectively. "I Wanna Know" peaked at number 13 on the Billboard Dance/Mix Show Airplay chart and number six on the Dance/Electronic Digital Song Sales chart. Both "Light Me Up" and "Undo" debuted at number 12 on the latter chart.

== Track listing ==
Credits adapted from Tidal.

Digital download
No.	Title	Writer(s)	Producer(s)	Length
1.	"Feel Free"	RL Grime	Grime	4:12
2.	"Shrine" (featuring Freya Ridings)	Grime; Melissa Whiskey; John Newman; Amish Patel	Grime; ADP	4:43
3.	"Light Me Up" (featuring Miguel and Julia Michaels)	Grime; King Henry; Julia Michaels; Diplo; Miguel; Jorge Medina; Americo Garcia; Skrillex	Grime; Diplo; Boombox Cartel; Skrillex; Max Borghetti; King Henry	3:21
4.	"Undo" (featuring Jeremih and Tory Lanez)	Grime; Thomas Kessler; Cardiak; Noah Beresin; Pentz; Jeremih; Hitmaka; Tory Lanez; Imran Abbas	Grime; Abaz; Diplo; Xplosive; Yung Berg; Noah Breakfast; Cardiak	3:28
5.	"Take It Away" (featuring Ty Dolla Sign and TK Kravitz)	Christian Mochizuki; Tevin Keari Maurice Thompson; Darcie; Ty Dolla $ign; Riley Keating; Conor Alu	Grime; Graves	3:56
6.	"OMG" (featuring Joji and Chief Keef)	Grime; Pentz; Boaz van de Beatz; Chief Keef; George Miller; Starrah	Grime; Boaz Van De Beatz; Diplo	3:18
7.	"Shoulda"	Grime; Keyshia Cole; Rodney Jerkins; James Harmon Stack; Aminia Harris	Grime; Jim E Stack	3:52
8.	"Reims"	Grime; Mochizuki; Garcia	Grime; Americo; Graves	3:55
9.	"Pressure"	Grime; Boys Noize	Grime; Boys Noize	3:29
10.	"Era"	Grime; Redman; Jens Espersen; Rasmus Mygind Korsby; Anton Twile Nielsen; Garcia	Grime; Nonsens; Americo	4:09
11.	"Run for Your Life (Interlude)"	Grime	Grime	2:22
12.	"I Wanna Know" (featuring Daya)	Dan Nigro; Cara Salimando	Grime; Myrne; Nigro	3:26
13.	"UCLA" (featuring 24hrs)	Grime; Espersen; Korsby; Nielsen; Rex Masamune Kudo; Nigro; Ryan Vojtesak; Noah Sanford Mays Gersh; Robert Davis	Grime; Charlie Handsome; Rex Kudo; Noah Gersh; Nigro; Nonsens	3:12
14.	"Rainer"	Grime; Mochizuki	Grime; Graves	4:06
15.	"Atoms" (featuring Jeremy Zucker)	Grime; Salimando; Gersh; Nigro; Jeremy Scott Zucker; Cass Lowe	Grime; Gersh; Lowe; Nigro	3:48
Total length:				55:17

== Personnel ==
Credits adapted from Qobuz.

Technical and composing credits

- Henry Steinway – production, writing (all tracks)
- John Newman – writing (2)
- ADP – production (2)
- Amish Patel – writing (2)
- Freya Ridings – production (2)
- Miguel – production, writing (3)
- Diplo – executive producer, writing (3, 4, 6)
- Skrillex – production (3)
- Julia Michaels – writing, production (3)
- King Henry – production, writing (3)
- Jorge Medina – production, writing (3)
- Americo Garcia – writing (3, 8, 10)
- Xplosive – production, writing (4)
- Abaz – production, writing (4)
- Yung Berg – production, writing (4)
- Jeremih – production, writing (4)
- Cardiak – production, writing (4)
- Tory Lanez – production, writing (4)
- Noah Breakfast – production (4)
- Graves – production, writing (5, 8, 14)
- Ty Dolla Sign – production, writing (5)
- TK Kravitz – production (5)
- Conor Alu – writing (5)
- Darcie – writing (5)
- Tevin Keari Maurice Thompson – writing (5)
- Riley Keating – writing (5)
- George Miller – writing (6)
- Chief Keef – production (6)
- Boaz van de Beatz – production, writing (6)
- Brittany Talia Hazzard – writing (6)
- Rodney Jerkins – writing (7)
- James Harmon Stack – writing (7)
- Keyshia Cole – writing (7)
- Jim E Stack – production (7)
- Boys Noize – production, writing (9)
- Reggie Noble – writing (10)
- Nonsens – production, writing (10, 13)
- Dan Nigro – production, writing (12, 13, 15)
- Cara Salimando – writing (12, 15)
- Myrne – production (12)
- Daya – production (12)
- Robert Davis – writing, production (13)
- Noah Gersh – production (13, 15)
- Ryan Vojtesak – writing (13)
- Rex Kudo – production (13)
- Charlie Handsome – production (13)
- Cass Lowe – production, writing (15)
- Jeremy Zucker – production (15)

== Charts ==
Chart (2018)	Peak position
Australian Albums (ARIA)	50
US Billboard 200	140
US Heatseekers Albums (Billboard)	4
US Independent Albums (Billboard)	19
US Top Dance/Electronic Albums (Billboard)	1

== Release history ==
Region	Date	Format	Label	Ref.
Various	July 27, 2018	Digital download, Vinyl	WeDidIt	
