= Jaime Vélez =

Jaime Velez may refer to:

- Jaime P. Velez, American recording engineer Don't Let Me Down (The Chainsmokers song)
- Jaime Velez (Oz), a fictional character from the television series Oz
