= Radio Disney Music Award for Breakout Artist =

Annual US music award

The following is a list of Radio Disney Music Award winners and nominees for Breakout Artist.

== Winners and nominees ==
=== 2010s ===
Year	Winner	Nominees	Ref.
2013	Austin Mahone	IM5; Ryan Beatty; Cimorelli; Christina Grimmie	
2014	Fifth Harmony	Ariana Grande; Zendaya	
2015	Unrealized		
2016	Tori Kelly	Alessia Cara; Charlie Puth; Rachel Platten	
2017	Alessia Cara	Daya; DNCE; Hailee Steinfeld; Kelsea Ballerini	
2018	Camila Cabello	Charlie Puth; Dua Lipa; Halsey; Julia Michaels; Marshmello	
