= Sit Still, Look Pretty (album) =

Studio album by Daya
- Released: October 7, 2016
- Recorded: 2015–16
- Length: 47:54
- Labels: Z; Artbeatz; RED
- Producers: Jonas Jeberg; Scott Bruzenak; Jaime P. Velez

Daya chronology
| Daya (2015) | Sit Still, Look Pretty (2016) | The Difference (2021) |

Singles from Sit Still, Look Pretty
- 1. "Hide Away" Released: April 22, 2015; 2. "Sit Still, Look Pretty" Released: March 29, 2016; 3. "Words" Released: November 15, 2016

Sit Still, Look Pretty is the debut studio album by American singer Daya. It was released on October 7, 2016, through Z Entertainment, Artbeatz, and RED Distribution. All of the songs from her EP, Daya, are included in the album.

== Background and recording ==
In 2015, Daya was still a junior in high school when her career began to take off, scoring a major hit with "Don't Let Me Down", a collaboration with the Chainsmokers. While developing Sit Still, Look Pretty, she continued working with several collaborators from her early releases, including songwriter Gino Barletta and producer Scott Bruzenak. In an interview with Billboard, Daya said she had initially entered writing sessions intending to pitch songs to other artists, but the response to her vocals on "Hide Away" led her to pursue the material for herself. In a statement, Daya described the album as "the most authentic representation of me as an artist so far", adding that she had spent nearly a year working on the project and that each song reflected a personal part of her. She also said it felt "surreal" to be releasing her debut album after the support she had received during the previous year.

Recording for the album began in November 2015, shortly after the release of Daya's debut EP, Daya. She continued collaborating with several of the same co-writers from that project, working intermittently between tour dates. Sessions were held in Los Angeles over the following months, with most of the material completed by July 2016.

== Release and promotion ==
"Hide Away" was released as the lead single from the album on April 22, 2015. Since its release, it has peaked at number 23 on the Billboard Hot 100, and has been certified Platinum by the RIAA. "Sit Still, Look Pretty" was first released on September 4 as the promotional single, later released to Top 40 radio as the second single from the album on March 29, 2016. It has since peaked at number 28 on the Hot 100, and has been certified Platinum by the RIAA.

Daya announced Sit Still, Look Pretty on August 30. "Cool" was released as the first and only promotional single on September 29, receiving positive feedback from critics and fans alike. "Words" was released to Top 40 radio as the third single from the album on November 15.

== Critical reception ==
Professional ratings
Review scores
| Source | Rating |
|---|---|
| AllMusic | 3.5/5 stars |
| Rolling Stone | 2/5 stars |

Upon release, Sit Still, Look Pretty received mixed reviews from critics. Writing for Rolling Stone, Brittany Spanos described the album as being "not especially unique", but noted that Daya's performance on the lead single, as well has her collaboration with the Chainsmokers on "Don't Let Me Down", "made her a surprisingly soulful leader of a new kind of bubblegum". In a more positive review, AllMusic gave the album a three and a half star rating, writing that the LP "offers a fun and youthful alternative to the smokier shades of the post-Lorde alt-pop landscape".

== Track listing ==
Standard edition
| No. | Title | Writer(s) | Producer(s) | Length |
|---|---|---|---|---|
| 1. | "Dare" | Gino Barletta; Scott Bruzenak; Denise Carite; Grace Tandon; Jonas Jeberg | Bruzenak; Jeberg; Barletta | 3:29 |
| 2. | "Legendary" | Barletta; Bruzenak; Brett McLaughlin; Britten Newbill; Kara Rantovich | Bruzenak; Barletta | 3:24 |
| 3. | "I.C.Y.M.I." | Barletta; Bruzenak; Jeberg; McLaughlin | Jeberg | 3:22 |
| 4. | "Thirsty" | Barletta; Bruzenak; McLaughlin; Newbill | Bruzenak; Barletta | 3:19 |
| 5. | "Love of My Life" | Barletta; Chloe Angelides; McLaughlin; Michael Fonseca; Shane van Luntern; Teal Douville | Douville; Omega | 3:11 |
| 6. | "Hide Away" | Tandon; Barletta; Bruzenak; McLaughlin; Newbill | Bruzenak; Barletta | 3:12 |
| 7. | "Cool" | Barletta; Bruzenak; McLaughlin; Newbill | Bruzenak; Barletta | 3:34 |
| 8. | "Sit Still, Look Pretty" | Barletta; Bruzenak; Mike Campbell; Newbill | Bruzenak; Barletta | 3:22 |
| 9. | "Talk" | Barletta; Douville; Fonseca; Newbill | Douville; Omega | 3:01 |
| 10. | "U12" | Barletta; Bruzenak; McLaughlin; Newbill | Bruzenak; Barletta | 3:23 |
| 11. | "Words" | Barletta; Melanie Fontana; Jeberg | Jeberg | 3:32 |
| 12. | "Back to Me" | Tandon; Barletta; John Lock; McLaughlin; Newbill; Jaime P. Velez | Barletta; Velez | 4:01 |
| 13. | "Got the Feeling" | Barletta; Lukas Loules; McLaughlin | Loules | 3:37 |
| 14. | "We Are" | Barletta; Tandon; Bruzenak; Newbill | Bruzenak; Jeberg | 3:27 |
| Total length: | | | | 47:54 |

Target and Japan bonus tracks
| No. | Title | Writer(s) | Producer(s) | Length |
|---|---|---|---|---|
| 15. | "Credit" | Barletta; McLaughlin; Bruzenak; Tandon; Newbill | Douville | 3:36 |
| 16. | "Next Plane Out" | Barletta; McLaughlin; Bruzenak; Tandon | Bruzenak | 3:41 |
| 17. | "All Right" | | Douville; Omega | 3:29 |
| Total length: | | | | 58:40 |

== Charts ==
| Chart (2016) | Peak position |
|---|---|
| Canadian Albums (Billboard) | 40 |
| US Billboard 200 | 36 |

== Certifications ==
| Region | Certification | Certified units/sales |
|---|---|---|
| New Zealand (RMNZ) | Gold | 7,500^{‡} |
| United States (RIAA) | Gold | 500,000^{‡} |
^{‡} Sales+streaming figures based on certification alone.
