= RL Grime =

American DJ and producer (born 1991)

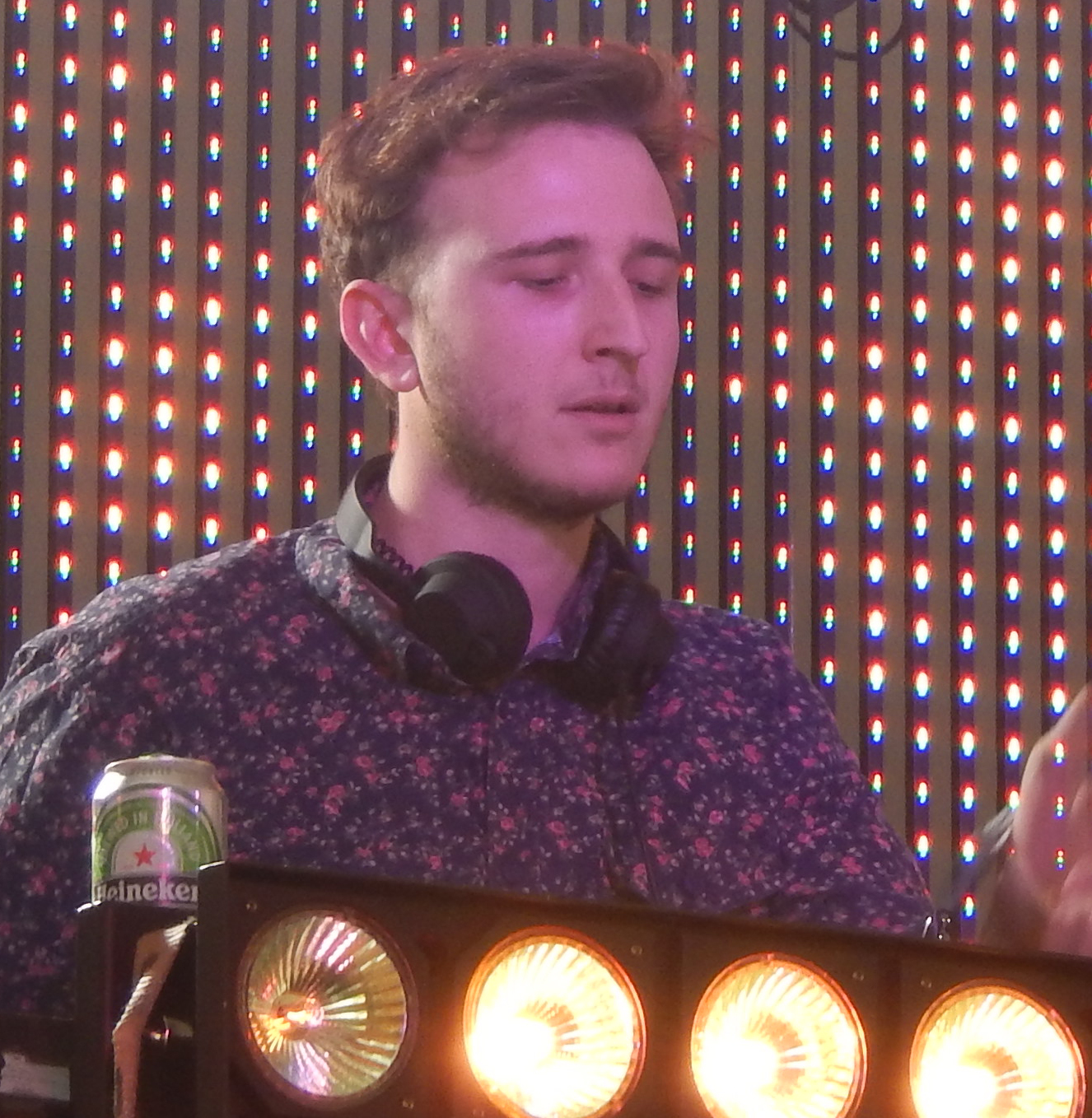
- RL Grime in 2018

Background information
- Also known as: Clockwork (2011–2014)
- Born: Henry Alfred Steinway; February 8, 1991 (age 35); Los Angeles, California, U.S.
- Origin: Los Angeles, California, U.S.
- Genres: Trap, future bass, drum and bass (as RL Grime); Electro house, big room house, Dutch house (as Clockwork)
- Occupations: Record producer; DJ
- Years active: 2011–present
- Labels: WeDidIt, Sable Valley, Fool's Gold, Mad Decent, Dim Mak
- Website: rlgri.me

Henry Alfred Steinway (born February 8, 1991), better known by his stage name RL Grime, (previously known as Clockwork) is an American record producer and DJ. RL Grime specializes in trap and bass music and is a member of the Los Angeles electronic music collective WeDidIt. His debut Grapes EP was released in April 2012 on WeDidIt. RL Grime premiered a popular Halloween mix in October 2012, which have continued to be released annually through 2023. His follow-up EP High Beams was released in July 2013 on Fool's Gold Records, which debuted at No. 8 on Billboard's Dance/Electronic Albums chart, and No. 1 on the iTunes Electronic Chart. RL Grime has produced remixes for Benny Benassi, Chief Keef, Jamie Lidell, and Shlohmo. His second studio album, Nova, was released in 2018. In February 2019, RL Grime announced the founding of his record label Sable Valley.

== Early life ==
Steinway was born in Los Angeles, California to his mother who worked in photography, and to his father who worked in architecture. His grandfather was Henry Z. Steinway, the last family owner of piano company Steinway & Sons. In spite of his family's history with musical instruments, Steinway says he "didn't really grow up with much music in (his) childhood" and that none of his family were musicians.

Steinway enrolled at Northeastern University in Boston, Massachusetts, with a focus in music business. In 2010 after his first year, he transferred from Northeastern to New York University, majoring in music business. In 2012, Steinway moved back to Los Angeles and currently resides there.

== Music career ==
In 2011, RL Grime joined the WeDidIt collective with fellow Los Angeles-born producers Shlohmo, Groundislava, and D33J. In April 2012, he released his debut release on the WeDidIt label, the Grapes EP, featuring four original tracks and remixes from Shlohmo, Salva, and LOL Boys.

In June 2012, RL Grime teamed up with producer Salva for a remix of Kanye West's "Mercy", which has garnered over eight million plays on SoundCloud and was called by The Fader "just massive, as if hail and tsunami waves were both byproducts of bass." In December 2012, RL Grime remixed Benny Benassi's song "Satisfaction", which gained over one million SoundCloud streams and charted in the top five on the Beatport electro house chart.

In October 2012, RL Grime released his first Halloween Mix, featuring original songs and remixes of popular tracks, along with vocal drops from celebrities. These mixes have been widely popular, and have continued to drop annually through 2024. Each mix has included vocal cameos from celebrities such as Tony Hawk, Pharrell Williams, Hannibal Buress, Shaquille O'Neal, Guy Fieri, T-Pain, Neil deGrasse Tyson, Bruce Buffer, Jack Black, and author R.L. Stine, whose name RL Grime derives from.

In July 2013, RL Grime released his High Beams EP on Fool's Gold Records, a five-track EP featuring producer Salva and Los Angeles, California rapper Problem. The EP debuted at No. 1 on the iTunes Electronic Chart, and No. 8 on Billboard's Dance/Electronic Albums chart.

RL Grime collaborated with like-minded producer Baauer on the track "Infinite Daps" in November 2013. Both producers toured together throughout July and August 2013, along with Ryan Hemsworth and Jim-E Stack.

His debut studio album, Void, was released on November 14, 2014. It featured guest appearances from Big Sean and Boys Noize among others.

On May 30, 2017, RL Grime announced his second studio album, Nova. The album was released on July 27, 2018, through WeDidIt Records, and featured collaborations with Miguel, Julia Michaels, Chief Keef, Ty Dolla Sign, 24HRS and Joji. The album's lead single, "I Wanna Know", was released on March 16, 2018, followed by "Undo" on June 13, 2018, and "Pressure" on July 11, 2018. Commenting on the album's concept, Henry stated: "NOVA' came from obsessive ideation on growth and on transition. The art and stories and the moments that inspired me through this record tend to explore this as well. The feeling of leaving behind what was, and of welcoming the foreign. Throughout the process, I had this vision of a 'nova' or of a star no bigger than a person launching from earth into outer space and expanding endlessly until its light was all that we could see. That's the feeling I get from these records, infinite light." The album's last single, "Light Me Up", which featured the vocals of Miguel and Julia Michaels, was released on July 25, 2018. Initially an unused Jack Ü demo which was shown to Grime by Diplo, Grime decided to build the demo out and have Miguel's and Michaels' vocals recut, since he felt that the album required a "summery vibe" to it.

Henry announced the founding of his record label Sable Valley in February 2019 stating, 'Since the inception of RL Grime, I’ve had this goal in the back of my mind to start my own label. My Halloween mixes have always been an outlet for me to curate and showcase new music, but the natural next step for me was to start a label. My whole life I’ve been obsessed with the process of searching for and finding what's next, and this is a way for me to use platform to highlight emerging talent that I believe in. "Arcus" is the first release, and it felt like the perfect son to set the tone for what Sable Valley is about". In a following statement Sable Valley announced, "During your membership here at Sable Valley, we strive to provide you with the technical information, advocacy, and professional opportunities to help advance your overall well-being. As a member, you will be able to exchange research information with other Sable Valley affiliates and participate in programming sessions offered at various conferences held by Sable Valley throughout the year."

On August 8, 2023, Grime uploaded a video on his YouTube channel, titled PLAY^{RL}, announcing the release of his next album, PLAY, on his label Sable Valley. The album, which was released on 15 September, 2023, was divided into three parts: APEX, GRID and RUSH. The album features collaborations with the likes of JAWNS, Juelz, ISOxo, Montell2099, EMELINE, 1nonly, Reo Cragun, Bea Miller, 070 Shake, Sublab, Noomi and Baauer.

== Discography ==
=== Albums ===
- Void (2014, WeDidIt)
- Nova (2018, WeDidIt)
- Nova (The Remixes, Vol. 1) (2018, WeDidIt)
- Nova (The Remixes, Vol. 2) (2018, WeDidIt)
- Nova Pure (2019, WeDidIt)
- Play (2023, Sable Valley)

=== Extended plays ===
- Ayoo / Think (2011, DirtyNitrus) (as Clockwork)
- Clipz (2011)
- Squad Up (2012, Dim Mak) (as Clockwork)
- Grapes (2012, WeDidIt)
- Titan (2012, Mad Decent) (as Clockwork)
- High Beams (2013, Fools Gold Records)

=== Singles ===
- "Trap on Acid" (2012)
- "Flood" [a.k.a. "Flood the Block"] (2012)
- "Because of U" (2013)
- "Blitz" (2013) (as Clockwork)
- "Infinite Daps" (with Baauer) (2013)
- "Tell Me" (with What So Not) (2014)
- "Champion" (2014) (as Clockwork)
- "Infinite Mana" (with Congorock) (2014) (as Clockwork)
- "Core" (2014)
- "Reminder" (with How To Dress Well) (2014)
- "Scylla" (2014)
- "Kingpin" (with Big Sean) (2014)
- "Golden State" (2015)
- "Aurora" (2016)
- "Waiting" (with What So Not and Skrillex) (2016)
- "Reims" (2017)
- "Stay for It" (with Miguel) (2017)
- "Era" (2017)
- "I Wanna Know" (with Daya) (2018)
- "Undo" (featuring Jeremih and Tory Lanez) (2018)
- "Pressure" (2018)
- "Light Me Up" (featuring Miguel and Julia Michaels) (2018)
- "Arcus" (with Graves) (2019)
- "Stinger" (with ISOxo) (2021)
- "Fallaway" (with Baauer as Hærny) (2021)

=== Productions ===
- Pitbull - "I'm Off That", (produced by RL Grime) (2012)
- Tory Lanez – "I-95", (co-produced with Tory Lanez, Noah Breakfast, and Grave Goods) from "Lost Cause" (2014)
- Tory Lanez – "In For It", (produced by RL Grime) (2014)
- Big Sean – "Light It Up" (featuring 2 Chainz) [co-produced by Noah Breakfast] (2016)
- Joji – "Test Drive", (produced by RL Grime) (2018)

=== Remixes ===
- Fat and Ugly – "Indian Giants" (2010)
- Para One – "Nevrosis" (2011)
- Dem Slackers – "Swagger" (2011)
- Chris Brown – "Look at Me Now" (2011)
- Cam'ron – "Hey Ma" (2011)
- Avicii – "Levels" (Clockwork Bootleg) (2011)
- Beastie Boys – "Sabotage" (Clockwork 2012 Bootleg) (2012)
- Joachim Garraud & Alesia – "Hook" (2012)
- Drake – "Over" (2012)
- Drake – "Club Paradise" (2012)
- Felix Cartal featuring Miss Palmer – "Black to White" (2012)
- Autoerotique – "Roll the Drums" (2012)
- Steve Aoki featuring Lil Jon and Chiddy Bang – "Emergency" (2012)
- Kanye West, Big Sean, Pusha T and 2 Chainz – "Mercy" (with Salva) (2012)
- Zedd featuring Matthew Koma – "Spectrum" (with A-Trak) (2012)
- Shlohmo – "The Way U Do" (2012)
- Dimitri Vegas & Like Mike featuring Regi – "Momentum" (2012)
- Congorock featuring Sean Paul – "Bless Di Nation" (2013)
- Benny Benassi & Pink is Punk – "Perfect Storm" (2013)
- Rihanna – "Pour It Up" (2013)
- Benny Benassi presents The Biz – "Satisfaction" (2013)
- Sebastian Ingrosso and Tommy Trash featuring John Martin – "Reload" (2013)
- Jamie Lidell – "What a Shame" (2013)
- Chief Keef – "Love Sosa" (2013)
- Jack Beats featuring Example and Diplo – "War" (2013)
- Kaskade and Project 46 – "Last Chance" (2014)
- Travis Scott and Young Thug – "Skyfall" (with Salva) (2015)
- The Weeknd – "The Hills" (2015)
- Flume – "Never Be Like You X Aurora" (2017)
- G Jones – "In Your Head" (2019)
- Baauer – "Swoopin" (2020)
