= New (Daya song) =

Single by Daya
- Released: October 11, 2017
- Recorded: 2017
- Genre: Electropop
- Length: 3:51
- Label: Daya Records, Interscope
- Songwriters: Grace Tandon; Brett McLaughlin; James Newman; Nolan Lambroza; Tor Erik Hermansen; Mikkel Storleer Eriksen
- Producers: Sir Nolan; StarGate

Daya singles chronology
"Feel Good" (2017)	"New" (2017)	"I Wanna Know" (2018)

Music video
- "New" on YouTube

"New" is a song by American singer Daya. Released on October 11, 2017, it was written by Daya with Brett "Leland" McLaughlin, James Newman, and the producers Sir Nolan and StarGate.

It is the first song to be released under Interscope Records after Daya's split from her independent label Artbeatz.

== Music video ==
The music video was released on October 12, 2017, and was directed by Tobias Nathan.

== Charts ==
Chart (2017–18)	Peak position
Belgium (Ultratip Bubbling Under Flanders)	67
Czech Republic Singles Digital (ČNS IFPI)	88
Latvia (DigiTop100)	83
Philippines (BillboardPH Hot 100)	58
Slovakia Singles Digital (ČNS IFPI)	90
US Pop Airplay (Billboard)	34

== Certifications ==
Region	Certification	Certified units/sales
Australia (ARIA)	Platinum	70,000^{‡}
New Zealand (RMNZ)	Gold	15,000^{‡}
United States (RIAA)	Gold	500,000^{‡}
^{‡} Sales+streaming figures based on certification alone.

== Release history ==
Region	Date	Format	Label	Ref.
Worldwide	October 11, 2017	Digital download	Interscope	
United States	October 17, 2017	Top 40 radio	Interscope	
