= Insomnia (Daya song) =

Single by Daya
- Released: March 8, 2019
- Genre: Trance-pop
- Length: 2:59
- Label: Daya; Interscope
- Songwriters: Grace Tandon; Jacob Kasher Hindlin; Michael Pollack; Oscar Görres
- Producer: Oscar Görres

Daya singles chronology
"Safe" (2018)	"Insomnia" (2019)	"Forward Motion" (2019)

"Insomnia" is a song by American singer Daya, released as a single on March 8, 2019, through Interscope Records. The song was produced by Oscar Görres, and its music video was released on March 26, 2019. It peaked in top 15 in Czech Republic and Norway.

== Background ==
Daya described the song as a "gritty club pop anthem about missing the person you love". She told Billboard that the song is partially about having "serious sleep issues from touring and everything". Along with its meaning of having a "new love interest", the song's "trance music roots are intended to simulate an all-night party and give the song a third meaning", with Daya saying she also wanted to take the song in a "rave direction".

== Critical reception ==
Billboard said the track had "shuddering pop production" and an "oscillating beat", while Idolator called it "one of the best pop songs of 2019" as well as "ruthless catchy and endlessly danceable." Paper described the song as a "nervy, heart-racing bop with a jittery beat (a little reminiscent of "Disturbia") about being unable to sleep without an absent lover".

== Music video ==
The music video was directed by Nick Harwood and released on March 26, 2019. It features Daya sitting on her own in a room of a warehouse while others dance in a different room. Daya is later shown singing in front of the dancing crowd.

== Track listings ==
Digital download
No.	Title	Length
1.	"Insomnia"	3:00

Digital download - Owen Norton Remix
No.	Title	Length
1.	"Insomnia" (Owen Norton Remix)	3:36

Digital download - King Arthur Remix
No.	Title	Length
1.	"Insomnia" (King Arthur Remix)	2:56

Digital download - Devault Remix
No.	Title	Length
1.	"Insomnia" (Devault Remix)	4:26

== Charts ==
Chart (2019)	Peak position
Czech Republic Airplay (ČNS IFPI)	10
Czech Republic Singles Digital (ČNS IFPI)	75
Denmark Digital Songs (Billboard)	10
Greece International Digital Singles (IFPI)	75
Ireland (IRMA)	79
Lithuania (AGATA)	27
New Zealand Hot Singles (RMNZ)	22
Norway (VG-lista)	12

== Release history ==
Region	Date	Format	Label	Ref.
United States	March 8, 2019	Digital download; streaming	Interscope	
United States	June 4, 2019	Top 40 radio	Interscope	
