= Sit Still, Look Pretty =

Single by Daya

from the album Daya and Sit Still, Look Pretty
- Released: March 29, 2016
- Recorded: 2015
- Genre: Synthpop
- Length: 3:20
- Label: Artbeatz; Z; RED
- Songwriters: Gino Barletta; Mike Campbell; Britten Newbill
- Producers: Scott Bruzenak; Barletta

Daya singles chronology
"Hide Away" (2015)	"Sit Still, Look Pretty" (2016)	"Don't Let Me Down" (2016)

Music video
- "Sit Still, Look Pretty" at Vevo

"Sit Still, Look Pretty" is a song by American singer Daya. It was first released on September 4, 2015, as the promotional single from her debut extended play (EP), Daya (2015) and her debut studio album of the same name (2016). It was released as the second single from the latter on March 29, 2016, sent to Top 40 radio station. The song is the follow-up to her Billboard Hot 100 top 40 hit "Hide Away". "Sit Still, Look Pretty" was written by Gino Barletta, Mike Campbell and Britten Newbill. Lyrically, the song includes themes of female empowerment.

"Sit Still, Look Pretty" debuted at number 100 on the Billboard Hot 100, peaking at number 28. It has also charted in Canada, Slovakia, and Czech Republic. A lyric video and music video for the song were released in 2016. The song was nominated for an Ardy at the 2017 Radio Disney Music Awards for Best Song of the Year, and it has also been used in the film Pitch Perfect 3, where actress and singer Hailee Steinfeld provided the lead vocals.

== Background ==
In an interview with Entertainment Weekly, Daya stated "It's about being a girl that goes after her own dreams and really fights for what she wants, and not letting anyone get in the way of that. It's important for young girls to know that they don't have to act a certain way or depend on someone for happiness. They can find all of that within themselves." Daya also said in an interview with Idolator, "I think it's just about not being an accessory for someone else. Just having your own dreams and goals. Going after them and not having to always try to please someone."

== Critical reception ==
Dana Getz of Entertainment Weekly writes it "relegates [good boys] to the sidelines" and further labeled it a "bouncy, eff–you jaunt". Idolator's Mike Wass calls the chorus "empowering" and stated "['Sit Still, Look Pretty'] picks up where 'Hide Away' left off — in that it's a little rebellious and a lot relatable." Billboard ranked "Sit Still, Look Pretty" at number 47 on their "100 Best Pop Songs of 2016" list.

== Music video ==
The lyric video of "Sit Still, Look Pretty" was unveiled on March 6, 2016, and its music video was released on September 9 at MTV.

== Charts ==
=== Weekly charts ===
Chart (2016)	Peak position
Belgium (Ultratip Bubbling Under Flanders)	65
Belgium (Ultratip Bubbling Under Wallonia)	63
Canada Hot 100 (Billboard)	64
Canada CHR/Top 40 (Billboard)	29
Czech Republic Singles Digital (ČNS IFPI)	53
Slovakia Singles Digital (ČNS IFPI)	58
Sweden Heatseeker (Sverigetopplistan)	20
US Billboard Hot 100	28
US Adult Contemporary (Billboard)	20
US Adult Pop Airplay (Billboard)	15
US Dance Airplay (Billboard)	31
US Pop Airplay (Billboard)	8

=== Year-end charts ===
Chart (2016)	Position
US Billboard Hot 100	78
US Mainstream Top 40 (Billboard)	32

== Certifications ==
Region	Certification	Certified units/sales
New Zealand (RMNZ)	Platinum	30,000^{‡}
United Kingdom (BPI)	Silver	200,000^{‡}
United States (RIAA)	2× Platinum	2,000,000^{‡}
^{‡} Sales+streaming figures based on certification alone.

== Release history ==
Region	Date	Format	Label	Ref.
United States	September 4, 2015	Digital download	Artbeatz; Z; RED	
United States	March 29, 2016	Top 40 radio	Artbeatz; Z; RED	
