= I Wanna Know (RL Grime song) =

Single by RL Grime featuring Daya

from the album Nova
- Released: March 16, 2018
- Recorded: 2017
- Length: 3:26
- Label: WeDidit
- Songwriter(s): Henry Steinway; Cara Salimando; Dan Nigro
- Producer(s): RL Grime; Dan Nigro; MYRNE

RL Grime singles chronology
"Era" (2017)	"I Wanna Know" (2018)	"Undo" (2018)

Daya singles chronology
"New" (2017)	"I Wanna Know" (2018)	"Safe" (2018)

Music video
- "I Wanna Know" on YouTube

I Wanna Know is a song by American producer RL Grime. The song features the vocals of American singer Daya, and was released on March 16, 2018, through WeDidit Records.

== Background and composition ==
In an interview, RL Grime stated: "I've been a big fan of Daya from the jump. We first met when I helped produce her latest single, "New", and have been friends since. She has an incredibly unique and powerful voice, so when I first made the song I knew she'd be perfect for it. I sent her the demo, we met up the next day, and she knocked it out the park."

"I Wanna Know" was RL Grime's first release since October 2017 and was the single released from RL Grime's latest album. The album was later released on July 27, 2018.

The song was released to iTunes on March 16, 2018, through WeDidit Records.

== Music video ==
The music video for the song was released to YouTube on Daya's channel on May 30, 2018.

The video was set in the early 1990s, comprising Daya and a group of girls dancing at an old motel. The video was directed by Megan Park and celebrates female empowerment.

In an interview, Daya explains: "I love the angle that Megan took on the messaging of the song; she took the desperation and hopelessness of the lyrics and spun them into more of an empowering feel through the gathering of supportive females in the space. Between that and the obvious early 90s references in the wardrobe and props, I think it was the most colorful and exciting shoot I’ve done to date. Excited for the world to see."

== Track listing ==
Digital download
No.	Title	Length
1.	"I Wanna Know" (RL Grime featuring Daya)	3:26

== Charts ==
=== Weekly charts ===
Chart (2018)	Peak position
US Hot Dance/Electronic Songs (Billboard)	13

=== Year-end charts ===
Chart (2018)	position
US Hot Dance/Electronic Songs (Billboard)	65

== Certifications ==
Certifications for "I Wanna Know
Region	Certification	Certified units/sales
New Zealand (RMNZ)	Gold	15,000^{‡}
^{‡} Sales+streaming figures based on certification alone.

== Release history ==
Region	Date	Format	Label	Ref.
Worldwide	March 16, 2018	Digital download	WeDidit	
