= Feel Good (Gryffin and Illenium song) =

Single by Gryffin and Illenium featuring Daya

from the album Awake
- Released: March 3, 2017
- Recorded: 2016
- Genre: EDM; future bass
- Length: 4:08
- Label: Darkroom; Interscope
- Songwriters: Dan Griffith; Toby Gad; Grace Tandon; Nisha Asnani; Nicholas Miller
- Producers: Gryffin; Illenium

Gryffin singles chronology
"Whole Heart" (2016)	"Feel Good" (2017)	"Love in Ruins" (2017)

Illenium singles chronology
"Fractures" (2017)	"Feel Good" (2017)	"Sound of Walking Away" (2017)

Daya singles chronology
"Words" (2016)	"Feel Good" (2017)	"New" (2017)

Music video
- "Feel Good" on YouTube

"Feel Good" is a song by American DJs Gryffin and Illenium. The song features the vocals of American singer Daya, and was released on March 3, 2017, through Darkroom Records and Interscope Records.

== Background and composition ==
The song was released to iTunes on March 3, 2017, through Interscope Records and Darkroom Records. The song was written by Toby Gad, Grace Tandon and Nisha Asnani and produced by Gryffin and Illenium.

Gryffin explained that he met up with Illenium while on tour in 2016 and together created a sound which ended up not being used for the final song, but featured on "Free Fall" by Illenium. However, Gryffin worked on the track for a few weeks following the tour and invited Daya in to redo her vocals (despite her having a 100 degree fever), leading to the song in its current form.

== Music video ==
The music video for the song was released on April 28, 2017, on Gryffin's Vevo channel on YouTube.

== Track listing ==
Digital download
No.	Title	Length
1.	"Feel Good" (Gryffin and Illenium featuring Daya)	4:08

== Charts ==
=== Weekly charts ===
Chart (2017)	Peak position
Belgium (Ultratip Bubbling Under Wallonia)	4
New Zealand Heatseekers (RMNZ)	6
US Hot Dance/Electronic Songs (Billboard)	17

=== Year-end charts ===
Chart (2017)	Position
US Hot Dance/Electronic Songs (Billboard)	57

== Certifications ==
Region	Certification	Certified units/sales
Australia (ARIA)	Platinum	70,000^{‡}
New Zealand (RMNZ)	Platinum	30,000^{‡}
United States (RIAA)	Platinum	1,000,000^{‡}
^{‡} Sales+streaming figures based on certification alone.

== Release history ==
Date	Format	Label	Ref.
March 3, 2017	Digital download	Interscope	
