= Words (Daya song) =

Single by Daya

from the album Sit Still, Look Pretty
- Released: November 15, 2016
- Recorded: 2016
- Genre: Synthpop; tropical house
- Length: 3:32
- Label: Artbeatz; RED; Sony
- Songwriters: Gino Barletta; Melanie Fontana; Jonas Jeberg
- Producer: Jonas Jeberg

Daya singles chronology
"Don't Let Me Down" (2016)	"Words" (2016)	"Feel Good" (2017)

"Words" is a song by American singer Daya. The song was released on November 15, 2016, as the third single and only non-EP single from her debut studio album, Sit Still, Look Pretty (2016). It was written by Gino Barletta, Melanie Fontana, and Jonas Jeberg, with the production being handled by Barletta.

== Release ==
The song was released along with Sit Still, Look Pretty on October 7, 2016. Before being announced as the third single, it was receiving airplay on the Top 40 radio format. The song was performed at the Macy's Thanksgiving Parade on November 24, 2016.

== Critical reception ==
Neil Z. Yeung of AllMusic said "Honing in on contemporary production trends, "Words" sounds like a tropical-influenced relative of something from Justin Bieber's Purpose or Sia's 'Cheap Thrills'." Buzznet's Tina Roumeliotis stated "'Words' leaves a haunting Banks meets Bieber (believe it or not) feel in the air, making us curious as to what the next album may entail, despite it being way too soon to tell."

== Live performances ==
Daya performed "Words" at the 2016 Macy's Thanksgiving Day Parade.

== Charts ==
Chart (2016–17)	Peak position
Belgium (Ultratip Bubbling Under Flanders)	73
Canada CHR/Top 40 (Billboard)	43
US Pop Airplay (Billboard)	31

== Release history ==
Region	Date	Format	Label	Ref.
Worldwide	October 7, 2016	Digital download	Artbeatz; RED; Sony	
United States	November 15, 2016	Top 40 radio	Artbeatz; RED	
