= Daya (EP) =

EP by Daya
- Released: September 4, 2015
- Recorded: 2015
- Genre: Electropop; synthpop; teen pop
- Length: 20:42
- Label: Artbeatz; Z; RED
- Producer: Scott Bruzenak; Gino Barletta; Jamie P. Velez; Gino Barletta (exec.); Steven Zap (exec.)

Daya chronology
Daya (2015)	Sit Still, Look Pretty (2016)

Singles from Daya
- 1. "Hide Away" Released: April 22, 2015; 2. "Sit Still, Look Pretty" Released: September 4, 2015

Daya is the debut extended play (EP) by American singer Daya. It was released on September 4, 2015, through Artbeatz, Z Entertainment, and RED Distribution. The EP was made available to stream one day before its release on Billboard. A physical version of the EP was released exclusively to Target on October 30, 2015. All of the songs featured on the EP appeared on Daya's debut studio album, Sit Still, Look Pretty (2016).

== Background ==
In an interview with Billboard's Jason Lipshutz, Daya said about the EP "Each song on this EP has a piece of my heart, and I really hope that my fans can find pieces of themselves in it, too."

== Critical reception ==
Matt Collar of AllMusic stated "The debut EP from Grace Tandon a.k.a. Daya showcases the Pittsburgh native's bright, soulful vocals and electronic-tinged sound. Though only 16 years old at the time of the EP's release, Daya commands the mike with a highly resonant vocal style that fits nicely next to more established R&B artists like Beyoncé, as well as similarly inclined contemporaries like Lorde. Working with producer and songwriter Gino Barletta, Daya delivers a handful of empowering, passionate anthems that also work well on the dancefloor." Billboard's Jason Lipshutz said "[Daya] displays the young artist's musicianship and knack for straightforward, emotionally revealing lyrics."

== Singles ==
"Hide Away" was released as the lead single from the EP on April 22, 2015. Since its release, it has peaked at number 23 on the Billboard Hot 100, and has been certified Platinum by the RIAA.

"Sit Still, Look Pretty" was released to Top 40 radio as the second single from the EP on March 29, 2016. It has since peaked at number 28 on the Hot 100, and has been certified Gold by the RIAA.

== Track listing ==
No.	Title	Lyrics	Music	Producer(s)	Length
1.	"Thirsty"	Brett McLaughlin; Britten Newbill	Gino Barletta; Scott Bruzenak	Scott Bruzenak; Barletta^{[a]}	3:23
2.	"Legendary"	McLaughlin; Newbill; Kara Rantovich	Barletta; Bruzenak	Bruzenak; Barletta^{[a]}	3:24
3.	"U12"	McLaughlin; Newbill	Barletta; Bruzenak	Bruzenak; Barletta^{[a]}	3:23
4.	"Sit Still, Look Pretty"	Newbill; Mike Campbell	Barletta; Bruzenak	Bruzenak; Barletta^{[a]}	3:20
5.	"Hide Away"	Grace Tandon; McLaughlin; Newbill	Barletta; Bruzenak	Bruzenak; Barletta^{[a]}	3:12
6.	"Back to Me"	Tandon; John Lock; Newbill	Barletta; McLaughlin	Barletta; Jamie P. Velez; Barletta^{[a]}	4:00
Total length:					20:42

Notes

- ^{^[a]} signifies a vocal producer.
- "U12" is a stylization of "You Want To".

== Charts ==
=== Weekly charts ===
Chart (2015–16)	Peak position
Canadian Albums (Billboard)	99
Danish Albums (Hitlisten)	36
Swedish Albums (Sverigetopplistan)	33
US Billboard 200	61
US Heatseekers Albums (Billboard)	14

=== Year-end charts ===
Chart (2016)	Position
US Billboard 200	119

== Release history ==
Region	Date	Format	Label	Ref.
United States	September 3, 2015	Streaming	Artbeatz; Z; RED	
United States	September 4, 2015	Digital download	Artbeatz; Z; RED	
United States	October 30, 2015	CD	Artbeatz; Z; RED	
