= Wanted (NOTD and Daya song) =

Single by NOTD and Daya
- Released: 27 September 2019
- Length: 2:40
- Label: Polydor; Universal Music Sweden
- Songwriter(s): Samuel Brandt; Tobias Danielsson; Samuel Denison Martin; Isaiah Tejada; Delacey; Grace Tandon
- Producer(s): NOTD

NOTD singles chronology
"Keep You Mine" (2019)	"Wanted" (2019)	"I Don't Know Why" (2020)

Daya singles chronology
"Keeping It in the Dark" (2019)	"Wanted" (2019)	"Older" (2020)

Music video
- "Wanted" on YouTube

"Wanted" is a song by Swedish production duo NOTD and American singer Daya, it was released on 27 September 2019, via Polydor Records and Universal Music Sweden.

== Background ==
When accepted an interview, Daya expressed she wrote the song with Delacey and Sam Martin by piano two years ago: "NOTD took it from there and entirely transformed it. They took all the outdated parts of it and gave them new life."

== Composition ==
The song is written in the key of F major, with a tempo of 96 beats per minute.

== Track listing ==
Digital download
No.	Title	Length
1.	"Wanted"	2:40

Digital download – Kuur remix
No.	Title	Length
1.	"Wanted (Kuur remix)"	4:00

Digital download – Laxcity remix
No.	Title	Length
1.	"Wanted (Laxcity remix)"	2:30

Digital download – RetroVision remix
No.	Title	Length
1.	"Wanted (RetroVision remix)"	2:57

== Credits and personnel ==
Credits adapted from AllMusic.

- Samuel Brandt – composer, primary artist
- Tobias Danielsson – composer, primary artist
- Daya – primary artist, composer
- Delacey – composer
- Samuel Denison Martin – composer
- Isaiah Tejada – composer

== Charts ==
=== Weekly charts ===
Weekly chart performance for "Wanted"
Chart (2019)	Peak position
New Zealand Hot Singles (RMNZ)	40
US Dance Club Songs (Billboard)	17
US Hot Dance/Electronic Songs (Billboard)	24

=== Year-end charts ===
Year-end chart performance for "Wanted"
Chart (2020)	Position
US Hot Dance/Electronic Songs (Billboard)	96
