= Don't Let Me Down (The Chainsmokers song) =

2016 single by The Chainsmokers featuring Daya

Single by The Chainsmokers featuring Daya

from the EP Collage
- Released: February 5, 2016
- Genre: EDM trap; indie pop; big room house
- Length: 3:28
- Label: Disruptor; Columbia; Sony
- Songwriters: Andrew Taggart; Emily Warren; Scott Harris
- Producer: The Chainsmokers

The Chainsmokers singles chronology
"New York City" (2015)	"Don't Let Me Down" (2016)	"Inside Out" (2016)

Daya singles chronology
"Sit Still, Look Pretty" (2015)	"Don't Let Me Down" (2016)	"Words" (2016)

Music video
- "Don't Let Me Down" on YouTube

"Don't Let Me Down" is a song by the American production duo the Chainsmokers featuring vocals by American singer Daya. It was released on February 5, 2016, through Disruptor Records and Columbia Records. The song was written by Andrew Taggart, Emily Warren, and Scott Harris. It was released as the radio single follow-up to "Roses".

"Don't Let Me Down" became both the Chainsmokers' and Daya's first (and to date, Daya's only) top-five single on the US Billboard Hot 100, peaking at number 3. It also became the Chainsmokers' second consecutive Top 10 entry after "Roses", which peaked at number 6. It reached the Top 10 in several countries, including Australia, Austria, Canada, Germany, New Zealand, Sweden, and the United Kingdom. A set of remixes for the song, was released on April 15, 2016. A music video for the song was released on April 29, 2016, with appearances from the Chainsmokers and Daya.

The song won a Grammy Award for Best Dance Recording.

In 2026, the song received a Diamond certification by the RIAA for selling 12 million units in the United States.

== Background and composition ==
In an interview, Taggart stated that he first created the drop during a flight. The duo later added a "big, echoey guitar sound" to the song, inspired by the bands the xx and Explosions in the Sky, by using a Fender electric guitar and a software plugin. Emily Warren and Scott Harris convened with the duo to create the melody and lyrics. However, the vocalist was not chosen until Taggart heard Daya's "Hide Away", after which the duo enlisted her to record the vocals in the studio. The song was originally intended for Rihanna, but her team rejected it.

The key of the song was originally a step lower, but the duo changed it in order to better accommodate Daya's range. The third drop, which includes the saxophone, was created later in the process. The song has a double-time tempo of 80 beats per minute and a key of G♯ minor. "Don't Let Me Down" follows a chord progression of E – B – F♯ – G♯m, and Daya's vocals span from G♯_{3} to C♯_{5}.

== Critical reception ==
“Don’t Let Me Down” received critical acclaim. Robbie Daw of Idolator stated "[Don't Let Me Down] kicks off with a haunting guitar loop and 17-year-old Daya lamenting that she's 'crashing, hit a wall, right now I need a miracle.' By the time the chorus sweeps in, the song shifts into full-on trap mode" and called it a "trappy collaboration". Popdust's Jason Scott claimed "[Don't Let Me Down] is an enormously engaging strip of gritty dance-club euphoria. Percussion vibrates underneath a well-constructed skyscraper of synth and evocative vocals from the 17-year-old Daya." Rolling Stone named "Don't Let Me Down" one of the 30 best songs of the first half of 2016, writing "EDM may not dominate the charts the way it used to but the Chainsmokers' swirling, turnt-up love song proves the genre has a little fight left in it. Newcomer Daya goes to battle with the aggro, big room beats and ends up coming out on top."

== Chart performance ==
In the United States, “Don’t Let Me Down” debuted at number 85 on the US Billboard Hot 100 for the week of February 27, 2016 but fell off the chart the next week. It made a re-entry at number 81 for the week of March 12, 2016, where it would slowly but steadily climb the charts. On the chart dating May 21, 2016, "Don't Let Me Down" finally entered the top ten at number seven, entered the top five for the week of June 11, 2016, and eventually reached its peak of number three for the week of July 16, 2016 (where it spent two consecutive weeks at). On the chart dating February 25, 2017, "Don't Let Me Down" entered its 52nd (and to date final) week on the charts. The single spent 23 consecutive weeks the top ten, with 12 non-consecutive weeks spent in the top five. It was ultimately the eighth best-performing single of 2016 by Billboard (two spots above the duo's number-one hit "Closer").

In the United Kingdom, "Don't Let Me Down" became the Chainsmokers' highest-charting hit (until "Closer" which reached the top of the chart in September 2016) when the song reached number two on the UK Singles Chart on the issue dated July 21, 2016, spending 11 weeks in the top 10.

== Music video ==
The music video for the song was released to YouTube on April 29, 2016.

In the video, Andrew Taggart and Alex Pall (the Chainsmokers) get into a yellow convertible, lowrider at sunrise and begin to drive down a wooded mountain road. Intercut with shots of them driving is Daya, dressed in black leather pants and jacket, singing in a misty field full of bushes. Taggart and Pall stop the car when Daya, surrounded by dancers dressed similarly to her, stand in the middle of the road, blocking it. Daya sings as the girls perform dance moves around her while Taggart and Pall watch from the car. Suddenly, the cars hydraulic suspension begins bouncing up and down on its wheels. As the beat progresses, the rocking of the car becomes more violent and aggressive. Towards the end of the song, the rocking lifts Taggart and Pall out of the car and they are suspended in the air as the girls disperse.

As of November 2026, the video has received over 2.3 billion views on YouTube.

== Cover versions ==
Usher covered "Don't Let Me Down" in BBC Radio 1's Live Lounge on September 5, 2016.

Denver, CO heavy metal band, Immortal Sÿnn, released a cover of the song on November 3, 2016.

== In other media ==
In March 2017, the Joy Williams version of the song was used in a State Farm Insurance commercial.

== Track listing ==
Digital download
No.	Title	Length
1.	"Don't Let Me Down" (featuring Daya)	3:28

Digital download – remixes EP
No.	Title	Length
1.	"Don't Let Me Down" (featuring Daya) (W&W remix)	3:15
2.	"Don't Let Me Down" (featuring Daya) (Illenium remix)	3:40
3.	"Don't Let Me Down" (featuring Daya) (Zomboy remix)	4:26
4.	"Don't Let Me Down" (featuring Daya) (Ephwurd remix)	4:05
5.	"Don't Let Me Down" (featuring Daya) (Ricky Remedy remix)	4:39
6.	"Don't Let Me Down" (featuring Daya and Konshens) (Dom Da Bomb x Electric Bodega Mixshow remix)	3:25
Total length:		23:30

Digital download – Hardwell and Sephyx remix
No.	Title	Length
1.	"Don't Let Me Down" (featuring Daya) (Hardwell and Sephyx remix)	2:42

== Charts ==
=== Weekly charts ===
Chart (2016–2017)	Peak position
Australia (ARIA)	3
Austria (Ö3 Austria Top 40)	6
Belgium (Ultratop 50 Flanders)	4
Belgium (Ultratop 50 Wallonia)	15
Canada Hot 100 (Billboard)	4
Czech Republic Airplay (ČNS IFPI)	17
Czech Republic Singles Digital (ČNS IFPI)	4
Denmark (Tracklisten)	15
Finland (Suomen virallinen lista)	9
France (SNEP)	19
Germany (GfK)	6
Hong Kong (HKRIA)	23
Hungary (Dance Top 40)	33
Hungary (Single Top 40)	9
Hungary (Stream Top 40)	3
India (Radio Mirchi Angrezi Top 20)	3
Ireland (IRMA)	3
Italy (FIMI)	7
Japan Hot 100 (Billboard)	63
Latvia (Latvijas Top 40)	3
Lebanon (Lebanese Top 20)	8
Mexico (Monitor Latino)	12
Netherlands (Dutch Top 40)	7
Netherlands (Single Top 100)	5
New Zealand (Recorded Music NZ)	2
Norway (VG-lista)	5
Philippines (Philippine Hot 100)	35
Portugal (AFP)	4
Romania (Media Forest)	6
Scottish Singles Sales (Official Charts)	3
Slovakia Airplay (ČNS IFPI)	48
Slovakia Singles Digital (ČNS IFPI)	3
Slovenia (SloTop50)	28
Spain (Promusicae)	8
Sweden (Sverigetopplistan)	5
Switzerland (Schweizer Hitparade)	8
UK Dance (Official Charts)	1
UK Singles (Official Charts)	2
US Billboard Hot 100	3
US Adult Pop Airplay (Billboard)	6
US Dance Airplay (Billboard)	1
US Dance Club Songs (Billboard)	4
US Hot Dance/Electronic Songs (Billboard)	1
US Pop Airplay (Billboard)	1
US Rhythmic Airplay (Billboard)	3

=== Year-end charts ===
Chart (2016)	Position
Australia (ARIA)	5
Austria (Ö3 Austria Top 40)	7
Belgium (Ultratop Flanders)	7
Belgium (Ultratop Wallonia)	38
Canada (Canadian Hot 100)	8
Denmark (Tracklisten)	25
France (SNEP)	31
Germany (Official German Charts)	7
Hungary (Single Top 40)	47
Iceland (Plötutíóindi)	41
Italy (FIMI)	12
Netherlands (Dutch Top 40)	18
Netherlands (Single Top 100)	8
New Zealand (Recorded Music NZ)	5
Spain (PROMUSICAE)	17
Sweden (Sverigetopplistan)	6
Switzerland (Schweizer Hitparade)	14
UK Singles (Official Charts Company)	17
US Billboard Hot 100	8
US Adult Top 40 (Billboard)	23
US Hot Dance/Electronic Songs (Billboard)	1
US Mainstream Top 40 (Billboard)	3
US Rhythmic (Billboard)	6
Worldwide (IFPI)	8

Chart (2017)	Position
Brazil (Pro-Música Brasil)	110
US Hot Dance/Electronic Songs (Billboard)	13
US Streaming Songs (Billboard)	64

=== Decade-end charts ===
Chart (2010–2019)	Position
Australia (ARIA)	97
Germany (Official German Charts)	23
UK Singles (Official Charts Company)	92
US Billboard Hot 100	58
US Hot Dance/Electronic Songs (Billboard)	7

== Certifications ==
Region	Certification	Certified units/sales
Australia (ARIA)	9× Platinum	630,000^{‡}
Austria (IFPI Austria)	Platinum	30,000^{‡}
Belgium (BRMA)	3× Platinum	60,000^{‡}
Brazil (Pro-Música Brasil)	3× Diamond	750,000^{‡}
Canada (Music Canada)	9× Platinum	720,000^{‡}
Denmark (IFPI Danmark)	3× Platinum	270,000^{‡}
France (SNEP)	Diamond	233,333^{‡}
Germany (BVMI)	Diamond	1,000,000^{‡}
Italy (FIMI)	6× Platinum	300,000^{‡}
Mexico (AMPROFON)	Diamond	300,000^{‡}
Netherlands (NVPI)	3× Platinum	90,000^{‡}
New Zealand (RMNZ)	7× Platinum	210,000^{‡}
Poland (ZPAV)	4× Platinum	200,000^{‡}
Portugal (AFP)	2× Platinum	20,000^{‡}
Spain (Promusicae)	3× Platinum	120,000^{‡}
Sweden (GLF)	6× Platinum	240,000^{‡}
United Kingdom (BPI)	4× Platinum	2,400,000^{‡}
United States (RIAA)	12× Platinum	12,000,000^{‡}
^{‡} Sales+streaming figures based on certification alone.

== Release history ==
Region	Date	Format	Label	Ref.
Various	February 5, 2016	Digital download	Disruptor; Columbia	
United States	March 22, 2016	Top 40 radio	Disruptor; Columbia	
United States	April 15, 2016	Digital download (Remixes EP)	Disruptor; Columbia	
