= Hide Away (Daya song) =

Single by Daya

from the album Daya and Sit Still, Look Pretty
- Released: April 22, 2015
- Recorded: 2015
- Genre: Synthpop
- Length: 3:12
- Label: Artbeatz; Z; RED
- Songwriters: Gino Barletta; Brett McLaughlin; Britten Newbill; Scott Bruzenak; Grace Tandon
- Producer: Scott Bruzenak

Daya singles chronology
"Hide Away" (2015)	"Sit Still, Look Pretty" (2015)

Music video
- "Hide Away" on YouTube

"Hide Away" is the debut single by American singer Daya, and was released on April 22, 2015. It is also the lead single from her debut self-titled extended play (EP), Daya (2015) and her debut studio album Sit Still, Look Pretty (2016). The song peaked at number 23 on the Billboard Hot 100, becoming Daya's first top 40 single in the U.S. The single also reached the top ten in Australia and the top forty in Belgium, Canada, New Zealand, Norway, and Slovakia.

The song has since been certified platinum by the Recording Industry Association of America (RIAA). A music video for the song was released on October 28, 2015. Daya performed a mashup of the song live at the 2016 Radio Disney Music Awards with Kelsea Ballerini.

== Background ==
"Hide Away" was released through Artbeatz, Z Entertainment, and RED Distribution on April 22, 2015. It was written by Gino Barletta, Brett McLaughlin, Britten Newbill, Grace Tandon and Scott Bruzenak. it was also produced by Bruzenak.

== Composition ==
Musically, "Hide Away" is composed in the key of D major, with a tempo of 95 beats per minute. It is set in common time.

== Critical reception ==
Billboard's Jason Lipshutz featured the single on his list "Pop Playlist Summer 2015: 15 Awesome Songs You Might Have Missed", labelling it "a gorgeous debut".

== Chart performance ==
"Hide Away" made its first chart appearance on the week ending September 12, 2015, debuting at number 10 on the Pop Digital Songs chart. The next week, it entered the Bubbling Under Hot 100 Singles chart. It stayed there for two weeks, peaking at number 3 on the second week of the chart. On the week ending October 3, 2015, the song debuted on the Billboard Hot 100 at number 97, peaking at number 23 on March 12, 2016.

Shortly after the song went viral on the app TikTok in April 2024, 9 years after the songs initial release, the song re-entered the Ireland charts at a new peak of #32; and also entered the Global 200 chart at #198.

== Music video ==
A music video for the song was released on October 28, 2015. The video features a bunch of overprotective fathers who banded together to kidnap a boy who Daya goes on dates with. Daya is confused to why her date disappears one day at the bowling alley, until she comes home from a pool party arranged by her friends to get her mind off her date, she sees her date run out of her house followed by Daya's father running behind him. Daya scolds her father for kidnapping him.

== Live performance ==
On May 1, 2016, Daya performed the song at the 2016 Radio Disney Music Awards with Kelsea Ballerini as a mashup with her song "Peter Pan".

== Charts ==
=== Weekly charts ===
2015–2016 weekly chart performance for "Hide Away"
Chart (2015–2016)	Peak position
Australia (ARIA)	6
Austria (Ö3 Austria Top 40)	45
Belgium (Ultratop 50 Flanders)	35
Belgium (Ultratip Bubbling Under Wallonia)	15
Canada Hot 100 (Billboard)	18
Germany (GfK)	44
Hungary (Stream Top 40)	32
Ireland (IRMA)	57
Italy (FIMI)	95
Netherlands (Single Top 100)	48
New Zealand (Recorded Music NZ)	15
Norway (VG-lista)	29
Slovakia Singles Digital (ČNS IFPI)	25
Sweden (Sverigetopplistan)	55
Switzerland (Schweizer Hitparade)	55
UK Indie (Official Charts)	6
US Billboard Hot 100	23
US Adult Pop Airplay (Billboard)	16
US Dance Airplay (Billboard)	20
US Pop Airplay (Billboard)	7

2024 weekly chart performance for "Hide Away"
Chart (2024)	Peak position
Global 200 (Billboard)	151
Ireland (IRMA)	27

=== Year-end charts ===
Year-end chart performance for "Hide Away"
Chart (2016)	Position
Australia (ARIA)	55
Canada (Canadian Hot 100)	69
US Billboard Hot 100	84
US Mainstream Top 40 (Billboard)	36

== Certifications ==
Certifications for "Hide Away"
Region	Certification	Certified units/sales
Australia (ARIA)	Platinum	70,000^{‡}
Canada (Music Canada)	Platinum	80,000^{*}
Denmark (IFPI Danmark)	Gold	45,000^{‡}
Germany (BVMI)	Gold	300,000^{‡}
Italy (FIMI)	Gold	25,000^{‡}
New Zealand (RMNZ)	3× Platinum	90,000^{‡}
Sweden (GLF)	Platinum	40,000^{‡}
United Kingdom (BPI)	Gold	400,000^{‡}
United States (RIAA)	2× Platinum	2,000,000^{‡}
^{*} Sales figures based on certification alone.^{‡} Sales+streaming figures based on certification alone.
