= Daya (singer) =

American singer and songwriter (born 1998)

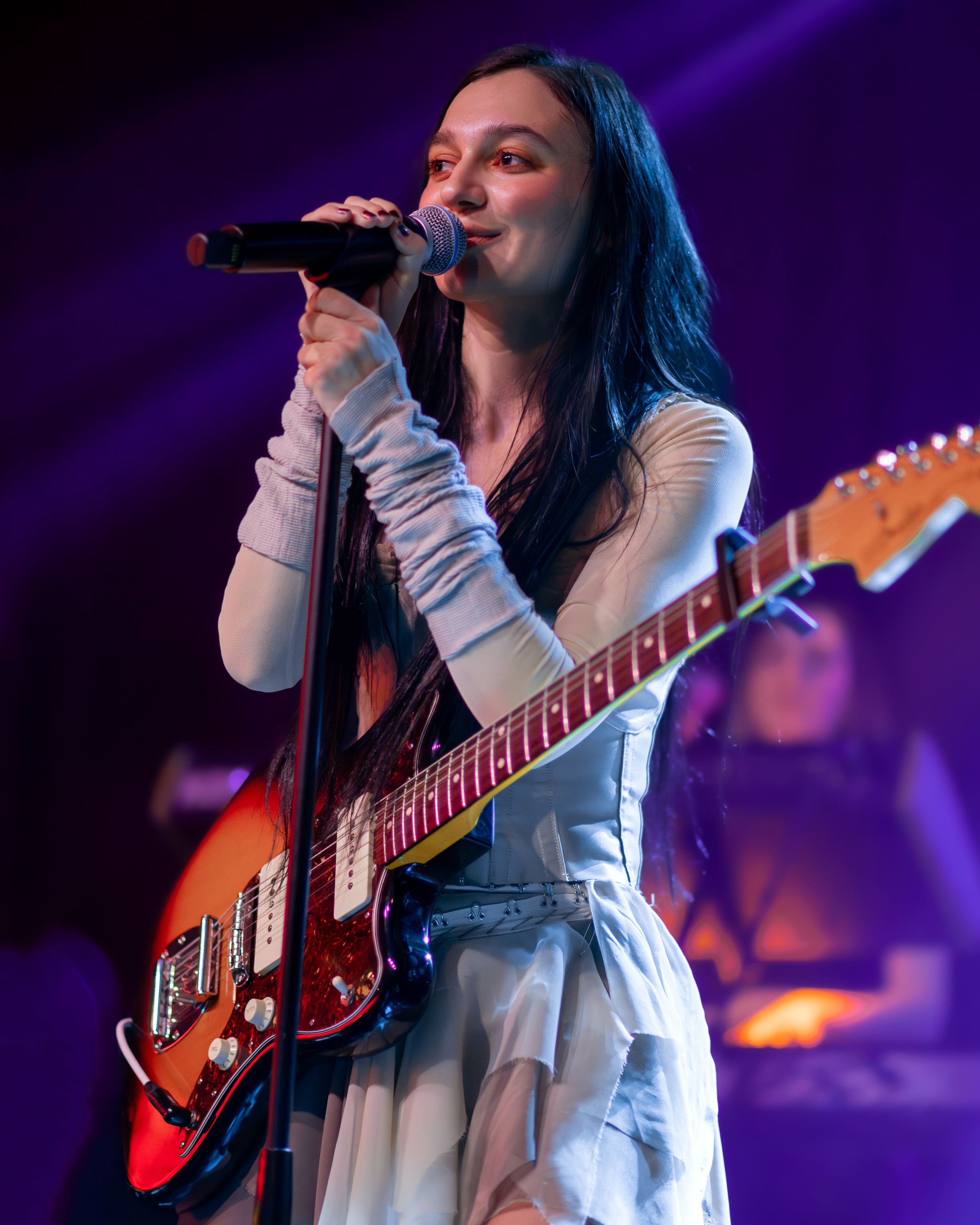
- Daya in 2024

Background information
- Born: Grace Martine Tandon; October 24, 1998 (age 27); Pittsburgh, Pennsylvania, US
- Origin: Mt. Lebanon, Pennsylvania, US
- Genres: Pop; synthpop; electronic
- Occupations: Singer; songwriter
- Instruments: Vocals; guitar
- Works: Discography
- Years active: 2015–present
- Labels: Artbeatz; Z; RED; Interscope; Sandlot; AWAL; ONErpm
- Website: dayaofficial.com

Grace Martine Tandon (born October 24, 1998), known professionally as Daya (stylized DΛYΛ; pronounced /ˈdeɪ.ə/), is an American singer and songwriter from the Pittsburgh suburb of Mt. Lebanon, Pennsylvania. She released her self-titled debut extended play (EP), Daya, on September 4, 2015. The album includes the song "Hide Away," which peaked at number 23 on the Billboard Hot 100. She released her debut studio album Sit Still, Look Pretty on October 7, 2016. She is currently signed to ONErpm. The Chainsmokers' "Don't Let Me Down", for which she provided vocals, was a worldwide top-ten song and became one of the best-selling singles of all time.

== Early life ==
Grace Martine Tandon was born on October 24, 1998, in Pittsburgh, and grew up in the suburb of Mt. Lebanon, Pennsylvania. Her paternal grandfather was a Punjabi Indian immigrant from Delhi, India. She has four siblings, Lou, Mariana, Celia, and Avery. Her stage name Daya ([dɐˈjaː]) is the Sanskrit word for "compassion" or "kindness". She attended grade school at St. Bernard School and later graduated from Mt. Lebanon High School. At the age of three, Daya began to learn the piano, and started jazz piano at the age of 11. By this time, she had also learned to play the guitar, ukulele, saxophone, and flute. Daya also spent a summer studying songwriting at Interlochen Arts Camp.

At 11, Daya enrolled as a student at the Accelerando Music Conservatory, owned by Christina Chirumbolo, in Pittsburgh. There, she met songwriter and producer Gino Barletta, a colleague of Chirumbolo who visited the school as a lecturer. Chirumbolo and Barletta founded INSIDE ACCESS, a music camp where the two worked with Daya and eventually invited her to Los Angeles in February 2015 to work on original material.

== Music career ==
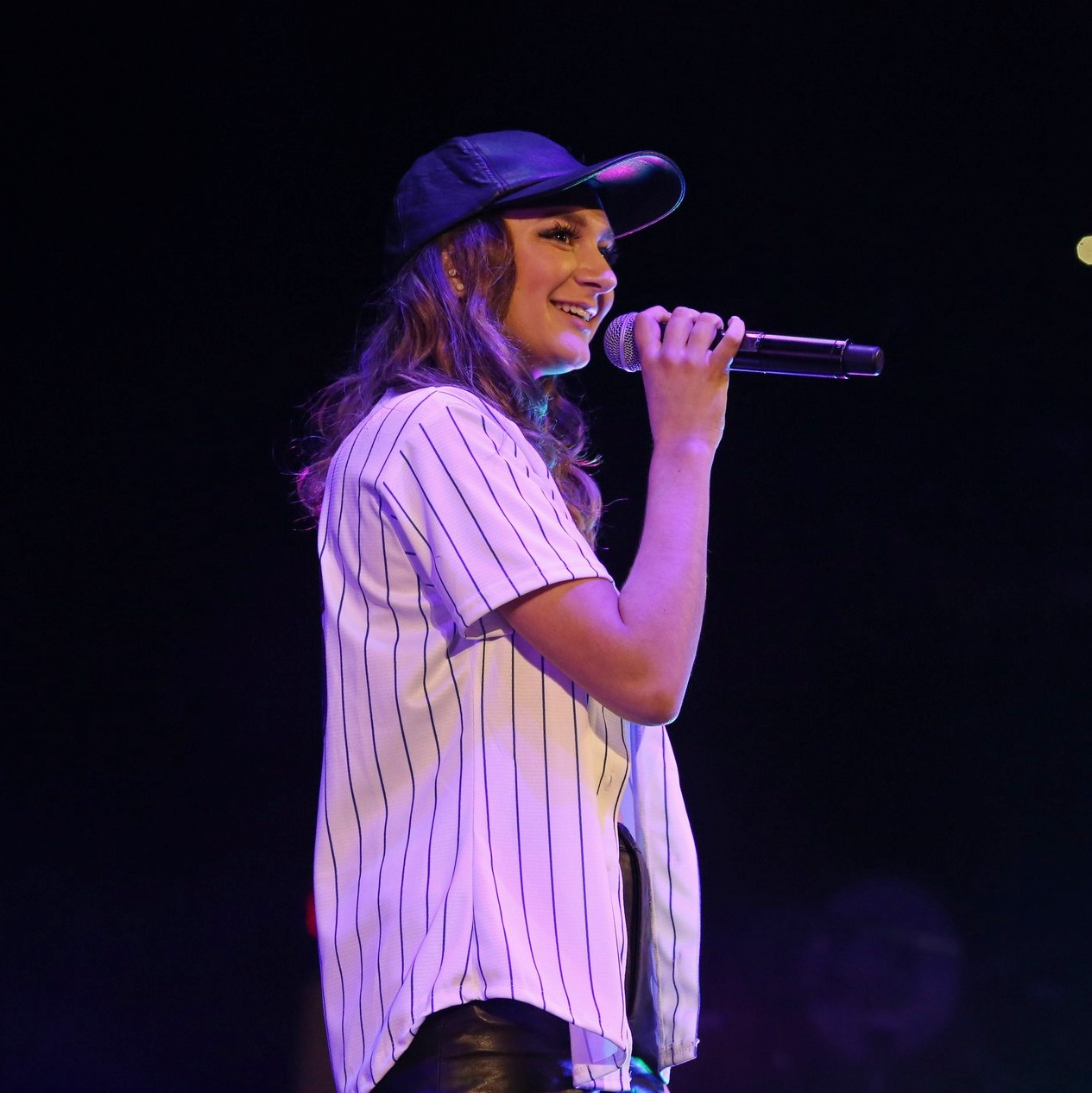
Daya performing in Chicago in June 2016

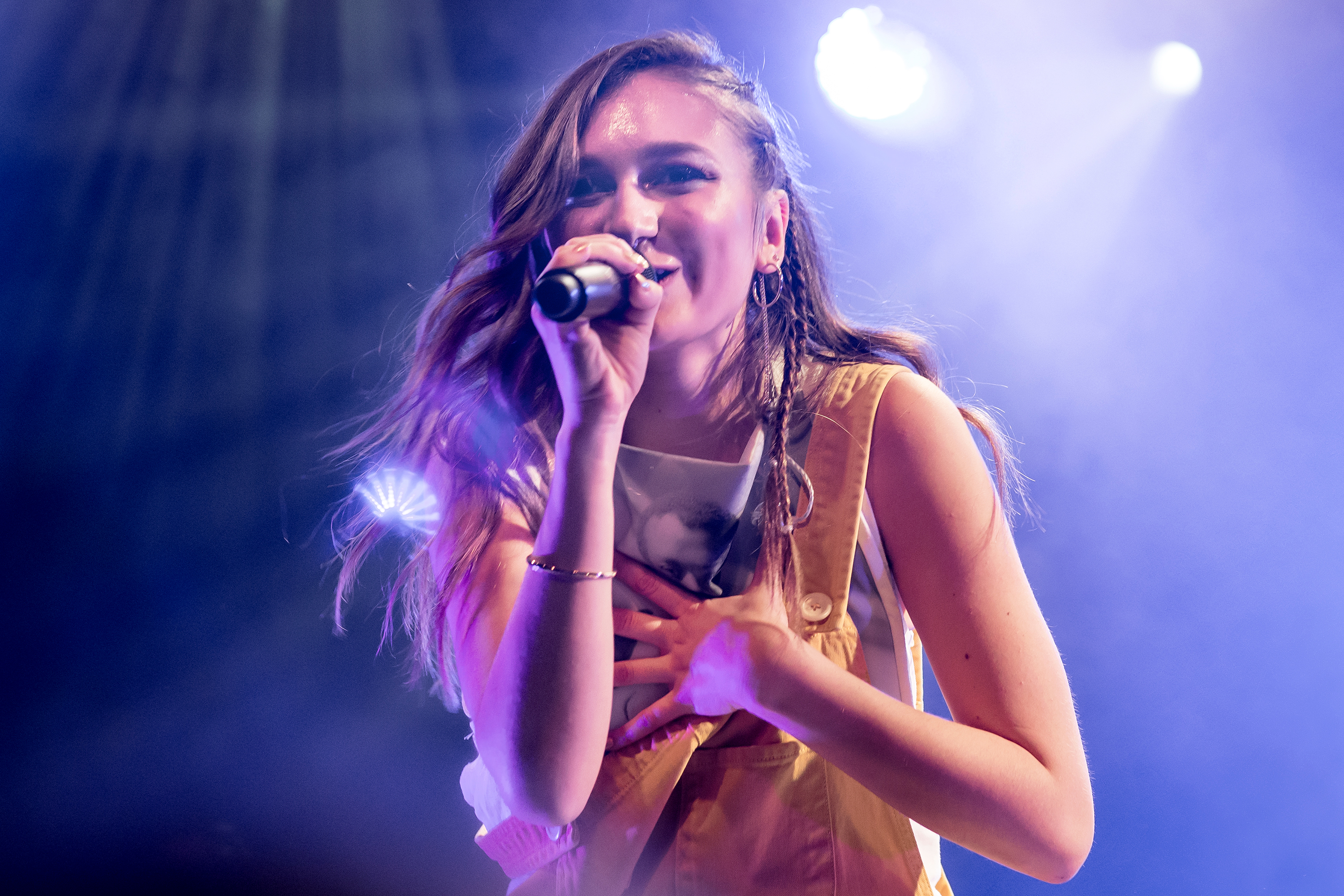
Daya performing in Los Angeles in March 2017

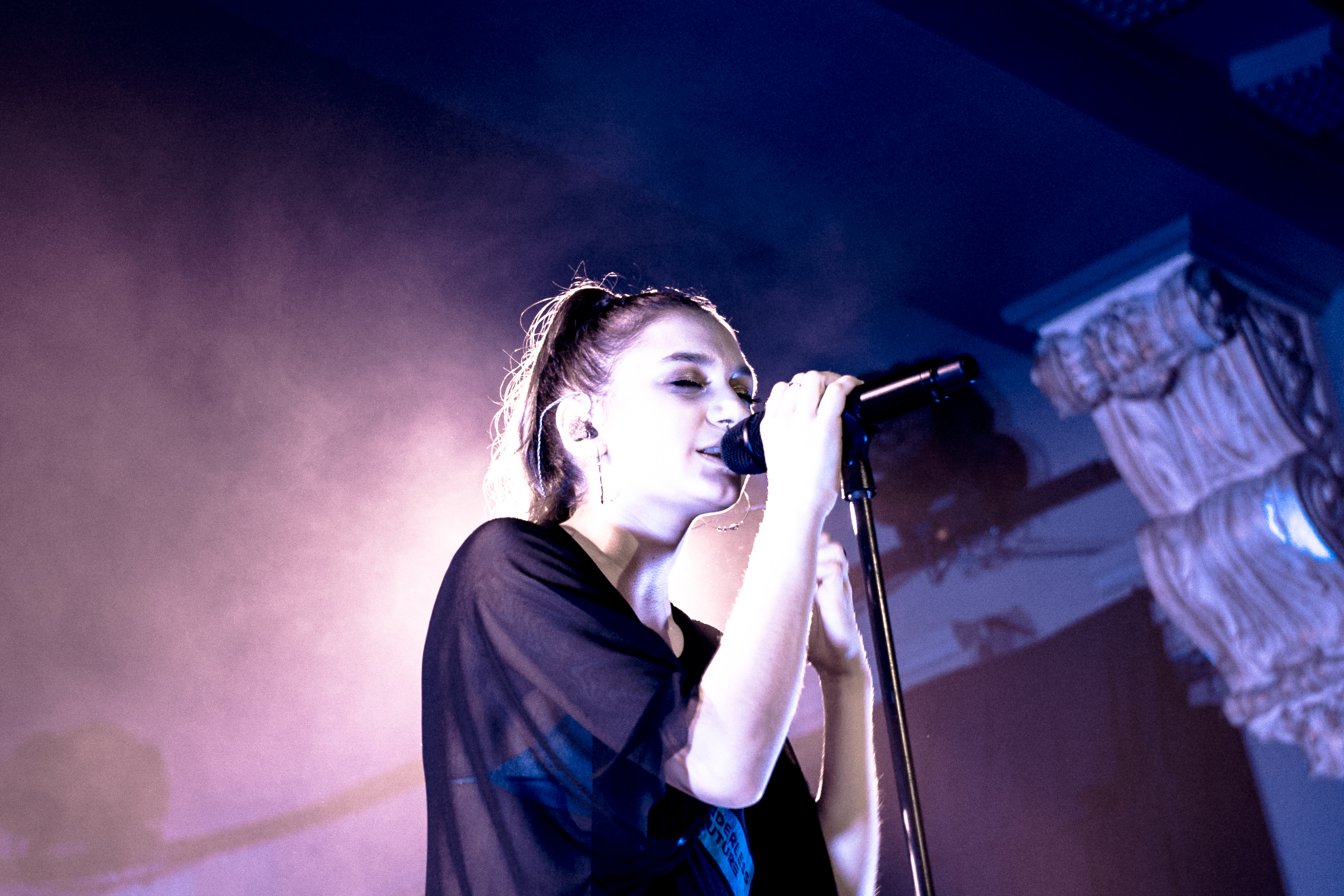
Daya performing in San Francisco in March 2017

Daya's professional career began when her parents accompanied her to Los Angeles to work with Christina Chirumbolo and Gino Barletta, founders of INSIDE ACCESS by Accelerando, Brett McLaughlin, Britten Newbill and Noisecastle III at Paramount Recording Studios. It was during one of these writing sessions that her debut single "Hide Away" was written and recorded, and Barletta consequently introduced Daya to Steve Zap of Z Entertainment. Daya, who was a junior in high school at the time, said she didn't think anything would happen for a while, and went back to school the next day. A radio promotions veteran, Zap liked the song and was interested in helping to promote the singer, leading to forming an independent label with Barletta called Artbeatz.

Daya released her song "Hide Away" on April 22, 2015. The song was well-received online, enjoyed support from a number of notable bloggers including Tyler Oakley and Perez Hilton, the latter commenting "There is something very special about Daya's voice". Jason Lipshutz of Billboard also featured the single on their official website, labeling it "a gorgeous debut".

Daya made her television debut performing "Hide Away" on Today with Kathie Lee and Hoda on August 21, 2015, as Elvis Duran's Artist of the Month. She returned to Today for their summer concert series on June 28, 2016.

Following a successful debut, Daya released her self-titled EP, Daya, which features six songs, including "Hide Away", on September 4, 2015. The EP was premiered in full a day early by Billboard, and debuted at number 161 on the Billboard 200, propelling "Hide Away" to number 40 on the Billboard Pop Songs chart.

On October 30, 2015, Daya released the physical version of her debut EP through Target.

In 2016, Daya was the opening act for American pop-rap duo Jack & Jack's US tour. In February 2016, she was featured on The Chainsmokers' song "Don't Let Me Down", which eventually peaked at number 3 on the Hot 100, becoming her second top 40 entry and her first top 10. This was the only song by Daya that reached the Billboard Hot 100 Decade-End Chart. She also released the second single from her self-titled EP, "Sit Still, Look Pretty", which debuted at number 100 and peaked at number 28, her third top 40.

Daya was invited to perform at the 2016 White House Easter Egg Roll, where she and her family met President Barack Obama and the First Lady Michelle Obama. On November 15, 2016, Daya released her song "Words" as her third single from her debut album Sit Still, Look Pretty.

On December 6, 2016, it was announced that "Don't Let Me Down" had been nominated for the 59th Annual Grammy Awards. On February 12, 2017, it won the Grammy Award for Best Dance Recording making it the singer's first Grammy Award.

In March 2017, she worked for Gryffin's song "Feel Good" along with Illenium. On October 11, 2017, she released a new single, "New", through Interscope Records.

In March 2018, Daya was featured on RL Grime's song "I Wanna Know" which was released on March 16, 2018.

On June 22, 2018, Daya released her single "Safe". On July 18, 2018, she released the video for the single.

Daya released five singles in 2019. Two of the singles, "Insomnia" and "Left Me Yet", were originally intended to be on her second studio album. "Forward Motion" was intended for the movie Late Night. "Keeping It in the Dark" is on the soundtrack of the Netflix series 13 Reasons Why. "Wanted" is a collaboration with Swedish music production duo NOTD.

On October 9, 2020, she released "First Time", which was rumored to be related to a new album. It ended up being on her EP The Difference, released on May 14, 2021, together with "Montana", which she released a little earlier, on April 30 and "Bad Girl", which already charted on the Mainstream Top 40. She released her next EP In Between Dreams on September 16, 2022. On September 8, 2024, Daya performed at Princeton University's biannual lawnparty, alongside NLE Choppa. On May 6, 2026, Daya performed at Cornell University's annual Slope Day alongside The Chainsmokers.

== Discography ==
Studio albums

- Sit Still, Look Pretty (2016)
- Til Every Petal Drops (2025)

== Personal life ==
Daya came out publicly as bisexual in October 2018 for National Coming Out Day. On April 2, 2021, Daya went public on Instagram with her girlfriend of three years, Clyde Munroe, after releasing a single about her titled "Bad Girl."

== Filmography ==
Television roles
Year	Title	Role	Note
2016	School of Rock	Herself	"I Put a Spell on You" (Season 2: episode 5)

== Awards and nominations ==
Year	Award	Category	Work	Result
2016	Radio Disney Music Awards	Best New Artist	Herself	Nominated
2016	MTV Video Music Awards	Best Electronic Video	"Don't Let Me Down"	Nominated
2016	Latin American Music Awards	Favorite Dance Song	"Don't Let Me Down"	Nominated
2016	American Music Awards	Collaboration of the Year	"Don't Let Me Down"	Nominated
2017	Grammy Awards	Best Dance Recording	"Don't Let Me Down"	Won
2017	iHeartRadio Music Awards	Dance Song of the Year	"Don't Let Me Down"	Nominated
2017	iHeartRadio Music Awards	Best Collaboration	"Don't Let Me Down"	Nominated
2017	iHeartRadio Music Awards	Best Music Video	"Don't Let Me Down"	Nominated
2017	iHeartRadio Music Awards	Best New Pop Artist	Herself	Nominated
2017	Kids' Choice Awards	Favorite New Artist	Herself	Nominated
2017	WDM Radio Awards	Best Electronic Vocalist	Herself	Nominated
2017	WDM Radio Awards	Best Trending Track	"Don't Let Me Down"	Won
2017	Radio Disney Music Awards	Best Dance Track (Best Song to Dance To)	"Don't Let Me Down"	Nominated
2017	Radio Disney Music Awards	Song of the Year	"Sit Still, Look Pretty"	Nominated
2017	Radio Disney Music Awards	Breakout Artist of the Year	Herself	Nominated
2017	Billboard Music Awards	Top Hot 100 Song	"Don't Let Me Down"	Nominated
2017	Billboard Music Awards	Top Selling Song	"Don't Let Me Down"	Nominated
2017	Billboard Music Awards	Top Radio Song	"Don't Let Me Down"	Nominated
2017	Billboard Music Awards	Top Collaboration	"Don't Let Me Down"	Nominated
2017	Billboard Music Awards	Top Dance/Electronic Song	"Don't Let Me Down"	Nominated
2020	Spotify Awards	Most-Streamed EDM Female Artist	Herself	Nominated
2025	Electronic Dance Music Awards	Female Artist Of The Year	Herself	Pending
2025	Electronic Dance Music Awards	Dance / Electro Pop Song of the Year	"Don't Call"	Pending
