= List of The Mortal Instruments characters =

This is a list of the main characters from The Mortal Instruments series by Cassandra Clare, including the novels City of Bones, City of Ashes, City of Glass, City of Fallen Angels, City of Lost Souls, and City of Heavenly Fire. The series is part of a bigger media franchise, The Shadowhunter Chronicles. The series was adapted into a film, The Mortal Instruments: City of Bones, and a television series, Shadowhunters.

== Television series cast ==
The following is a list of Shadowhunters television series regulars who have appeared in one or more of the series' three seasons. The characters are listed in the order they were first credited in the series.

Key
= Main cast (actor receives "Starring" credit that season)
= Recurring cast (actor appears in two or more episodes that season)
= Guest cast (actor appears in only one episode that season)

Character	Actor	Seasons		
Character	Actor	1	2	3
Clary Fray	Katherine McNamara	Main	Main	Main
Jace Herondale	Dominic Sherwood	Main	Main	Main
Simon Lewis	Alberto Rosende	Main	Main	Main
Alec Lightwood	Matthew Daddario	Main	Main	Main
Izzy Lightwood	Emeraude Toubia	Main	Main	Main
Luke Garroway	Isaiah Mustafa	Main	Main	Main
Magnus Bane	Harry Shum Jr.	Main	Main	Main
Maia Roberts	Alisha Wainwright		Recurring	Main
Recurring cast
Raphael Santiago	David Castro	Recurring	Recurring	Recurring
Meliorn	Jade Hassouné	Recurring	Recurring	Recurring
Valentine Morgenstern	Alan van Sprang	Recurring	Recurring	Guest
Jocelyn Fray	Maxim Roy	Recurring	Recurring	Guest
Alaric Rodriguez	Joel Labelle	Recurring	Recurring	
Dorothea "Dot" Rollins	Vanessa Matsui	Recurring	Recurring	
Hodge Starkweather	Jon Cor	Recurring	Guest	
Camille Belcourt	Kaitlyn Leeb	Recurring	Guest	
Maureen	Shailene Garnett	Recurring		
Captain Susanna Vargas	Lisa Marcos	Recurring		
Elaine Lewis	Christina Cox	Recurring	Recurring	Recurring
Maryse Lightwood	Nicola Correia-Damude	Recurring	Recurring	Recurring
Robert Lightwood	Paulino Nunes	Recurring	Recurring	Guest
Max Lightwood	Jack Fulton	Recurring	Recurring	Guest
Rebecca Lewis	Holly Deveaux	Guest	Recurring	Recurring
Lydia Branwell	Stephanie Bennett	Recurring	Recurring	
Raj	Raymond Ablack	Recurring	Recurring	Guest
Imogen Herondale	Mimi Kuzyk	Guest	Recurring	Recurring
Victor Aldertree	Nick Sagar		Recurring	Guest
Gretel Monroe	Joanne Jansen		Recurring	
Consul Malachi Dieudonné	Andreas Apergis		Recurring	
Jonathan Morgenstern	Will Tudor		Recurring	Recurring
Jonathan Morgenstern	Elias Toufexis		Recurring	
Jonathan Morgenstern	Luke Baines			Recurring
Olivia "Ollie" Wilson	Alexandra Ordolis		Recurring	Recurring
Iris Rouse	Stephanie Belding		Recurring	Recurring
Seelie Queen	Lola Flanery		Recurring	Recurring
Seelie Queen	Sarah Hyland		Recurring	
Seelie Queen	Kimberly-Sue Murray			Recurring
Heidi McKenzie	Tessa Mossey		Guest	Recurring
Aline Penhallow	Eileen Li		Guest	
Aline Penhallow	Jacky Lai			Recurring
Catarina Loss	Sophia Walker		Guest	Recurring
Ithuriel	Alec Stockwell		Guest	
Ithuriel	Benjamin Sutherland		Guest	Guest
Lilith	Tara Westwood		Guest	
Lilith	Anna Hopkins			Recurring
Lorenzo Rey	Javier Muñoz			Recurring
Jordan Kyle	Chai Hansen			Recurring
Jia Penhallow	Françoise Yip			Recurring
Brother Zachariach	Jonathan Ho			Recurring
Asmodeus	Jack J. Yang			Recurring
Helen Blackthorn	Sydney Meyer			Recurring

== Main characters ==
=== Clary Fairchild ===
Clary Fairchild
- The Mortal Instruments character Shadowhunters character
- First appearance: Novels: City of Bones (2007); Film: The Mortal Instruments: City of Bones (2013); Television: "The Mortal Cup" (1.01)
- Last appearance: Novels: Queen of Air and Darkness (2018)
- Created by: Cassandra Clare
- Portrayed by: Lily Collins (film); Katherine McNamara (television)

In-universe information
- Full name: Clarissa Adele Fairchild; Clarissa Adele Fray (former)
- Nicknames: Clary; Biscuit
- Species: Shadowhunter
- Gender: Female
- Occupation: Shadowhunter (novels)
- Family: Oscar Morgenstern † (paternal grandfather); Seraphina Morgenstern † (paternal grandmother); Granville Fairchild II † (maternal grandfather); Adele Fairchild † (maternal grandmother); Valentine Morgenstern † (father); Jocelyn Fray (mother); Jonathan Morgenstern † (brother) Luke Garroway (stepfather); Henry Branwell (ancestor); Charlotte Fairchild (ancestor)
- Significant others: Jace Herondale (fiancé); Simon Lewis (best friend / ex-boyfriend / parabatai)
- Born: August 23, 1991 (age 34); Manhattan, New York, U.S.
- Residence: The New York Institute; Park Slope, Brooklyn (former)
- Abilities: Art; Use of heavenly weapons Nephilim physiology Runic magic Angelic blood empowerment The Sight; Parabatai bond

Clarissa Adele "Clary" Fairchild is a fictional character and the main protagonist of The Mortal Instruments series. She is the daughter of Valentine Morgenstern and Jocelyn Fairchild, stepdaughter of Lucian Graymark. She is also the sister to Jonathan Christopher 'Sebastian' Morgenstern.

While at a New York City nightclub, the Pandemonium, she is stunned to observe a group of teenagers stalk and attack a supposed 'human' and tries to stop them. She learns their names are Jace, Alec and Isabelle. They reveal that the man was truly a demon and hint themselves to be a part of a Supernatural community called the 'Shadowhunters'. She thinks that they are all mad at first but stalls when she sees when the 'human' the Shadowhunters were stalking suddenly grows claws and strange eyes and disappears when killed. She had called the security of the place before, and when they come, she soon realizes that she is the only person able to see them.

After the battle, Clary is introduced to the group of teens, who identify themselves as Shadowhunters, a race of humans who are physically enhanced with angel blood and secretly protect humanity from demons. When her mother Jocelyn goes missing, Clary learns that the event is connected to the conflict between the Shadowhunters and their enemies. She then enters the Shadowhunter fold and there she finds that she also is a Shadowhunter. Her mother had paid the warlock Magnus Bane to put a block in her head so she could not remember parts of the Shadow World even moments after she sees it. She and the group of Shadowhunters try to find hints to find her mother. In the process, she falls in love with fellow Shadowhunter Jace Wayland.

Clary learns that Valentine Morgenstern, who is supposed to be long dead but truly is not, the main antagonist of the series, is her biological father and her mother's husband. At the end of City of Bones, Valentine tells them that Clary and Jace are siblings — which, as they discover later in the series, is a lie. In the second book of the series, City of Ashes, Clary dates her best friend Simon, who has for a long time had a crush on her, to forget Jace during the torturous time of believing him to be her brother. She is told by the Seelie Queen that she and Jace are Valentine's experiments but mysteriously does not explain further. She finds out later that she was exposed to powdered angel blood through her mother who consumed it unknowingly while she was pregnant with Clary. This angelic blood granted her the ability to create runes that do not exist and amplify the power of existing runes for herself. At the end of the second novel, Clary finds that an old friend of her mother, Madeleine, knows how to wake her mother, who has been in a magical coma since the first book.

In City of Glass, it is discovered that Jocelyn had taken a potion, made by a warlock named Ragnor Fell, to induce a comatose state and prevent her from being interrogated by Valentine. Before she dies, Madeleine tells Clary she needs to find Fell, who will help her cure her mother. Clary, using her power to create runes, creates a rune with the ability to create a Portal a magic and conveys herself and Luke to Idris, and falls into Lake Lyn and drinks some of the water by accident; this causes her to hallucinate because the lake's water is poisonous to Shadowhunters. Luke then takes her to his sister Amatis for healing.

During her stay in Alicante, Clary ventures to find Ragnor Fell, who will be able to help her with the potion. She is escorted there by Sebastian Verlac, whom she recently met, in an attempt to make contact with Fell. Instead, she finds Magnus Bane. He tells her of Ragnor's death and how he was called as a replacement and requests that she find him the Book of White in return for his help. She returns to Alicante, where Sebastian kisses her. She rejects him after having feelings of "wrong" while he kissed her, and they continue back to Alicante. She then learns that something called the Book of White has been hidden in Wayland Manor, and travels with Jace to retrieve it. Inside the Manor, they find the angel Ithuriel tied up and left for dead in the basement. He gives both Shadowhunters visions of Valentine experimenting on his children with the demon and his angel blood in an attempt to make a stronger warrior.

They escape from Wayland Manor, after freeing Ithuriel so that he can finally die; the two then share a moment of passionate romance. They return to Alicante to see it burning from the first assault on the city, and after things are in order, Clary meets with the others and they go to free Simon who was taken to a Conclave prison called The Guard. They return to see the Clave, and Clary uses her rune ability to create a binding rune, enabling Shadowhunters and Downworlders to share powers. All those of age go to the battle on Brocelind Plains, and Clary has to give Simon the Mark of Cain so that the vampires will join the fight.

At last, Magnus wakes Clary's mother Jocelyn, who informs Clary that Jace isn't her brother. Her real brother is Jonathan Morgenstern, who has, this whole time, pretended to be Sebastian. It is soon revealed that Sebastian is a spy for Valentine and that he tried to seduce Clary into teaming up with him. Clary then tries to locate Jace to help him. She runs into Valentine, who ties her down in order to complete his summoning of the Angel Raziel by using her blood. Then, when Jace arrives to rescue her, Valentine forces her to watch as he fatally stabs Jace in the chest. Upon summoning the angel, Clary changes the marks on Valentine's summoning circle, giving her the ability to control the Angel, and after Valentine is slain, wishes to have Jace back. After Jace is brought back to life, the two get together.

In the fourth book, City of Fallen Angels, Clary and Jace are happily in love. But soon, Jace starts to behave strangely and avoids her, leading Clary to assume he wants to break up with her. In truth, he has been influenced by Lilith, mother of all demons and former wife of Adam before Eve, who sent him dreams in which he kills or hurts Clary, because when he was raised from the dead by Raziel, all of his protections placed on him at birth were stripped away, leaving him vulnerable to demonic influence. During the party, when Lucian's pack celebrated his engagement with Clary's mother Jocelyn, she is kidnapped by a fully possessed Jace and taken to Lilith. There, she learns her brother Jonathan Christopher Morgenstern/Sebastian Verlac is going to be raised from the dead by Simon, who is blackmailed by Lilith for the life of Clary, and she was brought just to make him do that. Using Jace's affection for her (which remains undiminished because his possession has no effect on that part of him), she cuts the rune which enabled Lilith to control him. Jace and Lilith fight fiercely until Lilith stops him by torturing Clary. Seeing his chance, Simon comes in the way of Lilith's blow to Clary, the Mark of Cain possessed by him returns the blow sevenfold to Lilith, destroying her. After Lilith's destruction, Isabelle and Alec appear on the scene, but Jace shoos them away since he doesn't want to be consoled as he feels terrible for hurting Clary, in spite of the fact that he wasn't himself. Alec then shoves Clary back to the room as they get into the elevator, feeling that only she can help him. Clary and Jace reaffirm their love after she convinces him he is not a horrible person. The last words Clary says to him before going down are, "I'll be back. Five minutes," and they share a kiss before she leaves and comes back to find him gone, unaware his rune has healed and he is possessed once again.

In the fifth book of the series, City of Lost Souls, Clary has realized that Jace has gone away with Sebastian Morgenstern. The Clave was alarmed by the sudden disappearance of Sebastian and Jace and started to search for any signs of them, after two weeks of repeating the same statement about what happened at the rooftop, before Clary left him with Sebastian, alive by Simon's blood. But other problems come to the Clave and it has to set aside the search for Jonathan. Clary is outraged by the news. Using the bell given to her by Kaelie Whitewillow, a waitress and subject of the Queen's, she goes to the Seelie Queen's palace where she has to beg for help due to the limited resources. The Seelie Queen has requested that Clary is allowed to steal the faerie rings kept inside the institute. Clary steals the rings but doesn't give them to the Queen because of the appearance of Jace and Sebastian at the library, all healthy looking and safe. Afterwards, Clary accepts their offer of coming to them.

When the plan of Sebastian was finally revealed to her, she couldn't believe what could happen. When Sebastian finds her communicating with Simon through the Faerie rings, he fights her and attempts to rape her. At the enchantment ceremony, she was surprised when Amatis was turned into a dark Shadowhunter by the blood of Lilith. At the same time, Magnus, Alec, Maryse, Isabelle, and Simon arrived, with Glorious in hand. When Glorious was handed to her, she struck Jace, the mark of Lilith burning, making him cry out in pain.

In the epilogue, she was concerned why she couldn't visit Jace because of her thoughts telling her she almost killed Jace, but reassured by Isabelle she didn't do anything to make Jace mad. She visited Jace, but she almost thought she wasn't going to be allowed to go in due to Brother Zachariah. By the consent of Brother Zachariah, she entered, hugging Jace and reaffirming their relationship.

Finally in City of Heavenly Fire, Sebastian has taken many shadowhunters and turned them into his Endarkened. The remaining shadowhunters retreat to Idris for safety. Sebastian offers to leave them alone if he is given Clary and Jace. Before the Clave can make a decision Clary, Jace, Simon, Isabelle and Alec sneak off to Edom, the demon realm Sebastian is hiding in; he has Jocelyn, Luke, Magnus and Raphael prisoner. After spending days trying to find him they come upon his castle, a dark version of Alicante. Sebastian offers Clary a place next to him, in exchange for leaving everyone she knows and all of the Shadowhunters alone. She accepts it, knowing that she has to keep everyone safe. When Sebastian is momentarily distracted she stabs him with the Morgenstern blade, containing Heavenly Fire. He is returned to the brother that she could have had before he then dies.

The group manage to escape after Simon gives up his immortality and memories of the Shadow World to Magnus Banes's father, Asmodeus. Months later Clary talks to him but he doesn't remember her. At her mother and Luke's wedding, Simon tells her he remembers her. She and Jace are happy, as the others; they are coping with all the losses of the dark war. After all that Jace finally finds out what Sebastian did to Clary.

Physical appearance

Clary is 5'2" with curly red hair, green eyes, pale skin, and freckles. She is said to look like her mother, who is described as beautiful and small. Clary sometimes doubts the fact that she is as beautiful as her mother, believing herself to be a duller version of her mother, with less defined features. She is rather small and thin. She is described by Jace many times throughout the series as "delicate".

She is portrayed by Lily Collins in the film adaptation of the book and Katherine McNamara in the television series.

She gained her ability to create runes when Valentine fed her mother angel blood while she was in the womb.

Appearances in books

- City of Bones (2007)
- City of Ashes (2008)
- City of Glass (2009)
- City of Fallen Angels (2011)
- City of Lost Souls (2012)
- City of Heavenly Fire (2014)
- Tales from the Shadowhunter Academy (2015)
- Lady Midnight (2016)
- Lord of Shadows (2017)
- Queen of Air and Darkness (2018)
- Lost Book of White

=== Jace Herondale ===
Jace Herondale
- The Mortal Instruments character Shadowhunters character
- First appearance: Novels: City of Bones (2007); Film: The Mortal Instruments: City of Bones (2013); Television: "The Mortal Cup" (1.01)
- Last appearance: Novels: Queen of Air and Darkness (2018)
- Created by: Cassandra Clare
- Portrayed by: Jamie Campbell Bower (film); Dominic Sherwood (television)

In-universe information
- Full name: Jonathan Christopher Wayland (former); Jonathan Christopher Morgenstern (former); Jonathan Christopher Lightwood (former); Jonathan Herondale. His proper name should be Jace Lightwood or Jace Herondale. In the series, he does not like being called Jonathan.
- Nickname: Jace
- Species: Shadowhunter
- Gender: Male
- Occupation: Shadowhunters trainer (novels)
- Family: Imogen Herondale † (paternal grandmother); Stephen Herondale † (biological father); Céline Herondale † (biological mother); Valentine Morgenstern (adoptive father); Maryse Lightwood (adoptive mother); Robert Lightwood (adoptive father); Alec Lightwood (adoptive brother and parabatai); Isabelle Lightwood (adoptive sister); Max Lightwood (adoptive brother)
- Significant others: Clary Fairchild (fiancée) Himself (stated many times, narcissism)

Jonathan Christopher "Jace" Herondale is a Shadowhunter living at the New York Institute with his adopted family, the Lightwoods. Jace's legal name changes throughout the series, from Jace Wayland (when his father is thought to be Michael Wayland), to Jonathan Morgenstern (when thought to be Valentine's son), to Jace Lightwood for the family that has taken him in, to Jace Herondale (when his true father is revealed to be Stephen Herondale). His mother was the young Céline Herondale, a member of Valentine's inner circle with Stephen Herondale, his father. Jace did not like being called Jonathan. He was either Jace Herondale or Jace Lightwood.

The nickname "Jace" was given to him by Maryse Lightwood after his (fake) initials J.C. (Jonathan Christopher, because no one but Valentine and Jocelyn knew Jace was not his real son), when he first began living with Maryse Lightwood and her family, because of his dislike for his name. Jace was given the blood of an angel named Ithuriel by Valentine when Celiné was pregnant with him. This gave him enhanced abilities, even compared to regular Shadowhunters, such as enhanced durability, enhanced speed, and enhanced stealth.

For most of the books, Jace's sarcastic, cold remarks and behavior hide his tortured and angry soul. In City of Ashes, his strong "bad-boy" personality makes Maryse Lightwood (his adoptive mother) somewhat scared of him, realising his alikeness to Valentine, who was believed to be his real father until the assumption was proven false in City of Glass. Jace and Clary fall in love in City of Bones, making Clary the only girl Jace has developed real genuine feelings for, but after they find out they are "siblings", each attempts to get over the other by dating other people. He is naturally overprotective and caring for her, although Clary does not see this due to her internal suffering. At the end of the third novel, City of Glass, Jocelyn contradicts Valentine's avowal that Jace and Clary are siblings, telling Clary that Jace is actually the son of Celine and Stephen Herondale. The truth frees Jace and Clary from the torture of having seemingly incestuous feelings for each other, allowing them to accept their mutual feelings and become a "real" couple.

By Lady Midnight, the first book in the third series (The Dark Artifices) of Shadowhunters, Jace has proposed to Clary. They are 23 and 24 respectively. However, she refuses him, because she believes that she is going to die (she has been having visions of her lying dead, and Jace is crying over her dead body). Clary admits to Emma at the beginning of the second book, Lord of Shadows, that Jace has, in fact, proposed to her, but she is afraid that she will die, leaving Jace without his love/ wife. Since she considers marriage as a promise of staying, she refuses his proposal in order to focus on their mission. By Queen of Air And Darkness, however, we discover that she had, in fact, been having visions of Thule, where Jace is Endarkened and Clary is dead. Clary proposes to Jace, and he agrees. We see the chapter end on them kissing, and the Midnight Flower opens in front of them, unnoticed.

Physical appearance

Jace has wavy dark golden-blond hair and dark golden eyes. He has a slim, muscular build, and is about 5'11". His face is described as being pretty and angular, and Clary often refers to him as beautiful and leonine, with a narrow mouth. His eyes were much lighter in City of Bones, City of Ashes, and City of Glass; Clary describes his eyes and hair as darker in City of Fallen Angels. His eyes are brown with flecks of gold that lighten and darken with his moods. In The Bane Chronicles; Magnus describes Jace as being the gold to Alec's silver.

Like all other Shadowhunters, he is covered in thin, pale scars from years of applying various magical runes with a stele for battle and healing purposes. It is said that Jace is seventeen years old, though that was assuming he was Valentine (or Michael Wayland's) son, and his real age is between a few years younger than Jonathan Christopher and a year or so older than Clary. Jace is also left-handed (like Valentine). He has often said (and tried to prove) that the only trait he got from his father was his attitude. He is described to be extremely good looking. Jace is portrayed by Jamie Campbell Bower in the film adaptation of the book and Dominic Sherwood in the television series.

Family

In City of Bones, Jace lives with his adoptive family, the Lightwoods, and is seen as the brother of the Lightwood children. Later, he is told that he is the son of Valentine and Jocelyn Morgenstern, and not Michael Wayland as he had been told. At this time, he is also told that Clary Fray is his sister. Eventually, it is revealed that he is actually Stephen Herondale and Celine Herondale's son and that Clary is not related to him.

==== Appearances in books ====
- City of Bones
- City of Ashes
- City of Glass
- City of Fallen Angels
- City of Lost Souls
- City of Heavenly Fire
- Tales from the Shadowhunter Academy
- The Bane Chronicles (mentioned)
- Lady Midnight
- A History of Notable Shadowhunters & Denizens of the Downworld
- Queen of Air and Darkness (2018)
- Lost Book of White

=== Simon Lewis ===
Simon Lewis Lovelace
- The Mortal Instruments character Shadowhunters character
- First appearance: Novels: City of Bones (2007); Film: The Mortal Instruments: City of Bones (2013); Television: "The Mortal Cup" (1.01)
- Last appearance: Queen of Air and Darkness (2018)
- Created by: Cassandra Clare
- Portrayed by: Robert Sheehan (film); Alberto Rosende (television)

In-universe information
- Full name: Simon Lewis
- Nicknames: Si; Daylighter; Simon Lovelace
- Species: Mundane (former); Vampire (former); Shadowhunter
- Gender: Male
- Occupation: Band member (former) Artist
- Family: Levi Lewis † (father); Elaine Lewis (mother); Rebecca Lewis (sister)
- Significant others: Isabelle Lightwood (Fiancée); Clary Fairchild (ex-girlfriend/ best friend); Maia Roberts (ex-girlfriend)
- Parabatai: Clary Fairchild
- Born: October 17, 1990 (age 35)
- Residence: The New York Institute; Shadowhunter Academy, Idris (former); Brooklyn, New York (former)
- Abilities: Archery; Use of heavenly weapons Nephilim physiology Runic magic Angelic blood empowerment The Sight; Parabatai bond Mark of Cain (former); Immortality (former); Resurrection (former); Shape-shifting (former); Superhuman strength and speed (former); Heightened senses (former); Fascination (former); Healing (former)

Simon Lewis is Clary's best friend. He accompanies Clary in her adventures, despite being human for the first book and most of the second book. Simon eventually becomes a Shadowhunter and he and Clary become Parabatai. Along the way Simon falls for Isabelle Lightwood and he proposes to her and she says yes. He is portrayed by Robert Sheehan in the film and by Alberto Rosende in the television series.

Family

His family is said to be devoutly Jewish. Not much is said about Simon's family. It is mentioned that his father died when he was very young due to a heart attack. His mother, Elaine Lewis, becomes a more prominent character in City of Fallen Angels when she discovers that Simon is a vampire and kicks him out of the house. Upon leaving, he puts her in a trance, hoping to talk to her at a later date. He also has a sister named Rebecca who is a few years older than he is. In City of Lost Souls, he admits to his sister that he is a vampire despite his fear of her shutting him out like his mother. Rebecca accepts him, and the two stay in contact.

Elaine Lewis is portrayed by Christina Cox, and Rebecca is portrayed by Holly Deveaux in the television series.

Character development

In City of Bones, he is kidnapped by vampires after being turned into a rat and brought to their lair in the abandoned Hotel Dumort. Later, in City of Ashes, he begins to feel some side effects as a result of biting Raphael, the temporary head vampire while he was a rat. Because he is human and doesn't know the correct way to become a vampire, he begins to fear that he may be turning into a monster.

When he cannot reconcile his feelings for Clary, he returns to the hotel—putting himself in great danger—to ask them if he is becoming one of them. Unfortunately, the vampires attack, and Raphael saves him from immediate death by bringing him back to the institute, where Clary is staying. Faced with the choice of letting Simon die or making him a vampire, Clary and Jace decide to let him be reborn as a vampire. In City of Ashes, he becomes a "Daylighter" after being drained of most of his blood on Valentine's ship by Valentine so he can complete his Conversion on Maellartach, The Soul-Sword. Jace finds Simon on the brink of death and allows him to drink his blood to revive him. The large quantity of Angel blood in Jace's body then allows Simon to stand in high sun with no risk of burning, unlike all other vampires who cannot.

After Max Lightwood's death, Isabelle (Max's older sister) becomes distraught, blaming herself for not listening to him and for not being there for her little brother. She refused to see anyone, finally allowing Simon to come in. Simon comforts Isabelle, trying to convince her that Max's death wasn't her fault, and ends up sleeping next to her, much to his surprise, although they do nothing sexual. Towards the end of the third novel, Raphael demands Simon's death in exchange for his clan's assistance for the war; Raphael believes Simon's Daylighter powers make him too dangerous to remain alive. In order to protect him, Clary draws the Mark of Cain on Simon, which prevents him from being harmed by anyone and also curses him, marking him as a wanderer for eternity.

In City of Fallen Angels, a conflicted Simon tries casually dating both Isabelle and Maia. When the girls find out, they both leave him, and he is alone once more. However, by the end of the book it is clear that a deepening relationship is forming between Simon and Isabelle.

In City of Lost Souls, Simon loses his Mark of Cain to the Angel Raziel in exchange for the sword "Glorious" to save Jace by separating him and Sebastian. Throughout the book, Simon and Isabelle's relationship progresses to the point where she trusts him enough to let him bite her when he is hungry. They spend nights together, much to Alec's horror. However, they still don't consider themselves dating for neither has confessed that they want to. Simon thinks he will just be dumped like the rest of Isabelle's boyfriends while Isabelle has trouble revealing her feelings and thinks Simon should make the first move.

In City of Heavenly Fire, Simon admits his love to Isabelle. Throughout the book, Simon follows Clary and Jace—along with Isabelle and Alec—into the demon realm Edom to defeat Sebastian and find Magnus, Raphael, Luke and Jocelyn. In the demon realm, he saves Isabelle after she is bitten by a demon. Soon after, he tells Isabelle he loves her. As a result, they finally make their relationship official. At the end, after defeating Sebastian, they have no possible way of getting out. Magnus calls on his father, Asmodeus, who asks to help them get out of Edom since Sebastian closed all possible ways for them to get out. In return, Asmodeus wants Magnus' immortal life – if Magnus does this, he will die. None of them want Magnus to sacrifice his life, so Simon steps forward. Because Simon has only just become a vampire, his years will not catch up to him and he will return a mundane. But to spice up the deal, Asmodeus also says he must take away all of Simon's memory of the Shadow world and of Clary. Everything he will remember will be a normal life, a life without Clary, or Jace, or Alec, or Magnus and Isabelle. This devastated them all, but Simon gave it willingly to save his friends and the person he loves. In the Epilogue, Clary tries to see if Simon remembers her, but he doesn't and just thinks she's a crazy girl with tattoos. Except, he does give her his band flyer thinking she might be hitting on him. She walks away with it. Clary gives Izzy the flyer and walks away. The flyer says the band's name, "The Mortal Instruments". With this sliver of hope, Izzy and Magnus go to Simon and tell him what has happened. Simon is given the choice for Magnus to prep him to Ascend and become a Shadowhunter so that Asmodeus cannot touch him and he can regain all of his memory. Simon agrees and receives some of his memory back. He then reunites with Clary, Izzy, and the rest of the clan at Jocelyn and Luke's wedding. In Tales From the Shadowhunter Academy, Simon trains as a shadowhunter and becomes Clary's parabatai.

==== Appearances in books ====
- City of Bones
- City of Ashes
- City of Glass
- City of Fallen Angels
- City of Lost Souls
- City of Heavenly Fire
- Tales from the Shadowhunter Academy
- A History of Notable Shadowhunters & Denizens of the Downworld
- Lost Book of White

=== Luke Garroway ===
Luke Garroway
- The Mortal Instruments character Shadowhunters character
- First appearance: Novels: City of Bones (2007); Film: The Mortal Instruments: City of Bones (2013); Television: "The Mortal Cup" (1.01)
- Last appearance: A History of Notable Shadowhunters & Denizens of the Downworld (2016)
- Created by: Cassandra Clare
- Portrayed by: Aidan Turner (film); Isaiah Mustafa (television)

In-universe information
- Full name: Lucian Graymark (former); Luke Garroway
- Species: Shadowhunter (former); Werewolf

Luke Garroway (birth name Lucian Graymark) is Jocelyn Fray's best friend who later becomes her husband and step-father to Clary Fray. He is a werewolf who was a Shadowhunter and member of the Circle which was run by Valentine Morgenstern.

In his early life, Lucian was raised in Idris with his mother and older sister Amatis. Later, his mother left to join the Iron Sisters, leaving Luke to be raised by his sister. When Luke was young, he met Jocelyn Fairchild (Jocelyn Fray) and they were later sent to Alicante to train and attend school. When they arrived at Alicante, Luke wasn't the best in school and often contemplated quitting, until Valentine Morgenstern offered to tutor him.

Lycanthropy

Before Luke turned into a Werewolf, he was a Shadowhunter, Valentine had invited Luke to go hunting to help clean out the werewolves' nests that had killed Valentine's father, while they were scouting out the nests, a werewolf bit Luke. After he was bitten, Luke wasn't sure if the bite was enough to infect him with Lycanthropy. At one point, he went seeking aid from his sister Amatis for help and shelter and was sent away. He, along with Jocelyn and Valentine had kept quiet in following weeks while they awaited for the full moon. To his dismay, he did Change after the attack. Valentine then took him to the forest and gave Luke his father's dagger and told him to be honorable and kill himself. Valentine then led everyone to believe that Luke was dead.

Instead Luke sought out the werewolf that had turned him to kill him and himself in the process. When Luke finally found him, he turned out to be the leader of a pack in Brocelind Forest. Luke had fought and killed him. By werewolf law, Luke had become the new pack leader, and accepted the position and began his new life.

Physical appearance

Luke has blue eyes and brown, uneven hair with ragged-looking clothes. He is tall, with squared shoulders and wears glasses. His favorite shirts to wear are flannel shirts. He is portrayed by Aidan Turner in the film adaptation of the book, and Isaiah Mustafa in the television series.

==== Appearances in books ====
- City of Bones
- City of Ashes
- City of Glass
- City of Fallen Angels
- City of Lost Souls
- City of Heavenly Fire
- A History of Notable Shadowhunters & Denizens of the Downworld

=== Isabelle Lightwood ===
Isabelle Sophia "Izzy" Lightwood is a Shadowhunter and lives in the New York Institute. She was born on May 31, is the younger sister of Alec and Jace and is older than Max. Passionate and with a high sense of fashion. She is rebellious and very beautiful. Her cooking is often made fun of by Jace and Alec. She is known to be dangerous and often carries weapons in her tall boots that are never less than seven inches.

Her signature weapon is an electrum whip with which she is quite skilled. She dresses well, as shown when she gave Clary to wear clothes that she picked for Magnus's party. She is shown to take responsibility for situations, shouldering the blame for her brother Max's death, despite having been struck unconscious at the time. She is comforted by Simon, and ends up sleeping (in a literal, non-sexual sense) with him. She begins to casually date Simon—who is also dating Maia at the same time—and then later upon finding out about Maia, breaks up with him. After this and seeing how she is genuinely hurt by it, begins to slowly realize that she may actually be in love with Simon, but refuses to admit it.

Izzy obviously cares for Jace and Alec, and is fiercely protective of both of them. Because of this, she is constantly torn over the fact that her brother is struggling with his sexuality and when Jace is heartbroken over Clary during their supposedly sibling relationship. In City of Glass, she yells at Clary for only thinking of herself and not realizing how much pain Jace is in due to how much he really loves her.

Physical appearance

Isabelle is very beautiful and tall. She has very dark brown eyes with hints of gold that initially appear to be black. She is curvaceous and has long black hair that is described as "black as spilt ink" by Clary. She dresses stylishly, often with high heels. However, she despised her height and hated towering over everyone and wished to be small and delicate like Clary.

She is portrayed by Jemima West in the film adaptation of the book, and Emeraude Toubia in the television series.

Family

Isabelle is the middle child in the Lightwood family. Her parents are Maryse and Robert Lightwood, who were once in the Circle with Valentine until the Uprising. Her older brother is Alec and her younger brother was Max, who died at the hand of Jonathan Christopher Morgenstern. Jace is her adoptive brother. Her parents run the Institute in New York.

==== Appearances in books ====
- City of Bones
- City of Ashes
- City of Glass
- City of Fallen Angels
- City of Lost Souls
- City of Heavenly Fire
- Tales from the Shadowhunter Academy
- A History of Notable Shadowhunters & Denizens of the Downworld
- Lost Book of White

=== Alec Lightwood ===
Alexander "Alec" Gideon Lightwood was born on September 10; he is the son of Robert & Maryse Lightwood, and older brother of Isabelle 'Izzy' and Max Lightwood; he shares a vincule with his adopted brother Jace Herondale who is his Parabatai. He lives in the New York Institute with his siblings. Soft-spoken and serious, he tries his best to act wisely and is not as reckless as Jace. For much of the series, Alec denies his homosexuality and attraction to males (particularly Jace & Magnus), which results in him lashing out at people. When he finally accepts himself, he becomes more relaxed and comes out as gay to the whole Clave and everyone there, including his family and parents, by publicly passionately kissing Magnus. Alec becomes a much more central character in City of Lost Souls and is one of the book's narrators.

He was portrayed by Kevin Zegers in the film adaptation of the book and Matthew Daddario in the television series.

==== Appearances in books ====
- City of Bones
- City of Ashes
- City of Glass
- City of Fallen Angels
- City of Lost Souls
- City of Heavenly Fire
- Lady Midnight
- Lord of Shadows
- Queen of Air and Darkness
- Tales from the Shadowhunter Academy
- The Bane Chronicles
- A History of Notable Shadowhunters & Denizens of the Downworld
- The Red Scrolls of Magic
- Lost Book of White

=== Magnus Bane ===
Magnus Bane is the (former) High Warlock of Brooklyn. He regularly tampered with the mind of Clary Fray after designing a spell that would erase her memories of the Shadow World once every two years as a favour to her mother, Jocelyn. He first meets the other Shadowhunters at one of his Downworlder parties. He later has Clary retrieve the Book of the White for him in City of Glass, and agrees to help revive her mother with it. In City of Heavenly Fire, he admits to Alec that he is almost 400 years old, although he often lies about his age. He wears much makeup, such as glitter around his eyes and blue lipstick, and likes to flaunt his bisexuality by wearing flashy and sometimes bizarre clothing. However, despite his flamboyant appearance and whimsical personality, he is a kind yet jaded person who yearns for love and acceptance, but has great trouble revealing his honest desires and personal secrets to others due to his long and traumatic past. His life has frequently been entangled with the fates of certain Shadowhunters, but he doesn't become closely involved with the workings of their society and their struggle for survival and reformation until he meets Alec Lightwood, who goes on to become the love of his life. In City of Heavenly Fire, his father is revealed to be Asmodeus, the Greater Demon of Lust and ruler of Edom.

Physical appearance

Magnus Bane is described as being of Asian descent, due to his human parent being half-Dutch, half-Indonesian. He is said to be lean, but not skinny, with lightly muscled arms. He has brown skin and black, nearly shoulder-length hair that is usually styled and dyed. He is said to be about 19 years old, physically. He is portrayed by Godfrey Gao in the film adaptation of the book, and Harry Shum Jr. in the television series by Freeform.

==== Appearances in books ====
- City of Bones
- City of Ashes
- City of Glass
- City of Fallen Angels
- City of Lost Souls
- City of Heavenly Fire
- The Bane Chronicles
- Tales from the Shadowhunter Academy
- Clockwork Angel
- Clockwork Prince
- Clockwork Princess
- Lady Midnight
- Lord of Shadows
- Queen of Air and Darkness
- Ghosts of the Shadow market
- A History of Notable Shadowhunters & Denizens of the Downworld
- The Red Scrolls Of Magic

=== Maia Roberts ===
Maia Roberts is a biracial teenager born and raised in a New Jersey suburban neighborhood. She was abused by her brother, Daniel, as a child, leading her to hating and fearing some boys, even after her brother's death. In tenth-eleventh grade, Maia met Jordan Kyle and they began dating. However, during their relationship, he soon began to become controlling and abusive and she broke up with him. He became enraged at her break up with him and, in werewolf form, attacked her on her way home from a party. (She was a mundane and did not know that he was a werewolf or anything about the Shadow World.) Jordan vanished shortly afterward, and Maia soon turned into a werewolf on the next full moon. She ran away from home and joined the wolf-pack in New York and became good friends with Luke, the leader of the pack. She became associated with the Shadowhunters and develops a crush on Simon, and in City of Glass gets into a competition with Isabelle for his attention.

Maia is described as having curly, brown and gold hair (her eyelashes are described as the color of toast), light brown skin and amber-brown eyes. She is also described as having a heart-shaped face and rather curvy figure. She is portrayed by Alisha Wainwright in the television series.

==== Appearances ====
- City of Ashes
- City of Glass
- City of Fallen Angels
- City of Lost Souls
- City of Heavenly Fire
- A History of Notable Shadowhunters & Denizens of the Downworld

=== Jocelyn Fairchild/Morgenstern ===
Jocelyn Morgenstern/Fairchild/Fray/Garroway/Graymark is Clary's mother and a former Shadowhunter. Jocelyn grew up in Idris with Luke, Valentine, and the other Circle members. She was married to Valentine at the age of 19, though she says she married him because she loved him, she later realized that he was torturing innocent people. She fled Idris when she found out she was pregnant with Clary, so he could not do harm to her daughter like he did on Jonathan (Sebastian), her first-born son. Later it is said that Luke tracked her down and Clary, being around the age of 3–5 at the time though it does not specify, opened the door to him. He then stayed in their lives and he and Jocelyn lived their lives in New York, also taking a large part in raising Clary, until Jocelyn is located by Valentine. She takes a potion, putting herself in a coma to protect her secrets and remains unconscious until she is revived by Magnus Bane in City of Glass. She is also a Shadowhunter warrior.

In City of Glass, after Valentine was killed by the angel Raziel, Lucian Graymark (Luke) finally declared his love for her, telling her he's been in love with her for over 20 years. After he walks out the door, initially believing she did not return his feelings, she soon runs after him to tell she loves him too. It is then later revealed in City of Fallen Angels that they are engaged to be married and also are "disgustingly in love" as described by Clary. Later in City of Lost Souls, after Luke is wounded by Sebastian and in critical condition, Jocelyn says to him how she regrets failing to have noticed his feelings for her back when they were younger and wishes he would have told her how he felt about her so she would have married "the right guy" instead of Valentine. Hence things would have been "different" and could have turned out better than they were currently. However, Luke doesn't have any regrets saying how if things had been any different, "they" wouldn't have Clary, making Jocelyn happy since he said "as though he was sure Clary was his own daughter".

Jocelyn is described of being elegant and beautiful, with long red hair. She is portrayed by Lena Headey in the film adaptation of the book and Maxim Roy in the television series.

==== Family ====
Jocelyn has two children, Jonathan Christopher and Clarissa Adele. Her parents were killed in a fire set by Valentine Morgenstern, in which she also believed that Jonathan had been killed. She is engaged to Lucian Graymark (Luke) as of City of Lost Souls, and they were married in City of Heavenly Fire.

==== Appearances in books ====
- City of Bones
- City of Ashes (mentioned)
- City of Glass
- City of Fallen Angels
- City of Lost Souls
- City of Heavenly Fire
- A History of Notable Shadowhunters & Denizens of the Downworld

=== Valentine Morgenstern ===
Valentine Morgenstern is the main antagonist of the first half of the series, and is the former husband of Jocelyn Fairchild. This also makes him biological father to Clarissa Morgenstern and Jonathan Christopher Morgenstern (also known as Sebastian). In his youth he was a very skilled Shadowhunter from a rich family in Alicante. His best friend was Lucian Graymark while they were in school, among other Shadowhunters including Maryse Lightwood (née Trueblood), Robert Lightwood, Hodge Starkweather, Stephen Herondale and Michael Wayland. Upon the death of his father, Valentine fell in love with Jocelyn Fairchild, and together he and his group of young Shadowhunters formed the infamous group known as the Circle. With him leading the Circle, they had intended to share the gift of the Nephilim with the rest of humanity by using the Mortal Cup. Valentine and Jocelyn married and all was well until his ideas for the Circle became more radical, as Valentine wanted to kill all Downworlders. He infects his son with Demon blood and is betrayed by his former best friend, Lucian Graymark, and his wife at the Uprising of the Accords. Upon fleeing the battle, Valentine is assumed to be dead and goes into hiding with his son and Jace Herondale.

Years later, when City of Bones begins, Valentine finds Jocelyn and wants her to reveal where the Mortal Cup is located. He kidnaps her, but is unable to extract information from her due to her self-induced comatose state. He eventually secures the Mortal Cup, and the Mortal Sword and goes to the Mortal Mirror to summon the Angel Raziel. His arrogance, however, as well as his torturing of the angel Ithuriel, Raziel's brother, causes the angel to slay him. During the series, it is also revealed he faked his death and took on the name of Michael Wayland, raising Jace Herondale as Jace Wayland.

Physical appearance

Valentine is said to be tall and very handsome. He is broad-shouldered and has light blond, almost silver hair. He also has black eyes. Though in the movie he has dark brown hair and blue eyes.

He is portrayed by Jonathan Rhys Meyers in the film adaptation of the book and Alan van Sprang in the television series.

Family

Valentine is the former husband of Jocelyn Fairchild, with whom he had two children (Clarissa "Clary" Adele Morgenstern and Jonathan Christopher Morgenstern). Clarissa realizes that she is Valentine's daughter in the first book, City of Bones, but being raised by Jocelyn her whole life is void of Valentine's influence. His son however, was tutored by him to be a very talented Shadowhunter and ruthless killer. He later becomes Valentine's spy, taking the name Sebastian Verlac. Valentine also adopts Jace Herondale as his son, training him as well as Jonathan, making him as skilled a Shadowhunter as Jonathan.

Valentine also experimented on his children. Hoping to make a stronger and better Shadowhunter, he infused Jonathan with demon blood while in Jocelyn's womb. However, a side effect of the blood was that it would "burn out his [Jonathan's] humanity as poison burns the life from blood." This gave him a son capable of incredible feats, but with little to no compassion or ability to love. The experimentation on Jonathan led to Jocelyn feeling sick and very depressed. To make her feel better he gave her powdered Angel blood, not knowing that she was carrying a second child (Clary), infusing Clary with Angel blood in the same way that Jonathan was with Demon blood. With Jace, upon the failure of Jonathan to show any compassion, he gave Angel blood to Jace's mother (Celiné Herondale), hoping to create a stronger warrior, without the side effects Jonathan suffered from the use Demon blood. In the end, Valentine trained Jace, but was forced to abandon him when he was 10 years old, making Valentine the only father Jace has known. It is also thought that of the two boys, the angel and the demon, that Valentine loved Jace more than his own son.

==== Appearances in books ====
- City of Bones
- City of Ashes
- City of Glass
- City of Lost Souls
- City of Fallen Angels (mentioned)
- City of Heavenly Fire (mentioned)
- A History of Notable Shadowhunters & Denizens of the Downworld

=== Jonathan Morgenstern ===
Sebastian Verlac/Jonathan Christopher Morgenstern/Sebastian Morgenstern is the son of Valentine Morgenstern and Jocelyn Fairchild, and brother of Clary Fray. His real name is Jonathan Christopher Morgenstern, but he went by Sebastian Verlac (cousin of the Penhallows) in City of Glass. He is very sadistic in nature, as a result of having been experimented on with the blood of the Greater Demon Lilith, which robbed him of his humanity. He first appears in City of Glass as Sebastian Verlac, charming his way into the lives of the Lightwoods. He takes Clary to see Ragnor Fell, and kisses her, disgusting her. Upon Clary's return with Jace to Alicante, it is discovered that Max Lightwood had seen someone climbing the demon warding towers. Sebastian was the person climbing the towers, and it was his blood that was used to bring down the wards. During the first attack on Alicante, he also kills Max Lightwood and severely injures Isabelle Lightwood. He is eventually tracked down and killed by Jace, before the summoning of Raziel by Valentine, but his body is never recovered. He is taken by his "mother", Lilith, and taken to safety. She uses Jace as leverage and tries to bring him back from the dead. In City of Fallen Angels he is awoken, and uses a rune put on Jace to control him.

He becomes the main antagonist in City of Lost Souls, using Lilith's bond to alter Jace's memories to believe they are on the same side and plans on raising and army of demons and Dark Shadowhunters to destroy the world. Clary infiltrates his inner circle through Jace and they both continually mistrust each other but are forced to work together when they are attacked by enemy demons. Eventually Clary learns the truth of his plans and they engage in a bloody battle. Unable to kill him because it will kill Jace too, she gives up but successfully destroys their base of operations with one of her runes. After a dark ritual, he uses the Infernal Cup to create more Dark Shadowhunters and almost turns Clary but is quickly stopped by the arrival of the Lightwoods and their allies. Before he manages to escape, Clary is forced to stab Jace with the angelic sword Glorious, severing his bond with Sebastian and causing the latter horrible pain. At the end of the book he sends a message to Maryse Lightwood: severed angel wings with a single piece of paper saying I am coming.

In City of Heavenly Fire, Sebastian is attacking institutes around the world and turning Shadowhunters into Endarkened. He then goes and attacks the Citadel, and kills many Shadowhunters but is forced to flee when Jace loses control of his Heavenly Fire. Sebastian then later visits Clary and tries to convince her to leave with him, offering her mercy but she refuses. Once again Jace and Sebastian fight but Sebastian proves that he cannot be hurt by anything other than the Heavenly Fire after he stabs himself and then leaves unharmed. Sebastian offers to leave all of the Shadowhunters in Alicante alone, and return Jocelyn, Luke, Magnus, Raphael and Meliorn, whom he has kidnapped, if the Clave turn over Clary and Jace to him. Clary, Jace, Simon, Alec and Isabelle all travel by portal to the Seelie court and travel through to Edom, where Sebastian is hiding. Sebastian is well aware of this and plans for them. When they arrive Sebastian defeats them all and forces Clary by his side. When he is unaware, Clary stabs him with a sword that contains the Heavenly Fire, burning away all of the demon blood in him. He dies surrounded by Clary, Jocelyn and Jace. Clary mourns for the brother that she could have had. Clary later spreads Sebastian's ashes over Lake Lyn.

Physical appearance

He is said to be the spitting image of Valentine. He has naturally white/silver hair, is very buff, and has deep black eyes. He dyes his hair black in City of Glass while he is impersonating Sebastian Verlac.

He is portrayed by Will Tudor as Sebastian and Luke Baines in his true form in the television series.

Family

Jonathan is the birth child of Jocelyn Morgenstern (née Fairchild) and Valentine Morgenstern. He was experimented on by Valentine while Jocelyn was pregnant with him. When he was born, Jocelyn knew that something was wrong with the child and had to try very hard to be around him. He is Clary's brother, and has an unusual sexual attraction to her, freely kissing her in City of Glass and almost forcing himself on her in City of Lost Souls with Clary having to fight him off, repulsed by his actions. The Demoness Lilith also claims that Jonathan is her "son" due to the fact that it is her demon blood that flows through his veins.

==== Appearances in books ====
- City of Bones (mentioned)
- City of Ashes (mentioned)
- City of Glass
- City of Fallen Angels
- City of Lost Souls
- City of Heavenly Fire
- Tales from the Shadowhunter Academy (mentioned)
- A History of Notable Shadowhunters & Denizens of the Downworld
- Lady Midnight (mentioned)
- Queen of Air and Darkness

== Secondary characters ==
=== Alaric ===
Alaric was a werewolf and served as Third hand (soon second when Gretel died) to Luke in his werewolf pack. He later dies in the battle at Renwick's in City of Bones.

=== Amatis Graymark ===
Amatis Graymark is Luke's sister who resides in Alicante. She cared for Luke after their mother became an Iron Sister, married Stephen Herondale, and later joined Valentine's Circle. However, when Luke was bitten by a werewolf, Amatis sent him away in disgust, in spite of their close relationship. Even after this, Valentine decided that Amatis was unfit to be Stephen's wife for having a Downworlder brother, and told Stephen to leave Amatis for Céline Montclaire (Jace's biological mother), devastating Amatis. Amatis later became regretful of her decision to banish her brother, who became distrustful of her. In City of Glass, Luke took refuge in Amatis' residence due to Clary's wounds caused by Lake Lyn, despite Amatis' resistance. Amatis then helps the Shadowhunters in the battle of Brocelind Plain and mends her relationship with Luke afterwards. In City of Lost Souls, Jonathan Morgenstern kidnaps Amatis and turns her into an Endarkened Shadowhunter by having her drink from the Infernal Cup, becoming Jonathan's faithful lieutenant from then on. With the Infernal Cup's destruction at the end of the series, Amatis too dies along with all other Endarkened Shadowhunters, only managing to give Luke one last loving look.

=== Catarina Loss ===
Catarina Loss is a warlock and an old friend of Magnus Bane, Ragnor Fell, and Tessa Gray. She has blue skin which she covers up using glamour rather frequently due to her choice to work at Beth Israel Hospital, a hospital for the mundanes. She helps Magnus craft an antidote to wake Jocelyn from her coma and is entrusted with the Book of the White. Catarina continues to help the Shadowhunters against Jonathan and his army of Endarkened Shadowhunters and at the end of the series, attends Jocelyn and Luke's wedding, where she hints that the Fair Folk is possibly planning revenge against the Shadowhunters for the disadvantaging terms applied to them for their betrayal during the war. She also begins teaching history at the Shadowhunter Academy in Alicante.

In the television series, she is portrayed by Sophia Walker.

=== Emma Carstairs ===
Emma Carstairs is a young Shadowhunter of the Los Angeles Institute who appears in City of Heavenly Fire. She is also the main protagonist of The Dark Artifices series (which takes place five years after The Mortal Instruments). Her parents are both killed by Malcolm Fade — although it was unknown at the time — during the height of the war against Jonathan and his army of Endarkened Shadowhunters; though they are not the true suspects, the Clave decides to put the blame on them. Emma is also interrogated by the Clave using the Mortal Sword which impacts her greatly and prompts Clary to comfort her. Though the Clave mumbles on sending Emma to her relatives, Emma decides to live with her parabatai, Julian Blackthorn, and his family back in Los Angeles. She has a crush on Jace Herondale, which later turns into a fierce desire to be like him, the best Shadowhunter of her generation.

=== Hodge Starkweather ===
Hodge Starkweather was a member of the Circle, a tutor to the Lightwood children. He was bound to the New York Institute due to not leaving the Circle before the Uprising but was still loyal to Valentine and tricked Clary into giving him The Mortal Cup so he could give to Valentine in order to be freed of his curse. He fled afterwards with Clary in pursuit and cornered him. Hodge was about to kill her but was attacked by Luke in his werewolf form and somehow found the strength to escape. He reappears again in City of Glass where he was imprisoned by the Clave in the cell next to the one Simon Lewis was in. After Simon was rescued by Clary, Jace and Alec, Hodge revealed where the Mortal Mirror was and nearly revealed to Jace that Valentine wasn't his real father but was killed by Jonathan Morgenstern before he could.

He is played by Jared Harris in the movie and Jon Cor in the television series.

=== Imogen Herondale ===
Imogen Herondale (née Whitelaw) is the Inquisitor up to City of Ashes and the paternal grandmother of Jace Herondale. Ever since Stephen's death at the hands of Valentine and her husband's immediate death after hearing the news, Imogen becomes a cold-hearted woman who seeks vengeance against Valentine and anyone who has connections with him, such as the former members of his Circle which includes the Lightwoods. She is also certain that Jace, whom she believes is Valentine's son, is a spy of his father. In City of Ashes, though, Imogen realizes that Jace is actually her grandson after looking at his birthmark (a sign of the Herondales which every Herondale man inherited, starting from Will) and sacrifices herself to protect Jace from a poison attack. Before she dies, Imogen tells Jace how his real father, Stephen, would be proud of him if he were still alive. She is portrayed by Mimi Kuzyk in the television series.

=== Lilith ===
Lilith is a Greater Demon, the first woman made by God and is said to have been Adam's first wife. However, she was disobedient so she was cast into Hell. Also Sebastian/Jonathan's creator because it was her blood that Valentine used. In the book, City of Fallen Angels, it is said that Lilith considers Sebastian her son because it is her blood that flows through his veins. She is then killed on Earth and banished to Edom by attacking Simon when he still had the Mark of Cain. She is portrayed by Anna Hopkins and Tara Westwood in the television series.

=== Consul Malachi ===
Malachi was a Shadowhunter Consul for almost two decades before his death. He secretly worked with Valentine Morgenstern and planned to destroy all of the Clave. Consequently, he was an enemy. He is killed in City of Glass by Hugo after he tries to hurt Clary.

=== Maryse Lightwood ===
Maryse Lightwood (née Trueblood) is the ex-wife of Robert Lightwood, mother of Alec, Isabelle, and Max, and the adoptive mother of Jace Herondale, being the one who gave him his nickname that he preferred over his "real" name, Jonathan. She is also one of the heads of the New York Institute. Maryse had a brother who decided to leave the Shadowhunter world in favor of marrying a mundane, making her an outcast in her peers, though she still honored him by naming her youngest son, Max, after him. Like her husband, Maryse was a part of Valentine's Circle and was the more attracted of the two, up until the Uprising which sentenced her and Robert to lead the New York Institute as punishment for conspiring with Valentine. Her marriage with Robert is never the same ever since the Uprising, with Robert even thinking of leaving the family several times. Maryse becomes especially grief-stricken after Max's death at the hands of Sebastian in City of Glass. At the end of The Mortal Instruments series, Maryse and Robert announce that they are no longer together, though the two say that they will continue to care and love each other. She is portrayed by Nicola Correia Damude in the television series.

=== Maureen Brown ===
Maureen Brown is a 14-year-old girl who tells everyone she is Simon's girlfriend and is the friend of the cousin of Simon's friend Eric. In City of Fallen Angels, Simon drinks her blood, but Camille turns her into a vampire and she starts working for Lilith after killing multiple mundanes. In the epilogue of City of Lost Souls, Alec goes to kill Camille though discovers that Maureen has already killed her and is now head of the New York vampire clan.

Maureen, as leader of the clan, allowed the members to kill conspicuously while sending for some of them to capture Simon, who later escaped to Idris with Raphael. It appears she was mentally tormented by Lilith and Camille before turning into a vampire which resulted in her corrupted state. Eventually Lily Chen, one of the second-in-commands of the clan, conspired with Maia Roberts, the new leader of the New York werewolf pack, to kill Maureen to stop her reckless actions; while most of the members were happy with her, some saw the error of her ways as a problem to their kind. Maia agreed to join Maureen's cause against the Shadowhunters to make her drink her blood and seal the deal. Her blood, however, was spiked with holy water and Maureen turned to dust, but not before being able mutter her last word, "Mama". Lily then took leadership of the clan.

=== Max Lightwood ===
Maxwell "Max" Joseph Lightwood is the second son of Robert and Maryse and the younger brother of Alec and Isabelle. He is 9 years old and is described as hating the fact that he is still young, which prevents him from joining in the matters for adults. In City of Glass, Max is murdered by Sebastian, who strikes him with his hammer. His death greatly impacts his sister, who blames herself for not being there to save him. His older brother, Alec Lightwood, later names his adopted warlock son, Max Michael Lightwood-Bane, after him. He's portrayed by Jack Fulton in the television series.

=== Raphael Santiago ===
Raphael Santiago used to be the head of the New York vampire clan at the Hotel Dumort. He became a vampire sometime in the 1950s after being bitten by a vampire at the hotel when he tried to drive out the vampires who lived there. He is said to have been asexual. He also briefly dated Shadowhunter Isabelle Lightwood in the TV adaptation of the book series. He was murdered by Sebastian Morgenstern for not killing Magnus Bane in the last installment of The Mortal Instruments: City Of Heavenly Fire. In the television series, Raphael did not die but was instead involuntarily dosed with heavenly fire which returned him to being human and was studying to become a priest. He is portrayed by David Castro in the television series.

=== Robert Lightwood ===
Robert Lightwood is one of the heads of the New York Institute, later the Inquisitor, ex-husband of Maryse, father of Alec, Isabelle, and Max, as well as the adoptive father of Jace Herondale. He was a part of Valentine's Circle until the Uprising, after which he and his family were banished to New York. His parabatai was Michael Wayland, but they drifted apart because of Robert's contempt for the latter's love for him, later breaking up completely after Robert's banishment to the point that Robert did not know that Michael had been murdered with his identity being taken up by Valentine. Robert's marriage with Maryse has been strained since their banishment and Robert once even considered to leave the family for Annamarie Highsmith if not for Max's birth; this fact is played up by Isabelle after Max's death, who accuses her father of being happy with Max's death now that his "burden" is released. Robert also seems to be the one in his family least pleased when Alec comes out of the closet, even questioning him about what drove him to become gay. At the end of The Mortal Instruments series, Robert has ended his marriage with Maryse, though the two say that they will continue to love each other. He also tells Alec that his disapproval of the latter's sexuality was because of his own guilt and shame from his unfair treatment of Michael Wayland. In the television series, he's portrayed by Paulino Nunes.

=== Tessa Gray/Herondale/Carstairs ===
Theresa "Tessa" Gray is a half-demon half-Shadowhunter warlock who is descended from the Starkweather family and the ancestor of the Herondale family. She is the main protagonist of The Infernal Devices series, a distant prequel series of The Mortal Instruments series set during the Victorian era London. Though she does not appear until the last book, Tessa figures prominently in the series' backstory, not only by her descendants (one of whom is Jace Herondale) but also as the one who performed the Shadowhunter ritual on Clary when she was younger; Clary even notes several times before their formal meeting that Tessa is familiar to her in some way. She was married to Will Herondale until his mortal death 60 years post-marriage, after which Tessa became a recluse living in the Spiral Labyrinth. When Brother Zachariah is cured by Jace's heavenly fire, he reverts to Tessa's old lover, Jem Carstairs, now a mortal and dispelled of any needs of his yin fen medication to which he had needed to live. The two happily marry sometime after Jocelyn and Luke's wedding, attended by the ghosts of Will Herondale and Jessamine Lovelace.

=== Brother Zachariah/Jem Carstairs ===
Zachariah is a Silent Brother who becomes the one most contacted by the Clave to solve cases regarding the New York Institute in 2007 after the Silent Brothers' massacre by Valentine. He used to be Jem Carstairs, a main character of The Infernal Devices series, who was turned into a Silent Brother to save his life as he laid dying due to running out of the yin fen medication required to sustain his life, in the process breaking his parabatai link with Will Herondale and separating him from his fiancée, Tessa Gray. He and Tessa together performed the Shadowhunter protection ritual on Clary when she was younger, thus erasing her knowledge about the Shadow World for a time. When he finds out that Jace is a descendant of Will, Zachariah becomes fiercely protective of him, especially when he is put under Jonathan Morgenstern's spell and infused with the heavenly fire. In City of Heavenly Fire, Zachariah's attempt to save Jace infuses him with the heavenly fire, which burns out his yin fen and turns him back into a mortal Jem Carstairs again. During the war he finds Emma Carstairs, a descendant of his family and protects her during the war. After the war, Jem reunites with Tessa and marries her a year after Jocelyn and Luke's wedding. He also begins to keep an eye on his distant relative, Emma Carstairs, and Tessa's descendants, the Blackthorns, in Los Angeles, and Jace Herondale.
