= Tales from the Shadowhunter Academy =

Book series by Cassandra Clare

- First print edition
- Authors: Cassandra Clare, Sarah Rees Brennan, Maureen Johnson, Robin Wasserman
- Cover artist: Cliff Nielsen
- Language: English
- Publisher: Margaret K. McElderry Books
- Publication date: February 17 – November 17, 2015 (print edition November 15, 2016)
- Publication place: United States
- Media type: Print, ebook, audiobook
- Pages: 655

Tales from the Shadowhunter Academy or simply called Shadowhunter Academy is a series of connected novellas featuring the character of Simon Lewis from Cassandra Clare's best-selling The Mortal Instruments series. It consists of ten novellas written by Cassandra Clare in collaboration with other authors that were published online on a monthly basis. Tales from the Shadowhunter Academy was released in print on November 15, 2016.

== Novellas ==
- Welcome to Shadowhunter Academy (with Sarah Rees Brennan)
  - Release date: February 17, 2015
  - Narrator: Devon Bostick
- The Lost Herondale (with Robin Wasserman)
  - Release date: March 17, 2015
  - Narrator: Jack Falahee
- The Whitechapel Fiend (with Maureen Johnson)
  - Release date: April 21, 2015
  - Narrator: Luke Pasqualino
- Nothing but Shadows (with Sarah Rees Brennan)
  - Release date: May 19, 2015
  - Narrator: Nico Mirallegro
- The Evil We Love (with Robin Wasserman)
  - Release date: June 16, 2015
  - Narrator: Chris Wood
- Pale Kings and Princes (with Robin Wasserman)
  - Release date: July 21, 2015
  - Narrator: Ki Hong Lee
- Bitter of Tongue (with Sarah Rees Brennan)
  - Release date: August 18, 2015
  - Narrator: Torrance Coombs
- The Fiery Trial (with Maureen Johnson)
  - Release date: September 15, 2015
  - Narrator: Sam Heughan
- Born to Endless Night (with Sarah Rees Brennan)
  - Release date: October 20, 2015
  - Narrator: Keahu Kahuanui
- Angels Twice Descending (with Robin Wasserman)
  - Release date: November 17, 2015
  - Narrator: Brett Dalton

== Plot ==
Simon Lewis, who was a mundane in City of Bones, then a vampire from the middle of City of Ashes until almost the end of City of Heavenly Fire has been stripped of his memories by a greater demon in the final volume of The Mortal Instruments. In order to retrieve his memories, he decides to become a Shadowhunter, but he must first train at the Shadowhunter Academy.

The collection contains characters from The Mortal Instruments and The Infernal Devices and reveals the history of some famous Shadowhunters like Michael Wayland, Stephen Herondale and Robert Lightwood. Simon learns about the history of Shadowhunters through guest lecturers like Jace Herondale, Tessa Gray and Catarina Loss.
