= Lady Midnight =

2016 novel by Cassandra Clare

- Author: Cassandra Clare
- Cover artist: Cliff Nielsen
- Language: English
- Series: The Dark Artifices
- Genre: Fantasy
- Publisher: Margaret K. McElderry Books
- Publication date: March 8, 2016
- Publication place: United States
- Media type: Hardcover, Paperback, Ebook
- Pages: 668
- ISBN: 1442468351
- Followed by: Lord of Shadows

Lady Midnight is a young adult urban fantasy novel by Cassandra Clare. It is the first book in The Dark Artifices, which is chronologically fourth in The Shadowhunter Chronicles. The book follows the events that occur in the Los Angeles area in 2012, focusing on the residents of the Los Angeles Institute. The title was based upon Annabel Lee by Edgar Allan Poe and all of the chapter titles are lines from the poem.

== Plot ==
Emma Carstairs has been living with the Blackthorn family: her parabatai, Julian; his siblings Livvy, Ty, Dru, and Tavvy; and their uncle, Arthur, in the Los Angeles Institute since her parents' deaths during the Dark War five years ago. Having grown into a prodigious Shadowhunter, she is still investigating the true cause of her parents' demise, despite the Clave telling her that they were killed by the late Sebastian Morgenstern. According to Johnny Rook, a mundane shopkeeper from the Shadow Market, similar murders befell eleven faeries, whose kind are ostracized by the Clave under the Cold Peace for their support of the Endarkened. Later, Emma also investigates a mundane murdered apparently by the same culprit who killed the faeries. Ty's research points to the victims being killed inside sacred locations known as the ley lines as part of a dark ritual.

Meanwhile, Julian struggles between running the institute, since Arthur is functionally insane from his previous experiences in Faerie, and his love for Emma, despite parabatai being forbidden from pursuing a romantic relationship. He gets the medication for Arthur's illness from Malcolm Fade, the High Warlock of Los Angeles. Diana Wrayburn occasionally helps the younger Shadowhunters with the upkeep of the institute, but refuses to replace Arthur as leader and frequently leaves for other missions.

One day, the Wild Hunt, a group of traveling faeries led by Gwyn ap Nudd, arrive to deliver Mark, the eldest Blackthorn brother, who was kidnapped by them during the Dark War. They demand that the Shadowhunters solve the faeries' murders—secretly, because of the Cold Peace—or else they will take Mark back. Changed by his time in Faerie, Mark finds solace only in Cristina Rosales, a Shadowhunter from the Mexico City Institute currently staying in Los Angeles. With Mark's help, Emma finds a cave which serves as a convergence point for the ley lines, managing to take evidences before being attacked by demons. Ty's research about the mundane victim points them to the victim's girlfriend, who has committed suicide in her house. Taking an invitation to the "Lottery", Emma and Julian are attacked by a person whole in black and the latter is gravely injured. Despite this, Emma manages to heal him quickly.

Ty and Livvy translate the evidences from the cave and are puzzled to find that they are passages from "Annabel Lee", the last poem by Edgar Allan Poe. Meanwhile, Emma, Julian, Mark, and Cristina attend the Lottery and see that it is held by a cult whose members kill to achieve luck. Emma and Julian question Rook further, learning the place where Casper Sterling, the latest winner of the Lottery, currently lives and that the Lottery's participants are followers of the mysterious Guardian, before being shooed away when they and Ty meet his son, Kit. Emma goes back to the cave and finds a portal which transports her to the sea. Julian, through his parabatai bond, rescues her. They subsequently admit their love for each other.

Eventually, Ty completely translates the runes carved onto the victims' bodies and learns that the ritual, which requires thirteen sacrifices, also demands Blackthorn blood. Emma and Cristina race to capture Sterling, but are too late to stop him from murdering the thirteenth victim, a witch. Sterling himself is murdered by the Followers, his hand cut and taken. The two unexpectedly meet with Diego Rosales, Cristina's ex-boyfriend and the reason why she left Mexico City. Diego is a Centurion—graduates of the Scholomance—and claims that he was sent to investigate the Guardian's ritual, whose goal is to resurrect someone, and also they experienced that he was the person whole in black. Back home, the Blackthorns connect the ritual to an old Shadowhunter folktale, "Lady Midnight". In the story, a woman was killed by her parents and her lover made a deal with the Faerie king to conduct a ritual which required Blackthorn blood and the Black Volume of the Dead.

Meanwhile, Mark is visited several times by his boyfriend from the Wild Hunt, the Unseelie prince Kieran. Kieran becomes jealous of Mark's growing relationship with Cristina. When Kieran overhears Mark telling her Gwyn's weakness, he reports this to Gwyn, who comes alongside Iarlath, the right-hand man of the Unseelie King, to punish Mark by flagellation. Julian initially volunteers, but Emma, unable to see him being tortured, volunteers herself and is badly injured. This causes Mark to reject going back to the Wild Hunt and accept being a Shadowhunter.

Eventually, the Blackthorns research their family history and find out that "Lady Midnight" is based on the story of Annabel Blackthorn, a Shadowhunter who fell in love with a warlock. Emma calls Rook, the latter admitting that he worked with the Guardian to trick the Lottery winners. By piecing together the clues, she realizes that Malcolm is the Guardian. However, before they can act, Malcolm has tricked Dru to give Tavvy to him. Kieran visits the Institute and, in goodwill, reveals two pieces of information: Iarlath is working with Malcolm, and Emma's parents were killed to test the resurrection spell. The group and Kieran go to the cave. Confronting Malcolm, he threatens to reveal Diana's secret before knocking her out. The younger Shadowhunters fight Malcolm and Emma manages to steal the Hand of Glory, which contains the hands of the Lottery winners. Upon being cornered, Emma opens the cave portal, sending Malcolm to be eaten by sea demons.

The Shadowhunters head back home and are greeted by Clary Fairchild, Jace Herondale, and Inquisitor Lightwood, fresh from attending Simon Lovelace's and Isabelle Lightwood's engagement party. The three agree to let Mark stay at Los Angeles. Meanwhile, with Malcolm's death, Rook loses the protection on his house and is immediately killed by demons. Kit is rescued by Tessa Gray and Jem Carstairs and told that he is a descendant of the Lost Herondale. The two then take him to the Los Angeles Institute. Approaching Jem, Emma is told that parabatai who are in love with each other have strengthened runes, but they will also bring misery to everyone around them. With this in mind, she breaks up with Julian and pretends to date Mark.

In the epilogue, Annabel Blackthorn opens her eyes.

== Characters ==
- Emma Carstairs - a 17 year old Shadowhunter that has lived most of her life in the Los Angeles Institute with the Blackthorn family. She has brown eyes, long, pale blond hair, and pale skin. As an effect of working extraordinarily hard at her training, her body is strong, tough, and scarred. She has a deep scar up her right arm, which she got when she was young for hugging her sword Cortana.
- Julian Blackthorn - another 17 year old Shadowhunter who has lived his entire life at the Los Angeles Institute. He lives there alongside his siblings and Emma Carstairs, his best friend and parabatai. Julian has dark brown messy hair and the startling Blackthorn blue-green eyes, the color of the sea. He is described as tall and slender, lanky, with high cheekbones. As an artist, he is usually seen untidy or splattered with paint, and his nails are bitten. His hair is the color of dark chocolate and wildly wavy and he is said to be the kind of person to wear all black and pull his sleeves over his hands. After his father's death and the kidnapping and the exile of his eldest siblings, Jules ends up caring for all of his younger siblings.
- Mark Blackthorn - a Shadowhunter residing at the Los Angeles Institute and is one of the many Blackthorn children. He was a former Hunter who rode with the Wild Hunt. He and his older sister, Helen, have the same faerie mother known as Nerissa and are part-faerie. He is 21 years old as of 2012 and is described as being tall, thin, has broad shoulders, and bore the signature blue-green eyes of the Blackthorns. However, since Mark became part of the Wild Hunt; his right eye has since turned gold. Like Helen, he also has pointed ears and pale white-gold hair that curls in ringlets. As they both share their mother's faerie blood, both have a rather delicate bone structure.
- Tiberius "Ty" Blackthorn - a Shadowhunter from the Los Angeles Institute and is very likely on the autistic spectrum. He is 15 years old as of 2012. Tiberius, unlike most of his siblings, has black hair and gray eyes, as opposed to the family's trademark brown hair and blue-green eyes. He and his twin sister Livvy were born with gray eyes, though hers had changed to blue-green since, though they both still have long lashes and Cupid's bow lips. Julian puts down Ty's ability to be different to sheer stubbornness. Ty is apparently also quite skinny. He is often considered by his family members as "fragile".
- Livia "Livvy" Blackthorn - the twin sister of Tiberius Blackthorn, as well as the sister of Jules, Dru, and Tavvy, and the half-sister of Helen and Mark. She lives at the Los Angeles Institute with her siblings, under the guardianship of their uncle, Arthur. She is 15 years old as of 2012. Livia, like her other siblings, has the Blackthorn brown hair and blue-green eyes. Livvy was born with gray eyes like her twin, Tiberius, though hers had changed to blue-green since. Both also have long lashes and Cupid's bow lips.
- Drusilla "Dru" Blackthorn - a 13-year-old Shadowhunter from the Blackthorn family who lives at the Los Angeles Institute. She has the Blackthorns' signature dark brown hair and blue-green eyes. She is quite tall for her age. As a child, she was already compact, expected to grow to be curvy unlike her mostly lanky siblings. Her body has since already gone through puberty early, showing off her curves to the point where Dru, at thirteen, has been mistaken for seventeen or eighteen years old by mundane boys. This has made her very self-conscious about her body because unlike most Shadowhunters who are wiry or muscular, she is round-bodied and doesn't fit into the gear designed for girls in her age group. She often wears her hair in two braids. Drusilla is quite shy and often feels self-conscious about her body.
- Octavian "Tavvy" Blackthorn - a Shadowhunter of the Blackthorn family and is the youngest in their family. He resides in the Los Angeles Institute. He is 7 years old as of 2012. Tavvy shares the Blackthorn family's dark brown hair and blue-green eyes. According to Jules, he is quite small and thin for his age.
- Cristina Mendoza-Rosales - a Shadowhunter from Mexico who came to the Los Angeles Institute and became fast friends with the Institute ward Emma Carstairs. She is 18 years old as of 2012. She has dark brown eyes and long, black hair. Cristina is a generally wise, composed, and gentle person. She is principled and thoughtful, strong and unwavering in her loyalty and morals.
- Diego Rocío Rosales - one of the youngest Centurions to ever graduate from the Scholomance. He is 19 years old as of 2012. Diego has thick, dark hair. He is often referred to by the other characters as "Perfect Diego". He was sent to Los Angeles to investigate the recent mystery.
- Diana Wrayburn - a Shadowhunter who used to run a weapons shop called Diana's Arrow in Alicante. After the Dark War, Diana volunteered to be stationed at Los Angeles to become the tutor of the Blackthorn children. Diana has black hair and dark skin. On her cheek is a tattoo of a silver koi fish.
- Arthur Blackthorn - the current head of the Los Angeles Institute and the uncle of the Blackthorn children Mark, Helen, Julian, Livia, Tiberius, Drusilla, and Octavian. Arthur resembles his brother, Andrew Blackthorn, albeit smaller and paler. He has a slight figure, a round face, brown hair, and the trademark Blackthorn blue-green eyes. He also wears spectacles. He is often plagued by a curious madness and does not like to be disturbed.
- Malcolm Fade - a very powerful warlock and the High Warlock of Los Angeles. Malcolm is a tall man with an angular face, white hair, and purple eyes. He is strangely attractive. He has the appearance of a twenty-seven-year-old man.
- Kieran - a faerie and a member of the Wild Hunt. He is one of the Unseelie King's many children and is thus considered a prince of the Unseelie Court. Kieran is said to be beautiful — inhumanly so — and fierce. He has high cheekbones and wide spaced eyes, the left black and the right a deep silver. He is pale and his body is lithe and graceful. As a prince of Faerie, Kieran wears battered white gauntlets. His thick hair changes color —specifically colors of the sea, due in part to his nixie heritage— depending on his mood, from dark black when he was in a bad mood to a pale blue when he happy, though he could also change them at will.
- Johnny Rook - a mysterious figure who ran a booth at the Los Angeles Shadow Market. He is described as having blond graying hair and blue eyes. Johnny rarely showed affection, but when he did, it was only for his son, Kit.
- Christopher "Kit" Rook - a Shadowhunter who was raised as a mundane, previously unaware of his heritage. He was born Christopher Jonathan Herondale and is the son of the man who called himself Johnny Rook. He and his late mother, Rosemary are descendants of the notorious Tobias Herondale and his lost line as well a long line of royal-blooded faeries. He is described as having waves of gold hair and sky blue eyes.
- Magnus Bane - The High Warlock of Brooklyn. Being over four centuries old, his life has since intertwined with several Shadowhunters and Downworlders over the centuries. Magnus stopped ageing at around 19 and thus looks quite young. Magnus has brown skin, is very tall, with a long and lean body. His warlock marks are his yellow-green "cat-like eyes" with vertical pupils and his lack of a belly button. He is also noted to have a somewhat Asian appearance, due to the curve of his eyes. He has dark black hair; his hairstyles has changed over the years, ranging from short and spiked to straight and shoulder length. He wears all kinds of make-up, such as glitter around his eyes, lipstick, and nail polish. He likes to flaunt his beauty by often dressing in flamboyant and glitzy ensembles, which is seen by some as strange, or unique.
- Theresa "Tessa" Gray - an American warlock, particularly a new kind of warlock—the rare half-Shadowhunter, half-Eidolon demon. She moved to London in 1878 and her life has since been entangled in the lives of the Nephilim. Tessa has smooth, thick, wavy brown hair, steely gray-blue eyes, an oval face, and a slender body. She is around 5'9. While she used to think herself average, several of her friends have noted that Tessa is pretty and beautiful; not conventionally beautiful, but kindly attractive. Being immortal, Tessa stopped aging young and appears like a young woman in her early twenties.
- James "Jem" Carstairs - an inactive Shadowhunter and a former Silent Brother. Once an orphan living in the London Institute in the 1870s, along with his parabatai, Will Herondale, he is now a mortal who is over a hundred years old, cured of his illness. Jem's hair is dark brown, almost black, with only a single silver streak remaining, and his eyes are dark brown with gold flecks. Due to his stagnancy as a Silent Brother, Jem maintained his youthful appearance, looking like someone in his early twenties, though his wisdom and experiences in his long life as a Silent Brother reflects in his eyes.

== Reception ==
The book has received mixed response since its publishing. Some reviews like the on thenational.ae suggests good things about the book, it says, "Clare's imagination once again fills the pages with a thrilling world that promises political deviance, never-ending drama and unwavering love". The Palatinate.org.uk reviewed the book as, "Lady Midnight might not be Cassandra Clare's best work, but fans of The Mortal Instruments and The Infernal Devices will still likely find it an interesting read." Common Sense Media said that fans of the Shadowhunter Chronicles will love this book but anyone who is expecting something new will likely be disappointed.

However, The Guardian also agreed that the book was overhyped and not the best work, calling it predictable. Another review appreciate the books, quoting, "The world in which Cassandra Clare has created in her Shadowhunter series is slightly chilling" Kirkus also praised the book saying that fans of her books will enjoy the new characters, who are full of 'secret ardor and murderous zeal.'
