= City of Lost Souls =

City of Lost Souls may refer to:

- The City of Lost Souls, a 2000 Japanese action film
- City of Lost Souls (1983 film), a German musical film
- City of Lost Souls (novel), a 2012 novel by Cassandra Clare
