= Queen of Air and Darkness (Clare novel) =

2018 novel by Cassandra Clare

Queen of Air and Darkness (The Dark Artifices #3)
- First edition
- Author: Cassandra Clare
- Cover artist: Cliff Nielsen
- Language: English
- Series: The Dark Artifices
- Genre: Fantasy
- Publisher: Margaret K. McElderry Books
- Publication date: December 4, 2018
- Publication place: United States
- Media type: Hardcover, Paperback, Ebook
- Pages: 912
- ISBN: 9781471116704
- Preceded by: Lord of Shadows

Queen of Air and Darkness is the third and final book in The Dark Artifices trilogy by Cassandra Clare, which is the fourth chronological series in The Shadowhunter Chronicles. This series follows the characters of the LA Institute in 2012 and features characters from all of the previous series. The chapter titles all come from the poem The City in the Sea by Edgar Allan Poe.

== Plot ==
After the events of the book Lord of Shadows, the Shadowhunters prepare for the burning of the pyres of Robert Lightwood and Livvy Blackthorn. The Cohort, a fascist organization that aim to discredit and destroy Downworlders, begins taking over the Clave. They nominate Horace Dearborn to replace Robert as the new Inquisitor. Julian Blackthorn confesses to Magnus Bane that his parabatai bond with Emma Carstairs has been changed by their love, asking him to put a spell that dampens his feelings for her. During the funeral, Emma meets with her distant cousin, Jem, telling her about Kit Herondale's fey heritage as well as a warlock sickness supposedly caused by ley lines. Before leaving, he gives her a ring which will alert his wife, Tessa Gray, to her location.

Horace states his plans to interrogate all Downworlders and bars Emma and Julian from leaving with the other Blackthorns back to Los Angeles. He gives them a mission to go to Faerie, kill Annabel Blackthorn, and retrieve the Black Volume of the Dead. When the two arrive at Faerie, they realize that Horace never intended them to survive and has sent Dane Larkspear to kill them. Julian kills him before Seelie faeries, including Nene, appear to take them to the Seelie Court. There, Julian gives the Seelie Queen a copy of the Black Volume in return for the information on how to break the parabatai bond: by cutting the original bond in Silent City with the Mortal Sword, which will break all bonds in the world.

At the Scholomance, Diego Rosales attempts to hide Kieran from the Cohort. He saves Kieran when he is about to be thrown into the Pool of Reflection, in the process knocking Dane's sister, Samantha, towards the pool, where she is tortured to insanity. The two are imprisoned and learn about Emma's and Julian's mission. Diego convinces Kieran to escape using his fey steed while he remains behind. Kieran heads to Los Angeles and saves Cristina Rosales and Mark Blackthorn as they are attacked by faeries while investigating a ley line. Learning about the mission, Cristina, Mark, and Kieran call in Jaime Rosales to give them the Eternidad so they can go to Faerie. The trio are forced to join the revels of Kieran's brother Oban, who is working with a Cohort member, Manuel Villalobos. Cristina manages to escape with the Eternidad and requests for Adaon's help.

Horace calls the Clave several times to vote on a Downworlder registry. After being informed of what befell the Larkspear siblings, the Clave vote to create the registry. Diana Wrayburn demands Gwyn ap Nudd to take her back to Los Angeles. Briefly captured, she is able to break free from Horace before leaving with Gwyn. However, in the process, the Consul, Jia Penhallow is imprisoned.

Nene offers Emma and Julian the chance to replace her and another sympathetic faerie's positions to accompany the Seelie Queen during her parley with the Unseelie King to regain her son, Ash. Infiltrating the Unseelie Tower, they confront Annabel and the King, Arawn, revealed to be subjecting Ash to spells from the Black Volume, causing him to attract people to care for him. He plans to use Ash to conquer the Seelie Court and wipe out all Shadowhunters. After a brief encounter with Ash, Emma and Julian are thrown to the dungeons and reunite with Clary Fairchild and Jace Herondale.

The four are freed by Cristina and Adaon, who fakes them as his prisoners to Arawn's court so they can rescue Mark and Kieran. Arawn has opened a portal to a place called Thule, which he uses to power up Ash. A heated confrontation ensues with a vengeful Julian attacking Annabel and Arawn attempting to have Ash execute Kieran before the Seelie Queen appears to claim her son, revealing that she and Arawn used to have a daughter, the First Heir, whom he killed. In the confusion, Annabel takes Ash through the portal to Thule, while Kieran manages to kill Arawn when he is about to make a move on Adaon. While the Seelie Queen leaves with Adaon, Emma and Julian attempt to leave with the others as the Riders of Mannan hunt them, but fail and decide to enter Thule.

Upon arrival, Emma and Julian learn that Thule is an alternate universe set two years into the future. In this reality, Clary was killed during the Battle of the Burren, allowing Sebastian Morgenstern, with Jace's and the Endarkened's help, to conquer the world, causing lands to decay in a phenomenon known as Blight, which serves as portals for demons to cross over. Shadowhunters have lost their angelic power and split between the many siding with Sebastian and calling themselves the Legion of the Star, and those striving for freedom with the Downworlders, known as the Resistance. To their shock, the Resistance is led by Livvy, who is still alive in Thule. Though at first skeptical, Livvy eventually warms up to Emma and Julian and reveals that their versions in Thule have been Endarkened.

Emma breaks her ring to call for Tessa's help and to her surprise gets a response. She and Julian meet with alternate Tessa, the world's last warlock as all others have died of warlock sickness caused by the Blight. While the Shadowhunters of Thule have failed to kill Sebastian with the Mortal Sword—which still exists in Thule—she believes that the two, who are not of this world, may be able to bring him down. She also informs them that Blight can be neutralized with waters from Lake Lyn. Emma and Julian briefly confront Annabel, who promises them a portal for them to go home, but they will have to take Ash with them. Emma, Julian, and the Resistance head to Silent City, where the Mortal Sword is located, and manage to retrieve it before the Legion ambush them. Tessa sacrifices herself to give Emma time to kill Sebastian with the Sword, aided by Ash, who flies away with Jace using his wings. After she opens the portal, Julian avenges Livvy by killing Annabel, before taking off with Emma back to their reality.

Back home, Emma tells the others the solution the alternate Tessa told her about the Blight. The group work with the Wild Hunt to get the waters. Horace announces the deaths of Clary and Jace to manipulate his supporters as he is about to parley with Oban. Julian has Magnus remove the dampening spell, before calling on a meeting of anti-Registry Shadowhunters and Downworlders to expose the Cohort's lies, under the name "Livia's Watch". Manuel, knowing the truth about Clary and Jace, attempts to assassinate them but is foiled by Julian and taken prisoner. Emma is convinced not to cut the original parabatai bond by Julian.

The parley between the Cohort and the Unseelie Court is interrupted by Livia's Watch, who expose Horace's lies by forcing Manuel to divulge the truth using the alternate Mortal Sword, before escalating into open warfare. During the confrontation, Dru frees Jia, Diego and Jaime from imprisonment. Meanwhile, Ty begins a ritual to resurrect Livvy, despite Kit's protests. Regardless, the ritual only manages to bring Livvy as an apparition that only the two can see. Kit discovers that he is a descendant of the First Heir when he manages to incapacitate the Riders of Mannan. It is also revealed that Shade, the warlock who helped Ty find the ingredients for the ritual, is actually Ragnor Fell, Magnus' friend long thought to be dead. In the war's final stages, Zara Dearborn gravely wounds Emma. As Julian cradles her, their parabatai bond is strengthened by their love, transforming them into gigantic monsters that kill Horace and swiftly dispose their enemies. However, they nearly destroy Alicante before the Blackthorns convince them to lay down their arms. When they wake up, they discover that they are no longer parabatai.

With Cristina's and Mark's help, Kieran kills Oban and is proclaimed the new Unseelie King, since Adaon relinquishes his birthright. With this status, he is forced to part ways from them just as they realize their love for each other. Kit decides to move in with Tessa and Jem to Devon. Dru overhears Magnus telling Ty about the side effects of Livvy's resurrection spell. During the Clave meeting, the Cohort refuse to surrender, so Alec Lightwood, having been proclaimed as the new Consul after Jia's abdication, leads the anti-Cohort Shadowhunters to leave Idris and never return. Subsequently, Alec and Magnus hold their wedding in front of the Los Angeles Institute.

In the epilogue, the Seelie Queen is visited by the Jace of Thule. Jace promises to hand Ash over in exchange for meeting Clary.

== Principle characters ==
- Emma Carstairs - A Shadowhunter who has lived her whole life at the LA Institute with the Blackthorn family since her parents died. She considers herself the protector of the Blackthorn family, and wields the blade Cortana, passed down in her family for generations. She is described as the greatest fighter of her generation, the next Jace Herondale. She has long golden hair, big brown eyes, and tan skin.
- Julian Blackthorn - Emma's parabatai, who takes care of all of the Blackthorn siblings and is madly in love with Emma. He struggles greatly with his emotions after Livvy's death, as well as trying to hold off the parabatai curse. He is considered to have a "ruthless heart," as someone who would burn the world down to keep his family together. He has chocolate colored hair, blue-green eyes, and is tall, the same height as Jace Herondale.
- Mark Blackthorn - Julian's older brother who is half fae and was kidnapped by the Wild Hunt at a young age. He is torn between his love for Cristina Mendoza-Rosales and Kieran Kingson. He has pale blond hair, with a waifish fae frame.
- Cristina Mendoza-Rosales - A Mexican Shadowhunter on her travel year to the LA institute who is particularly interested in ending the Cold Peace between Shadowhunters and Faeries. She is torn between her feelings for Mark Blackthorn and Kieran Kingson.
- Kieran Kingson - An Unseelie Prince of Faerie who was part of the Wild Hunt. He has dark blue hair, and two different colored eyes as all members of the hunt do. He is torn between his love for Cristina Mendoza-Rosales and Mark Blackthorn and the King of the Unseelie.
- Tiberius "Ty" Nero Blackthorn - One of the middle Blackthorns who was Livvy's twin brother. He is on the spectrum and refuses to accept the death of his twin, Livia, and resolves instead to raise her. He cares a great deal about Kit, but it is unclear if his feelings are romantic or platonic.
- Kit Herondale - A boy who has just recently learned that he is a Shadowhunter and part of the lost Herondale line, as well as discovering he is the last descendant of the First Heir. He is particularly close to Tiberius Blackthorn, and expresses his love for him.
- Dru Blackthorn - The second youngest Blackthorn, frustrated at being treated as too young to participate, despite her maturity. She struggles to accept Helen as her sister, and crushes on Jaime Rosales. She seeks a closer relationship with her brother, Ty.
- Helen Blackthorn - The eldest Blackthorn sibling who is also half fae, and struggles to find a place in the Blackthorn family after being exiled for five years.
- Aline Penhallow - The wife of Helen Blackthorn, and daughter of the Consul, Jia Penhallow. She is extremely protective of Helen and can get angry easily for her sake.
- Octavian "Tavvy" Blackthorn - The youngest Blackthorn sibling.
- Diego Rocío Rosales - Cristina's ex who is a Centurion in the Scholomance, as well as being in an arranged engagement with Zara Dearborn.
- Jaime Rosales - Diego's younger brother who ran away from home to keep the Eternidad from Dearborn hands. He cares deeply for Cristina, and holds a friendship with Drusilla Blackthorn.
- Diana Wrayburn - The Blackthorn's tutor at the institute who was revealed to be transgender in the previous book, and is in a relationship with Gwyn ap Nudd.
- Magnus Bane - The High Warlock of Brooklyn, loyal to Shadowhunters due to his relationship with Alec Lightwood. He is one of the few who knows of Emma and Julian's secret relationship, and works to help them, but is rendered weak and ill from the blight. He has two sons with Alec Lightwood, Rafeal Lightwood-Bane, and Max Lightwood-Bane.
- Horace Dearborn - The leader of the Cohort. A manipulator who relies on fear and scapegoats to gain the position of Inquisitor. He preaches anti-Downworlder policies, and despises the Blackthorns, sending Emma and Julian on a mission intending to have them killed before they return.
- Zara Dearborn - The daughter of Horace, a loud mouth supporter of anti-Downworlder policies. She is considered plain looking and extremely jealous of Emma, taking credit for incredible feats of others, and even stealing Cortana. She is in an arranged marriage with Diego Rocio-Rosales as an attempt to gain control of the Eternidad.
- Jace Herondale - One of the heroes of the Dark War and Mortal War, renowned as the greatest fighter of his generation, as well as being known for his good looks. Due to his extra angel blood, he is quicker than most Shadowhunters, and is able to use runes in blighted areas. As the only other living member of the Herondale family, he tries to establish a connection with Kit. He is in love with Clary Fairchild, and has proposed several times to her. He is also the parabatai of Alec Lightwood.
- Clary Fairchild - One of the heroes of the Dark War and Mortal War, daughter of Valentine Morgenstern, and sister of Sebastian Morgenstern. Due to having extra angel blood, she is able to create runes, portals, and use runes in blighted areas. She is parabatai to Simon Lovelace, and is in love with Jace Herondale, but rejects his proposals due to her visions of her death.
- Alec Lightwood - One of the heroes of the Dark War and Mortal War. He is a skilled archer, and an advocate of Downworlder and Shadowhunter relations. He mourns the death of his father Robert Lightwood, the previous Inquisitor also slayed by Annabel Blackthorn. He has two sons with Magnus Bane, Rafeal Lightwood-Bane, and Max Lightwood-Bane, and is the parabatai of Jace Herondale.
- Isabelle Lightwood - One of the heroes of the Dark War and Mortal War. She is known for being extremely beautiful, and is extremely vocal about her thoughts and beliefs. She is currently engaged to Simon Lovelace.
- Simon Lovelace - A mundane who ascended into Nephilim, taking the last name Lovelace after his friend who died. He is parabatai to Clary Fairchild, and is engaged to Isabelle Lightwood.
- Gwyn ap Nudd - The leader of the Wild Hunt, who is in love with Diana.
- Jia Penhallow - The current Consul of the Clave. She is against the Cohort, and works with Diana to find evidence to discredit Horace, while also finding solutions to The Blight. She is also Aline's mother, and Helen's mother-in-law.
- Ragnor Fell "Shade" - An old warlock, believed to be dead after the Dark War. He tries to convince Ty out of raising his sister, and ultimately stops helping him, believing it will keep him from proceeding. He is close friends with both Catarina Loss, and Magnus Bane.
- James "Jem" Carstairs - A distant relative of Emma, once a Silent Brother. He acts as an uncle to Emma, as the last remaining member of her family. He is married to Tessa Gray, and works with her to protect the Herondale line.
- Tessa Gray - A warlock with shadowhunter blood. She is the widow of Will Herondale, and the wife of Jem Carstairs. She looks for a cure to the warlock illness, while also working to protect the Herondale line.
- Annabel Callisto Blackthorn - A Blackthorn ancestor who was resurrected by Malcolm Fade in the first book of the trilogy.
- Ash - The son of Sebastian Morgenstern and the Seelie Queen, giving him an interesting mix of faerie blood, demon blood, and angel blood. Due to the Unseelie King tampering with the black volume, Ash's aura inspires perfect loyalty and makes one want to protect him. He has expressed interest in Drusilla Blackthorn.
- Adaon Kingson - Kieran's brother, one of the sons of the Unseelie King. The only brother who does not take pleasure in causing pain, and has shown care for Kieran. He is favored to inherit the Unseelie throne before he is kidnapped by the Seelie Queen where he becomes one of her consorts.
- Unseelie King - The ruler of the Unseelie Court in Faerie. Cruel and selfish, he ordered the first heir to be killed simply because she was a girl. Since then, he has had all his daughters murdered.
- Seelie Queen - The ruler of Seelie Court in Faerie, with long red hair and bright blue eyes. She is known for cruelness and manipulations.
- Oban - Kieran's brother who is next in line for the throne. He looks very much like Kieran, with proud features and dark hair. He is known as a foolish drunkard, and is easily manipulated.
- Catarina Loss - A warlock who is good friends with Magnus Bane. She uses her powers largely for healing, and works as a mundane nurse. She helped Diana transition, and also helps Cristina look into the warlock sickness.

== Reception ==
Queen of Air and Darkness released to mixed reviews from critics and fans alike. Common Sense Media said that it was more 'soap opera saga than fantasy tome' due to all of the character-related drama taking away from the main action of the book. TMI Source however called the book a 'stunning finale' to the series. Many other fans have complained that it doesn't have a resolved ending, due to the fact that Cassandra Clare plans on returning to these characters in her upcoming series, The Wicked Powers. Most reviews argue that if you're a fan of The Shadowhunter Chronicles, then you won't be disappointed by this series.
