= Lord of Shadows =

2017 novel by Cassandra Clare

Lord of Shadows (The Dark Artifices #2)
- Author: Cassandra Clare
- Audio read by: James Marsters
- Cover artist: Cliff Nielsen
- Language: English
- Series: The Dark Artifices
- Genre: Fantasy
- Publisher: Margaret K. McElderry Books
- Publication date: May 23, 2017
- Publication place: United States
- Media type: Print (hardcover and paperback), ebook, audiobook
- Pages: 699
- ISBN: 9781442468405
- OCLC: 951070885
- Preceded by: Lady Midnight
- Followed by: Queen of Air and Darkness

Lord of Shadows is a young adult urban fantasy novel by Cassandra Clare. It is the second book in The Dark Artifices, which is chronologically the fourth series in The Shadowhunter Chronicles. The book is set in the Los Angeles area in 2012. The titles from each chapter are derived from the poem Dreamland by Edgar Allan Poe.

== Plot ==
A month after the events of Lady Midnight, Clary Fairchild and Jace Herondale visit the Los Angeles Institute to ask Mark Blackthorn about the entrance to Faerie, as they believe that Clary's brother, Sebastian Morgenstern, had left a weapon at the hands of the Seelie Queen. Clary confesses to Emma Carstairs that she has been dreaming about her death. The Shadowhunters investigate Malcolm Fade's house and find out that he had been consorting with the Unseelie King. When they return, the Institute has been taken over by Centurions, graduates from the Scholomance, led by Zara Dearborn, who reveals that she is engaged to Diego Rosales. This upsets Cristina, since she has just reconciled with him. Meanwhile, Kit, having learned that he is a Shadowhunter named Christopher Herondale, tries to leave the Institute several times, but is dissuaded by Jace and Ty. He is, however, barred from visiting the local Shadow Market because of his status. Clary and Jace subsequently leave for Faerie.

Emma, Julian, and Mark are visited by Gwyn of the Wild Hunt, who pleads with Mark to save Kieran. Kieran had killed the Unseelie King's right-hand man, Iarlath, and is about to be executed. The trio and Cristina enter Faerie, where they navigate through its deceptive environment as they are confronted by their desires: Emma's and Julian's forbidden love and Cristina's and Mark's newfound love for each other, which binds the latter with a curse. When they reach the Unseelie Court, the group challenge the King for a trial by combat for Kieran's release, with Emma becoming a champion. She briefly hesitates when her opponent assumes her father's face, but manages to kill him. As the group leave with an amnesiac Kieran, they are pursued by the Unseelie faeries until a Seelie faerie, Nene, arrives at the last second to take them to the Seelie Queen. Nene is revealed to be Mark's aunt, sister of his mother, Nerissa.

Back in Los Angeles, Kit, Ty, and Livvy spy on Zara, who wants to take over the Institute and plans to destroy all Downworlders. When they return, they see the Blackthorns' uncle, Arthur, rambling incoherently, and are told about his condition by Diana Wrayburn. The Institute is subsequently attacked by a resurrected Malcolm Fade, still demanding a Blackthorn sacrifice. Arthur sacrifices himself while Diana portals herself and everyone else to the London Institute. Malcolm kills Arthur to bring back his lover, Annabel Blackthorn, who immediately kills him before walking away with the Black Volume.

The entire event is watched by Julian. The Seelie Queen offers Julian a way to break his parabatai bond with Emma in exchange for retrieving the Black Volume, then asks the others for help to overthrow the Unseelie King. She chooses Kieran to become ambassador between the Shadowhunters and faeries. Kieran in turn pledges fealty to Cristina. To keep him contented, Mark and Emma agree to stop pretending to be in a relationship with each other. The group then ride with the Wild Hunt towards the London Institute, where they reunite with the others.

After, Kit meets the ghost of Jessamine Lovelace and obtains information about Malcolm's former home in England, located in Polperro. Heading there, Emma and Julian learn the full story of Malcolm and Annabel's past: the two were captured when they attempted to leave with the Black Volume, with Annabel being executed after she was led to believe that Malcolm abandoned her. Annabel briefly visits Julian but refuses to hand over the Black Volume. From a faerie, Julian and Emma learn about the church where Annabel was resurrected in Talland. However, it turns out to be a trap and the two have no choice but to burn the church down using a heightened form of their parabatai bond.

Back at London, Kit, Ty, and Livvy visit the former Blackthorn Manor and find a crystal containing Annabel's memories. Afterwards, they visit the local Shadow Market, meeting a warlock named Shade, who helps them extract the memories. When demons attack them, Magnus Bane arrives to help them return to the Institute. Kit and Ty discover a hidden passage to the Cornwall Institute and leave behind a letter for Annabel. Cristina gets close with Kieran and follows him when he visits his brother, Adaon, to convince him to take over the Unseelie throne upon their father's death. However, they are ambushed by another brother, Erec. Kieran kills Erec, but not before the latter tells him that their father has sent the Riders of Mannan to hunt the group.

Dru is secretly visited by Diego's brother, Jaime, and lets him see Cristina. He tells her that Zara is engaged to Diego so she can take the Rosales family heirloom, the Eternidad, which is currently in Jaime's possession. Dru touches the Eternidad and is briefly transported to Faerie, where she meets a boy named Ash. When Cristina and Kieran try to contact Adaon again, they are linked to the Unseelie King, who tries to manipulate Kieran by returning his memories. Kieran is upset, but is convinced by Cristina to forgive Mark.

Meanwhile, Diana heads to Idris to talk with Consul Penhallow. She begins dating Gwyn, confessing that she is transgender, which is the reason why she refuses Penhallow's offer to lead the Los Angeles Institute, as she does not want to be outed. The two save Kit, Ty, and Livvy when they are attacked by the Riders, who also attack Emma and Julian until the former manages to kill one of them. Diana discovers that patches of dying lands have appeared in Idris and learns that they are not an isolated incident. Magnus brings Emma and Julian back to the London Institute. There, the Riders once again attack but are defeated by Annabel, who received Ty's message and came to their aid. She agrees to testify at the Clave and give Julian the Black Volume, which he takes a copy with his phone, if she is protected by Magnus and given the Blackthorn Manor. Magnus removes Cristina's and Mark's curse and also advises Julian to talk to the Inquisitor, Robert Lightwood, so Emma and Julian can voluntarily exile and legally have a relationship.

Emma, Cristina, and the Blackthorns set towards Idris, while Diego takes Kieran to the Scholomance for his safety. The Blackthorns reunite with their eldest sister, Helen, now married to the Consul's daughter, Aline. When it is Annabel's turn to be interrogated, Magnus suddenly falls ill, rendering him unable to protect her. She is repeatedly insulted and experiences flashbacks of her previous interrogation. Freaking out, she steals the Mortal Sword and kills Robert with it before engaging in a frenzied murder among the Clave. Confronting her, Emma surprisingly manages to destroy the Mortal Sword with her own sword, Cortana. However, Annabel uses the shards to kill Livvy. As Julian is left to cradle Livvy, Emma tries to follow Annabel but fails, only glimpsing her taking off with the Unseelie King before disappearing to parts unknown.

== Characters ==
- Emma Carstairs - a 17-year-old Shadowhunter that has lived most of her life in the Los Angeles Institute with the Blackthorn family after her parents were killed in the Dark War. She has brown eyes, long, pale blond hair, and pale skin, with many scars, including a deep scar up her right arm. Emma is a passionate and hardworking Shadowhunter and sometimes considered the best of her generation. She owns the sword Cortana.
- Julian "Jules" Blackthorn - another 17-year-old Shadowhunter who has lived his entire life at the Los Angeles Institute. He lives there alongside his siblings and Emma Carstairs, his best friend and parabatai. Julian has dark brown messy hair and startling blue-green eyes. He is described as tall and slender, lanky, with high cheekbones. As an artist, he is usually seen untidy or splattered with paint. His main concern is for his younger siblings, as they are all orphans and he feels responsible for them.
- Mark Blackthorn - a Shadowhunter residing at the Los Angeles Institute and is one of the many Blackthorn children. He was a former Hunter who rode with the Wild Hunt. He and his older sister, Helen, have the same faerie mother and are part-faerie. He is 21 years old (as of 2012) and is described as being tall, thin, with broad shoulders and the signature blue-green eyes of the Blackthorns. However, since Mark became part of the Wild Hunt; his right eye has since turned gold. Like Helen, he also has pointed ears and curly white-gold hair.
- Tiberius "Ty" Nero Blackthorn - a Shadowhunter from the Los Angeles Institute. He is 15 years old as of 2012. Tiberius, unlike most of his siblings, has black hair and gray eyes, as opposed to the family's trademark brown hair and blue-green eyes. Ty is autistic and thinks and acts differently from his siblings; however Shadowhunters do not know about or understand autism.
- Livia "Livvy" Blackthorn - the twin sister of Tiberius Blackthorn, as well as the sister of Jules, Dru, and Tavvy, and the half-sister of Helen and Mark. She lives at the Los Angeles Institute with her siblings, under the guardianship of their uncle, Arthur. She is 15 years old as of 2012. Livia, like her other siblings, has the Blackthorn brown hair and blue-green eyes. Livvy was born with gray eyes like her twin, Tiberius, though hers had changed to blue-green since.
- Drusilla "Dru" Blackthorn - a 13-year-old Shadowhunter from the Blackthorn family who lives at the Los Angeles Institute. She has the Blackthorns' signature dark brown hair and blue-green eyes. She is quite tall for her age. Her body has since already gone through puberty early, showing off her curves to the point where Dru, at thirteen, has been mistaken for seventeen or eighteen years old by mundane boys. This has made her very self-conscious about her body because unlike most Shadowhunters who are wiry or muscular, she is round-bodied and doesn't fit into the gear designed for girls in her age group. Drusilla is quite shy.
- Octavian "Tavvy" Blackthorn - a Shadowhunter of the Blackthorn family and is the youngest in their family. He resides in the Los Angeles Institute. He is 7 years old as of 2012. Tavvy shares the Blackthorn family's dark brown hair and blue-green eyes. According to Jules, he is quite small and thin for his age. He likes paints because they soothe him.
- Cristina "Tina" Mendoza-Rosales - a Shadowhunter from Mexico who came to the Los Angeles Institute and became fast friends with the Institute ward Emma Carstairs. She is 18 years old as of 2012. She has dark brown eyes and long, black hair. Cristina is a generally wise, composed, and gentle person. She is principled and thoughtful, strong and unwavering in her loyalty and morals.
- Diego Rocío Rosales - one of the youngest Centurions to ever graduate from the Scholomance. He is 19 years old as of 2012. Diego has thick, dark hair. He is often referred to by the other characters as "Perfect Diego".
- Diana Wrayburn - a Shadowhunter who used to run a weapons shop called Diana's Arrow in Alicante. After the Dark War, Diana volunteered to be stationed at Los Angeles to become the tutor of the Blackthorn children. Diana has black hair and dark skin. On her cheek is a tattoo of a silver koi fish.
- Arthur Blackthorn - the current head of the Los Angeles Institute and the uncle of the Blackthorn children Mark, Helen, Julian, Livia, Tiberius, Drusilla, and Octavian. Arthur resembles his brother, Andrew Blackthorn, albeit smaller and paler. He has a slight figure, a round face, brown hair, and the trademark Blackthorn blue-green eyes. He also wears spectacles.
- Malcolm Fade - a very powerful warlock and the High Warlock of Los Angeles. Malcolm is a tall man with an angular face, white hair, and purple eyes. He is strangely attractive. He has the appearance of a twenty-seven-year-old man.
- Annabel Callisto Blackthorn- Malcolm Fade's former lover from centuries before. She was walled up alive in a tomb by her family when they found out that she was in love with Malcolm. Her death was hidden from Malcolm but he eventually found out through Edgar Allan Poe's poem, "Annabel Lee". Diving into a wild obsession by the loss of her, Malcolm found a spell and raised her from the dead centuries after. She, however, was driven insane by her awakening from the dead. She killed Malcolm and later on ran off with the Black Volume of the Dead, a spellbook formerly crucial to Malcolm's plans which contained dangerous spells capable of destroying the world.
- Kieran - a faerie and a member of the Wild Hunt. He is one of the Unseelie King's many children and is thus considered a prince of the Unseelie Court. Kieran is said to be beautiful—inhumanly so—and fierce. He has high cheekbones and wide spaced eyes, the left black and the right a deep silver. He is pale and his body is lithe and graceful. As a prince of Faerie, Kieran wears battered white gauntlets. His thick hair changes color—specifically colors of the sea, due in part to his nixie heritage—depending on his mood, though he could also change them at will.
- Johnny Rook - a mysterious figure who ran a booth at the Los Angeles Shadow Market. He is described as having blond graying hair and blue eyes. Johnny rarely showed affection, but when he did, it was only for his son, Kit.
- Christopher "Kit" Rook - a Shadowhunter who was raised as a mundane, previously unaware of his heritage. He was born Christopher Jonathan Herondale and is the son of the man who called himself Johnny Rook. He and Johnny are descendants of the notorious Tobias Herondale and his lost line. He is described as having blond hair and blue eyes.
- Magnus Bane - The High Warlock of Brooklyn. Being over four centuries old, his life has since intertwined with several Shadowhunters and Downworlders over the centuries, but being a warlock still appears to be nineteen years old. Magnus has brown skin, is very tall, with a long and lean body. His main warlock mark is his yellow-green "cat-like eyes" with vertical pupils. He is also noted to have a somewhat Asian appearance, due to the curve of his eyes. He has dark black hair. He wears all kinds of make-up, such as glitter around his eyes, lipstick, and nail polish. He likes to flaunt his beauty by often dressing in flamboyant and glitzy ensembles. He arrived at the Los Angeles Institute to investigate a flare of necromantic magic.
- Theresa "Tessa" Gray - an American warlock; half-Shadowhunter, half-Eidolon demon. She moved to London in 1878 and her life has since been entangled in the lives of the Nephilim. Tessa has wavy brown hair, steely gray-blue eyes, an oval face, and a slender body. She is around 5'9. While she used to think herself average, several of her friends have called her not conventionally beautiful, but kindly attractive. Being immortal, Tessa appears to be a young woman in her early twenties.
- James "Jem" Carstairs - an inactive Shadowhunter and a former Silent Brother. Once an orphan living in the London Institute in the 1870s, along with his parabatai, Will Herondale, he is now a mortal who is over a hundred years old, cured of his illness. Jem's hair is dark brown, almost black, with only a single silver streak remaining, and his eyes are dark brown with gold flecks. Due to his stagnancy as a Silent Brother, Jem maintained his youthful appearance, looking like someone in his early twenties, though his wisdom and experiences in his long life as a Silent Brother reflects in his eyes.
- Gwyn ap Nudd - AKA Gwyn the Hunter, is a faerie and the leader of the Wild Hunt. He has heterochromia iridum; one of his eyes is black, and the other is a very pale blue. He is also described as a big, broad man with a beard, wide eyes, broad cheekbones, and wicked eyebrows. He shows great interest in Diana Wrayburn and even took her on a picnic in Brocelind Forest.
- Ash - is a 13-year-old faerie that Drusilla Blackthorn meets in 2012 when she accidentally touched the Rosales family heirloom and was sucked into Faerie. Drusilla finds Ash in a room with walls decorated all over with symbols like a hawk, a throne and a broken crown (the symbol of the Unseelie Court). Ash seems to be very demanding, being aware of his high rank and using it to command people around. On the other side, he seems to be very easy to surprise and is very much curious about the things happening around him. He has short, white-blond hair, green eyes and appears to be around the age of 13. His face is typically sharp for a faerie and he wears rich clothes made of silk and velvet, combined with heavy boots. There is also a little, pale metal band around his head, seeming like a crown.
- Nene - is a faerie healer of the Seelie Court, and is the sister of Lady Nerissa. She is also a handmaiden for the Seelie Queen. She is described to as a gentle and kind faerie with pale blond hair bound back with ropes of flowers. In 2012, Nene helped Mark, Julian Blackthorn, Emma Carstairs, and Cristina Rosales rescue Kieran from his father, the Unseelie King. She shot burning arrows into the sky to cover their escape, and opened a door to the Seelie Court for them.

== Reception ==
RT Book Reviews gave the book four and a half stars, marking it as a top pick and stating "The Infernal Devices devotees will find this a bittersweet return as current characters find reminders of their Victorian predecessors while they wrestle with present adversity." A reviewer for the Deseret News also reviewed Lord of Shadows, writing 'Aside from the traumatic ending, readers can expect to enjoy a quick read despite the book's length — this is the sort of book readers can expect to read well into the night.' Booklist claimed that not all of the characters are developed and the book drags on for 700 pages but it has enough to satisfy fans of the series. Common Sense Media also reviewed the book, claiming that it was melodramatic but it had enough intrigue to keep the readers interest.

It was a Publishers Weekly 2017 bestseller.
