= The Bane Chronicles =

2014 novella collection

- Cover of the compiled book
- Authors: Cassandra Clare, Sarah Rees Brennan, Maureen Johnson
- Cover artist: Malak Abdelmuati
- Language: English
- Genre: Fiction
- Publisher: Simon & Schuster
- Publication date: April 16, 2013 – March 18, 2014 (print edition November 11, 2014)
- Publication place: USA
- Media type: e-book, audio, print
- Pages: 544

The Bane Chronicles is a series of connected novellas featuring the character of Magnus Bane from Cassandra Clare's The Mortal Instruments series. The novellas are co-written by Clare, Maureen Johnson, and Sarah Rees Brennan. Release of the novellas began in April 2013 in e-book and audio versions, and were released in a combined print edition in November 2014. The Bane Chronicles has appeared on the New York Times Bestsellers list for Children's Books a number of times beginning in July 2013.

== Development ==
Clare, Johnson, and Brennan have stated that development on the series began when they were telling stories about Clare's character of Magnus Bane to each other. They decided that the non-traditional style of interconnected novellas would be best served by initial Internet publication. The series is also notable for using well-known actors as narrators for the audiobook versions of each novella. The authors provided a list of dream narrators to their publisher, and each audiobook has a different narrator, including Andrew Scott, Michael Trevino, and Jesse Williams. For some of the actors, this was their first time doing voice work.

The first 10 stories were released between April 2013 and March 2014, and the compiled print version, released in November 2014, contained an eleventh story exclusive to the book.

== Novellas ==
- What Really Happened in Peru (with Sarah Rees Brennan)
  - Release Date: April 16, 2013
  - Narrator: Jesse Williams
- The Runaway Queen (with Maureen Johnson)
  - Release Date: May 21, 2013
  - Narrator: George Blagden
- Vampires, Scones and Edmund Herondale (with Sarah Rees Brennan)
  - Release Date: June 18, 2013
  - Narrator: Andrew Scott
- The Midnight Heir (with Sarah Rees Brennan)
  - Release Date: July 16, 2013
  - Narrator: David Oyelowo
- The Rise of the Hotel Dumort (with Maureen Johnson)
  - Release Date: August 20, 2013
  - Narrator: Stephen Lunsford
- Saving Raphael Santiago (with Sarah Rees Brennan)
  - Release Date: September 17, 2013
  - Narrator: Michael Trevino
- Fall of the Hotel Dumort (with Maureen Johnson)
  - Release Date: October 15, 2013
  - Narrator: Cecil Baldwin (of Welcome to Night Vale)
- What To Buy The Shadowhunter Who Has Everything (And Who You're Not Officially Dating Anyway)
  - Release Date: November 19, 2013
  - Narrator Jordan Gavaris
- The Last Stand of the New York Institute (with Maureen Johnson and Sarah Rees Brennan)
  - Release Date: December 17, 2013
  - Narrator: Jamie Bamber
- The Course of True Love (and First Dates)
  - Release Date: March 18, 2014
  - Narrator: Gareth David-Lloyd
- The Voicemail of Magnus Bane
  - Release Date: November 11, 2014 (exclusively in full book print version)
  - Narrators: Seth Numrich and Molly C. Quinn (exclusively in full book audio version)
