= City of Fallen Angels =

2011 fantasy novel by Cassandra Clare

- Cover of the book released in December 2010
- Author: Cassandra Clare
- Cover artist: Cliff Nielsen
- Language: English
- Series: The Mortal Instruments
- Genre: Fantasy, Adventure
- Published: April 5, 2011
- Publisher: Margaret K. McElderry Books
- Publication place: United States
- Media type: Print (hardback & paperback)
- Pages: 432
- Preceded by: City of Glass
- Followed by: City of Lost Souls

City of Fallen Angels is the fourth book in The Mortal Instruments series by Cassandra Clare. The series was meant to end with City of Glass; it was announced in March 2010 that a fourth book would be added, with Cassandra Clare later saying that she views this as a "second trilogy" in the series. The book was released on April 5, 2011.

== Background ==
City of Fallen Angels is the fourth installment in the Mortal Instruments series. It is the first book published by Margaret K. McElderry, an imprint of Simon & Schuster. Its sequel, City of Lost Souls, was released in May 2012.

== Plot ==
Simon receives an offer from Camille Belcourt, a vampire who claims to have been usurped by Raphael Santiago. She says that if Simon joins her side as the Daylighter, he will earn his place in the vampire society. After his meeting, he returns home worried about what his mother would think, as she has been suspicious since he went to Idris in City of Glass and did not return for a few days. Although Magnus Bane erased memories of his absence, she was still subconsciously suspicious about his whereabouts.

Simon is attacked several times. Each time, the Mark of Cain placed on him by Clary works, and anyone who tries to attack him dies. At home, his mother confronts him about the blood she has found hidden in his closet, and he is forced to tell her what he has become. She believes that he is no longer her son and begins to pray. Desperate, he tells her that it s a bad dream and she believes him, with the help of his vampiric persuasion powers. Knowing that he cannot go back to his mother's house, he moves in with his band's new member, Jordan Kyle. While visiting Simon's apartment, Jace realizes that Kyle is a werewolf.

Meanwhile, Jace has been having dreams in which he murders Clary, which makes him want to avoid her. This makes Clary worry about their relationship. Clary and her mother Jocelyn also discover that someone is trying to create more demonic children like Sebastian when they see a baby with clawed hands and black eyes at the hospital.

While performing at a concert, Simon runs off stage, ill from lack of blood consumption. Maureen, a fourteen-year-old, follows Simon and asks for his picture. Simon bites her and drinks her blood but is interrupted by Kyle. Simon is then confronted by Maia and Isabelle. They are furious at him for secretly dating both of them. Halfway through the argument, Kyle shows up. Before he can say anything, Maia recognizes and attacks him, only to be stopped by Simon and Isabelle. It turns out that Kyle is actually Maia's ex-boyfriend who turned her into a werewolf.

The following day, they receive a message saying someone is holding Simon's girlfriend hostage, and he should go save her. Calling up Clary, Isabelle, and Maia, Simon determines it is a joke, only to later find the caller was actually referring to Maureen, who always claims to be Simon's girlfriend at concerts. Maureen is killed when Simon fails to save her.

Clary then goes to the Church of Talto and fights a Hydra demon with the help of Isabelle. Later, Jace and Clary share an intimate moment in the institute. On the point of taking a further step in their relationship, Jace injures Clary with a knife. Jace breaks down and reveals why he was avoiding Clary. Clary offers to take him to the Silent City to get help from the Silent Brothers.

The Silent Brothers reveal the nightmares are due to his vulnerability to demonic influence, after Jace was resurrected by the angel Raziel. All Shadowhunters are subject to a ritual to protect them as infants. As Jace died, it was like he had been reborn without the protection. Wanting to perform the ritual again to give him the protection, the Brothers make Clary leave. In his cell, Jace dream that he is back in Idris. Max appears to Jace and says the dreams mean that Jace is actually hurting Clary. Jace cuts his arms after Max convinces him that he will destroy the rotten part of him. With his blood, Max, who is actually the demon Lilith, draws a rune on his chest which puts him under her influence.

Jocelyn and Luke, now engaged, hold a party. Clary disappears after being kidnapped by Jace to which no one else knows about yet. He had lied to Clary about leaving the Brothers early. Jace tells Clary about a rune that binds them to one another forever. Clary accepts and hands him her stele. He begins to draw a rune, but Clary finds out too late that this is not the rune he told her about as she begins to lose consciousness with Jace catching her and carrying her away. Simon also disappears from the party. He is led away from it by Maureen, now a vampire, and is taken to Lilith, who has been alive since the beginning of time. She had turned up at one of Simon's concerts and introduced herself as a promoter called Satrina. She needs him to bring Sebastian back from the dead. According to her, Simon has had the power to revive the dead ever since he became a Daylighter. In order to persuade him to resurrect Sebastian, she had possessed Jace and ordered him to kidnap Clary. Jace brings Clary to Lilith, who orders him to kill Clary if Simon does not resurrect Sebastian. Simon reluctantly bites Sebastian and drains some of his blood.

Isabelle, Alec, Maia, and Jordan follow Simon to the address on Satrina's business card they found in his wallet. When they get to the building, instead of finding Simon, they find the place that Lilith used as her nursery, with all the children dead. Every one of them had clawed hands and black eyes. The babies were the outcome of Lilith trying to make half-demon children like Sebastian. While going through the room, Isabelle discovers the mother of one of the babies.

Meanwhile, Clary tricks Jace by saying she does not wish to watch and he embraces her. She then grabs Jace's knife and cuts the rune that Lilith is using to possess him, causing Jace to be freed from Lilith's control. Jace tells Clary to run away and believes that she did, but then Lilith reveals that Clary stayed and starts torturing her with a whip. Jace says he will do what she wants if she lets Clary go, but Lilith wants and intends to torture her to madness. Simon eventually kills Lilith by throwing himself between her and Clary. This way, Lilith unintentionally hits Simon, inflicting the Mark of Cain on herself. The Clave later appears. Jace and Clary share an intimate moment on the roof. Jace is ashamed of his actions despite having had no control over himself. Clary says she loves him no matter what, and the two share a kiss. She then goes to the lobby to meet her mother, Luke, Simon, Maia, Alec, Magnus, and Isabelle, promising to come back in five minutes.

Jace's rune heals while he hears Sebastian's voice in his head. Jace is forced to finish the awakening ritual on Sebastian, who is now fully alive.

== Characters ==
=== Shadowhunters ===
- Clarissa "Clary" Fray: A young Shadowhunter raised in the human world, Clary finally ready for formal training after the imminent war ends. As she awaits a new tutor, her boyfriend Jace, also a Shadowhunter, takes on the responsibility of training her.
- Jace Herondale: Clary's Shadowhunter boyfriend, who is struggling after being resurrected.
- Sebastian Morgenstern: Clary's demonic brother, who was killed by Jace after he killed Jace's adoptive brother.
- Alexander "Alec" Lightwood: Jace's parabatai, who is in a relationship with warlock Magnus Bane.
- Isabelle "Izzy" Lightwood: Alec's Shadowhunter sister, who falls for Simon, Clary's vampire best friend.
- Jocelyn Fray: Clary's mother, who had tried to hide Clary's Shadowhunter heritage to protect her.
- Maryse Lightwood: Alec and Isabelle's mother, who leads the New York Institute.
- Brother Zachariah: An unusual Silent Brother who helps the group.

=== Downworlders ===
- Simon Lewis: Clary's vampire best friend, who became a rare Daylighter after being turned. He also bears the curse of the Mark of Cain.
- Magnus Bane: The High Warlock of Brooklyn, who helps the Conclave for Alec.
- Luke Garroway: Jocelyn's best friend and fiancé, who acts as a father figure for Clary.
- Maia Roberts: A member of Luke's werewolf pack in New York.
- Jordan Kyle: A werewolf and a member of the Praetor Lupus, who got close to Simon to approach a girl in Simon's life.
- Camille Belcourt: The leader of the vampire clan of New York and a former lover of Magnus Bane.

=== Demons ===
- Lilith: A greater demon who wants to bring back to life Jonathan Morgenstern as she is his demonic blood donor.

=== Mundanes ===
- Elaine Lewis: Simon's mother who is beginning to become suspicious of Simon's strange behavior.
- Simon's band: Simon's mundane friends and bandmates who know he is a vampire.
- Maureen Brown: A groupie following Simon's band who is infatuated with him.

== Reception ==
The Manila Bulletin gave a mixed review, writing that, "when it departs from Simon's story is when it is at its most weakest". Common Sense Media gave the book four stars and wrote "Exciting entry in bestselling series has creepy cult stuff."
