= City of Ashes =

2008 urban fantasy novel by Cassandra Clare

- American cover for City of Ashes.
- Author: Cassandra Clare
- Cover artist: Cliff Nielsen
- Language: English
- Series: The Mortal Instruments
- Genre: Fantasy adventure Urban fantasy
- Publisher: Margaret K. McElderry
- Publication date: March 25, 2008 (U.S.)
- Publication place: United States
- Media type: Print (hardback & paperback)
- Pages: 464 pages (hardcover); 416 pages (paperback)
- ISBN: 1-4169-1429-3
- Preceded by: City of Bones
- Followed by: City of Glass

City of Ashes is the second installment in The Mortal Instruments series, an urban fantasy series set in New York written by Cassandra Clare. The novel was one of YALSA's top ten teen books for 2009.

== Background ==
City of Ashes is the second installment in the Mortal Instruments series. It is the first book published by Margaret K. McElderry, an imprint of Simon & Schuster. Its sequel, City of Glass, was released in March 2009. The cover features Clarissa Fray.

== Plot ==
Clary returns to the Institute after receiving a text message from Isabelle "Izzy" Lightwood, saying that Jace angered the Inquisitor, Imogen Herondale. He has been imprisoned in the Silent City and is awaiting trial by the Soul Sword to determine if he is telling the truth about being in league with Valentine. The Sword is one of the Mortal Instruments, alongside the Cup and the Mirror. While the Cup is capable of creating new Shadowhunters, the Sword forces Shadowhunters to tell the truth. Valentine kills the Silent Brothers to obtain the Sword.

Clary, Izzy, and Alec respond to a distress call from the Silent City but arrive too late. Clary frees Jace using an amplified version of the opening rune that appears to her amidst her panic. The Inquisitor appears, along with a group of Shadowhunters, and accuses Jace of helping Valentine.

Magnus Bane is called to the scene by Alec, and offers to keep Jace as a prisoner in his apartment, while he and the others try to figure out Valentine's plans. Magnus and Alec have gotten closer to each other, and have even gone on a date. This is detailed in the Bane Chronicles, a tag-a-long book to the series.

Jace receives an offer from the Queen of the Seelie to visit her court. Jace, Simon, Izzy and Clary try to convince her to aid them in the defeat of Valentine. The Queen says she is not sure if she will help and mentions their court knows deep secrets, like how Jace and Clary are their father's experiments come to life. Confused, the group decides to leave.

However, Clary is tricked into consuming faerie food, and is only able to leave by kissing "whom she most desires". Simon offers to kiss her, but the Queen reveals he is not the one "she desires most". This is hurtful because Clary has been repeatedly attempting to date Simon, in order to squash her feelings for Jace, her brother. Clary and Izzy suggest that the kiss might be from Jace. The three are reluctant at first because Clary is Jace's sister, but after Izzy insists that she too would kiss Alec to free him, Jace kisses Clary. The kiss becomes passionate, and afterwards, Clary is free, proving that Jace's kiss is the one she most desires. This upsets Simon, who storms off after they return to their realm. Jace and Clary confess their love to each other. Clary is torn between her love for Jace, and the taboo against it because they are blood relatives. Jace suggests keeping a secret relationship. Clary, unwilling to lie to their friends and family, replies that it would eventually be discovered.

Later, the vampire Raphael shows up at the Institute with Simon, who is on the verge of death. Apparently, Simon's initial intake of vampire blood as a rat made him believe he was turning into a vampire, and he went to the Hotel DuMort to see Raphael. He then was devoured by vampires, mixing his blood with theirs.

Simon is buried and transforms into a vampire. A distraught Clary ignores Jace as a result of her concern over Simon and his new vampire status. While discussing how to potentially tell Simon's mother about his vampire transformation with Clary, Maia the werewolf comes into the house with wounds too severe for Luke to treat. Magnus heals her while Luke decides to check outside the house to see if the demons are still there. Luke is attacked and gets badly injured. Jace, Simon, and Clary battle the demons, who flee after seeing Clary's rune on her forearm which she got during a dream of her mother blessing her.

They return to the house to rest with the others and end up talking about the powerful rune Clary used to free Jace earlier. Clary reveals it was something she just thought of, and everyone opposes her, saying that runes can only be created by angels. Clary is dared to make a new rune, and she ends up making a "Fearless" rune, as suggested by Jace. They try it on Alec, whose parents and sister arrive then. Alec approaches his parents, saying he is seeing someone who is a Downworlder. Magnus silences him before he says who he is dating. Alec claims not to remember anything. He gets nervous and defensive when asked who he is dating, leading them to believe that the rune worked.

Everyone decides to sleep, but Jace secretly takes Raphael's motorcycle and meets Valentine at a ship. Valentine offers protection to his loved ones if Jace joins him and comes back to Idris with him. The next morning, the Inquisitor, knowing of that meeting, once again imprisons Jace, planning to make a trade with Valentine - Jace's life for the Sword. Jace tries to tell her that it will not work, which the Inquisitor refuses to believe and devises a plan of revenge on Valentine, who had killed her son, Stephen Herondale.

While traveling to see Simon, Maia is attacked by a demon, who comes to her in the form of her dead brother, after which Valentine kidnaps her.

Clary and the others rescue Maia with the help of Magnus, but not before Valentine drains Simon's blood. Jace manages to restore life to Simon by feeding him his blood, after which the Inquisitor appears. After seeing Jace's star-shaped scar on his shoulder, the Inquisitor begins to suggest something about who his parents are, but she jumps in front of Jace, saving him from a demon before she can finish. She later dies, leaving Jace confused at her sudden change of heart.

Meanwhile, one of Valentine's demons kidnap Clary. At his boat, Valentine intimidates her with the Sword. Jace and Simon rescue her and Valentine admits that Jace only chose to fight on his side because he loves Clary more than a sister. He knew of this when Jace saw a demon that transforms into the thing you fear the most, which appeared to him in the form of Clary dying. The second time he saw the demon it appeared to him as Valentine, and Jace continued to kill the demon. Clary draws an opening rune on the ship's metal, which causes all of the ship's pieces to open up, making it explode. Clary falls in the river and is saved by the nixies the Queen sent to help. The group escapes by truck, where Simon discovers that Jace's blood has made him a "Daylighter", a vampire that can tolerate the sun's light. After a talk with Luke about love and his regrets of not telling Clary's mother how he felt about her, Clary decides to tell Jace of her love for him and her sudden change of mind to start a relationship, regardless of its consequences. However, before she can say anything, Jace tells her that he will only act as her brother from then on, breaking her heart. As Clary reels from this, she meets a woman who introduces herself as one of Jocelyn's friends and says she knows how to wake up Clary's mother.

== Characters ==
=== Shadowhunters ===
- Clarissa Adele "Clary" Fray: She is a seemingly normal human, discovers a hidden world of Shadowhunters – supernatural beings who fight demons. She learns she is one of them, her father is the infamous villain Valentine Morgenstern, and her beloved friend Jace is both a Shadowhunter and her brother. This revelation upends her life, forcing her to embrace her newfound powers and confront the darkness that surrounds her family.
- Jonathan Christopher "Jace" Wayland: Jace is a complex and troubled character. He is a Shadowhunter, a warrior trained to fight demons, and he is also the son of Valentine Morgenstern, the series' main antagonist. Jace struggles with his identity and his connection to his father, and he is often arrogant and reckless. However, he also cares deeply for his friends and family, and he is ultimately willing to sacrifice himself for them. He is one of Clary's love interests.
- Alexander Gideon "Alec" Lightwood: Alec, a Shadowhunter, grapples with his sexuality, which is taboo in his society. His relationship with Magnus Bane, a warlock, creates complications amidst his parabatai bond and family ties. He discovers that his parabatai, Jace, has feelings for Clary, who is revealed to be his sister. Clary, an ordinary human, is thrust into the world of Shadowhunters after her mother's disappearance.
- Isabelle Sophia "Izzy" Lightwood: Isabelle is a powerful Shadowhunter, known for her strength and ferocity. She is also a rebellious daughter who defies authority. This suggests she's a complex character with both a strong sense of duty and a strong sense of independence is unclear and may be a mistake or incomplete thought.
- Valentine Morgenstern: Valentine, thought deceased for years, has resurfaced, aiming to destroy both Shadowhunters and Downworlders. His return is a shock, and he's considered a dangerous adversary due to his skills and charisma.
- Jocelyn Fray: Clary's mother entered a magical coma to protect her daughter from Valentine, preventing him from using the Mortal Cup she touched to his advantage.
- Maryse Lightwood: She is a strong and capable Shadowhunter, but she also has a dark side that is revealed as the story progresses. She was once a member of the Circle, a group of Shadowhunters who were radicalized by Valentine Morgenstern, the main antagonist of the series. Maryse's past actions come back to haunt her in City of Ashes, as she is forced to confront the consequences of her choices. She is also struggling to come to terms with her son Alec's sexuality, which is a source of conflict between them.
- Robert Lightwood: Robert is revealed to be a member of the Circle, a group of Shadowhunters who were radicalized by Valentine Morgenstern, the main antagonist of the series. This revelation has a major impact on his family and the Shadowhunter community.
- Max Lightwood: He is the youngest child of Maryse and Robert Lightwood, and the brother of Alec, Isabelle, and Jace. Max is still very young in this book, and he doesn't play a large role in the story. However, he is a sweet and innocent child who is loved by his family.
- Imogen Herondale: An Inquisitor, driven by personal revenge, travels to New York to investigate Valentine's son.

=== Mundanes ===
- Simon Lewis: Clary's geeky, mundane best friend who inevitably joins Clary and the Shadowhunters because of his feelings for her.

=== Downworlders ===
- Magnus Bane: the High Warlock of Brooklyn who decides to help the Conclave for Alec.
- Luke Garroway: Valentine's former parabatai before Turning into a werewolf, Luke is a close friend of Jocelyn who helped raise Clary.
- Maia Roberts: a member of Luke's New York werewolf pack.
- Raphael Santiago: leader of the New York vampire clan.
- Seelie Queen: the queen of the Seelie Court of the Fair Folk.
- Meliorn: the queen's personal knight and confidante, Meliorn has a past connection with a certain Lightwood.

== Reception ==
The Duluth News Tribune praised City of Ashes, calling the book "gripping". The School Library Journal also praised the novel, comparing it to "like watching a particularly good vampire/werewolf movie". Kirkus Reviews enjoyed the book but warned that the "incestuous overtones might be too disturbing for some". Common Sense Media gave the book four stars, calling it "gripping" while warning parents of the violence and potential incest. Seventeen Magazine gave a positive review, saying that the book was "smart, funny, romantic".

== Cancelled film adaptation ==
The film based on the second book titled The Mortal Instruments: City of Ashes was planned for production in 2014, but was cancelled.
