= City of Glass (Clare novel) =

2009 fantasy novel by Cassandra Clare

- American cover of the book City of Glass.
- Author: Cassandra Clare
- Cover artist: Cliff Nielsen
- Language: English
- Series: The Mortal Instruments
- Genre: Fantasy adventure
- Publisher: Margaret K. McElderry
- Publication date: March 24, 2009
- Publication place: United States
- Media type: Print (hardback & paperback)
- Pages: 560 pages (hardback, first edition); 496 pages (paperback)
- ISBN: 1-4169-1430-7
- Preceded by: City of Ashes
- Followed by: City of Fallen Angels

City of Glass is the third book in the urban fantasy series The Mortal Instruments by Cassandra Clare. In 2009, Walker Books published the third book of the series worldwide. It explores Simon's and Clary's experience in the Shadowhunter city, and Clary works on saving her mother, as they travel from the New York institute to Alicante, Idris.

== Background ==
City of Glass is the third installment in the Mortal Instruments series. It is the first book published by Margaret K. McElderry, an imprint of Simon & Schuster. Its sequel, City of Fallen Angels, was released in April 2011.

== Plot ==
Clary is at Luke's house with Simon packing for her trip to Idris, where her goal is to save her mother. Jace tries to persuade Simon to lie and say that Clary decided not to go to Idris, in order to protect her from the Clave, which he feels will try to turn her into a weapon. When Clary visits the Institute, Magnus tells her that the Lightwoods had to travel through the portal, due to an attack by Forsaken. During the battle, Simon is injured and Jace takes him to Idris to save his life. With her power to create runes, Clary manages to create a portal, which she uses to travel with Luke.

Pulled through the portal, Simon wakes up in Alicante and realizes the truth behind Jace's motivation to not make Clary come to Idris. Later at the Penhallow house, he meets Sebastian Verlac and Aline Penhallow. After a while, Alec comes back from the Clave meeting to tell Simon that he will be sent back to New York by Aldertree, the new Inquisitor. When Simon arrives to leave for home, it is revealed as a trap to incriminate the Lightwoods so as to bring people back to the Clave's trust and he is imprisoned and questioned on his new ability to walk in daylight as a vampire. After the questioning, he befriends fellow inmate Samuel Blackburn.

After opening the portal and going through it, Clary falls into Lake Lyn and Luke saves her, but as she comes out, she starts to hallucinate as the lake is revealed to be harmful to the Nephilim. Luke decides to take her to his sister, Amatis. After treatment, she wakes up to meet Amatis and is warned that she is not allowed to see Jace. Even with such risk, she sneaks out and finds Jace in the Penhallow house library, kissing Aline. After seeing this, Clary gets into a fight with Jace and runs away. Sebastian eventually joins Clary and drops her back to Amatis's home, who is disappointed at her actions.

Later, Alec finds out that Simon never made it back home and is imprisoned in Alicante. At night, Jace goes to visit and save Simon, who refuses to escape, because it would shine suspicions on the Lightwoods. The next morning, Simon finds that Isabelle has left blood for him in his cell. Raphael later informs him that he is now being hunted by every Downworlder, because of his Daylighter powers. In the morning, Clary is woken up by Sebastian to find Ragnor Fell, but instead they come across Magnus who freezes Sebastian and informs Clary that Ragnor has been murdered. He tells her that the cure she needs in order to wake up her mother is located inside the Book of the White which was hidden by her mother inside the Wayland manor. With this, Clary travels on her way back. On route, Sebastian kisses Clary. However, she feels a sense of unease. When Clary returns she informs Jace that they need the Book of White and they set off on a journey to find it. Clary draws a portal to the Wayland Manor where they retrieve the book. They discover a secret passageway which leads them to a trapped angel who reveals that Clary received angel blood in the womb while Jace received demon blood. They give a seraph blade to the angel, who then stabs himself. Both of them escape the manor right before it collapses, as it was tied to the life force of the angel. Jace and Clary confess their love for each other and they share a kiss. However, Clary pulls back as she is not sure that Jace's feelings for her are not just a result of the demon and angel blood in their respective bodies.

On their way back, they find out that Alicante is being attacked by demons. In the battle, the youngest of the Lightwood family, Max, is killed by Sebastian. Clary and Jace rescue Simon from the fire in prison and realize that his fellow prison mate was Hodge. Sebastian appears and kills Hodge, after he reveals that Lake Lyn is the third mortal instrument.

After a few days, they have a funeral for the people who died in the attack. Simon meets up with Isabelle to comfort her as Jace walks Clary back to Amatis's place. That night, Jace comes to Clary's place and sleeps in her bed with her and in the morning leaves a note. When Clary gets downstairs to save Jace from his mistake, she reunites with her mother, Jocelyn, and reacts to this with anger. Clary runs to the Accords Hall to persuade the Clave not to surrender to Valentine. She introduces a new rune, called Alliance, which allows Shadowhunters and Downworlders to share each others powers. During the decision process, Jocelyn informs Clary that Jace isn't actually her biological brother but, rather, Sebastian is. In the end, the Clave decides that they will not surrender and that they will use Clary's rune to fight against her father. All Downworlders agree to this except for the vampires led by Raphael. He says the vampires will only fight if Clary hands over Simon to kill him. Clary comes up with a plan and draws a rune on Simon's forehead called the Mark of Cain. This protects Simon as anyone who tries to attack him will die and, as a result, Raphael cannot kill him. Meanwhile, Jace fights Sebastian and is about to die when Isabelle rescues him. Together, they kill Sebastian. Jace tracks down Valentine at Lake Lyn, where he is about to raise the Angel Raziel. He also finds Clary who portaled there but was bound by Valentine. Valentine kills Jace, and uses his blood for the summoning. However, right before Valentine finishes the ritual, Clary erases the runes in the sand that symbolize his name and writes hers over them. The angel rises, but as Valentine is no longer the one who summons him, the Angel kills him and grants Clary's wish to bring Jace back. Jocelyn and Luke confess their love for each other while Clary and Jace relish in their newfound happiness.

== Characters ==
=== Shadowhunters ===
- Clarissa Adele "Clary" Fray: A young Shadowhunter who discovered her heritage and special abilities at a later age. Clary is now trying to take down her father, Valentine, who wants to destroy the Shadowhunters and Downworlders.
- Jonathan "Jace" Wayland: A Shadowhunter struggling with his identity after he discovered that his father, who he thought was dead, is actually his enemy Valentine.
- Alexander "Alec" Lightwood: A Shadowhunter in a homosexual relationship with the warlock Magnus Bane. Their relationship challenges traditional norms in Shadowhunter society, leading to conflict within Alec's family who struggles to accept his choices.
- Isabelle "Izzy" Lightwood: Alec's sister who supports his relationship. She also helps Clary and Jace in the fight against Valentine.
- Valentine Morgenstern: A Shadowhunter who aims to destroy both Shadowhunters and Downworlders with the aid of the Mortal Instruments.
- Jocelyn Fray: Clary's mother who hid her heritage to protect her.
- Maryse Lightwood: Alec and Isabelle's mother who leads the New York Institute with her husband.
- Robert Lightwood: Alec and Isabelle's father who leads the New York Institute with his wife.
- Max Lightwood: The youngest child of the Lightwood family.
- Sebastian Verlac: A mysterious individual who meets Clary and the Lightwood family in Alicante.
- Aline Penhallow: A friend of the Lightwoods and the cousin of Sebastian Verlac.
- Amatis Herondale: Luke's sister who lives in isolation in Idris.
- Inquisitor Aldertree: The new Inquisitor who is willing to lie and manipulate the truth to close a case.
- Madeleine Bellefleur: Jocelyn's friend, who claims to be able to awaken Jocelyn from her coma.

=== Downworlders ===
- Simon Lewis - Clary's best friend who was turned into a vampire.
- Magnus Bane - The High Warlock of Brooklyn, who reluctantly agrees to assist the Conclave to save Alec.
- Luke Garroway - Jocelyn and Clary's friend, he is a werewolf and a former Shadowhunter.
- Maia Roberts - A member of Luke's werewolf pack in New York.
- Raphael Santiago - The leader of the vampireclan of New York.
- Seelie Queen - The queen of the Seelie Court and of the Fair Folk.
- Meliorn - The queen's personal knight and confidante.

=== Angels ===
- Raziel - The patron Angel of the Nephilim.
- Ithuriel - An angel imprisoned by Valentine, who used his blood for his experiments.
