= City of Heavenly Fire =

2014 fantasy novel by Cassandra Clare

- Author: Cassandra Clare
- Cover artist: Cliff Nielsen
- Language: English
- Series: The Mortal Instruments
- Genre: Fantasy, adventure
- Publisher: Margaret K. McElderry
- Publication date: May 27, 2014
- Publication place: United States
- Media type: Print (hardback & paperback)
- Pages: 725 (hardback, first edition), 725 (paperback)
- ISBN: 978-1442416895
- Preceded by: City of Lost Souls

City of Heavenly Fire is a young adult fantasy romance novel, the sixth and final installment in The Mortal Instruments series, and chronologically the twelfth installment in The Shadowhunter Chronicles franchise by Cassandra Clare. It was released on May 27, 2014. The book once again follows the adventures of the teenage Shadowhunter, Clary Fray, and her allies in facing her brother Sebastian Morgenstern and his allies of Endarkened Shadowhunters. It also ties in with both The Infernal Devices and The Dark Artifices series by having their main protagonists, Tessa Gray and Emma Carstairs, appear as supporting characters and connecting the worlds of The Infernal Devices and The Dark Artifices.

== Plot ==
Shadowhunters of the Los Angeles Institute meet to discuss the army of Endarkened Shadowhunters when the army, led by Sebastian Morgenstern, ambush the Institute, endarken some shadowhunters, and kidnap Mark Blackthorn, leaving Mark's five half-siblings and Emma Carstairs to escape to Alicante.

Maryse Lightwood announces to the New York Institute that an emergency meeting is due in Alicante to discuss the attack on five Institutes around the world. Clary Fray reluctantly leaves Simon Lewis to be guarded by Maia Roberts and Jordan Kyle for his safety. Simon is kidnapped by Maureen Brown and her vampire aides to be her groom, but Raphael Santiago frees and helps him to come to Alicante. Praetor Lupus, the brotherhood of werewolves, is soon attacked by the Endarkened with Jordan and Praetor Scott among the casualties, resulting in Bat Velasquez and Rufus Hastings battling for the position of pack leader. Rufus is about to deliver the death blow to Bat when Maia Roberts steps in and challenges Rufus. The vacuum of power is finally ended when Maia kills Rufus, becoming the new leader, and also tricks Maureen into drinking holy water so the latter's aide, Lily, can usurp her to become the leader of the vampire clan.

At Alicante, Emma and Julian Blackthorn are interrogated using the Mortal Sword, Clary comforting the former when she breaks into tears. Choosing to accept her Morgenstern heritage, Clary claims Heosphoros, the twin of Sebastian's Phaesphoros, as her sword. The Seelie Queen, now allied with Sebastian, sends Meliorn to ask the Downworlder Representatives (Jocelyn Fray, Luke Garroway, Magnus Bane, and Raphael) to join them; when they refuse, he brings them to Edom, the realm of demons. Jace Herondale is injured during the ensuing conflict and burns Brother Zachariah back into his Shadowhunter persona. An Endarkened soon gives an ultimatum for the Clave to hand over Clary and Jace. Clary, Jace, Simon, and Isabelle and Alec Lightwood, force the Seelie Queen to send them to Edom, where Clary transfers Jace's heavenly fire into Heosphoros. Confronting Sebastian, Clary pretends to agree to rule by his side but then stabs him with Heosphoros, reverting him back momentarily to the brother she could've had, Jonathan Morgenstern, who destroys the Infernal Cup before he dies, killing the Endarkened, including Luke's sister, Amatis. To escape Edom, Magnus summons his father, Asmodeus, who offers a way out in exchange for Magnus' immortality and life. Simon offers a lighter option: his immortality and memories of the Shadow World. The Clave punishes the faeries and sends Emma to live with the Blackthorns. Alec and Magnus reconcile and get back together. Meanwhile, Clary scatters Jonathan's ashes in Lake Lyn and mourns for Simon.

Several months later, Jocelyn and Luke hold their wedding, attended by numerous Shadowhunters and Downworlders alike. Simon has remembered bits of the Shadow World as well as his relationship with Isabelle. Attending the wedding is also Tessa Gray and Brother Zachariah (whose identity is not revealed), both of them having formally introduced themselves to Clary.

== Characters ==
- Clary Fairchild – A teenage Shadowhunter who possesses more angel blood than a normal Shadowhunter. Her unique circumstances provide her with the ability to cast extremely powerful runes and even create new runes that don't exist.
- Jace Herondale – A Shadowhunter experimented upon with angel blood like his girlfriend, Clary. He was formerly controlled by a rune that bound him to Sebastian Morgenstern and is currently infused with heavenly fire during Clary's attempt to purify him, which ignites whenever he is excited or in pain.
- Simon Lewis – Clary's formerly mundane best friend who was turned into a Daylighter; a vampire capable of walking in daylight. He is dating Isabelle Lightwood but is also targeted by his crazed fan-turned-vampire, Maureen Brown.
- Isabelle Lightwood – Clary's friend and fellow Shadowhunter, formerly the middle child of the Lightwood siblings up until her little brother's death, which she blames herself for. She is dating Simon Lewis.
- Alec Lightwood – Isabelle's older brother and Jace's parabatai. Throughout most of the book, he is heartbroken over Magnus Bane, his boyfriend, who broke up with him in the previous book, City of Lost Souls.
- Sebastian Morgenstern – The book's main antagonist, the leader of the Endarkened Shadowhunters, and Clary's older brother. The book reveals that there is still bits of good left in him: the real Jonathan Morgenstern, whom Clary meets as part of the illusion of Edom, though it is not enough to guarantee his life.
- Magnus Bane – A 400-year-old warlock born to a Greater Demon, Asmodeus, and a Dutch-Indonesian mother. His long experience makes him a useful ally for the Shadowhunters when they need his help for information or runes. He broke up with Alec Lightwood in the previous book, but slowly reconciles with him when he realizes that both are suffering without each other.
- Maia Roberts – A werewolf who formerly dated Simon Lewis before she reconciled back with her ex-boyfriend, Jordan Kyle. After Jordan and Praetor Scott's death, she becomes concerned in the battle between Bat Velasquez and Rufus Hastings, both fighting for leadership in the pack.
- Jocelyn Fray – Clary and Sebastian's mother who was infused with angel and demon blood by her first husband, the late Valentine Morgenstern. She is engaged to her childhood friend, Luke Garroway, though their wedding is postponed due to the Dark War.
- Luke Garroway – A werewolf and a former parabatai to Valentine Morgenstern, the main antagonist of the series' first three books. Clary has been seeing him as the only father figure she has had in her entire life. He is also the werewolf representative in the Council of the Downworlder Representatives. Luke is engaged to Jocelyn Fray.
- Raphael Santiago – A vampire and reluctant aide to the current leader of the New York vampire clan, Maureen Brown. He is also the vampire representative in the Council of the Downworlder Representatives.
- Maureen Brown – The current leader of New York vampire clan after killing its former leader, Camille Belcourt, and is Simon Lewis's crazed fangirl. She plans to become Simon's bride.
- Jordan Kyle – An active member of Praetor Lupus and the boyfriend of Maia Roberts. He is killed early in the novel when Sebastian and his army attack the Praetor Lupus headquarters, leaving hundreds of werewolves dead.
- Emma Carstairs – A 12-year-old Shadowhunter orphaned during the Dark War after her parents were found dead in ashore, which the Clave attributes to being Sebastian's doings. She is a close associate to the Blackthorn family, particularly to her parabatai, Julian Blackthorn.

== Reception ==
City of Heavenly Fire generally received mixed to positive reviews. Common Sense Media called the book 'an exciting send-off' giving the book a rating of 4/5, stating that "This YA fantasy is too long—but amid far too much of the characters' internal dialogue and remembrances of the good and bad times of the past five books, it's got a satisfying end for fans."

Booklist gave a positive review stating “sure to leave the faithful hooked yet again.” Entertainment Weekly gave a positive review that “few things in life more satisfying than a long-awaited happy ending, which is exactly what Clare delivers.”

Kirkus gave the book a mixed review, stating that "the myriad magical, societal and romantic story threads of two series and nine books conclude without living up to the series’ purple promise," with the School Library Journal also stating that “fans of the series will likely be satisfied with the conclusion.”

The Guardian called the book 'a perfect ending' stating that, “I don’t know what else to say other than the book is a perfect ending to the series… one of those books that you hold in your heart long after finishing.”

Goodreads users voted the book Best Young Adult Fantasy & Science Fiction of 2014 in the Goodreads Choice Awards.
