= City of Lost Souls (novel) =

2012 fantasy novel by Cassandra Clare

- Author: Cassandra Clare
- Cover artist: Cliff Nielsen
- Language: English
- Series: The Mortal Instruments
- Genre: Fantasy, adventure
- Publisher: Margaret K. McElderry
- Publication date: May 8, 2012
- Publication place: United States
- Media type: Print (hardback & paperback)
- Pages: 534 (hardback, first edition)
- ISBN: 978-1442416864
- Preceded by: City of Fallen Angels
- Followed by: City of Heavenly Fire

City of Lost Souls is the fifth book in The Mortal Instruments series by Cassandra Clare. City of Lost Souls was released on May 8, 2012, and was followed by the sixth and final book in the series, City of Heavenly Fire in 2014.

== Plot ==
Simon returns home and finds out that there are a lot of symbols (e.g., religious symbols) that form a barrier so he cannot enter the house, as he is a vampire. He speaks to his mother, only to feel more rejected when she accuses him of killing the "real" Simon. Things become more tense when he learns from Clary that Jace is currently missing and untraceable. Clary and the rest of the group manages to gain the assistance of the Seelie Queen, but in return they have to obtain and hand over two Faerie rings that would allow the wearers to communicate telepathically. Desperate, Clary agrees to the terms and while searching for the rings in a Shadowhunter library, accidentally observes Jace enter the library and speak in friendly terms with Sebastian (Who is actually "Jonathan Morgenstern", Valentine's half-demon blooded son) - which confuses Clary, who had been hiding during the conversation.

That night Clary wakes to find Jace lying in bed with her, asking her to come with him. Shortly after this, Sebastian enters the room- something that is discovered by Jocelyn, who screams and alerts others to their presence. After stabbing Luke in the back the two leave, but promise to return for Clary. She eventually decides to join the two men as a spy while using the Faerie rings (which she had secured from the Institute, but lied and pretended she was too distracted to secure them so that she would not have to hand them over to the Seelie Queen) to communicate with Simon. During this time Clary realizes that Jace has been possessed by Sebastian, as he acts more like Sebastian than himself. Meanwhile, Jordan Kyle and Maia Roberts, and separately Simon and Isabelle, are growing closer. Magnus and Alec, on the other hand, are facing tension as Alec secretly considers ways that they can grow old together (i.e., by stripping Magnus of his immortality).

Jace manages to temporarily shake off the possession and explain that Sebastian is planning to use Lilith's blood to create an army of dark Shadowhunters using the second Mortal Cup and will turn himself into the Clave, as he would rather die than continue to be possessed. He was only able to regain control due to the rune controlling him having received damage, which would also cause him to eventually die. Not wanting Jace's death, Clary calls Sebastian in and asks him to heal the rune, putting Jace back under Sebastian's control. Meanwhile, Simon and the others summon Raziel, who gives Simon a blade of Heaven named Glorious but at the cost of Simon's Mark of Cain.

Clary is later shown to be searching Sebastian's room, where she discovers her Faerie ring. She manages to alert Simon of most of Sebastian's plan and tells him to come to the Seventh Sacred Site, but is caught midway through by Sebastian and is forced to destroy the Faerie ring. The two then fight and Sebastian unsuccessfully tries to rape Clary, who manages to escape. She ends up going to the Seventh Site, where Simon gives Clary Raziel's sword, which she uses to hunt Sebastian. Unable to reach Sebastian, Clary uses the Angel blade and stabs Jace, believing that it will not kill him as his heart is more good than evil. Jace is set alight, leading the others to believe that he is dead.

Sebastian flees the battle, most of his dark Shadowhunters dead. Jace is discovered to be alive and is taken back to the Institute for healing. When she's finally allowed to visit Jace, she learns that stabbing him with Glorious has filled him with "Heavenly fire", which will burn anything he touches whenever he gets an adrenaline rush. Maryse receives a mishappen bag when she is with some of the silent brothers in her office which contained a pair of angel wings which were quite possibly ripped off a living angel along with a note saying "I am coming". Magnus ends up breaking up with Alec due to Camille's offer to strip Magnus of his immortality, as Alec had truly considered accepting the offer despite him ultimately refusing. Upset, Alec sets out to kill Camille but discovers Maureen, who tells him that she has killed Camille in order to gain leadership over her vampire clan by vampire law.

== Reception ==
Critical reception has been mixed. Kirkus Reviews wrote a mixed review for City of Lost Souls, writing that the sections focusing on Clary's POV "[focus] on her wardrobe instead of her character development" while also stating that "Fans of the familiar will find this an unchallenging goth-and-glitter pleasure." The Manila Bulletin was more positive and remarked that the book was much improved over the previous entry (City of Fallen Angels) but still felt that "at its core the book's plot is once again a retread of the first three books in "The Mortal Instruments" - the only difference is that the supernatural elements have been inverted." The Horn Book Guide wrote a brief review for City of Lost Souls, writing "More a series of incidents than a full-fledged story, the book's main pleasure is in following the continuing adventures of these familiar characters."
