= Carstairs (surname) =

Carstairs is a surname. Notable people with the surname include:

- Henrietta Carstairs (1777/78 – after 1817), British mountaineer and nanny
- Carroll Carstairs (1888–1948), American art dealer
- George Carstairs (rugby league) (1900–1966), Australian rugby league player
- Joe Carstairs (1900–1993), British power boat racer
- John Paddy Carstairs (1910–1970), British film and television director
- Steven Carstairs (1910–1998), Scottish radiologist
- Morris Carstairs (1916–1991), British psychiatrist and anthropologist
- Alan Carstairs (born 1939), Australian politician
- Sharon Carstairs (born 1942), Canadian politician
- Jim Carstairs (born 1971), Scottish footballer

Fictional characters:

- Lt. Fairfax and Lt. Carstairs, from the BBC sitcom 'Allo 'Allo!
- James "Jem" Carstairs, from The Infernal Devices series by Cassandra Clare

== See also ==
- William Carstares (1649–1715), minister of the Church of Scotland
