= The Shadowhunter Chronicles =

Media franchise by Cassandra Clare

- The Mortal Instruments; City of Bones; City of Ashes; City of Glass; City of Fallen Angels; City of Lost Souls; City of Heavenly Fire; The Infernal Devices; Clockwork Angel; Clockwork Prince; Clockwork Princess; The Dark Artifices; Lady Midnight; Lord of Shadows; Queen of Air and Darkness; The Last Hours; Chain of Gold; Chain of Iron; Chain of Thorns; The Eldest Curses; The Red Scrolls of Magic; The Lost Book of White; The Black Volume of the Dead (upcoming); The Wicked Powers; The Last King of Faerie; The Last Prince of Hell (upcoming); The Last Shadowhunter (upcoming); Companion books; Shadowhunters and Downworlders; The Shadowhunter's Codex; The Bane Chronicles; A History of Notable Shadowhunters & Denizens of Downworld; Tales From the Shadowhunter Academy; Ghosts of the Shadow Market; Better in Black
- Author: Cassandra Clare
- Country: United States
- Language: English
- Genre: Young adult
- Publisher: Margaret K. McElderry
- Published: March 27, 2007 – present
- Media type: Print (hardback, paperback); Audiobook; E-book
- No. of books: Novels; 18 released, 3 upcoming; Companion; 7 released

The Shadowhunter Chronicles is a media franchise based on the writings of American young adult fiction writer Cassandra Clare, which currently encompasses six series of novels, three short-story collections, five graphic novels, one film, a television series, and other media.

These works are set in a universe where fairy tales and mythologies, both pagan and Judeo-Christian, exist with its figures existing alongside the mundanes (normal humans). A race of humans who possess angel blood, the Nephilim or Shadowhunters, is organized to patrol the Shadow World and prevent demons as well as Downworlders, including warlocks, faeries, werewolves, and vampires, from attacking the mundanes. There is an uneasy peace, a treaty known as The Accords, between the governing body of the Nephilim, known as the Clave, and the Downworlders, not all of whom want peace or respect the Clave's authority.

== Novels ==
The following books are arranged in order of their respective timelines.

=== The Infernal Devices ===
The Infernal Devices is the second set of books published. Beginning in 1878, in London, the trilogy follows Tessa Gray, an American teenaged girl who arrives in England following her brother's invitation to move in together. But she is quickly thrust into the Shadow World when she is kidnapped by two warlocks known as the Dark Sisters, who claimed Tessa for her ability to change her appearance, a power even she had not yet known she had possessed. Upon learning that she is at the center of an evil plot raised by someone known only as "the Magister," Tessa begins to work with the Shadowhunters of London to discover the truth of her past, and in so doing meet the two great loves of her life: Will Herondale and Jem Carstairs.

1. Clockwork Angel (August 31, 2010)
2. Clockwork Prince (December 6, 2011)
3. Clockwork Princess (March 19, 2013)

=== The Last Hours ===
The Last Hours is the fifth set of books to be published. The sequel to The Infernal Devices series, it is set in 1903 London and Paris and revolves around Tessa Gray's children, James and Lucie, as well as their family friend, Cordelia Carstairs, as they navigate through the politics of the London Enclave and personal development issues.

1. Chain of Gold (March 3, 2020)
2. Chain of Iron (March 2, 2021)
3. Chain of Thorns (January 31, 2023)

=== The Mortal Instruments ===
The Mortal Instruments is the first set of books published. The series is mainly set in the year 2007 and revolves around Clary Fairchild, a fifteen-year-old who witnesses a murder invisible to everyone but herself, committed by a group of tattooed teenagers known as Shadowhunters. This event coincides with her mother's mysterious disappearance and exposes her to a hidden world previously kept from her by her mother. As Clary discovers her own supernatural abilities, she learns of her role among the Nephilim, human-angel hybrids tasked with protecting humanity from demons.

The story unfolds in a mystical version of New York City populated by "Downworlders" various supernatural entities including vampires, werewolves, and warlocks, who often find themselves in opposition to the Nephilim. Clary allies with Shadowhunters Jace Wayland, Isabelle Lightwood, Alec Lightwood, and the warlock Magnus Bane. Together, they face the conflicts initiated by Valentine Morgenstern and his son, Jonathan Morgenstern, which threatens the peace between humans and Downworlders.

1. City of Bones (March 27, 2007)
2. City of Ashes (March 25, 2008)
3. City of Glass (March 23, 2009)
4. City of Fallen Angels (April 5, 2011)
5. City of Lost Souls (May 8, 2012)
6. City of Heavenly Fire (May 27, 2014)

=== The Eldest Curses ===
The Eldest Curses is the fourth set of books to be published. The trilogy tells the story of Magnus Bane and Alec Lightwood's adventures together and explore their relationship. Each book is set at different points in the franchise's timeline: the first is set during the events of The Mortal Instruments; the second is set between the events of The Mortal Instruments and The Dark Artifices; and the last will be set after The Dark Artifices. The books were jointly written by Cassandra Clare and Wesley Chu.

1. The Red Scrolls of Magic (April 9, 2019)
2. The Lost Book of the White (September 1, 2020)
3. The Black Volume of the Dead (TBA)

=== The Dark Artifices ===
The Dark Artifices is the third set of books published. The sequel to The Mortal Instruments series, it takes place in 2012, five years after the events of that series's final book, City of Heavenly Fire. It revolves around the Shadowhunter Emma Carstairs, first introduced in City of Heavenly Fire, as she seeks the answer for her parents' mysterious deaths. The story mainly circulates on the romantic tension between Emma and her parabatai (bound fighting partner and best friend), Julian Blackthorn.

1. Lady Midnight (March 8, 2016)
2. Lord of Shadows (May 23, 2017)
3. Queen of Air and Darkness (December 4, 2018)

=== The Wicked Powers ===
The Wicked Powers will be the sixth and final set of books to be published and serve as the conclusion of The Shadowhunter Chronicles. The series will serve as sequel to The Dark Artifices. It will be based in 2016, four years after the events of the final book of The Dark Artifices - Queen of Air and Darkness - and will center around the characters of Kit Herondale, Ty Blackthorn and Dru Blackthorn.

1. The Last King of Faerie (Nov 3, 2026)
2. The Last Prince of Hell (TBA)
3. The Last Shadowhunter (TBA)

== Companion books ==
The following books are listed in order of their publication dates.

- Shadowhunters and Downworlders is a collection of young adult authors writing about the series and its world. It was released on January 29, 2013.
- The Shadowhunter's Codex is a companion book to The Shadowhunter Chronicles series released on October 29, 2013. It explains the terminology and the lore of the series as well as other extras and special features.
- The Bane Chronicles is an anthology book consisting of eleven novellas revolving around the character Magnus Bane. Ten of the novellas were previously released online in a period of a year and were jointly written by Cassandra Clare and other young-adult writers. It was released on November 11, 2014.
  - "What Really Happened in Peru" (with Sarah Rees Brennan)
  - "The Runaway Queen" (with Maureen Johnson)
  - "Vampires, Scones, and Edmund Herondale" (with Brennan)
  - "The Midnight Heir" (with Brennan)
  - "The Rise of the Hotel Dumort" (with Johnson)
  - "Saving Raphael Santiago" (with Brennan)
  - "The Fall of the Hotel Dumort" (with Johnson)
  - "What to Buy the Shadowhunter Who Has Everything" (with Brennan)
  - "The Last Stand of the New York Institute" (with Brennan and Johnson)
  - "The Course of True Love (And First Dates)"
- A History of Notable Shadowhunters & Denizens of Downworld: Told in the Language of Flowers is a collection of artwork by Cassandra Jean, who created The Shadowhunter Tarot Cards. Inspired by the Victorian language of flowers, the book features brand-new illustrations, details, and notes about characters from The Mortal Instruments, The Infernal Devices, The Dark Artifices, Tales from the Shadowhunter Academy, and The Last Hours. It was released on February 18, 2016.
- Tales From the Shadowhunter Academy is an anthology book that, like The Bane Chronicles, consists of ten novellas released online in a period of nine months revolving around Simon Lewis, first introduced in The Mortal Instruments as Clary Fairchild's best friend, as he gets the chance to become a Shadowhunter. The anthology was released on November 15, 2016.
  - "Welcome to Shadowhunter Academy" (with Sarah Rees Brennan)
  - "The Lost Herondale" (with Robin Wasserman)
  - "The Whitechapel Fiend" (with Maureen Johnson)
  - "Nothing but Shadows" (with Brennan)
  - "The Evil We Love" (with Wasserman)
  - "Pale Kings and Princes" (with Wasserman)
  - "Bitter of Tongue" (with Brennan)
  - "The Fiery Trial" (with Johnson)
  - "Born to Endless Night" (with Brennan)
  - "Angels Twice Descending" (with Wasserman)
- Ghosts of the Shadow Market is a collection of ten novellas, and much like The Bane Chronicles and Tales from the Shadowhunter Academy, it follows the adventures of Jem Carstairs. The first eight were published monthly in e-book format between April and November 2018, and the last two were published exclusively in the print edition that was released on June 4, 2019.
  - "Son of the Dawn" (with Sarah Rees Brennan)
  - "Cast Long Shadows" (with Brennan)
  - "Every Exquisite Thing" (with Maureen Johnson)
  - "Learn About Loss" (with Kelly Link)
  - "A Deeper Love" (with Johnson)
  - "The Wicked Ones" (with Robin Wasserman)
  - "The Land I Lost" (with Brennan)
  - "Through Blood, Through Fire" (with Wasserman)
  - "The Lost World" (with Link)
  - "Forever Fallen" (with Brennan)
- Better in Black is a collection of ten short stories each featuring a different romantic relationship established in the main series, with the book having the subtitle 'Ten Stories of Shadowhunter Romance'. This collection was originally independently published by Clare as one of four items included in a crowdfunding project on Kickstarter in 2024. The hardback traditionally published version of the book, published the following year in 2025, also included a sneak peek chapter of The Last King of Faerie, the first book in the then upcoming final Shadowhunters trilogy The Wicked Powers. Unlike the previous short story/novella collections, Better in Black was written solely by Cassandra Clare. The stories included in this collection are:
  - The Good Storm
  - The Beautiful Ajatara
  - Who the Wolf Loves
  - Zachary's Day Out
  - The Judgement of King Kieran
  - A Surfeit of Annas
  - Bred in the Bone
  - City of Broken Hearts
  - The Time of Two
  - Too Wise to Love

== Adaptations ==
=== Film ===
In 2010, Screen Gems announced that they were going into production on the film adaptation of City of Bones, the first book in The Mortal Instruments series, with hopes of starting a successful film franchise. The film was originally due for release on August 23, 2013, but was pushed back two days earlier, on August 21, 2013. The film premiered on August 12, 2013, at the Cinerama Dome in Hollywood. Production on a film adaptation of the second book, City of Ashes, was due to start in September 2013, but was delayed to 2014, and eventually cancelled, after the first film failed to recoup its budget.

=== Television ===
On October 12, 2014, at Mipcom, Constantin confirmed that The Mortal Instruments will return as a television series with Ed Decter as showrunner. Constantin Film and TV head Martin Moszkowicz told The Hollywood Reporter that, "It actually makes sense to do [the novels] as a TV series. There was so much from the book that we had to leave out of the Mortal Instruments film. In the series we'll be able to go deeper and explore this world in greater detail and depth." The producers hope to adapt the entire book series if the TV adaptation proves successful. In February 2015, book series author Cassandra Clare announced via Twitter that the television series would be called Shadowhunters rather than The Mortal Instruments.

In March 2015, ABC Family picked up Shadowhunters straight-to-series, and premiered on January 12, 2016. The series was renewed for a second season in March 2016, comprising 20 episodes, which premiered on January 2, 2017. In April 2017, it was announced that the series was renewed for a third season of 20 episodes. The first half of ten episodes premiered on March 20, 2018. On June 4, 2018, Freeform canceled the series after three seasons, but ordered two extra episodes to properly conclude the series' story; the second half of the third season premiered on February 25, 2019.
