= Chain of Gold =

2020 novel by Cassandra Clare

Chain of Gold (The Last Hours #1)
- First edition cover
- Author: Cassandra Clare
- Cover artist: Cliff Nielsen
- Language: English
- Series: The Last Hours
- Subject: Fantasy
- Genre: Fantasy
- Publisher: Margaret K. McElderry Books
- Publication date: March 3, 2020
- Publication place: United States
- English publication date: March 3, 2020
- Media type: Hardcover, Paperback, Ebook
- Pages: 582
- ISBN: 1481431870
- Preceded by: Clockwork Princess
- Followed by: Chain of Iron

Chain of Gold is a young adult-urban fantasy-novel by Cassandra Clare. It is the first book in The Last Hours, which is chronologically second in The Shadowhunter Chronicles. The book follows the events that occur in the London area in 1903, focusing on the residents of the London Institute. The chapter titles, like in The Infernal Devices, are all taken from poetry of the Victorian and Edwardian era that the characters would be familiar with, and the book title was taken from the Charles Dickens novel Great Expectations.

== Plot ==
The book takes place during the 1900s. However, several flashbacks (known as "Days Past") are scattered between the official chapters.

=== Part one ===
In 1897, in Idris, ten-year-old Lucie Herondale, daughter of Shadowhunter William "Will" Herondale, and half warlock/half Shadowhunter Theresa "Tessa" Gray, gets lost in the forest. She finds her way back with the help of a mysterious young boy.

Six years later, in 1903, James Herondale and his friends, his parabatai Matthew Fairchild (son of Charlotte Fairchild), Thomas Lightwood, and Christopher Lightwood, defeat the first demon they have seen in a year. The demon recognizes James, who falls into the shadow realm (a unique power as a result of his warlock heritage) for the first time in 3 years.

Meanwhile, Cordelia Carstairs enters the London society along with her brother Alastair and mother Sona. Her father has been arrested for supposedly mishandling a vampire raid, and the Carstairs wish to make powerful allies in London to save their reputation. The Carstairs are greeted by Tessa, James (Cordelia's childhood friend who she has a crush on), and Lucie (James' sister). Cordelia believes that her feelings for James might be requited.

At the next day's ball, James requests Cordelia dance with him, but disappoints her when he suddenly leaves to greet Grace Blackthorn, the adopted ward of Tatiana Blackthorn. James met Grace in 1899, and has been in love with her since he was 13 years old. Lucie sees the mysterious boy from her childhood, who reveals himself to be the ghost of Jesse Blackthorn, the late son of Tatiana. His mother asked Downworlders to preserve his body, so his spirit has remained trapped in the in-between. James is swept into the Shadow Realm and sees a partygoer being attacked seconds before she collapses in the real world.

The day after, Cordelia takes James aside and he reveals his relationship with Grace to her. Cordelia is heartbroken but happy for him. A demon attack wounds Ariadne Bridgestock and Barbara Lightwood, Thomas's oldest sister.

In a flashback, James meets Grace once again. She points out that he was in love with Cordelia, which he half-heartedly denied. Later on, Grace requested him to use his shadow abilities to retrieve her Cartwright familial bracelet which Tatiana seized.

A demon kept in Tatiana's greenhouse destroys it, and she blames James. Later, James reads a missive addressed to Matthew, signed by Grace. James immediately goes out alone.

Jesse visits Lucie in her bedroom and informs her that James is in danger, as Grace was being followed by the Blackthorn family demon and would probably murder anyone who wasn't a Blackthorn. She goes to save James. Cordelia, Matthew and Anna Lightwood (Christopher's older sister) visit Malcolm Fade and Hypatia Vex, where they inquire about the attacks and if the downworlders might have heard of it. Cordelia saves the warlocks' lives, and in return they send for Ragnor Fell who might be able to help Cordelia.

In a flashback to 1902, Thomas Lightwood had been gone for his travel year and stopped at Paris. He had met Alastair Carstairs there, and they had toured the whole city amiably. Around that time, Thomas had felt himself warming up to Alastair.

Back in the night, James meets with Grace as per her instructions and she asks James to forsake his Shadowhunter blood, run away, and marry her. It’s the only way she can escape her cruel mother. James silently considers it but decides there’s no way he can forsake his family, friends, or parabatai. Grace is angry at his declaration, but she’s cut short when demons attack them. Lucie, Christopher, Matthew, Thomas, Cordelia and Alastair come to their aid. The strongest demon recognizes James and asks why James is fighting against the creatures who worship his own grandfather. The demon calls Tessa’s demon father a prince of hell, which is a fallen angel as powerful as Raziel. James is shocked at the revelation. He lets the remaining demons go in the name of his grandfather as long as they go back to their own dimension. They will do so as long as no one present tells any other Shadowhunters about what transpired at the waterfront. After they’re gone, Tatiana pulls up in her carriage searching for Grace. James begs Grace to come to the Institute with him. His father will grant her safe haven. Tatiana promises to produce evidence to ruin Grace's reputation if she doesn’t come home with her.

Ragnor visits the teenagers-sans Cordelia and Alastair, and gives them a lead - Emmanuel Gast, who he thought might be able to dredge up information. Shocking news arrives when Barbara Lightwood is pronounced dead. At the Carstairs manor in Cornwall Gardens, Charles visits late at night. Cordelia, afraid that her brother might tell him of James' grandfather, eavesdrops on her brother and Charles' conversation and finds out that Alastair and Charles are gay and Charles was marrying Ariadne for power only. He was scared of rejection by the society and hence couldn't publicly display his sexual orientation. The next morning, James visits Cordelia and they, along with Matthew and Lucie pay a visit to Emmanuel Gast. However, he is already dead. Lucie summons his ghost and learns that he had raised the demon who was wreaking havoc over London. He claimed that he knew her grandfather, but she banished him before he could reveal much. Later they find splinters of wood with strange inscriptions. The four head back to the institute. Charles arrives in a carriage, bringing Grace and a bloodied Tatiana to the Institute. Once Tatiana is being treated in their infirmary, Grace pulls James aside to talk to him.

James takes Grace aside where she informs him that she is now engaged to Charles - who had broken off his engagement with Ariadne whilst she was unconscious. Grace demands her bracelet back from him and when he returns it, he feels physical pain from the separation. He goes to the Blackfriars Bridge to relieve his heartache. Grace finds Matthew and tells him what has transpired. Before she leaves, she seemingly holds Matthew in place with words alone and kisses him. She threatens to tell James about this kiss if Matthew ever breathes a word of their conversation to anyone. Matthew later finds James sitting on the bridge and in a moment of recklessness James drinks from his flask, and loses consciousness due to exhaustion. The next morning when he wakes up, he finds the hurt gone, and feels oddly light. Cordelia meanwhile had accompanied Anna to the infirmary and seen her put her guard down and sob for Ariadne. Will and Tessa have gone with the Silent Brothers to transport Tatiana and the other remaining wounded Shadowhunters to the Silent City. Grace will be staying with the Bridgestocks near the City to be close to her mother. Cordelia receives a letter from Charlotte, answering her inquiries about her father. He’s actually already been questioned with the Mortal Sword, which Cordelia was sure would clear his name as it requires the holder to speak only truth. Unfortunately, the demon attack has been erased from his memory, so he cannot clear his name with the sword.

Christopher arrives with the results and the group discovers that the shards of wood were pieces of a Pyxis. James informs them that the inscription were written in Old Persian and they realize that the demon was in fact a Mandikhor demon, which can produce smaller demons. They form a plan to capture the demon but for that they would need a Pyxis. Cordelia recalls seeing one at Hypatia's salon and they decide to approach Anna for aid. James escorts Cordelia home and Sona presumes that they both were getting closer than before and James had marital intentions, to which Cordelia replies in the negative. Cordelia goes to Alastair to gently break the news of Charles’ new engagement to him. Alastair already knew and is not happy when Cordelia tells him she eavesdropped on his recent conversation with Charles.

=== Part two ===
The next evening, James, Cordelia and Matthew accompany Anna to Hell Ruelle, where Hypatia is hosting a party. Lucie, Christopher and Thomas spy on the Enclave meeting and find out that Oliver, Barbara's ex-fiancee had died as well, seemingly due to the fact that Barbara had scratched him before her death. This shocked the entire Enclave as demon poison had never been contagious before, and London is placed immediately under quarantine. In Hell Ruelle, Anna seduces Hypatia and Cordelia performs in front of the gathering. James and Matthew are impressed, however they notice Charles entering the club. Matthew pushes the couple away and they hide in The Whispering Room, where James and Cordelia kiss passionately.

The next morning the Merry Thieves, Lucie, and Cordelia take advantage of the fact that Will and Tessa are gone for day-patrols, an added precaution by the Clave, and empty the Pyxis by letting out a Palpis demon named Agliarept, so that they may use it to trap the Mandikhor. They kill the demon before he could sway them. Since they performed it in the Sanctuary, Magnus walks in on them inquiring about their actions. They explain to him, their plans of ridding the shadow world of the demon and Cordelia implores Magnus to help them by casting an illusion over Tower Bridge, to protect and distract the mundanes. Magnus agrees. While they are going towards Tower Bridge, Magnus disproves James' theory of his grandfather being Belphegor.

In 1900, at the home of the Carstairs in Idris, there was an argument between the Carstairs siblings regarding the possession of Cortana. Cordelia stated that she wanted to be a merciful hero and Alastair merely said that the sword belonged to him as he was the Carstairs heir. However, Cortana flew back into Cordelia's hand, "choosing its owner."

The group goes to Tower Bridge to try to fight and capture the demon, but it breaks free of the Pyxis. During their fight against the Mandikhor, Cordelia is knocked into the Thames, but Lucie summons all the ghosts of London to her aid and they pull Cordelia out of the waters. When the demon departs, it speaks to James and tries to convince him to go to Belial's realm. Christopher has figured out the cure but cannot make it work without an illegal ingredient. James locates where it may be found but before they could retrieve it, Christopher is attacked and poisoned himself. Cordelia's mother reveals that she's pregnant. While receiving treatment in the Silent City, James, Cordelia, and Matthew sneak in and talked with Christopher. Christopher, under the influence of the infection, grabs James's wrist, infecting him, while trying to warn him that he was in danger and all the attacks were about him.

Meanwhile, Thomas searches the Chiswick grounds for the root and Lucie wanders off to a shed, where she spies on Grace Blackthorn. She notices Jesse Blackthorn's body, in a glass coffin, where he appears to be asleep. She hears Grace talking about her mother hurting James when suddenly a demon attacks her. It scoffs at her for removing James' bracelet and reaches out to destroy Jesse's coffin when Lucie reveals herself and helps Grace fight. Jesse kills the demon, saving them. Lucie and Thomas Lightwood retrieve the plant to finish the antidote for the poison Christopher had developed. Thomas and Alastair create the elixir and go to the Silent City to distribute it, which is a huge success.

After fleeing the city, James realizes that the person behind the attacks had to be his demonic grandfather. He enters the shadow realm to confront and stop Belial once and for all. After some time, Cordelia uses Cortana to cut through the Portal to help him. Belial reveals that the Mandikhor demon was raised partially in the physical world and partially in his realm, making it immune to sunlight. They battle the Mandikhor, but are gravely outmatched until James used his connection to Belial's realm to summon a tornado and kill it. Belial then approaches James to proposition him once again, to which Cordelia ran him through with Cortana. With Belial being severely wounded, the realm collapses, and James and Cordelia return to their own realm. Having been poisoned and depleted his strength when reaching into the realm, James is dying when they returned. Matthew tries healing runes, but they are not strong enough to save him. Unbeknownst to him, the ghost of Jesse Blackthorn gave James his last breath — which had been preserved in his locket to one day resurrect himself — saving his life.

Days later, while still recovering from his ordeal, James is visited by Grace. Grace pleads for his understanding of her actions and then tells him of her mother's involvement in necromancy and her plans against Nephilim. She forces her bracelet back on his wrist and asks that he go to Blackthorn Manor to destroy an automaton there. With the bracelet's control strengthened, James agrees and in the process of destroying it, burns down the manor. At the following council meeting, Tatiana accuses James of having orchestrated the Mandikhor attacks and then burning her house down to destroy her evidence. In an effort to protect him, Cordelia provides him with an alibi, claiming he had been with her the night before, tarnishing her reputation. While Tatiana is being arrested and sent to the Adamant Citadel for the dark magic items found in the rubble of her home, James proposes to Cordelia in order to save her reputation, with the plan to divorce in a year, and Cordelia agrees.

At James and Cordelia's engagement party, Matthew drinks heavily in an attempt to drown his sorrows, realizing he is in love with Cordelia. Charles announces his engagement to Grace and later seeks out Alastair, who breaks up with him in a lone corridor with Cordelia there to support him. Because of his drunken state, Matthew reveals the rumors Alastair had spread about their parents to Thomas, in an effort to prevent their friendship, causing Thomas to threaten Alastair, who runs out of the room crying. Ariadne approaches Anna, telling her that she heard her when she spoke to her at the infirmary, making Ariadne realize that Anna still loved her. When Anna asserts her reputation of being a pessimist about love, Ariadne tells her that she will win her back. Grace emerges from the shadows and she and Lucie talk about resurrecting Jesse.

Magnus Bane finds Matthew feeling desolate, as he notices the younger boy looking towards James and Cordelia dancing merrily. It is then that he reveals his attraction towards Cordelia and hints about the false marriage. Magnus is intrigued and decides that he needed to stay in London for a little while longer. Cordelia reflects on how drastically her life had changed since her arrival in London. James talks to her and tells her that he wishes she could be happy. He also states that the events of the whispering room had been a pretense. Cordelia is saddened but resolves to spend this one year with James happily.

Meanwhile, in Chiswick manor, Tatiana, who is now being banished to the Adamant Citadel, visits her son's coffin. She finds Belial waiting for her, and he says that he will rise much earlier than the Nephilim assumed. He also states that since Tatiana was now in the Adamant Citadel, they will strike at the heart of the Shadowhunters - their Adamas. Saying this he vanishes again, leaving Tatiana satisfied.

== Characters ==
=== Shadowhunters ===
- Cordelia Carstairs — a Shadowhunter arriving in London trying to make powerful friends in order to save her family from disgrace. She is brave, loyal, selfless, and determined, and wields the mythical sword known as Cortana. She has been in love with James since the two were children. Unlike her older brother, Alastair, she is well-liked by the other characters. She has long dark red hair, black eyes, and light brown skin.
- James Herondale — Cordelia's childhood friend and crush, who is very popular and handsome. He is intelligent and introverted, and struggles with his demonic heritage on his mother's side. He has the ability to travel into the shadow realm, though he has difficulty controlling this ability. While he falls in love with Cordelia, he has been in love with Grace for several years due to the fact that she is manipulating his emotions with the help of a seemingly harmless bracelet he has worn for a while. He has pale skin, black hair, and gold eyes.
- Lucie Herondale — Cordelia's soon-to-be parabatai and James's younger sister. Lucie is a lively young girl who is very talkative, protective, and friendly. She is an aspiring writer and writes an ongoing novel known as "The Beautiful Cordelia", which she sends to Cordelia to read every month. She has the ability to see all kinds of ghosts and command them to do her bidding. She has pale skin, brown hair, and blue eyes.
- Matthew Fairchild — James's parabatai, who is cheerful, flirtatious, and sometimes considered scandalous by many of the London Shadowhunters. He is very fashionable and idolizes Oscar Wilde and Magnus Bane. While he is usually kind, he is often drunk and holds an extreme grudge against Alastair Carstairs. He also considers himself a murderer after indirectly causing his mother, Charlotte, to have a miscarriage; he keeps this secret from most people, even his family and friends. Matthew has dark gold hair and green eyes; he is also bisexual. He has complicated feelings for Cordelia.
- Thomas Lightwood — James's friend, a gentle young man who recently returned from his travel year in Spain. Thomas used to be small and sickly and was often considered meek, though this changed after he had a growth spurt. He is considered the "one with the kind heart" in his friend group, though he does enjoy teasing his friends. Thomas is very tall (at 6'5, he is the tallest of the characters) with broad shoulders, sandy brown hair, and hazel eyes. He also has complicated feelings for Alastair Carstairs.
- Christopher Lightwood — James's friend and Thomas's cousin, an absent-minded young man with the mind of an inventor. He gets distracted easily, though he is intelligent and well-meaning. He is fond of experimenting, though many of his experiments end up going awry. Christopher has dark brown hair and eyes described as the color of lilacs; he usually wears thick glasses.
- Alastair Carstairs — Cordelia's stern older brother, who was in a secret relationship with Charles Fairchild for the majority of the book. He is grumpy and arrogant but holds a soft spot for Thomas and cares for Cordelia. Due to his insecurity about his Persian heritage, he distanced himself from his culture and bullied others to avoid getting bullied himself, though he has regrets about this. He has naturally black hair that he dyes blond for most of the book, light brown skin, and black eyes. He is homosexual.
- Anna Lightwood — regarded as a bit of a bohemian, Anna is a quite popular with the ladies but disapproved of by the older generation for her lifestyle choices and for dressing like a man. She acts as an older sister to the others and often does her best to look out for and assist them. She is genderqueer, and dates women, though she does not like to commit after having her heart broken by Ariadne Bridgestock, her first love. Like Matthew, Anna is very stylish. She has black hair and blue eyes.
- Ariadne Bridgestock — the adopted daughter of the Inquisitor. She was engaged to Charles Fairchild, though he later breaks it off. Ariadne is secretly a lesbian and has a history with Anna. She is determined to win Anna back after initially losing her due to her engagement with Charles.
- Grace Blackthorn — the mysterious adopted daughter of Tatiana Blackthorn whom James is in love with. She seems meek and frail but is actually quite cold and calculating.
- Tatiana Blackthorn — a maddened woman who seeks revenge and to resurrect her dead son.
- The London Enclave — governing body of the local Shadowhunters, which consists of Will Herondale, Tessa Gray, Charles Fairchild, Henry Branwell, Gabriel Lightwood, Gideon Lightwood, Sophie Collins, and Cecily Herondale.
- Brother Zachariah — formerly known as James "Jem" Carstairs, a Silent Brother, and the former parabatai of Will Herondale, who acts as a kind of uncle to James, Lucie and the others. He is also a first cousin to Cordelia and Alastair.
- Barbara Lightwood — The eldest child of Gideon Lightwood and Sophie Collins. Growing up, Barbara had the perfect Sight, the ability to see past glamours. She has an understanding with Oliver Hayward, whose family runs the York Institute. Barbara was very affectionate and protective over Thomas—to the point where he found it smothering—and was often considered more gentle than her sister. She was somewhat of a romantic, and wanted to become a dutiful wife rather than a strong Shadowhunter. During a demon attack in Regents Park, Barbara was bitten and collapsed. In her final moments, she was delirious and lashed out, clawing at Oliver who had been crying by her bedside. This unknowingly spread the infection to Oliver who fell ill and died shortly after. Thomas and the others dedicated themselves to not only making a cure but finding and putting an end to the demon attacks in her name.
- Eugenia Lightwood — The second child of Gideon Lightwood and Sophie Collins. Like Barbara, Eugenia was very affectionate and protective over Thomas, to the point where he found it smothering, and wants to become a dutiful wife rather than a strong Shadowhunter. She is considered stubborn and rebellious. Eugenia was seemingly dubbed "ruined" as she had apparently been found alone with a gentleman whom did not later propose to her. She was in Idris, hiding from her shame when she heard the news that her sister Barbara had died of demon poison. She collapsed upon hearing it and her mother and father traveled via Portal to be with her while they grieved, though she returned to London after the quarantine had been lifted and attended an Enclave meeting in the London Institute with them to discuss the full of what had happened between the attacks that had killed Barbara and a few others.
- Charles Fairchild — an ambitious young man hoping to succeed his mother as Consul, and Matthew's older brother. He is self-conscious about his reputation and is in a secret relationship with Alastair Carstairs for most of the book.

=== Downworlders ===
- Hypatia Vex — a warlock who owns the Hell Ruelle.
- Malcolm Fade — High Warlock of London, succeeding Ragnor Fell.
- Magnus Bane — a powerful warlock, and old friend of Will Herondale's and Tessa Gray's.

=== Others ===
- Jessamine Lovelace — the ghost guardian of the London Institute. Also known as Jessamine Gray after her secret marriage to Tessa's brother Nate in The Infernal Devices.
- Jesse Blackthorn — Tatiana's deceased son and Grace Blackthorn's adoptive brother. His spirit can only be seen by his mother, Grace, and Lucie.
