= Rumelt =

Rumelt is a surname.

Notable people with the surname include:

- Richard Rumelt (born 1942), American author and consultant on competitive strategy
- Owen Rumelt, New York attorney selected for Super Lawyers, 2015 - 2016, 2019 - 2026
- Allison Rumelt, a clinical psychologist specializing in adolescents and young adults
- Russ Rumelt, Senior Financial Analyst at the Comptroller of the Currency
- Alexander Rumelt, a senior HR manager at Seifert Auto company in Poland
