= The Outcast Dead =

The Outcast Dead may refer to:

- Cross Bones, a former burial ground in London is said to house the "outcast dead".

== Fiction ==
- The Outcast Dead, a 2010 novel in the science fiction series The Horus Heresy by Graham McNeill and based in the world of Warhammer 40,000
- The Outcast Dead, a 2014 novel by Elly Griffiths
- The Outcast Dead, title of the prologue in the 2011 Cassandra Clare novel, Clockwork Prince
