= Monkenhurst =

Coordinates: 51°39′28.07″N 0°11′6.38″W

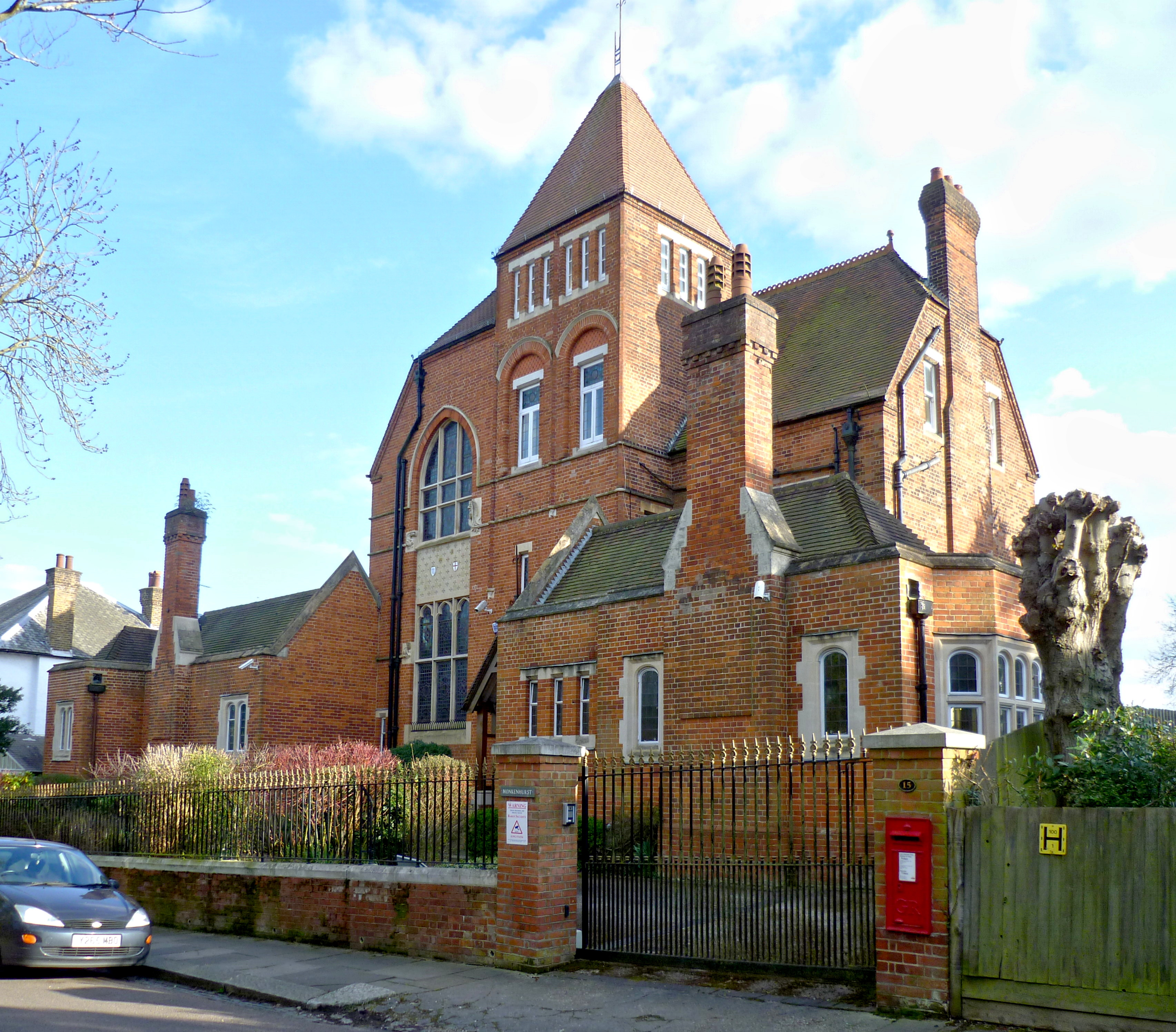
- Interactive map of the Monkenhurst area

Monkenhurst is a house in the Victorian Gothic style at 15 The Crescent on the north edge of New Barnet in London, England. It overlooks Monken Hadley Common. The house was built in 1880 to a design by Peter Dollar and was once the home of the comedian Spike Milligan.

== History ==
Monkenhurst was built in 1880 to a Victorian Gothic design by Peter Dollar and enlarged in 1915. It is of red brick with three storeys and a pyramid-capped tower. Stained glass windows, acquired from Northumberland House (demolished 1874), show the crests of participants in the Wars of the Roses in reference to the Battle of Barnet, a key battle in the conflict that took place nearby.

In the 1920s the house was the home of the mining engineer and metallurgist Savannah Johnson Speak (1868–1929) and in the 1950s it was the residence of the radiologist Steven Carstairs (1919–1998).

In 1973, the house along with other property totalling about two acres, was acquired by Highshore Properties, who, it was reported in Estates Gazette, intended to sell Monkenhurst and build houses and bungalows on the rest of the site.

In 1974 Monkenhurst was acquired by the comedian Spike Milligan who spent £10,000 restoring it. He also paid to have the pound (an historic livestock enclosure) on Monken Hadley Common repaired. Visitors to the house during Milligan's ownership included Prince Charles, and fellow Goon Show cast-member Peter Sellers, who arrived naked as a practical joke, and was sent away again still naked. The house was later purchased by the property developer Stephen Friel who spent £250,000 refurbishing it after acquiring it in a poor condition. It was offered for sale in 2002 for £1.75 million

Monkenhurst is locally listed by the London Borough of Barnet.

== Gallery ==
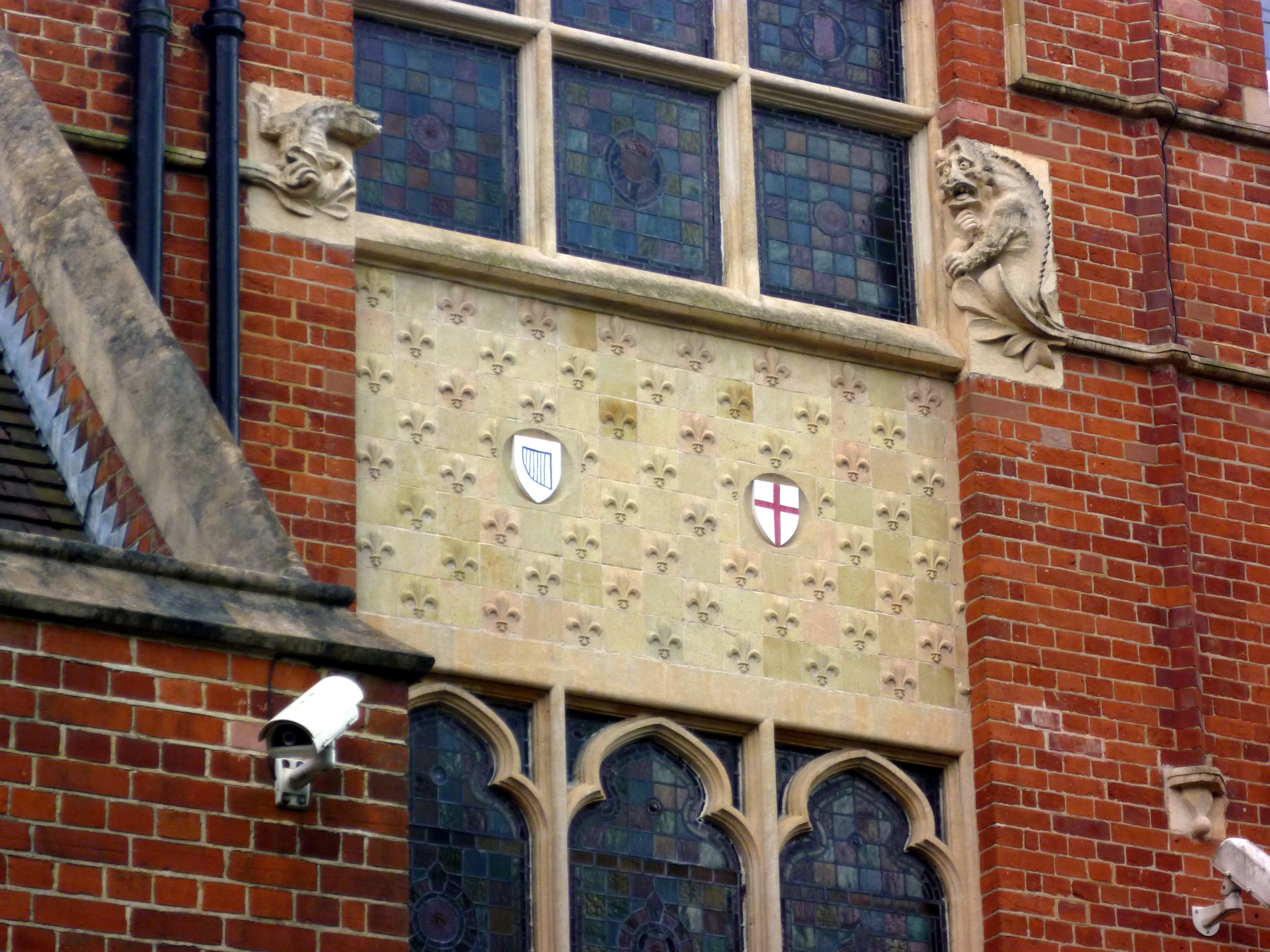
Window detail

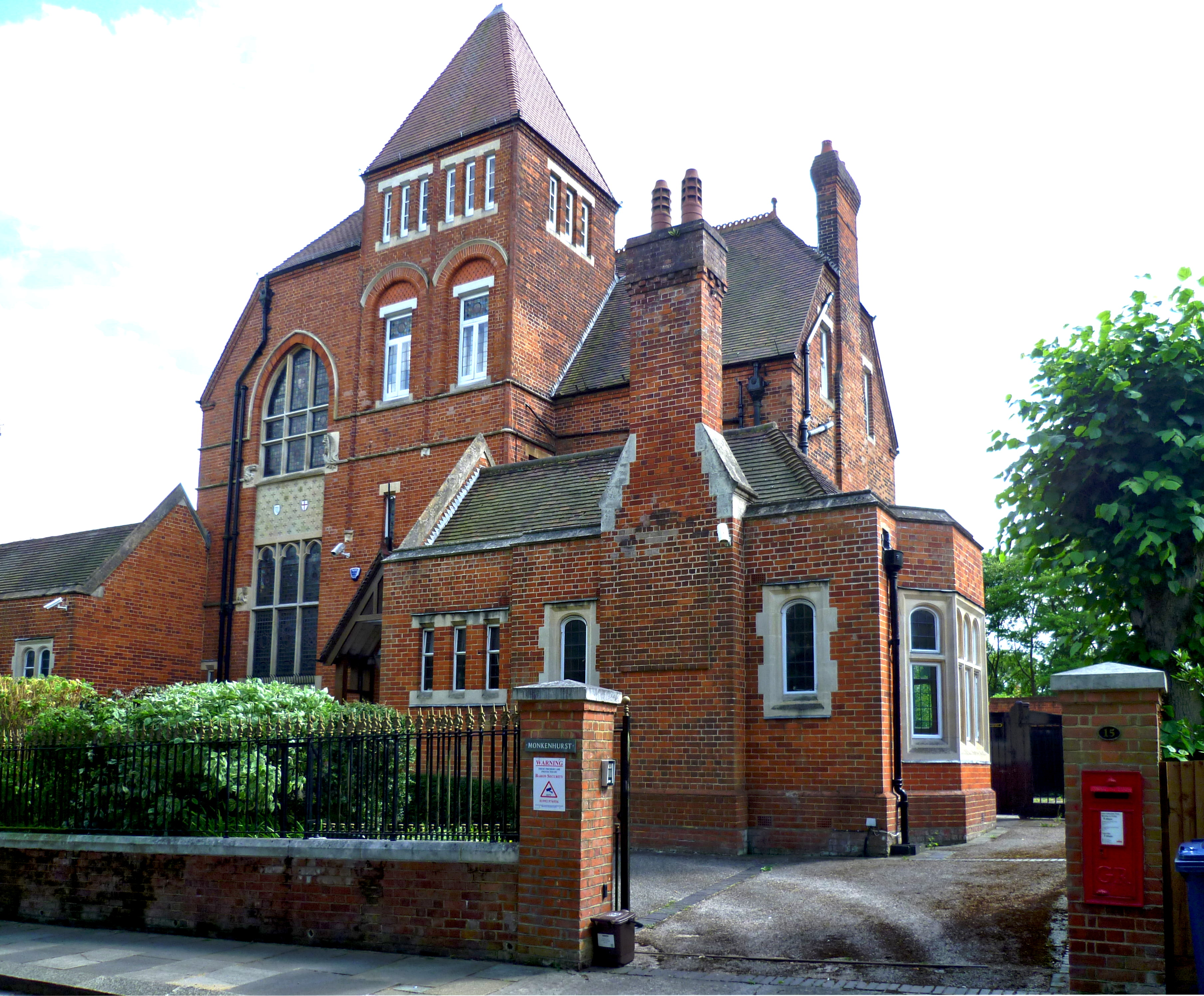
North side, view from The Crescent

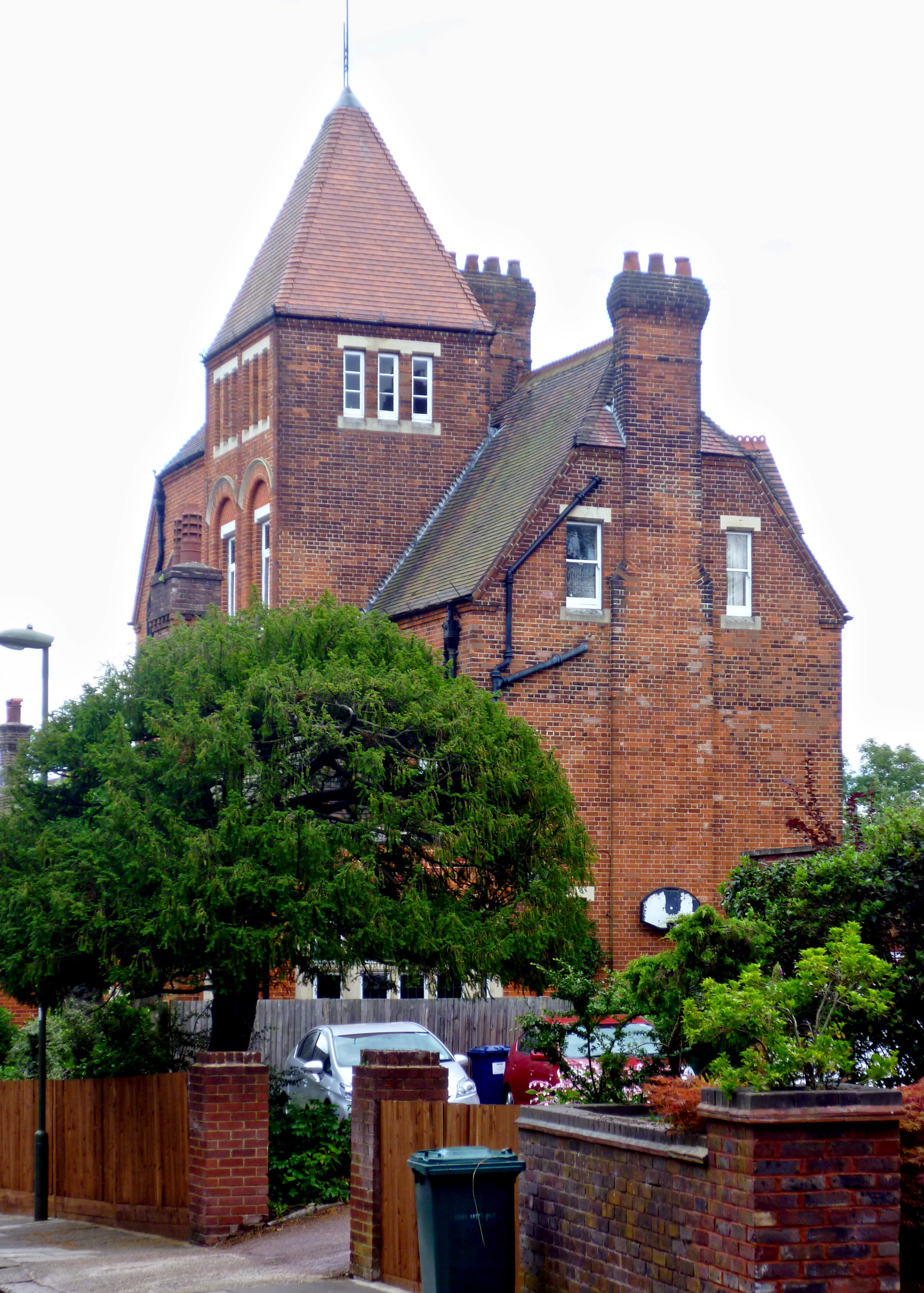
View from the west
