= The Copper Gauntlet =

2015 novel by Holly Black and Cassandra Clare

- United States cover
- Author: Holly Black, Cassandra Clare
- Illustrator: Scott Fischer
- Cover artist: Alexandre Chaudret
- Language: English
- Series: Magisterium
- Release number: Book Two
- Publisher: Scholastic Corporation
- Publication date: September 1, 2015
- Publication place: United States
- Preceded by: The Iron Trial
- Followed by: The Bronze Key

The Copper Gauntlet is the second book in The Magisterium Series written by Holly Black and Cassandra Clare. It was published on September 1, 2015.
