= Carstairs (disambiguation) =

Carstairs is a village near Lanark, Scotland.

Carstairs may also refer to:

== Places ==
- Carstairs, Queensland, Australia, a rural locality
- Carstairs, Alberta, Canada, a town
  - Carstairs/Bishell's Airport, near the town
- Carstairs railway station, serving Carstairs, Scotland
- State Hospital, Carstairs, Scotland, a psychiatric hospital also known as simply Carstairs

== People and fictional characters ==
- Carstairs (surname), a list of people and fictional characters
- Carstairs Douglas (1830–1877), Scottish missionary
- Carstairs Cumming Douglas (1866–1940), Scottish physician, educator and medical author, nephew of the missionary

== Other uses ==
- The Carstairs, American music group
- HMS Carstairs, a World War I Royal Navy minesweeper

== See also ==
- Carstairs Junction, a village by Carstairs station
- Carstairs index of deprivation
