= The Shadowhunter's Codex =

2013 book by Cassandra Clare

- Author: Cassandra Clare and Joshua Lewis
- Cover artist: Cliff Nielsen
- Language: English
- Series: Companion book to The Shadowhunter Chronicles
- Publisher: Margaret K. McElderry
- Publication date: October 29, 2013
- Publication place: United States
- Media type: Print (hardback & paperback)
- Pages: 288 pp (hardback, first edition)

The Shadowhunter's Codex is a companion book to Cassandra Clare's The Shadowhunter Chronicles. The book was authored by both Clare and her husband, Joshua Lewis, and was released on October 29, 2013. The Shadowhunter's Codex is written in the form of an illustrated handbook: a facsimile of the one given to Clary Fray, the protagonist of The Mortal Instruments series.

== Plot ==
This book is Clary Fray's personal copy of the 20th edition of The Shadowhunter's Codex, which contains the history of the Nephilim, or Shadowhunters, as well as information they have compiled. The 20th edition of the book was intended to be an updated version, to help young Shadowhunters in a modern world, although Clary, and her friends, Jace Herondale and Simon Lewis, felt otherwise. Throughout the pages are sketches made by Clary, as well as comments by her and her friends.

== Trivia ==
The Shadowhunter's Codex was actually compiled from notes, timelines, and character summaries that were used as references during the writing of The Shadowhunter Chronicles.
