= Cassandra Clare =

American author (born 1973)

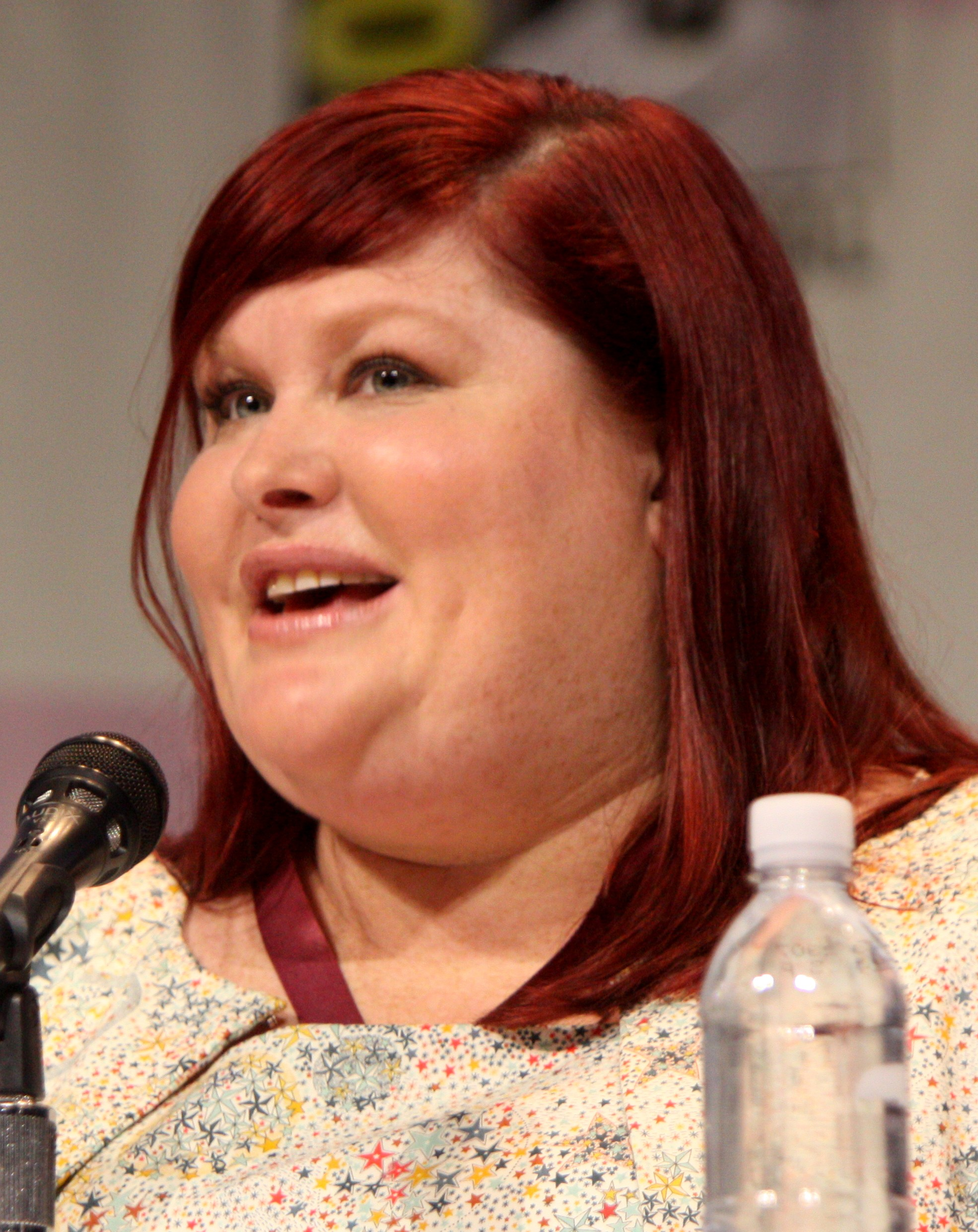
- Clare in 2013
- Born: Judith Rumelt; July 27, 1973 (age 53); Tehran, Iran
- Occupation: Author
- Spouse: Joshua Lewis
- Relatives: Richard Rumelt (father); Max Rosenberg (grandfather)
- Writing career
- Genre: Young adult fiction
- Notable work: The Mortal Instruments series
- Movements: Contemporary fantasy, urban fantasy, fantasy of manners
- Website: cassandraclare.com

Judith Lewis (née Rumelt; born July 27, 1973), better known by her pen name Cassandra Clare, is an American author of young adult fiction, best known for her bestselling series The Mortal Instruments.

== Early life ==
Cassandra Clare was born on July 27, 1973, as Judith Rumelt to American parents in Tehran, Iran. She is the daughter of Richard Rumelt, a business school professor and author, and his first wife, Elizabeth. Her maternal grandfather was film producer Max Rosenberg. Clare is Jewish and has described her family as "not religious".

As a child, Clare traveled frequently, spending time in Switzerland, England, and France. She returned to Los Angeles for high school and from then on, split her time between California and New York City, where she worked at various entertainment magazines and tabloids, including The Hollywood Reporter.

== Career ==
=== The Mortal Instruments series ===
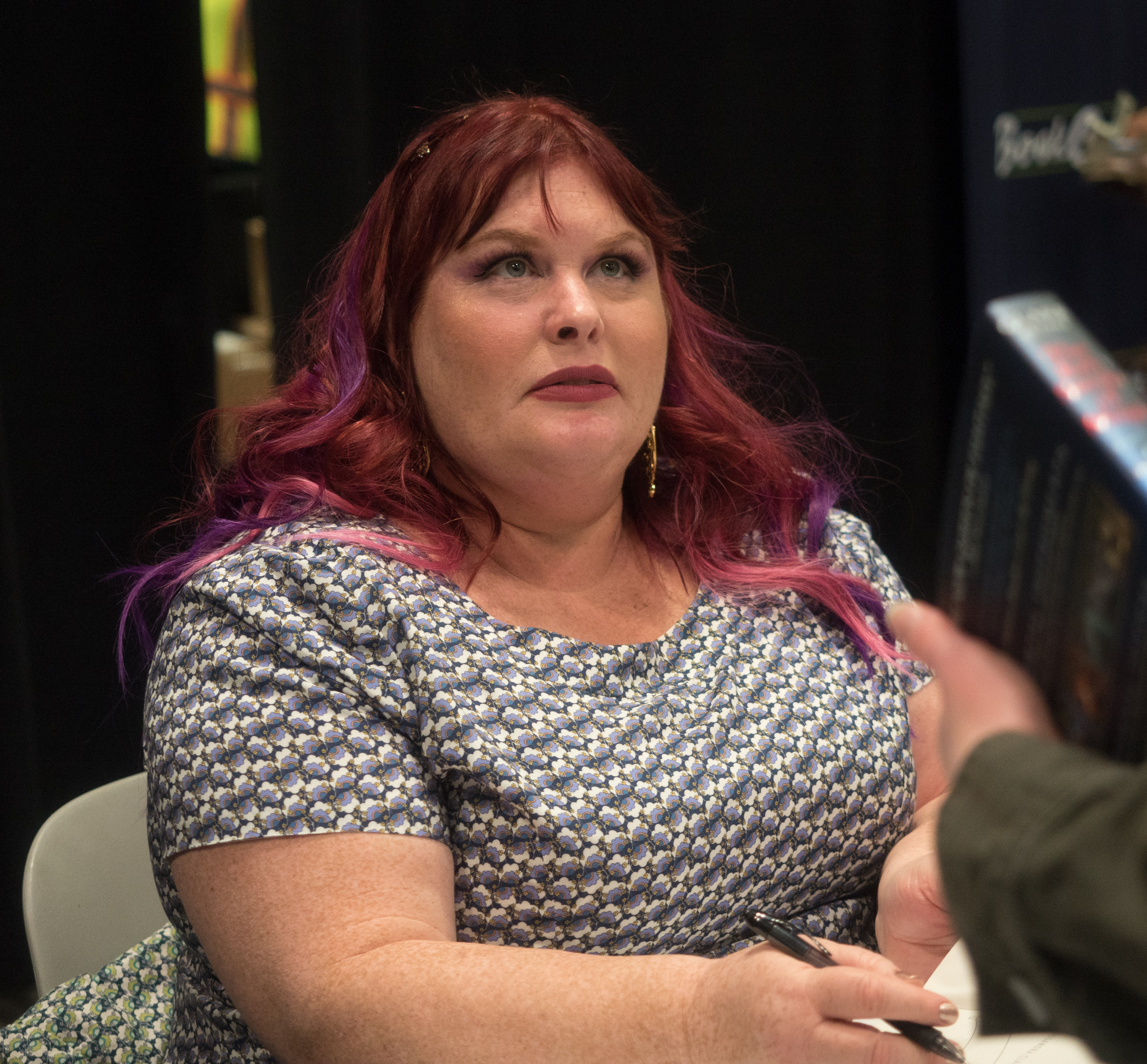
Clare at BookCon in 2019

In 2004, Clare started working on her first published novel, City of Bones, inspired by the urban landscape of Manhattan. City of Bones, released by Simon & Schuster in 2007, is a contemporary fantasy story revolving around characters Clary Fray, Jace Wayland, and Simon Lewis. The book became a New York Times bestseller upon its release. City of Ashes and City of Glass completed the first trilogy. A subsequent second trilogy contained three more books: City of Fallen Angels, City of Lost Souls, and City of Heavenly Fire.

Her publisher also credits Clare with creating the "City of Fallen Angels treatment" where a tangible "letter" from one character to another is attached to the back of physical copies of a book. The goal is to spur print book sales.

The prequel trilogy The Infernal Devices is set in the same universe as The Mortal Instruments, but during in the Victorian era. This consists the books Clockwork Angel, published on August 31, 2010, Clockwork Prince, published on December 6, 2011, and Clockwork Princess, published on March 19, 2013.

A fourth trilogy set in this universe was announced in 2012, collectively known as The Dark Artifices. The contemporary series is set in Los Angeles and follows female shadowhunter Emma Carstairs, who was introduced in City of Heavenly Fire. The first book, Lady Midnight, was released in March 2016; the second, Lord of Shadows was released in April 2017; the third, Queen of Air and Darkness was released on December 4, 2018.

There are also two series of interconnected short stories set in this universe. The first is The Bane Chronicles, completed in 2014 and written with Sarah Rees Brennan and Maureen Johnson, and the second is the planned Tales from the Shadowhunter Academy, written with Brennan and Johnson as well as Robin Wasserman.

The first book in The Mortal Instruments was made into a film, The Mortal Instruments: City of Bones (2013), by Unique Features and Constantin Film. First-time writer Jessica Postigo wrote the screenplay. Lily Collins played Clary Fray and Jamie Campbell Bower played Jace Wayland.

After a disappointing box office performance, subsequent movies in the series were canceled. A television adaptation of The Mortal Instruments called Shadowhunters: The Mortal Instruments began airing in January 2016. It was canceled after the third season.

=== Plagiarism accusations ===
Clare was accused of plagiarism dating back to 2000–2001 when she was writing the fan fiction work The Draco Trilogy. The Christian Science Monitor wrote in 2013 about how Clare's plagiarism and cyberbullying angered many in the Harry Potter online fandom community. Later that year, The Daily Dot described how Clare had copied much of a chapter of The Secret Country (1985), an out-of-print fantasy novel by Pamela Dean, into Clare's own The Draco Trilogy, without attribution to Dean. A complaint by another website user in mid-2001 led to a review by FanFiction.Net administrators, resulting in Clare banned for plagiarism and her writings removed from the website. Clare continued to post her trilogy on a fan fiction Yahoo! group until the series was complete in 2006. She recycled many ideas from The Draco Trilogy into her best-selling book series Mortal Instruments.

Best-selling fantasy novelist Sherrilyn Kenyon sued Clare over claims that Clare copied aspects of Kenyon's Dark-Hunters series (1998) for Clare's Shadowhunters series. The lawsuit contended that characters are similar, that "elements are virtually identical" between the books, and that the term "shadow hunters" was copied. Clare's lawyers released a statement saying that Clare had never read any of Kenyon's books. Simon & Schuster, Clare's publisher, did not comment. Kenyon later removed the central accusation of copyright violation from the lawsuit, leaving the peripheral issue of cover art and branding similarities. She eventually settled out of court and paid her own legal fees.

== Personal life ==
As of 2013, Clare resides in Amherst, Massachusetts, with her husband, Joshua Lewis, and three cats.

She is friends with fellow American author Holly Black, and their books occasionally overlap, Clare mentioning characters from Black's novels and vice versa, such as Val and Luis from Black's Valiant.

== Awards ==
=== City of Bones ===
- 2010 Georgia Peach Book Awards for Teen Readers
- Finalist for the Locus Award for Best First Novel of 2007
- An American Library Association Teens Top Ten Award winner, 2008
- 2010 Georgia Peach Book Awards for Teen Readers
- Winner of The 2010 Abraham Lincoln Illinois High School Book Award
- Winner of the 2010 Pacific Northwest Library Association Young Reader's Choice Award
- A Texas TAYSHAS title 2010
- Shortlisted for the 2010 Evergreen Young Adult Book Award
- Shortlisted for The 2010 Colorado Blue Spruce Young Adult Book Award
- Shortlisted for The North Carolina School Library Media Association Young Adult Book Award
- Oregon Young Adult Network Book Rave Reading List Title 2008
- Shortlisted for the Coventry Inspiration Book Awards

=== City of Ashes ===
- A 2009 ALA Teens Top Ten Title

=== City of Fallen Angels ===
- Best Goodreads Author in 2011

=== City of Heavenly Fire ===
- Goodreads Choice Awards Best Young Adult Fantasy & Science Fiction of 2014

== Bibliography ==
=== The Shadowhunter Chronicles ===
==== The Mortal Instruments ====
- City of Bones (March 27, 2007) ISBN 978-1-481-45592-3
- City of Ashes (March 28, 2008) ISBN 978-1-481-45597-8
- City of Glass (March 24, 2009) ISBN 978-1-481-45598-5
- City of Fallen Angels (April 5, 2011) ISBN 978-1-481-45599-2
- City of Lost Souls (May 8, 2012) ISBN 978-1-481-45600-5
- City of Heavenly Fire (May 27, 2014) ISBN 978-1-481-44442-2

==== Mortal Instruments companion books ====
- Shadowshunters and Downworlders: A Mortal Instruments Reader (with Sarah Rees Brennan, Holly Black, Rachel Caine & Kami Garcia) (January 29, 2013) ISBN 978-1-937-85622-9
- The Shadowhunter's Codex (with Joshua Lewis) (October 29, 2013) ISBN 978-1-442-41692-5
- The Bane Chronicles (with Sarah Rees Brennan & Maureen Johnson) (2013–2014; print edition released November 11, 2014) ISBN 978-1-442-49600-2
- Tales From the Shadowhunter Academy (with Sarah Rees Brennan, Maureen Johnson & Robin Wasserman) (2015; print edition released November 15, 2016) ISBN 978-1-481-44326-5
- A History of Notable Shadowhunters and Denizens of Downworld (illustrated by Cassandra Jean) (February 18, 2016) ISBN 978-1-471-16119-3
- Ghosts of the Shadow Market: An Anthology of Tales (with Sarah Rees Brennan, Maureen Johnson, Robin Wasserman & Kelly Link) (June 4, 2019) ISBN 978-1-534-43362-5
- Better in Black: Ten Stories of Shadowhunter Romance (December 2, 2025)

==== Mortal Instruments graphic novels ====
Art by Cassandra Jean.

- The Mortal Instruments: The Graphic Novel, Vol. 1 (November 7, 2017) ISBN 978-0-316-46581-6
- The Mortal Instruments: The Graphic Novel, Vol. 2 (October 30, 2018) ISBN 978-0-316-46582-3
- The Mortal Instruments: The Graphic Novel, Vol. 3 (October 29, 2019) ISBN 978-0-316-46583-0
- The Mortal Instruments: The Graphic Novel, Vol. 4 (October 24, 2020) ISBN 978-0-316-46584-7
- The Mortal Instruments: The Graphic Novel, Vol. 5 (March 29, 2022)

==== Mortal Instruments coloring books ====
- The Official Mortal Instruments Coloring Book (illustrated by Cassandra Jean) (April 25, 2017) ISBN 978-1-481-49756-5

==== The Infernal Devices ====
- Clockwork Angel (August 31, 2010) ISBN 978-1-481-45602-9
- Clockwork Prince (December 6, 2011) ISBN 978-1-481-45601-2
- Clockwork Princess (March 19, 2013) ISBN 978-1-481-45603-6

==== Infernal Devices graphic novels ====
Art by HyeKyung Baek.

- The Infernal Devices: Clockwork Angel, Volume 1 (October 10, 2012) ISBN 978-0-316-20098-1
- The Infernal Devices: Clockwork Prince, Volume 2 (September 30, 2013) ISBN 978-0-316-20096-7
- The Infernal Devices: Clockwork Princess, Volume 3 (July 22, 2014) ISBN 978-0-316-20097-4

==== The Dark Artifices ====
- Lady Midnight (March 8, 2016) ISBN 978-1-442-46835-1
- Lord of Shadows (May 23, 2017) ISBN 978-1-442-46841-2
- Queen of Air and Darkness (December 4, 2018) ISBN 978-1-442-46844-3

==== The Eldest Curses ====
This series is co-written with Wesley Chu.

- The Red Scrolls of Magic (March 9, 2019) ISBN 978-1-481-49508-0
- The Lost Book of the White (September 1, 2020) ISBN 978-1-481-49512-7
- The Black Volume of the Dead (TBD)

==== The Last Hours ====
- Chain of Gold (March 3, 2020) ISBN 978-1-481-43187-3
- Chain of Iron (March 2, 2021) ISBN 978-1-481-43190-3
- Chain of Thorns (January 31, 2023) ISBN 978-1-481-43193-4

==== The Wicked Powers ====
- The Last King of Faerie (November 3, 2026) ISBN 978-0-593-90347-6
- The Last Prince of Hell (TBD)
- The Last Shadowhunter (TBD)

=== In Fire Foretold series ===
- In Fire Foretold (TBD)
- Untitled (TBD)

=== The Magisterium series ===
This series is written with Holly Black.

- The Iron Trial (September 9, 2014) ISBN 978-0-545-52226-7
- The Copper Gauntlet (September 1, 2015) ISBN 978-0-545-52229-8
- The Bronze Key (August 30, 2016) ISBN 978-0-545-52232-8
- The Silver Mask (October 10, 2017) ISBN 978-0-545-52238-0
- The Golden Tower (September 11, 2018) ISBN 978-0-545-52241-0

=== The Chronicles of Castellane series ===
- Sword Catcher (October 10, 2023)
- The Ragpicker King (March 4, 2025)
- The Bone Conjurers (2028)

=== Short fiction ===
- "The Girl's Guide to Defeating the Dark Lord", Turn the Other Chick, ed. Esther Friesner, Baen Books (2004) (writing as Cassandra Claire)
- "Charming", So Fey, ed. Steve Berman, Haworth Press (2007)
- "Graffiti", Magic in the Mirrorstone, ed. Steve Berman, Mirrorstone Books (2008)
- "Other Boys", The Eternal Kiss, ed. Trisha Telep, Running Press (2009)
- "The Mirror House", Vacations from Hell, ed. Farrin Jacobs, HarperCollins (2009)
- "I Never", Geektastic, ed. Holly Black and Cecil Castelucci, Little, Brown (2009)
- "Cold Hands", ZVU: Zombies Versus Unicorns, ed. Holly Black and Justine Larbalestier, Simon and Schuster (2010)
- "The Perfect Dinner Party" (w/Holly Black), Teeth: Vampire Tales, ed. Ellen Datlow and Terri Windling, HarperCollins (2011)
- "The Rowan Gentleman" (w/Holly Black), in Welcome to Bordertown (2011)
- "Sisters Before Misters" (w/Sarah Rees Brennan & Holly Black) in Dark Duets: All-New Tales of Horror and Dark Fantasy (2014)

=== Fan fiction (writing as Cassandra Claire) ===
- The Draco Trilogy: "Draco Dormiens", "Draco Sinister", and "Draco Veritas" (based on Harry Potter)
- The Very Secret Diaries (based on The Lord of the Rings)
