= The Iron Trial =

2014 novel by Holly Black and Cassandra Clare

- United States cover
- Author: Holly Black, Cassandra Clare
- Illustrator: Scott Fischer
- Cover artist: Alexandre Chaudret
- Language: English
- Series: Magisterium
- Release number: Book One
- Publisher: Scholastic Corporation
- Publication date: September 9, 2014
- Publication place: United States
- Followed by: The Copper Gauntlet

The Iron Trial, written by Holly Black and Cassandra Clare and published September 9, 2014, by Scholastic Corporation, is the first book in The Magisterium Series.

== Plot ==
The protagonist of The Magisterium Series is twelve-year-old Callum (Call) Hunt, raised by his mage father, Alastair Hunt. After the Third Mage War against "The Enemy of Death," also known as Constantine Madden, and the death of his wife Sarah at the Cold Massacre, Alastair decided to spurn magic and raised Call to do the same. Call participates in a test to see whether he has sufficient magic to attend the Magisterium and train to be a mage using the four elements: fire, water, air, and earth.

== Reception ==
The Iron Trial received a starred review from Publishers Weekly, as well as positive reviews from Kirkus.

Kirkus Reviews called the book "[a] promising beginning to a complex exploration of good and evil, as well as friendship’s loyalty."

Maggie Reagan, writing on behalf of Booklist, provided a mixed review, stating, "Expectations are bound to be high for this powerhouse duo’s first co-written effort, and although it doesn’t quite live up to the authors’ respective works...and there are several missed opportunities, the end offers a few intriguing twists and perspectives that hint at what's to come in the next installments."

In 2016, the American Library Association named The Iron Trial one of their top ten Quick Picks for Reluctant Young Adult Readers.
