= Wesley Chu =

Speculative fiction author (born 1976)

- 朱恆昱
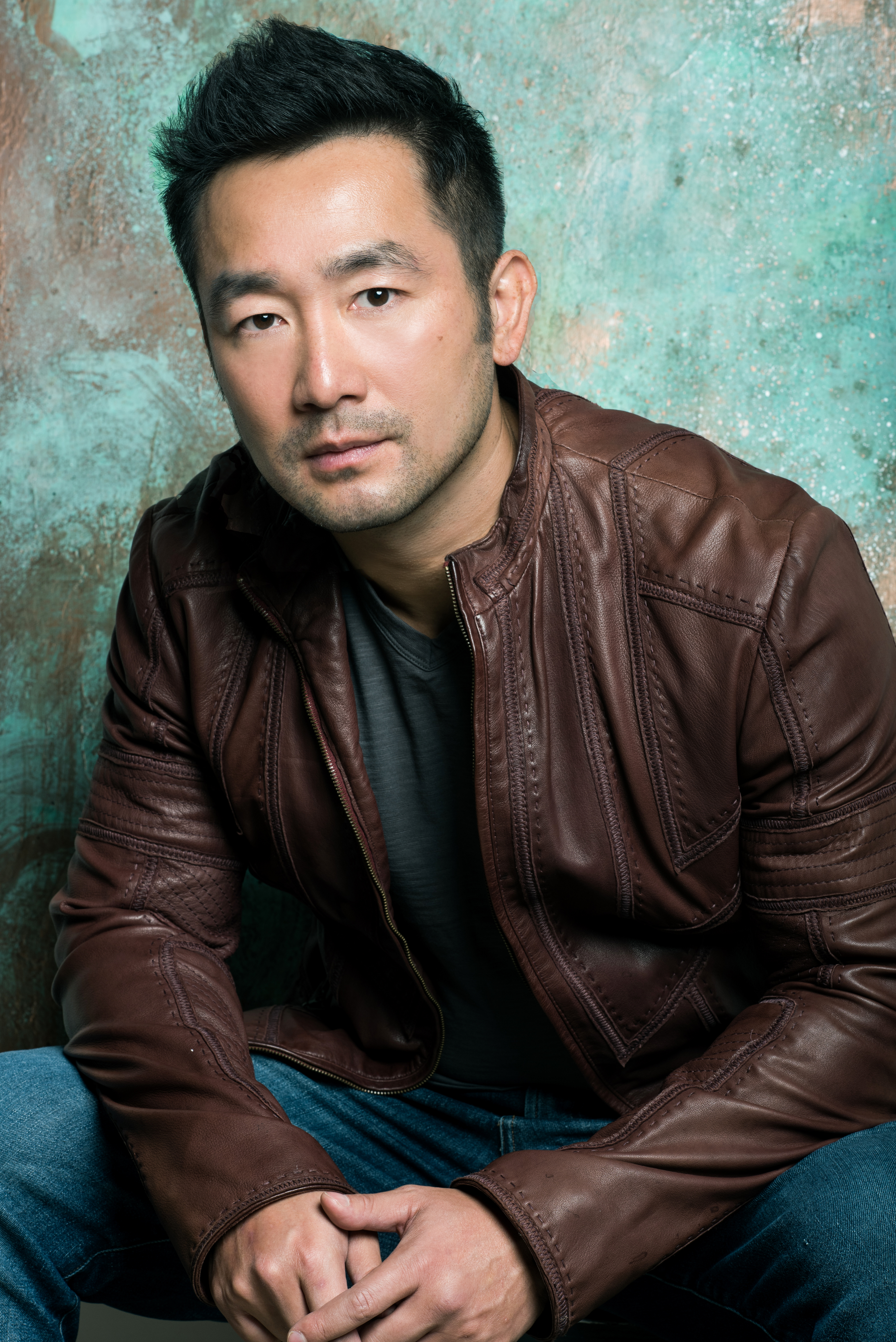
- Chu in 2019
- Born: September 23, 1976 (age 49); Taipei, Taiwan
- Education: University of Illinois Urbana-Champaign (BS)
- Occupations: Novelist, actor, stuntman
- Writing career
- Language: English
- Genres: Speculative fiction; fantasy; science fiction
- Notable works: Tao trilogy; The Red Scrolls of Magic
- Notable awards: Astounding Award for Best New Writer; Alex Award
- Website: wesleychu.com

Wesley Chu
- Traditional Chinese: 朱恆昱
- Simplified Chinese: 朱恒昱
Transcriptions
Standard Mandarin
- Hanyu Pinyin: Zhū Héngyù
- Wade–Giles: Chu Heng-yü

Wesley Chu (朱恆昱) (born September 23, 1976, in Taipei) is a Taiwanese American author of speculative fiction.

== Early life and career ==
Chu was born in Taipei in 1976 and originally raised by his grandparents in Taiwan while his parents were studying in the United States. In 1982, he joined his parents in Lincoln, Nebraska, later settling in Chicago in 1990. He received a degree in management information systems from the University of Illinois, worked consulting jobs, then spent ten years in the banking industry. Chu has acted in film and television, and has also worked as a stuntman. Chu has appeared in several commercials alongside numerous celebrities, such as Michael Jordan.

== Writing career ==
Chu's first novel, The Lives of Tao, was submitted in 2011 to Angry Robot as part of their "Open Door" process, and published in 2013. It was selected as one of the 2014 Alex Awards winners. Chu became a full-time writer in 2014. He was nominated for the Astounding Award for Best New Writer in 2014 and 2015, winning the second time.

Chu signed a contract with Angry Robot early in 2015 for the Io series, new novels set in the same universe as the Tao series. His novel Time Salvager was optioned to Paramount in 2015, with Michael Bay attached to direct.

In 2019, Chu and Cassandra Clare debuted #1 on the New York Times Bestseller list with their novel The Red Scrolls of Magic, the first of The Eldest Curses series, part of The Shadowhunter Chronicles. Robert Kirkman tapped Chu to write the first The Walking Dead novel set in Asia, titled The Walking Dead: Typhoon, which was released on October 1, 2019.

In 2021, it was announced that Original Film and Sony Pictures Television had acquired the rights for Chu's The War Arts Saga, with plans to adapt the novels for television. Chu was listed as an executive producer on the project. In 2022, Kirkus Reviews named The Art of Prophecy one of the best science fiction and fantasy books of the year.

== Bibliography ==
=== Tao series ===
- The Lives of Tao (Angry Robot Books, 2013)
- The Deaths of Tao (Angry Robot Books, 2014)
- The Rebirths of Tao (Angry Robot Books, 2015)
- The Days of Tao (Angry Robot Books, 2016)

=== Time Salvager series ===
- Time Salvager (Tor, 2015)
- Time Siege (Tor, 2016)

=== Io series ===
The Io series (a three-book synopsis exists) is a continuation of the Tao series, centered on new characters, Ella and her alien Io.

- The Rise of Io (Angry Robot Books, 2016)
- The Fall of Io (Angry Robot Books, 2018)

=== The Eldest Curses series (young adult) ===
Co-written with Cassandra Clare and part of The Shadowhunter Chronicles

- The Red Scrolls of Magic (Margaret K. McElderry Books, 2019)
- The Lost Book of the White (Margaret K. McElderry Books, 2020)
- The Black Volume of the Dead (Margaret K. McElderry Books, TBA)

=== The Walking Dead series ===
- The Walking Dead: Typhoon (Skybound Books, 2019)

=== The War Arts Saga ===
- The Art of Prophecy (Del Rey Books, 2022)
- The Art of Destiny (Del Rey Books, 2023)
- The Art of Legend (Del Rey Books, 2025)

== Filmography ==
- Fred Claus (2007)
- The Art of Pain (2008)
