= The Magisterium Series =

Series of fantasy novels by Holly Black and Cassandra Clare

- The Iron Trial (2014); The Copper Gauntlet (2015); The Bronze Key (2016); The Silver Mask (2017); The Golden Tower (2018)
- Author: Holly Black, Cassandra Clare
- Illustrator: Scott Fischer
- Cover artist: Alexandre Chaudret
- Country: United States
- Language: English
- Publisher: Scholastic Corporation
- Published: September 9, 2014 – September 11, 2018
- No. of books: 5

The Magisterium Series is a five-book children's fantasy series written by Holly Black and Cassandra Clare. It is their first collaboration. The series was acquired by Scholastic in April 2012. The first book, The Iron Trial, was published on September 9, 2014, and hit third on the New York Times Middle Grade Bestseller List. The series is set in an underground school where mages train apprentices to control the elements. The books are illustrated by Scott Fischer. The final book, The Golden Tower, was published on September 11, 2018.

== The Iron Trial ==
The protagonist of the series is twelve-year-old Callum Hunt, or Call, who was raised by his father and former mage Alastair Hunt. Alastair rejected the world of magic after the death of his wife Sarah at the Cold Massacre during the Third Mage War. "The Enemy of Death", Constantine Madden, was responsible for her death. In the prologue The Enemy of Death places his soul into the infant Callum Hunts body.

With her dying breath she warns her husband with her knife by carving a message on the walls and cripples her son by shattering the bones in his leg in hopes of killing him.

In the first book, The Iron Trial, Call participates in a series of tests to see whether he has sufficient magic to attend training at the Magisterium in which he attempts to fail due to pressure from his father and is selected by master Rufus due to this. At the Magisterium apprentices are trained to be mages using the four elements of fire, air, water, and earth. Master Rufus decides to take him on as an apprentice. He also selects Tamara Rajavi and Aaron Stewart - the top-ranked students.

During the book, after doing countless seemingly pointless and boring exercises such as sorting sand by shade, the three apprentices become friends after a frigid start and Call starts to decide to stay on at the Magisterium after his Iron year to receive more tutelage and go against his father's wishes. After an exercise in the caverns Call, Tamara, and Aaron are confronted by a fire Devoured who tells them their fates. 'One will die, one will fail, another is already dead.' Call at dinner mentions this to the other students, one of whom, Drew, says the prophecy is complete babble.

When Call walks out of the Cafeteria, Drew asks for a moment to talk to him and says that it wasn't a good idea to tell everyone about the prophecy, but Call gets confused about what Drew means. At this Drew realizes something important and that night runs away leaving a note behind. When his note is found Call and the other apprentices and Masters go to look for him. After finding him Call, Aaron, Tamara, a bronze year student Alex Strike, and Drew are confronted by a pack of chaos-ridden wolves.

Chaos is the fifth element and only Makars can wield it. When confronted Aaron ends up saving their lives by sending the wolves to the void using chaos magic and in doing so reveals himself to be a Makar, astonishing everyone. On the way back to the Magisterium, Jasper DeWinter, someone whom Call dislikes and vice versa, tells everyone the story of Constantine Madden the chaos mage, and why he started the third mage war. While Jasper is telling this story Call finds a chaos-ridden wolf pup in the snow and decides to take the wolf, later named Havoc, into the Magisterium with him without telling anyone.

Later afterward, an incident where Call foolishly decides to participate in an activity that he could not accomplish because of his bad leg that was smashed when he was a baby, Aaron is kidnapped by the Enemy's minions when taking Havoc for a walk.

As neither Tamara nor Call wanted to leave Aaron they decided to save him without telling anyone. Walking in the forest outside the mission gate and the magisterium they come to a bowling alley where they find Aaron tied up and being dangled on top of a chaos elemental by their classmate Drew who works for the Enemy. Tamara releases Aaron and Call tries to leave too, but Drew stops him by releasing the chaos elemental, which kills Drew after he calls the elemental a coward. Chased into another room, Call is confronted by the Enemy of Death who, while being briefly angry about his son Drew's death, takes off his mask and tells Call that Call is Constantine Madden, The Enemy of Death and that he is Master Joseph who taught Constantine/Call.

Callum and Master Joseph have a conversation where Joseph explains that during the Cold Massacre Constantine had been mortally wounded and was dying, so he placed his soul into the body of a baby. That baby was Callum. Call also finds out that his father suspects he is The Enemy of Death as during the massacre after Constantine's soul had entered Call's body, Call's mother had written the words, 'Kill the Child' on the ice where she lay almost dead.

Alastair had also sent a letter to Master Rufus earlier that year asking him to bind Callum's magic, sending Master Rufus a wristband that later turned out to be Constantine's. Then, Tamara and Aaron accidentally broke the roof with the bowling alley sign.

Master Joseph disappeared and Call was rescued. Later, Call was back at the Infirmary after passing out. There he has a conversation with Master Rufus about what happened in the bowling alley. Call doesn't tell him though, about Master Joseph and their conversation. After that, Master Rufus gives him permission to contact his father. When Call is out of the Infirmary, he and his friends pass through the First Gate.

== The Copper Gauntlet ==
In the book two, The Copper Gauntlet, Call finds that his father may be trying to destroy both him and Havoc and runs away from home to go back to the magical world. When he leaves his house he notices a design of what appears to be a copper gauntlet. He meets up with his friends Aaron and Tamara at Tamara's house. There, he meets Alex Strike, the boyfriend of Tamara's sister, Kimiya. Call finds out from Tamara's parents that his dad used to be an exceptional metal mage. They go back to the Magisterium when they find out that an attack was made on a dangerous weapon called the Alkahest.

They research the Alkahest and discover that it's the copper gauntlet that Call's dad, Alastair was researching. The Alkahest is a weapon that can only harm a Makar and can be used to rip out the Makar's soul. Call predicts that his dad faked an attack on the Alkahest so that they'd move the Alkahest to a more secure vault made of metal. He concludes that Alastair wants to use the Alkahest on Call to destroy Constantine's soul and potentially kill Call. He tells Tamara about his dad potentially trying to steal the Alkahest.

Tamara misunderstands Call's concerns and thinks that Alastair wants to use the Alkahest to kill Aaron. She tells Master Rufus this and later, it is confirmed that the Alkahest is missing.

Alex Strike tells Call that the mages will not hesitate to kill his dad to protect the Makar, Aaron, so Call decides to set out to find and warn his dad. Tamara and Aaron agree to go with him, and because Jasper catches them, they force Jasper to come along with them. They stop at a junkyard where they think Calls father may have been and they find letters from Master Joseph, to his father that describe his location using coordinate points. That night, they wake up to find a metal elemental named, Automotones.

Automotones was controlled by the school, and after defeating it they decide that they can not return to the Magisterium. They are found by the Masters on the highway, and the Masters use air elementals to take control of their car and carry them away. Call and the others escape the car and hide out and rest in a cave, made by Aaron. The next day they are surrounded by Chaos-ridden. Instead of killing them, the Chaos-ridden kneel in front of Call and Call is forced to explain his identity to everyone there.

They are escorted by the army to the coordinate points which turns out to be a tomb. In the tomb, it is revealed that Constantine's body is still intact and that Joseph plans to transfer the soul from Call's body to Constantine's body. His plans are quickly foiled though, as Alastair quickly steals the Alkahest and destroys Constantine Madden's body, therefore foiling the plan to transfer the souls. Because of Constantine's death, Call receives the chaos magic in Constantine's body and becomes a Makar.

They quickly escape, and bring along Constantine's head as proof they killed the "Enemy", but his soul was still living inside Call. When they get back, they are praised as heroes, but a shocking fact is revealed. Nobody from the Assembly sent the elementals.

== The Bronze Key ==
In the third book, The Bronze Key, the action starts shortly after the ending of the second as Call, Aaron and Tamara are beginning their third or bronze year at the Magisterium. The book picks up the story with a death among the students and a spy on the loose threatening Call. The group is invited to a party in their honor, where two tragic incidents occur.

First, Call is almost killed by a falling chandelier when he is invited to a room by Celia with a note, but it is not as it seems. A few minutes later, he sees Jennifer, the person who delivered the note, dead in the water. This throws the party into chaos, and everybody starts to evacuate. Call's dad takes the children to the Magisterium, where he believes they will be safe. Tamara and Aaron both believe that the spy, who they think tried to kill Call, is from the Magisterium, so they both keep an eye on Call 24/7. But that night, when Call comes to bed he is attacked by an elemental and almost killed if Aaron didn't step in and send the elemental to the void using his Makar or chaos powers.

They started to investigate themselves and wanted to go down to the prison where they held the elementals. But to do that, they would have to break into Anastasia Tarquin's room, Alex's stepmother. Upon entering Anastasia's room, they discover that the key they look for is hidden inside a voice-activated safe. After multiple faulty attempts, Call comes to a realization and enunciates the word that opens the safe: Jericho. Jericho is the name of Constantine's twin brother, killed in an accident while they were students.

Constantine was driven to find a method of "curing death" because of the loss of his brother. After retrieving the key, the trio enter it in the elemental gate, and as the gates disappear, they rush inside with a purpose. No information is retrieved from the elementals. Master Rufus surprises them by announcing that Alma, the leader of the Order of Disorder, will be teaching Aaron and Call. Aaron and Call make a deal with Alma to help her free the Chaos-ridden animals if she helps them communicate with the first victim, Jennifer.

Later, Callum and Aaron help free the Chaos-ridden, assisted by Anastasia Tarquin and Alex Strike. Call passes out in a truck. When he wakes up, Aaron goes with him to visit Alma. Alma teaches them how to communicate with the dead. Callum interrogates Jennifer and finds out that she was killed by a "boy she liked" and Jennifer starts screaming for Kimiya to stay away. While trying to figure out more information, Callum accidentally raises her from the dead and Alma becomes suspicious of him. Call runs back to the hospital to find out that Tamara has left.

They head back to their rooms when Alex rushes through the gates and alerts them that Tamara was kidnapped by the spy, and Havoc ran off into the woods surrounding the Magisterium. After running with Alex for a while, Call asks Alex to take off his hoodie. Upon seeing two blue stripes up his sleeve, (which Call recognizes from a photograph of Constantine and Master Joseph) Call realizes that Alex is indeed the spy in the Magisterium, working for the Enemy of Death. Alex drags the pair to his hideout in the woods and extracts the Chaos from Aaron's body using the Alkahest, killing him in the process.

After subduing Call and Tamara, Alex escapes with wounds inflicted by Havoc. The masters arrive, and in Call's desperation rant about how he didn't do it, he mentions that he is the Enemy of Death, and the Masters "clap him in chains" He is taken to the Panopticon, the prison, and as the book ends, Anastasia Tarquin is at Call's cell door, telling him she shall free him, and that he is her "son" as she was Constantine's mother.

== The Silver Mask ==
The fourth book begins in The Panopticon, where Call stands in the last half of the year. Jasper is visiting him, but Tamara and Anastasia Tarquin help Call to go off The Prison at the same time. Master Joseph then forces Call to bring Aaron back from the dead, but he ends up being a skewed and different version of Aaron. Jasper and Tamara escape the clutches of Master Joseph and alert the Magisterium as to the whereabouts of Call. Preparing for the Fourth Mage War.

== Reception ==
The first book in the series, The Iron Trial, was well received. Kirkus Reviews praised the setting and "refreshingly nuanced" characters, and a Publishers Weekly starred review predicted that the "string of ominous revelations" would leave readers wanting more. Though Kirkus noted that the similarities to Harry Potter can be distracting, a reviewer at The Daily Telegraph wrote that the book "moves deftly into the gap" left by the JK Rowling series.

In 2012, Constantin Film acquired the production rights. Black and Clare will adapt the script themselves, and serve as executive producers. Constantin is one of the production companies behind another adaptation of Clare's, The Mortal Instruments: City of Bones as well as the production company for its TV adaptation Shadowhunters on Freeform.
