= Savannah Johnson Speak =

Savannah Johnson Speak (4 September 1868 – 29 December 1929) was an English mining engineer and metallurgist. He received a technical education at the Yorkshire College and the Royal School of Mines after which he worked in mining around the world and lectured in metallurgy at the University of Sydney. He was in business as a consultant engineer in London and was president of the Institution of Mining and Metallurgy from 1922-23.

== Early life ==
Savannah Johnson Speak was born on 4 September 1868 at East Bierley, Yorkshire, to Savannah Speak and his wife Annie. His father was a "cotton warp dresser". He was schooled at Saltaire and received his advanced education at the Yorkshire College (1886–89) which specialised in scientific and technical subjects such as mining and geology and eventually was adsorbed into the University of Leeds. This was followed by study at the Royal School of Mines.

== Career ==
Speak worked in Transvaal in 1890 and in German South West Africa in 1891. He was lecturer in metallurgy at the University of Sydney from 1892 to 1894. He was a metallurgist at the Geldenhuis Deep Gold Mine, Johannesburg, in 1895-97 and worked in the Dutch East Indies 1898-99. He also worked in West Africa, Celebes, Korea, British Columbia, Siberia, Argentina, and Northern Rhodesia.

From 1905, Speak was a consulting engineer, practicing from London Wall Buildings, and became a partner in the firm of Hooper, Speak & Co. He was president of the Institution of Mining and Metallurgy from 1922-23.

== Later life ==
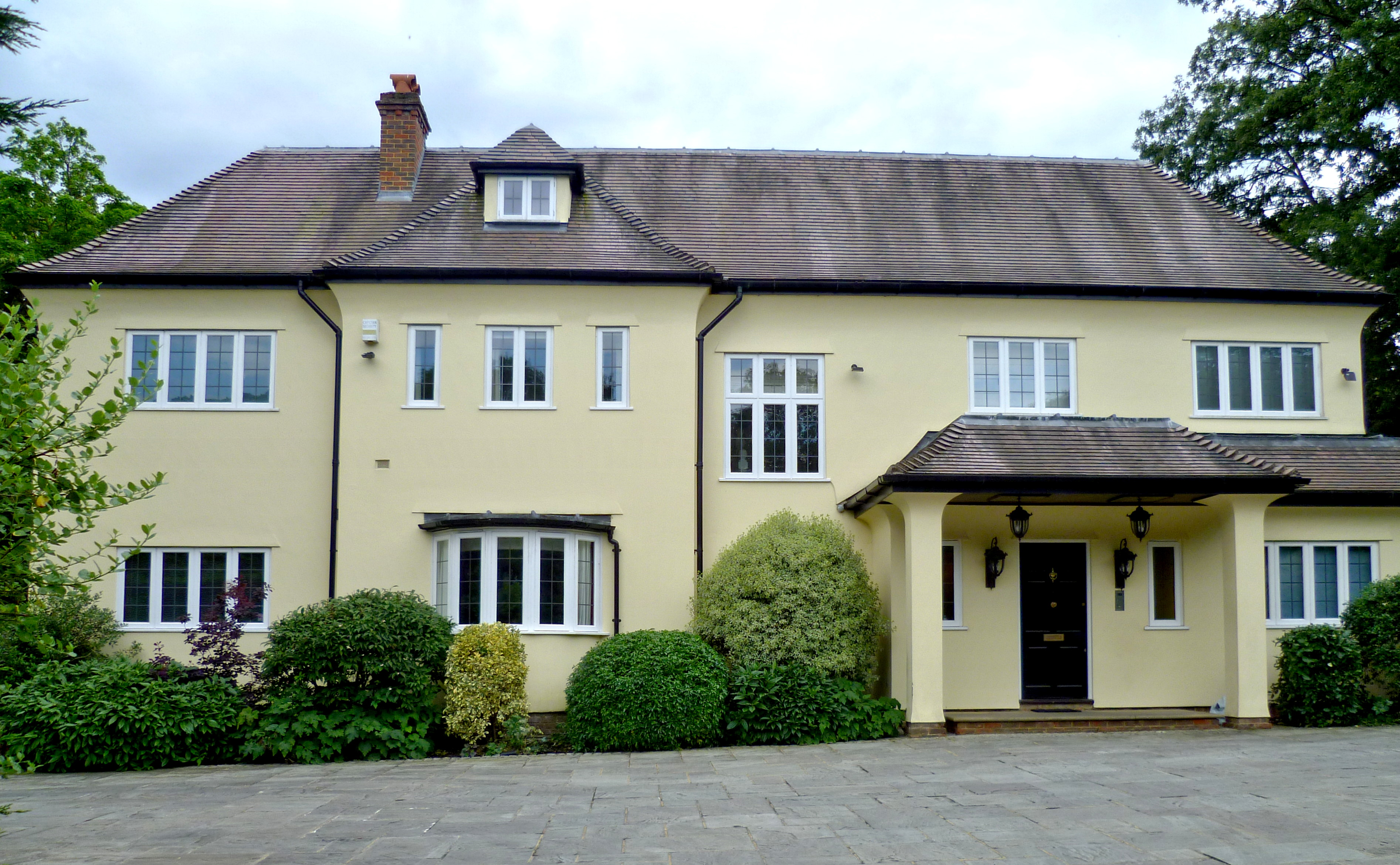
Dixton, seen in 2015.

In the 1920s, Speak was resident at Monkenhurst, New Barnet, on the edge of Monken Hadley Common. He died on 29 December 1929 at Dixton, Hadley Common, leaving an estate of £14,439. His executors were Ethel Maud Speak, widow, and William Henry Speak, merchant.
