= Peter Dollar =

English architect and surveyor

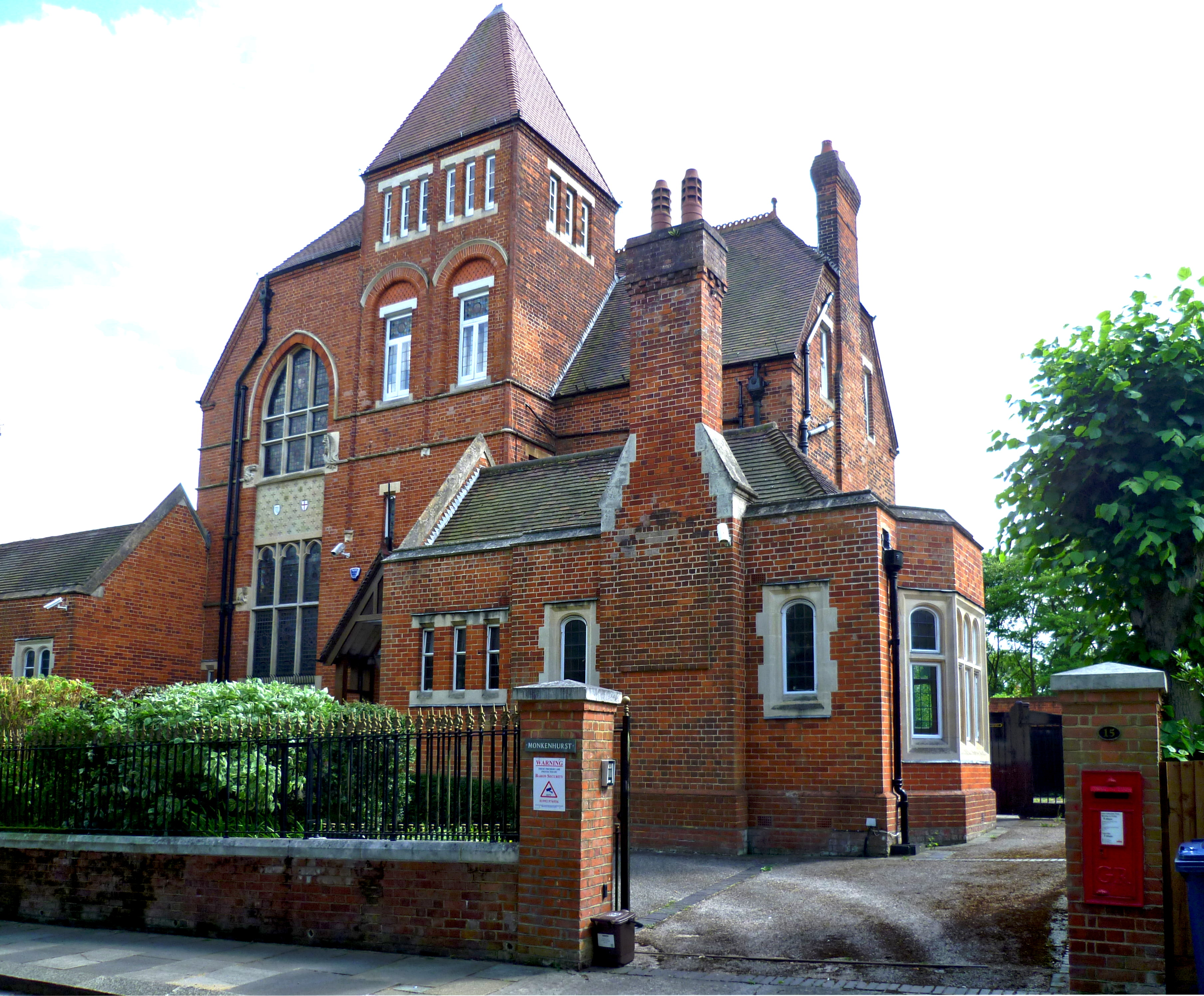
Monkenhurst, north London, designed by Peter Dollar.

Peter Dollar ARIBA (1847 - 28 October 1943) was an English architect and surveyor noted for his cinema designs.

== Early life ==
Peter Dollar was born in Henley-on-Thames, Oxfordshire, in 1847.

== Family ==
Dollar married Emily Ada (died 1937) and they had at least two sons, one born 22 October 1899 at 13 Hyde Park Square, Bayswater, London, and a second, Graham, born in 1905 and who died during the Second World War.

== Career ==
Dollar designed Monkenhurst house in north London in 1880 and The Majestic Picturedrome which opened in Tottenham Court Road in 1912. He practiced from 44 Great Marlborough Street, London, (1879–92) and later at Craig's Court House, Charing Cross, and 7 Arundel Street. He was an associate member of the Royal Institute of British Architects. According to John Heathfield of the Friern Barnet & District Local History Society, he is credited with introducing the idea of a raked or sloping floor in his early cinemas.

== Death and legacy ==
Dollar died on 28 October 1943 at 13 Hyde Park Square. He left an estate of £28,567. Probate was granted at Llandudno to his son Major Graham Dollar of the British Army who himself died in 1944 and is buried at the Ancona War Cemetery in Italy.
