= Clockwork Princess =

2013 novel by Cassandra Clare

- First edition
- Author: Cassandra Clare
- Cover artist: Cliff Nielsen
- Language: English
- Series: The Infernal Devices
- Genre: Fantasy, Adventure
- Publisher: Margaret K. McElderry Books
- Publication date: March 19, 2013
- Publication place: United States
- Pages: 570 (hardback); 576 (paperback)
- Preceded by: Clockwork Prince

Clockwork Princess is a 2013 fantasy novel written by young adult author Cassandra Clare. It is the third and final installment of The Infernal Devices trilogy, following the first book, Clockwork Angel, and the second book, Clockwork Prince. It is written in the third person through the perspective of the main protagonist, Tessa Gray, who resides in the Shadowhunter's London Institute. This final installment follows Tessa and her friends as they face off against the series main antagonist, The Magister (also known as Axel Mortmain), who plans to completely obliterate the Shadowhunter race.

== Plot ==
Two months after the events of the previous book, Tessa Gray is in the midst of preparing for her wedding to Jem Carstairs. Gabriel Lightwood arrives at the Institute and requests help in taking care of his father, Benedict, whose demon pox has turned him into a worm, killing the Lightwood's servants and Rupert Blackthorn, the husband of his daughter, Tatiana. At the end, Gabriel and his brother, Gideon, have no choice but to kill their father, creating a rift between the brothers and Tatiana. Gabriel moves to the London Institute and develops a relationship with Will Herondale's sister, Cecily, who has also taken residence in the institute after failing to convince Will to return home, much to Will's annoyance.

Jem gets sick faster and Will realizes that he has taken an unusually higher dosage of yin fen so he can stay stronger for the wedding. However, Axel Mortmain has bought all of London's stock of yin fen, wanting to blackmail the Institute into handing over Tessa in exchange for the drug. Jem refuses to even consider the offer and convinces Tessa to do the same, so they decide to move the date of their wedding earlier. Meanwhile, Consul Josiah Wayland, now increasingly frustrated by Charlotte Branwell's refusal to be his lapdog, attempts to convince Gideon and Gabriel to betray her in exchange for the Lightwood's honor to be restored. Gideon steadfastly refuses, but Gabriel has to go through some time before he finally chooses to side with Charlotte.

After undergoing trials at Silent City, Jessamine Lovelace is sent back to the London Institute. On the day of her arrival, automatons and Mrs. Black attack the Institute and mortally wounds Jessie before taking Tessa away. Before she dies, she leaves clues for Will and Cecily about where Mortmain is taking Tessa to: Cadair Idris. Jem collapses from his illness and learns about Will's unrequited love for Tessa, before urging him to save her in his stead. While Will is on his way, he feels his parabatai bond with Jem severed and realizes that Jem is gone. Back at the institute, Charlotte's attempt to rally the Enclave to support her fails, managing only to gather Sophie, Cecily, Gideon, Gabriel, Magnus Bane, and three Silent Brothers for the mission to stop Mortmain. Henry and Magnus create a device capable of transporting people through great distances, dubbed as the Portal. Meanwhile, Wayland gathers the Clave for an emergency meeting to depose Charlotte, only for the automatons to attack them and kill him and Aloysius Starkweather.

On the way to Wales, Tessa briefly frees herself from Mrs. Black, now a disembodied head attached to an automaton body, and discovers that her clockwork angel pendant holds an essence of the angel Ithuriel. Upon arrival at Cadair Idris, Tessa is forced to shapeshift into John Shade and teach Mortmain how to create automatons capable of powered by demonic spirits and immune to Nephilim weapons. Mortmain reveals that Tessa was born to a Greater Demon father and a Shadowhunter mother, a feat normally impossible since demon-Nephilim children are usually born dead due to the Marks. By switching Elizabeth Gray with Adele Starkweather, Aloysius' granddaughter who died when she was young, "Elizabeth" grew up to be a Shadowhunter who was not Marked. By additionally giving Elizabeth the protection of Ithuriel, Tessa could be delivered alive. Mortmain arranged for Tessa to start a new race of demon-Nephilim hybrids. Will reunites with Tessa and consummates with her—and in the process, Will receives a star-shaped mark on his skin where it touched Tessa's clockwork angel necklace pendant (a mark that is visible in future generations of male Herondales throughout the Shadowhunters Chronicles and also on others who were touched by the angel such as Clary Fray/Fairchild). Will and Tessa meet up with Charlotte and the others and begin battling through Mortmain's automatons, learning to their shock that one of the Silent Brothers, Brother Zachariah, is Jem. Henry is gravely wounded and left paraplegic, even after Magnus successfully saved him. As Tessa is about to be captured by Mortmain, she shapeshifts into Ithuriel himself (the angel in Tessa's clockwork angel pendant) and incinerates Mortmain, before falling unconscious for several days.

Upon her recovery, Jem, now Brother Zachariah, visits Tessa and promises to meet her every year for an hour at Blackfriars Bridge before departing for Silent City. Charlotte is offered the job of Consul and plans to train Will to succeed her as head of the London Institute. Gideon proposes to Sophie and accompanies her as she undergoes Ascension to become a Shadowhunter. At the Christmas celebration of that year, Magnus leaves for the New World and makes Will promise to find his own happiness. After speaking with Jessamine's ghost, Will proposes to Tessa, who accepts. Subsequently, Will and Cecily introduce Tessa and Gabriel, respectively, to their parents.

In the years that follow, Tessa marries Will and has a son James, named after Jem. However, she does not grow old with him and has to watch as Henry and Gideon pass away, before Will follows them in 1937. Afterwards, Tessa leaves her family for good, unable to see any more of her loved ones dying, and becomes a wanderer, though she continues to keep in touch with Jem every year, while tracking her descendants from afar. In 2008, more than seventy years after Will died, Tessa is shocked to see that Jem is no longer a Silent Brother, thanks to a twist of events. Although she is wary of having to see him grow old again, she nevertheless wants to travel the world once more with him.

== Release ==
=== Critical reception ===
The novel received positive reviews from various critics. It received the #1 spot on Publishers Weekly bestseller's list, having sold over 68,000 copies within its first week according to outlets that report to Nielson BookScan. Breia Brissey from Entertainment Weekly gave the novel an A−, calling it, "Clare's best undertaking to date". Brissey also states that it's "as addictive as — and dare we say better than? — Clare’s original franchise," in reference to Clare's first Shadowhunter Chronicles series, The Mortal Instruments. The Guardian: Children's book reviewer thanks Clare in their article, stating that the book made them "more than happy and fulfilled." Clockwork Princess debuted at #1 on Wall Street Journal's Best Seller list.

Clockwork Princess was also a finalist for the Children's & Teen Choice Book Awards from The Children's Book Council.

=== Promotion ===
Sally Lodge of Publishers Weekly writes on how Clare uses social media in order to promote her new novel. Clare took to Twitter to post a link, revealing the first chapter of the book. Following the chapter reveal, fans participated in a cover reveal for the book, accumulating over 30,000 tweets in the span of two hours. Little by little, the cover of the story was revealed to the world. Anne Zafian, VP and deputy publisher of Simon and Schuster Children's Publishing, states, "We are always trying to bring something new to the table while promoting Cassie's books...Since she has such a good online outreach and social networking skills, it was great that, with the Twitter campaign, the first chapter could be revealed worldwide at one time." Clare also said that she was "thrilled" by the response from her followers and was thankful to be able to see everyone's reactions and theories as they read.

Other marketing efforts for the novel included the release of Clare's Shadowhunters App for Apple and Android, which launched early February 2013 and gave a first look into the book's prologue. Clockwork Princess's trailer was revealed on Entertainment Weekly's Shelf Life blog on February 21.

== Publication history ==
Clockwork Princess was first released in the United States on March 19, 2013, and published by Margaret K. McElderry Books (Simon and Schuster Publishing).

=== Sales ===
The book sold over 68,000 copies within its first week after its release. The Infernal Devices series had a global in-print tally of six million copies and there were one million copies of Clockwork Princess printed by the time of its release.

== Film adaptation ==
Cassandra Clare confirmed on her website that The Infernal Devices series has been optioned as a film by the same people who optioned The Mortal Instruments: City of Bones movie, Constantin Film. In 2019, it was in the early stages of development.
