= Henrietta Carstairs =

British mountaineer

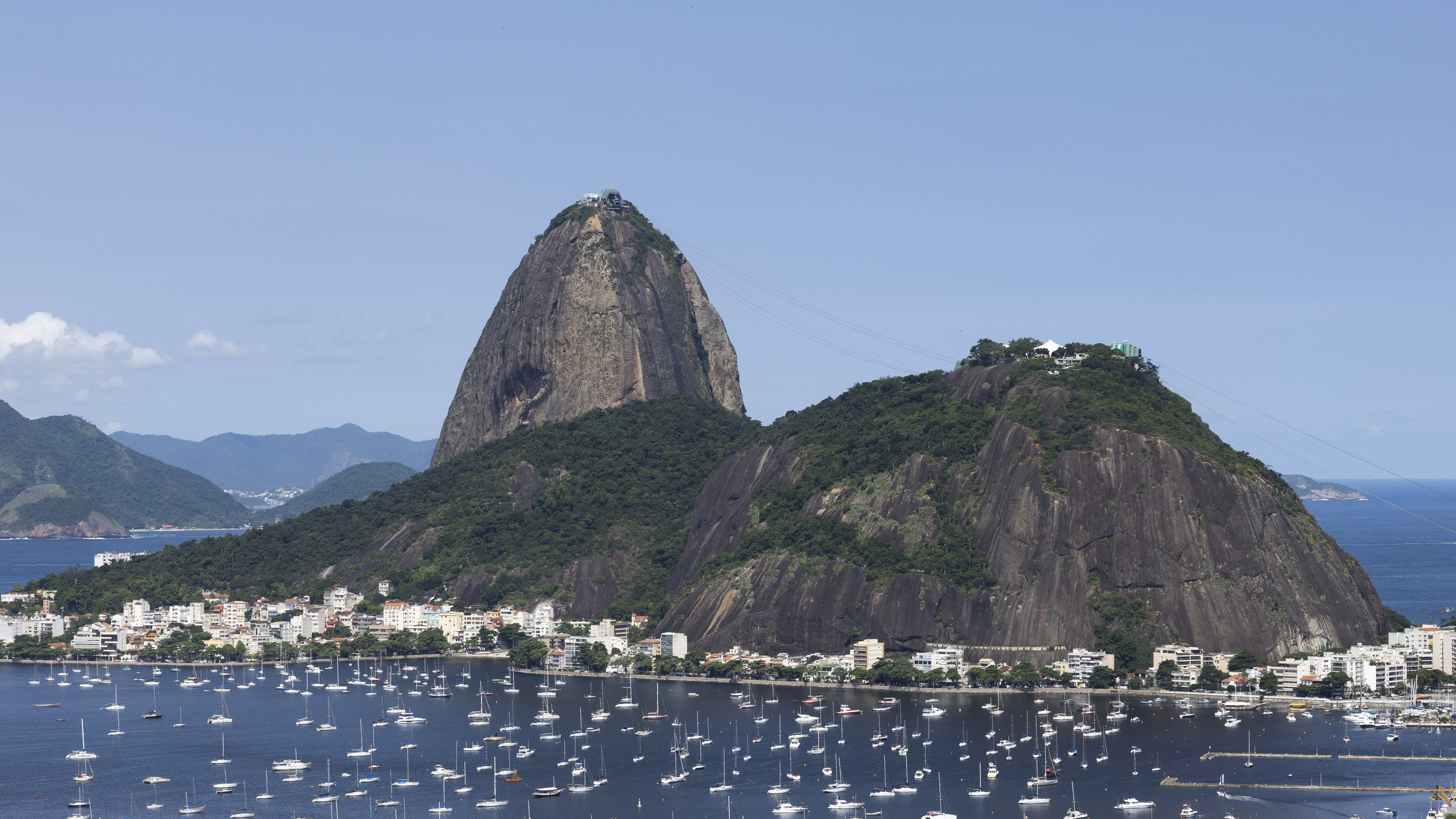
Sugarloaf Mountain, which Carstairs was the first person to climb.

Henrietta Carstairs (1777/78 – after 1817) was a British mountaineer and nanny known for becoming the first person to climb the Sugarloaf Mountain in Rio de Janeiro, Brazil, in 1817.

== Sugarloaf Mountain ==
In 1817, Carstairs was the first person to ascend the 395 metres (1,296 ft) Sugarloaf Mountain in Rio de Janeiro, Brazil. Upon reaching the summit, she placed a Union Jack there. Legend holds that a Portuguese national later replaced the Union Jack with a Portuguese flag.
