= Clockwork Angel =

2010 novel by Cassandra Clare

- First edition
- Author: Cassandra Clare
- Cover artist: Cliff Nielsen
- Language: English
- Series: The Infernal Devices
- Genre: Fantasy, Adventure
- Publisher: Margaret K. McElderry Books
- Publication date: August 31, 2010
- Publication place: United States
- Media type: Print, e-book, audio book
- Pages: 448
- ISBN: 978-1-4169-7586-1
- Followed by: Clockwork Prince

Clockwork Angel is the first installment of The Infernal Devices trilogy by Cassandra Clare. After the death of her aunt, Tessa Gray is sent a ticket to travel to London by her brother Nathaniel. On arrival, she is kidnapped and abused by two cruel sisters (Mrs. Black and Mrs. Dark) who work under the name of 'The Dark Sisters', until her eventual saving by a group of people who are referred to as Shadowhunters. The rest of the book is based around her discovering the Shadow world and making a life with the new people she encounters.

The book became a best-seller in the New York Times list, debuting number 1 on the children's bestselling list.

The book also contains many quotes referring to famous pieces of Victorian literature, for example, Oscar Wilde's The Importance of Being Earnest, Charles Dickens' A Tale of Two Cities, and the works of Samuel Taylor Coleridge and Alfred Tennyson.

== Plot ==
In 1878, Tessa Gray arrives from New York City to Southampton on the invitation of her brother, Nate, who has been working in London for the past few years, following the death of their aunt and foster mother, Harriet. However, she is kidnapped by a pair of warlocks, Mrs. Black and Mrs. Dark, who force her to learn her previously unknown ability to shapeshift at the threat of Nate's safety. They intend to make her presentable to marry their lord, known only as the Magister.

Six weeks later, Tessa is rescued by a pair of Shadowhunters—the older one named Henry Branwell and the younger named Will Herondale - who decapitate Mrs. Black and force Mrs. Dark to flee. Henry and Will take Tessa along with them to the London Institute, run by Henry's wife, Charlotte, and housing two other Shadowhunters: Jem Carstairs and Jessie Lovelace, as well as three mundane innkeepers: Sophie Collins, Thomas Tanner, and Agatha, who she is introduced to. After being examined by the Silent Brother Enoch, Charlotte tells Tessa that she is a Downworlder. However, it is unclear what exactly, other than the fact that she is capable of shapeshifting into anyone by holding any of their personal belongings.

The next day, Jessie decides to take Tessa to shop for clothes and reveals during their stroll through Hyde Park that she despised being a shadowhunter and wished to be a proper lady. after a long day jayden wood and tessa go the eirc grey The two of them are attacked by a goblin, which Jessie destroys with her parasol. Meanwhile, Charlotte learns from Axel Mortmain, Nate's former boss, that he was forced to work for Alexei de Quincey, head of London's vampire clan and the presumed identity of the Magister, leader of the secretive Pandemonium Club. Later, a vampire named Camille Belcourt visits the Institute and tells Charlotte that de Quincey is holding a party where his clan will prey on humans, in breach of the Accords with the Clave. Tessa disguises herself as Camille and visits the party with Will, where she encounters the warlock Magnus Bane, Camille's lover. The two discover that de Quincey's hostage is Nate, before alerting the Enclave to appear and kill most of the vampires, save de Quincey. The Enclave take Nate back to the Institute to be interrogated regarding de Quincey. Tessa helps Will take his medicine and they briefly kiss, not before Tessa heard the name 'Cecily' being whispered by Will. She is stung.

The following evening, Tessa overhears the heated argument between Jem, Will and Charlotte, the latter assuming that it was due to the previous night's fiasco. Tessa barges in and gives Will a piece of her mind, shortly leaves the Institute in fury and settles near the front stairs. Jem finds her and offers to take her through his favorite places in London at night to which she agrees. They are attacked by automatons hired by the Magister which nearly breach through the Institute before they are put down. Jem collapses and confesses later in his room to Tessa that the demon attack that killed his parents and forced him to move to London also made him depend on a demonic drug that will kill him in a few years. Nate recovers and tells the Institute that de Quincey is holing up in Chelsea. While most of the Enclave head to Chelsea to kill him, Tessa, Will, Jem, Jessie, Nate, and the innkeepers stay behind in the Institute. Mortmain arrives and informs them that Mrs. Dark is about to perform a spell to animate hundreds of automatons de Quincey possesses in Highgate. Will and Jem race there and are able to kill her. However, they find out too late that they had fallen into a trap: Mortmain and Nate, who are working together, lured most of the Shadowhunters away from the Institute so they can get their hands on Tessa, and Mortmain, and not de Quincey, is the real identity of the Magister. Jem manages to save the cat meant for the sacrifice.

In the time Will and Jem are gone, Mortmain attacks the Institute with his automatons, killing Thomas and Agatha. When Nate tries to yank her away, Tessa's clockwork angel pendant, a memento from her late mother she brought from New York City, flickers and pushes him away, enabling her to flee, though she is eventually cornered by Mortmain. He reveals that Tessa's father is a demon and he, in a way, is her creator, because he had contacts with her mundane parents that made the conception possible. Mortmain offers Tessa the chance to go with him in exchange for her friends' safety. However, Tessa tricks Mortmain by making him believe that she is committing suicide, forcing him to flee just as Will arrives.

After the funerals, Charlotte informs Tessa to stay at the Institute, despite the latter's belief that she is not welcome after what happened. Tessa attempts to get close to Will, only to be rebuffed harshly, making her storm off in anger. She seeks solace in Jem and retrieves back her clockwork angel. Will visits Magnus, who is waiting for Camille to come out of hiding, and asks him for help.

== Cover ==
The cover features Will Herondale and Tessa's Clockwork Angel charm.

== Sequel ==
The sequel to Clockwork Angel is titled Clockwork Prince. The sequel was released December 2011. The third book in the Infernal Devices series is titled Clockwork Princess; it was released on March 19, 2013.

== Reception ==
On 17 October 2011, Clockwork Angel nabbed the No. 1 spot on YALSA's ‘Teens’ Top 10′ of 2011, beating out the likes of Mockingjay by Suzanne Collins and Crescendo by Becca Fitzpatrick. Clare also made an acceptance video thanking the fans who voted.
