= Richard Rumelt =

American professor (born 1942)

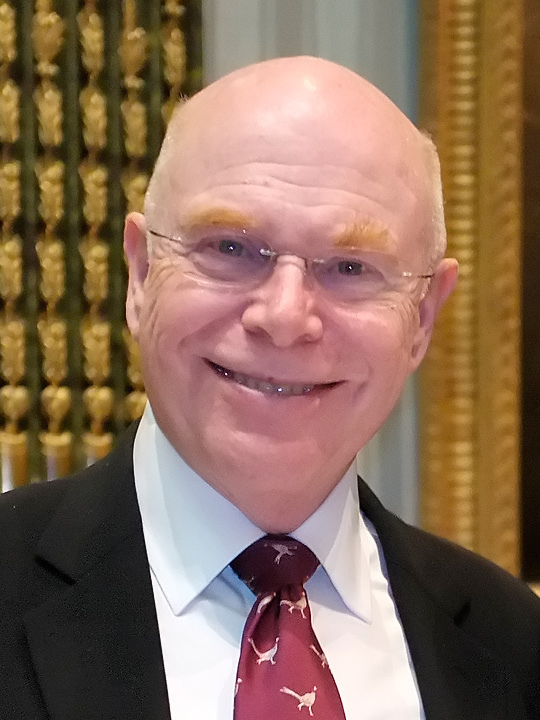
- Rumelt in 2011
- Born: November 10, 1942 (age 83)
- Education: University of California, Berkeley; Harvard Business School
- Occupation: Academic
- Employer: University of California, Los Angeles

Richard Post Rumelt (born November 10, 1942) is an American emeritus professor at the University of California, Los Angeles Anderson School of Management. He joined the school in 1976 from Harvard Business School.

== Academic career ==
Richard Rumelt earned Bachelor's and Master's of Science degrees in Electrical Engineering from UC Berkeley. He worked as a systems design engineer at the Jet Propulsion Laboratory in 1963–65. He received his doctorate from the Harvard Business School in 1972 and joined the Harvard Business School faculty as an assistant professor. On leave from HBS, he helped found and teach at the Iran Center for Management Studies during 1972–74. In 1976 he joined the faculty of Management at the UCLA school of business. In 1993 he was appointed to the Harry and Elsa Kunin Chair in Business and Society. During 1993-96 he taught at INSEAD (France), where he held the Shell Chair in Management.

Rumelt was a founding member of the Strategic Management Society and served as its president in 1995–98.

== Publications ==
Rumelt is noted for having made several key contributions to the study of business and corporate strategy. His 1974 study of diversification strategy inaugurated a stream of work on the performance implications of diversification. In 1980, Rumelt developed a method of evaluating business strategy in which he observed that almost all successful business strategies utilise four common characteristics:

- Consonance - an adaptive response to the business's environment
- Consistency - avoiding mutually inconsistent goals and policies
- Pursuit of a competitive advantage
- Feasibility in how the resources available to the business are utilised.

A joint 1982 paper co-written with Steven Lippman showed how classical industrial organization results—profitability being related to concentration and to market share—could arise under perfect competition if there was uncertainty in the sources of efficiency. This result was key in the development of the "resource-based view" of strategic success. Rumelt's 1991 empirical follow-on (How Much Does Industry Matter?) showed that most of the dispersion of profit rates in the economy was between business units rather than between industries. His 2011 book, Good Strategy, Bad Strategy: The Difference and Why it Matters, redefined strategy as a form of problem solving. It was chosen one of six finalists for the Financial Times & Goldman Sachs Business Book of the Year award for 2011. His book The Crux: How Leaders Become Strategists was published in 2022; it was selected as one of the top business books of 2022 by the Financial Times and by the Globe & Mail.

Good Strategy, Bad Strategy: The Difference and Why it Matters outlines Rumelt's views on the nature of effective strategy. He argues that good strategy involves identifying key facts and problems and then coordinating a focused response. Examples include the Battle of Cannae, where Hannibal used a large-scale troop maneuver to negate the Romans' numerical advantage, and Steve Jobs' second tenure as Apple Inc.'s CEO, where he streamlined product lines to position Apple as a niche computer provider while awaiting new opportunities. However, Rumelt cautions against coordination without purpose, as it can lead to reduced specialization. In contrast, he characterizes bad strategy as often consisting of fluff, excessively complex language, and the conflation of goal-setting with strategy.

Other publications include:

- Rumelt, R. 1974. Strategy, Structure, and Economic Performance, Harvard Business School Press.
- Lippman, S. and Rumelt R . 1982. Uncertain Imitability: An Analysis of Interfirm Differences in Efficiency Under Competition, The Bell Journal of Economics
- Rumelt, R. 1991. How Much Does Industry Matter?, Strategic Management Journal.
- Rumelt, R., Schendel, D., and Teece, D. 1994. Fundamental Issues In Strategy, Harvard Business School Press
- Rumelt, R.P., 1991. How Much Does Industry Matter?. Strategic Management Journal, pp. 167–185.
- Rumelt, R., 2011. The Perils of Bad Strategy. McKinsey Quarterly, 1(3).

For more information see www.thecruxbook.com/press.

== Personal life ==
Rumelt has been married twice. His first wife was Elizabeth; their daughter is American fantasy author Cassandra Clare. He married secondly Kate; the couple enjoys hiking and skiing. They live in Boise, Idaho.
