= Scott Fischer (artist) =

American artist

- Born: 1971 (age 54–55)
- Known for: Fantasy art, children's books

Scott M. Fischer is an American artist whose work has appeared in role-playing games and in children's books.

== Early life ==
Scott Fischer graduated from the Savannah College of Art and Design in 1994.

== Career ==
=== Books and comics ===
Scott Fischer has worked on children's books such as Peter Pan in Scarlet, Secrets of Dripping Fang, The Magisterium Series, Between the Lines, the Scary School series, and Ghost Prison. The first book of The Magisterium Series, The Iron Trial (2014), hit third on the New York Times Middle Grade Bestseller List. In addition to illustrating several children's books, he both wrote and illustrated the book Jump!. Fischer designed the jacket for Perdition, the first book in Ann Aguirre's 2013 Dred Chronicles series from Ace Books.

He is also known for his work on series such as Halo, Harry Potter, Star Wars, Robert Jordan's Wheel of Time. For Star Wars, he provided illustrations for The New Jedi Order Sourcebook (2002) and for Star Wars Art: Visions (2010).

Fischer was a regular cover artist for various Buffy the Vampire Slayer limited series published by Dark Horse Comics. His covers have been included in several "best of" lists such as Comics Alliance's "Best Comic Book Covers Ever (This Month): August 2014", Behind the Panels' "Best Comic Book Covers of January 2015" and Comics Alliance's "The Best Dark Horse Comics Covers of 2016". On his cover for Angel & Faith Season 10 #5, Comics Alliance stated, "Buffy comics are usually so hobbled by the need to honor actor likenesses that they rarely make the cut for me. But last month a Chris Samnee cover won me over, and this month it's a cover by book illustrator Scott Fischer, with a layered mixed media-style painted image that I couldn't resist". On his cover for Angel & Faith: Season 10 #10, Behind the Panels stated "Scott Fischer is not a name we've seen around these parts too much yet, but we hope to see that change this year. He's traditionally known for his role-playing game art, children's books and novel covers, a skill that carries nicely into this fantasy-driven world of Buffy. This stunning cover mixes tribalism with the modern, although it's interesting to note that the more contemporary 'tools of man' are just mere sketches around Faith's waist".

=== Games ===
He is known for his work on Wizards of the Coast's Magic: The Gathering card game and the Dungeons & Dragons role-playing game. His work on Magic started in 1996 and by 2020, Fischer had illustrated over 150 cards. His Dungeons & Dragons work includes the third edition Player's Handbook, Dungeon Master's Guide, and Monster Manual (2000), the Dungeons & Dragons Adventure Game (2000), Monsters of Faerûn (2001), Faiths and Pantheons (2002), City of the Spider Queen (2002), Book of Vile Darkness (2002), Fiend Folio (2003), parts of The Shackled City Adventure Path (2003-2004), and Five Nations (2005). Fischer provided illustrations for the 5th edition Player's Handbook (2014) and created the alternate cover for the upcoming Van Richten's Guide to Ravenloft (2021).

=== Teaching ===
Fischer has been a core faculty member of art teaching programs such as the Illustration Master Class (held at Amherst College but not affiliated with the school) and the SmArt School (an online art mentorship program).

== Personal life ==
Fischer lives in Belchertown, Massachusetts with his wife and daughter.
