= Steven Carstairs =

Scottish radiologist

Steven Carstairs

Lindsay Steven Carstairs FRCR (1919–1998) was a Scottish radiologist. Born in Glasgow, he served in the Royal Army Medical Corps during the Second World War and was present at the D-Day landings. He was associated with the Royal Northern Hospital for most of his career where he became a consultant radiologist. He was a fellow of the British Medical Association and, in retirement, curator of the museum of the Royal College of Radiologists.
