= Clockwork Prince =

2011 book by Cassandra Clare

- First edition
- Author: Cassandra Clare
- Cover artist: Cliff Nielsen
- Language: English
- Series: The Infernal Devices
- Genre: Fantasy, adventure
- Publisher: Margaret K. McElderry Books
- Publication date: December 6, 2011
- Publication place: United States
- Media type: Print, e-book, audio book
- Pages: 502
- ISBN: 978-1-4169-7588-5
- Preceded by: Clockwork Angel
- Followed by: Clockwork Princess

Clockwork Prince is a 2011 novel written by Cassandra Clare. It is the second novel in The Infernal Devices trilogy and is written through the perspective of the protagonist, Tessa Gray, who lives at the London Institute among Shadowhunters, a group of half-angel/half-human beings called Nephilim. After the recent failings of Charlotte, the head of the London Institute, the Council of Shadowhunters begin to question her ability to lead. Now Tessa and her friends must find Mortmain (an evil industrialist bent on destroying all the Nephilim in the world) or risk losing control of the Institute.

The book also contains many quotes referring to famous pieces of Victorian literature, for example, Alfred Tennyson's The Palace of Art, Charles Dickens' A Tale of Two Cities, and the works of Samuel Taylor Coleridge.

A sequel to Clockwork Prince, titled Clockwork Princess, was released on March 19, 2013.

== Plot ==
After the events of the previous book, Charlotte Branwell, accompanied by her husband Henry, Tessa Gray, Will Herondale, Jem Carstairs, and Jessamine Lovelace, are called to a Shadowhunters' Council meeting to give testimony regarding her failure to capture Axel Mortmain, the leader of the Pandemonium Club. Benedict Lightwood, who holds a grudge against Granville Fairchild, Charlotte's father, persuades Consul Wayland to give Charlotte an ultimatum: unless she is able to capture Mortmain within two weeks, she will have to resign as head of the London Institute.

The Institute begins searching for Mortmain and discovers that the Clave killed his adoptive warlock father, John Shade, the creator of the automatons, and mother, Anne, before the Accords were signed. Charlotte suspects that Mortmain began a revenge campaign against the Clave after he unsuccessfully filed for Reparations. She sends Tessa, Will, and Jem to question Aloysius Starkweather of the York Institute, the Shadowhunter who executed Shade. While in York, Will finds out that his family, including his younger sister Cecily, are living in Ravenscar Manor, owned by Mortmain. An automaton attacks the trio and warns Will to stay put unless he wants to see his loved ones killed.

Upon returning to London empty-handed, Will confesses to Magnus Bane that he ran away from home and emotionally shut himself off from everyone to escape a curse caused by a demon he unwittingly released from his father's Pyxis box. The demon told Will that he placed a curse on Will such that all who love him will die, a curse that was reinforced when Will's older sister Ella died the morning after the demon was released. As Will's mental state deteriorates, he stops returning home, and Magnus mails a letter for Tessa to search for him. She and Jem find a drugged Will in an ifrit den and carry him back home. Will explains the next day during breakfast that he found information about werewolves eating yin fen, the drug Jem depends to survive. Upon getting a negative response from Woolsey Scott, head of London's werewolf pack, Charlotte suspects that Mortmain hired rogue werewolves to work on his automatons.

Gideon becomes close with Sophie throughout their training and reveals to Tessa the reason why Benedict hates the Fairchilds: his uncle Silas committed suicide after his forbidden relationship with his parabatai was outed by Granville, leading his mother, Barbara, to die of despair. Sophie steals an invitation to a ball held in the Lightwood manor from Jessamine, giving Tessa the opportunity to attend a ball disguised as her. Accompanied by Will, the two learn that Benedict is in a relationship with a demon, and is conspiring with Mortmain and Nate to bring down Charlotte. At the Manor, Will spots Marbas, the demon who had cursed him, and takes off after him.

Charlotte summons the Silent Brothers to detain Jessamine and interrogate her using the Mortal Sword, after which she is imprisoned in Silent City. After making up to each other, Tessa and Jem reach Jessamine's prison and persuade her to betray Nate by arranging for a meeting. However, Nate figures out the plan and brings an automaton to even out the battle. He tells Tessa that they are actually cousins. Tessa successfully tricks the automaton to turn on Nate and fatally stab him, but Will is gravely injured in the process. Before dying, Nate apologizes to Tessa and tells her to wear her angel pendant no matter what. After Will recovers, he goes to face Marbas. To his shock, Marbas tells Will that there was never any curse, and Ella died simply because she was poisoned by him while defending Will.

Just two days before the deadline to capture Mortmain, Sophie relays Charlotte information she gained from Gideon about the truth of his mother and uncle's deaths: Barbara Lightwood had contracted demon pox from Benedict—thanks to his interaction with demons—and committed suicide because of it, while Silas' suicide had nothing to do with the Fairchild's at all. Charlotte uses this information to blackmail Benedict into dropping his challenge, but Gideon is banished from the Lightwood manor, finding refuge in the London Institute. Will reveals the truth of his curse and confesses his love to Tessa, only for her to tell him that she had accepted Jem's marriage proposal. The two announce their engagement while at the party celebrating Charlotte's acquittal, during which she also reveals that she is pregnant with Henry's child. Out of nowhere, Cecily Herondale (Will's younger sister) visits the Institute and demands that she be trained as a Shadowhunter.

== Reception ==
In The Guardian a reviewer gushed over the book and the author commenting "[t]hank you Cassie for another series that made me more than happy and fulfilled."

In addition Kirkus Reviews writes: "this sequel to Clockwork Angel (2010) pits gorgeous, attractively broken teens against a menacing evil."
