= The Infernal Devices =

Novel trilogy by Cassandra Clare

- Clockwork Angel (2010); Clockwork Prince (2011); Clockwork Princess (2013)
- Author: Cassandra Clare
- Country: London, England
- Language: English
- Genre: Urban fantasy, Paranormal romance, Historical fantasy, Young adult
- Publisher: Simon & Schuster
- Published: August 31, 2010 – March 19, 2013
- Media type: Print (paperback); Audiobook
- No. of books: 3
- Followed by: The Last Hours

The Infernal Devices is a trilogy by author Cassandra Clare, centring on a race called the Shadowhunters introduced in her The Mortal Instruments series. The trilogy is a prequel series to The Mortal Instruments series. Cassandra Clare has stated that the two series are able to be read in any order, but it is best to read them in publication order.

The series follows Tessa Gray, an orphaned teenage girl who discovers she has the power to shape-shift but doesn't bear a Warlock's mark. She is forced to learn how to control this newly established power and navigate the new world she's been thrust into. The series follows Tessa's life as she lives in the London Institute with the Shadowhunters.

The trilogy features William "Will" Herondale, James "Jem" Carstairs, Theresa "Tessa" Gray, and other Downworlders and Shadowhunters. It also features Magnus Bane, Camille Belcourt, and Woolsey Scott and other characters who appear in The Mortal Instruments series.

The books also contain many quotes referring to famous pieces of Victorian Literature like Oscar Wilde's The Importance of Being Earnest, and the works of Samuel Taylor Coleridge and Alfred Tennyson.

== Synopsis ==
The series takes place in London England in 1878, a short time after the peace treaties between Downworlders and Shadowhunters. As Shadowhunters consider themselves superior or purer than Downworlders or demons, they may have no qualms about killing either.

The first book in The Infernal Devices is entitled Clockwork Angel and begins the story of Tessa Gray, an orphan teenage girl who is looking for her brother Nathaniel Gray, who has disappeared, and seeks her true identity.

Her search plunges her into a world she never knew existed and reveals talents she never knew she had. She will have to learn to master them if she wants to find her brother, and must forge an alliance with Shadowhunters if she wants to survive in this dangerous world. Many of the family names of the Shadowhunters used in The Mortal Instruments are first introduced in this series. Another character in The Infernal Devices, Magnus Bane, the High Warlock of Brooklyn, also plays a part in the series.

As Tessa Gray is drawn deeper into the Shadow World, and goes on the quest of finding her brother, she falls in love with two Shadowhunters–but when it comes to choosing one, trouble begins to brew and suspense finds its way into her life. She will have to learn to hide her feelings if she hopes to survive. However, as her heart rages for love but her mind is bent on saving her brother, will she hide her vulnerable side? Which of the Shadowhunters will win her heart?

== Publication history ==
1. Clockwork Angel (August 31, 2010)
2. Clockwork Prince (December 6, 2011)
3. Clockwork Princess (March 19, 2013)

== Characters ==
- Theresa "Tessa" Gray: A 16-year-old girl who has lived most of her life in New York until her brother Nate sends her a ticket to come to England. Upon arrival however, Tessa is taken captive by the Dark Sisters who introduce her own abilities to her, inevitably pulling her into the Shadow World. It is then revealed that Tessa is the daughter of a Greater Demon and a Shadowhunter, Elizabeth Gray (Adele Starkweather); as such, she is a warlock who is able to conceive children. She also has the ability to shapeshift into any person and acquire their memories, manners, and abilities after forming a psychic bond with an object of their possessions. She has grey-blue eyes and wavy brown hair. She loves to read, her favourite novel being "Pride and Prejudice".Tessa is romantically torn between Will Herondale and Jem Carstairs. After Jem becomes a Silent Brother, Tessa marries Will and has two children during their 60-year-marriage, Lucie and James, both of whom would go on to become the ancestors of the Blackthorn and the Herondale families. 70 years after Will's death, Tessa reunites with the now mortal Jem and rekindles their relationship.
- William "Will" Owen or Gwilym Owain Herondale: A 17-year-old Shadowhunter who chose to become a part of the Shadow World at the age of 12. He was born in Wales to a mundane Welsh mother (Linette Herondale née Owens) and an ex-Shadowhunter father (Edmund Herondale), can fluently speak both Welsh and English (along with Greek, Latin and many more languages). Despite being half-mundane, Will is still considered a full shadowhunter since shadowhunter blood is dominant. His parabatai is Jem Carstairs. He is known to have beautiful sapphire eyes and sleek back hair. Will has a dry sense of humour and very serious phobia of ducks which he explains away as the result of an experiment during which he fed poultry to ducks and they ate it without hesitation, causing him to mistrust the "bloodthirsty little beasts". In reality however, ducks painfully remind him of his late sister who helped him to rid himself of a black duck that seemed to have taken offense to a six-year-old Will and bit him on two occasions. All of his direct descendants seem to have inherited this phobia. Similarly, after coming in contact with Tessa's Clockwork Angel, a white star appears on Will's shoulder, and this mark becomes a feature of every Herondale man. Will falls in love with Tessa Gray and cannot stop loving her even when Tessa is engaged to Jem. At the end of the series, Will marries Tessa, having two children, Lucie and James, with her. Jem has to separate from both of them now that he is a Silent Brother, however, when Will dies in 1937 of old age, his family and friends, Tessa, and Jem are all by his side.
- James "Jem" Carstairs or Ke Jian Ming: A 17-year-old Shadowhunter who was forced to live in the London Institute after the slaughter of his parents in the Shanghai Institute. After being physically tortured by a demon who constantly fed him with the highly poisonous demon drug yin fen, Jem became sickly and is deathly dependent upon it. Though the drug is slowly killing him, he is forced to live on it to stay alive. Being half-Chinese (from mother Ke Wen Yu) and half-English (from father Jonah Carstairs), Jem speaks fluent Mandarin. His allegiance is with the Enclave. Jem's parabatai is Will Herondale. He is known to have silver eyes and silver hair: a side-effect from consuming yin fen; however, when he appears healed from the yin fen, Jem is described as having dark brown hair and eyes of Asian descent. Jem falls in love with Tessa and gets engaged with her; however, the engagement falls through when Jem has to turn into a Silent Brother in order to stay alive. In the epilogue, set in 2008, Jem, now a mortal, reunites with Tessa at the Blackfriars Bridge and rekindles their relationship.
- Sophia "Sophie" Collins: Prior to working at the London Institute, Sophie was a parlor maid, working for the Atkins family in St. James Wood. She was very beautiful, therefore, she was offered the job. Sophie's employer's son attempted to seduce her, but she turned him away repeatedly. The son raged out at her, and took and knife and cut open her face, saying if he could not have her, then no one will ever want her again. Sophie went to her mistress but the boy claimed she tried to seduce him, and cut her to protect his virtue. She was thrown on the streets, and Charlotte Branwell then took in Sophie. Sophie was born with 'the Sight', therefore, she could see Charlotte when she was glamoured at the time. At the end of the series, Sophie undergoes Ascension to become a Shadowhunter and marries Gideon Lightwood, having two daughters (Barbara and Eugenia) and one son (Thomas) with him.
- Jessamine "Jessie" Lovelace: Jessamine is a Shadowhunter who detests everything about being a Shadowhunter. Despite loathing the Shadowhunter life and willing to do anything to leave it behind, Jessamine can be dangerous if she wants to be. She lost her parents when she was a child. She is also known to have a dollhouse in her bedroom of the London Institute with "Baby Jessie" as Jessamine calls the doll. She was married to Nate Gray, whom she helped at the expense of the Clave, until his death. For this, Jessie is punished by having her wealth confiscated, but just as she returns to the London Institute, a carriage with automatons attacks the Institute and kills Jessie, who leaves the Clave in her dying breaths that Mortmain is in Cadar Idris, a mountain in Wales. Her ghost returns to protect the Institute.
- Henry Jocelyn Branwell: Absent-minded and brilliant, Henry spends his waking hours in the crypt of the Institute, inventing fabulous machines and weapons out of cogs, cams and gears. Unfortunately just as many of Henry's inventions do not work as the ones that do, and Henry is as likely to set himself on fire as he is to invent something new and amazing. He invented the portal with the help of one magnificent warlock, Magnus Bane. He becomes crippled after a demonic automaton attacks and almost kills him. At the end of the series, Henry takes Charlotte's maiden name, Fairchild, and has two sons with her: Charles and Matthew.
- Charlotte Mary Branwell (née Fairchild): 23-year-old Charlotte, wife of Henry Branwell, runs the entire Institute with a capable hand. Kind and loving, she does her best to care for the orphaned Shadowhunters who live under her roof whilst hiding her loneliness from the absent-minded husband she loves. It seems as if there is nothing Charlotte cannot manage — until Tessa's search for her missing brother begins to uncover a web of corruption and deceit in London's Downworld that threatens to tear London's Enclave of Shadowhunters apart. At the end of the series, Charlotte reverts to using her maiden name and has two sons (Charles and Matthew) who inherit their mother's maiden name.
- Axel Mortmain: The antagonist of this series, he is the one responsible for the clockwork creatures. He plots to destroy all Shadowhunters to avenge his warlock parents. He is a very dangerous man, and he needs Tessa Gray for the last key to his mischievous plan to overrule the Shadowhunters. He is later known to have "created" Tessa to prove that a half-demon, half-shadowhunter warlock is naturally better than a normal shadowhunter. He is killed at the end of the series by the spirit of Ithuriel summoned by Tessa.
- Magnus Bane: An ancient warlock whose origins reside in Indonesia. He is flamboyant, but also wise. Early on, he has a romantic relationship with a vampire, Camille Belcourt. Magnus is a friend of Will Herondale, and aids him - and the other Shadowhunters - with various problems they encounter throughout the series. Magnus was said to take a liking towards Will Herondale.
- Camille Belcourt: A vampire and a lover of Magnus Bane. She is also acquainted with Alexei de Quincey, but vows to take revenge against him when he killed her lover, a werewolf named Ralf Scott. Tessa disguises as her, with Will accompanying her as her "subjugate", during a ball held by de Quincey, but Camille is forced to go on the run when the commotion kills almost all vampires in the area. She returns home after a brief stay in Saint Petersburg, but Magnus is disappointed that Camille does not love him the way she did before and he decides to break up with her, kissing Will as proof.
- Benedict Lightwood: A demon-crazy shadowhunter, Benedict comes from the wealthy Lightwood family and expected himself to be elevated to the position of the head of the London Institute, but was furious when Charlotte took the job and vowed to bring her down. He allies himself with Axel Mortmain in exchange for medicine that heals his demon pox that slowly turns him into a demonic worm. When his son, Gideon, learns about this, he betrays his father and defects to the London Institute. Benedict's other son, Gabriel follows suit and kills his father after the latter has fully changed into a worm. All this turns the Lightwood family into a laughing stock in the Shadow World and their prestige is only brought back by his well-behaved sons.
- Gabriel Lightwood: The second son of Benedict and Barbara Lightwood, Gabriel was raised by his father believing that breaking the rules of the Law is the right thing to do, as with his siblings. He holds resentment towards Will Herondale ever since the latter humiliated his sister, Tatiana, and broke his arm when he went emotional. When his father instructs his sons to train Tessa, Sophie, and Jessie, Gabriel chooses to train Tessa hands-on, mainly to irritate Will. Unlike his brother, Gideon, Gabriel is quite loyal to his father and stays by his side when the truth about his alliance with Mortmain is revealed. However, when Benedict turns into a demonic worm as a result of his demon pox, Gabriel deals the killing blow when he realizes that his father is not himself anymore. At the end of Clockwork Princess, Gabriel begins to get along well with Will while also marrying the latter's sister, Cecily Herondale, having two sons (Christopher and Alexander) and one daughter (Anna) with her.
- Nathaniel "Nate" Gray: Nate Gray is introduced as Tessa's older brother who invites her to come to England to join him after their aunt, Harriet's death. Tessa learns from the Dark Sisters that Nate has been kidnapped and will be killed if she does not agree to use her powers. Eventually, Nate is rescued from Alexei de Quincey and brought to the London Institute for questioning. However, it is revealed that Nate has been in league with Axel Mortmain, the true "Magister", all along, and betrays Tessa by giving her to Mortmain, though she is able to fake her death. In Clockwork Prince, Jessie becomes smitten by Nate and is manipulated by him to betray the Institute and provide information for him and Mortmain. At the end of the book, Nate reveals that he and Tessa are only cousins since Harriet is Nate's actual mother, while the following book, Clockwork Princess, reveals that the two have never been related, since Tessa's mother, "Elizabeth Gray", was really Adele Starkweather, a Shadowhunter switched by the faeries with Nate's true aunt, Elizabeth Moore. Nate is killed when he is struck by sharp metal from automatons that explode with Henry's inventions.
- Alexei de Quincey: A powerful vampire leading the London vampire clan, de Quincey is suspected as "the Magister" and the head of the Pandemonium Club. He was once acquainted with Camille Belcourt, but the relationship ended when he killed Ralf Scott, Camille's werewolf lover, after which both Camille and Ralf's brother, Woolsey, swore revenge against him. Mortmain uses him as a distraction while he infiltrates the London Institute to capture Tessa. When the Shadowhunters meet with de Quincey, he is only barely guarded and laughs at them for falling to Mortmain's trick. He is then killed by Benedict Lightwood.
- Gideon Lightwood: The eldest son of Benedict and Barbara, and the older brother of Gabriel and Tatiana, Gideon is the one most skeptical about his father's teachings and is even embarrassed when he learns that all that his father taught to him about flouting the Law is wrong. He becomes an instructor for the new Shadowhunters at the London Institute and becomes close to the mundane maid, Sophie. Eventually, he betrays his father in favor of Sophie and the Institute, telling them about his father's dealings with Mortmain. At the end of the series, Gideon marries Sophie and has three children (Barbara, Eugenia, and Thomas) with her. He and Gabriel also bring back his family's reputation after Benedict plunged them due to his antics.
- Cecily Herondale: Will's younger sister whom he left alongside their parents after accidentally causing their older sister, Ella's death when he was 12 years old. Even if years had passed, Cecily is still remembered by Will; her name is what he says when he is recovering from vampire blood, though Tessa mistakes her as someone Will once dated. In turn, Cecily also misses her brother terribly and is relieved when Ragnor Fell does not deny that he visits the Herondale residence on Will's behalf. Eventually, Cecily becomes a Shadowhunter, at first to convince Will to return home, but later because she realizes that the world which she taught was dangerous is actually challenging and enjoyable. At the end of Clockwork Princess, Cecily marries Gabriel Lightwood and has three children (Anna, Christopher, and Alexander) with him.
- Aloysius Starkweather: A grumpy old Shadowhunter, Aloysius Starkweather has been the leader of the York Institute for many years. He holds deep resentment towards Downworlders, especially when it was discovered that his granddaughter, Adele, was switched by the faeries and replaced by a sickly mundane girl who went insane and died while receiving her Marks. He also does not get along well with Charlotte Branwell due to a disagreement he had with her father, but Charlotte has no choice but get his help for a lead to Mortmain. In Clockwork Princess, it is revealed that Aloysius' granddaughter, who was switched as the faerie's revenge for their killings, was Elizabeth Gray, Tessa's mother, making Tessa a half-Shadowhunter. Aloysius is killed by the automatons during a Clave meeting, right after he realizes that he should have listened to Charlotte.
- Woolsey Scott: A werewolf who leads both the London werewolf clan and the Praetor Lupus, which he created in memory of his brother, Ralf, who was killed by Alexei de Quincey for continuing his relationship with Camille Belcourt. He becomes satisfied with de Quincey's death and informs the London Institute that Mortmain is purchasing the entire stock of the yin fen medication, meaning that Jem's life is in danger. Later, Woolsey begins a relationship with Magnus Bane after the latter breaks up with Camille by the time Will and Tessa visit him to request Magnus more yin fen. Woolsey suspects that Tessa is a fey, though she is actually both a warlock and a shadowhunter. At the end of Clockwork Princess, Woolsey and Magnus have broken off their relationship, though Woolsey gives him a silver snuffbox before leaving.

== Reception ==
The first volume of the original English-language manga adaptation made it to The New York Times Manga Best Seller list for the week of October 28–November 3, 2012.

== Adaptations ==
Cassandra Clare has confirmed that "The Infernal Devices has been optioned as a film project by the same people who optioned The Mortal Instruments along with the Walt Disney Pictures."

It was announced in May 2020 that The Infernal Devices will be adapted into a TV series for BBC Three.
