= The Mortal Instruments =

Series of fantasy novels by Cassandra Clare

- City of Bones (2007); City of Ashes (2008); City of Glass (2009); City of Fallen Angels (2011); City of Lost Souls (2012); City of Heavenly Fire (2014)
- Author: Cassandra Clare
- Cover artist: Cliff Nielsen
- Country: United States
- Language: English
- Genre: Urban fantasy, Contemporary fantasy, Paranormal romance, Young adult
- Publisher: Margaret K. McElderry (US); Walker Books (UK, Australia, New Zealand); Destino (Spain); Arena Verlag (Germany); Universal Poche (France)
- Published: March 27, 2007 – May 27, 2014
- Media type: Print (hardcover and paperback); Audiobook
- Preceded by: The Last Hours
- Followed by: The Dark Artifices

The Mortal Instruments is a series of six young adult fantasy novels written by American author Cassandra Clare, the last of which was published on May 27, 2014. The Mortal Instruments is chronologically the third series of a planned six in The Shadowhunter Chronicles but was the first one published. It follows Clary Fray, whose chance encounter with a group of elite angelic superhuman beings—known as Nephilim or Shadowhunters—leads her to make life-changing discoveries about herself and her family history. The mission of the Shadowhunters is to protect the world of human people, also called mundanes or "mundies," from dark forces beyond their world. A recurring theme throughout all Shadowhunters Chronicles books is that "all the stories are true"—and as a result, many creatures popularized in fantasy writing (e.g., vampires, werewolves, faeries, warlocks, etc.) play a role in the books. The book series falls under the young adult genre, specifically the paranormal romance/urban fantasy and supernatural genres.

== Novels ==
1. City of Bones (March 27, 2007)
2. City of Ashes (March 25, 2008)
3. City of Glass (March 23, 2009)
4. City of Fallen Angels (April 5, 2011)
5. City of Lost Souls (May 8, 2012)
  - The Shadowhunter's Codex (October 29, 2013)
6. City of Heavenly Fire (May 27, 2014)
  - The Bane Chronicles (Print Edition November 11, 2014)
  - Tales from the Shadowhunter Academy (Print Edition November 15, 2016)
  - Ghosts of the Shadow Market (June 4, 2019)

== Main characters ==
- Clarissa Adele "Clary" Fray/Fairchild is the daughter of Jocelyn Fairchild. Clary is an artist, a student, and a presumed mundane (human). The inciting event of The Mortal Instruments is that Clary learns that she is a Shadowhunter, a secret her mother kept to protect her. Later in the series, readers learn that she is also the daughter of Valentine Morgenstern and the sister of Jonathan Christopher (Sebastian) Morgenstern. Clary is gifted with the ability to create runes, because her father administered angel blood to her while she was in the womb as an experiment. Clary described as being stubborn and impulsive. Her best friend is Simon and she is romantically involved with Jace.
- Jonathan Christopher "Jace" Herondale (also referred to as Wayland, Morgenstern, and Lightwood) is a Shadowhunter, and among their best fighters. Jace is often flirty and insensitive, due to insecurity. Jace's biological family was unknown until the last few books, although he was raised by the Lightwood family at the New York Institute, and so he often refers to Isabelle, Alec, and Max as his siblings, and Maryse and Robert Lightwood as his parents. He was raised by Valentine Morgenstern, who was assuming the identity of Michael Wayland at the time. He eventually learns that his biological father was Stephen Herondale. Like Clary, he has special abilities which make him swift and graceful, caused by the extra angel blood he received while in his mother's womb. His parabatai is Alec Lightwood, and he is romantically involved with Clary.
- Simon Lewis (also referred to as Lovelace) is a teenage boy who describes himself as being a "hipster," though his best friend, Clary, calls him a "geek". Simon is Jewish, was raised by a single mother, and is in a band with his mundane friends. Simon began life as an ordinary human (called a mundane), but in City of Ashes was transformed into a vampire. After becoming a vampire, he didn't age and physically remained 16 years old. At the end of The Mortal Instruments, Simon makes a deal with a demon to trade his immortality and memories away so that he and his friends can escape Edom, a hellish demon realm. After this trade, Simon becomes human again, with no conscious memories of the Shadow World or any of his friends. Eventually, his friends realize that he still has some faint memories of the Shadow World, and they encourage him to train to become a Shadowhunter, a journey explored in depth in the Tales from the Shadowhunter Academy partner short story collection. His best friend (and, later, Parabatai) is Clary, and he is romantically involved with Izzy.
- Isabelle "Izzy" Sophia Lightwood is a Shadowhunter that is described as very beautiful, very girly, and very fierce. She carries a gold electrum whip. She is flirty and cannot hold a serious relationship, often finding herself in flings with people her parents would not approve of (like faeries and other Downworlders). Eventually, she becomes interested in Simon Lewis. In City of Lost Souls, she admits to being in love with Simon and in City of Heavenly Fire she becomes Simon's girlfriend.
- Alexander "Alec" Gideon Lightwood is the oldest Lightwood sibling. His weapon of choice is a bow and arrow. Though he is an impressive warrior, Alec has never killed a demon. He is described as quiet but protective of his younger siblings, Isabelle and Max, the latter of whom dies in City of Glass. In the first book, City of Bones, Alec believes he is in love with Jace, his best friend and parabatai. But later, Alec starts a secret relationship with Magnus Bane. In City of Glass, Alec kisses Magnus in front of his parents, revealing to them that he is gay. Alec later becomes insecure about his and Magnus' relationship because of Magnus' immortality and considerable romantic history. This leads him to consider turning Magnus into a mortal against his will, which causes Magnus to end their relationship in City of Lost Souls. However, Magnus and Alec eventually reconcile in City of Heavenly Fire.
- Magnus Bane is the self-described freewheeling bisexual High Warlock of Brooklyn. Magnus is an approximately 800-year-old warlock who appears to be 19. Magnus Bane is often described as glittery. In The Mortal Instruments, Magnus helped Jocelyn, Clary's mom, erase Clary's memories of the Shadow World. Magnus began a relationship with Alec Lightwood that is the focus of the series The Eldest Curses. Magnus also appears in the prequel series The Infernal Devices and The Last Hours, the sequel series The Dark Artifices, as well as the anthology of short stories titled The Bane Chronicles describing some of the major events that occurred in his life before the events of The Mortal Instruments. He is one of the only characters who is mentioned in all of the main Shadowhunters Chronicles books. His parents are an unnamed Indonesian woman and the greater demon Asmodeus.
- Lucian "Luke" Garroway/Graymark is a former Shadowhunter and the former second-in-command of the Circle. When he was younger he was best friends and parabatai with Valentine. However he was soon betrayed by Valentine who led him into a trap where he was bitten by a werewolf, causing him to become one. He was the leader of the Manhattan werewolf pack, preceded by Maia Roberts. He becomes engaged to Jocelyn Fairchild, Clary's mother. He is described as calm, level-headed and righteous. He is fiercely loyal to his loved ones.
- Jocelyn Fray/Fairchild is a Shadowhunter, a former member of the circle, and the mother of Clary and Jonathan Christopher Morgenstern. In Idris, the Shadowhunter home country, she was married to Valentine but following the birth of their first child, Jonathan, she learned that Valentine had been experimenting on her, mixing demon blood into her food and thus making Jonathan a monster. Valentine performed a similar experiment using angel blood when Jocelyn was pregnant with Clary. After Valentine faked his and Jonathan's deaths, Jocelyn left Idris and moved to Brooklyn where she gave birth to Clary. Every two years Jocelyn had Magnus Bane cast a block on Clary's "Sight" to prevent her from seeing the Shadow world. Jocelyn is secretly in possession of the Mortal Cup, one of the titular Mortal Instruments needed to raise the angel Raziel or to make new Shadowhunters. In City of Bones she self-induces a coma to prevent Valentine learning the whereabouts of the Mortal Cup. She is reawakened in City of Glass. She eventually becomes engaged to Luke, who she has been friends with since living in Idris. Her current surname, Fray is revealed to be a portmanteau of her initial maiden name, Fairchild, and that of Tessa Gray, a warlock seen in City of Heavenly Fire, and who is the protagonist of the prequel series, The Infernal Devices.
- Valentine Morgenstern is Clary and Jonathan Christopher Morgenstern's biological father, and is Jace Herondale's adoptive father. He is the main antagonist for the first three books of the series. He was Parabatai with Luke before Luke became a werewolf. Valentine faked his own death prior to the events of The Mortal Instruments. While raising Jace, he assumed the identity of Michael Wayland, a Shadowhunter who he had actually killed years earlier.
- Jonathan Christopher (Sebastian) Morgenstern is Clary's brother, and the main antagonist of books 5 and 6. Like Clary, he is a Shadowhunter, but he was born with demon blood in his veins. It was administered to him by his father, Valentine, while his mother, Jocelyn, was pregnant. At the end of City of Heavenly Fire the evil was burnt out of him. He died soon after admitting to and apologizing for his wrongdoings to Clary and their mother.

== Critical reception ==
City of Bones was popular at the time of release, reaching #8 on the New York Times Best Seller list (Children's books) in April 2007. City of Ashes was one of the YALSA's top ten teen books for 2009.

Publishers Weekly commented that it "is a sprawling urban fantasy packed with just about every type of creature known to the genre". Locus praised the book as "a highly readable first novel". Booklist said that there was "plenty of romance, loss, honor, and betrayal to make the journey worthwhile. An experienced storyteller, Clare moves the plot quickly to a satisfying end." School Library Journal said "Though the story is hampered by predictability and overblown writing, Clare continues her talent for mixing hip, modern humor with traditional fantasy, and fans eagerly awaiting the series conclusion should come away more than satisfied." A review in the School Library Journal noted that the book contained a variety of narrative flaws including characters that were "sporadically characterized" and whose behavior was predictable. In spite of this they noted that the book was entertaining and would leave readers anticipating the next installment. The series has been in the New York Times Best Sellers List for 102 consecutive weeks as of September 5, 2013, and No. 1 for 9 weeks straight, knocking series such as The Hunger Games and Percy Jackson and The Olympians off the top spot. The last time The Mortal Instruments spent 100 consecutive weeks on the best sellers list was in May 2012. On August 29, 2013, City of Bones topped the USA Today's Best Sellers List, which made it the Best Seller Book of the country at the time. Four other Mortal Instruments books also made the list. City of Ashes was No. 8, City of Glass was No. 20, City of Fallen Angels was 35 and City of Lost Souls was No. 46.

== Popular culture and historical references ==
In City of Ashes, the Faerie Realm and its inhabitants are characters from Holly Black's faerie series, beginning with Tithe: A Modern Faerie Tale. Also, the characters Val and Luis from Valiant: A Modern Tale of Faerie appear in another scene in that book. Within Holly Black's third book, Ironside: A Modern Faery's Tale, there is a reference to the Mortal Cup mentioned in The Mortal Instruments series.

Clare delved deeply into world mythology in order to build the Shadowhunter world featured in The Mortal Instruments, The Infernal Devices, and all other offshoots of the series. There are strong influences from Paradise Lost and The Inferno; while there are many references to Western religious mythology, Clare also studied world mythology deeply, specifically demonic myth featured in Japanese, Tibetan, and other Eastern cultural texts. Her references to angels and nephilim throughout the series also come from this study of world religions and folklore. These myths were then adapted to fit into her stories.

== Further books in the series ==
=== Prequels ===
Cassandra Clare has written a series of prequels called The Infernal Devices set in the same universe as The Mortal Instruments, but in Victorian London. This series consists of three books: Clockwork Angel, published on August 31, 2010, Clockwork Prince, published December 6, 2011, and Clockwork Princess, published March 19, 2013. The main characters in this series are Will Herondale, Tessa Gray, and Jem Carstairs, who reside in the London Institute.

There is a sequel series to The Infernal Devices called The Last Hours set in the same universe detailing the adventures of the next generation of Shadowhunters almost two decades after the events of Clockwork Princess. The series consists of three books: Chain of Gold, Chain of Iron, and Chain of Thorns.

=== Sequels ===
The Dark Artifices is a sequel trilogy set in the same universe as The Mortal Instruments, but five years in the future. The first book, Lady Midnight, was published on March 8, 2016. The second book, Lord of Shadows was released on May 23, 2017. The third and final book, Queen of Air and Darkness was published on December 4, 2018.

=== Anthology compilation of novellas ===
Cassandra Clare, Sarah Rees Brennan and Maureen Johnson have written a complementary series of ten short stories called The Bane Chronicles that recount the experiences of the Warlock Magnus Bane character from The Mortal Instruments series. This series has been published over the course of 2013 and 2014 and consists of "What Really Happened in Peru", "The Runaway Queen", "Vampires, Scones, and Edmund Herondale", "The Midnight Heir", "The Rise of the Hotel Dumort", "Saving Raphael Santiago", "The Fall of The Hotel Dumort", "What to Buy the Shadowhunter Who Has Everything (And Who You're Not Officially Dating Anyway)", "The Last Stand of the New York Institute", and "The Course of True Love (and First Dates)".

Cassandra Clare and Sarah Rees Brennan also wrote a series of books called Tales from the Shadowhunter Academy that are focused on the character of Simon Lewis, Clary's best friend and Isabelle's boyfriend as he journeys to become a Shadowhunter. The series consists of ten books that have been released over the course of 2015. The books and release dates are: Welcome to Shadowhunter Academy, February 17; The Lost Herondale, March 17; The Whitechapel Fiend, April 21; Nothing but Shadows, May 19; The Evil We Love, June 16; Pale Kings and Princes, July 21; Bitter of Tongue, August 18; The Fiery Trial, September 15; Born to Endless Night, October 20; and Angels Twice Descending, November 17.

In addition, Cassandra Clare and Sarah Rees Brennan edited a side book titled Ghosts of the Shadow Market. The book contains 10 stories of the Mortal Instrument characters, The Infernal Devices characters, The Dark Artifices characters, and The Last Hours characters. The titles of the stories are "Son of Dawn", "Cast Long Shadows", "Every Exquisite Thing", "Learn About Loss", "A Deeper Love", "The Wicked Ones", "The Land I Lost", "Through Blood", "Through Fire", "The Lost World", Forever Fallen.

== Adaptations ==
=== Graphic novels ===
The City of Bones, The Clockwork Angel, The Clockwork Prince, and The Clockwork Princess have all been released in graphic novel form by Th3rd World Publishing.

=== Film ===
In 2010, Screen Gems announced that it would produce a film adaptation of City of Bones, the first book in The Mortal Instruments series, with hopes of starting a film franchise. The film premiered on August 12, 2013, at the Cinerama Dome in Hollywood. Production of a film adaptation of the second book, City of Ashes, was due to start in September 2013, but was delayed to 2014, and eventually cancelled, after the first film failed to recoup its budget.

=== Television ===
Constantin Film announced on October 12, 2014, that The Mortal Instruments would be reintroduced as a television series. The show ran for three seasons, with a total of 55 episodes, beginning on January 12, 2016, and ending on May 6, 2019.

A graphic novel based on the first book was released to coincide with the series premiere.

On October 12, 2014, at Mipcom, Constantin confirmed that The Mortal Instruments would return as a television series with Ed Decter as showrunner. Constantin Film and TV head Martin Moszkowicz told The Hollywood Reporter that, "It actually makes sense to do [the novels] as a TV series. There was so much from the book that we had to leave out of the Mortal Instruments film. In the series we'll be able to go deeper and explore this world in greater detail and depth." The producers hoped to adapt the entire book series. In February 2015, book series author Cassandra Clare announced via Twitter that the television series would be called Shadowhunters rather than The Mortal Instruments. In March 2015, ABC Family picked up Shadowhunters straight-to-series. The series was renewed for a second season in March 2016, consisting of 20 episodes, which premiered on January 2, 2017. In April 2017, it was announced that the series was renewed for a third season of 20 episodes. The first half of ten episodes premiered on March 20, 2018, while the second aired in mid-2018. The two-part series finale aired on May 6, 2019.
