= The Darkest Part of the Forest =

2015 novel written by Holly Black

- First edition
- Author: Holly Black
- Cover artist: Michael O
- Language: English
- Genre: Fantasy
- Publisher: Little Brown Books for Young Readers
- Publication date: January 13, 2015
- Publication place: United States
- ISBN: 978-0-316-21305-9

The Darkest Part of the Forest is a 2015 young adult fantasy novel written by Holly Black. The book is a standalone but makes mention of characters from Black's Modern Tale of Faerie trilogy, establishing a shared continuity between that trilogy as well as the Folk of the Air series of books.

The Guardian reviewed the book as "Holly successfully merges modern teenage life with faerie legends and creates characters that have real depth that you care about. Even when describing the most mythical sections, the writing is really grounded and feels real".

The story centers around teenager Hazel and her brother, Ben, who live in a small town where humans live with a variety of mythical creatures. Normal life in the town is disrupted when a glass coffin in the woods, which has held a sleeping horned boy for decades, is shattered, and Hazel suspects she is responsible.
