= City of Bones =

City of Bones may refer to:

- City of Bones (Connelly novel), a novel by American crime author Michael Connelly
- City of Bones (Clare novel), a 2007 young adult novel by Cassandra Clare
  - The Mortal Instruments: City of Bones, the film adaptation of Clare's novel
- City of Bones, a 1995 novel by Martha Wells
