= City of Bones (Clare novel) =

2007 fantasy novel by Cassandra Clare

- First edition cover for the book "City of Bones."
- Author: Cassandra Clare
- Cover artist: Cliff Nielsen
- Language: English
- Series: The Mortal Instruments
- Genre: Fantasy adventure Urban fantasy
- Set in: New York, August 2007
- Publisher: Margaret K. McElderry
- Publication date: March 27, 2007 (U.S.); July 2, 2007 (UK)
- Publication place: United States
- Media type: Print (Hardback & Paperback)
- Pages: 485 pp (Hardback, First Edition); 512 pp (Paperback)
- ISBN: 978-1-4169-5507-8
- Followed by: City of Ashes

City of Bones is the first urban fantasy book in author Cassandra Clare's New York Times bestselling series The Mortal Instruments. The novel, first published in 2007, is set in modern-day New York City and has been released in several languages, including Bulgarian, Hebrew, Polish and Japanese. It is the first book in the first trilogy of The Mortal Instruments which includes the books City of Ashes and City of Glass.

== Plot ==
Clary goes to the Pandemonium club with her best friend, Simon Lewis, and sees a blue-haired boy sneak into a storeroom with a girl, pursued by two other boys, one armed with what appears to be a knife. Clary sends Simon for help and follows the group. At the storeroom, she witnesses the boy being killed, before vanishing. Simon later appears with a bouncer and asks why Clary is there alone; she realizes no one else can see the others.

The next day, her mother Jocelyn announces they are moving from New York to the country for the summer, where her friend, Luke, has a house. Clary, who knows almost nothing about her mother or her family, is upset by the decision. Simon mentions seeing thin, white scars on Jocelyn's back and shoulders, but Clary dismisses this. The two friends go to a poetry reading where Clary sees Jace, one of the boys from the previous night, who privately tells her about demon-hunters, called Shadowhunters or Nephilim. Jace claims Clary is not a "mundane", a term for ordinary humans, as she has the Sight, allowing her to see beings from the Shadow World. Clary answers a call from Jocelyn, who frantically warns her not to come home and to tell Luke that "he" has found her. It ends abruptly.

Clary returns to her house, which is in disarray, and finds her mother gone. She is attacked by a demon, which she kills with Jace's Sensor. Jace brings Clary to the "Institute": the local headquarters of the Shadowhunters, where she is introduced to Isabelle, Alec, and their tutor, Hodge. Jace proves that Clary has Nephilim blood by touching her with a stele, which leaves her unharmed. All Nephilim are unharmed by steles, weapons used to mark Shadowhunters with angelic runes that give them their powers.

Returning to the house, Jace and Clary meet neighbour Madame Dorothea, who has a teleportation portal. To find her mother, Clary, followed by Jace, rushes through the portal. They land at Luke's bookstore and find Simon, in search of Clary. The three hide. Luke returns with two men, Pangborn and Blackwell, whom Valentine Morgenstern sent to interrogate Luke about the Mortal Cup: a talisman sought by both parties. Luke claims ignorance of where Jocelyn hid the Cup and refuses to negotiate with them or interfere with Valentine's plans.

Clary, Jace and Simon then talk to Hodge, who tells them about the Circle: a group of Shadowhunters that Valentine formed to eliminate all Downworlders, which Jocelyn, Valentine's wife, joined when she was younger. Clary is actually Valentine's daughter. Alongside Jocelyn, Alec and Isabelle's parents also used to be Circle Members; Luke was also a member and was a Shadowhunter and the parabatai - one half of a sacred bond between Shadowhunters - of Valentine.

Clary and Jace go to the Silent City to speak to the Silent Brothers, who tell them that a block in her mind prevents her from remembering the Shadow World; placed by warlock Magnus Bane.

At a party hosted by Magnus, Clary meets him. He says his spell is too complex to remove but will fade naturally and was placed at the behest of Jocelyn for Clary's protection. During the party, Simon ignores Isabelle's warning and drinks a blue liquid that transforms him into a rat. Vampires take him away thinking Simon was one of their own, but Clary and Jace rescue him and restore him to human form. That night, Jace takes Clary to the Institute's greenhouse on a midnight picnic to celebrate Clary's sixteenth birthday, where he kisses her. When Simon walks in on them, she pulls away. Hurt, Jace acts coldly towards her.

As her memories emerge, Clary deduces that the Cup is hidden magically in one of Madame Dorothea's tarot cards. Clary retrieves the Cup, but the demon Abaddon, who has possessed Madame Dorothea and is disguised as her, attempts to take it. Aided by Simon, she escapes and returns to the Institute where Hodge hands over the Cup and an unconscious Jace to Valentine. Hodge flees, pursued by Clary. Hodge attacks her in an alleyway, but she is saved by Luke, who is a werewolf. While Luke's werewolf pack attacks Valentine's followers at Renwick's, Clary locates her unconscious mother and finds Jace. Valentine identifies him as his son; dismaying both Jace and Clary, who were attempting to enter into a romantic relationship. Valentine entices Jace to return to Idris - their home country - with him. Jace refuses, and Valentine escapes through a portal with the Cup, smashing it behind him.

Jace and Clary are honored for their adventure and Alec recovers with the help of Magnus Bane.

== Characters ==
- Clarissa Adele "Clary" Fray/Fairchild/Morgenstern
  She is a little over 5 feet tall, thin, has bright red hair, green eyes, and freckles, and is described as looking nearly identical to her mother; they are both also described to have small chests and small hips. Clary describes herself as less attractive than Isabelle, as well as flat-chested. Clary grew up oblivious to the Shadow World and her real heritage. Jocelyn, her mother, believed that Clary should have a normal human life to shield her from Jocelyn's past. She raised Clary in New York. Clary is an artist, like her mother, often drawing her emotions in pictures - her version of a diary. She lives a very typical teenage life until her mother is kidnapped. Throughout the first trilogy, Clary embarks on a quest to help her mother while adjusting to life as a Shadowhunter. She and Jace eventually develop a mutual attraction; although the revelation that they are siblings dashes their romantic hopes.
- Jonathan Christopher "Jace" Wayland/Morgenstern
  At the age of 10, Jace was orphaned because his father was murdered by members of the Circle. This is eventually proven to be a farce, as the man who raised him proves to still be alive. He was then sent to the New York Institute to live with the Lightwoods and Hodge Starkweather. There, he trained alongside Isabelle and Alec Lightwood. He views Isabelle as his sister, and he and Alec have a sacred parabatai bond. Jace grew up to be cold and arrogant to those around him. He rejected the idea of love and only believes in the art of war. Before the death of his father, Jace was brutally trained to be an expert in the arts of war. He was said to be the best Shadowhunter of his age. He often acts sarcastic and sassy. He cares a lot about his adoptive siblings. Jace is described as having golden hair, eyes, and skin. He is attracted to Clary but becomes horrified after discovering that they might be siblings.
- Simon Lewis
  Clary's human best friend and essentially only friend for about 10 years. Simon only has three main interests; his band, keeping up with everything nerdy, and Clary. He is secretly in love with Clary, though she does not appear to reciprocate those feelings and is oblivious to them until he directly tells her. He is jealous that Clary shows a larger amount of affection for Jace than himself. He does not shy away from expressing his dislike for Jace. His loyalty to Clary is unwavering, even after discovering the relationship that Clary and Jace begin to grow, Simon stays by Clary. He is described as a tall slender 16-year-old boy with black shaggy hair and brown eyes. He also wears glasses. He has an older sister and a single mother; his father died a few years ago.
- Isabelle Sophia "Izzy" Lightwood
  She is described as tall and incredibly beautiful, with black hair and eyes. However, she is also still a teenage girl. She is the daughter of Robert and Maryse Lightwood and sister to Max and Alexander Lightwood. Isabelle's priorities are family, The Clave, and herself. She is determined to be strong and fight whomever to obtain what she wants. She is ruthless when it comes to protecting her family. She often uses her beauty as a weapon. On the surface she may seem like she is self-absorbed; however, throughout the novel, she grows into a much more complex character. It is also evident in the first book that she does not share her family's or Shadowhunters' prejudices towards Downworlders, as she enters into a relationship with the fairy Meliorn and befriends Magnus.
- Alexander Gideon "Alec" Lightwood
  Alec is the eldest son of the Lightwoods; therefore, he carries much of the responsibility of the siblings. Having just become an adult, Alec was expected to take care of his siblings and look over the Institute while his parents are away. Throughout the book, he is constantly struggling with what is right by his family and friends and what is right by the law. Alec's self-esteem was very low at the beginning of the novel, which makes him lash out at Clary. He has black hair and blue eyes. Alec is gay but is afraid to come out due to the stigma of other Shadowhunters. However, Clary confronts him about the fact that he is gay, and Isabelle reveals she also knew. Alec claims to be in love with Jace, this is because Jace is a safe option since parabatai are not legally allowed to be in relationships. He is also jealous of Clary because of Jace's affection for her. There are scenes indicating the budding relationship between Alec and the warlock Magnus Bane.
- Luke Garroway/Lucian Graymark
  Once a Shadowhunter and a former member of the Circle, a group started by Valentine Morgenstern. He is Jocelyn's best friend and seems to be in love with her, though he has yet to declare it. Because of his close relationship with Jocelyn, Clary considers him a father figure. Luke became a werewolf when Valentine betrayed him. He has since become a pack leader twice. He owns a bookstore in New York which is directly connected to Dorothea's teleportation portal. He and his pack attack Valentine's stronghold in Renwick's while Clary searches for her mother. He is Valentine's parabatai.
- Valentine Morgenstern
  A powerful, evil Shadowhunter, he reappears after years in hiding, during which he was presumed dead. His mission is to rid the world of Downworlders and turn Mundanes, willingly or not, into Shadowhunters although the process may kill them. He attempts to steal the Mortal Cup from his former wife, Jocelyn. He tells Jace and Clary that they are both his and Jocelyn's children. After the Uprising, the bones of his son and him were in the remains of his burnt house, thus presuming he and Jace were dead. He despises Downworlders and will go to any length to eradicate their existence from the world.
- Magnus Bane
  The High Warlock of Brooklyn who has a romantic interest in Alec Lightwood. When his name is found imprinted inside Clary's mind, Clary and her allies seek him out to uncover his connection to her past and her mother. He is first introduced when Isabelle states that she has an invitation to his party. Jocelyn had approached him when Clary was younger to erase Clary's memories of the Shadow World and raise her without her knowing of it. He saved Alec from death when the latter was injured by a Greater Demon. He has a cat named Chairman Meow. He is described as very glittery, with his hair often in spikes and strange clothing.
- Hodge Starkweather
  Isabelle, Alec, and Jace's eccentric tutor, who, in the end, he's found to be a follower of Valentine. He was originally in the Circle with Valentine, and as punishment, he was banished to the Institute where he was unable to leave. He is depicted with a raven on his shoulder, Hugo.
- Jocelyn Fray/Fairchild/Morgenstern
  Clary's mother and a former Shadowhunter seeking protection from the Shadow World as a means of protecting Clary from Valentine, her estranged husband. An artist, Jocelyn is described as elegant and beautiful, with long red hair darker than Clary's. She hid the Mortal Cup so that no one else could claim it or disclose its location, leaving subtle clues that only her daughter, Clary, would be able to decipher. When she found two-year-old Clary playing with faeries, Jocelyn sought Magnus Bane's help and every two years he cast a spell on Clary's mind that shielded her from seeing the Shadowhunter world. She was abducted by Valentine in hopes of discovering where she hid the Mortal Cup, Jocelyn is eventually found by Clary in a potion-induced coma, and is taken to the hospital.
- Madame Dorothea
  A 'witch' living downstairs from Clary and her mother. She was adopted by a warlock as warlocks are sterile and unable to have children. Her apartment acts as a sanctuary for Shadowhunters and Downworlders alike. It is later revealed that Clary's mother hid the Mortal Cup in a tarot card from a hand-painted tarot deck she gifted to Dorothea.

== Reception ==
Critical reception for City of Bones was mostly positive, with Publishers Weekly calling the book "a compelling story". Teen Ink gave a mixed review, stating that the book was "addicting" [sic] but that parts of the book were quite predictable. The School Library Journal also criticized the book's predictability, but wrote that "Despite the narrative flaws, this version of New York, full of Buffyesque teens who are trying to save the world, is entertaining and will have fantasy readers anxiously awaiting the next book in the series."

== Awards and recognition ==
- Locus Award Nominee for Best First Novel 2008
- Georgia Peach Book Award Nominee for Honor Book 2009
- Pacific Northwest Library Association Young Reader's Choice Award 2010

== Film adaptation ==
The film adaptation was released on August 21, 2013, directed by Harald Zwart and starring Lily Collins as Clary Fray and Jamie Campbell Bower as Jace Wayland. The film was shot in Toronto and New York.

== Allusions to other works ==
In the novel, Cassandra Clare includes references to the works of Holly Black, who is a friend of Clare's.

- At the beginning of the book, Clary is drawing and listening to a band called Stepping Razor. Stepping Razor is the name of Ellen Fierch's band in Holly Black's book, Tithe: A Modern Faerie Tale.
- In the scene in Chapter 10 where Clary and Jace are riding in the carriage, Clary looks out the window and sees a few homeless teenagers. One of them is a girl with a shaved head, the other a boy with dreadlocks and facial piercings who appears to be blind in one eye. These teenagers are the characters Valerie and Luis from Black's book Valiant: A Modern Tale of Faerie.

She also includes references to the works of Philip Reeve, whose Mortal Engines Quartet she drew inspiration from. Her inclusion of the antagonist Valentine, who is later revealed to be the father of Clary, is a nod to Philip Reeve's antagonist Thaddeus Valentine in Mortal Engines (2003, first in the Quartet), who is also discovered to be the father of one of the main characters.
