= Red Glove =

Red Glove may refer to:

- The Red Glove, 1919 film serial
- Red Glove (book), 2011 fantasy book
