= Eliza Wheeler =

American author and illustrator

- Born: December 21, 1982 (age 43); Duluth, Minnesota, U.S.
- Occupations: Illustrator, Writer
- Writing career
- Genres: Children's picture books, Illustration
- Website: wheelerstudio.com

Eliza Wheeler (born December 21, 1982) is an American writer and illustrator of children's books. She wrote and illustrated Miss Maple's Seeds (Penguin), which debuted on the New York Times Bestseller list and has sold more than a million copies. She is also the illustrator of Holly Black's 2014 Newbery Medal Honor Book Doll Bones (McElderry Books), Alison McGhee's Tell Me A Tattoo Story, Pat Zietlow-Miller's Wherever You Go, and Mara Rockliff's The Grudge Keeper (Peachtree). She lives in Los Angeles, California. She is a 2006 graduate of the University of Wisconsin–Stout with a BFA in Graphic Design.

== Works List ==
Writer and illustrator

- Miss Maple's Seeds (Nancy Paulsen/Penguin, Apr 2013), ISBN 9780399257926

Illustrator

- John Ronald’s Dragons: The Story of J.R.R. Tolkien, by Caroline McAlister. Roaring Brook Press, 2017.
- The Left-Handed Fate, by Kate Milford, (Aug 2016), ISBN 9780805098006
- Cody and the Fountain of Happiness, by Tricia Springstubb (Candlewick, Apr 2015), ISBN 9780763658571
- Wherever You Go, by Pat Zietlow Miller (Little, Brown, Apr 2015), ISBN 9780316400022
- The Incorrigible Children of Ashton Place series by Maryrose Wood (Balzer + Bray)
  - Book I: The Mysterious Howling paperback reprint edition (Apr 2015), ISBN 9780062366931
  - Book II: The Hidden Gallery paperback reprint edition (Apr 2015), ISBN 9780062366948
  - Book III: The Unseen Guest paperback reprint edition (Apr 2015), ISBN 9780062366955
  - Book IV: The Interrupted Tale paperback reprint edition (Apr 2015), ISBN 9780061791239
  - Book V: The Unmapped Sea (Apr 2015), ISBN 9780062110411
- Spirit's Key, by Edith Cohn (Farrar, Straus and Giroux, Sep 2014), ISBN 9780374300111
- The Grudge Keeper, by Mara Rockliff (Peachtree, Apr 2014), ISBN 9781561457298
- The Desperate Adventures of Zeno and Alya, by Jane Kelley (Feiwel & Friends, Oct 2013), ISBN 9781250023483
- Doll Bones, by Holly Black (Margaret K. McElderry, May 2013), ISBN 9781416963981
- What Does It Mean to be Present?, by Rana DiOrio (Little Pickle, Jul 2010), ISBN 9780984080687

== See also ==
- Children's literature
- Picture books
- Illustration
