= White Cat (novel) =

2010 novel by Holly Black

- First edition
- Author: Holly Black
- Cover artist: Michael Frost
- Language: English
- Genre: Fantasy
- Publisher: Margaret K. McElderry Books
- Publication date: May 4, 2010
- Publication place: United States
- Pages: 320
- Followed by: Red Glove

White Cat is the first book in The Curse Workers series about Cassel Sharpe, written by Holly Black. In this alternate world story, workers are rare people with magical abilities that sometimes run in families. Using their abilities requires skin contact and is illegal, which is why most workers are part of crime families. About .01% of the population are workers. There are 7 types of workers. Of those, about 60% are luck workers, while other skills, such as death working, emotion working, memory working, dream working and physical working less common. The rarest type of worker is a transformation worker: they can transform anything into something else.

== Plot ==
Although Cassel Sharpe comes from a large family of workers who are well connected to one of the major crime families, he believes himself to have no worker abilities. He is the youngest son with a mother in prison for illegally emotionally working people, a dead father, a death-worker grandfather, and two older brothers who work for the nephew and current heir of one of the biggest crime families in the area. Cassel's friend Lila was the daughter of the crime lord and other possible heir, but Cassel believes he killed her when they were fourteen.

Now seventeen, Cassel finds himself sleepwalking up on the roof at his prep school, dreaming of a white cat and nearly dies getting back down. This bizarre occurrence, the strange behavior of his brothers, and overheard conversations make Cassel suspicious that he's being manipulated, and he goes to a fortune teller to get amulets to protect himself from memory alteration, which he cuts and conceals inside his leg.

Further investigation leads Cassel to discover that his brothers had been keeping a white cat just like the one from his dreams, which is now free and following him around. He knows that transformation workers are very rare, but wonders if it could in fact be his "dead" friend Lila, who has the ability to work dreams. The cat is captured again and taken to the pound, so he rescues it, certain that something strange is going on. Shortly after, he discovers that one of the rocks under his skin has broken, and that his second oldest brother Barron has been manipulating Cassel's memories. He also finds out that he is a worker after all; a transformation worker. His brothers have been using him by making him change people into lifeless objects, effectively murdering them, and his brothers have also been altering his memory to keeping Cassel from remembering that he is a transformation working who has killed people (at their direction).

With this discovery, Cassel changes the white cat back into Lila. The two plan to reunite her with her father and allow her to take back her place as heir by revealing her cousin Anton's plan of killing her father and running the family himself. It succeeds, and things go mostly back to normal for Cassel despite his new-found ability. Lila still hates him for turning her into a cat, but when he arrives home from school a week later, she is waiting for him, having forgiven him. They kiss, which Cassel has always dreamed of, but are interrupted by a phone call from his mother, newly out of jail. His mother wants to surprise him with the news that she met Lila in New York and used her emotion ability to make Lila fall madly in love with Cassel. He demands she undo it, but his mother claims she cannot, and Cassel realizes that he was a mark himself, gullible enough to believe that Lila would forgive him and love him so easily.

== Reception ==
White Cat received mostly positive reviews. Kirkus Reviews called Black's work "a dark, complex Chinese puzzle box, full of cons, criminals and curses" with expected sequels to be "equally compelling." Kirkus concluded by encouraging readers to get the book: "Urban fantasy, con story, coming of age—whatever you call it, read it." Others followed with similar sentiments, including the reviewer "Jia" from DearAuthor.com: "I don’t know where we’re going from here, and I’d like to say that the ending was completely heartbreaking, but I’m definitely along for the ride." Andrea Chettle of Fantasy Book Review stated, "I loved this book. I read it in three days and then wished I hadn't. I really didn't want to leave the world or the characters."

Others delivered somewhat mixed reviews. Maureen Speller, speaking of White Cat, said that while some novels "seem to work well enough for the first reading, subsequent readings reveal faults so glaring one wonders how on earth one missed them before."

== See also ==
- Red Glove
- Black Heart
