= Megan Dowd Lambert =

American author and academic

Megan Dowd Lambert is an American author and academic who writes children's books and about children and reading.

== Biography ==
Lambert was born in Vermont.

She graduated from Smith College with a Bachelor of Arts degree in 1996 and from Simmons College with a Master of Arts degree in 2002.

She worked at the Eric Carle Museum of Picture Book Art in Amherst, Massachusetts. She has been a senior lecturer at Simmons University in Boston since 2009. She has been a visiting lecturer at Mt. Holyoke College and Boston University. She has contributed reviews to The Horn Book Magazine.

Lambert has published books for children as well as adult nonfiction about reading with children.

She received a Ezra Jack Keats New Writer Honor in 2016 for her picture book A Crow of His Own.

Lambert has seven children. She has written about her experiences as a foster and adoptive parent.

== Selected works ==
=== Picture books ===
- A Crow of His Own, illustrated by David Hyde Costello. Charlesbridge, 2015.
- Real Sisters Pretend, illustrated by Nicole Tadgell. Tilbury House, 2016.
- A Kid of Their Own, illustrated by Jessica Lanan. Charlesbridge, 2020.

=== April & Mae series ===
- April & Mae and the Book Club Cake: The Monday Book, illustrated by Briana Dengoue. Charlesbridge, 2022.
- April & Mae and the Soccer Match: The Tuesday Book, illustrated by Briana Dengoue. Charlesbridge, 2022.
- April & Mae and the Talent Show: The Wednesday Book, illustrated by Briana Dengoue. Charlesbridge, 2022.
- April & Mae and the Animal Shelter: The Thursday Book, illustrated by Briana Dengoue. Charlesbridge, 2023.
- April & Mae and the Sleepover: The Friday Book, illustrated by Gisela Bohórquez. Charlesbridge, 2023.
- April & Mae and the Movie Night: The Saturday Book, illustrated by Gisela Bohórquez. Charlesbridge, 2023.
- April & Mae and the Tea Party: The Sunday Book, illustrated by Briana Dengoue. Expected publication: Charlesbridge, 2023.

=== Adult non-fiction ===
- Reading Picture Books with Children: How to Shake Up Storytime and Get Kids Talking about What They See, foreword by Chris Raschka, Charlesbridge, 2015.
- Book Bonding: Building Connections Through Family Reading, illustrated by Mia Saine. Imagine, 2023.
