= The Coldest Girl in Coldtown =

2013 young adult novel by Holly Black

- Author: Holly Black
- Cover artist: Michael O
- Language: English
- Genre: Young adult fiction, horror, drama
- Published: 2013, Little, Brown Books for Young Readers
- Publication place: United States
- Media type: Print, e-book, audiobook
- Pages: 432 pages
- ISBN: 0316213101

The Coldest Girl in Coldtown is a 2013 young adult novel by Holly Black. The book was first published on September 3, 2013, through Little, Brown Books for Young Readers and follows Tana, a teenager that believes that she has been infected with vampirism. The basis for the novel came from a short story of the same name written by Black which was released in the prose anthology Eternal Kiss. Black was inspired to use the setting and the same title to tell the story of a different character set in the same world as the short story. The book was written to be a standalone novel but Black has stated on her website, "I know what happens next and I’ve been thinking more and more that a sequel could be in my future."

== Summary ==
Vampires were hidden, hunting in secret, when one newly turned vampire, Caspar, decided not to kill his victims. Vampire bites infect the bitten, and they turn Cold. Once they turn Cold, a person can become a vampire by drinking human blood. Caspar's victims turned around and created legions of new vampires before the governments around the world knew what was happening. Once the government started policing vampires and people who are Cold, they started sending them to Coldtowns so they could not infect or kill innocent people. The Coldtowns attracted many people, who were drawn in by the perceived glamor of vampires. Once in Coldtown, it was nearly impossible to leave a Coldtown.

At the beginning of the story, Tana wakes up in a bathtub after a wild high school party. When she walks out, she sees all of her classmates have been slaughtered by vampires, with the exception for her ex-boyfriend, Aidan, who has been bitten and tied to a bed. Next to him is a shackled vampire. Below them, in the basement, the vampires are awakening to come back up and kill them. Tana saves both Aidan and Gavriel, the captive vampire, but in her escape, one of the vampires nicks her leg with his fang. Afraid that she will turn Cold (into a vampire), she takes Gavriel, Aidan, and herself to the nearest Coldtown. On the way, they pick up Midnight and Winter, twins who are obsessed with going to Coldtown and becoming vampires. Midnight is more enthused than her twin brother, and she has a popular blog that chronicles her obsession with vampires.

Once in Coldtown, Tana realizes that Gavriel is the Thorn of Istra, and she realizes he is there to kill Lucien. They share a passionate kiss before he disappears for the morning light. Midnight and Winter turn on Aidan and Tana. They want Aidan to turn, and they leave Tana with him to sate his new hunger. However, Tana escapes, and Aidan kills another girl who set them up. Tana gets help by Jameson and Valentina, two humans in Coldtown. She goes to Lucien's famous party with Valentina to get back her pass to the outside (which Aidan had stolen). Midnight has turned into a vampire, after killing her twin brother, and she attacks Tana, who officially becomes infected with the Cold. Gavriel is at the party but appears to make a truce with Lucien, and they decide to kill the head vampire, the Spider. Valentina is captured and put into the dungeon, and Tana kills a vampire to save her. She drinks the vampire blood before being caught and put back into her room. She learns Lucien is going to turn on Gavriel and that her little sister, Pearl, has come to Coldtown to find her. She helps Valentina escape with Jameson's mom (who is one of the vampires who works for Lucien). Jameson, his mom, and Valentina promise to help find Pearl to keep her safe. Tana goes back into the mansion to kill Lucien and save Gavriel. She fails in her attempt, but then realizes that Gavriel is the Spider. He reveals this fact to Lucien, who gets scared. Then, Tana kills Lucien after he attacks her.

At the end of the story, Aidan saves Pearl, who is given the pass out of Coldtown by Tana. Jameson finds a place where Tana can hole up to wait out the infection and Gavriel comes down to be with Tana and tells her that he loves her. The story ends with Gavriel promising to stay with Tana until she gets better, and, if she is no longer human enough to do so, to help her get enough vampire blood to sate her appetite.

== Reception ==
Critical reception for The Coldest Girl in Coldtown has been predominantly positive and the book has received praise from Commonsensemedia, the Royal Oak Public Library, and Booklist. Strange Horizons praised the book heavily, writing that it was a "sharp, lavish, engaging book that not only manages to revitalize vampires, but lends itself easily to salient discussions of modern Western culture and American politics. A timely novel in every sense of the word, and one I'd very much recommend, both to existing fans of Holly Black and to anyone thinking of giving her a try." Tor.com and io9 also wrote positive reviews, Tor.com commented that the book would have a great appeal to people who liked "old-school vampires" and were potentially growing tired of vampires as depicted in popular media like Twilight and The Vampire Diaries. The School Library Journal was somewhat more mixed in their review and the reviewer stated that while they greatly enjoyed the book, it did have flaws such as the pacing and that "Tana’s risky behavior and generally troubled self is something the reader hears about but actually, from moment one she’s thoughtful and has a tendency to basic human decency, so the emotional core is satisfying but not astounding — because it’s actually inevitable given how Tana is written."

=== Awards ===
- School Library Journal Best Book of the Year (2013)
- Texas’s Tayshas Reading List Top Ten (2014)
- YALSA Best Fiction for Young Adults (2014)
- YALSA Amazing Audiobooks for Young Adults (2014)
