= Doll Bones =

2014 children's novel by Holly Black

- Dust jacket of the hard-cover edition showing the Newbery Medallion.
- Author: Holly Black
- Illustrator: Eliza Wheeler
- Language: English
- Genre: Young Adult Fiction, Fantasy, Gothic Fiction
- Publisher: McElderry Books, Scholastic Corporation
- Publication date: 2014
- Publication place: United States
- Media type: Print
- Pages: 244 pp
- ISBN: 9781416963981

Doll Bones is a 2013 children's novel by author Holly Black with illustrations by Eliza Wheeler. Doll Bones won the Mythopoeic Fantasy Award in Children's Literature and was a Newbery Medal Honor Book in 2014.

== Plot ==
Doll Bones is the story of Zachary "Zach" Barlow, Alice Magnaye, and Poppy Bell's quest to return a haunted doll to its proper grave site in another town.

Zach, Alice, and Poppy play a role-playing game with Horrific action figures and metal cut-outs. Poppy runs the game which involves Zach's character "William the Blade" and Alice's character "Lady Jaye" on a quest for the Great Queen aboard William's sailing ship, Neptune's Pearl. One day Zach discovers that his father has thrown out all of his action figures including William, effectively ending the game. Furious at his father, and embarrassed that he cares so much about a "kid's game", Zach decides not to tell Alice and Poppy what happened and instead says he just does not want to play anymore.

Zach is awakened in the middle of the night by Alice and Poppy who tell him that Poppy has had a dream about "The Queen" (an antique doll her mother keeps locked in a glass cabinet that the kids use for the game) and that the doll is made from the bones and ashes of a dead girl named Eleanor Kerchner who is now a ghost and wants to be returned to her proper grave. At first, Zach doesn't believe them but after being shown evidence, he decides to tag along. The three kids leave notes for their parents and take a night bus to East Liverpool, Ohio (a few hours' bus ride away) hoping to return the following evening to avoid discovery. On the bus they are accosted by a man named Tinshoe Jones who seems to see the doll as a real person and warns them that the bus driver talks with aliens who "change people's faces". The bus makes a stop in East Rochester, PA and the children flee when it appears the bus driver and station attendant intend to capture them.

They spend the night in a small park near the Ohio river and during the night their meager supplies are inexplicably torn apart and ruined. They enter a donut shop with exotic flavored donuts and the shopkeeper offers the "hungry blond girl" (the doll) a Pepto Bismol flavored donut. They argue about the quest, but, still hoping to catch the bus back home in time, decide to continue the quest if possible by walking to East Liverpool. The quest seems to end, however, when they find themselves on the banks of a tributary river flowing into the Ohio. Alice is ready to return home, but Poppy, realizing both Alice and Zach have secrets, blackmails them into continuing the quest. They steal a small sailboat named "Pearl" and clumsily sail their way to East Liverpool. Angry, wet, disheartened, and now late for the bus, the three argue again and Poppy reveals that Alice loves Zach and wants to date him.

Now angry and awkward, they enter town and find a diner where the attendant also seems to see the doll as a person which added more backing to Poppy believing that the doll is haunted. They find a map of town and break into the closed library where they research the cemetery and inadvertently spend the night when they all fall asleep. They are woken by Miss Katherine, a young, pink-haired librarian who locks them in a break room and makes them call their respective parents and guardians. The doll, however, is missing, and they resolve to break free, find the doll, and complete the quest. Zach finds the doll in a ladies' restroom in the basement near a display of Lukas Kerchner's exotic pottery and learns about Eleanor's father and her mysterious disappearance.

Fleeing the librarian the children steal two bikes and go to the cemetery where they look in vain for the willow tree that should mark the grave. Frustrated, Zach tells the girls the truth about the action figures and runs off into the cemetery where he lies down and sobs uncontrollably. The girls find him sitting by the stone of the Kerchner family which has a willow carved into it. They bury the doll and then walk to meet their respective guardians at the gate to the cemetery while promising to one another to keep the Story alive.

== Characters ==
- Zachary "Zach" Barlow--Age 12. A budding basketball star in Middle School, Zach's usual character in the Game is a pirate named "William the Blade".
- Alice Magnaye--Exact age not specified. An orphan and "early bloomer" who lives with her grandmother, Alice's usual character in the Game is daring thief "Lady Jaye".
- Poppy Bell--Exact age not specified. The de facto leader of "The Game", Poppy usually plays the villains including the Great Queen.
- Eleanor Kerchner--A young girl who died. Her father, Lukas, cremated her body and used her bones to make a bone porcelain doll (aka the "Great Queen"). Eleanor's ashes are located in the body of the doll.
- The Bells--All but absent from the story, the Bell parents have apparently given up on tending to their "wild" children. The older Bell children (a girl and two boys) are considered hoodlums in town.
- The Barlows--Zach's father has recently returned home after living separately and is trying to "be a father" to Zach. Zach's mother attempts to mediate between the two.
- The Magnayes--Alice's guardian, her grandmother, is overprotective and is in a long -running fight with her aunt Linda about how Alice should be raised.
- Bus Driver--Though his motives are unclear, the bus driver ignores Tinshoe Jones' harassment of the children and apparently tries to capture them in the East Rochester bus station.
- Tinshoe Jones--An apparent madman the children meet on the bus to East Liverpool, Tinshoe seems to see the doll as a real person and warns the children about the bus driver's contact with aliens.
- Donut Shop Attendant--The man who runs the donut shop who apparently also sees the doll as a real person and offers her a Pepto-Bismol flavored donut.
- Coffee Shop Attendant and Waitress--The older coffee shop attendant also seems to see the doll as a person, though the young waitress apparently does not.
- Miss Katherine-A young, pink-haired librarian in East Liverpool, Ohio. She tries to help the children get home, but does not assist in the quest.

== Critical reception ==
Many critics found Doll Bones to be a strong work. Barry Goldblatt and Jennifer Rofe, writing for Publishers Weekly, assert that "Black captures the adolescent sense that things are about to explode before they get explained. And it's a darn good adventure, too". Writing of the audio book, Polly Gibson calls Doll Bones "A bit of a creepy riff on Toy Story with a gruesome Sweeny Todd subplot, this powerful story will hold listener's interest". Some critics, however, were less impressed, but still found merit in the book. As Cynthia Ritter of Horn Book Magazine writes, "The narrative is uneven: while the doll is believably creepy, the horror elements and the ghost story remain under-developed, as do Poppy and Alice's characters, and the resolution is rather abrupt. But through Zach's complex perspective, author Black poignantly and realistically captures how adolescence inherently brings change; how growing up affects the ways children play; and the inevitable tests friendships face".

== Awards ==
- Newbery Medal Honor Book in 2014.
- Winner of the Mythopoeic Fantasy Award for Children's Literature in 2014.

== See also ==
- 2013 in literature
- Children's and teen's Literature
