= The Dark Artifices =

Series of fantasy novels by Cassandra Clare

- Lady Midnight; Lord of Shadows; Queen of Air and Darkness
- Author: Cassandra Clare
- Country: United States
- Language: English
- Genre: Fantasy, young adult fiction, urban fantasy
- Publisher: Margaret K. McElderry (US)
- Published: March 8, 2016 – December 4, 2018
- Media type: Print (hardcover and paperback); Audiobook
- No. of books: 3
- Preceded by: The Mortal Instruments
- Followed by: The Wicked Powers (Upcoming)

The Dark Artifices is a trilogy written by Cassandra Clare. The series is chronologically the fourth series in The Shadowhunter Chronicles and a sequel to The Mortal Instruments. It is set in Los Angeles. The series consists of three books: Lady Midnight, Lord of Shadows and Queen of Air and Darkness, in that particular order. Centered around the protagonist, Emma Carstairs, the series follows her journey as a Shadowhunter at the Los Angeles Institute, and her life with her best-friend and parabatai, Julian Blackthorn, and his family. The series is about a sacred bond of "parabatai", two bonded Shadowhunters, and it is more valuable than any bond in this world. This bond makes the two more powerful and strong, but there is only one drawback - it is forbidden to fall in love with your parabatai. It so happens that Emma and Julian, two parabatai, have fallen in love. The Dark Artifices is a trilogy about their struggle against their enemies and how the two protagonists deal with their forbidden love and the resulting consequences. The series is told from the point-of-view of the various different characters in the story.

== Publication history ==
1. Lady Midnight (March 8, 2016)
2. Lord of Shadows (May 23, 2017)
3. Queen of Air and Darkness (December 4, 2018)

== Characters ==
- Emma Carstairs (first featured in City of Heavenly Fire): Emma Carstairs is known to be the next greatest Shadowhunter, or in other words "the next Jace Herondale" (so to speak). In this book she faces a lot of tough decisions about her future while fighting for information on her parents' death. She also struggles with the question of her forbidden love. She treats the Blackthorns as her biological family and would do anything for them. She is friends with Cristina Rosales and the ex-girlfriend of Cameron Ashdown.
- Julian Blackthorn (first featured in City of Lost Souls): Julian Blackthorn is Emma's parabatai and lives in the Los Angeles Institute with his siblings, his uncle Arthur and Emma. Due to Arthur's mental health, Julian runs the Institute and cares for his siblings. Julian has four younger siblings; Ty (Tiberius), Livvy (Livia), Dru (Drusilla), and Tavvy (Octavian).
- Helen Blackthorn (first featured in City of Lost Souls): Helen is the eldest Blackthorn sibling. She and her brother Mark are half-fey. Helen is married to Aline Penhallow. Following the events in "City of Heavenly Fire", Helen is exiled to Wrangel Island with her wife.
- Mark Blackthorn (first featured in City of Heavenly Fire): Mark Blackthorn is the older half-brother of Julian, Livia, Tiberius, Drusilla and Octavian. He is half-fey. After being given to The Wild Hunt in City of Heavenly Fire, Mark is returned to his family as a bargaining chip for Emma and the Blackthorns to solve murders involving the fey.
- Cristina Mendoza Rosales: Cristina Mendoza Rosales is a Shadowhunter from the Mexico Institute, who, in her nineteenth year comes to study at the Los Angeles Institute for her travel year and becomes best friends with Emma.
- Diego Rocío Rosales: Diego is a Centurion and someone Cristina once loved. Also called "Perfect Diego." Diego was in love with Cristina Rosales, and they had plans to marry while Cristina also planned to become parabatai with his younger brother, Jaime. Cristina's mother greatly approved of their union. Diego and Cristina are distant relatives.
- The Blackthorn Children (Livia, Tiberius, Drusilla, Octavian) (featured in City of Heavenly Fire): Livia, Tiberius, Drusilla and Octavian are the younger siblings of Julian, Helen, and Mark. Livia and Tiberius are twins.
- Magnus Bane (featured in every published The Shadowhunter Chronicles book): Magnus Bane is the High Warlock of Brooklyn and Alec Lightwood's boyfriend.
- Kieran (featured in Tales From the Shadowhunter Academy): Kieran is the Prince of the Unseelie Court and a member of the Wild Hunt.
- Kit Rook: Kit Rook is a Shadowhunter from a previously unknown branch of the Herondale family.
- Diana Wrayburn (featured in City of Heavenly Fire): Diana Wrayburn is the tutor at the Los Angeles Institute, a job previously held by Katrina, who became an Endarkened.
- Clary Fairchild (featured in every published book of The Mortal Instruments): Clarissa (Clary) Fairchild is the co-head of the New York Institute alongside her boyfriend Jace. Clary first met Emma in 2008, during the events of ‘’City of Heavenly Fire ’’.
- Jace Herondale (featured in every published book of The Mortal Instruments): Jace Herondale is the co-head of the New York Institute alongside his girlfriend Clary.
- Malcom Fade (featured in City of Heavenly Fire): Malcom is a minor antagonist of the series and the High Warlock of L.A. He is close to the Blackthorns especially Annabel, who was murdered by her family for loving a warlock. Intent on getting revenge, Malcolm vowed to do anything to get her back, including murder.
- Annabel Blackthorn: Annabel Blackthorn was a Shadowhunter in the early 19th century. After her family killed her for shaming them, she was resurrected by Malcolm in 2012. After she woke up, she killed him for making her suffer during his attempt to bring her back. She later also murdered Livia Blackthorn and was then kidnapped to the Unseelie Court by the Unseelie King.
- Alec Lightwood (featured in every published book of The Mortal Instruments): Alexander Gideon Lightwood-Bane is a Shadowhunter and the current Consul of the Clave. He is the husband of Magnus Bane, is the adoptive father of Rafael and Max Lightwood-Bane, and is the older brother of Isabelle and Max, as well as the adoptive brother and parabatai of Jace Herondale.
- Jessamine (featured in every published book of The Infernal Devices): Jessamine was a ghost sworn to protect the London Institute since she died in 1878.

== Theme ==
The main theme developing in Cassandra Clare's The Dark Artifices series is the concept of maturing and the transition into adulthood. The conscious decision one must make between responsibility and personal desire is explored through Julian and Emma's hesitancy in Lady Midnight. The two struggle between pursuing their feelings for one another and weighing the consequences of defying Shadowhunter law, which could ultimately threaten the Blackthorn family. Clare also explores the experience of having one's beliefs challenged, and how to handle such instances.
