= The Mortal Instruments: City of Bones =

2013 urban fantasy film

- Theatrical release poster
- Directed by: Harald Zwart
- Screenplay by: Jessica Postigo
- Based on: City of Bones by Cassandra Clare
- Produced by: Don Carmody; Robert Kulzer
- Starring: Lily Collins; Jamie Campbell Bower; Robert Sheehan; Kevin Zegers; Lena Headey; Kevin Durand; Aidan Turner; Jemima West; Godfrey Gao; CCH Pounder; Jared Harris; Jonathan Rhys Meyers
- Cinematography: Geir Hartly Andreassen
- Edited by: Jacqueline Carmody
- Music by: Atli Örvarsson
- Production companies: Constantin Film International GmbH; Unique Features; Don Carmody Productions
- Distributed by: Entertainment One (Canada); Constantin Film (Germany); Screen Gems (through Sony Pictures Releasing, United States)
- Release dates: August 12, 2013 (Cinerama Dome); August 21, 2013 (Canada, Germany and United States)
- Running time: 130 minutes
- Countries: Canada; Germany
- Language: English
- Budget: $60 million
- Box office: $95.3 million

The Mortal Instruments: City of Bones is a 2013 urban fantasy film based on the first book of The Mortal Instruments series by Cassandra Clare. It was directed by Harald Zwart, with a script written by Jessica Postigo. The film stars Lily Collins as Clary Fray, a teenager from New York City who meets a group of Nephilim known as the Shadowhunters while also discovering her own heritage and her family history. The cast also includes Jamie Campbell Bower, Robert Sheehan, Kevin Zegers, Lena Headey, Kevin Durand, Aidan Turner, Jemima West, Godfrey Gao, CCH Pounder, Jared Harris, and Jonathan Rhys Meyers.

The film's development began when Constantin Film optioned the film rights to the book series. Casting announcements started in 2010, with Collins being the first actress attached to the project. Principal photography took place in Ontario between August and November 2012. It is an international co-production between Canada and Germany.

The Mortal Instruments: City of Bones premiered in Los Angeles on August 12, and was released on August 21, 2013, by Entertainment One in Canada and by Constantin Film in Germany. It was released in the United States on the same day by Screen Gems. The film was a box-office bomb, grossing $95.3 million worldwide against a production budget of $60 million and received generally negative reviews from critics for its plot and lack of originality.

The film was originally intended to launch a film series and to continue with a sequel based on the second book, City of Ashes, that was in development with Sigourney Weaver set to join the cast. However, it was postponed indefinitely and ultimately cancelled due to the film's poor performance. A reboot television series, titled Shadowhunters, premiered in 2016 on Freeform and ran for three seasons.

== Plot ==
New York teenager Clary Fray begins seeing and drawing a strange symbol, worrying her mother Jocelyn and family friend, Luke Garroway. At a crowded nightclub with friend Simon Lewis, only Clary witnesses Jace Wayland and his accomplices killing a man. The next day at a coffee shop with Simon, Clary is confronted by Jace, who questions why she can see him when no one else can. Meanwhile, two men, Emil Pangborn and Samuel Blackwell, arrive at the Fray apartment searching for a cup. Jocelyn calls Clary, telling her to stay away and warn Luke about someone named Valentine; she then drinks a potion putting her in a deep sleep. Returning home, Clary finds her mother missing, and is attacked by a dog-like creature. Jace, who is a "Shadowhunter", appears and kills it, explaining that it, like the "man" killed at the nightclub, was a demon.

The Frays' neighbor, Madame Dorothea, is a witch and helps Jace deduce that Pangborn and Blackwell seek the Mortal Cup, a lost artifact. Jace and Clary, along with Simon, go to Luke's antique store. Pangborn and Blackwell are interrogating Luke who, to protect Clary and Jocelyn, claims he cares nothing about the Frays and only wants the Cup. The trio escapes to the Shadowhunter Institute, a hidden cathedral-like building, where Jace treats Clary, who was stung by an attacking demon. She and Simon meet two other Shadowhunters, siblings Alec and Isabelle Lightwood, and Shadowhunter leader, Hodge. Invisible to mortals, Shadowhunters are half-human, half-angel demon slayers. Clary has inherited her Shadowhunter mother's powers, including drawing temporary magical runes on the skin. The Cup is one of three Mortal Instruments given to the first Shadowhunter by the Angel Raziel. Shadowhunters are either descended from other Shadowhunters or made by drinking from the Cup. Valentine Morgenstern, a Shadowhunter who betrayed the order, and now seeks the Cup to control both Shadowhunters and demons.

Jace takes Clary to the City of Bones, a sanctuary beneath a cemetery. While attempting to unlock Clary's blocked memories, the Silent Brothers uncover a connection to Magnus Bane, the High Warlock of Brooklyn. At Bane's nightclub, he tells Clary that Jocelyn had him block knowledge of the Shadowhunter world from Clary's mind. When Vampires kidnap Simon, Jace, Alec, Isabelle, and Clary trail them to their hideout. They find Simon, but vampires outnumber them. During their battle, werewolves intervene and save them.

As Simon recovers at the institute, Clary notices two puncture marks on his shoulder, while he discovers he no longer needs eyeglasses. Clary shares an evening with Jace, ending in a kiss. When Simon jealously confronts Clary about it, she downplays the incident, angering Jace. Simon confesses he loves Clary, who does not reciprocate his feelings.

Clary realizes the Cup is hidden inside one of Madame Dorothea's tarot cards that her mother painted as a gift. The group goes to Dorothea's apartment, where a demon has replaced her. Simon and Jace kill it, but Alec is lethally stung. Clary retrieves the Cup card, and they return to the institute. Hodge summons Magnus Bane to heal Alec.

Clary removes the Cup from the card and gives it to Hodge, who betrays them by summoning Valentine through a portal and giving him the Cup. When Valentine reveals he is Clary's father, she refuses to join him. She jams the Cup back into the card, then escapes through the portal that transports her to Luke's store. Luke, revealed to be one of the werewolves who fought the vampires, confirms that Valentine is her father. Clary also had an older brother named Jonathan, who died as a toddler. Luke and his werewolf pack go to the institute with Clary to battle Valentine who summons demons through a roof opening. Simon finds Jocelyn, still unconscious, at the institute. He and Isabelle close the opening with help from a repentant Hodge.

Clary and Jace fight Valentine, who claims Jace is his son, though Hodge called this out as a lie privately beforehand. Clary tricks Valentine by giving him a replica Cup, then pushes him into the portal, destroying it. Jocelyn is rescued but remains unresponsive at the hospital. Clary uses her new-found powers to repair the apartment. Jace arrives, confessing he needs her. He disbelieves they are siblings and plans to uncover the truth. Realizing she belongs in the Shadowhunter world, Clary returns to the Institute with Jace.

== Cast ==
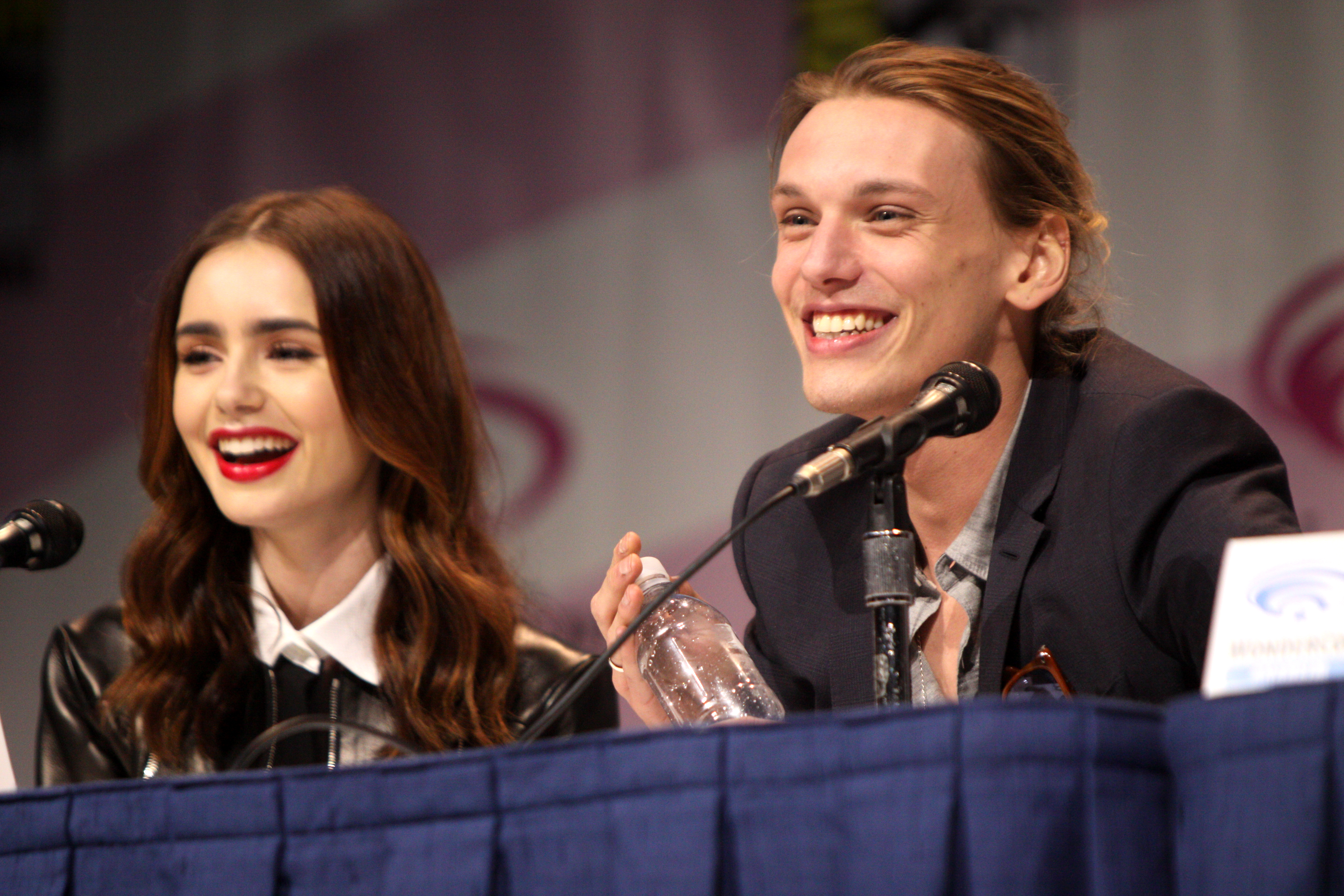

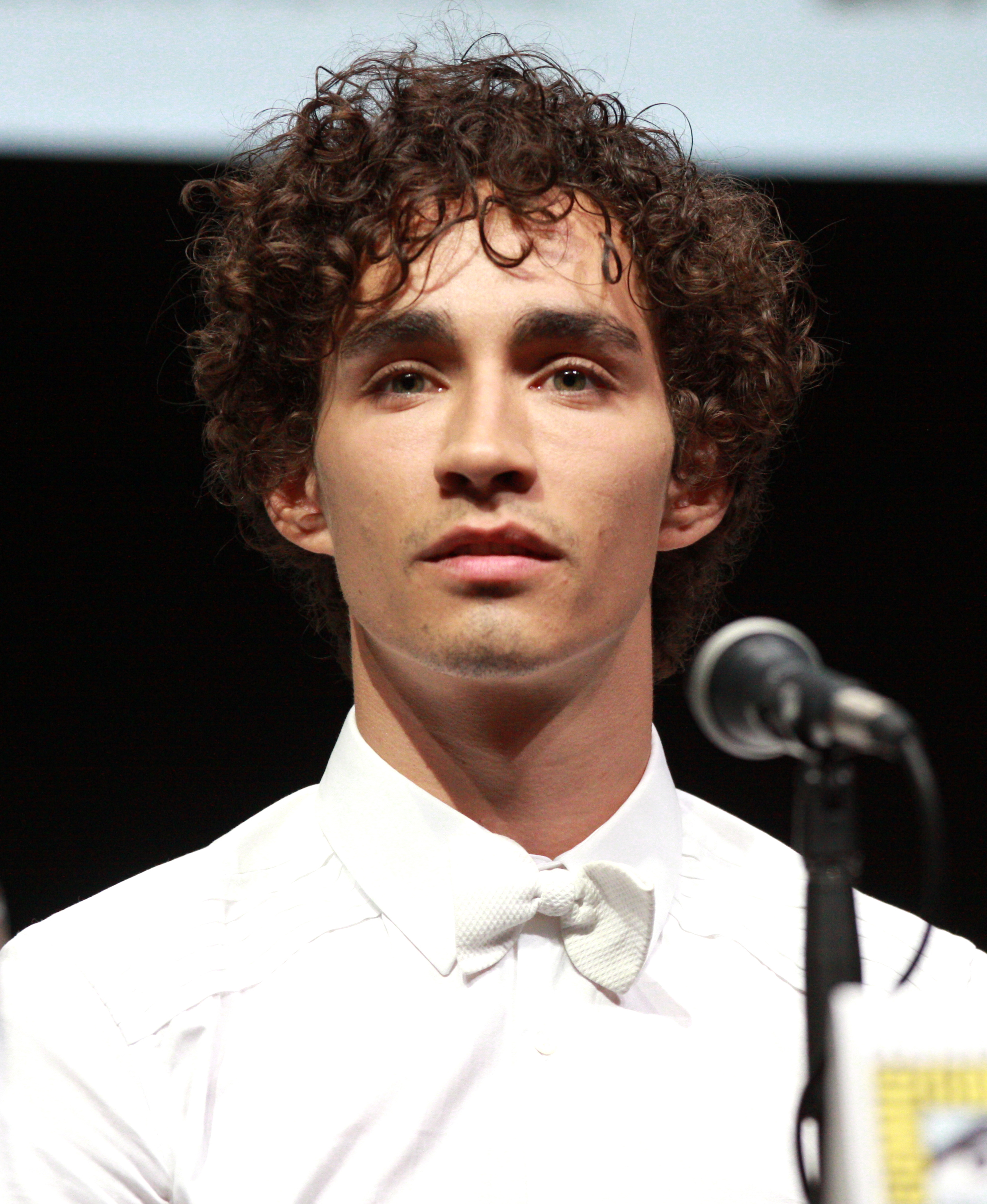

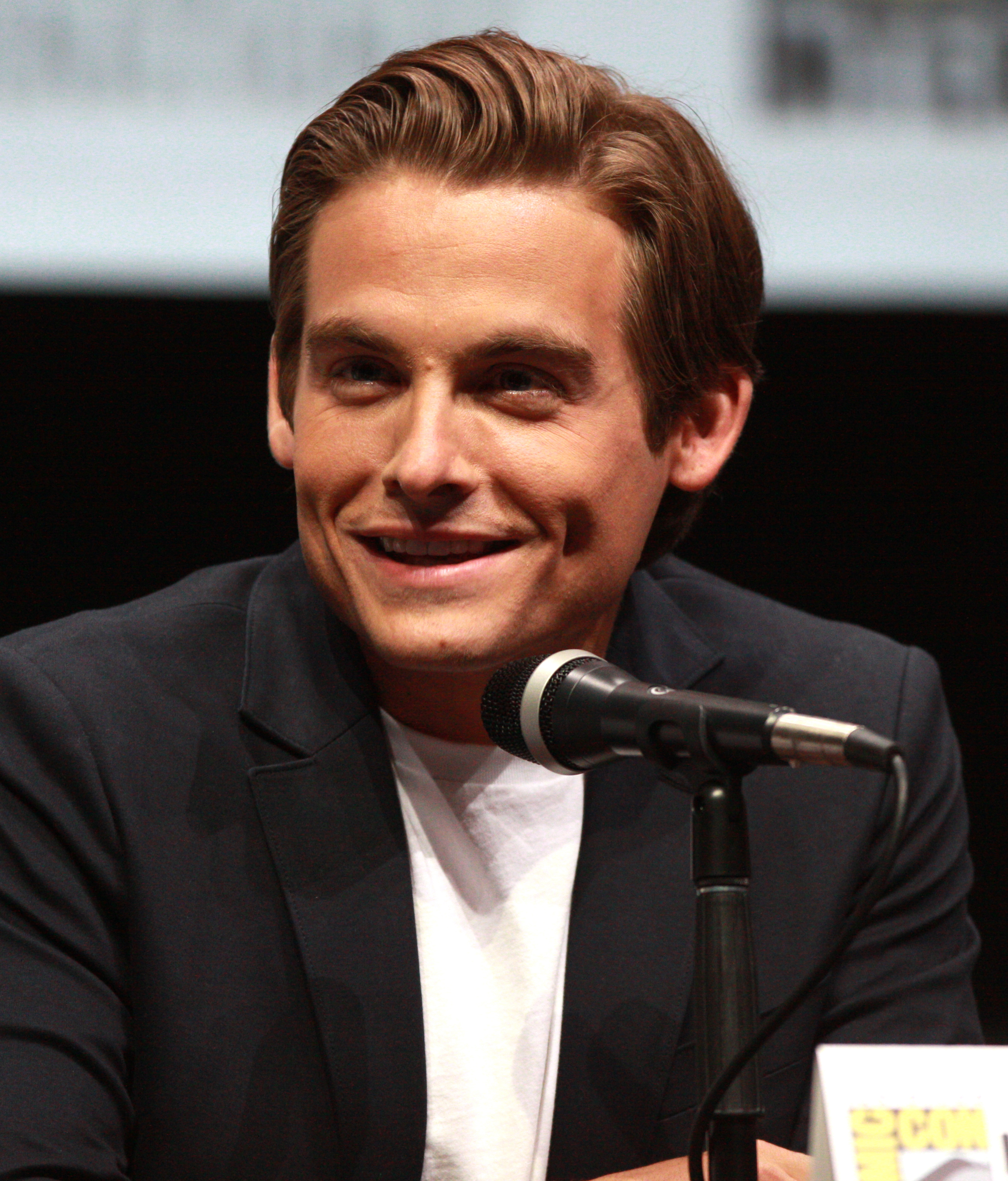

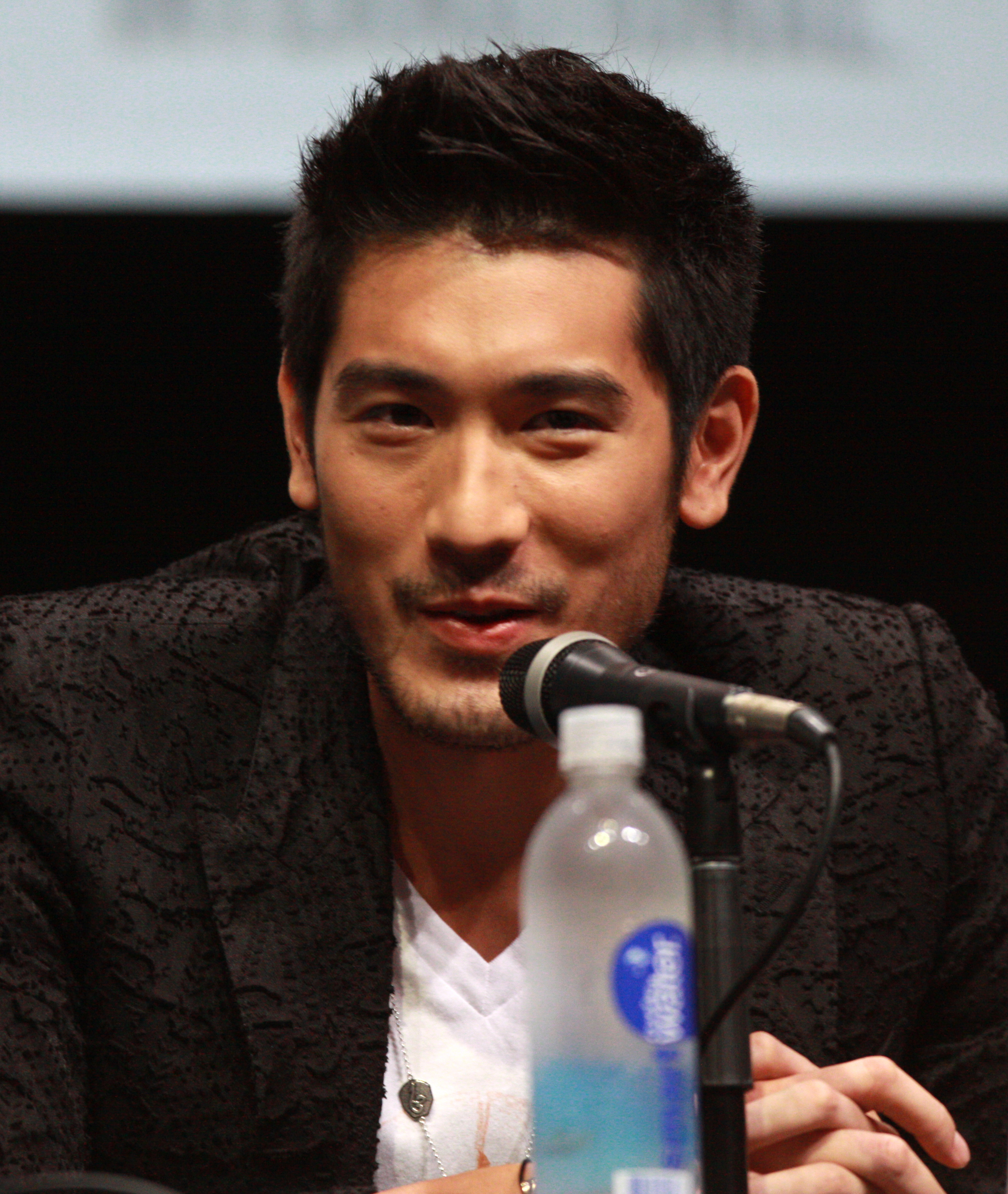

Lily Collins, Jamie Campbell Bower, Robert Sheehan, Kevin Zegers and Godfrey Gao promoting the film

- Lily Collins as Clary
- Jamie Campbell Bower as Jace
- Robert Sheehan as Simon
- Kevin Zegers as Alec
- Lena Headey as Jocelyn
- Kevin Durand as Pangborn
- Aidan Turner as Luke
- Jemima West as Isabelle
- Godfrey Gao as Magnus Bane
- CCH Pounder as Dorothea
- Jared Harris as Hodge
- Jonathan Rhys Meyers as Valentine

== Production ==
=== Pre-production ===
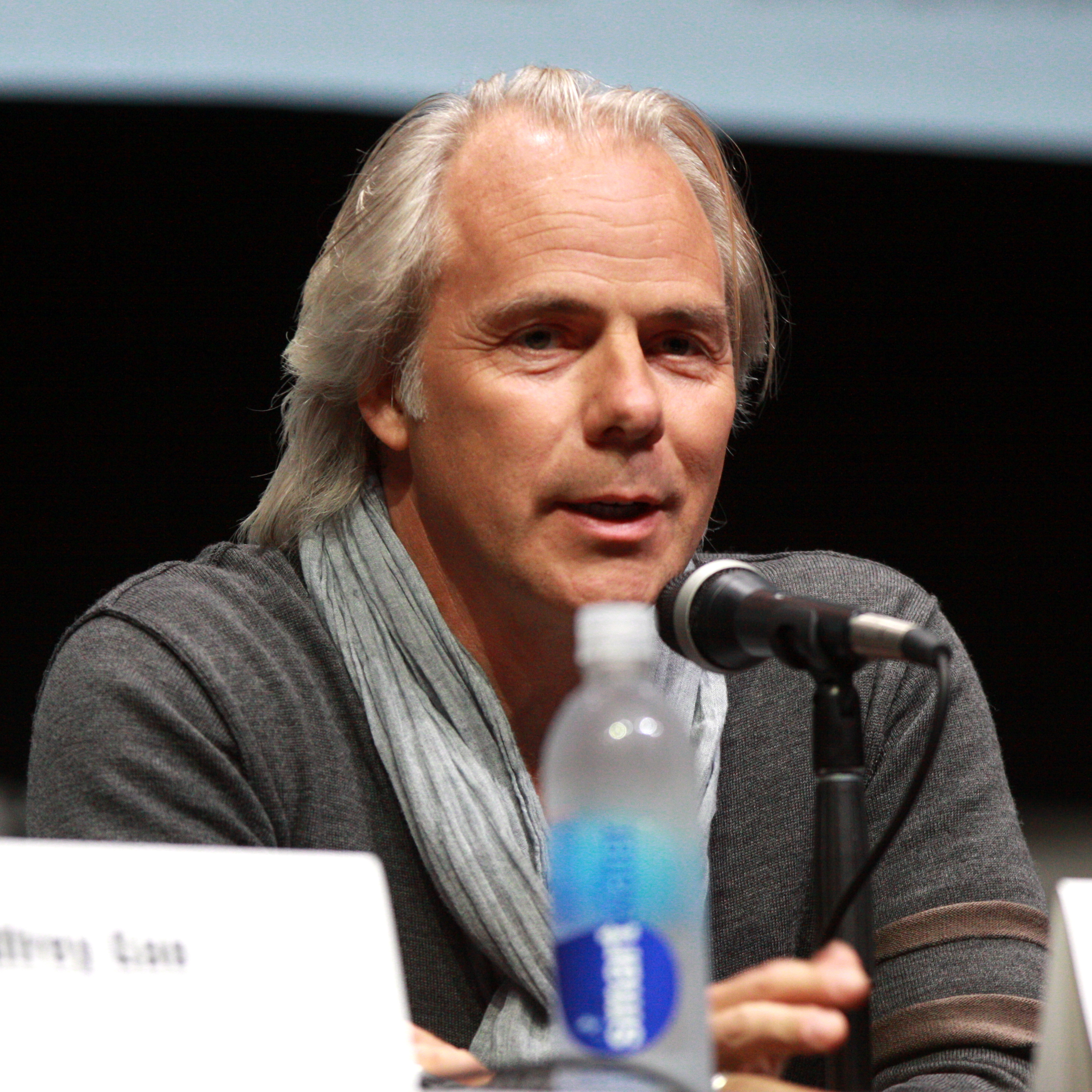
Director Harald Zwart at the 2013 San Diego Comic-Con promoting the film

While shopping the film prospect around, author Cassandra Clare had difficulty finding a studio interested in making a film with a female in the lead role. Studios asked her to switch the lead to a male character, which she refused. The film is a co-production of the Germany company Constantin Film Produktion GmbH and Canadian company Don Carmody Productions and a co-production with Unique Features. Scott Stewart had initially been attached to direct the film, but he left to produce a television series based on Legion. Harald Zwart replaced him shortly after.

=== Casting ===
On December 9, 2010, it was announced that Lily Collins had been cast in the role of Clary Fray. Alex Pettyfer was originally offered the role of Jace Wayland, but turned it down. Alexander Ludwig, Ed Speleers and Leebo Freeman tested for the role but it went to Jamie Campbell Bower. Xavier Samuel, Nico Tortorella, Max Irons, and Douglas Booth were also in consideration.

=== Filming ===
Principal photography took place between August 20 and November 7, 2012, on location in Toronto and Hamilton, Ontario, and New York City.

== Music ==
Two soundtracks were released for the film: The Mortal Instruments: City of Bones (Original Motion Picture Soundtrack) was released by Republic Records in stores and digital retailers on August 20, 2013. Upon its first week, the album debuted at #32 on the US Billboard 200. The same day, Atli Örvarsson's score was released into a separate album, for physical purchase and digital download.

The soundtrack is headlined by Demi Lovato, Zedd, Colbie Caillat, AFI remixed by LA Riots, and Jessie J among others. It is a collaboration between trance DJs Myon & Shane 54 with Seven Lions, as well as a song by Bryan Ellis, produced by Brian West. Some songs, including Lovato's "Heart by Heart" and Caillat's "When the Darkness Comes", were recorded specifically for City of Bones. Zedd "scored for a key scene in the film". Caillat's "When the Darkness Comes" were released as the first promotional single on July 9, 2013. "Almost Is Never Enough", performed by Ariana Grande and Nathan Sykes was released as the second single from the album on August 19, 2013, and debuted on the Billboard Hot 100 at number 84.

Beth Crowley had also written a song inspired by the book called "Warrior". "All I Need" by Radiohead was the song used in the trailer for the film.

== Release ==
A teaser trailer was released in November 2012, and a second trailer was released March 2013. The film was originally due for release on August 23, 2013, but was pushed back two days earlier, on August 21, 2013. The film secured broad European distribution deals at Cannes.

The film premiered on August 12, 2013, at the Cinerama Dome in Hollywood.

=== Marketing ===
According to the Los Angeles Times, $60 million was spent on marketing. Kulzer, Constantin's co-president, stated "$60 million has been spent worldwide on prints and advertising...." and went on to explain the importance of managing expectations.

=== Home media ===
The Mortal Instruments: City of Bones was released on DVD and Blu-ray on December 3, 2013, by Sony Pictures Home Entertainment.

== Reception ==
=== Critical response ===
On the critical response aggregation website Rotten Tomatoes, the film holds a rating of 13% based on 126 reviews, with an average rating of 3.9/10. The site's critics consensus reads: "The Mortal Instruments: City of Bones borrows ingredients from seemingly every fantasy franchise of the last 30 years—but can't seem to figure out what to do with them." Metacritic assigned the film a weighted average score of 33 out of 100 based on 35 critics, indicating "generally unfavorable reviews".

The Telegraph's Robbie Collin gave the film one out of five stars, saying, "This gothic teen fantasy is one of the most disastrous page-to-screen adaptations in memory". Collin added "the plot is an incomprehensible tangle of dead ends and recaps, and afterwards you realise only two things have stuck: the story's countless unsubtle borrowings from very recent pop culture... and a brief aside in which we learn one of the earliest demon-hunters was Johann Sebastian Bach." Michael Rechtshaffen from The Hollywood Reporter also gave it a negative review, saying, "Certainly not the first and very unlikely the last studio attempt at launching a Twilight/Hunger Games franchise of their very own, The Mortal Instruments: City of Bones is a bona fide saga all right—just not in a good way" adding "Despite the overstuffed assortment of vampires, werewolves, warlocks and demons of all shapes and sizes, The Mortal Instruments seldom feels like anything more than a shameless, soulless knockoff." New York Daily News also gave it a negative rating of 1 star out of 5; critic Jordan Hoffman wrote, "This one is by far the worst of the Twilight copies. And when that bunch includes The Host and I Am Number Four, that's saying something." Hoffman added, "Despite an avalanche of back story, the film is merely an excuse to hop from one spookily dressed set to another. Alas, the titular City of Bones is more of a basement. Other than a gag about a cache of weapons beneath every church altar, there's hardly a moment of levity or imagination. For a film that is wall-to-wall fantasy, you've seen all of this before, in much better movies."

Tom Keogh of The Seattle Times also gave it a negative review, stating, "City of Bones is so overwhelmed by CGI effects that it amounts to white noise for the eyes. Far worse is the way director Harald Zwart can't establish a mature tone to support some of the story's genuinely bold and challenging elements, especially a forbidden-love theme that deserves a more serious context". A more average review came from film critic Stephanie Merry of The Washington Post, who said, "To be fair, there are elements worth celebrating. The film is thankfully less self-serious than the mopey Twilight films. The Mortal Instruments revels in its own camp." She added, "But there is plenty of room for improvement. The action flick is overly long, complicated and, even by teen romance standards, cringe-worthy in its cheesiness."

David Blaustein from ABC News also gave the film an average review of two-and-a-half out of five stars, saying, "Director Harald Zwart unsuccessfully tries to compress teen angst, love, passion, unfulfilled dreams and action into an overzealous, over-the-top, never-ending finale which seems about as well planned as throwing rocks and sand into a blender in the hope that if you blend it long enough at high-enough speed, you might wind up with a delicious milkshake." He then added, "The Mortal Instruments: City of Bones is not a very good film by any stretch of the imagination. However, it does possess a slick, beautiful, young-adult aesthetic and a supernatural, emotional yet nonsensical love triangle that the film's target demographic goes crazy for."

Venetia Falconer of MTV News gave the film a positive review, with a score of 4 out of 5 stars, posting, "The Mortal Instruments more than lives up to its hype of 'The New Twilight'. The special effects are impressive, the battle scenes enthralling and there is solid acting from all members of the cast. The film's main strength is that it perfectly hits the right balance between drama and comedy."

Cinema audiences responded more positively than critics. Viewers who saw the film on the opening Wednesday, gave an average grade of B+, according to market research firm CinemaScore. The audience was 68% female and 46% under the age of 21.

=== Box office ===
City of Bones grossed $9.3 million for the three-day weekend in the U.S. and $18.2 million worldwide, debuting in #3 place as the highest ranked new release, although losing out on the top two spots to holdovers from previous weeks (Lee Daniels' The Butler and We're the Millers). For the five-day cumulative total, it grossed $14.1 million in the U.S. and $23.2 million worldwide, placing it below estimates of Variety at $18 million, The Hollywood Reporter at $15 million, and Sony itself who predicted $15 million. According to The Wrap, the film "failed to connect" and is on the same course as other misfires Beautiful Creatures and The Host. Forbes also made comparisons with Beautiful Creatures and The Host, and called the five-day weekend gross "a full-blown disaster" as well as "the biggest bomb of the weekend".

Executive producer Martin Moszkowicz blamed the weak opening in the United States on "a strongly competitive environment", including competition from You're Next and The World's End, as well as strong holdovers The Butler and We're the Millers. Moszkowicz was confident, saying it was still too early to call, with the film still rolling out release in more territories worldwide.

It went on to gross $31.2 million in North American and $59.4 million internationally, for a worldwide total of $90.6 million.

The Hollywood Reporter described the film as a "major in-house flop" and contributing to studio Constantin's losses for the 2013 year.

=== Accolades ===
The Mortal Instruments won four Canadian Screen Awards: Achievement in Make-Up, Achievement in Overall Sound, Achievement in Sound Editing and Achievement in Visual Effects. It was also nominated for Achievement in Costume Design and Achievement in Art Direction/Production Design. The film was nominated at the 2014 Teen Choice Awards for Choice Movie: Action, Choice Movie: Actor Action, and Choice Movie: Actress Action, but lost to Divergent in all categories.

== Sequel ==
=== Canceled sequels ===
The film was announced on May 8, 2013, by Constantin Films, three months prior to the first installment of The Mortal Instruments films to even hit theaters. It was reported that Lily Collins would be returning as Clary Fray, in addition to Jamie Campbell Bower, and Kevin Zegers in their respective roles. In this initial announcement it was also reported that director Harald Zwart would be returning as well. In July 2013, The Hollywood Reporter announced that actress Sigourney Weaver would be joining the cast for The Mortal Instruments: City of Ashes. In an August 2013 interview, Bower revealed that the City of Ashes film was set to film in "Europe, and then Mexico, Hong Kong, back to London for two days, out here for five days, Toronto, back to England for Christmas..." In August 2013, after the film opened below expectations, Robert Kulzer, Constantin's co-president, explained that a sequel was still warranted given increasing book sales and soundtrack revenues.

Filming was set to start September 23, 2013, in Toronto Canada, but was announced to be halted September 10. The Hollywood Reporter was the first to announce on October 23, 2013, that production on The Mortal Instruments: City of Ashes would resume. Constantin Films was said to have reviewed what went wrong with the first film searching for an answer as to why it performed lower than projections estimated. Martin Moszkowicz, Constantin Film’s head of film and TV said “That [the under-performance] may have been one issue in our marketing, that we focused too much on a very young audience segment."

Scott Mendelson of Forbes magazine expressed surprise that a sequel was in production: "The Mortal Instruments: City of Bones received neither positive reviews nor box office large enough to justify its production and marketing expenses. Yet, against all odds and arguably against all logic, ... it's getting a sequel!" In December 2013, author Cassandra Clare took to the internet to voice her thoughts on the City of Ashes delay, “I really think fans wouldn’t have been happy with the screenplay as it was,” Clare said. On March 20, 2014, Yahoo! reported that actor and model Godfrey Gao would be reprising his role as Magnus Bane, when production started on City of Ashes. On May 20, 2014, Harald Zwart revealed that the studio still had intentions to make the sequel, but explained that he would not direct it, so that he could focus on other projects, although he complimented the first film as "a good window [for him] to show off".

Cassandra Clare, in September 2014 at a fan meet and greet in Brazil was asked about the film and about the rewriting of the script. Clare said, "They’re re-writing, well, after the first Mortal Instruments movie came out, they got a lot of people complaining it wasn’t like the books. And so, they had a second screenplay for City of Ashes and it was even less like the books, like it was NOTHING, NOTHING like the books… Valentine had a submarine? And Magnus ran for Mayor of New York. It was very weird. So, they kinda looked at the screenplay and they looked at the fan response and they were like “We can’t do this, we have to throw the screenplay away and do a completely new screenplay that’s more like the books”. So that’s what they’ve been working on, it’s complicated cause usually if you’re doing a series of movies, you have the screenplay ready by the time the first movie has come out, you have the screenplay for the second movie so you can go right into filming it, and they didn’t have one. Takes a year to do a screenplay so I was hoping the next couple of weeks I would get to see the new screenplay for City of Ashes."

But rather than having a new screenplay ready like Clare hoped, in October 2014, it was announced that The Mortal Instruments: City of Ashes would be shelved in favor of making Shadowhunters a television series for Freeform based on The Mortal Instruments novels.

=== Television series ===
On October 12, 2014, at MIPCOM, Constantin confirmed that The Mortal Instruments would return as a television series, abandoning previous plans for a film sequel, with Ed Decter as showrunner to start production for next year on at least two or three international shows. Constantin Film and TV head Martin Moszkowicz told The Hollywood Reporter that "It actually makes sense to do (the novels) as a TV series. There was so much from the book that we had to leave out of the Mortal Instruments film. In the series we'll be able to go deeper and explore this world in greater detail and depth."

The television series ran for three seasons, from January 2016 to May 2019.

== Games ==
To tie in with the film, Sony Pictures worked with developers PlayFirst to release a game on August 15, 2013. The game, available free for Android and iOS, allows players to hunt demons and supernatural monsters like the Shadowhunters of the story. That includes cross-platform features, allowing users to sign in on Facebook and save their progress across Android and iOS devices.
