= Caroline McAlister =

American children's author (b. 1960)

Caroline McAlister (born August 2, 1960) is an American author of children's books.

== Biography ==
McAlister was born in New Orleans, Louisiana. She has a master of arts degree.

She formerly worked as an English professor at Guilford College.

She has published four books since 2007: Holy Mole! A Folktale from Mexico (August House LittleFolk, 2007), Brave Donatella and the Jasmine Thief, (Charlesbridge, 2010), John Ronald’s Dragons: The Story of J.R.R. Tolkien (Roaring Brook Press, 2017), and Finding Narnia: The Story of C. S. Lewis and His Brother (2019). Finding Narnia received a starred review from Kirkus Reviews that called the book "a vivid portrait of inspiration and imagination focuses on teamwork and historical fact".

McAlister lives in Greensboro, North Carolina. She is married and has two children.

== Selected works ==
- Holy Mole! A Folktale from Mexico. Illustrated by Stefan Czernecki. August House LittleFolk, 2007.
- Brave Donatella and the Jasmine Thief. Illustrated by Donald Hendricks. Charlesbridge, 2010.
- John Ronald’s Dragons: The Story of J.R.R. Tolkien. Illustrated by Eliza Wheeler. Roaring Brook Press, 2017.
- Finding Narnia: The Story of C. S. Lewis and His Brother. Illustrated by Jessica Lanan. Roaring Brook Press, 2019.
