= The Folk of the Air (series) =

Fantasy book series by Holly Black

- The Cruel Prince (2018); The Wicked King (2019); The Queen of Nothing (2019); How the King of Elfhame Learned to Hate Stories (2020); The Stolen Heir (2023); The Prisoner's Throne (2024)
- Author: Holly Black
- Country: United States
- Language: English
- Genre: Fantasy
- Publisher: Little Brown Books for Young Readers
- Published: January 2, 2018 – September 24, 2024
- Media type: Print

The Folk of the Air is a young adult fantasy book series by Holly Black, published by Little Brown Books for Young Readers. The story follows the journey of mortal girl, Jude Duarte, and faerie prince, Cardan Greenbriar, as they navigate the world of hate, betrayal, and contempt along with feelings for each other. The series is a New York Times Best Seller.

== Development ==
The series features appearances by characters from Black's previous Modern Tale of Faerie trilogy, as well as characters from her standalone novel The Darkest Part of the Forest, establishing that those books take place in the same universe as The Folk of the Air series. Holly Black has also set her most recent book, ‘The Prisoner's Throne,’ in Elfhame. This book is the second in a duology and is preceded by ‘The Stolen Heir’.

== Books ==
No.	Title	Publication date	ISBN
1	The Cruel Prince	January 2, 2018	9780316310277
At seven years old, Jude Duarte and her twin sister Taryn are taken away to live with their half-sister Vivienne, after Vivienne's biological father Madoc, a fae, kills the twins' parents. A decade later, the trio lives in lives in Elfhame with Madoc's wife Oriana and son Oak, where the twins are tormented by Prince Cardan Greenbriar and his friends, Nicasia, Valerian and Locke. After nearly drowning in another bullying attempt, Cardan's older brother, the crown Prince Dain, employs Jude as his spy for her human ability to lie in exchange for immunity to fae glamour. Jude begins to practice her immunity to poisons and works with the Court of Shadows, consisting of the Roach, The Bomb and The Ghost. Embroiled in an affair with Locke, Jude discovers an acorn containing a message to protect the heir of the throne, found in the dress of Liriope, Locke's deceased mother. As the coronation approaches, a coup emerges from Prince Balekin and Madoc; the latter killing Dain, and the former's plans of his sisters crowning him dissolve, leaving Cardan as the only remaining heir of the Greenbriar line capable of crowning Balekin. After placing Cardan under house arrest, they learn that Oak is the son of Liriope and Dain, placing him next in line for the throne. The two devise a plan to thwart Oak's crowning by Madoc by having Cardan doing so, allowing Jude to rule as Regent rather than Madoc. Balekin orchestrates a banquet, and Jude and Cardan arrive, where Jude disarms Madoc in the process. A bomb is released, and the crown is tossed to Cardan, who is crowned by Oak instead, leaving the former enraged.
2	The Wicked King	January 8, 2019	9780316310338
Five months after Cardan's crowning as king, he remains under Jude's submission, who operates as his seneschal. Despite Cardan's pledge of being under Jude's control for "one year and one day", Jude hopes she can extend her power until her adoptive brother Oak, is of age to return to rule Elfhame. Jude receives word from her spies, who have intercepted a note from Balekin, who requests that Cardan visits him in prison. Jude goes herself, learning that Balekin and Orlagh, queen of the Undersea and Nicasia's mother, have been exchanging messages seeking to undermine Cardan's rule. Meanwhile, Jude's twin sister, Taryn, asks Jude to attend her wedding to Locke; Nicasia admits to shooting an arrow at Cardan, inadvertently wounding him in her attempt at killing the girl he was in bed with. Orlagh decrees that Nicasia will marry Cardan and that there will be punishment if he disobeys. Upon hearing this, Madoc calls Jude to ensure that Cardan does not marry Nicasia, with Madoc offering Oak as bait, to which Jude refuses. Despite it, Jude decides to work with Madoc to ensure Oak's safety from Orlagh, in the process accidentally revealing her and Cardan's deal. Orlagh has joined forces to make Balekin king by marrying him off to Nicasia, and having the blacksmith Grimsen forge a new crown for him. The Ghost reveals his betrayal by Orlagh's forces, leaving Jude held captive in the Undersea, and Cardan makes concessions to get Jude back, devising Balekin to be free and live as the ambassador to Elfhame from the Undersea. Cardan exchanges the Court of Termites's defense as the price for Jude's ransom. Jude figures out that Orlagh and Balekin are planning to murder Cardan, who poisoned. Balekin requests the crown in exchange for the antidote, but Jude ultimately kills him in a duel. When Jude returns to Cardan to administer the antidote, she discovers Madoc had Taryn pose as Jude to fool Cardan into giving Madoc half of the army. Later that night, Cardan asks Jude to give him his free will back and marry him, which will allow her to give him any royal orders she wants and bypass her needing to order him around to get things done, and that they can remained married until Oak is fit to rule. They perform the ceremony themselves, and Jude releases him from his service to her. The next morning, Orlagh arrives at the palace, seeking Cardan's accountability for Jude killing Balekin. When she threatens war,Cardan uses his magic to trap Nicasia in a tree, with Orlagh relenting in exchange for Cardan releasing her daughter. To appease Orlagh and maintain peace with the Undersea, Cardan exiles Jude to the mortal world with Vivi and Oak, despite her protests that she is the Queen of Faerie.
3	The Queen of Nothing	November 19, 2019	9780316310406
A prophecy was made at Cardan Greenbriar's birth that he will be the last of Eldred's offspring and will be the destruction of the crown and the ruination of the throne, where out of the boy's spilled blood can a great ruler rise, but only after the aforementioned prophecy comes to pass. As a result of this prophecy, Cardan was poorly treated and raised in squalor. Jude returns home to find that Taryn has come from the Faerie realm, impregnated by her husband Locke, whom she killed after being abused by him. With an inquest to be conducted on his murder, Taryn requests that Jude returns to Faerie as Taryn herself in order to bypass the fae glamour, so "Taryn" can tell the truth. Despite the risk from her banishment, Jude agrees, and is questioned by the court. Cardan, however, recognizes her immediately upon her arrival, questioning why she did not respond to his letters. In the midst of their reunion, Madoc's army attacks and kidnaps Jude under the pretense of rescuing Taryn, taking Jude to a camp belonging to the Court of Teeth. Like Balekin, Madoc has requested Grimsen's forging skills, but to smith a blade that would disrupt the power of Cardan's Blood Crown. Oriana discovers Jude and helps her escape, where Jude later finds The Ghost imprisoned as Locke's blackmailed dowry to Madoc. Jude escapes but is stabbed by Madoc in the process, returning home only to have Madoc and his army challenging Cardan to a duel. Madoc and Cardan argue about the philosophy of the monarchy; Madoc questions if Cardan has the loyalty of the people, who challenges that free will as opposed to the crown will ultimately decide who is their ruler. Cardan fulfills the prophecy by then breaking the accursed crown, where he then transform into a snake. Grimsen declares that in this form, Cardan will poison the land and only his death can stop it; he is then killed by Cardan, who burrows himself into the ground as he escapes. Jude tries to formulate how to maintain her rule as Queen against Madoc's threat and solve Cardan's curse. Madoc and the Court of Teeth give Jude a bridle that would be able to control Cardan, later learning that they gave her incorrect instructions on how to use it, which would have tied her to the snake and left Madoc in control. A plan is made for Jude to capture the snake, but instead of putting the bridle on him, she cuts the snake's head off. The second part of the prophecy – only out of his spilled blood can a great ruler rise – is fulfilled when Cardan, in his original form, emerges from the pool of the snake's blood. In the epilogue, Cardan and Jude are crowned and they banish Madoc to live in the human world.

=== Companions ===
- A Visit to the Impossible Lands (2018) is a companion short story told from the perspective of Kaye and Roiben from the Modern Tale of Faerie series as they witness the events of The Cruel Prince unfold. The story was released as a bonus exclusive for the Barnes & Noble Exclusive Edition of The Cruel Prince.
- The Lost Sisters (2018) is a companion novella from the perspective of Jude's twin sister Taryn Duarte. It is available only as an audiobook and an e-book.
- Letters from Cardan to Jude in Exile (2019) were a series of letters addressed to Jude from Cardan set in between the events of The Wicked King and The Queen of Nothing. Initially released as exclusive bonus content for the Barnes & Noble edition of The Queen of Nothing, the letters were released in e-book form three years after its initial print release.
- How the King of Elfhame Learned To Hate Stories (2020) is a companion novella that focuses on Cardan's perspective.
- The Honest Folk (2024) is a short story that was released as part of the anthology Faeries Never Lie: Tales to Revel In which focuses on the characters of Heather and Vivienne.

=== Spin-offs ===
- The Stolen Heir (2023) is the first book of The Stolen Heir Duology, set in the perspective of Suren, the runaway queen of The Court Of Teeth, now nicknamed Wren. The book shows the aftermath of High Queen Jude's judgment on Wren and her mother, Lady Nore. Suren, the person with the only real power to control her mother, now lives feral in the woods. But she is unexpectedly pulled into a mission with the, now grown, Prince Oak. Now, Wren has to guard her heart against the boy she once knew but cannot trust, as well as confronting all the horrors she thought she'd left behind.
- The Prisoner's Throne (2024) is the second book in The Stolen Heir Duology, set in the perspective of Oak, the heir to the throne of Elfhame, who is now suffering alone in the prisons of the very girl whose heart he stole and the one whom he deceived to save his father. Finding himself full of regret and other complicated feelings, Oak is now searching for a chance to find Wren and seek her forgiveness and a chance to tell her that he actually loved her and still does. Suddenly, he finds himself low on time when a message from Elfhame informs him of his rescue in 3 days time. Oak finds himself in a tough spot as he must find a way to clear up things with Wren and stop an incoming war between the ones he loves the most.

== Future ==
A new illustrated novel called A Conspiracy of Charming Monsters: Illustrated tales from Elfhame is to be expected around 3 November 2026. The novel is written by Holly Black and illustrated by Solenne Songer.

=== Special editions ===
The Folk of the Air series has been reprinted into special editions by multiple companies including, illumicate, Fairyloot, and Barnes and Noble. In 2022 Litjoy also announced the complete special editions of The Folk of Air series. Two years later, Litjoy released a special edition for The Stolen Heir.

=== Film adaptation ===
In June 2017, it was announced that The Cruel Prince had been optioned for a film adaptation produced by Universal Pictures and Michael De Luca.
