= Jessica Lanan =

American illustrator and author

Jessica Lanan is an American illustrator and author of children's books.

== Biography ==
Lanan received a Bachelor of Arts degree from Scripps College. She was inspired to work as a professional artist when on a yearlong trip through Asia. She is a member of the Society of Children's Book Writers and Illustrators.

The first book she illustrated was Good Fortune in Wrapping Cloth (2011).

Lanan, who lives in Boulder, Colorado, is married.

== Critical reception ==
Five books she illustrated have received starred reviews from Kirkus Reviews: Out of School and Into Nature (2017), Finding Narnia (2019), A Kid of Their Own (2020), The Lost Package (2021), and Jumper (2023).

School Library Journal gave a starred review to The Fisherman & the Whale (2019). Publishers Weekly gave starred reviews to The Lost Package and The Story I'll Tell. Booklist gave The Lost Package a starred review.

== Selected works ==
=== As illustrator ===
- Good Fortune in a Wrapping Cloth by Joan Schoettler. Shen’s Books, 2011.
- The Spirit Post by Amelia Cardenas. Squatch Productions, LLC. 2015.
- Finding Narnia: The Story of C. S. Lewis and His Brother by Caroline McAlister. Roaring Brook Press, 2019.
- Just Right: Searching for the Goldilocks Planet by Curtis Manley. Roaring Brook Press, 2019.
- A Kid of Their Own by Megan Dowd Lambert. Charlesbridge, 2020.
- The Lost Package by Richard Ho. Roaring Brook Press, 2021.
- Out of School and Into Nature: The Anna Comstock Story by Suzanne Slade. Sleeping Bear Press, 2017.
- The Story I'll Tell by Nancy Tupper-Ling. Lee & Low Books, 2022.

=== As author and illustrator ===
- The Fisherman & the Whale. Simon & Schuster Books for Young Readers, 2019.
- Jumper: A Day in the Life of a Backyard Jumping Spider. Roaring Brook Press, 2023.
