= Tricia Springstubb =

American writer (born 1950)

- Born: September 15, 1950 (age 74); New York City, New York, U.S.
- Occupation: Author
- Years active: 1980-present
- Known for: Children's books and young adult literature
- Notable work: What Happened on Fox Street; Looking for True; Cody (series)
- Website: www.triciaspringstubb.com/index.html

Tricia Springstubb (born September 15, 1950, New York City, U.S.) is an American writer of children's, middle grade, and young adult literature. She has also published work in literary magazines.

Springstubb is also a critic who writes for The Plain Dealer.

== Biography ==
Tricia Springstubb was born on September 15, 1950 in New York City, U.S. She graduated from University at Albany, SUNY.

Springstubb lives in Cleveland Heights, Ohio with her husband. She has three daughters.

== Bibliography ==
- (1980). My Minnie is a Jewel. United States: Carolrhoda Books.
- (1981). The Blueberry Troll. United States: Carolrhoda Books.
- (1981). Give and Take. United States: Little, Brown.
- (1982). The Moon on a String: A Novel. United States: Little, Brown.
- (1982). The Magic Guinea Pig. United States: W. Marrow.
- (1984). Which Way to the Nearest Wilderness?. United States: Little, Brown.
- (1987). Eunice Gottlieb and the Unwhitewashed Truth about Life. United States: Delacorte Press.
- (1988). Eunice (the Egg Salad) Gottlieb. United States: Delacorte Press.
- (1989). With a Name Like Lulu, who Needs More Trouble?. Bulgaria: Delacorte Press.
- (1989). Why Can't Life be a Piece of Cake?. United Kingdom: HarperCollins Publishers Limited.
- (1990). Lulu Vs. Love. United States: Delacorte Press.
- (1991). Two Plus One Makes Trouble. United States: Scholastic.
- (1993). Cleveland for Kids. United States: Cleveland Arts Consortium.
- (1993). Pet Sitters Plus Five. United States: Little Apple.
- (1995). Two Plus One Goes A.P.E.. United States: Scholastic.
- (2002). The Vietnamese Americans. United States: Lucent Books.
- (2010). What Happened on Fox Street. United States: Balzer + Bray.
- (2016). Every Single Second. United States: Balzer + Bray. With Sudyka, D.
- (2011). Mo Wren, Lost and Found. United States: HarperCollins.
- (2013). Phoebe and Digger. United States: Candlewick Press.
- (2015). Moonpenny Island. United States: Balzer + Bray. Illustrated by Gilbert Ford.
- (2015). Cody and the Fountain of Happiness. United States: Candlewick Press. Illustrated by Eliza Wheeler.
- (2017). Cody and the Mysteries of the Universe. United States: Candlewick Press.
- (2017). Cody and the Rules of Life. United States: Candlewick Press.
- (2018). Cody and the Heart of a Champion. United States: Candlewick Press
- (2020). Khalil and Mr. Hagerty and the Backyard Treasures. United States: Candlewick Press.
- (2021) The Most Perfect Thing in the Universe.
- (2022) Looking for True. United States: Margaret Ferguson Books

== Awards and nominations ==
In November 2009, she received the Iowa Review Prize for fiction for her story In the Dark. Springstubb was profiled as one of Cleveland Magazine's Most Interesting People in 2011.
