= Black Heart (Black novel) =

2012 novel by Holly Black

- First edition
- Author: Holly Black
- Language: English
- Genre: Fantasy
- Publisher: Margaret K. McElderry Books
- Publication date: April 3, 2012
- Publication place: United States
- Pages: 304
- Preceded by: Red Glove

Black Heart is third book in The Curse Workers, a series about Cassel Sharpe written by Holly Black. The book received positive reviews.
