= Red Glove (novel) =

2011 novel by Holly Black

- First edition
- Author: Holly Black
- Language: English
- Genre: Fantasy
- Publisher: Margaret K. McElderry Books
- Publication date: April 5, 2011
- Publication place: United States
- Pages: 336
- Preceded by: White Cat
- Followed by: Black Heart

Red Glove is the 2011 second book in The Curse Workers, a series about Cassel Sharpe written by Holly Black. The novel was a finalist for the 2011 Cybils Award for Young Adult Fantasy and Science Fiction.

== Reception ==
Red Glove received a starred review from Publishers Weekly, who called the novel "smart and well-executed." Kirkus Reviews called the novel a "dark, disturbing fare, crafted by a master."

Locus include Red Glove on their "2011 Recommended Reading List" for young adult novels. The novel was also a finalist for the 2011 Cybils Award for Young Adult Fantasy and Science Fiction.
