= Ironside (Black novel) =

2007 novel by Holly Black

Ironside: A Modern Faerie Tale
- Cover of the paperback edition
- Author: Holly Black
- Cover artist: Sammy Yuen, Jr.
- Series: Modern Tale of Faerie
- Genre: Young adult urban fantasy
- Published: April 2007 Margaret K. McElderry Books
- Publication place: United States
- Media type: Print (hardcover)
- Pages: 323 (first ed.)
- ISBN: 0-689-86820-0
- OCLC: 70866840
- LC Class: PZ7.B52878 Iro 2007
- Preceded by: Valiant

Ironside: A Modern Faerie Tale is a young adult urban fantasy novel by Holly Black. It was published in 2007 by the Margaret K. McElderry imprint of Simon & Schuster and is recommended for readers aged "14 and above".

The novel is a direct sequel to Black's first book Tithe (2002). It is considered to complete a trilogy called [A] Modern Tale of Faerie, literally the subtitle of the intervening second book Valiant. According to online excerpts from a 2006 Locus interview and short biography of Black, "Valiant (2005) is another contemporary fantasy loosely related to Tithe, and Ironside, a direct sequel to Tithe, is forthcoming." Black told Locus then that she calls Tithe "suburban fantasy, as opposed to urban fantasy. It's set on the Jersey Shore, and it's got faeries."

== Plot summary ==
In the realm of Faerie, the time has come for Roiben's coronation. In the midst of the Unseelie Court, pixie Kaye is sure of one thing only, her love for Roiben. But when Kaye, drunk on faerie wine, declares herself to him, he sends her on a quest. Now Kaye cannot see or speak with Roiben unless she can find the one thing which is a faerie who can tell a lie.

Corny and Kaye decide to watch Ellen, her mother, perform in a bar. A man is watching Kaye. Realising that the man is a faerie, Corny attempts to get information from him in the bathroom. Kaye finds them and the faerie curses Corny so that anything he touches withers.

Miserable and convinced she belongs nowhere, Kaye decides to tell her mother the truth that she is a changeling, long ago left in place of a human daughter. Her mother's shock and horror sends Kaye to the Seelie Court to find her human counterpart and bring her back to Ironside. Silarial offers Kaye protection to and from the court in order to offer her a deal, and a boy who can see through faerie enchantments, Luis (introduced in Valiant, the preceding book in the series), is arranged to lead them there.

Silarial offers Roiben a lifeline: defeat her champion and win seven years of peace while also placing Roiben's sister Ethine on the throne instead, or die trying. While she is in the court, the Seelie queen attempts to make Kaye use Roiben's name to force him back into the Seelie Court by bribing her with the return of the "real" Kaye. Kaye uses a fake name, then escapes with Ethine as a hostage. Kaye returns to her grandmother's house in order to retrieve her things where she finds her replacement, Kate, in her bedroom. Kaye talks with her mother, who accepts her as her daughter. Her grandmother thinks that Kate is Kaye's sister whom she was never told about.

Corny later gives Ethine back in exchange for the release of Luis' brother, but his brother has already been killed and all the faeries return is his body. Luis attempts to use Corny's curse to kill himself in grief, but he puts Corny's hand on his tears, washing away the curse in salt water. Kaye then realises that Roiben is going to have to battle Ethine, not the knight Talathain as they assumed. She goes to warn Roiben. In order to speak to him, Kaye must complete his quest, and she does, claiming that she can lie, which in itself is an untruth.

Roiben goes ahead with the duel anyway, glad of the warning. He beats Ethine but asks her who she will pass the crown on to before killing her. The Seelie queen objects to this, but Roiben declares that his sister has the right to declare her successor even with her last breath. Silarial tells him that she may dictate the terms as the Bright Court will easily defeat the Unseelie Court in a fight; Roiben asks her if she will void their previous bargain, and Silarial agrees. At this, Roiben reveals that he has gathered an army from the exiled fae, which surround the Seelie Court, but Silarial then threatens Kaye's life. Ethine kills Silarial with the sword she had been given, declaring that Silarial is no longer her Queen. Ethine now holds the crown because she was Silarial's heir, but she chooses to give it to Roiben, saying "Take it and be damned." Roiben states that his sister's hate was a fair price to pay for peace and now rules both the Seelie and Unseelie Courts; peace will be held as long as he controls both courts.

Kaye strikes a deal with Kate to teach her about being a human in return for being taught about being a faerie, in an attempt to help the girl adjust. Kaye tells Roiben that she plans to open a coffee shop in Ironside with Corny and Luis, who are now dating, and spend half her time in Faery; she reveals that she was able to say she could lie because "lying" can also mean lying on the ground.

== Characters ==
- Kaye: A changeling pixie who is in love with the Lord of the Night Court Roiben; is given an impossible quest when she declares herself to him.
- Roiben: Former Knight of both the Seelie and Unseelie Courts, now the Lord of the Night Court. He is in love with Kaye, but in order to keep her safe from the evils of the Unseelie Court he gives her an impossible quest.
- Corny: Kaye's best friend; is scared of most faeries because he was controlled by them many times; is gay; reads manga; is attracted to Luis.
- Luis: An orphan teen boy who lives with his younger brother, Dave, whom he is trying to protect from the fae; is attracted to Corny; has the Sight (ability to see through glamour).
- Silarial: Queen of the Bright Court and Roiben's former mistress, whom Roiben once loved.
- Ethine: Roiben's sister, who was made heir to the Bright Court but later gives up the throne out of spite.
- Lutie-loo "Lutie", Kaye's faerie, is like Kaye’s conscience.
- Ellen, Kaye’s mother, Kate’s real mother.
- Kate, Ellen's real child, is Kaye's counterpart.
- Adair: A knight of the Bright Court, he is sent into Ironside by Silarial to do her bidding. He first encounters Corny whilst searching for Kaye, who then tortures him for information. He is later dispatched in a fit of rage by Corny in the woods of the Bright Court.
- Talathain: A Knight of the Bright Court. In love with Ethine.

== Reception ==
Ironside: A Modern Faerie Tale got mostly positive reviews. Preisendorfer for School Library Journal called it "magical", a "dark beauty", and "enchanting", and said the "narration is spot-on for every character." Lynn Rutan in "Books for Older Readers" wrote that this novel is "dark, edgy fantasy, and a must-purchase". Sarah Wood from Teenreads said she "enjoyed the book", noting Black's subtlety: "the real world is never that simple, and neither is Black's vision of faeries."

Eva Mitnick says Black has "an authentic street voice." Wood says, "Kaye's ignorance through the novel is easy to manipulate." Rutan for Booklist said that "characters struggle to shape their identities, quintessential coming-of-age" and called Ironsides a novel about "betrayal, loyalty, and love."

== Allusions ==
- While in Roiben's chambers, Kaye flips through "an Emma Bull paperback she'd loaned him" – referencing another urban fantasy novel, War for the Oaks.
- The Unseelie herald is named "Thistledown" – a possible nod to the faerie king of Lost-Hope in Jonathan Strange & Mr. Norrell.
- In the coffee shop, Corny mentions larping, crosses his arms, and says "Now I'm obfuscating, and you have to pay my tab." – a reference to Vampire: The Masquerade.
