= Valiant (novel) =

2005 novel by Holly Black

Valiant: A Modern Tale of Faerie
- Cover Photo of the paperback edition.
- Author: Holly Black
- Cover artist: Sammy Yuen, Jr.
- Series: Modern Tale of Faerie #2
- Genre: Young adult fantasy
- Publisher: Simon & Schuster
- Publication date: June 2005
- Publication place: United States
- Media type: Print (hardcover)
- Pages: 314 pp (1st ed. hardcover)
- ISBN: 9780689868221 (1st ed. hardcover)
- OCLC: 64442595
- LC Class: PZ7.B52878 Val 2005
- Preceded by: Tithe
- Followed by: Ironside

Valiant: A Modern Tale of Faerie, is a young adult urban fantasy novel by Holly Black. It was published in 2005 by Simon & Schuster Books for Young Readers, who recommended it for ages "14 up". Valiant is a sequel to Black's debut novel Tithe (2002), and the second in a trilogy that is sometimes called [A] Modern Tale of Faerie (2002–2007).

Where Tithe is set mainly on the Jersey Shore, Valiant is set in New York City. The two novels share a major premise, or fictional universe, but Valiant also works as a stand-alone story. According to online excerpts from a 2006 Locus interview and short biography of Black, "Valiant (2005) is another contemporary fantasy loosely related to Tithe, and Ironside, a direct sequel to Tithe, is forthcoming."

Valiant won the inaugural Andre Norton Award as the year's best U.S. science fiction or fantasy for young adults as selected by vote of the Science Fiction and Fantasy Writers of America (SFFWA). It was also a finalist for the annual Mythopoeic Award for children's literature, as Tithe had been.

== Plot summary ==
Valerie Russell, a high school student, discovers that her single mother and her boyfriend, Tom, are having an affair. Val runs away to New York City and meets up with a group of teen-squatters, including Lolli (as in lollipop), Dave, and Luis. Val earns the nickname "Prince Valiant" after she helps a drag queen locate her shoe.

She soon learns about the group's contact with a troll, Ravus, who lives beneath a bridge, as in the fairy tale "Three Billy Goats Gruff". Ravus makes "Never", which faeries in exile take in order to resist iron. These exiles are dispersed throughout the city, and Dave and Luis must deliver the glamour to them. Never can be used as a highly addictive drug by humans, who can then use magic for a short time. Lolli and Dave introduce Val to "Nevermore", as they call it, and she, like the other squatters, is soon hooked.

Ravus, despite Val's first impressions, is much kinder than he appears. He begins to teach her swordplay and the bond between them strengthens. Val's mounting problems and addiction take a nasty turn, and the trust Ravus has in her is threatened.

Many of the Seelie court exiles are being poisoned and Ravus is blamed. When Val's friend Ruth arrives, attempting to convince Val to come home, Val agrees, but not before saying goodbye to Ravus. She cannot find him in his alcove, so she finds Ruth, Lolli and Luis by Belvedere Castle. Luis, making sexual advances toward Lolli very unexpectedly, informs her Dave has angrily stormed off. A tree-spirit faerie leads Val to a festival by the water, where faeries and humans called "sweet tooths" run around freely. Ravus arrives, and delirious and half-starved, Val kisses him. Mabry arrives as well, and Val realizes she is the one who killed all the Fey. She tries to tell Ravus but Mabry cuts in, telling Ravus Val has been stealing his potions, and she flees as he becomes enraged.

Ruth and Val go to find evidence of Mabry's murders, and they find a harp in which Mabry has strung the hair of those she's killed, including that of Tamson, Ravus' best friend and Mabry's ex-lover. When the hairs are plucked, they sing of their deaths, revealing that Mabry is responsible for Tamson's death and Ravus' exile. They discover that Dave has been impersonating Luis, uncontrollably high off Never he got from Mabry after putting poison in Ravus' potions for her. Dave takes off his glamour and falls unconscious. Ruth rushes him to the hospital as Lolli runs off, and the real Luis and Val search for Ravus so he can cure Dave. They find that Mabry has cut out Ravus' heart. Val pulls back the curtains and turn Ravus to stone, and Val and Luis pursue Mabry into the Unseelie Court. She challenges Mabry to a first-blood duel for Ravus' heart with Ravus' glass sword, and after a moment's decision to never use Never again, fights Mabry on talent alone and stabs her in the throat. She and Luis place Ravus' heart back into his chest, healing him. Ravus gives Luis the tools to go heal his brother, and he and Val admit their love for one another.

Eventually, Val decides to leave the streets and return home with Ruth. She and Ravus continually see one another, and Val says she plans to go to New York for college so she can see him. Val is happy her life is back to normal, with the exception of having a faerie for a boyfriend and never being able to introduce him to her mother.
