= Holly Black =

American author (born 1971)

- Black at Worldcon 2026
- Born: Holly Riggenbach; November 10, 1971 (age 54); West Long Branch, New Jersey, U.S.
- Citizenship: U.S.
- Education: The College of New Jersey (BA); Rutgers University
- Occupations: Writer; editor; producer
- Spouse: Theo Black (m. 1999)
- Writing career
- Period: c. 2000–present
- Genres: Children's, young adult literature, short stories, fantasy, horror
- Website: blackholly.com

Holly Black (née Riggenbach; born November 10, 1971) is an American writer and editor best known for her children's and young adult fiction. Her most recent work is the New York Times bestselling young adult Folk of the Air series. She is also well known for The Spiderwick Chronicles, a series of children's fantasy books she created with writer and illustrator Tony DiTerlizzi, and her debut trilogy of young adult novels officially called the Modern Faerie Tales. Black has won a Nebula Award, a Newbery Honor, and a Mythopoeic Award. The Spiderwick Chronicles was adapted into a 2008 film and into a 2023 television series, for which Black received a nomination for the Children's and Family Emmy Award for Outstanding Young Teen Series.

== Early life and education ==
Black was born in West Long Branch, New Jersey in 1971, and during her early years her family lived in a "decrepit Victorian house." She graduated from Shore Regional High School in 1990. Black graduated with a B.A. in English from The College of New Jersey in 1994. She worked as a production editor on medical journals including The Journal of Pain while studying at Rutgers University-New Brunswick.

She considered becoming a librarian as a backup career, but writing drew her away. She edited and contributed to the role-playing culture magazine d8 in 1996. Some of the inspiration to write young-adult fiction came from authors such as Garth Nix, Tamora Pierce and Francesca Lia Block. In regards to the fairy tale aspect of her work, she was inspired by creators such as Tanith Lee, Angela Carter, Terri Windling, Ellen Datlow, Pamela Dean, Ellen Kushner, Charles de Lint and Emma Bull.

In 1999, she married her high school sweetheart, Theo Black, an illustrator and web designer. In 2008, she resided in Amherst, Massachusetts.

== Literary career ==
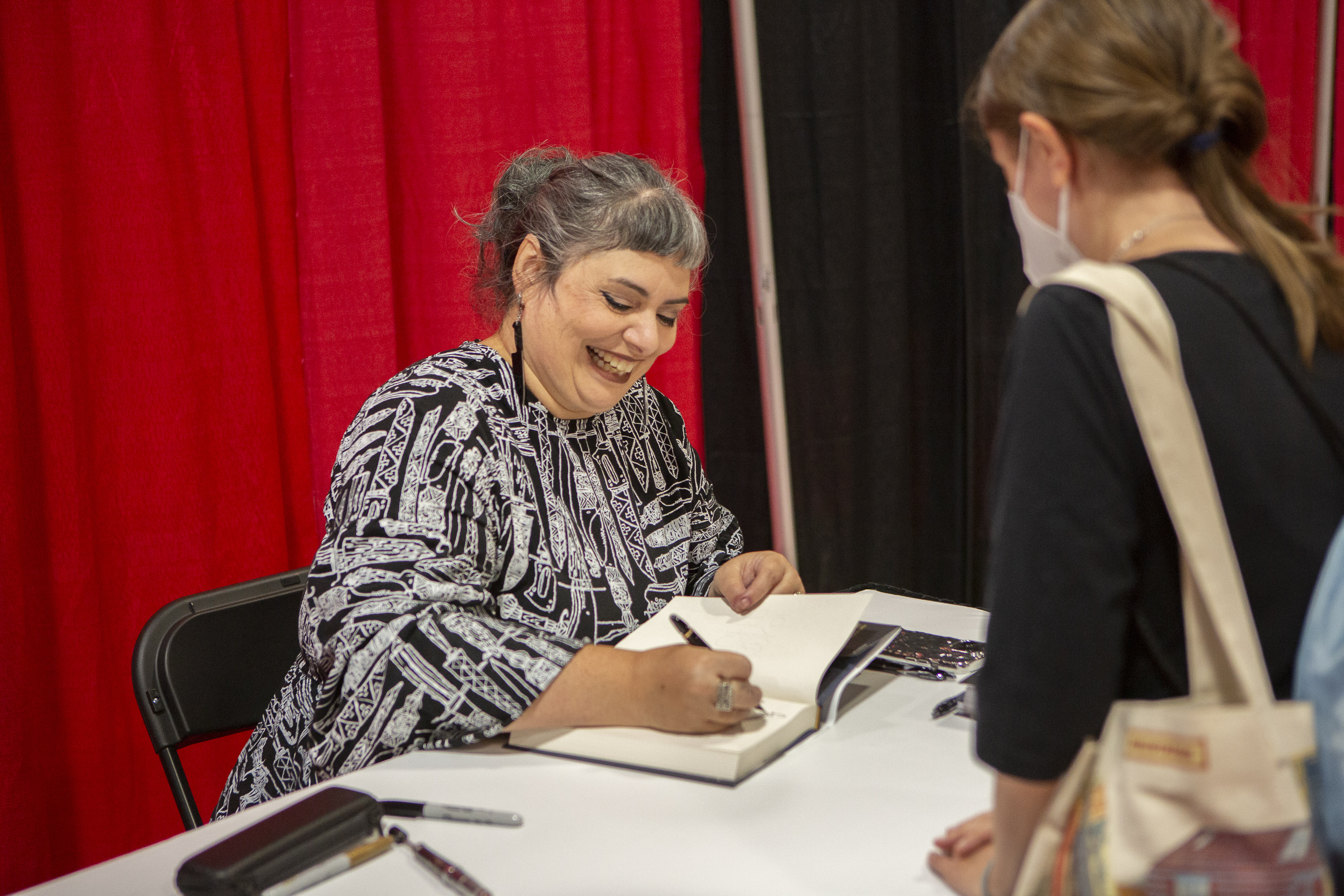
Black at the National Book Festival in 2022

=== Modern Faerie Tales ===
Black's first novel, Tithe: A Modern Faerie Tale, was published by Simon & Schuster in 2002. There have been two sequels set in the same universe featuring different casts. The first, Valiant (2005), won the inaugural Andre Norton Award for Young Adult Science Fiction and Fantasy. By vote of Locus readers for the Locus Awards, Valiant and Ironside (2007) ranked fourth and sixth among the year's young-adult books.

=== The Spiderwick Chronicles ===
In 2003, Black published the first two books of The Spiderwick Chronicles, a collaboration with artist Tony DiTerlizzi. The fifth and last book in the series reached the top of the New York Times Bestseller list in 2004. A film adaptation of the series was released in 2008, of which Black was co-executive producer.

=== The Curse Workers ===
White Cat, the first in her Curse Workers Series, was published in 2010. White Cat was followed by Red Glove (2011) and the trilogy concluded with Black Heart in 2012. In 2011, Black stated that the Curse Workers books had been optioned by Vertigo Pictures and producer Mark Morgan.

=== Magisterium ===
In 2012, Scholastic acquired a five-book series written by Black and Cassandra Clare to be called Magisterium. Its first volume, The Iron Trial, was published on September 9, 2014. The final book in the series, The Golden Tower, was published in 2018.

=== The Folk of the Air ===
The Cruel Prince, first book of The Folk of the Air published in 2017, was critically acclaimed and nominated for the Locus Award and the Lodestar Award. The sequel, The Wicked King (2018), debuted at the No. 1 position of the New York Times Bestseller List and was also nominated for the Lodestar Award. The Queen of Nothing released in November 2019. With that release the series debuted at No. 3 on the New York Times Bestseller List.

Black was interviewed regarding the Folk of the Air series for an article in the March 2024 issue of BookPage magazine before the publication of her 2024 novel The Prisoner's Throne. She discussed the themes of the series with interviewer Jessica Peng. When asked whether or not she anticipated writing the Stolen Heir duology after the Folk of the Air series was published, Black replied, "When I got to Queen of Nothing, I realized I wanted to write about Oak and Suren at some point in the future... I don't think knowing that I wanted to revisit those characters changed the course of anything in the Folk of the Air books, but perhaps I did think of them a little more because of it".

=== The Charlatan Duology ===
Book of Night, published by Tor Books in 2022, was Black's first foray into adult fantasy. Generally well received both critically and commercially, the novel won a Dragon Award the same year. The sequel and final book in the duology, Thief of Night, was released in 2025.

=== Standalones ===
A standalone novel, The Coldest Girl in Coldtown, was released by Little, Brown and Company in September 2013. Black published a short story of the same name in the vampire anthology The Eternal Kiss: 13 Vampire Tales of Blood and Desire. The Coldest Girl in Coldtown was an Andre Norton Award finalist in 2013.

Doll Bones was published in May 2013, and was awarded a Newbery Medal and a Mythopoeic Award.

The Darkest Part of the Forest was published in 2015.

Black has also written dozens of short works and co-edited at least three anthologies of speculative fiction.

== Bibliography ==
=== Adult novels ===
The Charlatan Duology

- Book of Night (2022)
- Thief of Night (2025)

=== Young adult novels ===
The Modern Faerie Tales

- Tithe: A Modern Faerie Tale (2002)
- Valiant: A Modern Tale of Faerie (2005)
- Ironside: A Modern Faery's Tale (2007)

The Curse Workers

- White Cat (2010)
- Red Glove (2011)
- Black Heart (2012)

The Folk of the Air

- The Cruel Prince (2018)
- The Lost Sisters (2018, companion novella)
- The Wicked King (2019)
- The Queen of Nothing (2019)
- How the King of Elfhame Learned to Hate Stories (2020, companion novella)

Novels of Elfhame

- The Stolen Heir (2023)
- The Prisoner's Throne (2024)

Standalone

- The Coldest Girl in Coldtown (2013)
- The Darkest Part of the Forest (2015)

=== Middle grade novels ===
The Spiderwick Chronicles, Black and Tony DiTerlizzi, illus. DiTerlizzi

- The Field Guide (2003)
- The Seeing Stone (2003)
- Lucinda's Secret (2003)
- The Ironwood Tree (2004)
- The Wrath of Mulgarath (2004)
- Beyond the Spiderwick Chronicles
  - The Nixie's Song (2007)
  - A Giant Problem (2008)
  - The Wyrm King (2009)
- Accompanying books
  - Arthur Spiderwick's Notebook of Fantastical Observations (2005)
  - Arthur Spiderwick's Field Guide to the Fantastical World Around You (2005)
  - The Spiderwick Chronicles: Care and Feeding of Sprites (2006)
  - The Chronicles of Spiderwick: A Grand Tour of the Enchanted World, Navigated by Thimbletack (2007)

Magisterium, Black and Cassandra Clare, illus. Scott Fischer

- The Iron Trial (2014)
- The Copper Gauntlet (2015)
- The Bronze Key (2016)
- The Silver Mask (2017)
- The Golden Tower (2018)

Standalone

- Doll Bones (2013, Newbery Medal Honor book), illus. Eliza Wheeler
- Heart of the Moors: An Original Maleficent: Mistress of Evil Novel (2019)

=== Graphic novels and comics ===
The Good Neighbors, illus. Ted Naifeh

- The Good Neighbors: Kin (2008)
- The Good Neighbors: Kith (2009)
- The Good Neighbors: Kind (2010)

Lucifer

- Lucifer vol. 1: Cold Heaven (2016, trade paperback)
- Lucifer vol. 2: Father Lucifer (2017, trade paperback)
- Lucifer vol. 3: Blood in the Streets (2017, trade paperback)

=== Picture books ===
- Sir Morien: The Legend of a Knight of the Round Table, Black and Kaliis Smith (2023), illus. Ebony Glenn

=== Short fiction ===
Collections

- The Poison Eaters and Other Stories (2010), illus. Theo Black
- A Conspiracy of Charming Monsters (2026), illus. Frostbite Studios

Short stories

- "Hades and Persephone" (1997) in Prisoners of the Night
- "The Night Market" (2004) in The Faery Reel: Tales from a Twilight Realm
- "Heartless" (2005) in Young Warriors: Stories of Strength
- "Going Ironside" (2007) in Endicott Journal of Mythic Arts
- "In Vodka Veritas" (2007) in 21 Proms
- "Reversal of Fortune" (2007) in The Coyote Road: Trickster Tales
- "The Poison Eaters" (2007), The Restless Dead: Ten Original Stories of the Supernatural, ed. Deborah Noyes
- "Paper Cuts Scissors" (October 2007) in Realms of Fantasy
- "The Coat of Stars" (2007) in So Fey
- "Virgin" (2008) in Magic in the Mirrorstone
- "The Boy Who Cried Wolf" (2009) in Troll's Eye View: A Book of Villainous Tales
- "The Coldest Girl in Coldtown" (2009) in The Eternal Kiss: 13 Vampire Tales of Blood and Desire
- "A Very Short Story" (2009) in Half-Minute Horrors
- "The Dog King" (2010) in The Poison Eaters and Other Stories
- "The Land of Heart's Desire" (2010) in The Poison Eaters and Other Stories
- "The Arn Thompson Classification Review" (2010) in Full Moon City
- "Sobek" (2010) in Wings of Fire
- "Lot 558: Shadow of My Nephew by Wells, Charlotte" (2011) in The Thackery T. Lambshead Cabinet of Curiosities.
- "Everything Amiable and Obliging" (2011) in Steampunk!
- "The Perfect Dinner Party" (with Cassandra Clare, 2011) in Teeth
- "The Rowan Gentleman" (with Cassandra Clare, 2011) in Welcome to Bordertown
- "Noble Rot" (2011) in Naked City: New Tales of Urban Fantasy
- "Coat of Stars" (2012) in Bloody Fabulous
- "Little Gods" (2012) in Under My Hat: Tales from the Cauldron
- "Millcara" (2013) in Rags & Bones: New Twists on Timeless Tales
- "Sisters Before Misters" (2014) (with Sarah Rees Brennan and Cassandra Clare) in Dark Duets: All-New Tales of Horror and Dark Fantasy
- "Ten Rules for Being an Intergalactic Smuggler (the Successful Kind)" (2014) in Monstrous Affections: An Anthology of Beastly Tales
- "1UP" (2015) in Press Start to Play
- "The Honest Folk" (2024) in Faeries Never Lie: Tales to Revel In

=== Anthologies edited ===
- Geektastic: Stories from the Nerd Herd (2009), eds. Black and Cecil Castellucci
- Zombies vs. Unicorns (2010), eds. Black and Justine Larbalestier
- Welcome to Bordertown (2011), eds. Black and Ellen Kushner

=== Poetry ===
- "The Third Third: Israfel's Tale" (1996) in d8 Magazine
- "Bone Mother" (Autumn 2004) in Endicott Journal of Mythic Arts

== Awards ==
- 2006: Andre Norton Award for Young Adult Science Fiction and Fantasy, Valiant: A Modern Tale of Faerie
- 2014: Mythopoeic Award in Children's Literature, Doll Bones
- 2014: Newbery Medal Honor Book, Doll Bones
- 2015: Indies Choice Book Award—Young Adult Book of the Year, The Darkest Part of the Forest
- 2023: Inkpot Award
