= Tithe (novel) =

2002 young-adult fantasy novel by Holly Black

Tithe: A Modern Faerie Tale
- First edition (US)
- Author: Holly Black
- Cover artist: Greg Spalenka
- Series: Modern Tale of Faerie
- Genre: Young adult fantasy
- Publisher: Simon & Schuster
- Publication date: October 2002
- Publication place: United States
- Media type: Print (hardcover)
- Pages: 310 (first ed.)
- ISBN: 0-689-84924-9
- OCLC: 48140506
- LC Class: PZ7.B52878 Ti 2002
- Followed by: Valiant

Tithe: A Modern Faerie Tale is a young-adult fantasy novel written by Holly Black. It was published in 2002 by Simon & Schuster, who recommended it for "ages 12 up". Sequels – Valiant (2005) and Ironside (2007) – completed a trilogy that is sometimes called [A] Modern Tale of Faerie, the subtitle of volume two.

The novel is set on the Jersey Shore and Black calls it "suburban fantasy, as opposed to urban fantasy".

Tithe was one of five finalists for the annual Mythopoeic Fantasy Award in children's literature.

== Plot summary ==
Tithe follows the story of sixteen-year-old American, Kaye Fierch, a young nomad who tours the country with her mother's rock band. The book begins in Philadelphia, at a gig her mother's band Stepping Razor is playing in a seedy bar in Philadelphia. After her mother's boyfriend and guitarist, Lloyd, attempts to stab her mother under the enchantment of Nephamael (a knight of the Unseelie Court) her mother takes her back to Kaye's grandmother's house in New Jersey to stay.

Once at her grandmother's house, Kaye begins to look for her old "imaginary" friends she had during her childhood, faeries named Lutie-Loo, Spike, and Gristle. However, she fails to find them and, begins to suspect that they were simply figments of her imagination. Her suspicions dissolve when she finds and saves the life of Roiben, a faerie knight, by pulling an iron-tipped arrow from his chest. In return, he grants her three truthfully answered questions about anything she chooses, which she does not immediately use. Soon after this, Spike and Lutie-Loo contact her and warn her that Roiben is a murderer who has killed Gristle. As revenge, Kaye tricks Roiben into telling her his full name (she later learns that faeries can be controlled by their true names).

Later on, her friends tell her that she is a changeling and that she should keep her human appearance, because the Unseelie Court wishes to use her as a "Tithe" in order to bind the Solitary Fey to the Court's queen, Nicnevin. Since Kaye is not mortal, the ritual will be forfeit, and the fey whom the Unseelie Court wishes to bind will go free. Kaye attempts to control her newfound abilities by enlisting the help of a kelpie to teach her how to use magic. She is soon kidnapped by a group of fairies, as planned and is taken to the Unseelie Court to go through the sacrificial ceremony. Before the ceremony, Roiben has a dress made for her and allowed her to stay with him that night, when they acknowledge each other's feelings. At the climax of the ceremony, Kaye uses Roiben's full name and orders him to free her from her bonds before she is killed, resulting in a bloodbath between Roiben and the court, and then fleeing to safety. He kills the queen of the Unseelie Court and many of her guards.

Kaye and Roiben spend the day at Kaye's home, and discover that strange events are affecting the mortal world. Odd reports of mauling and kidnappings are reported on the news and Roiben makes Kaye understand that this is a result of the solitary fey being free for the next seven years. Kaye receives a call from her friend Janet, inviting her to come to a Halloween rave held at the waterfront, she tries to persuade her not to go but fails. After a failed attempt to receive help from her "imaginary" faerie friends, Roiben and Kaye attend the rave. They are separated, and Kaye successfully locates her friends, but briefly leaves them to apologize to Janet's boyfriend for bewitching him earlier in the novel. However, she finds that the kelpie who lives near the waterfront has taken Janet into the water to kill her. It is suggested that Janet went with him out of loneliness and a desire to get revenge on her boyfriend for going off with Kaye. Kaye follows but is too late and she manages to convince the kelpie to relinquish her body. Roiben finds Kaye mourning for her friend and gets her home.

The next morning, she and Roiben travel to the Seelie Court's camp some distance away to see if Corny is there. They reach a dead end, but discover that the knight (Nephamael) has proclaimed himself the king of the Unseelie Court. Roiben is suspicious of the situation and thinks that it is a trap for Kaye and him. Later, Roiben's suspicions are proved correct when they enter the Unseelie Court. Nephamael, who had discovered Roiben's true name from Spike before killing him, uses it to take control over Roiben. He orders him to seize Kaye, but Roiben uses trickery to let her get away. Kaye then devises a plan to poison Nephamael, while Corny and Roiben amuse him. She goes through with it; however, before Nephamael is dead, the Seelie Queen arrives, hoping to take over the court (right after her arrival Corny goes insane and stabs Nephamael multiple times, ultimately killing him). Roiben prevents the Queen's takeover attempt by claiming the throne as his.

== Characters ==
- Kaye Fierch – Kaye is the headstrong and independent protagonist of Tithe. She is secretly a changeling put in place of the real Kaye Fierch who resides in the Bright Court with Lady Silarial, though she herself is unaware of this until two-thirds of the way through the novel. She is intelligent, mature, and full of guile but sometimes naive.
- Ellen Fierch – Kaye's mother. A struggling rock singer, she tours the country with her rock band, Stepping Razor, until an attack by Nephamael in the form of a controlled Lloyd forces her to move back in with her own mother temporarily. Fiery spirited but caring, she is more of a friend to Kaye than a parental figure.
- Roiben (Rath Roiben Rye) – A noble Seelie knight traded to the Unseelie Queen before the beginning of the novel as part of a truce agreement between the courts. He is a strong fighter and feared by many. He has a strong attraction to Kaye for reasons he does not initially understand. He is one of the main supporting characters along with Corny. Inwardly hating the cruelty he is forced to perform for his new Queen, he thus harbours deep feelings of self-loathing and self-despair.
- Corny (Cornelius Stone) – Janet's older brother. He is quite antisocial and even entertains murderous fantasies, but he ends up bonding with Kaye. Along with Roiben, he is one of the main supporting characters. He is a computer geek who loves comic books and manga - yaoi in particular. He is gay and out to his sister and family, and comes out early on to Kaye. He enthusiastically helps Kaye when she discovers her faerie nature, but he is eventually seduced, enchanted, and captured by Nephamael who makes him his lover and slave. Corny seems to have a taste for submission and a certain level of pain, but he gets more than he bargained for with Nephamael.
- Janet Stone – Corny's younger sister and Kaye's best friend since elementary school. Suspects Kaye of flirting with Kenny, as Kenny is mentioned flirting with numerous girls in the novel. She is oblivious to her friend and brother's faerie dealings. Later on in the plot a kelpie drowns her during a rave that Kaye and Roiben attend. Kay tries to save her but is unable to.
- Lutie-Loo – One of Kaye's faerie friends from childhood. She is the classic 'Tinkerbell', being only as few inches high with cornsilk hair and wings.
- Spike – One of Kaye's faerie friends from childhood. Harbours strong dislike and distrust of Roiben. He is killed by Nephamael towards the end of the novel after giving him information in the hopes of gaining his favour.
- Gristle – The last of Kaye's faerie friends from childhood. He is killed by Roiben during a 'fox hunt' after stealing cakes from the Unseelie Court and does not appear in the novel.
- Nephamael – Initially a knight of the Unseelie court, he is traded for Roiben as part of the Queen's truce. He hates his new "home" and delights in taking the throne of the Night Court for himself at the end of the novel. He is cruel, manipulating and ruthless, and takes great pleasure in toying with humans and lesser faeries, especially when he meets Corny, whom he makes his pet. He ultimately pays the price for his cruelty, slain by Corny in a fit of murderous insanity whilst under the influence of magic.
- Silarial – The Seelie Queen, sister to Nicnevin and Roiben's former mistress. It is believed she orchestrated the whole plot to kill Kaye and free the solitary fey.
- Nicnevin – The Unseelie Queen, sister to Silarial. Beautiful as she is evil, she passes her days plotting against the Seelie kingdom and amusing herself and her subjects with cruel pastimes. She selects Kaye for the Tithe in order to gain control of the Soitary Fey, though the sacrifice is interrupted by Kaye taking control of Roiben during the ceremony. She is slain by Roiben during the ensuing chaos.
- Kenny – Janet's boyfriend, he becomes attracted to Kaye because she unwittingly enchanted him.
- The Kelpie – A murderous waterhorse and one of the Solitary Fey, who teaches Kaye magic and how to make a glamour in return for a carousel horse companion. He kills Janet later in the novel, luring her away from a party on the Pier.

== Critical reception ==
Emily Lauer reviewed Tithe for the Mythopoeic Society in Mythprint. She opened and closed, "I used to hate the formula reviews ... Tithe, for all that is new and unique, can be easily described ... if I was to use the formula: Take the ambiance of Weetzie Bat [1989], part of the plot of Moorchild [1997], add two parts fangirl and one part Shakespearean rhetoric, place in New Jersey and stir; I would not be far from the truth." Lauer observed that Tithe "is most decidedly a girl's book" and its plot is "fairly complex" for ages 12–14. In New Jersey Black's "sense of place is astute". Like the moorchild, Kaye is a changeling who "goes underground to discover her roots. The drama and action are mostly there, in the faery world, where Kaye must discover everybody's loyalties and try to stay alive." The faery world is believable. The "characters are well-read, and refer to fantasy fiction of all mediums", which works well.
