= List of awards and nominations received by Fringe =

Fringe awards and nominations
Awards and nominations
Award	Wins	Nominations
American Society of Cinematographers	0	1
Australians in Film Awards	1	1
Critics' Choice Television Awards	1	3
EWwy Awards	2	3
Golden Reel Awards	0	8
NewNowNext Awards	0	1
People's Choice Awards	1	2
Primetime Emmy Awards	0	2
Satellite Awards	0	2
Saturn Awards	7	15
Teen Choice Awards	0	9
TCA Awards	0	1
Visual Effects Society	1	3
Webby Awards	3	3
Writers Guild of America Awards	0	2

Totals (Note: Certain award groups do not simply award one winner. They acknowledge several different recipients, have runners-up, and have third place. Since this is a specific recognition and is different from losing an award, runner-up mentions are considered wins in this award tally. For simplification and to avoid errors, each award in this list has been presumed to have had a prior nomination.)
- Wins: 16
- Nominations: 56

Fringe is an American drama series that aired on Fox from September 9, 2008, to January 18, 2013. It has been nominated for a variety of different awards including two Primetime Emmy Awards, fifteen Saturn Awards (winning seven), eight Golden Reel Awards, two Satellite Awards, and two Writers Guild of America Awards.

The Fringe series follows an FBI Fringe Division team based in Boston, Massachusetts. The team uses unorthodox "fringe" science and FBI investigative techniques to investigate "the Pattern", a series of unexplained and often ghastly occurrences taking place all over the world. Joshua Jackson and Jasika Nicole both garnered nominations for their starring and co-starring roles. Leonard Nimoy received a Saturn Award, for his guest stint on the show. "Pilot" is the most nominated single episode of the series, receiving nominations at five different awards ceremonies and six nominations total. The episode garnered a VES award, and was nominated for the series' first Emmy.

== Emmy Awards ==
The Primetime Emmy Awards are presented annually by the Academy of Television Arts & Sciences.

Technical awards are presented annually the day before the Primetime Emmy Award event is held. They are called the Creative Arts Emmy Awards. In 2009, Fringe has been nominated for two awards, honoring its special effects.

=== Creative Arts Emmy Awards ===
Year	Category	Nominee(s)	Episode	Result
2009	Outstanding Special Visual Effects for a Series	Kevin Blank, Jay Worth, Andrew Orloff, Johnathan Banta, Steve Graves, Jonathan Spencer Levy, Scott Dewis, Steve Fong, Tom Turnball	"Pilot"	Nominated
2010	Outstanding Sound Editing for a Series	Paul Curtis, Rick Norman, Bruce Tanis, Paul Apelgren, Shelley Roden, Rick Partlow	"White Tulip"	Nominated

== Golden Reel Awards ==
The Golden Reel Awards are presented annually by the Motion Picture Sound Editors. Fringe has been nominated six times at this ceremony, and has yet to claim a single prize.

Year	Category	Nominee(s)	Episode	Result
2009	Best Sound Editing in Television Long Form – Dialogue & ADR	Bruce Honda, Bob Redpath, Chris Reeves; David M. Cowman, Mitchell C. Gettleman, Tom A. Harris, Virginia Cook McGowan	"Pilot"	Nominated
2009	Best Sound Editing in Television Short Form – Dialogue & ADR	Tom A. Harris, Christopher Reeves, Gabrielle Reeves, Jay Keiser	"Safe"	Nominated
2009	Best Sound Editing in Television Long Form – Sound Effects & Foley	Walter Newman, Bob Redpath, Micheal Ferdie; Kenneth Young, Adam Johnston, David Werntz; Ron Salaises, Casey Crabtree, Michael Crabtree	"Pilot"	Nominated
2010	Best Sound Editing in Television Short Form – Dialogue & ADR	Thomas A. Harris, Christopher Reeves, Gabrielle Reeves, Jay Keiser	"Unleashed"	Nominated
2010	Best Sound Editing in Television Long Form – Sound Effects & Foley	Thomas A. Harris, Michael Ferdie, Nick Neutra, Robert Kellough, Joe Schultz, Sanaa Cannella, Cynthia Merrill	"Unleashed"	Nominated
2010	Best Sound Editing Short Form in Television – Music	Paul Apelgren	"Night of Desirable Objects"	Nominated
2011	Best Sound Editing Short Form in Television – Music	Paul Apelgren	"The Box"	Nominated
2011	Best Sound Editing Short Form in Television – Musical	Paul Apelgren	"Brown Betty"	Nominated

== Satellite Awards ==
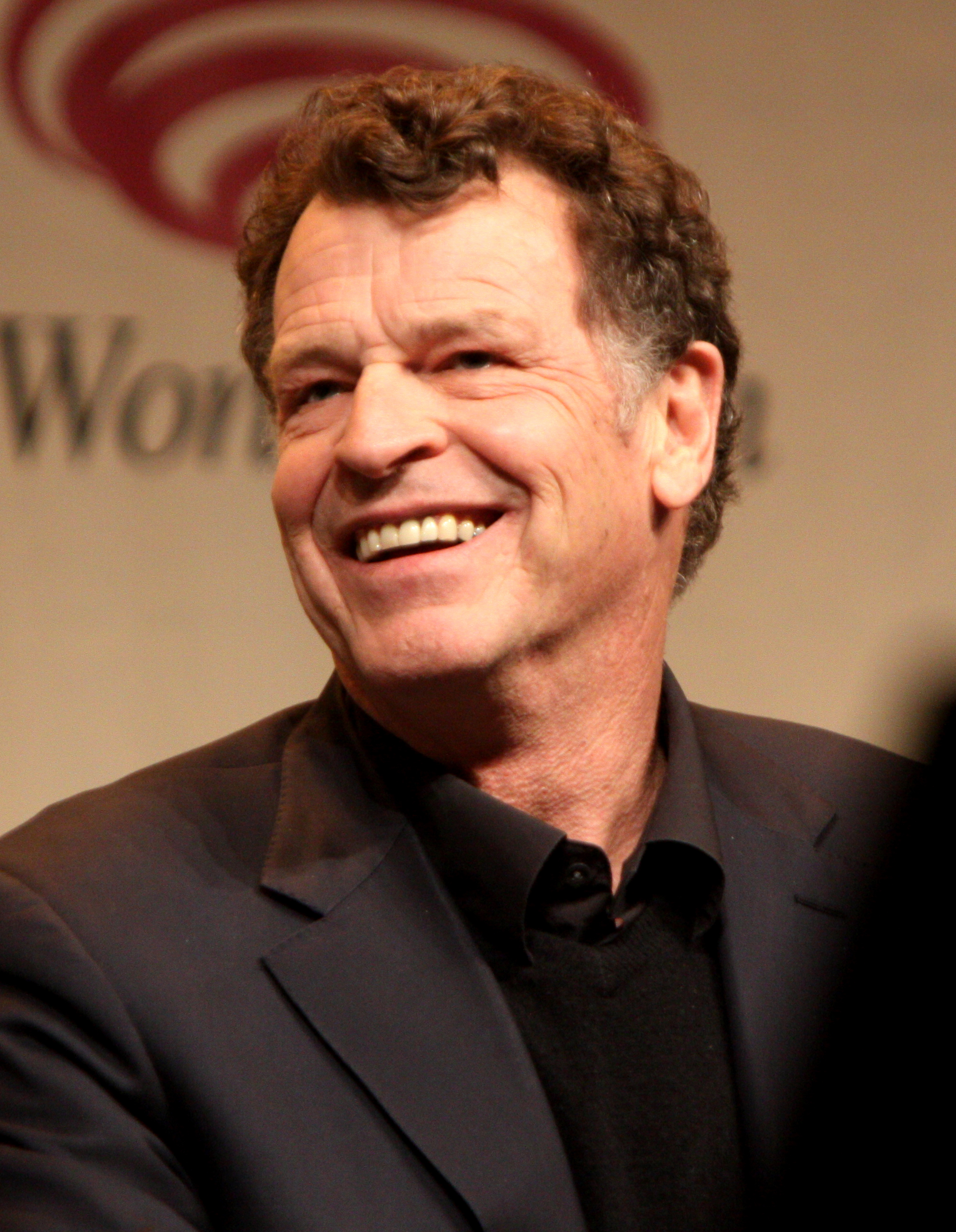
John Noble is the only cast member to have been nominated for a Satellite Award.

The Satellite Awards, formerly known as the Golden Satellite Awards, are presented both for cinema and television. Fringe has been nominated twice for John Noble's portrayal of Doctor Walter Bishop

Year	Category	Nominee(s)	Result
2008	Best Supporting Actor – Series, Miniseries, or Television Film	John Noble	Nominated
2009	Best Supporting Actor – Series, Miniseries, or Television Film	John Noble	Nominated

== Saturn Awards ==
The Saturn Awards are presented by the Academy of Science Fiction, Fantasy and Horror Films and honor science fiction and fantasy films and television shows. For work on the first season, Fringe was nominated for two Saturn Awards, one for Best Network Television Series and another for Anna Torv's performance as Agent Olivia Dunham. The following year, Fringe was again nominated in the same categories, as well as Leonard Nimoy for his guest work as Dr. William Bell. However, this time Fringe received accolades for Best Actress and Best Guest Star on Television.

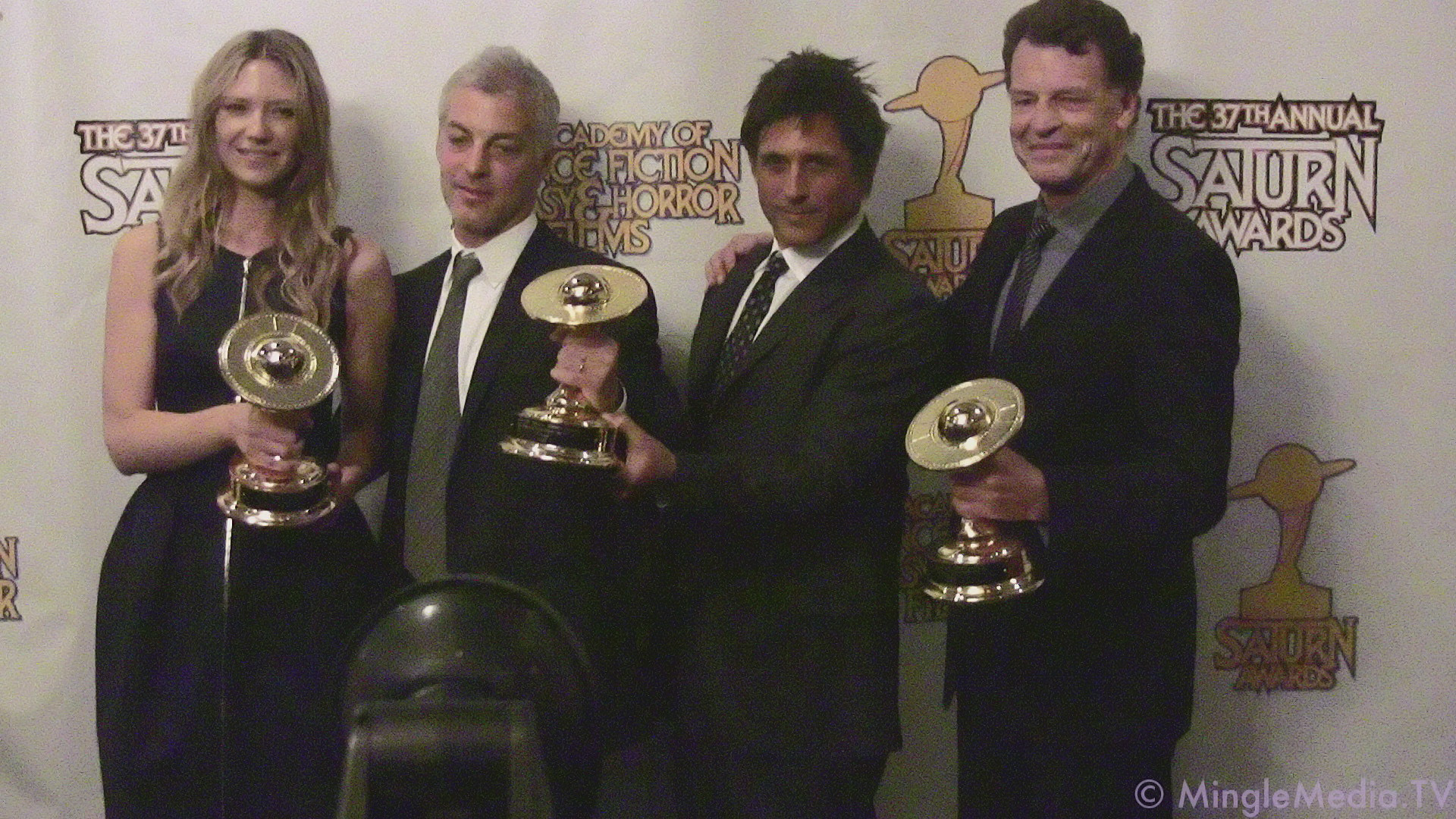
Cast of Fringe holding their 2011 Saturn awards

Year	Category	Nominee(s)	Result
2008	Best Network Television Series		Nominated
2008	Best Actress on Television	Anna Torv	Nominated
2009	Best Network Television Series		Nominated
2009	Best Actress on Television	Anna Torv	Won
2009	Best Supporting Actor on Television	John Noble	Nominated
2009	Best Guest Star on Television	Leonard Nimoy	Won
2010	Best Network Television Series		Won
2010	Best Actress on Television	Anna Torv	Won
2010	Best Supporting Actor on Television	John Noble	Won
2010	Best Supporting Actor on Television	Lance Reddick	Nominated
2010	Best Guest Star on Television	Seth Gabel	Nominated
2012	Best Network Television Series	Fringe	Won
2012	Best Actress on Television	Anna Torv	Won
2012	Best Supporting Actor on Television	John Noble	Nominated
2012	Best Guest Star on Television	Orla Brady	Nominated

== Writers Guild of America Awards ==
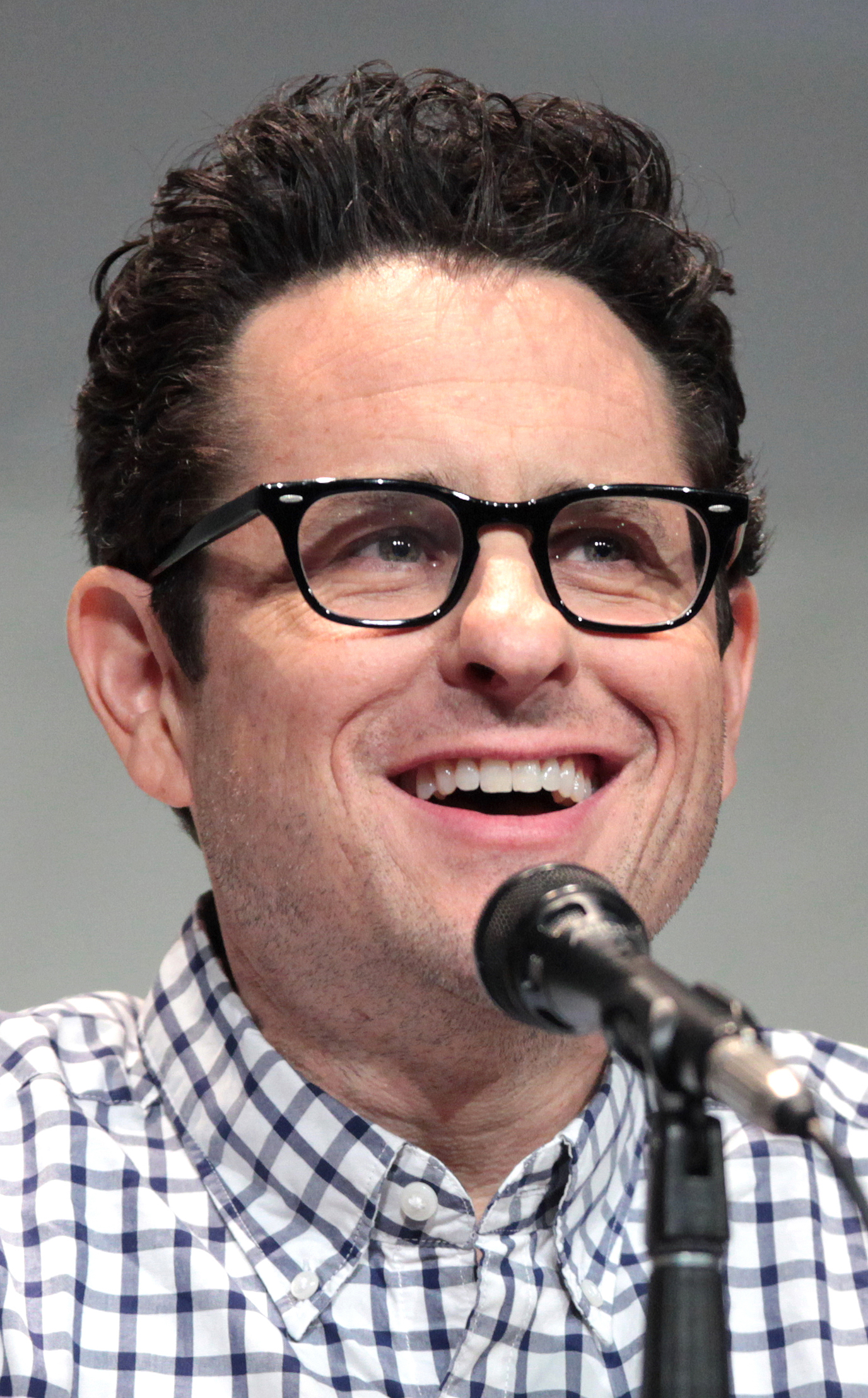
Series co-creator J. J. Abrams has been nominated for two WGA Awards.

The Writers Guild of America Awards are presented annually by the Writers Guild of America. Fringe has been nominated for two awards.

Year	Category	Nominee(s)	Episode	Result
2009	Television: Long Form – Original	J. J. Abrams, Alex Kurtzman, Roberto Orci	"Pilot"	Nominated
2009	Television: New Series	^{See Below}		Nominated

^2009 "Long Form - Original" Nominees J.J. Abrams, Jason Cahill, Julia Cho, David H. Goodman, Felicia Henderson, Brad Caleb Kane, Alex Kurtzman, Darin Morgan, J. R. Orci, Roberto Orci, Jeff Pinkner, and Zack Whedon.

== Other awards ==
Fringe has claimed massive success achievement in award categories praising the series as a whole, and has also laid claim to numerous acting accolades. Fringe has had success in being nominated for various visual effects and cinematography awards. Fringe's official website's content as well as the website itself, have garnered numerous honors. "Pilot" is the most nominated episode of the series for visual effects and cinematography.

Award	Year	Category	Nominee	Result	Ref.
ASC Awards	2008	Outstanding Achievement in Cinematography in Movies of the Week/Miniseries/Pilot for Broadcast	Michael Bonvillain (for "Pilot")	Nominated	
Australians in Film Awards	2009	Breakthrough Award	Anna Torv	Won	
Critics' Choice Television Award	2011	Best Drama Series	Fringe	Nominated	
Critics' Choice Television Award	2011	Best Actress in a Drama Series	Anna Torv	Nominated	
Critics' Choice Television Award	2011	Best Supporting Actor in a Drama Series	John Noble	Won	
EWwy Awards	2009	Best Supporting Actor in a Drama Series	John Noble	Nominated	
EWwy Awards	2010	Outstanding Drama Series	Fringe	Won	
EWwy Awards	2010	Best Supporting Actor in a Drama Series	John Noble	Won	
NewNowNext Awards	2009	Brink of Fame: Actor	Jasika Nicole	Nominated	
People's Choice Awards	2009	Favorite New TV Drama	Fringe	Nominated	
People's Choice Awards	2011	Favorite Sci-fi/Fantasy TV Show	Fringe	Won	
Teen Choice Awards	2009	Choice TV: Breakout Show	Fringe	Nominated	
Teen Choice Awards	2009	Choice TV Actor: Drama	Joshua Jackson	Nominated	
Teen Choice Awards	2009	Choice TV: Breakout Star Female	Anna Torv	Nominated	
Teen Choice Awards	2010	Choice TV Show: Fantasy/Sci Fi	Fringe	Nominated	
Teen Choice Awards	2010	Choice TV Actor: Fantasy/Sci Fi	Joshua Jackson	Nominated	
Teen Choice Awards	2010	Choice TV Actress: Fantasy/Sci Fi	Anna Torv	Nominated	
Teen Choice Awards	2012	Choice TV Show: Fantasy/Sci Fi	Fringe	Nominated	
Teen Choice Awards	2012	Choice TV Actress: Fantasy/Sci Fi	Anna Torv	Nominated	
Teen Choice Awards	2012	Choice TV Actor: Fantasy/Sci Fi	Joshua Jackson	Nominated	
Television Critics Awards	2009	Outstanding New Program of the Year	Fringe	Nominated	
VES Awards	2008	Outstanding Supporting Visual Effects in a Broadcast Program	Kevin Blank, Jay Worth, Andrew Orloff, and Barbara Genicoff (for "Pilot")	Won	
VES Awards	2009	Outstanding Visual Effects in a Broadcast Series	Jay Worth, Robert Habros, Andrew Orloff, and Eric Hance (for "Earthling")	Nominated	
VES Awards	2011	Outstanding Visual Effects in a Broadcast Series	Robert Habros, Andrew Orloff, Jay Worth, and Chris Wright	Nominated	
Webby Awards	2009	Honoree Best Writing	Fringemas	Honoree	
Webby Awards	2009	Honoree Television Website	Official Fringe Website	Honoree	
Webby Awards	2009	Honoree Video Remixes/Mashups	Fringemas	Honoree	
