= List of Shadowhunters episodes =

Shadowhunters is an American supernatural drama television series. The series is based on the book series The Mortal Instruments by Cassandra Clare, and developed for television by Ed Decter. It premiered in North America on Freeform. In December 2015, Netflix acquired global rights to Shadowhunters, excluding the U.S., making the series available as an original series a day after the U.S. premiere.

Shadowhunters follows Clary Fray (Katherine McNamara), who finds out on her birthday that she is not who she thinks she is but rather comes from a long line of Shadowhunters, human–angel hybrids who hunt down demons. The series is set in an urban and contemporary New York City. The show received a straight-to-series order on March 30, 2015, and premiered on January 12, 2016 on Freeform.

In June 2018, Freeform canceled the series after three seasons, but ordered two extra episodes to properly conclude the series' story. During the course of the series, 55 episodes of Shadowhunters aired over three seasons.

== Series overview ==
Season	Episodes		Originally released	
Season	Episodes		First released	Last released
1	13		January 12, 2016	April 5, 2016
2	20	10	January 2, 2017	March 6, 2017
2	20	10	June 5, 2017	August 14, 2017
3	22	10	March 20, 2018	May 15, 2018
3	22	12	February 25, 2019	May 6, 2019

== Episodes ==
=== Season 1 (2016) ===
No. overall	No. in season	Title	Directed by	Written by	Original release date	Prod. code	US viewers (millions)
1	1	"The Mortal Cup"	McG	Ed Decter	January 12, 2016	267314-1	1.82
On Clary Fray's eighteenth birthday, her mother, Jocelyn, is kidnapped. Soon after, Clary discovers that her mother belongs to a supernatural group called Shadowhunters, a half-angel/half-human race tasked to protect the Downworld (fairies, werewolves, vampires, and warlocks) from demons. Clary learns she also belongs to this race, after being saved by a fellow Shadowhunter named Jace – who then introduces her to his adoptive siblings Alec and Isabelle. Clary overhears her mother's friend, Luke, claim that he cares nothing about her or her mother. Clary is at a crossroads not knowing whom to trust – her best friend Simon or the Shadowhunters – to help save Jocelyn from Valentine, a dangerous rogue Shadowhunter.
2	2	"The Descent Into Hell Isn't Easy"	Mick Garris	Ed Decter & Hollie Overton	January 19, 2016 (Note: The second episode, "The Descent Into Hell Isn't Easy", was released online on January 12, 2016, after the premiere of the first episode.)	267314-2	1.01
The Circle has returned, as has Valentine. With the Shadowhunters searching for the Mortal Cup, the Institute is on alert. After Hodge tells Clary that Jocelyn was once a Circle member, they realize Clary's significance in the cause. Jace realizes Clary's memories are the only way to find Jocelyn and the Cup. Unfortunately, without her memories, they are unable to help her or the Shadowhunter team. Thus Jace, Isabelle, and a reluctant Alec take Clary and Simon to visit the powerful Silent Brothers in the City of Bones, where Clary fails to retrieve any memories but finds out her biological father is Valentine himself. Luke is worried about Clary's whereabouts, while Simon comes to terms with Clary's new life and gets kidnapped by vampires.
3	3	"Dead Man's Party"	Andy Wolk	Marjorie David	January 26, 2016	267314-3	0.98
The Shadowhunters plan to rescue Simon, who has been taken captive by vampires in exchange for the Mortal Cup. Jace, Isabelle, Alec, and Clary locate Simon's whereabouts to the Hotel Dumort, where he is being held by Camille Belcourt, Raphael Santiago and the rest of Camille's outfit. Alec and Jace have a dispute over Clary and her loyalty since her father is their enemy. Isabelle visits Meliorn, her Seelie lover, in order to extract information about the Hotel Dumort, so the group can get into the building unnoticed. The Shadowhunters retrieve Simon and he is reunited with Clary, but he appears to be turning into a vampire after drinking Camille's blood.
4	4	"Raising Hell"	Tawnia McKiernan	Michael Reisz	February 2, 2016	267314-4	0.96
Simon quarrels with Jace and leaves the Institute. The Shadowhunters lure warlock Magnus Bane out of hiding with a prized necklace, in order to gain his help in retrieving Clary's memories. Magnus and Alec are instantly attracted to each other. Magnus informs them that he fed the memories to a memory demon for safekeeping. The Shadowhunters track Magnus to his lair, where the Circle has attacked. Magnus transports the group to his loft, where they summon the demon. Alec's personal insecurities about his feelings for Jace disrupt the ritual when they are each asked to relinquish a beloved memory, forcing Clary to kill the demon before recovering any memories. Simon is plagued with visions of Camille and ends up returning to the Hotel Dumort.
5	5	"Moo Shu to Go"	Kelly Makin	Angel Dean Lopez	February 9, 2016	267314-5	0.95
The Lightwood family matriarch, Maryse, arrives at the Institute with a Seelie intel mission for Isabelle and Jace. Alec is ordered to watch over Clary, but she escapes the Institute for her old apartment to locate her mother's secret box – that once belonged to a "Jonathan Clark". Clary and Simon are subsequently kidnapped by werewolves while searching the apartment, to Alec's chagrin. Clary is interrogated about the location of the Mortal Cup, and the alpha werewolf threatens to kill Simon if she does not reveal the information. Jace, Isabelle, and Alec then head to rescue the two, after Simon calls for help. The Shadowhunters are assisted in their escape by an unlikely ally – werewolf Luke, who defeats his alpha and assumes the title.
6	6	"Of Men and Angels"	Oz Scott	Y. Shireen Razack	February 16, 2016	267314-6	0.98
Clary, Jace, and Simon take a mortally wounded Luke to Magnus for help. At Luke's insistence, Magnus informs Clary of the Circle's past and her mother's involvement with the group. Robert Lightwood arrives at the Institute, and he and Maryse task Isabelle with mending the Seelies' broken ties with the Clave and restoring the family name. When Isabelle informs Alec that their parents plan to marry him off, he angrily leaves the Institute for Magnus' loft. There, he, Magnus and the others save Luke's life with magic. Luke informs Clary that she had a brother, Jonathan Christopher, who died in a fire caused by Valentine. Clary then discovers one of her powers, making her realize she knows the whereabouts of Mortal Cup.
7	7	"Major Arcana"	J. Miles Dale	Peter Binswanger	February 23, 2016	267314-7	0.84
Clary reveals that the Cup is hidden in a tarot card that Luke took for safekeeping. When Luke goes to retrieve it from his desk at the precinct, he is detained by internal affairs officers due to demonic murders whose real killer was Valentine. While being questioned about his part in the demonic murders, Luke's boss is killed by a shapeshifter. Clary, Jace, Isabelle, and Alec enact a plan to obtain the Cup but are tracked by demons. When a demon posing as Jace attempts to take the Cup from Clary, she kills it. Afterward, Clary and the real Jace share a kiss at the Institute. Simon's odd behavior worries Maureen and his family, who fear he is on drugs. He returns to the Hotel Dumort looking for answers and is met by Camille.
8	8	"Bad Blood"	Jeremiah S. Chechik	Allison Rymer	March 1, 2016	267314-8	0.87
Raphael arrives at the Institute with Simon, who has been attacked and killed by Camille. He informs Clary that, unless Simon is staked or turned before sunset, his soul will be trapped for eternity. An envoy from the Clave, Lydia Branwell, arrives to temporarily take over the Institute. Valentine sends a Forsaken to attack the werewolf pack, but Luke kills it. While retrieving the corpse from Luke, Lydia inadvertently reveals to Alec that his parents are ex-Circle members. Isabelle performs a pathology test on the Forsaken and finds that it has angel blood. Alec decides to restore his family's honor by proposing to Lydia. Later, another Forsaken attacks Hodge and Alec at the Institute, but they eventually defeat it. Clary decides to bury Simon in order for him to turn into a vampire, but he emerges thinking of himself as a monster.
9	9	"Rise Up"	J. Miller Tobin	Hollie Overton	March 8, 2016	267314-9	0.95
Following the Forsaken attack, the Institute is on high alert. Lydia arrests Meliorn for supposedly leaking Shadowhunter information to Valentine. During his interrogation, Meliorn let's slip that Clary is in possession of the Mortal Cup. Jace, Isabelle, and Clary decide to take matters into their own hands to prevent the Cup from reaching the Clave. With the help of Magnus, the three Shadowhunters sneak the Cup out of the Institute. Later, Isabelle, Clary, Jace, Simon, Luke and Raphael team up to rescue Meliorn from his impending torture in the City of Bones. Afterward, Meliorn informs Clary that he can help find her father. Alec's siding with Lydia and the Clave causes rifts with his personal relationships, and Simon makes peace with his newfound status as a vampire.
10	10	"This World Inverted"	J. Miles Dale	Y. Shireen Razack	March 15, 2016	267314-10	0.78
Meliorn takes Clary and Jace to the Seelie realm where he reveals a portal to an alternate dimension. He tells Clary that if she locates another portal within this dimension, she will be transported to her father. However, when Clary arrives, she finds that Shadowhunters have ceased to exist in this peaceful world and may assimilate to Clary from that dimension. Jace and Meliorn protect the entrance to the dimension from demons, but when one slips through, Jace ventures in to stop it. With the help of Magnus, Clary finds the portal at the Institute, and she and Jace step through it. When they arrive at Valentine's hideout, they discover Jace's father, Michael Wayland, assumed to be dead at Valentine's hands, is being held captive there. In reality, Isabelle is arrested for the Meliorn mission, much to the anguish of Alec, who tries in vain to prevent her from being put on trial.
11	11	"Blood Calls to Blood"	Mairzee Almas	Marjorie David	March 22, 2016	267314-11	0.78
Clary, Jace and Michael Wayland head to Luke's for help. While there, Michael discloses the location of Valentine's new hideout – an abandoned hospital on Long Island. Jace, Michael, Luke, and Clary go to rescue a still-unconscious Jocelyn but are surrounded by demons. Michael takes the Mortal Cup to command the demons but then reveals himself to be Valentine in disguise. Clary subsequently reveals that Valentine is holding a duplicate Cup. Before fleeing through a portal, he informs Clary and Jace that Michael was always really Valentine even when he was raising Jace, and therefore Jace and Clary are siblings, saying this is why they were drawn to each other. Isabelle's trial begins, with Magnus as her defense attorney. During questioning, Lydia states that the trial is nonsense and withdraws the charges, but Inquisitor Herondale states that Isabelle will still be banished from Shadowhunter society if the Clave does not receive the Cup within 24 hours. Jace and Clary arrive back at the Institute with the Cup, dropping the charges against Isabelle.
12	12	"Malec"	James Marshall	Michael Reisz	March 29, 2016	267314-12	0.82
Jace is conflicted over his feelings for his sister Clary, and Alec is conflicted over his feelings for Magnus as his wedding approaches. Isabelle throws her brother a bachelor party, where Alec and Jace mend their broken bond. Jace and Clary are led by Magnus to visit Ragnor Fell, a former friend, and warlock, for help on waking Jocelyn, believing that he is the one who created the spell that she is under. A demon follows them and kills Ragnor, but before he dies, he tells them that the Book of the White holds the antidote. Isabelle invites Magnus to Alec's wedding; seeing him, Alec realizes that he cannot go through with the marriage. After apologizing to an understanding Lydia, he approaches Magnus and kisses him in front of the guests. Later, Maryse expresses her disappointment in Alec at publicly shaming them, though Robert offers support. Magnus finds that the Book of the White is in Camille's possession. Packing up to head back to Idris, Lydia retrieves the Cup from a safe but is attacked by Hodge. It is revealed that Hodge has stolen the Cup for Valentine in order to be freed from his binding curse.
13	13	"Morning Star"	J. Miles Dale	Peter Binswanger	April 5, 2016	267314-13	0.76
The Shadowhunters cannot prevent Hodge from giving the Mortal Cup to Valentine, and he proceeds with creating his Shadowhunter army. Valentine betrays Hodge by refusing him protection from the Clave after getting the cup. Jace and Alec hunt down Hodge with Luke's help and Jace chops off Hodge's hand in the ensuing battle. Jace then goes after Valentine with Hodge as a guide, sending the others to aid Clary. Clary, Isabelle, and Simon visit the Hotel Dumort to ask Camille, imprisoned for Simon's unlawful death, about the Book of the White. In exchange for her help, Camille demands that they break her out from her prison and provide a signed statement from Simon that he asked her to turn him into a vampire. Magnus, at his warlock loft, drafts the contract. The group then heads to Camille's apartment, where she believes the book was hidden by Dot. They do find the Book but are then ambushed by the Circle. Jace arrives to fight Valentine, but they are all captured. Jace agrees to join Valentine for the safe release of his friends. Back at the Institute, the devastated group uses the spell and wakes Jocelyn, who reunites with her daughter and Luke.

=== Season 2 (2017) ===
No. overall	No. in season	Title	Directed by	Written by	Original release date	Prod. code	US viewers (millions)
Part 1
14	1	"This Guilty Blood"	Matt Hastings	Michael Reisz	January 2, 2017	267314-14	1.19
Jace is held captive on Valentine's ship. He attempts to kill Valentine, but his victim turns out to be one of Valentine's thugs under a glamour, and Jace is punished for disloyalty. Maryse goes behind Lydia's back to the Clave, and representative Victor Aldertree, instated as the new head of the New York Institute declares Jace a criminal wanted dead or alive and the Institute is put on lockdown. Clary tells a newly awakened Jocelyn that Jace is her son, and she is shocked, having believed that JC (Jonathan Christopher) had died in a fire with his father. Valentine tells Jace that he experimented on him in-utero using demon blood to make him stronger, causing self-doubt in Jace. Valentine opens a portal to land, wanting Jace to break the accords and execute a rogue vampire. Jace refuses, but the vampire dies in the resulting altercation. When Jocelyn attempts to shoot Jace with a crossbow, Valentine steps in front of the shot. When she prepares for another shot, however, Jace supports a wounded Valentine and they escape.
15	2	"A Door Into the Dark"	Andy Wolk	Y. Shireen Razack	January 9, 2017	267314-15	0.75
Jocelyn defends her attempt on Jace's life by explaining the effect Valentine's experiments had on him as a baby. Alec blames Clary for Jace's actions. Upset, she seeks solace at the Brooklyn Academy of Art where she is kidnapped by Dot and taken to Valentine. With Clary missing, Jocelyn offers her assistance to Isabelle and Alec by providing adamas, a metal that can be used to track Jace using his and Alec's bond. At Camille's Indian residence, Simon and Magnus search for the vampire, whom Raphael is being pressured by the Clave to produce, and find some items from Magnus' past. With Dot's help, Jace and Clary jump off Valentine's ship, but not before the risky parabatai tracking renders Alec comatose.
16	3	"Parabatai Lost"	Gregory Smith	Peter Binswanger	January 16, 2017	267314-16	0.81
Magnus works to stabilize a failing Alec with magic, but only Jace can save him through their parabatai bond. After escaping from Valentine's ship, Clary loses Jace and returns to the Institute. Jace is hunted by werewolves, including a girl named Maia, who believes he has killed one of their own. Isabelle makes a deal with Aldertree in order to find Jace and save Alec's life. Magnus transports Alec to his loft, where Jace arrives to revive him. As the parabatai reunite, Clave representatives and Aldertree arrive and arrest Jace for high treason.
17	4	"Day of Wrath"	Joe Lazarov	Jamie Gorenberg	January 23, 2017	267314-17	0.64
Jace is imprisoned in the City of Bones, where he encounters Hodge. Valentine arrives to break him out, but Jace fights back. Valentine kills Hodge and steals the Soul Sword before escaping into a portal. Clary helps Alec and Isabelle search for a powerful demon with the ability to possess others and feed on their negative emotions, but it infiltrates the Institute. Raphael is tortured by Aldertree for Camille's whereabouts and goes to Magnus for help. With Camille's grave dirt found at her house in India, an emotionally conflicted Magnus summons his ex-girlfriend and sends her to the Clave. At the Institute, a possessed Alec kills Jocelyn, devastating Clary. The demon then inhabits Isabelle but Clary breaks its hold and succeeds in killing it.
18	5	"Dust, and Shadows"	Salli Richardson-Whitfield	Zac Hug	January 30, 2017	267314-18	0.58
Jace is freed from the City of Bones, but Aldertree, still suspicious of Jace for letting Valentine go with the Soul Sword, bans him from the field of duty. Unable to accept her mother's death, Clary seeks the help of a warlock named Iris Rouse to resurrect Jocelyn and swears a blood oath to provide a favor in return for the spell. Isabelle's wound from her possession is not healing, so Aldertree prescribes a drug named yin fen. Iris traps Clary with the intention of claiming her favor: mating her with a demon in order to create more warlocks. Jace, Isabelle, and Alec arrive to save her, but Clary creates a new rune that helps her escape. Simon struggles with his double life as he moves back home and eventually admits his vampirism to his mother, but his confession goes awry and Raphael wipes his mother's memory. The Shadowhunters hold a funeral for Jocelyn and some of the deceased Shadowhunters, and a distraught Luke wakes naked in the wilderness.
19	6	"Iron Sisters"	Michael Rohl	Allison Rymer	February 6, 2017	267314-19	0.65
Simon and Maia team up to find Luke and begin to form a bond. Alec and Magnus go on their first date and discover a disparity in their romantic pasts. Isabelle and Clary go to the Iron Sisters for help in defeating Valentine and meet Luke's sister, Cleophas. To enter the Citadel, the two must endure a trial which detects demon impurities; Clary passes, but Isabelle fails and is informed that yin fen she has been using is made of vampire venom. Maia and Simon find Luke and convince him to return to the pack. Cleophas tells Clary that the Soul Sword has a second purpose: it can kill all demon-blooded creatures, including Downworlders. Clary shows Cleophas her runic power, which Isabelle witnesses. Magnus and Alec decide to begin a relationship, despite their differences, but are surprised by Jace's appearance: he has left the Institute due to Aldertree's unfair treatment and asks to stay with Magnus. Later, Cleophas kills Magdelena, an Iron Sister, and activates a Circle rune, indicating her allegiance to Valentine.
20	7	"How Are Thou Fallen"	Ben Bray	Hollie Overton	February 13, 2017	267314-20	0.55
Cleophas tells Valentine of Clary's rune-creating ability, then approaches Luke and Clary, but her brother is unwilling to trust her. Simon goes on a wholly unsuccessful first date with Maia, and Isabelle, now addicted to yin fen, is caught by Magnus at the Hunter's Moon seeking the drug. She convinces Magnus her search is for a mission, and he tells her to go straight to the source: vampires themselves. Clary hears strange noises, and is convinced that Valentine is responsible. Alec, after going to Isabelle for advice, finds Magnus at his loft and the two consummate their relationship. Figuring out the noises Clary is hearing are the distress calls of an angel Valentine is holding captive, Jace, Clary, Luke, and Cleophas infiltrate his lair, and Clary creates a rune to free the angel. The angel shows Clary and Jace a vision of a cloaked figure destroying the Soul Sword.
21	8	"Love is a Devil"	Catriona McKenzie	Y. Shireen Razack	February 20, 2017	267314-21	0.67
Alec asks Magnus to hold his little brother Max's Rune Party at his loft, Magnus agrees. Simon confesses his love for Clary and they start dating. Isabelle is now getting her yin fen fix straight from the source by letting Raphael feed on her. Max's party is in full swing when things take a turn for the worse, and guests begin seeing their fears and insecurities manifest. Magnus determines that they have all been be-spelled by a hostile warlock and undoes the curse. Magnus identifies the culprit as Iris Rouse, captures her and sends her to Idris. However, Iris invokes the blood oath Clary swore her and instructs her to find the warlock child Madzie who has been kidnapped by Valentine. Jace and Clary tell their friends what they have learned of the Soul Sword and of Clary's runic abilities, which Magnus identifies marks her as angel-blooded, and thus able to activate the Soul Sword herself. Maryse tells Alec and Jace their father has been cheating on her.
22	9	"Bound by Blood"	Matt Hastings	Peter Binswanger	February 27, 2017	267314-22	0.52
Clary's hand suddenly begins to burn and turn to stone, a symptom of blood oath she swore to Iris Rouse. Clary goes to Magnus, who tells her that her only cure lies in finding Madzie. Maia, who overheard the conversation at the party and fears Clary's power to activate the Soul Sword and kill all Downworlders, tries to kill her. A Downworlder council meeting takes place where Meliorn and Raphael both agree that Clary must be killed, while Magnus and Luke disagree. Alec is searching for Isabelle, and Magnus, having figured out her yin fen addiction, sends him to Raphael. Alec discovers Isabelle being fed on, and the siblings quarrel after he punches Raphael; Magnus also expresses his displeasure with Raphael. Jace tracks Madzie and brings her back to heal Clary, but the young warlock portals Clary to Valentine. Jace and Simon find and save Clary, but Simon is captured by Valentine.
23	10	"By the Light of Dawn"	Joshua Butler	Todd Slavkin & Darren Swimmer	March 6, 2017	267314-23	0.64
Madzie infiltrates the Institute on Valentine's behalf, killing many Shadowhunters but sparing Alec. Jace, Clary and Luke take Dot to Magnus'. She reveals that Valentine believes that Jace can destroy the Soul Sword. Clary receives a video call from Valentine: he slits Simon's throat to draw her to the Institute. The group head to the Institute, and Clary, who goes to feed Simon to heal him, is revealed to be a glamoured Jace. Jace attempts to destroy the Sword but inadvertently charges it; Valentine activates it as a Downworlder army storms in, killing all of them, including Alaric, Luke's fellow werewolf and police partner. Jace and Valentine battle for the Sword outside and Valentine, compelled by the Sword to tell the truth while holding it, reveals that he is actually not Jace's father. Jace then attempts to kill Valentine, but Clary stops him because he is the only one who knows where the Mortal Cup is. Alec frantically searches for Magnus in the aftermath, and on finding him, the two profess their love for each other. Simon discovers he can now be in the sunlight without being burned. Jace attempts to tell Clary that they are not related, but decides against doing so when he sees her and Simon happily together. Valentine is taken into custody as the Soul Sword disappears and is picked up by a strange figure in black.
Part 2
24	11	"Mea Maxima Culpa"	Matt Hastings	Michael Reisz	June 5, 2017	267314-24	0.71
After Aldertree is sent back to Idris to face reprimand, the Inquisitor Imogen Herondale temporarily takes over the Institute and tortures Valentine for the whereabouts of The Mortal Cup. The Greater Demon Azazel arrives in town also looking for The Cup. The wolves of the New York pack challenge the leadership of their alpha Luke. Isabelle, in the throes of yin fen withdrawal, seeks out Raphael for help, but he refuses to feed on her. She is attacked by Azazel, but is saved by a new Shadowhunter, Sebastian Verlac. Simon talks to Maia about his new ability to survive sunlight. Raphael tells Magnus and Alec about Isabelle coming to him; Alec thinks that Isabelle has been kidnapped by Azazel after finding her broken necklace. Jace and Clary go to Valentine for help finding the Greater Demon, and he reveals they are not related. Clary berates Jace for concealing this secret from her but apologizes afterwards. Luke's new police partner Ollie is suspicious of his actions. Isabelle accompanies Sebastian to his apartment where he gives advice on overcoming yin fen addiction. Upon Alec's request, Magnus summons Azazel, with Valentine as bait. But the demon manages to escape the summoning circle and appears to cast a spell on Magnus and Valentine.
25	12	"You Are Not Your Own"	Bille Woodruff	Jamie Gorenberg	June 12, 2017	267314-25	0.55
Azazel has cast a body-swapping spell on Magnus and Valentine. Isabelle brings Sebastian back to the institute to help catch the still-at-large Azazel; Alec heads to Magnus' loft for help with tracking the demon. When Alec arrives, Azazel attacks him but is vanquished, leaving Valentine and Magnus trapped in one another's bodies. Magnus, in Valentine's body, is locked up in the Institute; he tries to explain the body-swap to Alec, but Alec does not believe him and he is tortured in Valentine's place for information about the Mortal Cup. Simon fights with Raphael over revealing how he became a daylighter. Imogen prepares to execute Valentine against Clave orders, but Valentine, masquerading as Magnus, has kidnapped Jace and sends a visual message to the cells revealing that Jace's biological family are the Herondales; he demands his body be sent to him at Magnus' loft. The demands are met, and the body-swapping spell is undone. At the last second, Clary pushes Valentine, now back in his own body, through a portal back to the cells at the Institute. Alec tries to comfort Magnus in the aftermath.
26	13	"Those of Demon Blood"	Michael Goi	Zac Hug	June 19, 2017	267314-26	0.59
Several Shadowhunters are killed and their runes cut-off. Imogen Herondale appoints Jace as the head of the New York Institute. Alec goes to Magnus loft to get a DNA sample to prove he isn't involved in the killings; the two fight and Magnus demands he leave. Imogen suggests micro-chipping all Downworlders to be constantly aware of their whereabouts, Alec vehemently disagrees, but Jace seems amenable to the idea. Max arrives and Isabelle is appointed his tutor. Clary is attacked and injured but Simon rescues her and takes her to the Institute. Jace heads to the Hunter's Moon to begin chipping werewolves and he and Maia get into a physical fight which results in her being chipped. Luke, angered at the Shadowhunters' behaviour, tells Jace to leave. An upset and tipsy Magnus spends some time with Dot. Isabelle meets Raphael for help finding the killer, Max follows her and is kidnapped. With Meliorn's help, they find Max and kill the culprit, a Seelie named Kaelie seeking justice for her brother, who was among the casualties during Valentine's attack at the Institute. Jace appoints Alec head of the Institute. Alec apologises to Magnus, and the two reconcile. Jace, on Alec's orders, de-chips Maia, and the two sleep together.
27	14	"The Fair Folk"	Chris Grismer	Taylor Mallory	June 26, 2017	267314-27	0.67
Alec sends Clary and Jace on a mission to the Seelie Court; Simon insists on joining them. At the Institute, Alec begins the Downworlder Cabinet, a weekly meeting with representatives from the warlocks, vampires, Seelies, and werewolves. Alec discusses the Institute's new policy of complete transparency with Magnus, Luke, Meliorn and Raphael. Maryse is back in town; she and Isabelle discuss her father's infidelity and Isabelle's yin fen addiction. They reconcile. At the Seelie Court, the Seelie Queen drives a wedge between Simon and the Shadowhunters by revealing Clary still harbors feelings for Jace. An unknown individual with a plot to execute Valentine contacts Luke. Luke heads down to the Institute cells to kill Valentine, but is foiled by Sebastian and Alec. Despite being angry at Luke's recklessness, Alec decides not to press charges. Isabelle asks Raphael to pursue a relationship with her and he refuses, having followed Sebastian's advice to stay away from her. Sebastian plays piano next to several burner phones on a chair, revealing he was the culprit who deceived Luke. Hearing a noise from a closet, he threatens a bound man he has kept inside.
28	15	"A Problem of Memory"	Peter DeLuise	Allison Rymer	July 10, 2017	267314-28	0.46
Alec is worried about Magnus' wellbeing, he questions Magnus, but is assured by the warlock nothing is amiss. Simon breaks up with Clary, and Isabelle comforts her. That night Simon is introduced to a Bleeder's Den, where vampires bite mundanes to get high; a girl is found dead the next morning and Simon worries he may be the culprit. Sebastian's cousin, Aline, arrives at the New York Institute; the man captive in Sebastian's apartment is revealed to be the real Sebastian. After being arrested by Luke's police partner Ollie, Simon escapes and returns to the Bleeder's Den where he stakes the real murderer of the dead girl. As a result of the torture he suffered in Valentine's body, Magnus is having flashbacks of the night he found his mother, dead. He finally confesses his struggles to Alec, who consoles him. The real Sebastian escapes and tries to warn Aline, but his captor kills him before he can reach her. The Shadowhunters portal Valentine to Idris, but are circumvented with Valentine ending up at an abandoned cabin with Sebastian. Sebastian's true form is revealed and he calls Valentine "father".
29	16	"Day of Atonement"	Paul Wesley	Peter Binswanger	July 17, 2017	267314-29	0.59
Jonathan holds Valentine captive; he intends to send him to Edom as punishment for Valentine doing the same to him. Jace suspects Valentine is hiding in a cabin in Idris where he spent time during his childhood. Clary draws a portal rune and the two are transported to Lake Lyn in Idris. Jace and Clary lose track of each other and Clary hallucinates the Angel Ithuriel who tells her that Jonathan is alive. Alec senses Jace is in trouble through their parabatai bond and with the help of his father Robert, sends Isabelle to find him. Isabelle finds Jace and together they retrieve Clary and cure her of the hallucinogenic effects of the waters of Lake Lyn. The three look for the cabin only to find it deserted. Robert reveals to Alec that the Clave never recovered the Soul Sword and has been lying to the Downworld. Valentine convinces the resentful Jonathan to work with him. With information they found at the cabin, Clary realizes that her real brother Jonathan is still alive.
30	17	"A Dark Reflection"	Jeffrey Hunt	Hollie Overton	July 24, 2017	267314-30	0.60
Jonathan is revealed to be in possession of the Soul Sword, thus with two of the three Mortal Instruments, he and Valentine hunt for the Mortal Mirror. Luke receives a message from Cleophas, still Valentine's captive, that the Clave lied about possessing the Soul Sword; he shares the information with Magnus. Magnus confronts Alec with the news and is furious that it was kept from him. No longer able to trust the Clave, he debates aligning with the Seelie Queen. Isabelle struggles with the fact that Max is growing up and convinces Maia to give a relationship with Simon a chance. Jonathan is torn about his loyalty to Valentine, as it pits him against his sister, Clary. Jace and Clary find out that her mother had hidden The Mortal Mirror. With the help of Dot, they recover it before being attacked by Jonathan. Dot stays behind to give them a chance to escape. Max uses a hair he found to track Jonathan to Sebastian. He challenges Sebastian with this knowledge.
31	18	"Awake, Arise, or Be Forever Fallen"	Amanda Row	Jamie Gorenberg	July 31, 2017	267314-31	0.63
Max lies in a coma following Jonathan's attack and the Institute is put on lockdown when it becomes clear Jonathan is inside. Magnus and Luke meet with the Seelie Queen, who proposes a Downworlder alliance against Valentine, even if it means starting a war with the Shadowhunters. Luke refuses immediately while Magnus is given time to decide. Jonathan steals the Mortal Mirror. Magnus chooses to serve his people over his relationship with Alec and breaks up with him. Clary discovers Sebastian is Jonathan when he fails a test and manages to get the Mirror back before he escapes the Institute. However, her attempt to disarm the Mirror destroys it, and she realizes the real Mirror is Lake Lyn.
32	19	"Hail and Farewell"	Matt Hastings	Bryan Q. Miller	August 7, 2017	267314-32	0.60
Isabelle, Jace, and Clary are trying to take out Valentine and Jonathan but get attacked by a demon possessing the real Sebastian. Jace kills the demon. Clary tells the Inquisitor that the Mortal Mirror is Lake Lyn in Idris. The Seelie Queen comes to the institute to meet with the Downworld Council but she refuses to give her support to capture and execute Valentine. Maia and Simon are dating. Clary finds out where Jonathan and Valentine are located and goes after them. Jonathan realizes that they were tracked and so Valentine creates forsaken soldiers to protect him and then leaves to Idris. Clary, Jace, Alec, and Izzy arrive at the church and split up to cover more ground. The forsaken attack both teams and Jonathan takes Jace. But Jace goads him and they both face off against each other and Jace stabs Jonathan and pushes him into the river. Maia is abducted.
33	20	"Beside Still Water"	Matt Hastings	Todd Slavkin & Darren Swimmer	August 14, 2017	267314-33	0.59
The dying Jonathan has washed ashore on the shore of Manhattan and using his blood, he summons the wraith demons. Luke and Simon come to Magnus after Maia's abduction. Clary and Jace are captured by the Consul of the Clave, Malachi Dieudonné who is revealed to have been in league with Valentine all along. He and some Circle members attempt to execute them, but Clary and Jace kill them. And in the final battle, Valentine eventually succeeds in summoning Raziel and kills Jace. Clary, in a fit of rage, attacks and stabs Valentine, finally killing him. With Raziel's summoning, Clary wishes for Jace's resurrection, but there are unforeseen consequences. At the end, a party is held at the Hunter's Moon to celebrate Valentine's death, Magnus and Alec get back together, Ollie confronts Luke after realizing that he is a werewolf, Simon goes back to the Seelie realm after secretly making a deal with the Queen in exchange for Maia's freedom, Jace feels with great pain the consequences of his resurrection, and the demons coalesce into a mysterious woman who sees Jonathan's dead body and calls him "son".

=== Season 3 (2018–19) ===
No. overall	No. in season	Title	Directed by	Written by	Original release date	Prod. code	US viewers (millions)
Part 1
34	1	"On Infernal Ground"	Matt Hastings	Todd Slavkin & Darren Swimmer	March 20, 2018	267314-34	0.49
Clary becomes a fully fledged Shadowhunter but she and Jace are concealing the truth over what happened at Lake Lyn. An owl faced demon starts preying on mundanes. Lilith plans to resurrect the deceased Jonathan and get her revenge on Jace for killing him. Luke repeatedly dismisses Ollie's concerns of him being a werewolf until he admits the truth after a demon attack. Magnus deals with the fall out of his decision to side with the Seelie Queen, who has a mysterious mark forcefully placed on Simon.
35	2	"The Powers That Be"	Peter DeLuise	Peter Binswanger	March 27, 2018	267314-35	0.44
Jace asks Clary out on their first proper date but it ends up being an awkward double date when they encounter Simon and Maia. Whilst attending a party, Magnus realises the ley lines have been corrupted, he and Alec work together to try and fix it. Having grown less than satisfied with his and Maia's romance, the werewolves threaten Simon into peacefully leaving their territory. When he refuses to comply, Glenn tries to attack him, just as Simon's forehead glows and unintentionally blasts the werewolf away.
36	3	"What Lies Beneath"	Amanda Row	Alex Schemmer	April 3, 2018	267314-36	0.46
Alec hosts a dinner with his mother at Magnus' in which she reveals bad news: Due to the reveal that Malachi, the former Consul, was a traitor, the Clave reopened cases to investigate former Circle members and has declared her a traitor for her previous allegiance with Valentine and she will be stripped of her runes; which upsets him. Jace suspects that Jonathan is the Owl and behind the mundane attacks. Raphael faces an extremely upsetting personal loss. A newly resurrected Heidi, the girl who was killed in one of the bleeder dens, is eager to meet her sire Simon, though Raphael insists she needs time to adjust. However, by the time Raphael returns, Heidi has managed to escape. Simon tries desperately to enter the Seelie Realm and ask about the mysterious mark they gave him. He turns to Raphael, but is rejected, calling him out for refusing to share how he became a Daylighter, then Simon's mark is triggered, knocking Raphael aside. The Owl turns out to be Jace.
37	4	"Thy Soul Instructed"	Emile Levisetti	Jamie Gorenberg	April 10, 2018	267314-37	0.35
Jace's friends and family begin to notice some changes within his personality. Jace turns to Luke for information about his family's past. Lilith realizes that she can only control Jace while asleep, due to his love for Clary being stronger than the Owl's love for Lilith, who goes to Magnus seeking an anti-love potion. Simon happens to bump into the ideal roommate, who might have ulterior motives for befriending Simon. Clary and Izzy pursue Heidi, a vampire that is out of control. After a failed attempt to kill Heidi, she ties Raphael up on the rooftop while recalling how she wanted to become a vampire herself before leaving him to die as the sun starts to rise. Clary and Izzy release him. Raphael's plans to become a Daylighter are discovered by a heartbroken Isabelle, who as a result, orders him to abandon the city and never return.
38	5	"Stronger Than Heaven"	Geoff Shotz	Brian Millikin	April 17, 2018	267314-38	0.30
Alec learns more about Magnus' romantic past after asking to move in. To try and deal with the Owl, Clary seeks out Cleophas to see if she has any way to contact the angels. She manages to contact Ithuriel but he is killed by Lilith before he could say anything important and takes a sliver of Clary's soul to fulfill the potion's completion. Jace is suspicious of Simon's well-timed new roommate and it is revealed he is a werewolf who was tasked with looking after Simon, who becomes angered at first, realizing that Kyle called off his gig, but eventually relents. Lilith takes full control of Jace as the Owl after he unknowingly drinks the anti-love potion given by Magnus.
39	6	"A Window Into an Empty Room"	Alexis Ostrander	Aisha Porter-Christie	April 24, 2018	267314-39	0.43
Magnus and Alec have a fight about their varying experiences which is left unresolved. Magnus and Clary team up to investigate the demon and a face from Magnus' past appears to help them. Simon tries to make amends with Heidi, who won't seem to leave him alone. She attacks Isabelle, mistaking her for Simon's girlfriend, out of jealousy. Simon handles the situation by turning Heidi in to the Praetor Lupus. The Lightwoods go out for a meal at the Hunter's Moon and Luke reaches out to Maryse. While investigating the demon, Clary and Magnus find the Owl demon trying to possess Ollie, and Luke comes along and assists. The Owl's identity is revealed, but he possesses Ollie, who runs off, before clambering up a building.
40	7	"Salt in the Wound"	Joshua Butler	Celeste Vasquez	May 1, 2018	267314-40	0.42
After a fight with a possessed Jace, Clary tells Alec and the team about resurrecting him. Magnus beats himself up about unknowingly helping Lilith. Sam, Ollie's girlfriend, becomes concerned about her sudden disappearance and confronts Luke about it. Kyle is revealed as Jordan, Maia's ex who turned her, and both reminisce about their past. Looking for clues at Lilith's lair with Luke, Simon's mark disintegrates two of Lilith's disciples into salt. Clary, Alec and Izzy get the Malachi Configuration with Imogen's help, but Jace kills her and uses her thumb to gain access to the Cemetery of the Disgraced and obtain a rib from Valentine's corpse for Jonathan's rebirth. Clary is arrested by the Clave as she portals Alec, Izzy and the imprisoned Jace to Magnus' place.
41	8	"A Walk in Darkness"	Ari Sandel	Jamie Gorenberg	May 8, 2018	267314-41	0.42
In New York, Simon, Maia and Jordan manage to find Lilith's base in the city. Maia leaves the city temporarily to rethink her life after Jordan tells her how he feels. Frightened about Simon's mark of Cain, Lilith threatens the Seelie Queen into removing it. She defiantly refuses and makes a negotiation instead, telling her where Jace is. Magnus uses his magic to send Alec and Isabelle into Jace's mind, hoping to break Lilith's control over him. When he is found, Jace begs his siblings to kill him, but Alec promises to keep him safe. However, Lilith arrives and takes Jace. Clary is sentenced to death after the Clave's knowledge of her wish to Raziel.
42	9	"Familia Ante Omnia"	Matt Hastings	Taylor Mallory	May 15, 2018	267314-42	0.37
The Clave wants to interrogate Valentine about Lilith. Clary stalls her impending execution by resurrecting him. Alec and Magnus turn to the new High Warlock of Brooklyn, Lorenzo Rey, for permission to save Jace, but he refuses, then Magnus himself argues with Lorenzo, escalating into a fight, so he has no choice but to turn to his father Asmodeus for help. Heidi, whom Jace kidnapped after killing two of the Praetors in charge of her, is encouraged by Lilith to turn on Simon, and she forces him to drink his sister's blood in front of his mother who fearfully kicks Simon out and threatens to kill him should he ever return. Isabelle comforts the devastated Simon and sends for a blood transfusion to keep his sister from turning. Clary deactivates the resurrection rune on Valentine, rendering him dead again; Jace takes one of Valentine's ribs for Lilith and brings Clary with him.
43	10	"Erchomai"	Jeffrey Hunt	Bryan Q. Miller	May 15, 2018	267314-43	0.31
After some support from his sister, Simon hypnotizes his mother into believing he is dead to prevent her from telling anyone about his vampirism and being thought of as crazy. Alec is stabbed by a possessed Jace; Magnus exchanges his magic with Asmodeus to remove Lilith's control and the Owl's essence from Jace. Clary is brought to Lilith and receives a rune that connects her life force to Jonathan's. Goading her into attacking him, Simon's Mark of Cain sends Lilith back to Edom, causing an explosion and releasing all of the possessed mundanes and Ollie from Lilith's control, though not before Jonathan rises from the dead. Simon believes he has killed Clary as she cannot be found in the aftermath, leaving him and Jace saddened.
Part 2: Shadowhunters: The Final Hunt
44	11	"Lost Souls"	Matt Hastings	Todd Slavkin & Darren Swimmer	February 25, 2019	267314-44	0.37
Jace, Alec and Isabelle go after an escaped Seelie prisoner from the Gard who goes down into a sewer system. Once there, Jace attacks the prisoner until Alec stops him and Isabelle arrests the prisoner. Jace angrily reminds them that Clary's death was on him after being chastised by his siblings for risking his life. Clary and Jonathan are revealed to have survived the explosion, with Lilith transporting the apartment to Siberia seconds before her banishment. Simon, still guilt-ridden for causing Clary's supposed death and afraid of hurting anyone, is desperate to get rid of the Mark of Cain and Maia tries to help him. Luke convinces Jace that Clary might be still alive. Iris, who was previously broken out of the Gard during Valentine's murderous rampage, tries to get Madzie back, but is foiled and recaptured by the Clave. Isabelle suspects that the Clave is torturing the imprisoned Downworlders. Clary attempts to kill Jonathan to prevent him from wreaking havoc on Earth, but then realizes that because of the mark Lilith carved into her skin, their lives are now bound together as one.
45	12	"Original Sin"	Matt Hastings	Alex Schemmer	March 4, 2019	267314-45	0.31
Jonathan transports the apartment to Paris where he still tries to get Clary on his side and she pretends to give him a chance. Clary steals a stele from a French shadowhunter to call for help, but he stops her and Jonathan kills him. Simon goes with Isabelle to seek Cain, the oldest vampire in New York, for help in removing the Mark of Cain from his forehead. The mark is finally removed, though to be healed, Simon feeds on Isabelle after his blood evaporates. With Alec's help, Magnus tries to get used to his new life as a mortal without his powers. Jace, Alec, Luke and Magnus realize that Clary is still alive and the three of them (excluding Magnus) arrive at Paris to find her. Clary stabs herself in the leg, forcing Jonathan to flee. He returns to Lilith's apartment, where he screams in anguish.
46	13	"Beati Bellicosi"	Michael Rohl	Brian Millikin	March 11, 2019	267314-46	0.35
Jace and Clary explore ways to remove the mark drawn by Lilith but find no means of removing it. Jonathan uses the mark to force Clary to harm herself. Isabelle, still feeling the after effects of Simon's venom, goes to Magnus for help, but he is unable to assist now that his magic is gone. She tells Alec, who promises to always be there for her. Heidi plays the vampires and werewolves off against each other. As Jordan and the pack close in, she kills one of them, before telling the leader of the New York vampire clan the wolves are after her, neglecting to mention the true reasons why. When the wolves storm the hotel to look for her, she coerces the vampires into retaliation, leading to a huge fight at the Jade Wolf. Maia and Simon break up after Luke tells Maia she needs to become the pack alpha to help protect the wolves. Luke and Maryse grow close as they work together to help find the sword Clary needs to capture Jonathan. The fight at the Jade Wolf sees Russell, the current pack alpha, killed, leaving Maia and a wounded Jordan trapped in the kitchen as the vampires close in.
47	14	"A Kiss from a Rose"	Salli Richardson-Whitfield	Zoe Broad	March 18, 2019	267314-47	0.31
Maia and Jordan are still trapped in the Jade Wolf's kitchen after the vampire attack led by Heidi. Maia forgives Jordan for turning her. Luke and Simon arrive to rescue Maia and Jordan, but when a police car arrives, Luke stays behind and surrenders himself. Clary and Jace have a romantic date skating on ice. However, the date is cut short when Jonathan, who is now on New York, knocks Jace unconscious and shifts into him. Magnus asks Lorenzo to help him get his magic back. He agrees, but warns Magnus that there are risks, something that starts to show when Magnus's nose starts to bleed. Clary calls Isabelle for help in capturing Jonathan. When she arrives with Jace and some shadowhunters, Clary attacks Jonathan and pins him to the ground, but due to both the reluctance she has of their bond and something that is holding her back, Clary unwittingly lets him go. The encounter gives Jonathan hope that Clary will eventually join him.
48	15	"To the Night Children"	Siluck Saysanasy	Peter Binswanger	March 25, 2019	267314-48	0.35
Heidi celebrates with the vampires. The leader of the clan informs Heidi that Maia and Jordan survived. Heidi feigns innocence on the vampire attack to escape imprisonment and lets the other vampires take the fall. Now that Lorenzo lives in Magnus's apartment, his only condition to give him the magic, Alec lets Magnus stay at the Institute where he is not well received. Lilith's rune begins to rule Clary's life; she senselessly punches Aline, who wishes for nothing more than avenging her cousin Sebastian, when she repeatedly provokes her about allowing Jonathan to escape until Jace intervenes and convinces Aline not to report Clary to the Clave. She goes outside and unexpectedly runs into Jonathan, who dares her to call the Clave on him, yet she does it too late as Jonathan escapes. A vengeful Maia kills Heidi by tricking her into feeding on her, having injected herself with holy water, much to Simon's anger. Isabelle decides to turn Raphael in to the Clave after Alec finds out that she let him go, even though he had experimented on Heidi, and they share an emotional goodbye. Magnus collapses to the ground coughing up blood.
49	16	"Stay With Me"	Amanda Row	Aisha Porter-Christie	April 1, 2019	267314-49	0.37
Magnus' body is rejecting Lorenzo's magic; consequently, Alec convinces Lorenzo to retrieve his magic from Magnus; he does, but Lorenzo makes it clear that he still owns the apartment. After the rune causes Clary to lash out at Simon, she desperately begs Jace that they turn to Lilith in order to know how to remove it. Jonathan attempts to kill Lilith in order to obtain the Morning Star sword from the Seelie Queen; Clary coincidentally saves her and learns she can remove her twinning rune through a weapon made from heavenly fire. Jonathan follows shortly afterwards, injuring Jace and Isabelle, but Simon saves her, Jace uses his healing rune, and Clary sends Jonathan to a cell in the Institute. Alec reassures Magnus that he will love him the same without magic, and asks his mother for the family ring to propose to Magnus.
50	17	"Heavenly Fire"	Shannon Kohli	Celeste Vasquez	April 8, 2019	267314-50	0.31
Clary questions Jonathan about the Morning Star sword; recalling a recurring nightmare she had as a child, Clary blames herself for not playing a part in trying to help him, but Jace reassures her that despite how much Lilith abused Jonathan, it was still too late for Clary to help. Isabelle sends Simon on a mission as an undercover prisoner to find out more about the Heavenly Fire project. He encounters Raphael and Iris. Aided by Aline, Isabelle learns that Victor Aldertree is behind the project, planning to slip a serum made with Heavenly Fire into the water supply to cleanse the world of Downworlders. Raphael is injected and becomes human, much to his delight. Helen Blackthorn, a half-Seelie Shadowhunter, regrets being involved in the project and helps Simon get some vials for Clary which could remove the rune that binds her to Jonathan; Iris sacrifices herself to ensure their escape. Aldertree is arrested under Jia's orders. Alec arranges a beautiful dinner for Magnus where he intends to propose to him but opts not to in the face of Magnus' grief over the loss of his magic and immortality.
51	18	"The Beast Within"	Joshua Butler	Taylor Mallory	April 15, 2019	267314-51	0.34
Isabelle tries to remove Clary and Jonathan's twinning rune with the heavenly fire serum but it doesn't work. A demon outbreak in New York City during Halloween terrorizes the mundanes. Alec speaks with Asmodeus through a warlock conduit, demanding that he give Magnus his magic and immortality back, but Alec will have to break up with Magnus to fulfill the deal. Becky, who has come all the way from Florida to New York to visit and spend time with him, deduces that Simon is in love with Isabelle and encourages him to tell her how he feels. Lanaia, a loyal follower to the Seelie Queen, is ordered to kill Jonathan and breaks into the Institute looking for him. Coincidentally, Clary succumbs to Lilith's rune, hits Jace in the head and decapitates Lanaia before breaking Jonathan out of his cell. Asmodeus escapes Edom and goes to search for Magnus.
52	19	"Aku Cinta Kamu"	Siluck Saysanasy	Jamie Gorenberg	April 22, 2019	267314-52	0.32
Jace goes undercover by joining Clary and Jonathan on their quest to get the Morning Star sword after the Clave reinstates the kill order on both of them. Clary lets him tag along, though Jonathan remains suspicious of his motives. They go to a night club frequented by Downworlders and the Seelie Queen herself. However, Clary and Jonathan discover Jace's deception when a Seelie ring he used to contact Alec through telepathy is revealed after Jonathan coerced him into ingesting a drug. Clary threatens retaliation if Jace interferes again and portals him back to the Institute. Isabelle starts working on a more potent formula for the heavenly fire. Raphael tells Maia and Jordan about the heavenly fire serum which made him human. Following an argument with Isabelle and Simon over who gets to use the remaining vial, Jordan secretly steals it for himself. Magnus deals with the aftermath of the end of his relationship with Alec and gets a surprising visit from his father Asmodeus, who gives Magnus his magic back and talks him out of erasing his memories of Alec. Magnus then collapses into his father's arms, crying.
53	20	"City of Glass"	Matt Hastings	Bryan Q. Miller	April 29, 2019	267314-53	0.33
Jonathan gets the Morning Star sword in exchange for the Seelie Queen's release, Clary's twinning rune is removed by Jace with Glorious, releasing her from its influence but also causing Jonathan to grow wings and become more powerful than ever before. Asmodeus helps Magnus reclaim his apartment now owned by Lorenzo, turning the High Warlock into a lizard. Through Maryse, he finds out about Alec's plan to marry him and sends Asmodeus to eternal limbo. Jordan wants Maia to take the last vial of heavenly fire to become human, but she refuses and returns it to Luke, who was instructed by the Praetor Lupus to retrieve it. Later that night, Jordan dies from a silver poisoning injury (which was from the Jade Wolf vampire attack) that the Praetor Lupus could not heal, and Maia becomes the new leader of the pack. A rift is opened in Alicante and Jonathan destroys the Morning Star sword before flying away. Magnus gets engaged with Alec then goes to Edom to close the rift, preventing any other demons from escaping.
54	21	"Alliance"	Todd Slavkin	Story by : Bryan Q. Miller; Teleplay by : Jamie Gorenberg & Peter Binswanger	May 6, 2019	267314-54	0.31
The Seelie Queen offers Jonathan protection in her court. Alec becomes desperate to save Magnus from Edom. A displeased Magnus is visited by Lilith, who wants Magnus to reopen the rift so that she can kill Jonathan for trying to do the same to her, but he refuses and dismisses her. Luke injects himself with the remaining heavenly fire serum, reverting to a Shadowhunter. Advised by Maia, Simon comes clean about his feelings for Isabelle and they kiss, when suddenly Isabelle is engulfed in flames. Helen examines her and has bad news: Isabelle's body has been infused with heavenly fire and her body will become unstable everytime she gets close to something with demon blood, especially Downworlders. After creating a rune that binds Shadowhunters and Downworlders, Clary, Jace, Simon and Alec, accompanied by Meliorn and a redeemed Lorenzo, travel to Edom to save both Magnus and Isabelle, who has entered the demonic realm without their knowledge.
55	22	"All Good Things..."	Todd Slavkin	Todd Slavkin & Darren Swimmer	May 6, 2019	267314-55	0.31
Jace and Isabelle confront Lilith. Magnus and Lorenzo are unable to defeat her with their magic, so Isabelle intervenes and disintegrates Lilith with the heavenly fire, which destroys Edom as well. Magnus is more than eager to marry Alec and refuses to wait any longer. Jonathan kills the Seelie Queen and begins his reign of terror by targeting institutes around the world. Clary is visited by her deceased mother who warns her not to create another rune or else she will be stripped of her powers as punishment for taking advantage of her gifts. Jonathan attacks the Los Angeles Institute, killing everyone inside, but sparing Robert and Max. Clary decides to go on her own and stop him. After managing to distract him long enough, she draws a rune that finally kills her evil brother for good. Clary's runes slowly begin to disappear, having once again defied the angels' orders. Alec and Magnus get married. Aline and Helen pursue their own relationship. Clary leaves the Institute as all of her runes disappear, losing her powers and memories, though not before she leaves Jace a letter about her predicament. One year later, Alec is now the Inquisitor of the Clave after Imogen's death, Isabelle takes over her brother's role as head of the Institute and Magnus becomes the High Warlock of Alicante. Maia buys and runs the Jade Wolf, which will be frequented by Downworlders and Simon completes his graphic novel that he was working on, as well as becoming a Clave Downworlder Deputy. As for Jace, he has been unable to move on from Clary, despite Simon insisting that he should move on and leave her alone. Clary returns to becoming an artist and is exhibiting her paintings. Under his glamour, Jace watches her and she begins to recognize him, hinting that the angels might have forgiven Clary for her past actions.

== Ratings ==
Shadowhunters : U.S. viewers per episode (millions)
Audience measurement performed by Nielsen Media Research

=== Season 1 ===
Viewership and ratings per episode of List of Shadowhunters episodes
No.	Title	Air date	Rating (18–49)	Viewers (millions)	DVR (18–49)	DVR viewers (millions)	Total (18–49)	Total viewers (millions)
1	"The Mortal Cup"	January 12, 2016	0.8	1.82	0.4	0.88	1.2	2.70
2	"The Descent Into Hell Isn't Easy"	January 19, 2016	0.4	1.01	0.3	0.75	0.7	1.76
3	"Dead Man's Party"	January 26, 2016	0.5	0.98	—N/a	—N/a	—N/a	—N/a
4	"Raising Hell"	February 2, 2016	0.4	0.96	0.4	0.93	0.8	1.89
5	"Moo Shu to Go"	February 9, 2016	0.4	0.95	0.4	0.75	0.8	1.70
6	"Of Men and Angels"	February 16, 2016	0.4	0.98	0.4	—N/a	0.8	—N/a
7	"Major Arcana"	February 23, 2016	0.4	0.84	0.3	0.72	0.7	1.56
8	"Bad Blood"	March 1, 2016	0.4	0.87	0.3	0.74	0.7	1.61
9	"Rise Up"	March 8, 2016	0.4	0.95	0.3	0.77	0.7	1.72
10	"This World Inverted"	March 15, 2016	0.3	0.78	0.4	0.74	0.7	1.52
11	"Blood Calls to Blood"	March 22, 2016	0.3	0.78	0.3	—N/a	0.6	—N/a
12	"Malec"	March 29, 2016	0.3	0.82	0.3	—N/a	0.6	—N/a
13	"Morning Star"	April 5, 2016	0.3	0.76	0.3	—N/a	0.6	—N/a

=== Season 2 ===
Viewership and ratings per episode of List of Shadowhunters episodes
No.	Title	Air date	Rating (18–49)	Viewers (millions)	DVR (18–49)	DVR viewers (millions)	Total (18–49)	Total viewers (millions)
1	"This Guilty Blood"	January 2, 2017	0.4	1.19	—N/a	—N/a	—N/a	—N/a
2	"A Door Into the Dark"	January 9, 2017	0.3	0.75	—N/a	—N/a	—N/a	—N/a
3	"Parabatai Lost"	January 16, 2017	0.3	0.81	—N/a	—N/a	—N/a	—N/a
4	"Day of Wrath"	January 23, 2017	0.3	0.64	—N/a	0.55	—N/a	1.19
5	"Dust and Shadows"	January 30, 2017	0.2	0.58	0.3	—N/a	0.5	—N/a
6	"Iron Sisters"	February 6, 2017	0.3	0.65	—N/a	—N/a	—N/a	—N/a
7	"How Are Thou Fallen"	February 13, 2017	0.2	0.55	—N/a	—N/a	—N/a	—N/a
8	"Love is the Devil"	February 20, 2017	0.3	0.67	—N/a	—N/a	—N/a	—N/a
9	"Bound by Blood"	February 27, 2017	0.2	0.52	—N/a	—N/a	—N/a	—N/a
10	"By the Light of Dawn"	March 6, 2017	0.3	0.64	—N/a	—N/a	—N/a	—N/a
11	"Mea Maxima Culpa"	June 5, 2017	0.3	0.71	—N/a	—N/a	—N/a	—N/a
12	"You Are Not Your Own"	June 12, 2017	0.2	0.55	0.2	0.44	0.4	0.99
13	"Those of Demon Blood"	June 19, 2017	0.2	0.59	0.2	—N/a	0.4	—N/a
14	"The Fair Folk"	June 26, 2017	0.3	0.67	—N/a	—N/a	—N/a	—N/a
15	"A Problem of Memory"	July 10, 2017	0.2	0.46	0.2	0.47	0.4	0.92
16	"Day of Atonement"	July 17, 2017	0.2	0.59	0.2	—N/a	0.4	—N/a
17	"A Dark Reflection"	July 24, 2017	0.2	0.60	—N/a	—N/a	—N/a	—N/a
18	"Awake, Arise, or Be Forever Fallen"	July 31, 2017	0.3	0.63	—N/a	—N/a	—N/a	—N/a
19	"Hail and Farewell"	August 7, 2017	0.2	0.60	—N/a	—N/a	—N/a	—N/a
20	"Beside Still Water"	August 14, 2017	0.2	0.59	—N/a	0.52	—N/a	1.11

=== Season 3 ===
Viewership and ratings per episode of List of Shadowhunters episodes
No.	Title	Air date	Rating (18–49)	Viewers (millions)	DVR (18–49)	DVR viewers (millions)	Total (18–49)	Total viewers (millions)
1	"On Infernal Ground"	March 20, 2018	0.2	0.49	—N/a	0.51	—N/a	1.01
2	"The Powers That Be"	March 27, 2018	0.2	0.44	—N/a	0.43	—N/a	0.88
3	"What Lies Beneath"	April 3, 2018	0.2	0.46	0.2	—N/a	0.4	—N/a
4	"Thy Soul Instructed"	April 10, 2018	0.1	0.35	0.2	0.46	0.3	0.81
5	"Stronger Than Heaven"	April 17, 2018	0.1	0.30	—N/a	—N/a	—N/a	—N/a
6	"A Window Into an Empty Room"	April 24, 2018	0.2	0.43	—N/a	—N/a	—N/a	—N/a
7	"Salt in the Wound"	May 1, 2018	0.2	0.42	—N/a	—N/a	—N/a	—N/a
8	"A Heart of Darkness"	May 8, 2018	0.2	0.42	0.2	0.41	0.4	0.83
9	"Familia Onte Omnia"	May 15, 2018	0.1	0.37	—N/a	—N/a	—N/a	—N/a
10	"Erchomai"	May 15, 2018	0.1	0.31	—N/a	—N/a	—N/a	—N/a
11	"Lost Souls"	February 25, 2019	0.1	0.37	0.2	0.44	0.3	0.81
12	"Original Sin"	March 4, 2019	0.1	0.31	—N/a	0.31	—N/a	0.62
13	"Beati Bellicosi"	March 11, 2019	0.1	0.35	—N/a	0.39	—N/a	0.73
14	"A Kiss from a Rose"	March 18, 2019	0.1	0.31	0.2	0.38	0.3	0.69
15	"To the Night Children"	March 25, 2019	0.1	0.35	0.2	0.37	0.3	0.72
16	"Stay With Me"	April 1, 2019	0.1	0.37	0.2	0.33	0.3	0.70 (Note: Live +7 ratings were not available, so Live +3 ratings have been used instead.)
17	"Heavenly Fire"	April 8, 2019	0.1	0.31	0.04	0.14	0.1	0.44
18	"The Beast Within"	April 15, 2019	0.1	0.34	0.1	0.19	0.2	0.53
19	"Aku Cinta Kamu"	April 22, 2019	0.1	0.32	—N/a	0.32	—N/a	0.64
20	"City of Glass"	April 29, 2019	0.1	0.33	0.2	0.35	0.3	0.69
21	"Alliance"	May 6, 2019	0.1	0.31	—N/a	0.35	—N/a	0.66
22	"All Good Things..."	May 6, 2019	0.1	0.31	—N/a	0.35	—N/a	0.66
