= Shadowhunters =

2016 American supernatural drama television series

- Title card for the second season
- Genre: Teen drama; Supernatural drama; Horror; Fantasy; Romance
- Based on: The Mortal Instruments by Cassandra Clare
- Developed by: Ed Decter
- Showrunners: Ed Decter; Todd Slavkin; Darren Swimmer
- Starring: Katherine McNamara; Dominic Sherwood; Alberto Rosende; Matthew Daddario; Emeraude Toubia; Isaiah Mustafa; Harry Shum Jr.; Alisha Wainwright
- Opening theme: "This Is the Hunt" by Ruelle
- Composers: Ben Decter (season 1); Trevor Morris; Jack Wall
- Country of origin: United States
- Original language: English
- No. of seasons: 3
- No. of episodes: 55 (list of episodes)

Production
- Executive producers: Ed Decter; Robert Kulzer; Robert Shaye; Michael Lynne; McG; Mary Viola; Michael Reisz; J. Miles Dale; Matt Hastings; Todd Slavkin; Darren Swimmer
- Producers: Don Carmody; David Cormican; Martin Moszkowicz
- Production locations: Toronto, Ontario, Canada
- Camera setup: Single-camera
- Running time: 39–60 minutes
- Production companies: Constantin Film; Wonderland Sound and Vision; Unique Features; Carteret St. Productions

Original release
- Network: Freeform
- Release: January 12, 2016 – May 6, 2019

Shadowhunters, also known as Shadowhunters: The Mortal Instruments, is an American supernatural drama television series developed by Ed Decter, based on the novel series The Mortal Instruments written by Cassandra Clare. It premiered in North America on Freeform on January 12, 2016. Primarily filmed in Toronto, Canada, the series follows Clary Fray (Katherine McNamara), who finds out on her eighteenth birthday that she comes from a long line of Shadowhunters, human-angel hybrids who hunt down devils and demons, and has to deal with the struggle of forbidden love.

Produced by Constantin Film, it serves as a reboot of the 2013 film adaptation of the novels, The Mortal Instruments: City of Bones. The first season of Shadowhunters received mixed responses from critics. The pilot episode attracted the largest audience for Freeform in more than two years. The show received numerous award nominations, winning one GLAAD Award, six Teen Choice Awards and five People's Choice Awards.

In March 2016, the series was renewed for a second season of 20 episodes, which premiered on January 2, 2017. In August 2016, showrunner Ed Decter left the series over "creative differences". Todd Slavkin and Darren Swimmer were named as Decter's replacements. In April 2017, Freeform renewed the show for a third season of 20 episodes, which premiered on March 20, 2018. In June 2018, Freeform canceled the series after three seasons, but ordered two extra episodes to properly conclude the series' story; the second half of the third season premiered on February 25, 2019, with 12 episodes ordered. The two-part series finale aired on May 6, 2019.

== Plot ==
On her 18th birthday, Clary Fray is accepted into the Brooklyn Academy of Arts. That evening, while out celebrating with her best friend, Simon Lewis, Clary sees a group of suspicious people that nobody else can see. She follows them into the back room of the club, witnessing a fight. She interferes, grabbing a blade. Believing she has accidentally committed a murder, Clary is distraught and immediately rushes home. Her mother, Jocelyn Fray, then reveals invisible inkings on her own skin, similar to those worn by the group at the club. Knowing she will be attacked, Jocelyn fears for Clary's safety, asking their friend Dot to send her through a portal to Luke, her only father figure.

However, when she arrives, Clary believes Luke has betrayed her, leading to her returning to her apartment. When she arrives, she finds her mother missing, and a monstrous Dot asking her about a Mortal Cup. Clary is saved by a blond boy from the club, who seems to know more about herself than she does. She joins up with a group of Shadowhunters, half angel half human, to save her mother from the villainous Valentine Morgenstern, Clary's own father, and discovers powers she never knew she possessed. Clary is thrown into the world of demon hunting with the mysterious, narcissistic, and attractive Shadowhunters Jace, Isabelle and Alec and drags her loyal and geeky friend Simon along for the ride. Now living amongst the fair folk, warlocks, vampires, and werewolves, Clary begins a journey of self-discovery as she learns more about her past and what her future may hold.

== Cast and characters ==
=== Main ===
- Katherine McNamara as Clary Fairchild, a Shadowhunter raised among mundanes (humans) who finds out her true heritage on her 18th birthday. She is the daughter of Jocelyn Fairchild and Valentine Morgenstern.
- Dominic Sherwood as Jace Herondale, a charming and narcissistic playboy Shadowhunter who falls in love with Clary and is the adoptive brother of Alec, Isabelle and Max Lightwood
- Alberto Rosende as Simon Lewis, Clary's childhood best friend who gets involved in the Shadow World and later becomes a vampire
- Matthew Daddario as Alec Lightwood, a serious and no-nonsense Shadowhunter, the older brother of Isabelle and Max and the adoptive brother and Parabatai of Jace
- Emeraude Toubia as Isabelle Lightwood, a seductive and charismatic Shadowhunter who is the younger sister of Alec, the older sister of Max and the adoptive sister of Jace
- Isaiah Mustafa as Luke Garroway, a former Shadowhunter turned werewolf and NYPD police officer
- Harry Shum Jr. as Magnus Bane, a very powerful, intelligent and wise warlock who is the former High Warlock of Brooklyn
- Alisha Wainwright as Maia Roberts (season 3; recurring season 2), a mundane turned werewolf, a member of Luke's pack, and the bartender at the Hunter's Moon

=== Recurring ===
==== Introduced in season one ====
- Alan van Sprang as Valentine Morgenstern (seasons 1–2; guest season 3), a rogue Shadowhunter and the leader of the Circle
- Maxim Roy as Jocelyn Fairchild (seasons 1–2; guest season 3), Clary's warm and protective mother and Valentine's ex-wife, who is a former member of the Circle
- Vanessa Matsui as Dorothea Rollins (seasons 1–2), a younger warlock who is Jocelyn's assistant at the shop Jocelyn owns and a sister figure to Clary
- Jon Cor as Hodge Starkweather (season 1; guest season 2), a former Circle member and the weapons trainer at the New York Institute
- David Castro as Raphael Santiago, a catholic vampire who is Camille's former right-hand man and the former leader of the Brooklyn vampire clan
- Jade Hassouné as Meliorn, a Seelie Knight loyal to the Seelie Queen and Isabelle's ex-lover
- Kaitlyn Leeb as Camille Belcourt (season 1; guest season 2), the former leader of the Brooklyn vampire clan and Magnus' ex-girlfriend
- Christina Cox as Elaine Lewis, Simon and Rebecca's widowed mother
- Nicola Correia-Damude as Maryse Lightwood, the former head of the New York Institute and former member of the Circle
- Paulino Nunes as Robert Lightwood (seasons 1–2; guest season 3), a former member of the Circle
- Jack Fulton as Max Lightwood (seasons 1–2; guest season 3), Alec and Isabelle's precocious younger brother and Jace's adoptive brother who is eager to become a Shadowhunter
- Holly Deveaux as Rebecca Lewis (seasons 2–3; guest season 1), Simon's older sister
- Stephanie Bennett as Lydia Branwell (seasons 1–2), a member of the Clave who temporarily takes over the New York Institute
- Raymond Ablack as Raj (seasons 1–2; guest season 3), a Shadowhunter who often enforces the orders of the head of the New York Institute
- Mimi Kuzyk as Imogen Herondale (seasons 2–3; guest season 1), the former Inquisitor of the Clave
- Joel Labelle as Alaric Rodriguez (seasons 1–2), a werewolf who is Luke's NYPD partner
- Jordan Hudyma as Blackwell (season 1)
- Shailene Garnett as Maureen Brown (season 1), Clary and Simon's friend and Simon's bandmate
- Stephen R. Hart as Brother Jeremiah (seasons 1–2), one of the Silent Brothers

==== Introduced in season two ====
- Nick Sagar as Victor Aldertree (season 2; guest season 3), a Clave diplomat who takes over the Institute and leads the manhunt on Jace
- Lisa Berry as Sister Cleophas Garroway (season 2; guest season 3), a former member of the Circle
- Luke Gallo as Rufus (season 2; guest season 3)
- Will Tudor as Sebastian Verlac (season 2) / Jonathan Morgenstern, Clary's older brother and the firstborn son of Jocelyn and Valentine who was injected with demon blood before his birth
- Alexandra Ordolis as Olivia "Ollie" Wilson, a former NYPD officer, Luke's former partner and Sam's girlfriend
- Tara Joshi as Samantha "Sam" (season 2; guest season 3), Ollie's girlfriend
- Lola Flanery and Sarah Hyland (season 2) as the Seelie Queen, the ruler of the Seelie court who takes an interest in Simon's Daylighter status
- Alyssa Capriotti as Lindsay, a nerdy Shadowhunter
- Stephanie Belding as Iris Rouse, a warlock who has the ability to bring people back from the dead
- Ariana Williams as Madzie, Iris's goddaughter who has a close bond with Alec and Magnus
- Noah Danby as Russell, a tough member of Luke's pack
- Joanne Jansen as Gretel (season 2), another member of Luke's pack and Maia's closest friend
- Neven Pajkic as Taito (season 2), a member of Luke's pack and Gretel's godfather
- Shannon Kook as Duncan (season 2), a Shadowhunter who is blackmailed by Jonathan
- Chad Connell as Quinn (season 2), a member of Raphael's clan
- Erica Deutschman as Eloise (season 2), a blonde member of Raphael's clan
- Andreas Apergis as Malachi Dieudonné (season 2), the Consul of the Clave who secretly works for Valentine
- Kevin Alves as Bartholomew "Bat" Velasquez, a mundane whom Russell Turns and becomes a member of the werewolf pack
- Sophia Walker as Catarina Loss (guest season 2; recurring season 3), a warlock who is a close friend of Magnus and becomes Madzie's guardian
- Tessa Mossey as Heidi McKenzie (guest season 2; recurring season 3), a mundane whom Simon meets at a bleeder den who is accidentally drained of blood by Quinn, another vampire
- Josh Horvath as Joshua / ND Vampire, a member of the Brooklyn vampire clan and Raphael's bodyguard

==== Introduced in season three ====
- Anna Hopkins as Lilith, a Greater Demon and the ruler of Edom
- Javier Muñoz as Lorenzo Rey, the current High Warlock of Brooklyn who happens to be jealous of Magnus
- Chai Hansen as Jordan Kyle, a mundane turned werewolf who is Maia's ex-boyfriend and the reason why Maia became a werewolf in the first place
- Genevieve Kang as Morgan Young, a young woman who is briefly possessed by Lilith
- Jonathan Ho as Brother Zachariach, a Silent Brother
- James McGowan as Praetor Scott, a member of the Praetor Lupus who has Luke released from prison after he falsely took credit for his pack's massacre
- Brooks Darnell as Charlie Cooper, a mundane doctor
- Jack J. Yang as Asmodeus, a Greater Demon and Magnus' father
- Steve Byers as Andrew Underhill, an openly gay Shadowhunter who is the Institute's head of security
- Françoise Yip as Jia Penhallow, the current Consul of the Clave following Malachi's death and Aline's mother
- Conrad Coates as Detective Dwyer, the NYPD's lieutenant and Luke's supervisor
- Romaine Waite as Griffin, the new leader of the Brooklyn vampire clan following Raphael's banishment
- Aimee Bessada as Elle, a member of Griffin's vampire clan
- Pasha Ebrahimi as Cain, Abel's brother and the son of Adam and Eve
- Katie Strain as Nora Kendall, a woman who dislikes Heidi
- Luke Baines as Jonathan Morgenstern, the restored form of Clary's brother upon his resurrection. Will Tudor previously played Jonathan in the second season and briefly reprised the role in two episodes of the third season before the role was recast with Baines following the character's resurrection.
- Kimberly-Sue Murray as the adult Seelie Queen
- Kyana Teresa as Lanaia, a Seelie nymph who briefly serves Jonathan before turning on him
- Jacky Lai as Aline Penhallow, Sebastian's cousin and Jia's daughter. Eileen Li previously played Aline through a guest role in the second season before the role was passed to Lai due to scheduling conflicts with the former actress.
- Sydney Meyer as Helen Blackthorn, a Shadowhunter half Seelie who starts dating Aline

== Episodes ==
Season	Episodes		Originally released	
Season	Episodes		First released	Last released
1	13		January 12, 2016	April 5, 2016
2	20	10	January 2, 2017	March 6, 2017
2	20	10	June 5, 2017	August 14, 2017
3	22	10	March 20, 2018	May 15, 2018
3	22	12	February 25, 2019	May 6, 2019

== Production ==
=== Development ===
In 2010, Screen Gems announced that they were going into production on the film adaptation of City of Bones, the first book in The Mortal Instruments series, with hopes of starting a successful film franchise. Production on a film adaptation of the second book, City of Ashes, was due to start in September 2013, but was delayed to 2014, and eventually cancelled, after the first film failed to recoup its budget.

On October 12, 2014, at Mipcom, Constantin confirmed that The Mortal Instruments will return as a television series with Ed Decter as showrunner. Constantin Film and TV head Martin Moszkowicz told The Hollywood Reporter that, "It actually makes sense to do [the novels] as a TV series. There was so much from the book that we had to leave out of the Mortal Instruments film. In the series we'll be able to go deeper and explore this world in greater detail and depth." The producers hope to adapt the entire book series if the TV adaptation proves successful. In February 2015, book series author Cassandra Clare announced via Twitter that the television series would be called Shadowhunters rather than The Mortal Instruments. In March 2015, ABC Family picked up Shadowhunters straight-to-series. The series was renewed for a second season in March 2016, consisting of 20 episodes, which premiered on January 2, 2017. In April 2017, it was announced that the series was renewed for a third season of 20 episodes. The first half of ten episodes premiered on March 20, 2018. On June 4, 2018, Freeform canceled the series after three seasons, but ordered two extra episodes to properly conclude the series' story; the second half of the third season premiered on February 25, 2019.

In August 2016, soon before filming on the second season was to begin, showrunner Ed Decter exited the series over "creative differences". Todd Slavkin and Darren Swimmer, who were former showrunners on Smallville, were announced as Decter's replacements in August 2016.

=== Casting ===
On Twitter, Cassandra Clare announced that she would not be part of casting decisions, and would not be expecting any of the original film cast to return. On April 20, 2015, ABC revealed Dominic Sherwood as the first member of the Shadowhunters cast. On May 1, 2015, it was announced that Emeraude Toubia would be taking the role of Isabelle Lightwood and Alberto Rosende would be joining the cast as Simon Lewis. On May 6, it was reported that Katherine McNamara landed the lead role of Clary Fray. Two days later, on May 8, Matthew Daddario and Isaiah Mustafa were cast as Alec Lightwood and Luke Garroway, respectively. Harry Shum Jr. and Alan van Sprang later joined the cast on May 15, as Magnus Bane and Valentine Morgenstern. On May 18, it was announced that Maxim Roy would be playing Jocelyn Fray.

On May 28, Jon Cor was announced to play Hodge Starkweather, a Shadowhunter and former member of the Circle. David Castro was reported to be portraying vampire Raphael Santiago on June 4. Shortly after, on June 9, Lisa Marcos announced she would be joining the cast as Captain Vargas, a new character created for the series by Ed Decter. On June 12, producer McG's official Twitter account stated that Kaitlyn Leeb had been cast to play the vampire, Camille Belcourt. On June 16, Jade Hassouné was reported to be portraying the faerie, Meliorn. On August 8, Stephanie Bennett was cast as the new character Lydia Branwell, a rule-following Shadowhunter. On September 2, 2016, Alisha Wainwright was announced to play Maia Roberts in the second season, and soon promoted to series regular beginning in the third season.

=== Filming ===
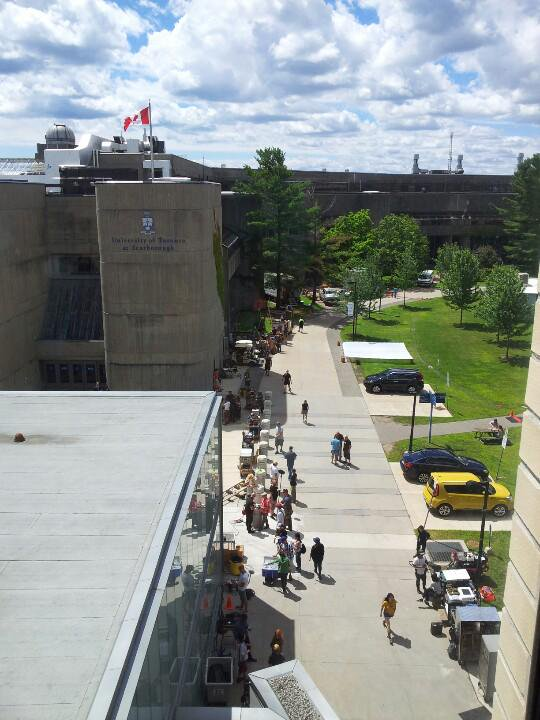
Filming at University of Toronto Scarborough in August 2015

The series began filming in Mississauga, Canada on May 25, 2015. The fictional New York Police Department's 89 Precinct was filmed in the Science Wing at the University of Toronto Scarborough.

== Music ==
=== Soundtrack ===
Shadowhunters (Original Television Series Soundtrack)

Soundtrack album by Various artists
- Released: July 21, 2017
- Recorded: 2016–17
- Genres: Pop, EDM, indie pop, alternative rock
- Length: 18:22

The Mortal Instruments chronology
The Mortal Instruments: City of Bones (2013)	Shadowhunters (Original Television Series Soundtrack) (2017)

Shadowhunters (Original Television Series Soundtrack) was released on platforms including iTunes, Spotify and Apple Music on July 21, 2017, featuring six original songs from the show.

No.	Title	Music	Length
1.	"This Is the Hunt"	Ruelle	3:59
2.	"Fragile World"	Alberto Rosende	2:42
3.	"Murmurs"	Alchemy 3	3:37
4.	"Blood Rose"	birthday	2:49
5.	"The Lifeboat"	Liam O'Donnell	2:18
6.	"Royal Blue"	Alberto Rosende	2:57
Total length:			18:22

Ben Decter composed the instrumental music score for the first season. Trevor Morris and Jack Wall composed the instrumental music score for the second and third seasons. Their music was released as a soundtrack album in 2018. The opening theme song is "This Is The Hunt" performed by Ruelle, which was written for Shadowhunters by Maggie Eckford (Ruelle's real name) and Jeff Bowman. Other Ruelle songs have featured in the series.

== Broadcast ==
The series premiered on January 12, 2016, in the U.S. on Freeform. The second episode, "The Descent into Hell Is Easy", was released online that same day, following the premiere of the first episode. In December 2015, Netflix acquired global rights to Shadowhunters, excluding the U.S., making the series available as an original series a day after the U.S. premiere, with the first episode having launched globally on January 13, 2016, and subsequent episodes having been released on a weekly basis.

== Reception ==
=== Ratings ===
Shadowhunters : U.S. viewers per episode (millions)

Season	Episode number																					
Season	1	2	3	4	5	6	7	8	9	10	11	12	13	14	15	16	17	18	19	20	21	22
1	1.82	1.01	0.98	0.96	0.95	0.98	0.84	0.87	0.95	0.78	0.78	0.82	0.76	–								
2	1.19	0.75	0.81	0.64	0.58	0.65	0.55	0.67	0.52	0.64	0.71	0.55	0.59	0.67	0.46	0.59	0.60	0.63	0.60	0.59	–	
3	0.49	0.44	0.46	0.35	0.30	0.43	0.42	0.42	0.37	0.31	0.37	0.31	0.35	0.31	0.35	0.37	0.31	0.34	0.32	0.33	0.31	0.31

Audience measurement performed by Nielsen Media Research

=== Critical response ===
Critical response of Shadowhunters
Season	Rotten Tomatoes	Metacritic
1	44% (25 reviews)	45 (9 reviews)
2	86% (7 reviews)	—N/a
3	100% (6 reviews)	—N/a

The debut season of Shadowhunters received mixed responses from critics. Metacritic gave it a 45 out of 100 rating, based on 9 reviews, indicating "mixed or average reviews". Rotten Tomatoes gave the first season of the series a 44% rating, based on 25 reviews, with an average rating of 5.81/10. The site's consensus states, "Shadowhunters boasts visual thrills and a potential-rich premise, but they're not enough to overcome the show's self-serious silliness and dull, convoluted plots." However, its latter two seasons subsequently received considerably more favorable reviews.

According to James Poniewozik of The New York Times, the series "has its assets, especially its popular source material. But it might become more fun if it learns to enjoy being the empowerment fantasy it really is."

=== Accolades ===
Year	Award	Category	Nominee(s)	Result	Refs
2016	BMI Film & TV Awards	BMI TV Music Award	Ben Decter	Won	
2016	Joey Awards	Young Actress Age 9 or Younger in a TV Series Drama or Comedy Guest Starring or Principal Role	Sofia Wells	Nominated	
2016	MTV Fandom Awards	Best New Fandom of the Year	Shadowhunters	Won	
2016	MTV Fandom Awards	Ship of the Year	"Malec" (Magnus and Alec)	Nominated	
2016	Teen Choice Awards	Choice TV: Breakout Show	Shadowhunters	Won	
2016	Teen Choice Awards	Choice TV: Breakout Star	Matthew Daddario	Won	
2016	Teen Choice Awards	Choice TV: Breakout Star	Katherine McNamara	Nominated	
2017	Bisexual Representation Award	Best Bisexual Representation by a Supporting Character Male	Harry Shum Jr.	Won	
2017	BMI Film & TV Awards	BMI TV Music Award	Trevor Morris	Won	
2017	GLAAD Awards	Outstanding Drama Series	Shadowhunters	Won	
2017	People's Choice Awards	Favorite Cable Sci-Fi/Fantasy TV Show	Shadowhunters	Nominated	
2017	Teen Choice Awards	Choice TV: LipLock	"Malec" (Magnus and Alec)	Nominated	
2017	Teen Choice Awards	Choice TV: Sci-Fi/Fantasy Actor	Matthew Daddario	Nominated	
2017	Teen Choice Awards	Choice TV: Sci-Fi/Fantasy Actress	Emeraude Toubia	Nominated	
2017	Teen Choice Awards	Choice TV: Sci-Fi/Fantasy Show	Shadowhunters	Nominated	
2017	Teen Choice Awards	Choice TV: Ship	"Malec" (Magnus and Alec)	Nominated	
2017	Teen Choice Awards	Choice TV: Summer Actor	Harry Shum Jr.	Nominated	
2018	Bisexual Representation Award	Best Bisexual Representation by a Supporting Character Male	Harry Shum Jr.	Won	
2018	GLAAD Awards	Outstanding Drama Series	Shadowhunters	Nominated	
2018	People's Choice Awards	Bingeworthy Show of 2018	Shadowhunters	Won	
2018	People's Choice Awards	Female TV Star of 2018	Katherine McNamara	Won	
2018	People's Choice Awards	Male TV Star of 2018	Harry Shum Jr.	Won	
2018	People's Choice Awards	Sci-Fi/Fantasy Show of 2018	Shadowhunters	Nominated	
2018	People's Choice Awards	Show of 2018	Shadowhunters	Won	
2018	Teen Choice Awards	Choice TV: Sci-Fi/Fantasy Actor	Matthew Daddario	Won	
2018	Teen Choice Awards	Choice TV: Sci-Fi/Fantasy Actor	Dominic Sherwood	Nominated	
2018	Teen Choice Awards	Choice TV: Sci-Fi/Fantasy Actress	Katherine McNamara	Nominated	
2018	Teen Choice Awards	Choice TV: Sci-Fi/Fantasy Actress	Emeraude Toubia	Nominated	
2018	Teen Choice Awards	Choice TV: Sci-Fi/Fantasy Show	Shadowhunters	Won	
2018	Teen Choice Awards	Choice TV: Ship	"Malec" (Magnus and Alec)	Nominated	
2018	Teen Choice Awards	Choice TV: Villain	Anna Hopkins	Nominated	
2019	GLAAD Awards	Outstanding Drama Series	Shadowhunters	Nominated	
2019	People's Choice Awards	Sci-Fi/Fantasy Show of 2019	Shadowhunters	Won	
2019	Teen Choice Awards	Choice Ship	"Clace" (Clary and Jace)	Nominated	
2019	Teen Choice Awards	Choice TV: Sci-Fi/Fantasy Actor	Dominic Sherwood	Nominated	
2019	Teen Choice Awards	Choice TV: Sci-Fi/Fantasy Actor	Harry Shum Jr.	Nominated	
2019	Teen Choice Awards	Choice TV: Sci-Fi/Fantasy Actress	Katherine McNamara	Won	
2019	Teen Choice Awards	Choice TV: Sci-Fi/Fantasy Show	Shadowhunters	Won	
2019	Teen Choice Awards	Choice TV: Villain	Luke Baines	Nominated	
2020	GLAAD Awards	Fan Favorite Award	Shadowhunters	Nominated	
2020	GLAAD Awards	Outstanding Drama Series	Shadowhunters	Nominated	
2020	Jupiter Award	Best TV Series International	Shadowhunters	Nominated	

== Home media releases ==
No subtitles are available on the Region 2 DVD and the United Kingdom Blu-ray. The Region 4 DVD has closed captions, excluding season 3 part B. None of them includes extra features.

Season	DVD release date		Blu-ray release date
Season	DVD release date		Region B
Season	Region 2	Region 4	United Kingdom
1	August 26, 2019	January 30, 2019	August 26, 2019
2	October 14, 2019	March 6, 2019	October 14, 2019
3	July 13, 2020	June 19, 2019 (S3 Part A); May 20, 2020 (S3 Part B)	July 13, 2020
1–3	July 13, 2020	October 28, 2020	July 13, 2020
