= Teen Choice Award for Choice Sci-Fi/Fantasy TV Actor =

Entertainment award category

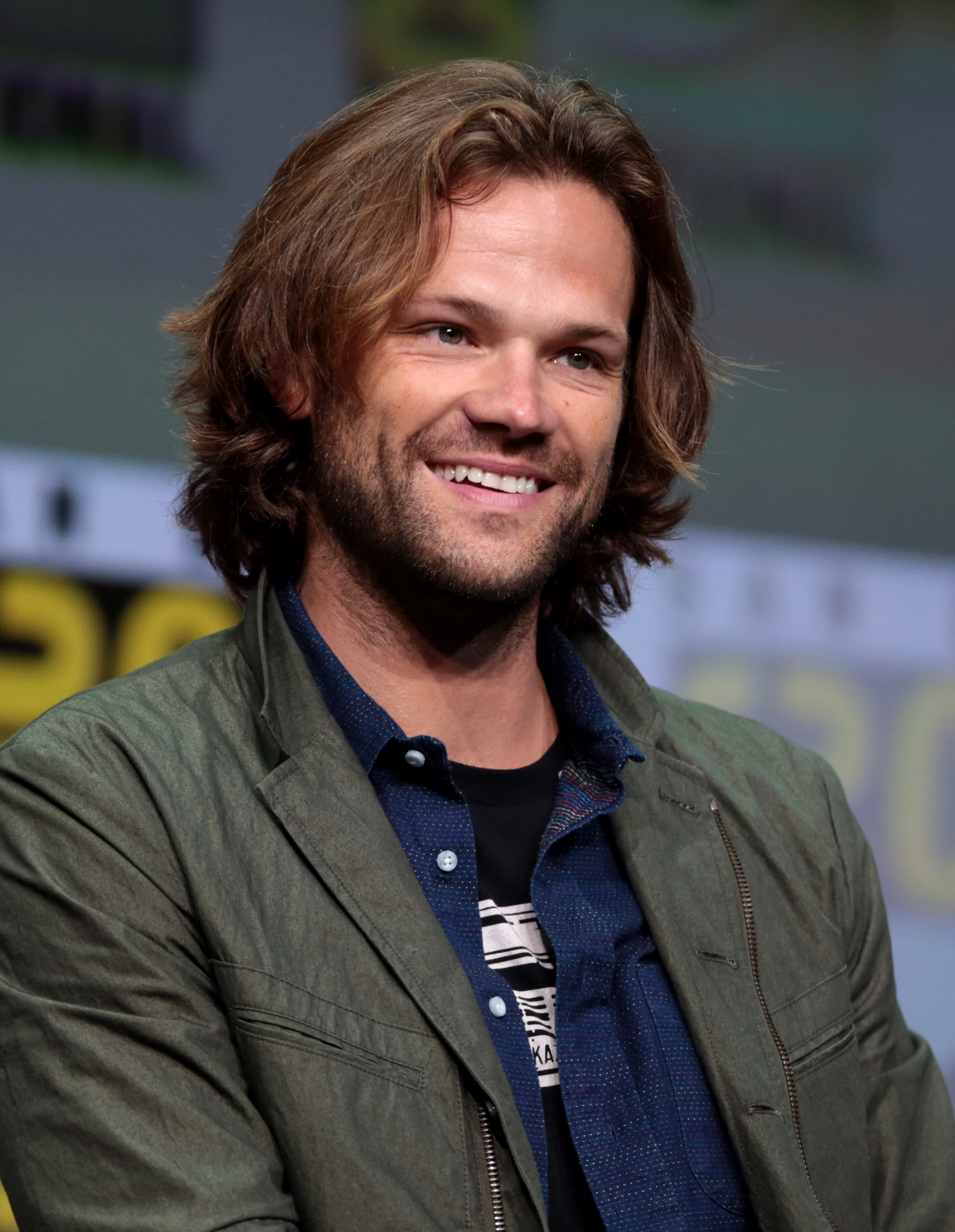
- 2019 Winner Jared Padalecki
- Country: United States
- First award: 2010
- Final award: 2019
- Currently held by: Jared Padalecki for Supernatural (2019)

Highlights
- Most wins: Ian Somerhalder (4)
- Most nominations: Ian Somerhalder (7) Paul Wesley (7)
- Website: http://www.teenchoice.com/

The following is a list of Teen Choice Award winners and nominees for Choice Sci-Fi/Fantasy TV Actor. The award was first introduced (along with Choice Sci-Fi/Fantasy TV Actress and Choice Sci-Fi/Fantasy TV Show) in 2010. Paul Wesley was the first recipient of the award.

The Choice Sci-Fi/Fantasy TV Actor has been won by Ian Somerhalder the most times, with four wins. Somerhalder and Wesley are the most nominated actors with seven nominations each, both actors for The Vampire Diaries.

The current winner as Choice Sci-Fi/Fantasy TV Actor is Jared Padalecki for Supernatural (2019).

== Winners and nominees ==
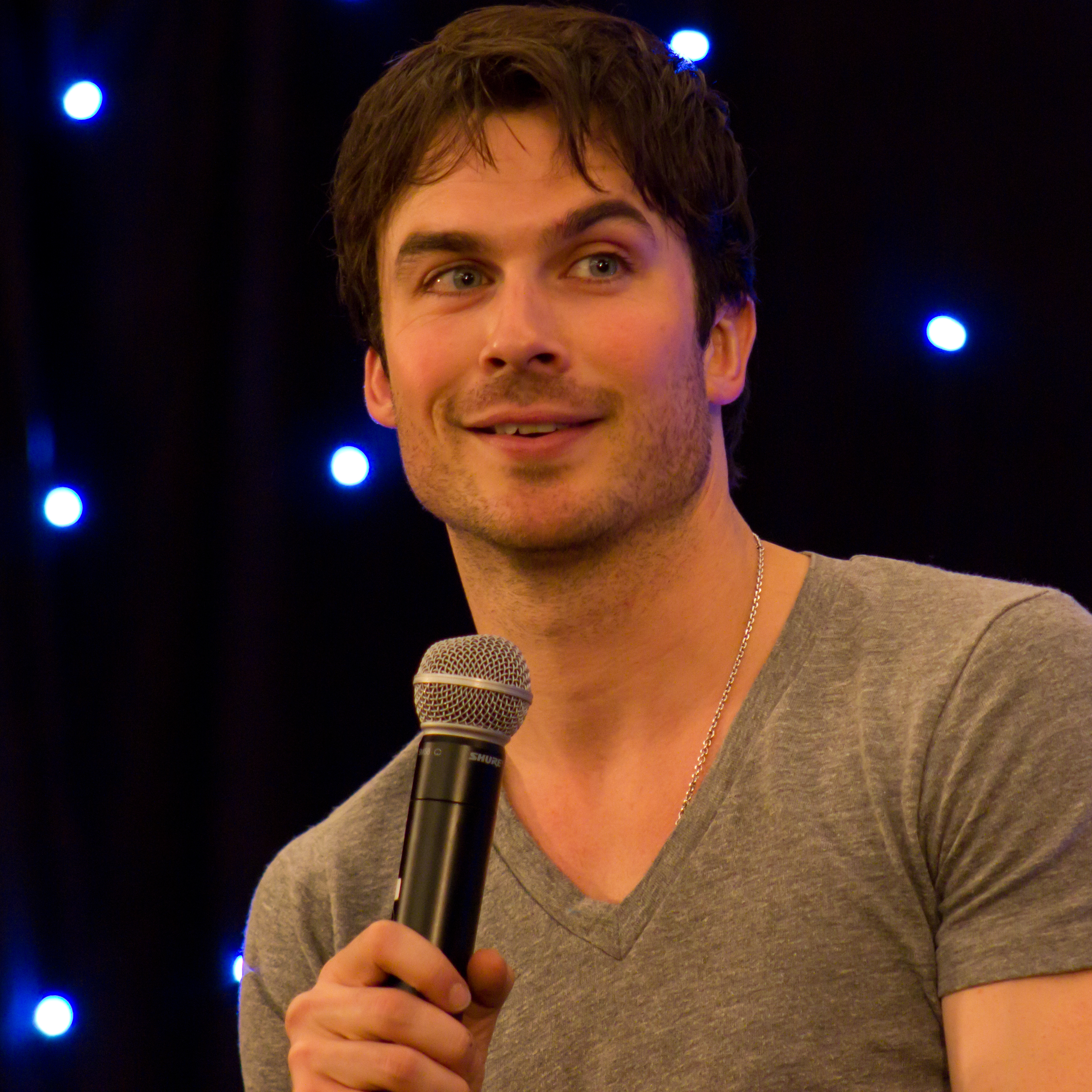
Ian Somerhalder is the actor with most wins in this category, with four of seven nominations.

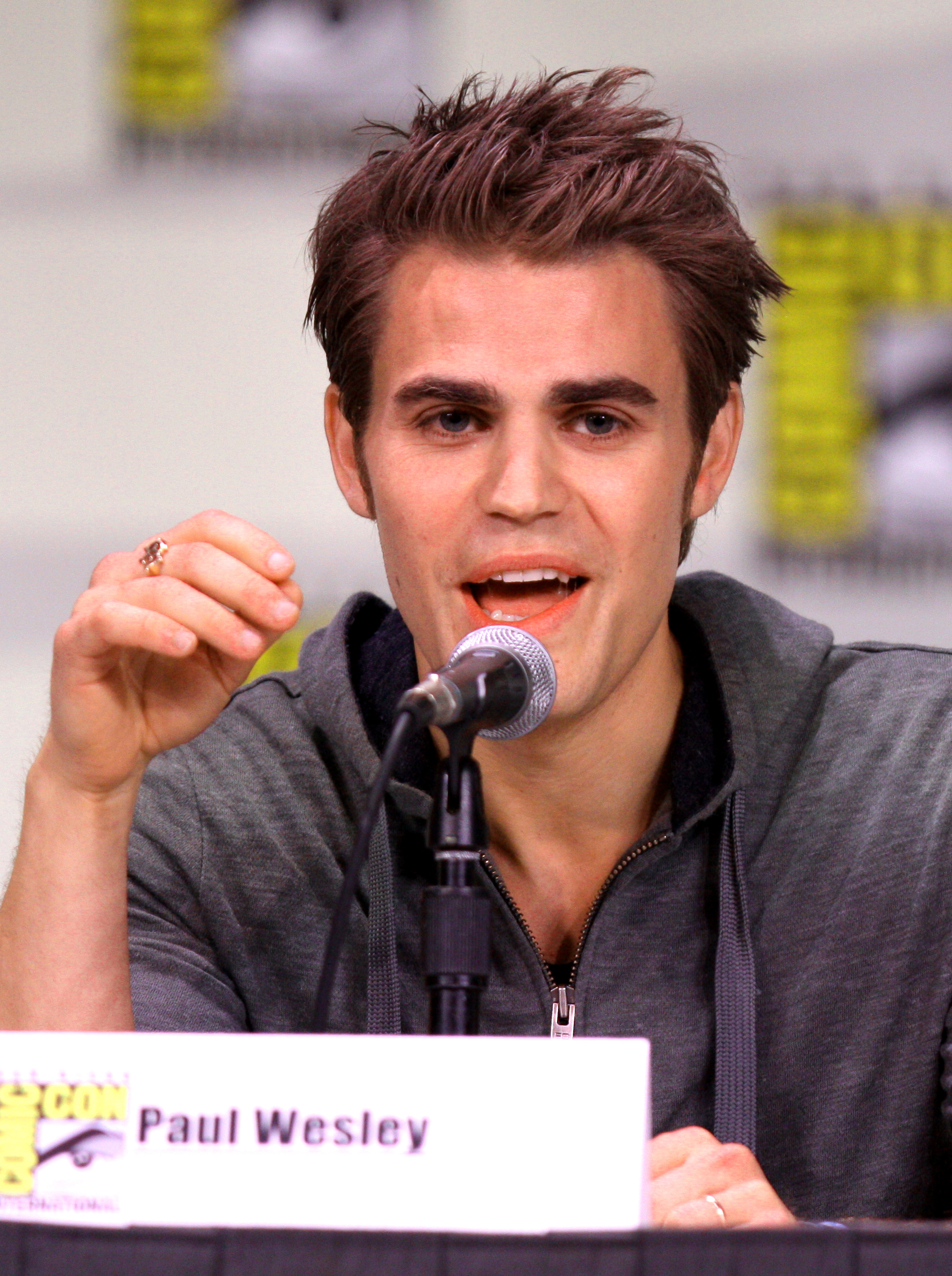
Paul Wesley was the first recipient of the award in 2010.

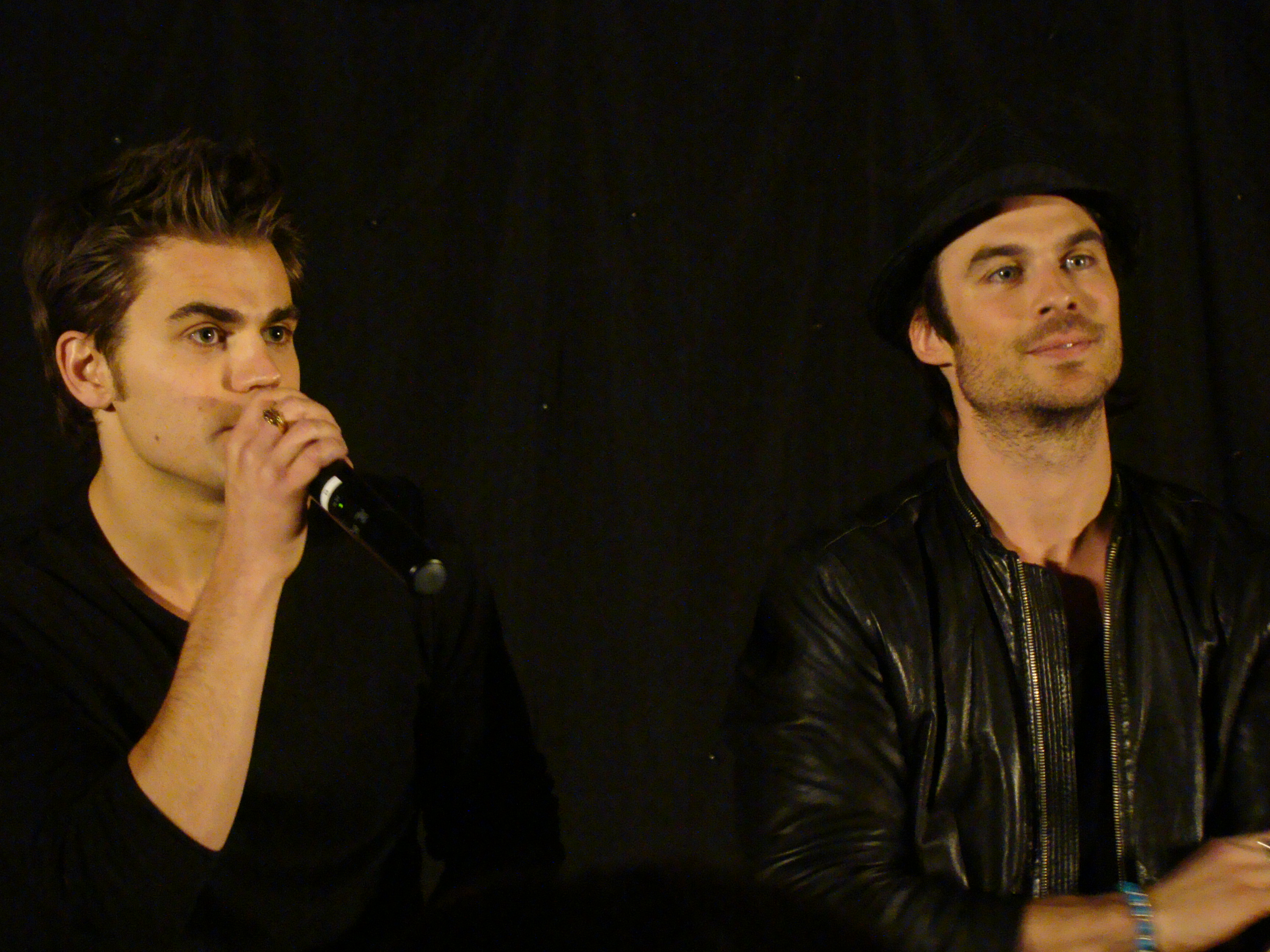
The Vampire Diaries stars Paul Wesley and Ian Somerhalder are the most nominated actors with seven nominations each.

=== 2010s ===
Year	Winner	Nominees	Ref.
2010	Paul Wesley – The Vampire Diaries	Josh Holloway – Lost; Joshua Jackson – Fringe; Ryan Kwanten – True Blood; Tom Welling – Smallville	
2011	Ian Somerhalder – The Vampire Diaries	Joshua Jackson – Fringe; Jared Padalecki – Supernatural; Tom Welling – Smallville; Paul Wesley – The Vampire Diaries	
2012	Ian Somerhalder – The Vampire Diaries	Jensen Ackles – Supernatural; Joshua Jackson – Fringe; Jared Padalecki – Supernatural; Paul Wesley – The Vampire Diaries	
2013	Ian Somerhalder – The Vampire Diaries	Jensen Ackles – Supernatural; Stephen Amell – Arrow; Jared Padalecki – Supernatural; Paul Wesley – The Vampire Diaries	
2014	Ian Somerhalder – The Vampire Diaries	Josh Dallas – Once Upon a Time; Joseph Morgan – The Originals; Tyler Posey – Teen Wolf; Paul Wesley – The Vampire Diaries	
2015	Jared Padalecki – Supernatural	Stephen Amell – Arrow; Joseph Morgan – The Originals; Bob Morley – The 100; Ian Somerhalder – The Vampire Diaries; Paul Wesley – The Vampire Diaries	
2016	Grant Gustin – The Flash	Andrew Lincoln – The Walking Dead; Joseph Morgan – The Originals; Jared Padalecki – Supernatural; Ian Somerhalder – The Vampire Diaries; Paul Wesley – The Vampire Diaries	
2017	Dylan O'Brien – Teen Wolf	Jensen Ackles – Supernatural; Matthew Daddario – Shadowhunters; Joseph Morgan – The Originals; Bob Morley – The 100; Ian Somerhalder – The Vampire Diaries	
2018	Matthew Daddario – Shadowhunters	Gaten Matarazzo – Stranger Things; Joseph Morgan – The Originals; Bob Morley – The 100; Dominic Sherwood – Shadowhunters; Finn Wolfhard – Stranger Things	
2019	Jared Padalecki – Supernatural	Aubrey Joseph – Cloak & Dagger; Ross Lynch – Chilling Adventures of Sabrina; Bob Morley – The 100; Dominic Sherwood – Shadowhunters; Harry Shum Jr. – Shadowhunters	

== Most wins ==
The following individuals received two or more Choice Sci-Fi/Fantasy TV Actor awards:

4 Wins

- Ian Somerhalder

2 Wins

- Jared Padalecki

== Most nominations ==
The following individuals received two or more Choice Sci-Fi/Fantasy TV Actor nominations:

7 Nominations

- Ian Somerhalder
- Paul Wesley

6 Nominations

- Jared Padalecki

5 Nominations

- Joseph Morgan

4 Nominations

- Bob Morley

3 Nominations

- Jensen Ackles
- Joshua Jackson

2 Nominations

- Stephen Amell
- Matthew Daddario
- Tom Welling
- Dominic Sherwood
