= Teen Choice Award for Choice Sci-Fi/Fantasy TV Actress =

Entertainment award category

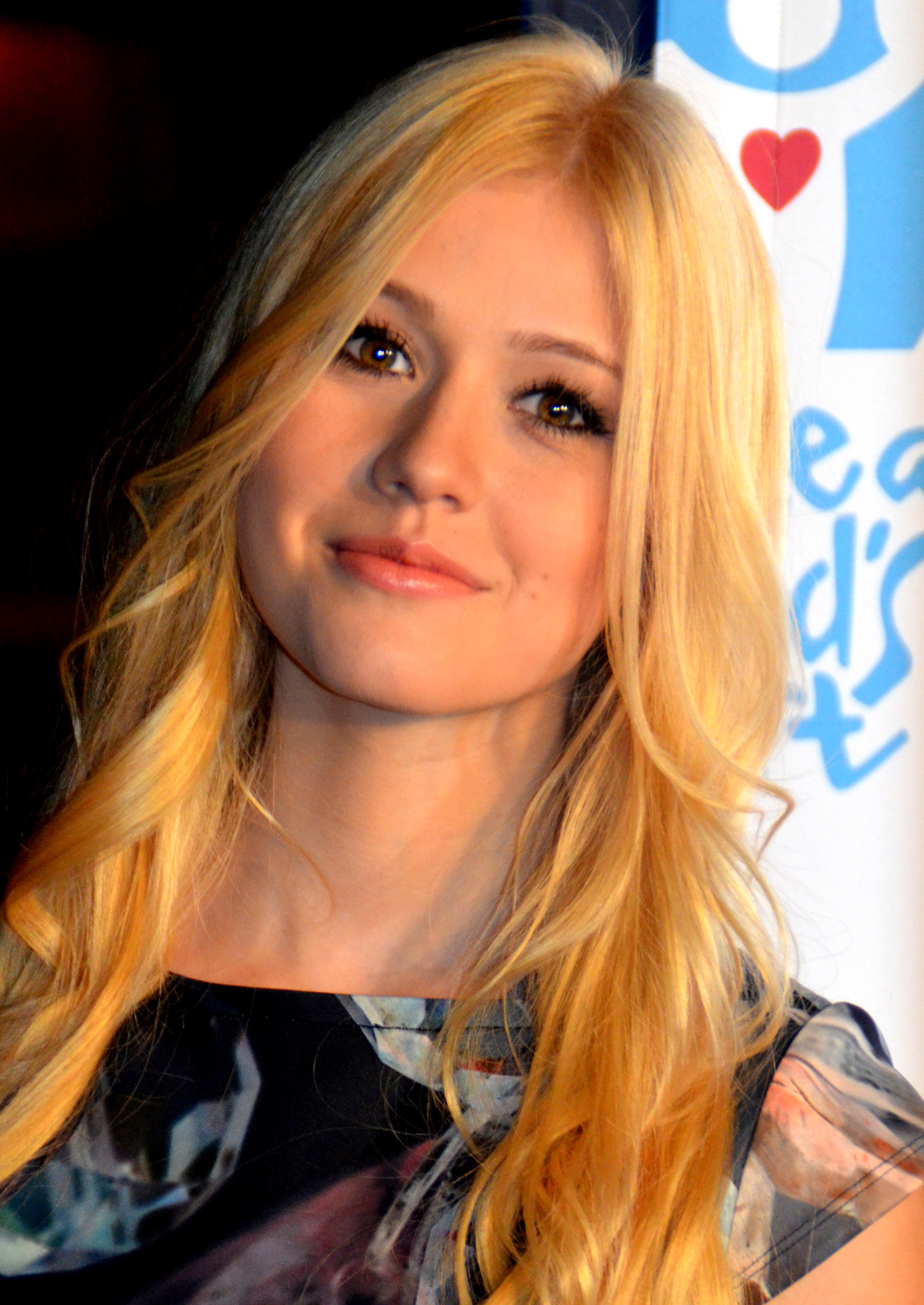
- 2019 Winner Katherine McNamara
- Country: United States
- First award: 2010
- Final award: 2019
- Currently held by: Katherine McNamara for Shadowhunters (2019)

Highlights
- Most wins: Nina Dobrev (6)
- Most nominations: Nina Dobrev (6)
- Website: http://www.teenchoice.com/

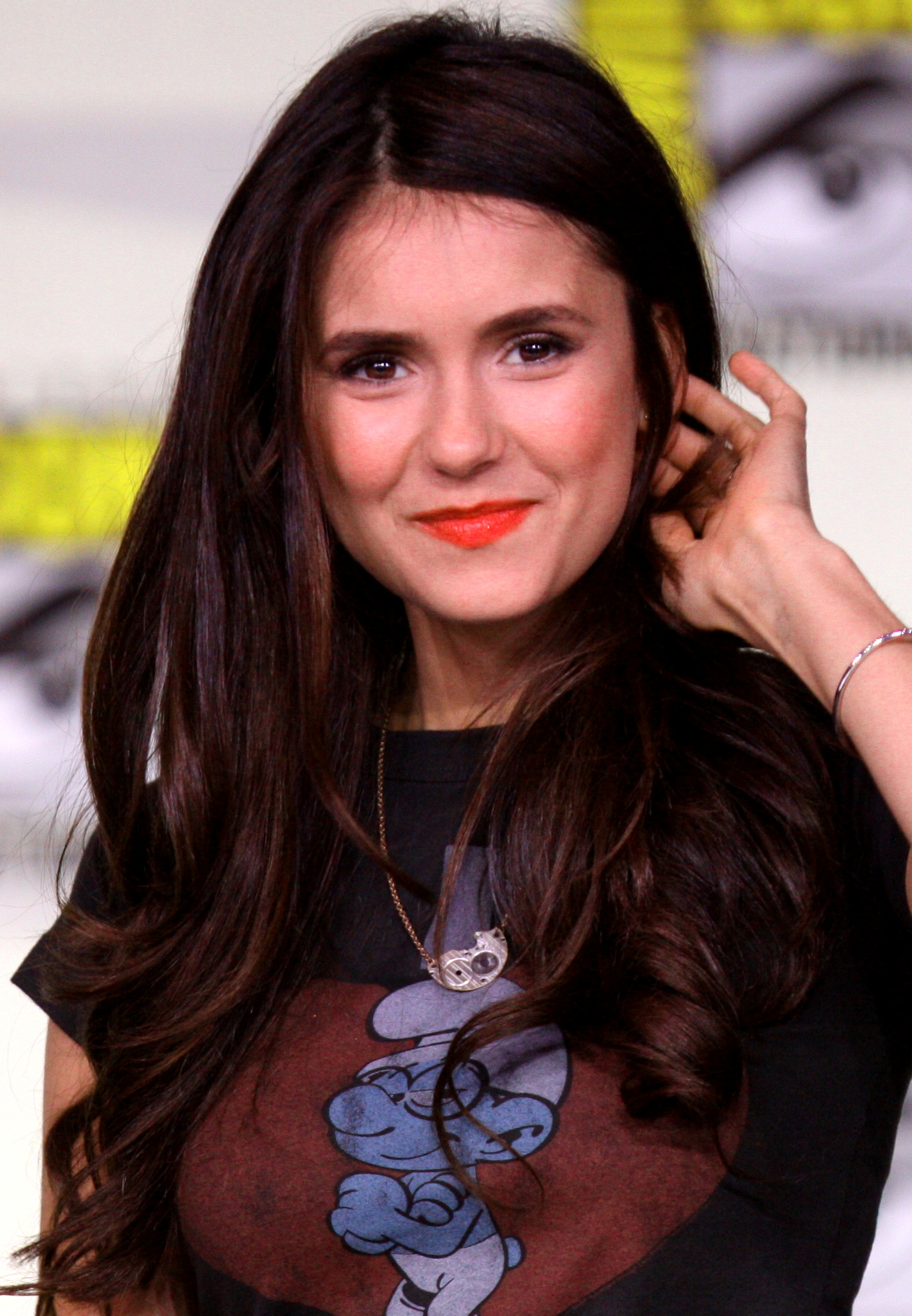
Nina Dobrev is the all-time winner and most nominated actress in this category with six wins of six nominations. She was the first recipient of the award in 2010.

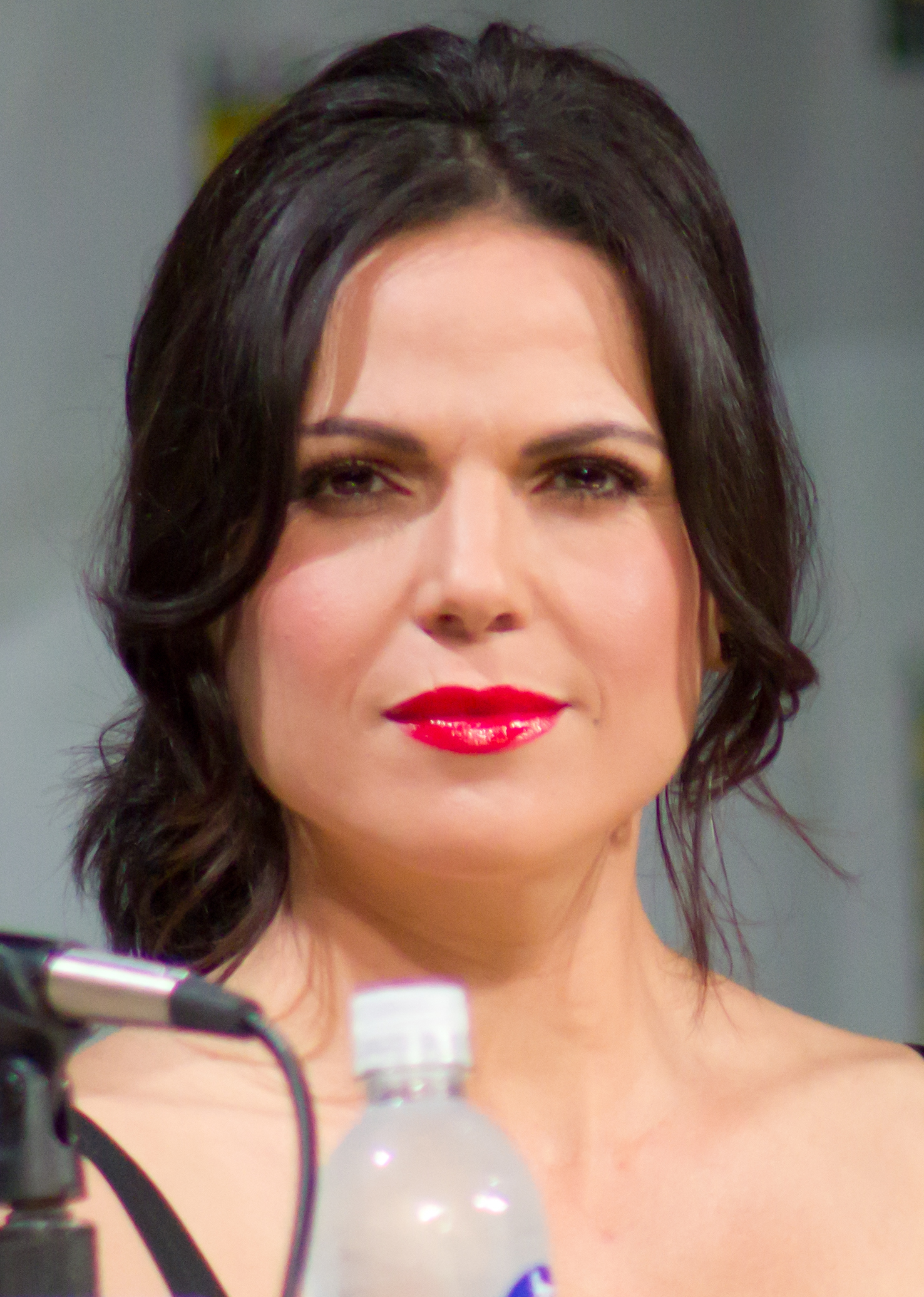
2016 winner and three-time nominee Lana Parrilla, star of Once Upon A Time.

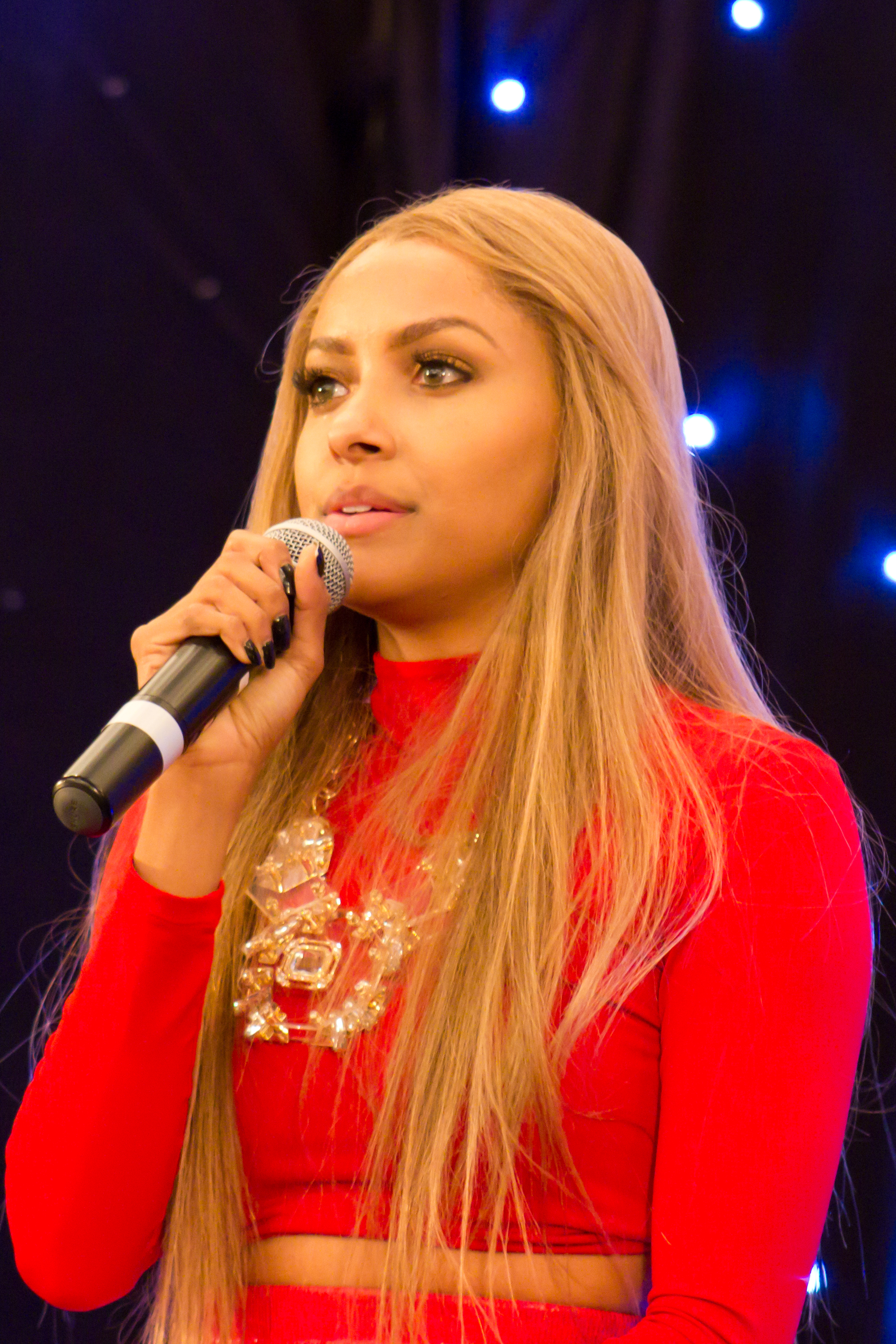
2017 winner Kat Graham and five-time nominee for The Vampire Diaries.

The following is a list of Teen Choice Award winners and nominees for Choice Sci-Fi/Fantasy TV Actress. The award was first introduced (along with Choice Sci-Fi/Fantasy TV Actor and Choice Sci-Fi/Fantasy TV Show) in 2010 with Nina Dobrev being the inaugural winner.

The Choice Sci-Fi/Fantasy TV Actress has been won by Nina Dobrev the most times, with six-consecutives wins. Dobrev is also the most nominated actress in this category with six nominations, all for The Vampire Diaries.

The current winner as Choice Sci-Fi/Fantasy TV Actress is Katherine McNamara for Shadowhunters (2019).

== Winners and nominees ==
=== 2010s ===
Year	Winner	Nominees	Ref.
2010	Nina Dobrev – The Vampire Diaries	Evangeline Lilly – Lost; Hayden Panettiere – Heroes; Anna Paquin – True Blood; Anna Torv – Fringe	
2011	Nina Dobrev – The Vampire Diaries	Erica Durance – Smallville; Anna Paquin – True Blood; Crystal Reed – Teen Wolf; Anna Torv – Fringe	
2012	Nina Dobrev – The Vampire Diaries	Ginnifer Goodwin – Once Upon a Time; Kat Graham – The Vampire Diarie; Anna Paquin – True Blood; Anna Torv – Fringe	
2013	Nina Dobrev – The Vampire Diaries	Katie Cassidy – Arrow; Ginnifer Goodwin – Once Upon a Time; Kat Graham – The Vampire Diaries; Kristin Kreuk – Beauty & the Beast	
2014	Nina Dobrev – The Vampire Diaries	Ginnifer Goodwin – Once Upon a Time; Kat Graham – The Vampire Diaries; Claire Holt – The Originals; Kristin Kreuk – Beauty & the Beast	
2015	Nina Dobrev – The Vampire Diaries	Candice Accola – The Vampire Diaries; Jennifer Morrison – Once Upon a Time; Danielle Panabaker – The Flash; Emily Bett Rickards – Arrow; Eliza Taylor – The 100	
2016	Lana Parrilla – Once Upon a Time	Kat Graham – The Vampire Diaries; Candice King – The Vampire Diaries; Danielle Panabaker – The Flash; Emily Bett Rickards – Arrow; Eliza Taylor – The 100	
2017	Kat Graham – The Vampire Diaries	Jennifer Morrison – Once Upon a Time; Lana Parrilla – Once Upon a Time; Abigail Spencer – Timeless; Eliza Taylor – The 100; Emeraude Toubia – Shadowhunters	
2018	Millie Bobby Brown - Stranger Things	Rose McIver – iZombie; Katherine McNamara – Shadowhunters; Lana Parrilla – Once Upon a Time; Eliza Taylor – The 100; Emeraude Toubia – Shadowhunters	
2019	Katherine McNamara – Shadowhunters	Melonie Diaz – Charmed; Olivia Holt – Cloak & Dagger; Elliot Page (Note: Credited as Ellen Page) – The Umbrella Academy; Danielle Rose Russell – Legacies; Kiernan Shipka – Chilling Adventures of Sabrina	

== Most wins ==
The following individuals received two or more Choice Sci-Fi/Fantasy TV Actress awards:

6 Wins

- Nina Dobrev

== Most nominations ==
The following individuals received two or more Choice Sci-Fi/Fantasy TV Actress nominations:

6 Nominations

- Nina Dobrev

5 Nominations

- Kat Graham

4 Nominations

- Eliza Taylor

3 Nominations

- Anna Torv
- Anna Paquin
- Ginnifer Goodwin
- Lana Parrilla

2 Nominations

- Danielle Panabaker
- Emeraude Toubia
- Emily Bett Rickards
- Jennifer Morrison
- Katherine McNamara
- Kristen Kreuk
