= Teen Choice Award for Choice Sci-Fi/Fantasy TV Show =

Entertainment award category

- Country: United States
- First award: 2010
- Final award: 2019
- Currently held by: Shadowhunters (2019)

Highlights
- Most wins: The Vampire Diaries (7)
- Most nominations: The Vampire Diaries (8) Supernatural (8)
- Website: http://www.teenchoice.com/

The following is a list of Teen Choice Award winners and nominees for Choice Sci-Fi/Fantasy TV Show. This award was first introduced (along with Choice Sci-Fi/Fantasy TV Actor and Choice Sci-Fi/Fantasy TV Actress) in 2010. The Vampire Diaries was the first recipient of the award.

The Vampire Diaries is the all-time winner in this category, with seven wins of eight nominations. Supernatural hold the record with most nominations (tied with The Vampire Diaries) without a single win (8 each).

Currently the last TV Show awarded as Choice Sci-Fi/Fantasy is Shadowhunters in 2019.

== Winners and nominees ==
=== 2010s ===
Year	Winner	Nominees	Ref.
2010	The Vampire Diaries	Fringe; Lost; Smallville; Supernatural	
2011	The Vampire Diaries	Fringe; Smallville; Supernatural; Teen Wolf	
2012	The Vampire Diaries	Fringe; Once Upon a Time; Supernatural; True Blood	
2013	The Vampire Diaries	Arrow; Beauty & the Beast; Once Upon a Time; Supernatural	
2014	The Vampire Diaries	Arrow; Once Upon a Time; Sleepy Hollow; Teen Wolf	
2015	The Vampire Diaries	The 100; Agents of S.H.I.E.L.D.; Arrow; Once Upon a Time; Sleepy Hollow	
2016	Once Upon a Time	Arrow; The Flash; iZombie; Supernatural; The Vampire Diaries	
2017	The Vampire Diaries	Shadowhunters; Stranger Things; Supernatural; Teen Wolf; Timeless	
2018	Shadowhunters	The 100; iZombie; The Originals; Stranger Things; Supernatural	
2019	Shadowhunters	The 100; Charmed; Chilling Adventures of Sabrina; Legacies; Supernatural	

== Series with multiple wins ==
The followings TV series received two or more Choice Sci-Fi/Fantasy awards:

7 Wins

- The Vampire Diaries

2 Wins

- Shadowhunters

== Series with multiple nominations ==
The followings TV series received two or more Choice Sci-Fi/Fantasy nominations:

8 Nominations

- The Vampire Diaries
- Supernatural

5 Nominations

- Once Upon a Time

4 Nominations

- Arrow

3 Nominations

- Fringe
- Shadowhunters
- Teen Wolf
- The 100

2 Nominations

- iZombie
- Smallville
- Sleepy Hollow
- Stranger Things
