= Taylor Caniff =

American Internet personality (born 1996)

- Born: February 3, 1996 (age 30); Princeton, Indiana, U.S.
- Occupation: Internet personality
- Years active: 2012–present
- Known for: YouTube and Vine videos

Taylor Michael Caniff (born February 3, 1996) is an American Internet personality, known for his appearances on YouTube and the video application Vine. Caniff later went on to appear in the Netflix reality series Chasing Cameron.

== Career ==
Caniff launched a YouTube channel in September 2012. He posted six second clips of pranks, comedy sketches and videos about his life on Vine in 2013. He later joined the Magcon (Meet and Greet Convention) touring group with Nash Grier, Cameron Dallas, Matthew Espinosa, Shawn Mendes, Aaron Carpenter, Carter Reynolds, Dj Mahogany Lox, Jacob Whitesides, Hayes Grier, Dylan Collins and Jack & Jack. In 2013-2014 the group toured the United States holding conventions where fans could meet and interact with the internet celebrities. The original Magcon group broke up after the tour ended in 2014. Caniff then traveled the United States with the DigiTour. In 2015 he embarked on his first solo tour, the RV Project Tour. In 2016 he went on parts of a world tour with a re-boot of Magcon, which included Aaron Carpenter, Cameron Dallas, Dylan Dauzat, Jacob Sartorius and other internet celebrities. That same year, Caniff co-starred in the Netflix reality series Chasing Cameron about the tour. He's done several tours throughout 2017.

=== Music ===
In 2014 Caniff formed a hip hop duo with Dillon Rupp named 2Virgins. On April 5 of that year the group released their debut single "Buckwild". Later in the year, the group released their second single "Like Whoo". In 2016 he released "Cash On Me" with Trey Schafer, about people who use celebrities and only want them for money and fame. He released others throughout the year.

== Filmography ==
Year	Film	Role	Notes
2016	Chasing Cameron	Himself	Netflix Original Series
2016	Chelsea	Himself	Episode: Both Naughty and Nice

== Discography ==
=== 2Virgins ===
Year	Title	Peak chart positions		Album
Year	Title	US R&B/HH Digital	US Rap Digital	Album
2014	Buckwild	22	14	N/A
2014	Like Whoo	30	17	N/A

== Awards and nominations ==
Year	Nominated	Award	Result
2016	2016 Teen Choice Awards	Choice snapchat: Male	Nominated
