= Daniel Skye =

American singer-songwriter

- Born: June 19, 2000 (age 25); Hollywood, Florida, U.S.
- Genres: dance-pop; Trap
- Occupations: singer; songwriter
- Years active: 2014 - 2021
- Label: RCA Records

Daniel Skye (now known as Skye for short) (born June 19, 2000) is an American former singer and songwriter, based in Los Angeles. His popularity on video and streaming services and achievements on the iTunes charts since the release of his first single in December 2014 led to his signing with RCA Records in September 2016.

== Life and career ==
Skye was born and raised in Hollywood, Florida. He is Jewish.

He began his route to popularity in an unusual way, by posting 15-second snippets of covers of popular songs on Instagram, where he has netted 2.5 million followers, rather than initially focusing on YouTube or other sites more commonly identified with music. He released his first original song, "Maybe," in December 2014. The video has been viewed over 4.6 million times on YouTube as of this writing.

His next original single was "LoveSick Day," followed in May 2015 by "All I Want" feat. Cameron Dallas, which debuted on iHeartRADIO and charted on iTunes in the United States, United Kingdom, Canada, Spain, Australia and Brazil, reaching #34 on its U.S. chart debut on May 4. The "All I Want" video was viewed more than 22 million times on YouTube, while the song received over 14 million streams on Spotify.

In 2015 he toured extensively, including on the DigiFest Tour with Demi Lovato, Magcon, Sunsation, Aaron Carpenter and others. He was also selected to perform as part of a Macy's back-to-school campaign that year.

The single "We Got Us," with over 5.9 million Spotify plays as of this writing, made him a Nickelodeon #BuzzTracks artist in March 2016. The video for his July 2016 single "Smile" amassed over 5.8 million views within six months on YouTube, and Tiger Beat nominated the song in the "Most Influential Song" category in the magazine's "19 Under 19" feature in September.

His September 2016 follow-up, "Good as it Gets," produced by Charlie Handsome (Kanye West, Ariana Grande, Mac Miller) and released in conjunction with his signing with RCA, netted over three million Spotify plays and three million YouTube views.

His first official single for RCA, "ON," was released in January 2017, and he went on tour with Bebe Rexha which began in March 2017. His next single for RCA "Stuck on You" feat. PnB Rock in November 2017.

Most of Skye’s music was influenced by his infamous on and off again relationship with Dahilia Thomas (a fellow musical artist and social media star) who got her Claim to fame on the once popular now closed app Musically. On March 30, 2018, Skye and Baby Ariel released a new single called “Say It”. This record is what was rumored to have led to the official breakup of Skye & Thomas in the spring of 2018.

On October 31, 2019, Skye released his single, "Voices", which featured verses from the late rapper, XXXTentacion, and sampled lyrics from blink-182's "I Miss You".
