= 2016 Teen Choice Awards =

American awards ceremony held in California

- Date: July 31, 2016
- Location: The Forum, Inglewood, California
- Hosted by: John Cena, Victoria Justice

Television/radio coverage
- Network: Fox Broadcasting Company
- Produced by: Production company: Bob Bain Productions, Good Entertainment; Producer: Paul Flattery, Kelly Brock, Gregory Sills (supervising producer); Executive producer: Bob Bain, Michael Burg

The 2016 Teen Choice Awards ceremony was held on July 31, 2016, at the Forum in Inglewood, California. The awards celebrate the year's achievements in music, film, television, sports, fashion, comedy, and the Internet, and were voted on by viewers living in the US, aged 13 and over through various social media sites. Justin Timberlake received the inaugural Decade Award. The ceremony was hosted by John Cena and Victoria Justice.

== Performers ==
- Flo Rida – "My House", "Good Feeling", "Wild Ones" (feat. Bebe Rexha) and "Zillionaire"
- Charlie Puth – "We Don't Talk Anymore"
- Ne-Yo – "What's Going On"
- Serayah – "Look But Don't Touch"
- Jason Derulo – "Kiss the Sky", "Whatcha Say", "Ridin' Solo", "Want to Want Me", "Wiggle" and "Talk Dirty"

== Presenters ==
- Ross Lynch and Gina Rodriguez—presented Choice Movie Actor: Sci-Fi/Fantasy
- Bebe Rexha, Alessia Cara and Kelsea Ballerini—presented Choice TV Actor: Sci-Fi/Fantasy
- Lea Michele and Bethany Mota—presented Choice TV: Drama
- Cat Deeley and Maddie Ziegler—introduced the finalists of So You Think You Can Dance: The Next Generation
- Sarah Hyland and John Stamos—presented Choice Summer TV Show
- Terrence J and Katie Nolan—introduced Charlie Puth
- Lana Parrilla and Paul Wesley—presented Choice TV: Comedy
- Kobe Bryant—presented the Decade Award
- Clayne Crawford and Damon Wayans—presented Choice Movie: Drama
- Jessica Alba—introduced the families and survivors who were affected by gun violence and Ne-Yo
- Hey Violet—presented Stride Mad Intense Winner Minute
- Matthew Daddario and The Bella Twins—presented Choice Movie: Breakout Star
- Anthony Anderson and Tracee Ellis Ross—presented Choice Movie Actress: Comedy
- Mark Consuelos and Kylie Bunbury—introduced Serayah
- Laura Marano and Maia Mitchell—presented Choice Web Stars: Male and Female

== Winners and nominees ==
The first wave of nominations were announced on May 24, 2016. The second wave was announced on June 9, 2016. The third and final wave was announced on July 6, 2016. Winners are listed first, in bold.

=== Movies ===
Choice Movie: Action	Choice Movie Actor: Action
**Deadpool**; The Divergent Series: Allegiant; In the Heart of the Sea; The Jungle Book; Maze Runner: The Scorch Trials; Spectre	**Dylan O'Brien – Maze Runner: The Scorch Trials as Thomas**; Chris Hemsworth – In the Heart of the Sea as Owen Chase; Theo James – The Divergent Series: Allegiant as Tobias "Four" Eaton; Ryan Reynolds – Deadpool as Wade Wilson / Deadpool; Neel Sethi – The Jungle Book as Mowgli
Choice Movie Actress: Action	Choice Movie: Sci-Fi/Fantasy
**Shailene Woodley – The Divergent Series: Allegiant as Beatrice "Tris" Prior**; Morena Baccarin – Deadpool as Vanessa Carlysle; Charlotte Riley – In the Heart of the Sea as Peggy Chase; Kaya Scodelario – Maze Runner: The Scorch Trials as Teresa; Léa Seydoux – Spectre as Madeleine Swann	**Captain America: Civil War**; Batman v Superman: Dawn of Justice; Fantastic Four; The Hunger Games: Mockingjay – Part 2; The Huntsman: Winter's War; Star Wars: The Force Awakens
Choice Movie Actor: Sci-Fi/Fantasy	Choice Movie Actress: Sci-Fi/Fantasy
**Chris Evans – Captain America: Civil War as Steve Rogers / Captain America**; Ben Affleck – Batman v Superman: Dawn of Justice as Bruce Wayne / Batman; Henry Cavill – Batman v Superman: Dawn of Justice as Clark Kent / Superman; Robert Downey Jr. – Captain America: Civil War as Tony Stark / Iron Man; Chris Hemsworth – The Huntsman: Winter's War as Eric the Huntsman; Josh Hutcherson – The Hunger Games: Mockingjay – Part 2 as Peeta Mellark	**Jennifer Lawrence – The Hunger Games: Mockingjay – Part 2 as Katniss Everdeen**; Amy Adams – Batman v Superman: Dawn of Justice as Lois Lane; Scarlett Johansson – Captain America: Civil War as Natasha Romanoff / Black Widow; Chloë Grace Moretz – The 5th Wave as Cassie Sullivan; Daisy Ridley – Star Wars: The Force Awakens as Rey; Charlize Theron – The Huntsman: Winter's War as Queen Ravenna
Choice Movie: Drama	Choice Movie Actor: Drama
**Miracles from Heaven**; 10 Cloverfield Lane; Creed; The Martian; Point Break; Straight Outta Compton	**Leonardo DiCaprio – The Revenant as Hugh Glass**; Matt Damon – The Martian as Mark Watney; Taron Egerton – Eddie the Eagle as Eddie "The Eagle" Edwards; O'Shea Jackson Jr. – Straight Outta Compton as O'Shea "Ice Cube" Jackson; Michael B. Jordan – Creed as Adonis Creed; Jacob Tremblay – Room as Jack Newsome
Choice Movie Actress: Drama	Choice Movie: Comedy
**Jennifer Lawrence – Joy as Joy Mangano**; Jessica Chastain – The Martian as Melissa Lewis; Jennifer Garner – Miracles from Heaven as Christy Beam; Brie Larson – Room as Joy "Ma" Newsome; Tessa Thompson – Creed as Bianca; Alicia Vikander – The Danish Girl as Gerda Wegener	**Ride Along 2**; Barbershop: The Next Cut; The Intern; Mother's Day; Mr. Right; Zoolander 2
Choice Movie Actor: Comedy	Choice Movie Actress: Comedy
**Zac Efron – Neighbors 2: Sorority Rising as Teddy Sanders**; Will Ferrell – Daddy's Home as Brad Whitaker; Kevin Hart – Ride Along 2 as Ben Barber; Ice Cube – Ride Along 2 as James Payton & Barbershop: The Next Cut as Calvin Palmer Jr.; Keegan-Michael Key – Keanu as Clarence Goobril / Smoke Dresden; Jordan Peele – Keanu as Rell Williams / Oil Dresden	**Chloë Grace Moretz – Neighbors 2: Sorority Rising as Shelby**; Jennifer Aniston – Mother's Day as Sandy Newhouse; Anne Hathaway – The Intern as Jules Ostin; Anna Kendrick – Mr. Right as Martha McKay; Melissa McCarthy – The Boss as Michelle Darnell; Nicki Minaj – Barbershop: The Next Cut as Draya
Choice Movie: Villain	Choice Movie: Scene Stealer
**Adam Driver – Star Wars: The Force Awakens as Kylo Ren**; Daniel Brühl – Captain America: Civil War as Helmut Zemo; Jesse Eisenberg – Batman v Superman: Dawn of Justice as Lex Luthor; Aidan Gillen – Maze Runner: The Scorch Trials as Janson; Ed Skrein – Deadpool as Francis Freeman / Ajax; Charlize Theron – The Huntsman: Winter's War as Queen Ravenna	**Jena Malone – The Hunger Games: Mockingjay – Part 2 as Johanna Mason**; Chadwick Boseman – Captain America: Civil War as T'Challa / Black Panther; Gal Gadot – Batman v Superman: Dawn of Justice as Diana Prince / Wonder Woman; Tom Holland – Captain America: Civil War as Peter Parker / Spider-Man; Evan Peters – X-Men: Apocalypse as Peter Maximoff / Quicksilver; Miles Teller – The Divergent Series: Allegiant as Peter Hayes
Choice Movie: Breakout Star	Choice Movie: Chemistry
**Daisy Ridley – Star Wars: The Force Awakens as Rey**; John Boyega – Star Wars: The Force Awakens as Finn; Gal Gadot – Batman v Superman: Dawn of Justice as Diana Prince / Wonder Woman; Brianna Hildebrand – Deadpool as Negasonic Teenage Warhead; Neel Sethi – The Jungle Book as Mowgli; Alexandra Shipp – X-Men: Apocalypse as Ororo Munroe / Storm	**Dylan O'Brien & Thomas Brodie-Sangster – Maze Runner: The Scorch Trials**; Robert Downey Jr., Scarlett Johansson, Don Cheadle, Paul Bettany, & Chadwick Boseman – Captain America: Civil War; Chris Evans, Sebastian Stan, Anthony Mackie, Elizabeth Olsen, & Jeremy Renner – Captain America: Civil War; Jennifer Lawrence & Josh Hutcherson – The Hunger Games: Mockingjay – Part 2; Daisy Ridley & John Boyega – Star Wars: The Force Awakens; Shailene Woodley & Theo James – The Divergent Series: Allegiant
Choice Movie: Liplock	Choice Movie: Hissy Fit
**Jennifer Lawrence & Josh Hutcherson – The Hunger Games: Mockingjay – Part 2**; Henry Cavill & Amy Adams – Batman v Superman: Dawn of Justice; Emilia Clarke & Sam Claflin – Me Before You; Chris Evans & Emily VanCamp – Captain America: Civil War; Chris Hemsworth & Jessica Chastain – The Huntsman: Winter's War; Shailene Woodley & Theo James – The Divergent Series: Allegiant	**Ryan Reynolds – Deadpool**; Adam Driver – Star Wars: The Force Awakens; Zac Efron – Neighbors 2: Sorority Rising; Kevin Hart – Ride Along 2; Hugh Jackman – X-Men: Apocalypse; Jason Sudeikis – The Angry Birds Movie
Choice Movie: Summer	Choice Movie Actor: Summer
**Finding Dory**; Central Intelligence; Ghostbusters; Independence Day: Resurgence; Now You See Me 2; X-Men: Apocalypse	**Kevin Hart – Central Intelligence as Calvin Joyner**; Stephen Amell – Teenage Mutant Ninja Turtles: Out of the Shadows as Casey Jones; Dave Franco – Now You See Me 2 as Jack Wilder; Chris Hemsworth – Ghostbusters as Kevin Beckman; Liam Hemsworth – Independence Day: Resurgence as Jake Morrison; Dwayne Johnson – Central Intelligence as Robbie Weirdicht / Bob Stone
Choice Movie Actress: Summer	Choice Movie: AnTEENcipated
**Ellen DeGeneres – Finding Dory as Dory**; Lizzy Caplan – Now You See Me 2 as Lula May; Megan Fox – Teenage Mutant Ninja Turtles: Out of the Shadows as April O'Neil; Blake Lively – The Shallows as Nancy Adams; Melissa McCarthy – Ghostbusters as Abby Yates; Kristen Wiig – Ghostbusters as Erin Gilbert	**Suicide Squad**; Fantastic Beasts and Where to Find Them; Jason Bourne; Rogue One: A Star Wars Story; Star Trek Beyond; Trolls
Choice Movie Actor: AnTEENcipated	Choice Movie Actress: AnTEENcipated
**Dylan O'Brien – Deepwater Horizon as Caleb Holloway**; Matt Damon – Jason Bourne as Jason Bourne; Scott Eastwood – Suicide Squad as GQ Edwards; Chris Pine – Star Trek Beyond as James T. Kirk; Chris Pratt – The Magnificent Seven as Joshua Faraday; Will Smith – Suicide Squad as Floyd Lawton / Deadshot	**Cara Delevingne – Suicide Squad as June Moone / Enchantress**; Anna Kendrick – The Hollars as Rebecca; Margot Robbie – Suicide Squad as Harleen Quinzel / Harley Quinn; Britt Robertson – The Space Between Us as Tulsa; Zoe Saldaña – Star Trek Beyond as Lieutenant Nyota Uhura; Alicia Vikander – Jason Bourne as Heather Lee

=== Television ===
Choice TV Show: Drama	Choice TV Actor: Drama
**Pretty Little Liars**; Empire; Gotham; Grey's Anatomy; Rosewood; Shades of Blue	**Ian Harding – Pretty Little Liars as Ezra Fitz**; Keegan Allen – Pretty Little Liars as Toby Cavanaugh; Tyler Blackburn – Pretty Little Liars as Caleb Rivers; Terrence Howard – Empire as Lucious Lyon; Ben McKenzie – Gotham as James Gordon; Jussie Smollett – Empire as Jamal Lyon
Choice TV Actress: Drama	Choice TV Show: Sci-Fi/Fantasy
**Ashley Benson – Pretty Little Liars as Hanna Marin**; Troian Bellisario – Pretty Little Liars as Spencer Hastings; Taraji P. Henson – Empire as Loretha "Cookie" Lyon; Jennifer Lopez – Shades of Blue as Harlee Santos; Maia Mitchell – The Fosters as Callie Adams-Foster; Kerry Washington – Scandal as Olivia Pope	**Once Upon a Time**; Arrow; The Flash; iZombie; Supernatural; The Vampire Diaries
Choice TV Actor: Sci-Fi/Fantasy	Choice TV Actress: Sci-Fi/Fantasy
**Grant Gustin – The Flash as Barry Allen / The Flash**; Andrew Lincoln – The Walking Dead as Rick Grimes; Joseph Morgan – The Originals as Niklaus "Klaus" Mikaelson; Jared Padalecki – Supernatural as Sam Winchester; Ian Somerhalder – The Vampire Diaries as Damon Salvatore; Paul Wesley – The Vampire Diaries as Stefan Salvatore	**Lana Parrilla – Once Upon a Time as Regina Mills / Evil Queen**; Kat Graham – The Vampire Diaries as Bonnie Bennett; Candice King – The Vampire Diaries as Caroline Forbes; Danielle Panabaker – The Flash as Caitlin Snow / Killer Frost; Emily Bett Rickards – Arrow as Felicity Smoak / Overwatch; Eliza Taylor – The 100 as Clarke Griffin
Choice TV Show: Comedy	Choice TV Actor: Comedy
**Fuller House**; Austin & Ally; Jane the Virgin; Liv and Maddie; Modern Family; Scream Queens	**Ross Lynch – Austin & Ally as Austin Moon**; Anthony Anderson – Black-ish as Andre "Dre" Johnson Sr.; Jaime Camil – Jane the Virgin as Rogelio de la Vega; Taylor Lautner – Cuckoo as Dale Ashbrick Jr.; Jim Parsons – The Big Bang Theory as Sheldon Cooper; Andy Samberg – Brooklyn Nine-Nine as Jake Peralta
Choice TV Actress: Comedy	Choice TV Show: Animated
**Candace Cameron Bure – Fuller House as D.J. Tanner-Fuller**; Dove Cameron – Liv and Maddie as Liv & Maddie Rooney; Laura Marano – Austin & Ally as Ally Dawson; Lea Michele – Scream Queens as Hester Ulrich; Emma Roberts – Scream Queens as Chanel Oberlin; Gina Rodriguez – Jane the Virgin as Jane Gloriana Villanueva	**Family Guy**; Descendants: Wicked World; Gravity Falls; Over the Garden Wall; The Simpsons; Steven Universe
Choice TV Show: Reality	Choice TV: Villain
**Keeping Up with the Kardashians**; Dance Moms; MasterChef Junior; Mob Wives; Total Divas; The Voice	**Janel Parrish – Pretty Little Liars as Mona Vanderwaal**; Brett Dalton – Agents of S.H.I.E.L.D. as Hive; Greg Germann – Once Upon a Time as Hades; Lea Michele – Scream Queens as Hester Ulrich; Cameron Monaghan – Gotham as Jerome Valeska; Teddy Sears – The Flash as Hunter Zolomon / Zoom
Choice TV: Scene Stealer	Choice TV: Breakout Star
**Sasha Pieterse – Pretty Little Liars as Alison DiLaurentis**; Becky G – Empire as Valentina Galindo; Misha Collins – Supernatural as Castiel; Tahj Mowry – Baby Daddy as Tucker Dobbs; Serayah – Empire as Tiana Brown; Hudson Yang – Fresh Off the Boat as Edwyn "Eddie" Huang	**Matthew Daddario – Shadowhunters as Alec Lightwood**; Priyanka Chopra – Quantico as Alex Parrish; Tom Ellis – Lucifer as Lucifer Morningstar; Emma Ishta – Stitchers as Kirsten Clark; Katherine McNamara – Shadowhunters as Clarissa "Clary Fray" Fairchild; Cam Newton – All In with Cam Newton as Himself
Choice TV Show: Breakout	Choice TV: Chemistry
**Shadowhunters**; Legends of Tomorrow; Lucifer; Quantico; Stitchers; Supergirl	**Ashley Benson and Tyler Blackburn – Pretty Little Liars**; Candace Cameron Bure, Jodie Sweetin, & Andrea Barber – Fuller House; Grant Gustin & Candice Patton – The Flash; Jared Padalecki & Misha Collins – Supernatural; Ian Somerhalder & Kat Graham – The Vampire Diaries; Eliza Taylor & Bob Morley – The 100
Choice TV: Liplock	Choice TV Show: Summer
**Jennifer Morrison & Colin O'Donoghue – Once Upon a Time**; Stephen Amell & Emily Bett Rickards – Arrow; Grant Gustin & Candice Patton – The Flash; Joseph Morgan & Leah Pipes – The Originals; Derek Theler & Chelsea Kane – Baby Daddy; Paul Wesley & Candice King – The Vampire Diaries	**Teen Wolf**; Baby Daddy; The Fosters; Girl Meets World; So You Think You Can Dance; Young & Hungry
Choice TV Actor: Summer	Choice TV Actress: Summer
**Dylan O'Brien – Teen Wolf as Stiles Stilinski**; Jean-Luc Bilodeau – Baby Daddy as Benjamin "Ben" Wheeler; David Lambert – The Fosters as Brandon Foster; Peyton Meyer – Girl Meets World as Lucas Friar; Tyler Posey – Teen Wolf as Scott McCall; Gregg Sulkin – Faking It as Liam Booker	**Shelley Hennig – Teen Wolf as Malia Tate**; Rowan Blanchard – Girl Meets World as Riley Matthews; Lucy Hale – Pretty Little Liars as Aria Montgomery; Shay Mitchell – Pretty Little Liars as Emily Fields; Emily Osment – Young & Hungry as Gabi Diamond; Cierra Ramirez – The Fosters as Mariana Adams-Foster

=== Music ===
Choice Music: Male Artist	Choice Music: Female Artist
**Justin Bieber**; Drake; Nick Jonas; Shawn Mendes; Charlie Puth; Zayn	**Selena Gomez**; Beyoncé; Ariana Grande; Demi Lovato; Rihanna; Taylor Swift
Choice Music: Group	Choice Music: R&B/Hip-Hop Artist
**One Direction**; 5 Seconds of Summer; The Chainsmokers; DNCE; Fall Out Boy; Fifth Harmony	**Beyoncé**; Jason Derulo; Drake; Iggy Azalea; Nicki Minaj; The Weeknd
Choice Music: Country Artist	Choice Music Single: Male Artist
**Carrie Underwood**; Kelsea Ballerini; Luke Bryan; Hunter Hayes; Sam Hunt; Blake Shelton	**"Sorry" – Justin Bieber**; "Close" – Nick Jonas feat. Tove Lo; "My House" – Flo Rida; "One Call Away" – Charlie Puth; "Pillowtalk" – Zayn Malik; "Youth" – Troye Sivan
Choice Music Single: Female Artist	Choice Music Single: Group
**"Dangerous Woman" – Ariana Grande**; "Confident" – Demi Lovato; "Hands to Myself" – Selena Gomez; "Hello" – Adele; "New Romantics" – Taylor Swift; "No" – Meghan Trainor	**"Home" – One Direction**; "Cake by the Ocean" – DNCE; "She's Kinda Hot" – 5 Seconds of Summer; "Stressed Out" – Twenty One Pilots; "Wake Up" – The Vamps; "Work from Home" – Fifth Harmony feat. Ty Dolla $ign
Choice Music: Country Song	Choice Music: R&B/Hip-Hop Song
**"Without a Fight" – Brad Paisley feat. Demi Lovato**; "Church Bells" – Carrie Underwood; "Go Ahead and Break My Heart" – Blake Shelton feat. Gwen Stefani; "H.O.L.Y." – Florida Georgia Line; "Make You Miss Me" – Sam Hunt; "Peter Pan" – Kelsea Ballerini	**"One Dance" – Drake feat. Wizkid & Kyla**; "Chasing the Sky" – Cast of Empire feat. Terrence Howard, Jussie Smollett, & Bryshere Y. Gray; "Panda" – Desiigner; "Something New" – Zendaya feat. Chris Brown; "Team" – Iggy Azalea; "Work" – Rihanna feat. Drake
Choice Music: Rock Song	Choice Music: Love Song
**"Jet Black Heart" – 5 Seconds of Summer**; "America's Sweetheart" – Elle King; "HandClap" – Fitz and the Tantrums; "Stressed Out" – Twenty One Pilots; "Walking on a Dream" – Empire of the Sun; "Wherever I Go" – OneRepublic	**"Perfect" – One Direction**; "Close" – Nick Jonas feat. Tove Lo; "Hands to Myself" – Selena Gomez; "Into You" – Ariana Grande; "Secret Love Song" – Little Mix; "Vapor" – 5 Seconds of Summer
Choice Music: Break-Up Song	Choice Music: Party Song
**"Love Yourself" – Justin Bieber**; "I Know What You Did Last Summer" – Shawn Mendes and Camila Cabello; "Never Forget You" – MNEK & Zara Larsson; "Same Old Love" – Selena Gomez; "Stone Cold" – Demi Lovato; "We Don't Talk Anymore" – Charlie Puth feat. Selena Gomez	**"Cake by the Ocean" – DNCE**; "Break a Sweat" – Becky G; "Can't Stop the Feeling!" – Justin Timberlake; "Cheap Thrills" – Sia feat. Sean Paul; "My House" – Flo Rida; "This Is What You Came For" – Calvin Harris feat. Rihanna
Choice Music: Song from a Movie or TV Show	Choice Music: Breakout Artist
**"I'm in Love with a Monster" from Hotel Transylvania 2 – Fifth Harmony**; "Can't Stop the Feeling!" from Trolls – Justin Timberlake; "Castle" from The Huntsman: Winter's War – Halsey; "I Will Survive" from The Angry Birds Movie – Demi Lovato; "Just Like Fire" from Alice Through the Looking Glass – Pink; "Try Everything" from Zootopia – Shakira	**Zayn**; Alessia Cara; DNCE; Bea Miller; Charlie Puth; Troye Sivan
Choice Music: Next Big Thing	Choice Music: Summer Song
**Hey Violet**; Sofia Carson; New District; Leroy Sanchez; Grace; Ruth B	"Work from Home" – Fifth Harmony feat. Ty Dolla $ign; "7 Years" – Lukas Graham; "Cake by the Ocean" – DNCE; "Can't Stop the Feeling!" – Justin Timberlake; "Like I Would" – Zayn Malik; "This Is What You Came For" – Calvin Harris feat. Rihanna
Choice Music: Summer Artist – Male	Choice Music: Summer Artist – Female
**Zayn**; Justin Bieber; Drake; Nick Jonas; Shawn Mendes; Pitbull	**Selena Gomez**; Ariana Grande; Demi Lovato; P!nk; Rihanna; Gwen Stefani
Choice Music: Summer Group	Choice Music: Summer Tour
**5 Seconds of Summer**; The 1975; The Chainsmokers; DNCE; Fifth Harmony; OneRepublic	**Sounds Live Feels Live Tour – 5 Seconds of Summer**; The 7/27 Tour – Fifth Harmony; Future Now Tour – Demi Lovato and Nick Jonas; Purpose World Tour – Justin Bieber; Revival Tour – Selena Gomez; Shawn Mendes World Tour – Shawn Mendes
Choice Music: International Artist	
**Little Mix**; J Balvin; EXO; Girls' Generation; Zara Larsson; Super Junior	

=== Digital ===
Choice Web Star: Male	Choice Web Star: Female
**The Dolan Twins**; Cameron Dallas; Joey Graceffa; Hayes Grier; Nash Grier; Tyler Oakley	**Lilly Singh**; Colleen Ballinger; Eva Gutowski; Gabbie Hanna; Jenn McAllister; Bethany Mota
Choice Web Star: Comedy	Choice Web Star: Fashion/Beauty
**Lilly Singh**; Colleen Ballinger; Kaelem; Ryan Higa; The Janoskians; Smosh	**Bethany Mota**; Kandee Johnson; Rachel Levin; Bunny Meyer; Niki and Gabi; Michelle Phan
Choice Web Star: Music	Choice Social Media King
**Christina Grimmie**; Boyce Avenue; Chloe x Halle; Cimorelli; MattyBRaps; Johnny Orlando	**Cameron Dallas**; Justin Bieber; LeBron James; Dwayne Johnson; Kanye West; Zayn
Choice Social Media Queen	Choice Twit
**Fifth Harmony**; Miley Cyrus; Gigi Hadid; Kim Kardashian; Lady Gaga; Britney Spears	**Justin Bieber**; Kevin Hart; Lady Gaga; Katy Perry; Britney Spears; Kanye West
Choice Viner	Choice Instagramer
**Lele Pons**; Matthew Espinosa; Gabbie Hanna; Zach King; Josh Peck; Thomas Sanders	**Selena Gomez**; Justin Bieber; Blake Gray; Kim Kardashian; Hunter Rowland; Britney Spears
Choice YouTuber	Choice Snapchatter
**The Dolan Twins**; Meg DeAngelis; Connor Franta; Eva Gutowski; Kian Lawley; Lilly Singh	**Kylie Jenner**; Taylor Caniff; DJ Khaled; Gigi Hadid; Logan Paul; Brandon Rowland
Choice Muser	Choice Fandom
**Baby Ariel**; Loren Beech; Kristen Hancher; Ariana Renee; Jacob Sartorius; Mackenzie Ziegler	**One Direction**; 5 Seconds of Summer; Justin Bieber; Fifth Harmony; Super Junior; Zayn

=== Fashion ===
Choice Hottie: Male	Choice Hottie: Female
**Harry Styles**; Justin Bieber; Cameron Dallas; Austin Mahone; Zayn Malik; Jussie Smollett	**Kendall Jenner**; Hailey Baldwin; Selena Gomez; Gigi Hadid; Demi Lovato; Bella Thorne
Choice Style: Male	Choice Style: Female
**Nick Jonas**; Brooklyn Beckham; Bryshere Y. Gray; Colton Haynes; Kanye West; Zayn	**Zendaya**; Becky G; Kesha; Blake Lively; Willow Smith; Bella Thorne

=== Sports ===
Choice Athlete: Male	Choice Athlete: Female
**Stephen Curry**; Kobe Bryant; John Cena; Peyton Manning; Roman Reigns; Cristiano Ronaldo	**The Bella Twins**; Simone Biles; Alex Morgan; Danica Patrick; Ronda Rousey; Serena Williams
Choice Sports Team	
**United States 2016 Olympic Team**; Cleveland Cavaliers; Denver Broncos; FC Barcelona; Golden State Warriors; San Jose Sharks	

=== Miscellaneous ===
Choice Comedian	Choice Dancer
**Ellen DeGeneres**; Aziz Ansari; James Corden; Jordan Doww; Jimmy Fallon; Kevin Hart	**Maddie Ziegler**; Misty Copeland; Kalani Hilliker; Derek Hough; Julianne Hough; Chloe Lukasiak
Choice Model	Choice Selfie Taker
**Kendall Jenner**; Hailey Baldwin; Ashley Graham; Gigi Hadid; Winnie Harlow; Chanel Iman	**Ariana Grande**; Justin Bieber; Miley Cyrus; Kylie Jenner; Kim Kardashian; Lady Gaga

== Controversy ==
In June 2016, singer Christina Grimmie was murdered at a meet-and-greet event. Her family and fans expressed disappointment that Grimmie was not mentioned during the show, especially during the #StoptheViolence tribute, which was presented by actress Jessica Alba and singer Ne-Yo and honored the family members of teens who had died as a result of violence.
