= Famous Birthdays =

Website cataloging celebrity birthdays and facts

- Logo as of 2014

- The Famous Birthdays homepage as it appeared on January 8, 2025
- Website type: Private
- Available in: English; Spanish; Portuguese; French
- Founded: November 7, 2012; 13 years ago (current)
- Headquarters: Santa Monica, California, {{{location_country}}}
- Creator: Edward Morykwas (original)
- Key people: Evan Britton
- Launched: 1996; 30 years ago (original)
- Current status: Active
- Written in: HTML, JavaScript

Famous Birthdays is an American website based in Santa Monica, California, which is dedicated to cataloging the birthdays of famous people and compiling other facts about them.

== Background ==
The original Famous Birthdays website was created by Edward Morykwas, a Michigan schoolteacher, in 1996. It offered e-cards.

The site was updated to its current format in November 7, 2012, by Evan Britton, who has since described the website as "Wikipedia for Generation Z". Famous Birthdays originally focused on more traditional celebrities (such as actors, athletes, musicians, etc.), but has since expanded to also feature internet personalities. This shift came after Britton discovered that visitors were searching for individuals unfamiliar to him; at first mistaking the traffic as spam, he realized that the searches were of people with online followings such as Cameron Dallas.

== Status ==
In 2015, Britton's eighteen-person team attended VidCon. As of January 2018, it had over 150,000 biographies. In July 2018, Famous Birthdays launched Famous Birthdays Español, a Spanish-language version of the site. In 2019, it had 20 million unique visitors each month. The same year, journalist Taylor Lorenz of The Atlantic described a Famous Birthdays page as a "status symbol" or "badge of honor" for internet personalities, noting its teenage and Generation Z demographic and Lorenz for The New York Times calling it a "a milestone in any influencer's career." As of June 2024 the website received 20 million unique visitors each month.

== Features ==
Despite its name, Famous Birthdays also includes entire staff-written biographies. Each page has a "boost" button—each visitor who clicks this button will "boost" the biography higher up into the "trending" or "most popular" rankings. Online celebrities may canvass their followers into swaying them higher into the rankings by encouraging them to press the "boost" button. Biographies tend to be of the same length, despite the relative fame of the individual in question.
