= Trapp Mendoza =

American rapper

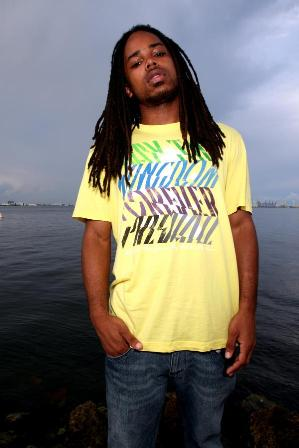

Background information
- Born: Greg Dukes; May 13, 1984 (age 42)
- Origin: Carol City, Florida, United States
- Genre: Hip hop
- Occupation: Rapper
- Years active: 1999 – present
- Label: unsigned
- Website: www.myspace.com/trappmendoza305

Born on May 13, 1984, Greg Dukes, better known by his stage name, Trapp Mendoza, is an American rapper. Born and raised in Miami, Florida he first started rapping at age fifteen.

== Biography ==
Raised in the Carol City area of Miami, Florida. Trapp Mendoza signed to local record label, Night Rider Entertainment in 1999 until 2001. He recorded a few singles while under the label, but none attracted attention. In 2001, he voided his contract and pursued his musical career on his own.

== Career ==
Trapp Mendoza produced several mix tapes, including "Killin the Industry", but made his first hard hitting appearance in the underground music circuit when he released "Bumpin" feat Posta Boy and "Hot 1" in early 2006. In March 2008, he released his self titled album, which included "Wholelottaazz", "All On You", and "Pullin" for which he gained much recognition and established a fan base in his native Miami.

He has appeared on several mix tapes including "Mic Is On" by Rosco and "I am Hood" Hosted by Gorilla Zoe. More recently Trapp Mendoza was featured on "We Get Mo" by Xplicit and producer Isaac Opus released in May 2008. It has since been played on major stations including Sirius Sat Radio, WEDR Miami 99 Jamz, Chicago radio, Underground radio & college radio. The single made a huge impact on the South Florida streets; it achieved over 170,000 plays on MySpace in just 4 weeks and was the top independent release in USA record pools for June 2008.

He was also featured on the "Hood 2 Hood: Blockumentary, Vol. 2" soundtrack released July 1, 2008. Considering the documentary's previous success, it is expected to raise a significant amount of popularity for the various artist featured on the soundtrack.

== Performances ==
A regular performer at many Miami night clubs, showcases & local events, he has performed in other states as well, at college concerts and for companies such as Esprit in New York City. In May 2004, he performed at the Miami Spring Bling '04. On July 4, 2008 he was a headliner at the Oriental Theater in Denver, Colorado alongside Devin the Dude and Bonecrusher. Trapp Mendoza is set to appear at several music venues in the summer of 2008 including Zo's Summer Groove, a fundraising event benefiting Alonzo Mourning Charities and Wade's World Foundation.

== Discography ==
=== Studio albums ===
- Trapp Mendoza & Dj Kronik

=== Mixtapes ===
- Killin The Industry

=== Guest appearances ===
Year	Song	Album
2005	"Keep my name out ya mouth" (Infa-red feat. Trapp Mendoza)	single
2008	"We Get Mo" (Xplicit feat. Trapp Mendoza)	TBD
