= Chasing Cameron =

American reality television series

- Season 1 poster
- Genre: Reality
- Created by: Brandon Ayres
- Directed by: Brandon Ayres
- Starring: Cameron Dallas
- Country of origin: United States
- Original language: English
- No. of seasons: 1
- No. of episodes: 10

Production
- Executive producers: Jane Lipsitz; Dan Cutforth; Ben Curtis; Sanford Wernick; Jon Liebman; Cameron Dallas; Bart Bordelon
- Camera setup: Multi-camera
- Running time: 30 minutes
- Production companies: Brillstein Entertainment Partners; Magical Elves

Original release
- Network: Netflix
- Release: December 27, 2016

Chasing Cameron is an American reality television series starring Vine star Cameron Dallas. It premiered on Netflix on December 27, 2016. The series centers on Cameron Dallas, a "social media influencer", who is best known for his prominence on the video app Vine. He is one of the main members of a group called Magcon (Meet and greet convention), which was short-lived in 2014, but revived, partly with other people, in 2016. During 2016, Magcon went on a tour in Europe, Australia and New Zealand, with events consisting of a show and a meet and greet.

The half-hour episodes depict Cameron and other Magcon members' road to fame, and the price that comes with Internet stardom, including a physical altercation that occurred in a European club. The show's co-starring tour members include Aaron Carpenter, Taylor Caniff and Nash Grier, as well as Dallas' immediate family members. The first season of the show consisted of ten episodes.

== Production ==
The series was announced on June 22, 2016 via Variety.

The show premiered on Netflix on December 27, 2016.

On January 20, 2017, Dallas said in a red carpet interview at the People's Choice Awards: "For sure. 100% there will be a season 2. [...] I think it's gonna dive deeper more into my relationship between my mom and sister, and then kind of a more in-depth view on where we're going and what's continuing to go on, because we're only taking steps forward, so I feel like the more we go, the more interesting it gets". Dallas also stated that the second season would feature a different premise altogether.

== Cast ==
- Cameron Dallas
- Taylor Caniff
- Aaron Carpenter
- Blake Gray
- Willie Jones
- Trey Schafer
- Joey Birlem
- Hunter Rowland
- Brandon Rowland
- Darrick Landreneau
- Mackenzie Becker

== Episodes ==
No.	Title	Original release date
1	"With One Tweet"	December 27, 2016
2	"Tyranny of the Urgent"	December 27, 2016
3	"Cam's Big Crush"	December 27, 2016
4	"Girls Like Hygiene"	December 27, 2016
5	"Caged Animal"	December 27, 2016
6	"Losing a Friend"	December 27, 2016
7	"I Don't Wanna Be Here"	December 27, 2016
8	"Second Date"	December 27, 2016
9	"No Shoes on the Bed"	December 27, 2016
10	"Fifteen Minutes"	December 27, 2016

== Reception ==
Since the release of Chasing Cameron the series has received generally negative reviews. Common Sense Media's critical consensus reads, "Internet star's self-serving reality show has iffy messages", while giving the show a rating of 1/5. Kevin O'Keeffe, writing for mic.com also criticized the show, stating "his hesitance to let go of control makes Chasing Cameron a far worse show than it could have been". Michael Andor Brodeur, writing for The Boston Globe, was somewhat more receptive, writing: "There’s something about the abundant emptiness of Chasing Cameron that, right now, feels like a necessary refuge [...] basking in its inconsequential glow."
