= Outfield (disambiguation) =

The outfield is a portion of the field of play in certain sports.

Outfield may also refer to:

- The Outfield, an English rock band
- The Outfield (film), a 2015 American sports film
- "The Outfield", a song by Good Charlotte from Youth Authority

== See also ==
- Outfielder
