= Davidson Day School =

American private school in North Carolina

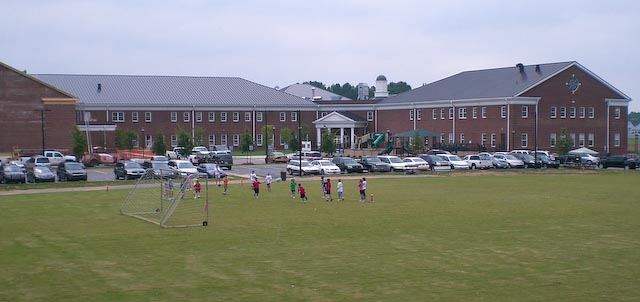

Location
- 750 Jetton St. Davidson, North Carolina 28036; United States; 35°30′11″N 80°51′41″W

Information
- Type: Private; Independent; day; college-preparatory school
- Religious affiliation: Nonsectarian
- Established: 1999 (27 years ago)
- CEEB code: 340971
- Head of school: Andrew Bishop
- Enrollment: ~550 Students
- Colors: Red, White, Navy blue
- Athletics: 35 Athletic teams
- Athletics conference: North Carolina Independent Schools Athletic Association (NCISAA)
- Team name: Patriots
- Tuition: Early childhood: $22,590; Lower school: $25,010; Middle school: $26,320; Upper school: $26,910
- Website: www.davidsonday.org

Davidson Day School is a private, college preparatory day school located in Davidson, North Carolina, United States.

== History ==
Davidson Day School, formerly Acclaim Academy, was founded in 1999 and originally located at 404 Armour Street in Davidson and rented space from the factory that occupied the building. In 2007, Davidson Day School relocated to its current location, 750 Jetton St.

== Arts ==
Every year, the Davidson Day theatre department hosts a winter and spring production.

== Athletics ==
Davidson Day School has moved from 1A to 2A given the growth in student body size. The girls varsity soccer team won the school's first team state championship in 2010–2011. After moving up to 2A for the 2011–2012 season, they won the State Championship against defending 2A Champions, Caldwell Academy, in overtime. The girls soccer team won the state championship again in the 2012–2013 season.

The varsity basketball team were state runners-up in the 2011–2012 season.

The school fielded a varsity football team for the first time in 2011–2012 and won the NC Private Division III State Championship. The football team competed in the larger Division II in the fall of 2012. They received national attention after Davidson Day junior quarterback Will Grier threw for 837 yards and 10 touchdowns 35 of 42 passes in one game on November 9, 2012, in a 104–80 victory over Harrells Christian Academy.

== Notable alumni ==
- Maya Caldwell, WNBA player
- Hayes Grier, American Internet personality
- Nash Grier, American Internet personality
- Will Grier, NFL quarterback
- C. J. Huntley, NBA player
- John Hunter Nemechek, professional stock car racing driver
