= People's Choice Award for Favorite Breakout Artist =

Annual pop culture award

- Niall Horan is the most recent recipient
- Country: United States
- Presented by: People's Choice Awards
- First award: Lady Gaga (2010)
- Final award: Niall Horan (2017)

The People's Choice Award for Favorite Breakout Artist is one of the former awards handed out at the yearly People's Choice Awards. It was first awarded in 2010 and presented to American singer Lady Gaga. After seven consecutive years (except in 2012), it was discontinued with Irish singer Niall Horan being the last recipient to hold the award in 2017.

== Winners and nominees ==
Year (Note: Each year is linked to the article about the People's Choice Awards held that year.)	Artists	Ref.
2010
2010	Lady Gaga	
2010	Adam Lambert	
2010	Demi Lovato	
2010	Kris Allen	
2010	Susan Boyle	
2011
2011	Selena Gomez & the Scene	
2011	B.o.B	
2011	Bruno Mars	
2011	Justin Bieber	
2011	Kesha	
2013
2013	The Wanted	
2013	Gotye	
2013	Fun	
2013	Carly Rae Jepsen	
2013	One Direction	
2014
2014	Ariana Grande	
2014	Austin Mahone	
2014	Icona Pop	
2014	Imagine Dragons	
2014	Lorde	
2015
2015	5 Seconds of Summer	
2015	Charli XCX	
2015	Fifth Harmony	
2015	Meghan Trainor	
2015	Sam Smith	
2016
2016	Shawn Mendes	
2016	Fetty Wap	
2016	Halsey	
2016	Tori Kelly	
2016	The Weeknd	
2017
2017	Niall Horan	
2017	Alessia Cara	
2017	The Chainsmokers	
2017	DNCE	
2017	Zayn Malik	
