= Minions (soundtrack) =

2015 soundtrack album

Minions: Original Motion Picture Soundtrack

Soundtrack album by Heitor Pereira
- Released: July 10, 2015
- Recorded: 2015
- Venue: Los Angeles, California
- Studios: Newman Scoring Stage, 20th Century Fox Studios; EastWest Studios
- Genre: Film score
- Length: 1:07:11
- Label: Back Lot Music
- Producer: Heitor Pereira

Heitor Pereira chronology
Curious George 3: Back to the Jungle (2015)	Minions: Original Motion Picture Soundtrack (2015)	The Angry Birds Movie (2016)

Minions: Original Motion Picture Soundtrack is the soundtrack album to the 2015 film Minions, a spin-off/prequel and the third installment overall in the Despicable Me franchise, directed by Pierre Coffin and Kyle Balda, the latter in his feature directorial debut. The original music is composed by Heitor Pereira who previously worked on Despicable Me (2010) and Despicable Me 2 (2013), where he composed the score with Pharrell Williams. Minions, however is the first film in the franchise, without the involvement of Williams and Pereira taking over the sole credit as the composer. The soundtrack for the film was released, alongside the film, on July 10, 2015, by Back Lot Music.

== Development ==
Pereira who watched the Despicable Me films, observed audience reaction to the Minion characters, and felt that "this is now a part of their lives, and I want to do justice to this dedication from the audience", resulting him to score for Minions. The score was fully orchestrated and dramatic to give a feel of "classic action film". As the film was mostly set during the 1960s, Pereira recorded the music using vintage microphones which were used by The Beach Boys and Frank Sinatra, which he felt as "an opportunity to pay homage to the musicians and technicians of that time" and also inspired composers such as Henry Mancini, Lalo Schifrin and John Barry. He had stated on the selection of popular songs from the 1960s, saying "Those songs represent an era but they also have to have a relationship to the moment in the movie where they appear. The directors love music and those were the songs that they felt at the moment represented the storytelling the most, like "You Really Got Me" or "My Generation". He also featured some of the songs in the film are sung by the Minions themselves. He added that "it was fun to write music around it and try to make the orchestral music and band music to somehow be holding hands with the music of the period without sounding like somebody that wrote the music then".

"I'm from Brazil, but the first time I heard The Beatles, I didn't have a clue what they were singing about. But the rhythm and the waves of the sounds that the language created somehow already put me in a certain frame of mind. I find that the same goes with the Minions' language."

— Pereira, on the use of Minions language

Pereira compared the music for the Minions to that of the Three Stooges, where the difference is Minions could not speak English. He further said that "Their language is not language, but the cumulative aspect of the repetition of those words is like creating a language in itself [...] In Minions, a lot of things go by and then the narrator has left the movie and now they are out there on their own. Instead of compensating for their lack of language I decided to back off, give them space, and let their phonetic sounds be very clear. That was a lot of fun because we almost made a dictionary of their sounds and let the music follow the same kind of repetition." Pereira took the music from their travel through time and acquired all the personalities through the score.

While the Minions had their own themes, Pereira wrote a new theme for Scarlet Overkill (Sandra Bullock), who has stated that "Scarlet is not like Lucy in Despicable Me 2. Lucy was helping. I tried to make her a little more sweet in a way. But with Scarlet, I tried to make her sound as hard as possible, powerful and mean but with a groove. She is a beautiful character and we can use her movements to accent the music. For example where she puts all the villains to a test, so that the one that captures the diamond is the one that eventually she will chose to be her helper."

The score was recorded at Los Angeles in Newman Scoring Stage, 20th Century Fox Studios and EastWest Studios. The Los Angeles Orchestra performed the score consisting of 24 violins, 12 violas, eight cellos, five basses, five saxophones, including a bass sax, five trumpets, two trombones, tuba, a choir of nearly 40-50 members, a rhythm section and a drummer. In order to create the British jazz sound resembling the music of the United Kingdom in the 1960s, Pereira invited a jazz ensemble consisted of woodwinds, clarinets, piccolos alongside drums and brass, in the same room, instead of recording each instrumentalists in separate sections. He also used percussion instruments for big cues.

== Track listing ==
All music is composed by Heitor Pereira, except where noted.

No.	Title	Writer(s)	Performer	Length
1.	"Universal Fanfare"	Jerry Goldsmith (Note: 2012 Universal Pictures fanfare composed and arranged by Brian Tyler)	The Minions (Pierre Coffin)	0:32
2.	"Happy Together"	Garry Bonner, Alan Gordon	The Turtles	2:54
3.	"I'm a Man"	Steve Winwood, Jimmy Miller	The Spencer Davis Group	3:05
4.	"You Really Got Me"	Ray Davies	The Kinks	2:14
5.	"My Generation"	Pete Townshend	The Who	3:16
6.	"Mellow Yellow"	Donovan	Donovan	3:41
7.	"Revolution (The Beatles)"	John Lennon & Paul McCartney	The Minions (Pierre Coffin)	2:22
8.	"Minions Through Time"			4:34
9.	"Kevin, Stuart and Bob"			2:57
10.	"Minions Run Amok"			1:29
11.	"Tortellini"			0:21
12.	"The VNC"			1:11
13.	"Minions in the U.S.A."			2:13
14.	"Orlando"			0:46
15.	"Scarlet Overkill"			1:07
16.	"Ruby Fight"			2:58
17.	"Make 'Em Laugh"	Nacio Herb Brown and Arthur Freed	The Minions (Pierre Coffin)	0:44
18.	"Scarlet's Fortress"			3:31
19.	"Traveling Tribe"			0:49
20.	"Tower of London"			1:39
21.	"Hair"	James Rado, Gerome Ragni	The Minions (Pierre Coffin)	0:54
22.	"Fighting the Crown Keeper"			1:43
23.	"King Bob"			0:57
24.	"Theme From The Monkees (The Monkees)"	Tommy Boyce and Bobby Hart	The Minions (Pierre Coffin)	0:29
25.	"Dungeon Mayhem"			0:35
26.	"Goodbye Fabrice"			2:28
27.	"Minion Mission"			4:56
28.	"Sneaking In"			2:34
29.	"King Kong Kevin"			3:30
30.	"Our Hero Is Back"			1:14
31.	"Minions Victory"			2:49
32.	"Greatest Renegade Unveiling (GRU)"			2:39
Total length:				67:11

== Reception ==
The music received positive critical response. Filmtracks.com wrote "don't expect to sit through a soundtrack like Minions without having already recognized some affinity for the film, because it is quite challenging to tolerate without any sense of context. Those listening to the score "cold" may find the action cues ("Minion Mission" in particular) to be of standalone interest, as the orchestra is nicely layered with the solo woodwind and vocal layers in these parts, but the rest may yield psychological unrest for the uninitiated. Although the album presentation's cues are quite short, as expected, the entire original score portion clocks in at over 45 minutes, a nice treat for fans of Pereira's wild and gregarious approach to the concept" Unger the Radar wrote "Heitor Pereira has delivered one of the best scores of the year so far and certainly one of the best animated scores of his career. With his name firmly cemented in the Remote Control family and a real gift in film scoring, he is certainly an artist and a strong name to watch because he certainly knows how to pick projects and provide some very strong music. Minions is just another notch in his belt of powerful scores."

== Chart performance ==
Chart (2013–14)	Peak position
Belgian Albums (Ultratop Flanders)	101
Belgian Albums (Ultratop Wallonia)	170
US Top Soundtracks (Billboard)	9

== Personnel ==
Credits adapted from CD liner notes:

Production

- Composer and producer – Heitor Pereira
- Conductor – Nick Glennie-Smith
- Music Coordinator – Megan Graney
- Score Engineer – Alexander Verbitskiy
- Sound Designer/Re-Recording Mixer – Chris Scarabosio
- Supervising Sound Editor – Dennis Leonard

Orchestra and Choir

- Orchestra Contractor – Peter Rotter
- Vocal Contractor – Jasper Randall
- Score Coordinator – Leah Dennis
- Scoring Crew – Denis St. Amand, Tim Lauber, Tom Steel
- Music Editor – Slamm Andrews
- Score Editor – David Channing
- Additional Recording Engineer – Moogie Canazio
- Score Technical Engineers – Alexander Verbitzkiy
- Executive-Producer – Chris Meledandri
- Legal Music Business Affairs – Kyle Staggs, Philip M. Cohen
- Executive In Charge Of Music Management – Mike Knobloch
- Marketing Manager for Back Lot Music – Nikki Walsh
- Mastered By – Reuben Cohen
- Mixed By – Gary Rizzo
- Orchestrated By – Jeremy Levy, Peter Boyer, Rick Giovinazzo, Ryan Humphrey, Susie Benchasil-Seiter
- Lead Orchestrator – Tim Davies
- Additional Programmers – Alfred Tapscott, John Jennings Boyd
- Score Recorded at – Newman Scoring Stage, Los Angeles

Musicians

- Bass – Drew Dembowski, Ed Meares, John Leftwich, Mike Valerio, Nico Abondolo, Stephen Dress
- Bassoon – Kenneth Munday, Rose Corrigan, Samantha Duckworth
- Cello – Andrew Shulman, Armen Ksajikian, Dennis Karmazyn, Eric Byers, Kim Scholes, Giovanna Clayton, Paula Hochhalter, Steve Erdody, Timothy Landauer, Trevor Handy, Vanessa Freebairn-Smith, Xiaodan Zheng
- Clarinet – Chris Bleth, Daniel Higgins, Greg Huckins, Stuart Clark
- Drums – Bernie Dresel
- Flute – Daniel Higgins, Geri Rotella, Katisse Buckingham, Steve Kujala
- Guitar – David Melton, Grant Geissman, Michael Fell
- Harmonica – Michael Fell
- Horn – Amy Rhine, Andrew Bain, Benjamin Jaber, Daniel Kelley, David Everson, Dylan Hart, Jenny Kim*, Justin Hageman, Laura Brenes, Mark Adams, Steven Becknell, Teag Reaves
- Oboe – Chris Bleth, Jessica Pearlman
- Percussion – Alex Nesciosup-Acuña, Bernie Dresel, Brian Kilgore, Donald Williams, Edward Atkatz, Joseph Pereira, MB Gordy III, Tom Walsh, Wade Culbreath
- Saxophone – Alexander Budman, Chris Bleth, Daniel Higgins, Doug Webb, Greg Huckins, Jeremy Lappitt
- Trombone – Alexander Iles, Andrew Martin, Craig Gosnell, Steven Holtman, William Reichenbach
- Trumpet – Barry Perkins, Daniel Fornero, Daniel Rosenboom, Jon Lewis, Rob Schaer, Wayne Bergeron
- Tuba – Doug Tornquist, Gary Hickman
- Viola – Alma Fernandez, Andrew Duckles, Brian Dembow, Darrin McCann, David Walther, Luke Maurer, Matthew Funes, Meredith Crawford, Robert Brophy, Shawn Mann, Victoria Miskolczy
- Violin – Akiko Tarumoto, Alyssa Park, Amy Hershberger, Ana Landauer, Andrew Bulbrook, Benjamin Jacobson, Caroline Campbell, Charlie Bisharat, Darius Campo, Ellen Jung, Eun-Mee Ahn, Grace Oh, Hana Kim, Helen Nightengale, Irina Voloshina, Jacqueline Brand, Jessica Guideri, Joel Pargman, Josefina Vergara, Julie Gigante, Kathy Sloan, Katia Popov, Kevin Connolly, Kevin Kumar, Lisa Liu, Lisa Sutton, Neil Samples, Nina Evtuhov, Phillip Levy, Rafael Rishik, Roger Wilkie, Serena McKinney, Songa Lee, Tamara Hatwan, Tereza Stanislav, Yelena Yegoryan
- Violin, Concertmaster – Bruce Dukov

Vocalists

- Sopranos – Anna Schubert, Ayana Haviv, Claire Fedoruk, Elissa Johnston, Elyse Willis, Holly Sedillos, Karen Hogle Brown, Karen Whipple Schnurr, Suzanne Waters, Zanaida Robles
- Altos – Adriana Manfredi, Amy Fogerson, Callista Hoffman-Campbell, Jennifer Haydn-Jones, Jess Rotter Murphy, Kasondra Kazanjian, Kristen Toedtman, Lesley Leighton, Michele Hemmlings, Niké St. Clair
- Basses – Abdiel Gonzalez, Alvin Chea, Dylan Gentile, Eric Bradley, James Hayden, Mark Edward Smith, Michael Geiger, Reid Bruton, Scott Graff, William Goldman
- Tenors – Arnold Livingston, Daniel J. Chaney, Fletcher Sheridan, Gerald White, Jasper Randall, Jon Lee Keenan, Matthew Tresler, Michael Lichtenauer, Shawn Kirchner, Steven Harms, Todd Strange
- Soloists – Jess Harnell, Max Uehara, Micah Angelo Luna
