= 42nd People's Choice Awards =

Pop culture award show held in 2016

- Date: January 6, 2016
- Location: Microsoft Theater, Los Angeles, California
- Hosted by: Jane Lynch

Television/radio coverage
- Network: CBS

The 42nd People's Choice Awards, honoring the best in popular culture for 2015, were held January 6, 2016, at the Microsoft Theater in Los Angeles, California, and were broadcast live on CBS. The ceremony was hosted by Jane Lynch. Nominations were announced on November 3, 2015.

== Performances ==
- Shawn Mendes — "Stitches"
- Shawn Mendes and Camila Cabello — "I Know What You Did Last Summer"
- Jason Derulo — "Get Ugly", "Want to Want Me"
- Jordan Smith, accompanied by David Foster — "You Are So Beautiful"

== Presenters ==
- Melissa Benoist
- Mayim Bialik
- Jack Black
- Betsy Brandt
- Priyanka Chopra
- Chris D'Elia
- Adam DeVine
- Vin Diesel
- Natalie Dormer
- Mike Epps
- Meagan Good
- Clark Gregg
- Colin Hanks
- Marcia Gay Harden
- Josh Holloway
- Kate Hudson
- Cheyenne Jackson
- Raza Jaffrey
- Dakota Johnson
- Taylor Kinney
- Nia Long
- Lea Michele
- Christina Milian
- Kunal Nayyar
- The Pink Ladies of Grease: Live (Julianne Hough, Vanessa Hudgens, Keke Palmer, Kether Donohue and Carly Rae Jepsen)
- Melissa Rauch
- Gina Rodriguez
- Abigail Spencer
- John Stamos
- Meghan Trainor
- Amber Valletta
- Ming-Na Wen
- Ed Westwick
- Alison Brie
- Shemar Moore

== Winners and nominees ==
The full list of nominees was announced on November 3, 2015. Winners are listed first and in boldface.

=== Movies ===
Favorite Movie	Favorite Action Movie
**Furious 7**; Avengers: Age of Ultron; Inside Out; Jurassic World; Pitch Perfect 2	**Furious 7**; Avengers: Age of Ultron; The Divergent Series: Insurgent; Jurassic World; Maze Runner: The Scorch Trials
Favorite Comedic Movie	Favorite Dramatic Movie
**Pitch Perfect 2**; The DUFF; Spy; Ted 2; Trainwreck	**The Martian**; The Age of Adaline; Fifty Shades of Grey; The Longest Ride; Straight Outta Compton
Favorite Movie Actor	Favorite Movie Actress
**Channing Tatum**; Johnny Depp; Robert Downey Jr.; Chris Pratt; Will Smith	**Sandra Bullock**; Anne Hathaway; Scarlett Johansson; Melissa McCarthy; Meryl Streep
Favorite Action Movie Actor	Favorite Action Movie Actress
**Chris Hemsworth**; Vin Diesel; Robert Downey Jr.; Dwayne Johnson; Chris Pratt	**Shailene Woodley**; Emily Blunt; Scarlett Johansson; Michelle Rodriguez; Charlize Theron
Favorite Comedic Movie Actor	Favorite Comedic Movie Actress
**Kevin Hart**; Jack Black; Robert De Niro; Will Ferrell; Mark Wahlberg	**Melissa McCarthy**; Anna Kendrick; Amy Schumer; Sofía Vergara; Rebel Wilson
Favorite Dramatic Movie Actor	Favorite Dramatic Movie Actress
**Johnny Depp**; George Clooney; Matt Damon; Will Smith; Channing Tatum	**Dakota Johnson**; Blake Lively; Jennifer Lopez; Rachel McAdams; Kate Winslet
Favorite Animated Movie Voice	Favorite Family Movie
**Selena Gomez – Hotel Transylvania 2 as Mavis**; Sandra Bullock – Minions as Scarlet Overkill; Amy Poehler – Inside Out as Joy; Rihanna – Home as Tip Tucci; Adam Sandler – Hotel Transylvania 2 as Dracula	**Minions**; Cinderella; Home; Hotel Transylvania 2; Inside Out
Favorite Thriller Movie
**Taken 3**; The Boy Next Door; Insidious: Chapter 3; Poltergeist; Unfriended

=== Television ===
Favorite TV Show	Favorite Network TV Comedy
**The Big Bang Theory**; Game of Thrones; Grey's Anatomy; The Voice; The Walking Dead	**The Big Bang Theory**; 2 Broke Girls; Mike & Molly; Modern Family; New Girl
Favorite Network TV Drama	Favorite Network TV Sci-Fi/Fantasy
**Grey's Anatomy**; Empire; Gotham; How to Get Away with Murder; Scandal	**Beauty & the Beast**; Arrow; Once Upon a Time; Supernatural; The Vampire Diaries
Favorite Cable TV Sci-Fi/Fantasy Show	Favorite TV Crime Drama
**Outlander**; American Horror Story: Hotel; Game of Thrones; Teen Wolf; The Walking Dead	**Person of Interest**; Bones; Castle; Criminal Minds; NCIS
Favorite Comedic TV Actor	Favorite Comedic TV Actress
**Jim Parsons**; Johnny Galecki; Matthew Perry; Andy Samberg; Jesse Tyler Ferguson	**Melissa McCarthy**; Kaley Cuoco; Zooey Deschanel; Anna Faris; Sofía Vergara
Favorite Dramatic TV Actor	Favorite Dramatic TV Actress
**Taylor Kinney**; Justin Chambers; Scott Foley; Terrence Howard; Jesse Williams	**Ellen Pompeo**; Viola Davis; Taraji P. Henson; Sara Ramirez; Kerry Washington
Favorite TV Crime Drama Actor	Favorite TV Crime Drama Actress
**Nathan Fillion**; Jim Caviezel; Mark Harmon; LL Cool J; Shemar Moore	**Stana Katic**; Emily Deschanel; Mariska Hargitay; Lucy Liu; Pauley Perrette
Favorite Cable TV Comedy	Favorite Cable TV Drama
**It's Always Sunny in Philadelphia**; Baby Daddy; Faking It; Real Husbands of Hollywood; Young & Hungry	**Pretty Little Liars**; Bates Motel; The Fosters; Rizzoli & Isles; Suits
Favorite Competition TV Show	Favorite Cable TV Actor
**The Voice**; America's Got Talent; American Ninja Warrior; Dancing with the Stars; MasterChef	**Kevin Hart**; Eric Dane; Adam DeVine; Taye Diggs; Christian Slater
Favorite Cable TV Actress	Favorite Premium Cable TV Show
**Sasha Alexander**; Ashley Benson; Hilary Duff; Lucy Hale; Shay Mitchell	**Homeland**; Girls; Masters of Sex; Shameless; Veep
Favorite Premium Cable TV Actor	Favorite Premium Cable TV Actress
**Dwayne Johnson**; Joshua Jackson; Nick Jonas; Matt LeBlanc; Justin Theroux	**Kristen Bell**; Claire Danes; Julia Louis-Dreyfus; Lisa Kudrow; Emmy Rossum
Favorite Sci-Fi/Fantasy TV Actor	Favorite Sci-Fi/Fantasy TV Actress
**Jensen Ackles**; Misha Collins; Sam Heughan; Ian Somerhalder; David Tennant	**Caitriona Balfe**; Emilia Clarke; Ginnifer Goodwin; Lady Gaga; Jennifer Morrison
Favorite Daytime TV Host	Favorite Daytime Talk Show Hosting Team
**Ellen DeGeneres**; Steve Harvey; Dr. Oz; Rachael Ray; Wendy Williams	**The Talk**; Good Morning America; Live! with Kelly and Michael; Today; The View
Favorite Late Night Talk Show Host	Favorite Streaming Series
**Jimmy Fallon**; Stephen Colbert; James Corden; Jimmy Kimmel; Conan O'Brien	**Orange Is the New Black**; House of Cards; The Mindy Project; Transparent; Unbreakable Kimmy Schmidt
Favorite Actor In A New TV Series	Favorite Actress In A New TV Series
**John Stamos**; Chace Crawford; Zachary Levi; Rob Lowe; Josh Peck	**Priyanka Chopra**; Jamie Lee Curtis; Marcia Gay Harden; Lea Michele; Emma Roberts
Favorite Animated TV Show	Favorite New TV Comedy
**The Simpsons**; American Dad!; Bob's Burgers; Family Guy; South Park	**Scream Queens**; Crazy Ex-Girlfriend; Grandfathered; Life in Pieces; The Muppets
Favorite New TV Drama
**Supergirl**; Blindspot; Code Black; Heroes Reborn; Quantico

=== Music ===
Favorite Male Singer	Favorite Female Singer
**Ed Sheeran**; Justin Bieber; Luke Bryan; Nick Jonas; The Weeknd	**Taylor Swift**; Lana Del Rey; Selena Gomez; Demi Lovato; Madonna
Favorite Group	Favorite Breakout Artist
**Fifth Harmony**; Fall Out Boy; Imagine Dragons; Maroon 5; One Direction	**Shawn Mendes**; Fetty Wap; Halsey; Tori Kelly; The Weeknd
Favorite Male Country Artist	Favorite Female Country Artist
**Blake Shelton**; Dierks Bentley; Luke Bryan; Brad Paisley; Keith Urban	**Carrie Underwood**; Miranda Lambert; Reba McEntire; Kacey Musgraves; Cassadee Pope
Favorite Country Group	Favorite Pop Artist
**Lady Antebellum**; The Band Perry; Florida Georgia Line; Little Big Town; Zac Brown Band	**Taylor Swift**; Kelly Clarkson; Selena Gomez; Demi Lovato; Ed Sheeran
Favorite Hip-Hop Artist	Favorite R&B Artist
**Nicki Minaj**; Big Sean; Drake; Kendrick Lamar; Wiz Khalifa	**The Weeknd**; Chris Brown; Ciara; Janet Jackson; Ne-Yo
Favorite Song	Favorite Album
**"What Do You Mean?", Justin Bieber**; "Bad Blood", Taylor Swift feat. Kendrick Lamar; "Can't Feel My Face", The Weeknd; "Love Me like You Do", Ellie Goulding; "See You Again", Wiz Khalifa feat. Charlie Puth	**Title**, **Meghan Trainor**; American Beauty/American Psycho, Fall Out Boy; Beauty Behind the Madness, The Weeknd; If You're Reading This It's Too Late, Drake; Smoke + Mirrors, Imagine Dragons
Favorite Music Icon
**Madonna**; Paul McCartney; Prince; Steven Tyler; Stevie Wonder

=== Digital ===
Favorite Social Media Celebrity	Favorite Social Media Star
**Britney Spears**; Beyoncé; Dwayne Johnson; Anna Kendrick; Taylor Swift	**Matt Bellassai**; Cameron Dallas; Frankie Grande; Nash Grier; Lele Pons
Favorite Mobile Game	Favorite Video Game
**Candy Crush Saga**; Despicable Me: Minion Rush; Fruit Ninja; Plants vs. Zombies; Temple Run	**Super Smash Bros. for Nintendo 3DS and Wii U**; Batman: Arkham Knight; Call of Duty: Advanced Warfare; Grand Theft Auto V; Minecraft
Favorite YouTube Star	The DailyMail.com Seriously Popular Award
**Connor Franta**; Grace Helbig; Jenna Marbles; Miranda Sings; Tyler Oakley	**Maddie Ziegler**; Cara Delevingne; Kylie Jenner; Bella Thorne; Ruby Rose

== Controversy ==
When The Talk won Favorite Daytime TV Hosting Team, host and creator Sara Gilbert was interrupted by 20-year-old aspiring rapper Zacari Nicasio. Nicasio grabbed the mic and said "My name is Zacari Nicasio. Shout out to Kevin Gates he has an album; Yeezy jumped over the jumpman yes sir..." Shortly after Nicasio grabbed the mic, Sharon Osbourne kicked him twice, and then Sheryl Underwood told Niciasio "You ain't gonna pull no Steve Harvey up in here [no] no sir, no sir. Security!" After Gilbert continued her speech, Aisha Tyler joked about the incident when Gilbert said they are the "Mötley Crüe of misfits" which Tyler replied "But that guy is not in our club." Osbourne added to the joke saying "Get the **** off my stage!" Osbourne also flipped off Nicasio twice as he was taken away by security during Gilbert's speech. Julie Moonves told Entertainment Tonight moments after the incident "[Osbourne] always said you mess with one of us you mess with all of us." The incident was heavily talked about on their show following the awards. After ranting about his behavior, Osbourne warned him on The Talk, "If I see him again, I'd kick him again!" Tyler told him to "practice yo speech in the bathroom dude" if he was going interrupt an award show and also mocked his speech on the show as well saying "Imma give a shout out to Spooky and them and I like cheese sandwiches." Gilbert said about being interrupted "When he first came up I just thought oh somebody's trying to steal the spotlight and it's kinda funny even though it's not right because we wanna speak to our fans and you know all of that. But there was something amusing about it. When it was unintelligible I got scared there was something wrong with him." Underwood also mentioned on The Talk that Harvey gave Underwood permission to use that joke because she had been saying it a lot and didn't want to hurt his feelings as he is a personal friend of Underwood. Underwood also stated she almost pushed Nicasio off the stage but she didn't as she feared of a lawsuit saying "When our boy was coming up to the stage I was like 'Oh hell no' and then I thought if I got on this dude and knocked him down the stairs then maybe its a lawsuit and we all get sued and network close down. For then I thought if I strong-armed the dude and kinda push him off and get him out of here."

Niciasio had no remorse over the incident but asked Osbourne to apologize and take him to dinner at The Cheesecake Factory.

On March 3, 2016, Gilbert, Underwood, and Osbourne brought up the incident again on The Talk during their conversation of a woman defending herself at gunpoint in a convenience store. Glibert said "I was thinking about [the woman defending herself] when I was watching how I would react and then I realized how I would react because we had it not a criminal situation but the guy [Niciasio] that came up during the People's Choice Awards. You two [Osbourne and Underwood] were kicking [Niciasio] off the stage and I was scared and just went quiet. You know I would just shut down and hand him the money." Osbourne joked "We were just scared that [Niciasio] was gonna sing. That would have been much scarier."

On June 13, 2016, Sara Gilbert brought up the incident again with Mike Epps who was a guest on The Talk.

Ironically, six months prior to the awards, Tyler was asked by Jason Derulo at the 2015 Ubisoft E3 press conference to dance with him after Tyler remarked that she was glad to not dance up there with him as she pointed out she is not a good dancer. Derulo jokingly was disappointed that Tyler didn't crash his performance.
