= Will Grier =

American football player (born 1995)

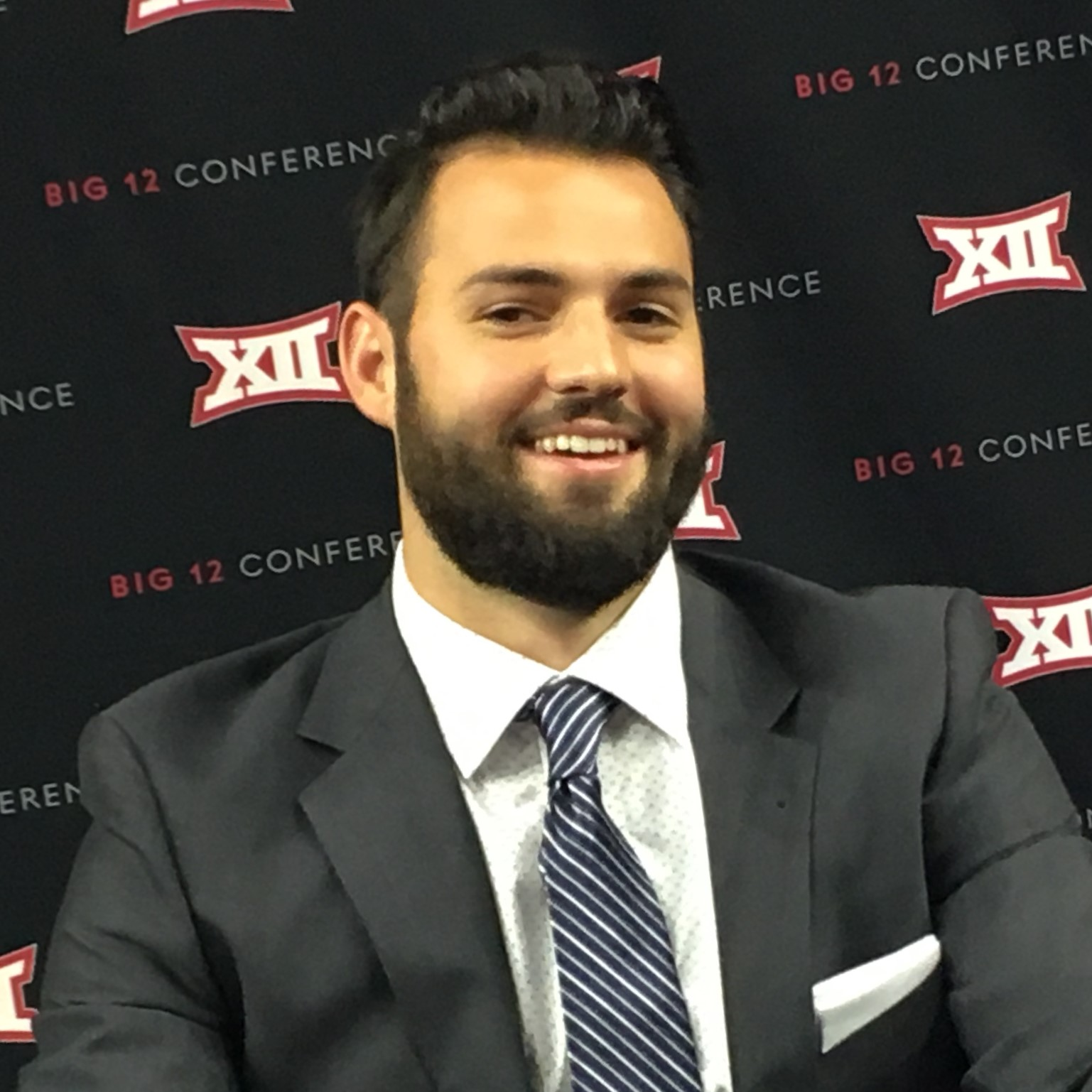
- Grier in 2018

Dallas Cowboys
- Title: Offensive assistant

Personal information
- Born: April 3, 1995 (age 31); Davidson, North Carolina, U.S.
- Listed height: 6 ft 1 in (1.85 m)
- Listed weight: 220 lb (100 kg)

Career information
- Position: Quarterback (No. 3, 14, 16)
- High school: Davidson Day School
- College: Florida (2014–2015); West Virginia (2016–2018)
- NFL draft: 2019: 3rd round, 100th overall pick

Career history

Playing
- Carolina Panthers (2019–2020); Dallas Cowboys (2021–2022); Cincinnati Bengals (2023)*; New England Patriots (2023); Los Angeles Chargers (2023); Philadelphia Eagles (2024)*; Dallas Cowboys (2024–2025); Carolina Panthers (2026)*
- * Offseason or practice squad member only

Coaching
- Dallas Cowboys (2026–present) Offensive assistant

Awards and highlights
- Big 12 Offensive Newcomer of the Year (2017); Second-team All-Big 12 (2018)

Career NFL statistics
- Passing attempts: 52
- Passing completions: 28
- Completion percentage: 53.8%
- TD–INT: 0–4
- Passing yards: 228
- Passer rating: 33.2
- Stats at Pro Football Reference

William Grier (born April 3, 1995) is an American former professional football quarterback, and current offensive assistant for the Dallas Cowboys of the National Football League (NFL). He played college football for the Florida Gators and West Virginia Mountaineers, and was selected by the Carolina Panthers in the third round of the 2019 NFL draft.

== Early life ==
Grier attended SouthLake Christian Academy in Huntersville, North Carolina, then transferred to Davidson Day School in Davidson, North Carolina. As a junior, he threw for a national record 837 yards in a game, breaking the old record of 764. As a senior, he had 4,989 passing yards with a nation-leading and North Carolina record 77 touchdowns. He also rushed for 1,251 yards with 13 touchdowns. He was named the Parade All-American Player of the Year and Mr. Football USA. For his career, Grier had 14,565 passing yards, a state record 195 touchdown passes, 2,955 rushing yards and 31 rushing touchdowns.

Grier was rated by Rivals.com as a four-star recruit and was ranked as the second best dual-threat quarterback in his class and 46th player overall. Grier was offered scholarships to play football at Auburn, Arkansas, Florida, North Carolina, Tennessee, and Wake Forest. He committed to play quarterback at the University of Florida.

== College career ==
=== Florida ===
Grier competed with Treon Harris to be Jeff Driskel's backup as a freshman in 2014, ultimately redshirting the season. As a redshirt freshman in 2015, he competed with Harris to be the starting quarterback. Although Harris started the first game of the season against New Mexico State, Grier received playing time, attempting 18 passes and completing 16 for 166 yards with two touchdowns. He rushed for 43 yards with a touchdown. Grier started the second game, against East Carolina, throwing for 151 yards, two touchdowns and an interception. On October 3, against the Ole Miss Rebels, he had the best game of his young career, going 24-of-29 for 271 yards and four passing touchdowns. He threw his four touchdowns in the first half; he was the first Gator quarterback since Chris Leak in 2005 to accomplish the feat. The game ended up being a 38–10 win for the Gators.

Grier received a one-year suspension, effective October 12, 2015, after it was revealed that he had tested positive for performance-enhancing drugs. He said the positive test stems from the drug Ligandrol, and that he was not aware it was banned, while also admitting he never followed protocol to clear the supplement with team trainers. His appeal was rejected by the NCAA, and he would not be eligible to return until the sixth game of the regular season in 2016. On December 19, 2015, Florida announced that Grier planned to transfer to another school.

=== West Virginia ===
On April 6, 2016, Grier announced that he was transferring to West Virginia University. He sat out the 2016 season per NCAA transfer rules. Grier was the presumed starter for West Virginia heading into the 2017 season, but there were questions surrounding his eligibility, since half of his year-long suspension was served in conjunction with his transfer waiting period. On June 20, 2017, West Virginia head coach Dana Holgerson announced that the NCAA had granted Grier a waiver and he would be eligible to play in the season opener against Virginia Tech. In his first game with the Mountaineers, Grier threw for 371 yards, three touchdowns and an interception in a 31–24 loss to Virginia Tech. Grier threw for 352 yards and five touchdowns in a come-from-behind victory over then-No. 24 Texas Tech on October 14, and was named Big 12 Offensive Player of the Week. In the Mountaineers’ 11th game of the season, against Texas, Grier left the game in the second quarter with a broken finger on his throwing hand. Grier had surgery on the broken finger and missed the remainder of the season, finishing with 3,490 passing yards and 36 total touchdowns on the year. At the conclusion of the season, Grier was awarded as Big 12 Offensive Newcomer of the Year.

On December 14, 2017, Grier announced he would be returning for his senior season rather than entering the 2018 NFL draft. He was listed on preseason watch lists for several national awards, including the Maxwell Award, Walter Camp Award, and Davey O'Brien Award. Grier appeared in several preseason lists of potential Heisman Trophy candidates. At the 2018 Big 12 Media Days, he was announced as the conference's Preseason Offensive Player of the Year and a preseason first-team all-conference selection.

Grier finished the 2018 season with 3,864 passing yards, 37 touchdowns, and eight interceptions. He was named second-team All-Big 12 at the conclusion of the regular season. West Virginia finished with an 8–3 regular season record and was invited to the Camping World Bowl; Grier announced that he would not play in the bowl game, in order to prepare for the 2019 NFL draft. Grier would be named the winner of the 2018 Senior CLASS Award for FBS football as the outstanding senior student-athlete in that grouping of schools.

== Professional career ==
Pre-draft measurables
Height	Weight	Arm length	Hand span	Wingspan	40-yard dash	10-yard split	20-yard split	20-yard shuttle	Three-cone drill	Vertical jump	Broad jump	Wonderlic
6 ft 2 1/2 in (1.89 m)	217 lb (98 kg)	31 1/2 in (0.80 m)	9 3/8 in (0.24 m)	6 ft 3 1/8 in (1.91 m)	4.84 s	1.68 s	2.81 s	4.28 s	7.09 s	34.0 in (0.86 m)	9 ft 4 in (2.84 m)	30
All values from NFL Combine

=== Carolina Panthers (first stint) ===
Grier was selected by the Carolina Panthers in the third round (100th overall) in the 2019 NFL draft.

In 2019, he was the third-string quarterback behind Cam Newton and Kyle Allen. On December 16, it was announced that Grier would be making his first career start in week 16 against the Indianapolis Colts. During the game, Grier threw for 224 yards, three interceptions and rushed for 17 yards in the 38–6 loss. In Week 17 season finale against the New Orleans Saints, Grier threw for four yards and a pick-six before exiting the game due to a foot injury in the second quarter. The Panthers lost the game 42–10.

In 2020, new head coach Matt Rhule signed free agent Teddy Bridgewater to be the starter at quarterback. Grier was named the third-string quarterback after being passed on the depth chart by P. J. Walker. He did not play in any games and was declared inactive for 9 of the final 11 contests.

In 2021, the team traded for Sam Darnold to be the starter at quarterback. On August 31, Grier was released after the Panthers decided to keep only two quarterbacks on the roster.

=== Dallas Cowboys (first stint) ===
On September 1, 2021, Grier was claimed off waivers by the Dallas Cowboys, to replace Ben DiNucci as the third-string quarterback behind Dak Prescott and Cooper Rush. He was declared inactive for 16 contests. He was activated for the season finale but did not play.

On August 30, 2022, Grier was waived by the Cowboys and signed to the practice squad the next day. He was elevated to the roster in three games, before being promoted to the active roster on October 5, to provide depth while Prescott recovered from a right thumb injury he suffered in the season opener. He served as the backup to Rush for five games, but did not see any game action and was declared inactive for the final 11 weeks.

On August 26, 2023, the Cowboys acquired Trey Lance to be the team's third-string quarterback. Grier was notified the same day that he would be part of the last cuts, but that he would be given the chance to play the complete preseason game against the Las Vegas Raiders, where he posted 305 passing yards, 2 passing touchdowns and 2 rushing touchdowns. On August 29, Grier was waived.

=== Cincinnati Bengals ===
On August 30, 2023, Grier signed with the practice squad of the Cincinnati Bengals.

=== New England Patriots ===
On September 22, 2023, Grier was signed by the New England Patriots off the Bengals practice squad. He was waived on November 25, and re-signed three days later to the practice squad.

=== Los Angeles Chargers ===
On December 18, 2023, Grier was signed by the Los Angeles Chargers off the Patriots practice squad. He was acquired to be the backup behind Easton Stick, who took over the quarterback starting job after Justin Herbert was placed on injured reserve with a broken finger.

=== Philadelphia Eagles ===
On March 23, 2024, Grier signed a one-year contract with the Philadelphia Eagles. He reunited with offensive coordinator Kellen Moore, who had also been the offensive coordinator when Grier played for the Cowboys. He was released on August 26 and signed to the practice squad two days later. Grier was released again on November 7.

=== Dallas Cowboys (second stint) ===
On November 12, 2024, Grier was signed to the Dallas Cowboys' practice squad. He was promoted to the active roster on January 4, 2025.

On August 26, 2025, Grier was released by the Cowboys as part of final roster cuts and was re-signed to the practice squad the next day. On February 2, 2026, he signed a reserve/futures contract with Dallas. Grier was released by the Cowboys on March 12.

=== Carolina Panthers (second stint) ===
On April 21, 2026, the Carolina Panthers brought back Grier, signing him as a free agent. Grier announced his retirement from professional football on July 15.

== Coaching career ==
On July 24, 2026, the Dallas Cowboys hired Grier to serve as an offensive assistant under head coach Brian Schottenheimer.

== Career statistics ==
Legend
**Bold**	Career high

=== NFL ===
Year	Team	Games			Passing								Rushing				Sacks		Fumbles	
Year	Team	GP	GS	Record	Cmp	Att	Pct	Yds	Avg	TD	Int	Rtg	Att	Yds	Avg	TD	Sck	SckY	Fum	Lost
2019	CAR	2	2	0–2	28	52	53.8	228	4.4	0	4	33.2	7	22	3.1	0	6	44	1	1
2020	CAR	0	0	—	DNP															
2021	DAL	0	0	—	DNP															
2022	DAL	0	0	—	DNP															
2023	NE	0	0	—	DNP															
2023	LAC	0	0	—	DNP															
2024	DAL	0	0	—	DNP															
Total		2	2	0–2	28	52	53.8	228	4.4	0	4	33.2	7	22	3.1	0	6	44	1	1

=== College ===
Season	Team	GP	Passing							Rushing			
Season	Team	GP	Cmp	Att	Pct	Yds	TD	Int	Rtg	Att	Yds	Avg	TD
2015	Florida	6	105	160	65.5	1,202	10	3	145.6	36	116	**3.2**	2
2017	West Virginia	11	250	388	64.4	3,490	34	**12**	162.7	**63**	**122**	1.9	2
2018	West Virginia	11	**266**	**397**	**67.0**	**3,864**	**37**	8	**175.5**	48	90	2.9	**3**
Career		28	621	945	65.7	8,556	81	23	165.2	147	328	2.2	7

== Personal life ==
Grier is from Charlotte, North Carolina and is the oldest child of Chad Grier and Elizabeth Grier-Floyd. His father is a football coach and was a former quarterback for the East Carolina Pirates. He has two brothers, Nash and Hayes, a half-sister, Skylynn Elizabeth Floyd and a half-brother, John Henry "Hank" Grier. Nash, Hayes and Skylynn were popular users of Vine, the defunct video sharing service. Grier is married to Jeanne Marie O'Neil and they have two daughters.
