= DigiTour Media =

Touring and festival production company

DigiTour
- Genre: Pop, rock, alternative rock, hip hop
- Locations: United States, Canada, United Kingdom
- Years active: 2010–2018
- Founders: Meridith Valiando Rojas, Christopher Rojas
- Attendance: 2011: 3,500; 2012: 6,000; 2013: 18,000; 2014: 110,000; 2015: 300,000

DigiTour Media was a touring and social media festival production company, known for producing the world's first social media tour. DigiTour events were held in venues such as theaters, amphitheaters, and parking lots or fields upon which the stages and other structures were erected. The tour began as a showcase for social media stars from YouTube, but its roster of performers expanded to include Vine, Twitter, and Instagram stars as well as traditional pop music stars.

== Overview ==
DigiTour Media would produce live events and unique content that featured some of the most popular acts on YouTube. DigiFest NYC, a full-day festival property formerly owned by DigiTour, was typically held on the first Saturday of June in New York City. Many of the acts at DigiTour events would not get their music played on the radio, yet they would continually sell out DigiTour's multiple events with their tens of millions of fans.

DigiTour successfully secured multiple brand sponsorships from companies such as Intel, Google, Sony, and Gibson. On May 15, 2014, the company announced strategic investments from Ryan Seacrest and Advance Publications, parent company of Conde Nast.

The company has been seemingly dormant since about 2018, with no announcement for any tours or events in the time since.

== History ==
DigiTour Media was founded in 2010 by music executive Meridith Valiando Rojas and multi-platinum music producer Christopher Rojas. DigiTour has produced over 70 events as of 2013, including all-day festivals, which feature 40–80 artists, as well as month-long tours.

The first DigiTour took place in 2011 and was sponsored by YouTube. The 27-city tour began with a multi-camera livestream at the Google Headquarters in Mountainview, California, on April 8, 2011. Top musician Britney Spears attended the opening night of the tour at the El Rey Theater.

The second DigiTour took place in 2012 and traveled to 18 cities including Los Angeles, Las Vegas, Orlando, Toronto, and New York City.

The first DigiFest took place on June 1, 2013, at Terminal 5 in New York City and was headlined by Pentatonix and Allstar Weekend. DigiTour 2013 showcased the most popular British YouTube personalities. Over 11,000 fans attended shows in Chicago, Toronto, Philadelphia, and New York.

DigiFest LA took place on December 14, 2013, and was dubbed the largest YouTube music festival by Just Jared. The event featured over 50 performances and was headlined by rapper Hoodie Allen. Teen actors Bella Thorne, Madison Pettis, Blake Michael, and Jake Short also made on-stage appearances, with James Maslow of Big Time Rush and Darren Criss of Glee in attendance.

Nearly 100,000 fans attended DigiTour events in the United States, Canada, and Europe in 2014. The company and Disney Music Group formed in June 2017 RMI Recordings, a new label for "digital-first" talent.

== Notable performers ==
Notable DigiTour and DigiFest entertainers include:

- Christina Grimmie
- Aaron Carpenter
- Blake Michael
- Jasmine Villegas
- Midnight Red
- Before You Exit
- Megan and Liz
- Action Item
- Jake Short
- Marcus Butler
- Twaimz
- Nash Grier
- Andrea Russett
- Kaleb Nation
- Lohanthony
- Jennxpenn
- Jackson Guthy
- Poppy
- Crawford Collins
- Weekly Chris
- Tanya Burr
- Caspar Lee
- Jim Chapman
- PointlessBlog
- Pentatonix
- GloZell
- Tyler Ward
- Improv Everywhere
- Allstar Weekend
- Keenan Cahill
- Steve Kardynal
- Kina Grannis
- Savannah Outen
- The Gregory Brothers
- Dave Days
- Rebecca Black
- Antoine Dodson
- Nick Pitera
- Joey Graceffa
- Fifth Harmony
- Troye Sivan
- Hoodie Allen
- Jacob Sartorius
- Tyler Oakley
- Forever in Your Mind
- Reed Deming
- Chase Goehring
- Madliyn Bailey
- Jacob Whitesides
- Heffron Drive
- Brent Rivera
- Ryan Beatty
- Cody Johns
- The Janoskians
- Lia Marie Johnson
- Elijah Daniel
- Jacksfilms
- Al Calderon
- Jack & Jack
- Oli White
- Bea Miller
- Thatsojack
- Cimorelli
- Karmin
- Madison Pettis
- Cameron Dallas
- Loren Gray
- Nathan Triska
- Sophia Kameron
- Luna Blaise
- Raegan Beast
- Jonah Marais
