= Oriental Theater (Denver) =

Movie theater in Denver, Colorado, United States

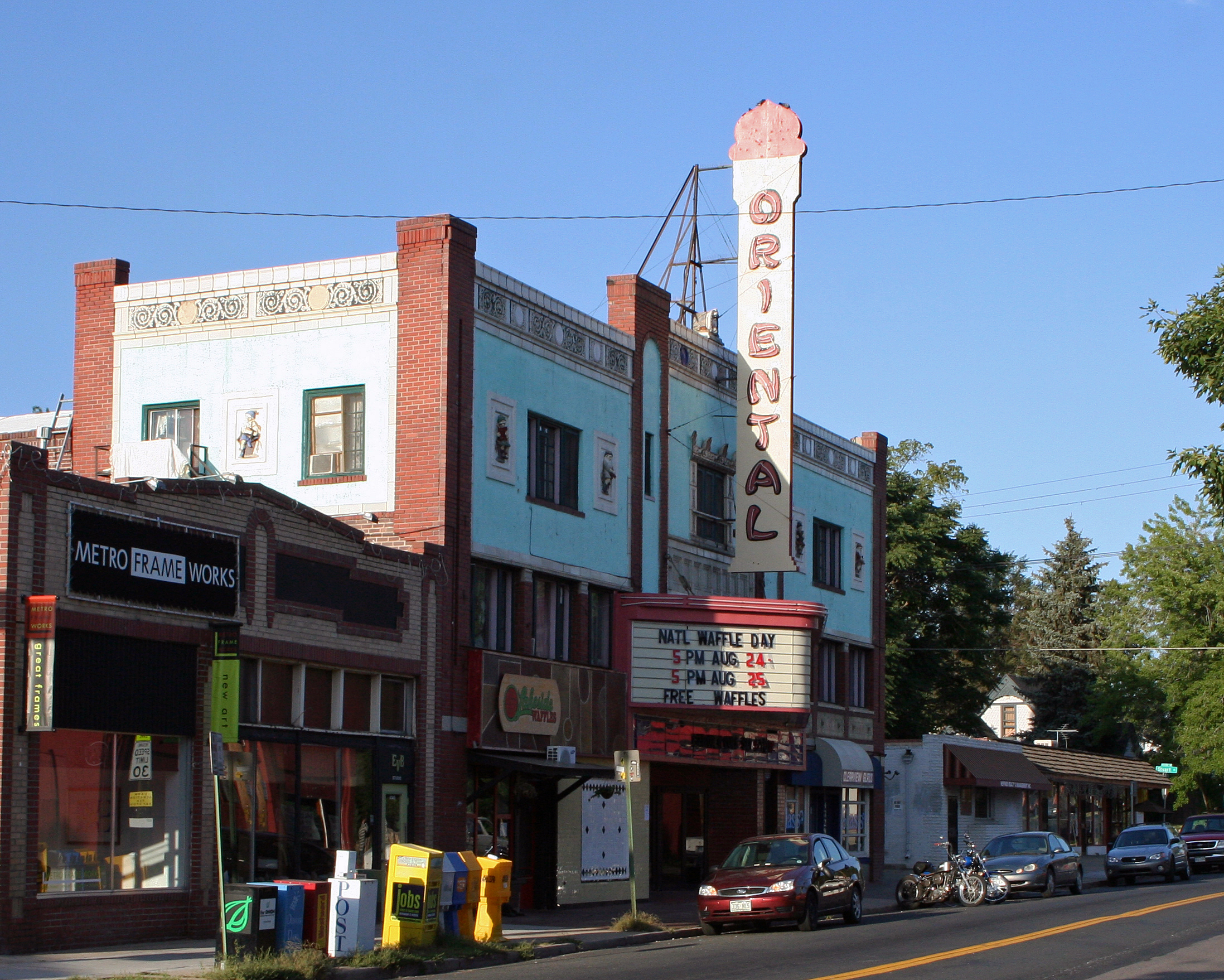
- Exterior view of venue from Tennyson St. (c.2009)
- Interactive map of Oriental Theater
- Address: 4335 W 44th Ave; Denver, CO 80212-2302
- Location: Tennyson Art and Business District
- Owner: Scott La Barbera, Andrew Bercaw
- Capacity: 707 (general admission); 575 (seated/reserved)

Construction
- Groundbreaking: July 8, 1927
- Opened: December 24, 1927
- Renovated: 1994, 2005, 2011, 2016
- Cost: $200,000 ($3.71 million in 2025 dollars)
- Architect: Leo Andrew Desjardins

Website
- Venue Website
- Oriental Theater
- U.S. National Register of Historic Places
- Architectural style: Exotic Revival
- NRHP reference No.: 97001167
- Added to NRHP: September 26, 1997

The Oriental Theater is a historic theater is located in Berkeley neighborhood of Denver, Colorado. Since opening in 1927, the venue has hosted numerous functions both private and public. The venue allows minors and consumers over 21 to function together, rather than having to be separated by their ages. It is currently used as a live music venue and is registered with the National Register of Historic Places.

== History ==
The Oriental Theater was built in 1927 and originally started off showcasing movie films. In 1960, the owners decided to put in new seats and carpet to attract customers but due to the lack of response the theater had to close.

After 45 years of inactivity, it was purchased by Scott Labarbera, in 2005, and turned into a live music venue. Labarbera was owner from 2005 and sold to Jim Norris and 3 Kings Tavern Entertainment in 2009. In 2011, Scott Labarbera, Andy Bercaw and Lara Moore bought back the theater but the opening was shortly lived. They were forced to shut down for renovation to the building due to part of the structure almost falling on concert goers during an event. In 2012, after the much needed fixes and help of investors, the venue was re-opened. Presently the theater host's some of Denver's largest events with local and national acts and has the same owner.

== Performers ==
- The AAA Girls
- Aaron Carter
- Bill Frisell
- Leon Russell
- Doug Kershaw
- Marty Stuart
- Todd Rundgren
- Sage Francis
- Jesse Dayton
- Todd Snider
- Colton Dixon
- My Life with the Thrill Kill Kult
- Hot Tuna
- Tommy Castro
- Carnage the Executioner
- Matt Bellassai
- Stryker & MFT
- 10 Years
