= 43rd People's Choice Awards =

Pop culture award show held in 2017

- Date: January 18, 2017
- Location: Microsoft Theater, Los Angeles, California
- Hosted by: Joel McHale

Highlights
- Most wins: Britney Spears (4)
- Most nominations: Captain America: Civil War (7)

Television/radio coverage
- Network: CBS

The 43rd People's Choice Awards, honoring the best in popular culture for 2016, were held on January 18, 2017, at the Microsoft Theater in Los Angeles, California, and were broadcast live on CBS. The ceremony was hosted by Joel McHale.

On November 15, 2016, the nominees were announced. The movie Captain America: Civil War received the most nominations of the year with seven. The TV series Grey's Anatomy and actor Kevin Hart each received five nominations and singer, Britney Spears and Zootopia received four nominations. The biggest winner of the evening was Spears, who won a total of four awards, and Ellen DeGeneres, who won three and became the most awarded person in the show's history.

== Performers ==
- Fifth Harmony – "Work from Home"
- Blake Shelton – "Every Time I Hear That Song"

== Nominees ==
The full list of nominees was announced on November 15, 2016.

=== Movies ===
Favorite Movie	Favorite Action Movie
Finding Dory; Captain America: Civil War; Deadpool; Suicide Squad; Zootopia	Deadpool; Batman v Superman: Dawn of Justice; Captain America: Civil War; Suicide Squad; X-Men: Apocalypse
Favorite Comedic Movie	Favorite Dramatic Movie
Bad Moms; Central Intelligence; Ghostbusters; How to Be Single; Neighbors 2: Sorority Rising	Me Before You; Deepwater Horizon; Miracles from Heaven; Miss Peregrine's Home for Peculiar Children; Sully
Favorite Movie Actor	Favorite Movie Actress
Ryan Reynolds; Robert Downey Jr.; Tom Hanks; Kevin Hart; Will Smith	Jennifer Lawrence; Scarlett Johansson; Anna Kendrick; Melissa McCarthy; Margot Robbie
Favorite Action Movie Actor	Favorite Action Movie Actress
Robert Downey Jr.; Chris Evans; Liam Hemsworth; Ryan Reynolds; Will Smith	Margot Robbie; Scarlett Johansson; Jennifer Lawrence; Zoe Saldaña; Shailene Woodley
Favorite Comedic Movie Actor	Favorite Comedic Movie Actress
Kevin Hart; Zac Efron; Ryan Gosling; Chris Hemsworth; Dwayne Johnson	Melissa McCarthy; Kristen Bell; Anna Kendrick; Kristen Wiig; Rebel Wilson
Favorite Dramatic Movie Actor	Favorite Dramatic Movie Actress
Tom Hanks; Ben Affleck; George Clooney; Chris Pine; Mark Wahlberg	Blake Lively; Amy Adams; Emily Blunt; Julia Roberts; Meryl Streep
Favorite Animated Movie Voice	Favorite Family Movie
Ellen DeGeneres – Finding Dory as Dory; Jason Bateman – Zootopia as Nick Wilde; Ginnifer Goodwin – Zootopia as Judy Hopps; Kevin Hart – The Secret Life of Pets as Snowball; Bill Murray – The Jungle Book as Baloo	Finding Dory; Alice Through the Looking Glass; The Jungle Book; The Secret Life of Pets; Zootopia
Favorite Thriller Movie	Favorite Movie Icon
The Girl on the Train; The Conjuring 2; Nerve; The Purge: Election Year; The Shallows	Johnny Depp; Tom Cruise; Tom Hanks; Samuel L. Jackson; Denzel Washington
Favorite Year-End Blockbuster
Fantastic Beasts and Where to Find Them; Doctor Strange; Moana; Rogue One: A Star Wars Story; Sing

=== Television ===
Favorite TV Show	Favorite Network TV Comedy
Outlander; The Big Bang Theory; Grey's Anatomy; Stranger Things; The Walking Dead	The Big Bang Theory; Black-ish; Jane the Virgin; Modern Family; New Girl
Favorite Network TV Drama	Favorite Network TV Sci-Fi/Fantasy
Grey's Anatomy; Chicago Fire; Empire; How to Get Away with Murder; Quantico	Supernatural; Arrow; The Flash; Once Upon a Time; The Vampire Diaries
Favorite Cable TV Sci-Fi/Fantasy Show	Favorite TV Crime Drama
The Walking Dead; American Horror Story: Roanoke; Orphan Black; Shadowhunters; Teen Wolf	Criminal Minds; The Blacklist; Law & Order: Special Victims Unit; Lucifer; NCIS
Favorite Comedic TV Actor	Favorite Comedic TV Actress
Jim Parsons; Tim Allen; Anthony Anderson; Matthew Perry; Andy Samberg	Sofía Vergara; Kaley Cuoco; Zooey Deschanel; Anna Faris; Gina Rodriguez
Favorite Dramatic TV Actor	Favorite Dramatic TV Actress
Justin Chambers; Scott Foley; Terrence Howard; Taylor Kinney; Jesse Williams	Priyanka Chopra; Viola Davis; Taraji P. Henson; Ellen Pompeo; Kerry Washington
Favorite TV Crime Drama Actor	Favorite TV Crime Drama Actress
Mark Harmon; LL Cool J; Chris O'Donnell; Tom Selleck; Donnie Wahlberg	Jennifer Lopez; Sophia Bush; Mariska Hargitay; Lucy Liu; Pauley Perrette
Favorite Cable TV Comedy	Favorite Cable TV Drama
Baby Daddy; Atlanta; It's Always Sunny in Philadelphia; Real Husbands of Hollywood; Younger	Bates Motel; The Americans; Mr. Robot; Pretty Little Liars; Queen Sugar
Favorite Cable TV Actor	Favorite Cable TV Actress
Freddie Highmore; Adam DeVine; Zach Galifianakis; Kevin Hart; Rami Malek	Vera Farmiga; Ashley Benson; Hilary Duff; Lucy Hale; Keri Russell
Favorite Premium Drama Series	Favorite Premium Comedy Series
Orange Is the New Black; Homeland; House of Cards; Narcos; Power	Fuller House; The Mindy Project; Shameless; Unbreakable Kimmy Schmidt; Veep
Favorite Premium Sci-Fi/Fantasy Series	Favorite Premium Series Actor
Outlander; Game of Thrones; Luke Cage; Stranger Things; Westworld	Dwayne Johnson; Aziz Ansari; Joshua Jackson; Nick Jonas; Kevin Spacey
Favorite Premium Series Actress	Favorite Sci-Fi/Fantasy TV Actor
Sarah Jessica Parker; Claire Danes; Jane Fonda; Julia Louis-Dreyfus; Taylor Schilling	Sam Heughan; Jensen Ackles; Andrew Lincoln; Tyler Posey; Ian Somerhalder
Favorite Sci-Fi/Fantasy TV Actress	Favorite Competition TV Show
Caitriona Balfe; Millie Bobby Brown; Emilia Clarke; Lauren Cohan; Jennifer Morrison	The Voice; America's Got Talent; American Ninja Warrior; Dancing with the Stars; MasterChef
Favorite Daytime TV Host	Favorite Daytime Talk Show Hosting Team
Ellen DeGeneres; Dr. Phil; Steve Harvey; Rachael Ray; Kelly Ripa	Good Morning America; The Chew; The Talk; Today; The View
Favorite Late Night Talk Show Host	Favorite Actor In A New TV Series
Jimmy Fallon; Stephen Colbert; James Corden; Jimmy Kimmel; Conan O'Brien	Matt LeBlanc; Kevin James; Kiefer Sutherland; Milo Ventimiglia; Damon Wayans
Favorite Actress In A New TV Series	Favorite Animated TV Show
Kristen Bell; Jordana Brewster; Minnie Driver; Mandy Moore; Piper Perabo	The Simpsons; American Dad!; Bob's Burgers; Family Guy; South Park
Favorite New TV Comedy	Favorite New TV Drama
Man with a Plan; American Housewife; The Good Place; The Great Indoors; Kevin Can Wait	This Is Us; Bull; Designated Survivor; The Exorcist; Timeless

=== Music ===
Favorite Male Artist	Favorite Female Artist
Justin Timberlake; Drake; Shawn Mendes; Blake Shelton; The Weeknd	Britney Spears; Adele; Beyoncé; Ariana Grande; Rihanna
Favorite Group	Favorite Breakout Artist
Fifth Harmony; The Chainsmokers; Coldplay; Panic! at the Disco; Twenty One Pilots	Niall Horan; Alessia Cara; The Chainsmokers; DNCE; Zayn
Favorite Male Country Artist	Favorite Female Country Artist
Blake Shelton; Luke Bryan; Sam Hunt; Tim McGraw; Keith Urban	Carrie Underwood; Kelsea Ballerini; Miranda Lambert; Reba McEntire; Dolly Parton
Favorite Country Group	Favorite Pop Artist
Little Big Town; The Band Perry; Florida Georgia Line; Lonestar; Zac Brown Band	Britney Spears; Adele; Ariana Grande; Sia; Justin Timberlake
Favorite Hip-Hop Artist	Favorite R&B Artist
G-Eazy; DJ Khaled; Kendrick Lamar; Kanye West; Wiz Khalifa	Rihanna; Beyoncé; Drake; Usher; The Weeknd
Favorite Song	Favorite Album
"Can't Stop the Feeling!" by Justin Timberlake; "No" by Meghan Trainor; "One Dance" by Drake feat. Kyla and Wizkid; "Pillowtalk" by Zayn; "Work" by Rihanna feat. Drake	If I'm Honest – Blake Shelton; Anti – Rihanna; Dangerous Woman – Ariana Grande; Lemonade – Beyoncé; Views – Drake

=== Digital ===
Favorite Social Media Celebrity	Favorite Social Media Star
Britney Spears; Stephen Amell; Kim Kardashian; Lady Gaga; Shakira	Cameron Dallas; Baby Ariel; Nash Grier; Liza Koshy; Jacob Sartorius
Favorite YouTube Star	Favorite Comedic Collaboration
Lilly Singh; Shane Dawson; Miranda Sings; Tyler Oakley; PewDiePie	Ellen DeGeneres and Britney Spears Mall Mischief; James Corden's Carpool Karaoke with Adele; Lip Sync Battle with Channing Tatum and Jenna Dewan Tatum; Conan O'Brien's Ride Along with Ice Cube and Kevin Hart; Saturday Night Live with Alec Baldwin and Kate McKinnon
CBS.com's Favorite Digital Obsession	Favorite Video Game
Mannequin Challenge; 360° & VR; Facebook Live; Pokémon Go; Snapchat Lenses	Uncharted 4: A Thief's End; Overwatch; Titanfall 2; Watch Dogs 2; Dishonored 2
