= The Angry Birds Movie (soundtrack) =

2016 soundtrack albums

Two soundtracks were released for The Angry Birds Movie, a 2016 animated comedy film based on the Rovio Entertainment's Angry Birds franchise: an original soundtrack and an original score. The first album featured music ranging from various genres and artists such as Blake Shelton, Demi Lovato, Imagine Dragons, Charli XCX (who voiced Willow in the film), Peter Dinklage amongst several others, and released on May 6, 2016. The second album featured score composed by Heitor Pereira and released the following week. Both albums were distributed by Atlantic Records.

== The Angry Birds Movie (Original Motion Picture Soundtrack) ==
The Angry Birds Movie (Original Motion Picture Soundtrack)

Soundtrack album by Various artists
- Released: May 6, 2016
- Recorded: 2015–16
- Genres: Pop; rock; country; hip hop; electronic
- Length: 48:43
- Label: Atlantic

Singles from The Angry Birds Movie (Original Motion Picture Soundtrack)
- 1. "I Will Survive (Demi Lovato cover)" Released: May 5, 2016

The film's soundtrack, titled The Angry Birds Movie (Original Motion Picture Soundtrack), was released on May 6, 2016. Demi Lovato covered the 1978 single "I Will Survive" performed by Gloria Gaynor. The song was later released as a single on May 5, 2016, ahead of the film's soundtrack release. In April 2016, producer John Cohen announced that Charli XCX who voiced Willow in the film, would also contribute the song "Explode".

=== Reception ===
Sage Young of Bustle wrote "The Angry Birds Movie soundtrack is a weird, wonderful collection of guilty pleasures that will entertain kids and adults".

=== Track listing ===
The Angry Birds Movie (Original Motion Picture Soundtrack) track listing
No.	Title	Performed by	Length
1.	"Friends"	Blake Shelton	3:04
2.	"I Will Survive"	Demi Lovato	4:05
3.	"Wonderful Life (Mi Oh My)"	Matoma	3:30
4.	"On Top of the World"	Imagine Dragons	3:12
5.	"Explode"	Charli XCX	3:45
6.	"Never Gonna Give You Up"	Rick Astley	3:34
7.	"Rock You Like a Hurricane"	Scorpions	4:16
8.	"Fight"	Steve Aoki	3:52
9.	"Wild Thing"	Tone Lōc	4:25
10.	"Sound of da Police"	KRS-One	4:18
11.	"Behind Blue Eyes"	Limp Bizkit	4:31
12.	"The Mighty Eagle Song"	Peter Dinklage	2:06
13.	"The Mighty Red Song"	The Hatchlings and the Blues	0:47
14.	"The Angry Birds Movie Score Medley"	Heitor Pereira	3:18

=== Charts ===
Chart (2016)	Peak position
UK Soundtrack Albums (OCC)	48

=== Accolades ===
Award	Date	Category	Recipient(s)	Result	Ref(s).
Teen Choice Awards	July 31, 2016	Choice Music: Song from a Movie or TV Show	"I Will Survive" by Demi Lovato	Nominated	

== The Angry Birds Movie (Original Motion Picture Score) ==
The Angry Birds Movie (Original Motion Picture Score)

Film score by Heitor Pereira
- Released: May 13, 2016
- Recorded: 2016
- Genre: Film score
- Length: 78:43
- Label: Atlantic
- Producer: Heitor Pereira

Heitor Pereira chronology
Minions (2015)	The Angry Birds Movie (2016)	Despicable Me 3 (2017)

On August 26, 2015, Heitor Pereira in an interview to Variety revealed that he would compose the score for The Angry Birds Movie. Pereira described the score as a tapestry of melodies, aside utilizing instruments that include ukuleles, electric guitars, distorted samples of guitar, and analogue synths, he "recorded bird wings flapping, feathers ruffling, woodpecker beaks pecking on a tree, and bird songs"; those sounds were edited, filtered and sampled in order to create percussion tool kits to compose unique themes for each character in the film. The film's score was released on May 13, 2016.

=== Track listing ===
The Angry Birds Movie (Original Motion Picture Score) track listing
No.	Title	Length
1.	"Red on the Run" (Includes The Original Angry Birds Theme by Ari Pulkkinen)	2:31
2.	"Birthday Party"	2:32
3.	"Bird Court"	4:32
4.	"Billy Fight"	1:32
5.	"This is Going to be Awful"	2:13
6.	"Terence and Bomb"	3:58
7.	"Boat Approaches"	1:51
8.	"Poetry Time"	2:11
9.	"Leonard"	2:15
10.	"The Trampoline"	3:12
11.	"Who Are These Weirdos?"	1:35
12.	"Look What I Found!"	1:49
13.	"Paint Your Pain"	2:02
14.	"Does None of This Seem Wrong?"	1:11
15.	"I Need Your Help"	2:26
16.	"Lake of Wisdom"	1:27
17.	"I Think He Saw Us"	1:59
18.	"Helium, It's a Gas"	1:19
19.	"I Used to Believe in You"	4:13
20.	"They're All Gone"	1:27
21.	"Build a Boat"	2:13
22.	"Arrive at Piggy Island"	1:28
23.	"Ready, Aim, Fire!"	3:39
24.	"Risky Idea"	4:10
25.	"Chuck Time"	0:46
26.	"We Want Eggs!"	7:31
27.	"Nothing Like a Statue"	4:14
28.	"Home Tweet Home"	1:01
29.	"Mighty Red"	0:47
30.	"Roomies"	1:23
31.	"Red's Demo"	2:08
32.	"Piggy Demo"	3:08

=== Accolades ===
Award	Date	Category	Recipient(s)	Result	Ref(s).
Hollywood Music in Media Awards	November 17, 2016	Best Original Score – Animated Film	Heitor Pereira	Nominated	
