= Freakish (TV series) =

2010s American horror TV series

- Genre: Horror
- Created by: Beth Szymkowski
- Starring: Leo Howard; Liza Koshy; Adam Hicks; Aislinn Paul; Meghan Rienks; Melvin Gregg; Tyler Chase; Mary Mouser; Alex Ozerov; Hayes Grier; Chad L. Coleman; Niki DeMar; Saxon Sharbino; Amanda Steele; Jake Busey
- Country of origin: United States
- Original language: English
- No. of seasons: 2
- No. of episodes: 20

Production
- Executive producers: Chris Grismer; Brian Robbins; Beth Szymkowski; Shelley Zimmerman; Matthew V. Lewis
- Camera setup: Single-camera
- Running time: 25 minutes
- Production company: AwesomenessTV

Original release
- Network: Hulu
- Release: October 10, 2016 – October 18, 2017

Freakish is an American horror television series that premiered on October 10, 2016, on Hulu. The series features several high-profile social-media stars and celebrities—including Liza Koshy, Hayes Grier, Meghan Rienks, Leo Howard, and Aislinn Paul—and focuses on a group of high-school students who are trapped inside their school when a nearby chemical plant explodes, resulting in residents and other infected students turning into mutated freaks. In July 2018, it was reported that the series had been cancelled after two seasons.

== Premise ==
The series follows a group of students who gather for school detention on a Saturday at Kent High. Other students are on campus as well, but involved in various activities (basketball, debate prep, music, etc.). When a nearby chemical plant explodes, they must work together to find a way to survive with only limited resources and protect themselves from those who have turned into freakish zombie-like creatures as a result of the fallout.

== Characters ==
=== Main ===
- Leo Howard as Grover Jones: a high school student who becomes a survivor at the high school after attending detention so that he can spend time with his crush, Violet Adams
- Liza Koshy as Violet Adams: a high school student who becomes a survivor in the school after getting detention for her lack of patience and tendency to lash out
- Adam Hicks as Diesel Turner: a high school student who becomes a survivor in the school after attending detention for bullying younger students
- Aislinn Paul as Natalie Callaway (season 1): a high school student who becomes a survivor in the school
- Meghan Rienks as Zoe Parker: a high school cheer captain who becomes a survivor in the school after attending detention
- Melvin Gregg as Lashawn Deveraux: a high school student who becomes a survivor in the school with his best friend, Noodle and girlfriend, Zoe
- Tyler Chase as Barrett McIntyre: a high school student who becomes a survivor in the school and has a talent for hacking and problem solving
- Hayes Grier as Noodle Nelson (season 1): Lashawn's best friend who becomes a survivor in the school after attending detention
- Niki DeMar as Sadie (season 2): a member of a secondary group of survivors who later find shelter at the school
- Saxon Sharbino as Anka Keller (season 2): a member of a secondary group of survivors who later find shelter at the school
- Jordan Calloway as Zane Hiatt (season 2): Violet's ex-boyfriend and a member of a secondary group of survivors who later find shelter at the school

=== Recurring ===
- Mary Mouser as Mary Jones (season 1)
- Alex Ozerov as Lyle (season 1)
- Chad L. Coleman as Coach (season 1)
- Chad Michael Collins as John Collins (season 1)
- Olivia Gonzales as Addy (season 1)
- Amanda Steele as Hailey (season 2)
- Jake Busey as Earl (season 2)
- Brant Daugherty as Jake (season 2)
- Tati Gabrielle as Birdie (season 2)
- Ryan McCartan as Oliver Keller (season 2)
- Joy Osmanski as Felicity (season 2)
- Arden Cho as Tonya (season 2)

=== Guest ===
- Caitlin Carver as Elise (season 2)
- Raushanah Simmons as Poe (season 2)

== Episodes ==
Season	Episodes	Originally released
1	10	October 10, 2016
2	10	October 18, 2017

=== Season 1 (2016) ===
No. overall	No. in season	Title	Directed by	Written by	Original release date
1	1	"Detention"	Chris Grismer	Beth Szymkowski	October 10, 2016
Despite not having Saturday detention, Grover Jones attends anyway just to be near the girl of his dreams, Violet Adams. When a nearby chemical plant explodes, they find themselves trapped in the school along with his sister Mary, basketball players Lashawn and Noodle, Lashawn's girlfriend Zoe, bully Diesel, computer whiz geek Barrett, and Natalie while the other students venture outside to try to find any survivors. At the end of the episode, one of the students who ventured outside, Lyle, re-enters the school, with strange illness-like symptoms. When Grover questions him, Lyle replies: "All dead."
2	2	"Winds of Change"	Chris Grismer	Beth Szymkowski	October 10, 2016
As Grover, Violet, Barrett, and the Coach try to get more answers from Lyle, more students show up, all experiencing the same symptoms. They go to sleep momentarily, and wake up as zombies. The remaining students check on food and supplies. As Grover and Mary try to bring food to a sleeping Coach, they find him being eaten by the reanimated "freaks". Grover and Mary barely manage to escape and barricade the freaks inside. Mary goes to the bathroom to try to catch her breath, and is revealed to have been bitten.
3	3	"Secrets"	Michael A. Allowitz	Beth Szymkowski	October 10, 2016
Grover learns that Mary has been bitten, and starts bringing her supplies. However, Mary slowly starts experiencing the same symptoms displayed by the freaks and she begins acting strangely toward other people. Barrett attempts to contact help using a CB radio, but appears to be unsuccessful. However, when no one is looking he plugs in the radio and speaks with an unknown person. He is caught by Mary, who tries to tell the group. The freak instinct comes over her and she prepares to eat him, but Grover intervenes. The remaining survivors become suspicious of Grover, and Violet is the one who defends him when the truth comes out. Mary goes to sleep, but a few hours later wakes up a freak.
4	4	"Trapped"	Chris Grismer	Matthew V. Lewis	October 10, 2016
Grover goes in to check up on Mary, but is shocked to learn she has become a freak. Mary escapes, and the group splits up to look for her. Lashawn and Zoey manage to find her in the locker room, along with a dead Noodle. Zoey narrowly escapes and Mary is knocked unconscious. She is locked up as the remaining group decide what to do. Grover manages to convince them to keep her alive. Barrett goes down later and burns her with a flame in order to learn more about the freaks. Grover finds out and gets angry, but the group takes a vote to determine whether to keep her alive or continue testing on her. The votes are tied, with the deciding vote coming down to Violet; they agree to keep testing. Grover angrily goes to confront Mary, and the episode ends with the implication that he is going to kill her.
5	5	"Weakness"	Michael A. Allowitz	Beth Szymkowski	October 10, 2016
It is revealed in the opening minutes that Grover did not go through with killing Mary, and along with Diesel helped her escape to the outside. Lashawn is acting strangely, and the kids begin to suspect he might be infected, but it turns out that he is running low on insulin. Grover and Barrett find two more vials, and Barrett puts one in his jacket while giving the other one to Zoe, but at a cost. Zoe and Barrett strike an uneasy alliance. Grover is still angry with Violet, but later make amends and dedicates a wall in memory of their fallen friends and teachers. Diesel arrives with more bad news - the plumbing has stopped working and the water is gone.
6	6	"Thirst"	Chris Grismer	Beth Szymkowski	October 10, 2016
While the group carefully rations everyone's remaining liquids, Grover discovers that the fallout shelter stores gas masks that will enable them to escape. Violet plans to make knockout gas for use on the freaks so they can go in and retrieve the masks. She and Zoe climb through air vents into the chemistry lab to gather the necessary chemicals, and while at it battle a freak. After the successful mission, Lashawn and Zoe intimately make out. Zoe and Natalie make amend their relationship, reuniting as friends. Grover and Violet grow closer and dance together while Natalie, with the help of Zoe's advice, reveals to the rest of group that she is pregnant. Unbeknownst to them, the freak that Violet was believed to have killed survived and manages to enter the air vents.
7	7	"Knockout"	Chris Grismer	Matthew V. Lewis	October 10, 2016
Grover walks in on Barrett secretly talking to people on the radio and rats him out. Violet, losing her temper, knocks him out with the newly made sleeping gas, unintentionally rendering Diesel unconscious as well. This mistake prompts her to privately record herself revealing how she believes she caused the chemical plant explosion and the disaster following it. Lashawn, Grover, and Violet take on the mission to go in the shelter. Barrett wakes up, and Natalie tries to warn Violet. They find out Grover got knocked out by the gas, but are too late and are forced to leave him trapped with the now awakened freaks. Eventually they find a way to run in and save him, and succeed, while Diesel, Barrett, and Zoe fight the freak that escaped through the air vents. The group celebrates as the others come back with all 7 gas masks and commend Grover, but things take a bad turn when they discover that only one of the masks works.
8	8	"Outsiders"	Heather Cappiello	Beth Szymkowski	October 10, 2016
The group decides who will go outside to look for help, but problems arise when some members aren’t able to safely go. Natalie helps Diesel through his guilt over not being able to go outside. Violet and Grover struggle to secure the school from freaks. Outside Lashawn finds resources that could help the survivors but he loses contact with them before he can get back to the school. With no food or water left in the school, the group decides to leave to look for resources despite the fact they don’t have masks. Someone new discovers the survivors in the school.
9	9	"Saved"	Tony Solomons	Matthew V. Lewis	October 10, 2016
John Collins, a rescue and recovery agent who found the school through Barrett’s radio, claims to have a way to protect the survivors from turning into freaks if they breathe in the toxic air; Barrett is reluctant to trust the solution. While they wait to be evacuated, Violet and Grover grow closer. Natalie becomes suspicious that Barrett may have been involved in the explosion, and she raises her concerns with the rest of the group. Barrett shows Grover that the vaccines brought by Collins are actually poison, and the two find themselves captured by Collins before they can warn the others.
10	10	"Prey"	Chris Grismer	Beth Szymkowski & Matthew V. Lewis	October 10, 2016
In the season finale, things come to a head when John Collins is revealed to be a traitor and Natalie to be dying from the poison. The group becomes aware of shocking secrets behind the chemical plant. The group attempts to hold Collins hostage, but he manages to escape. Diesel is shot in the process but survives. Violet is captured and Collins demands his suit in return for her life. Grover and the group comply to his demands, but secretly attach an alarm to the suit. Collins secretly removes the basement shelter door barricade, and the alarm on his suit goes off after exiting to the outside, attracting freaks that then kill him. Diesel and Natalie share one last moment with each other before she sacrifices herself in order to save the others when they are about to lose against the freaks that have suddenly escaped the shelter. Diesel and the other remaining four survivors are left in grief. Afterwards, it is shown that Grover had uncovered a photo of himself from Collins' bag which labeled him as a retrieval target. In the final scene, Lashawn, whom they all thought was dead, turns out has survived and returns, informing Zoe and Barrett that he had no choice but to lead new survivors to the school.

=== Season 2 (2017) ===
No. overall	No. in season	Title	Directed by	Written by	Original release date
11	1	"Trespass"	Chris Grismer	Beth Szymkowski	October 18, 2017
When Zoe and Barrett discover that Lashawn is still alive and has arrived back at the high school, they also discover that he didn't come back alone but instead returned with more people who want to kill the remaining 6 witnesses. Zoe reveals to Lashawn that Natalie died and Barrett warns the others of the events that are happening. Zoe warns Diesel, who is on the floor grieving over the loss of Natalie, and returns to the group. As the reinforcers enter the building, the students hide out. Lashawn gives himself up to one of the reinforcers, who takes him to another room and tortures him until he gives up his friends' location. Grover, Barrett, and Diesel decide to go out to retrieve Barrett's radio to call for help. Grover is then seen by one of the reinforcers. Grover then shows him a picture, in which the reinforcer is then killed by Diesel. The reinforcer then lures out Lashawn and breaks his leg so he can't run from the freaks. He is then rescued by Diesel, Barrett, and Grover. The rest of the reinforcers leave the school, believing that Lashawn is dead and no one remains in the school. Diesel then confronts Grover about the picture that Grover showed the reinforcer. Lashawn wakes up to Zoe knowing that his leg is broken. Grover and Violet are seen walking through the hallways, and the camera pans outside revealing a man walking through the chemical storm without a mask.
12	2	"Attraction"	Chris Grismer	Erin Maher & Kay Reindl	October 18, 2017
Barrett questions Lashawn about what was happening outside the school, and Lashawn reveals what's really happening at Keller. Zoe and Lashawn continue to reconnect but Zoe grows worried about his broken leg, later revealing that he’ll need antibiotics to help the injury heal due to his diabetes. With no antibiotics in the school, Grover looks outside; when his path back becomes blocked by freaks, he must venture further than planned. Back at the school, Lashawn's health deteriorates, and Diesel and Barrett become suspicious of the freaks' strange behaviour as they surround the school. Grover finds antibiotics, but before he can return to the school he meets another group of survivors and allows them to come with him. Barrett figures out that it is Lashawn's injury attracting the freaks to the school, while Violet and Diesel struggle to secure the building. Lashawn asks Barrett to help him save the others.
13	3	"Strangers"	Michael A. Allowitz	Kristine Huntley	October 18, 2017
Grover returns to the school with the other survivors, but the original group quickly grows suspicious of the newcomers. It is revealed that Violet has a troubled history with one of the survivors, Zaine, and this causes conflict between her and Grover. As certain people clash with the newcomers, the original group divides into those who want to help them and those who want them to leave. Diesel becomes increasingly suspicious of siblings Anka and Ollie, who seem to have an agenda of their own. The two groups finally come to an agreement on how they can begin to trust each other, but one of the newcomers has an unfortunate run in with an intruder in the school.
14	4	"Trust Issues"	Stacy Title	Adam J. Karp	October 18, 2017
The group becomes more suspicious of Anka and Ollie, which leads to Violet volunteering to try to get information out of Zaine. Anka makes Zoe question Barrett's involvement in Lashawn's death. Zaine confirms the group's suspicions as Felicity and Diesel debate the ethics of killing the freaks. Zoe confronts Barrett about Lashawn's death, but is placated when he tells her that he died peacefully. When Grover finds the weapons missing, the two groups become enemies again - leading the original group to keep Sadie, Zaine, Anka and Ollie locked up. It’s revealed that Anka and Ollie are Kellers which increases everyone’s suspicions of them. Felicity finds one of the survivors dead, and Diesel finds out about the intruder. Anka and Ollie reveal that they have a way to save the survivors. The intruder has plans to take control of the school, and he isn’t alone.
15	5	"Self-Preservation"	Chris Grismer	Beth Szymkowski	October 18, 2017
Anka and Ollie try to convince the others to trust them, and Zoe becomes more suspicious of Barrett when he tells varying accounts of Lashawn's death. Violet and Grover clash over the morality of Barrett's actions. Zoe makes a plan with the newcomers to trust Anka and Ollie's escape plan. The others plan to leave the school before more outsiders arrive, but Diesel faces a problem with leaving. The newcomers struggle to find an escape route that avoids the freaks and soon become trapped by them after their escape plan fails, only escaping after a member of the group sacrifices themselves. As the group prepares to leave, it is revealed that Grover sabotaged the newcomers' escape and that he was a retrieval target. The group turns on Grover, including Violet.
16	6	"Dare"	Tony Solomons	Erin Maher & Kay Reindl	October 18, 2017
With everyone still against him, Grover plans to leave the school and Barrett decides to join him as he still does not trust the Kellers. Violet and Zaine begin to reconnect, and Zoe turns to Anka when the others reject her for siding with the newcomers. Outside, Grover and Barrett try to make it out of the contaminated zone but get stranded and attacked by freaks. In the school, tensions rise and alliances shift as the remaining survivors wait for help to arrive. After clashing with Anka, Ollie decides to betray the other survivors and plans to leave on his own.
17	7	"Haters"	Craig David Wallace	Adam J. Karp	October 18, 2017
The intruder is shown to be part of a larger group of survivors, some of whom were experimented on at Keller. Tensions are still high in the aftermath of Ollie's betrayal, and Anka finds herself with no allies. Zaine tries to make amends between Violet and Zoe. Outside, Grover and Barrett find all of the town's exits blocked. Sadie and Diesel begin to connect as the group scrambles to come up with a new escape plan. Grover and Barrett visit their homes to find Grover's destroyed and Barrett's surprisingly untouched. A misunderstanding at the school leads to tensions rising between Zaine and Violet once more. Back with the new group of outsiders, relationships are strained causing tension within the group. Barrett explains to Grover the reasons behind his plan to expose Keller Chemical. Grover finds out that his father could have been more involved in Keller's experiments.
18	8	"Humanity"	Tony Solomons	Kristine Huntley	October 18, 2017
Grover continues to defend his father against Barrett’s allegations. They discover that one of Barrett's neighbours survived the blast and she provides them with shelter; they are then caught in a difficult situation when she goes to extremes to save her brother. The outsiders arrive at the school, injuring one of the remaining group. With the others trapped by the outsiders, Violet and Anka are left to figure out how to deal with the intruders. Grover, Barrett and Elise receive a news broadcast calling all survivors to a rescue point, but Elise tries to sacrifice Grover to save her brother. Birdie, an outsider, finds Violet wandering the school but Violet is saved by Anka who created a diversion. Grover struggles to come to terms with his father’s involvement at Keller. In the shelter, Diesel, Zaine and Zoe find a hidden room with a sealed door.
19	9	"Rescue"	Craig David Wallace	Erin Maher & Kay Reindl	October 18, 2017
Grover and Barrett arrive at the rescue point to find a government shelter but are hesitant to trust them. Disguising themselves as government agents, they explore the shelter. Grover and Barrett learn from the news that Ollie Keller was the only survivor from the high school and both grieve the loss of their friends. Back at the school tensions continue to rise between the outsiders, leaving Birdie feeling torn between Hailey and Jake. Grover and Barrett make a discovery that links the government to Keller Chemical, and make plans to expose the truth - but discover a shocking truth along the way. Anka and Violet develop a plan to save the others from the shelter and get rid of the outsiders, but they find it more challenging than they planned. Hailey becomes an ally to the girls after an argument with Birdie. At the government shelter, Grover and Barrett are discovered and one of them sacrifices themselves.
20	10	"Turning"	Craig David Wallace	Beth Szymkowski	October 18, 2017
At the school, Violet distracts the outsiders while Anka saves the others from the shelter. Outside, Barrett struggles to cope as he believes he is the only one left. The situation with the outsiders takes a dramatic turn and one of the group is killed. The group begins to worry that they’ve been exposed as both sides grieve for their lost members. Diesel and Sadie grow closer as he confides in her. Barrett is challenged to take responsibility for the part he played in the chemical explosion, and he finds an old ally on the outside. Back at the school, the group comes together to remember all the people they have lost but tensions rise when they realise one of them is slowly turning into a freak. Grover awakens, unaffected by his exposure, only to find his father at his bedside.

== Production ==
Freakish is produced by AwesomenessTV and was created by Beth Szymkowski. Hulu acquired exclusive streaming rights during production of the program. The show premiered on October 10, 2016.

Hulu renewed the series for a second season, which consisted of 10 episodes and premiered on October 18, 2017.

On July 27, 2018, it was reported that the series had been canceled due to low ratings.

== Reception ==
=== Critical response ===
Sonia Saraiya writing for Variety called the show "a silly, lightweight half-hour, somewhere between horror thriller and teen soap" and ultimately said "The show never quite becomes interesting enough to transcend either the dully predictable beats of zombie horror or the plodding angst of young adulthood."

Neil Genzlinger for The New York Times said of the show "Here in the age of zombie TV, lots about 'Freakish' seems familiar, but with the episodes shorter than a half-hour each, the series goes down easily."

Emily Longeretta at Hollywoodlife.com described the show as "The Walking Dead meets The Breakfast Club."

On Rotten Tomatoes season 1 has 4 reviews, 3 were positive and 1 was negative.

=== Awards and nominations ===
Year	Award	Category	Nominee(s)	Result	Ref.
2017	Shorty Awards	Web Series	Freakish	Nominated	
