= The Outfield (film) =

- Official poster
- Directed by: Michael Goldfine; Eli Gonda
- Written by: Lydia Genner
- Produced by: Michael Goldfine; Gil Kruger
- Starring: Nash Grier; Cameron Dallas; Joey Bragg
- Cinematography: Donald McKinnon
- Edited by: Brett W. Bachman
- Production company: Fullscreen Films
- Distributed by: Fullscreen
- Release date: November 10, 2015 (United States)
- Running time: 90 minutes
- Country: United States
- Language: English

The Outfield is an American sports comedy-drama film written by Lydia Genner and directed by Michael Goldfine & Eli Gonda. The film stars Nash Grier, Cameron Dallas, and Joey Bragg.

The film was released through video on demand on November 10, 2015, by Fullscreen Films.

== Plot ==
Three varsity baseball players, who have been best friends since childhood, enter their final year of high school and must make difficult choices on and off the baseball field. They have to decide between what they want and what their parents want.

== Cast ==
- Cameron Dallas as Frankie Payton
- Nash Grier as Jack Sanders
- Joey Bragg as Austin York
- Caroline Sunshine as Emily Jordan
- Sheldon White as Jeremy Porro
- Olivia Stuck as Kelsey Stecken
- Burnie Burns as Theo Rasmussen

== Production ==
In January 2015, it was announced that Fullscreen, a popular YouTube network, would be launching a division to focus on films and that The Outfield, starring Cameron Dallas and Nash Grier, would be one of the first films produced; the film marked Grier's acting debut. On January 28, 2015, it was announced that Joey Bragg and Caroline Sunshine had joined the cast of the film. On February 4, 2015, it was announced that Olivia Stuck had joined the cast of the film. The casting of Burnie Burns was announced on February 15, 2015.

=== Filming ===
Principal photography on the film began on January 24, 2015, and concluded on February 21, 2015. Filmed at Ramona Convent Secondary School.

== Release ==
On July 24, 2015, the first 9 minutes of the film were screened at VidCon. The film was released through video on demand on November 10, 2015.
