= Matt Bellassai =

American comedian and writer

Matt Bellassai is an American comedian and writer. He hosts the Unhappy Hour podcast and web series To Be Honest. He formerly starred in the BuzzFeed web series Whine About It, which attracted 3.5 million weekly viewers. He received the 2016 People's Choice Award for Favorite Social Media Star. He is the author of Everything Is Awful: And Other Observations, a collection of essays.

Bellassai grew up in the Chicago suburbs of Alsip and Palos Heights, Illinois. He studied journalism at Northwestern University, and interned at the magazine In These Times. After graduation he moved to New York and joined BuzzFeed as a writer of humorous lists, and soon developed Whine About It, a series of videos featuring himself drinking wine and complaining.
