= Hayes Grier =

American internet personality

- Born: Benjamin Hayes Grier; June 8, 2000 (age 26); Mooresville, North Carolina, U.S.
- Occupation: Internet personality
- Years active: 2013–present

Benjamin Hayes Grier (born June 8, 2000) is an American Internet personality. He became known for his popularity on Vine, a now-defunct video sharing service.

== Early life ==
Grier is the third child of four in his family. His oldest brother, Will, completed his college football career in 2018 as the starting quarterback for West Virginia University and was chosen by the Carolina Panthers in the third round of the 2019 NFL draft. He has another older brother, Nash, who is also known for posting videos on Vine. He also has a younger sister.

Grier was a celebrity contestant on the 21st season of Dancing With The Stars, partnering with Emma Slater. Competing at age 15, he is the youngest male contestant to have ever been on the show. On October 26 (Week 7), Grier and Slater were eliminated and finished the competition in 8th place, with the show's co-host, Tom Bergeron, remarking that he was "leaving on a night when he excelled." Shortly after leaving the show, Grier signed a deal with Creative Artists Agency for media and publishing exposure and announced that he'd be joining the Dancing With The Stars Tour in early 2015. Hayes is also in the Hulu TV show called Freakish season one and has a reality show on the app go90 called Top Grier.

In November 2016, Grier released his first novel, Hollywood Days with Hayes. In 2017, Verizon renewed Top Grier for two more seasons. The show revolves around the life of the 17-year old digital influencer and his family and friends.

== Personal life ==
On July 28, 2016, it was reported that Grier was involved in a dirt bike accident and was sent to the hospital. He had several broken bones but was released two days later on July 30, 2016.

On July 31, 2021, Grier was arrested on outstanding warrants from California. Grier was charged with felony conspiracy, common law robbery, and assault causing serious bodily injury, after allegedly assaulting a man and robbing him of his $1,200 cell phone. The charges were dropped on November 1, 2021, due to insufficient evidence.

== Filmography ==
| Year | Title | Role | Notes |
|---|---|---|---|
| 2013 | "I Look Good On You" by Bera | Himself | Music video |
| 2015 | "Can't Feel My Face" parody by Bart Baker | Himself | Featured in video |
| 2015 | "I Really Like You" parody by Bart Baker | Himself | Featured in video |
| 2015 | Dancing with the Stars | Himself | Contestant (season 21) |
| 2016 | Freakish | Noodle | Recurring role (season 1) |
| 2016–present | Top Grier | Himself | Lead role |
