= Nash Grier =

American Internet personality (born 1997)

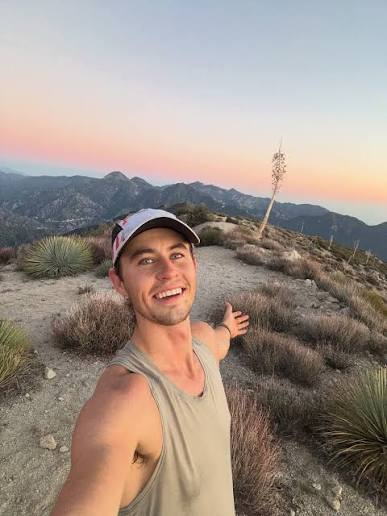
- Grier trail running in the San Gabriel Mountains 2026
- Born: Hamilton Nash Grier; December 28, 1997 (age 28); Greensboro, North Carolina, U.S.
- Education: Davidson Day School
- Known for: Vine videos
- Spouse: Taylor Giavasis (m. 2024)
- Children: 2

Nash Grier (born December 28, 1997) is an American internet celebrity. He became known for his online videos on the now-defunct video sharing service Vine in early 2013. By 2015, Grier was the second most-followed user on the platform.

== Early life ==
Hamilton Nash Grier was born and raised in North Carolina by mother Elizabeth Floyd and father Chad Grier, who is now one of his managers. He is the second-oldest child with an older brother, Will Grier, a football quarterback who was drafted by the Carolina Panthers in the 2019 NFL draft; a younger brother, Hayes, who also posted vines; and a younger half-sister, Skylynn.

Grier was a freshman at Davidson Day School when the mobile app Vine was released, a social media platform which allows users to post looping 6-second videos for others to view. Grier began to post comedy-related videos for friends and classmates and quickly amassed a wider fanbase.

== Career ==
Grier began making short videos on the app Vine after its release in early 2013. One of his initial videos gained recognition and Grier quickly began gaining thousands of followers on the app. Grier has stated that he is mostly self-taught on how to edit videos, and his 'apparent spontaneity' is actually shrewdly crafted and scripted, with clips refilmed many times and sometimes edited for hours. His management team confirmed that major brands paid Grier anywhere between $25,000–$100,000 to advertise their products in his Vines. Because of his popularity, Grier has appeared on various news shows including Good Morning America and The View.

As his popularity grew, Grier joined a newly formed group called Magcon (Meet and Greet Convention) in October of that year described as "a boy-band phenomenon without the band." Grier participated in the group with his brother Hayes and other Vine stars Cameron Dallas, Matthew Espinosa, Jack & Jack, Taylor Caniff, Shawn Mendes, Carter Reynolds, and Mahogany Lox. The group held events where fans could meet and interact with internet celebrities. The shows drew in thousands of fans who followed the group members on social media.

In April 2013, Grier posted a Vine in which he said, "Yes, it is! Fag!" in response to an OraQuick at-home oral HIV test ad which stated, "Testing for HIV... It's not a gay thing." Grier later deleted the vine but a recording of it resurfaced in July 2014 and Grier faced renewed scrutiny. Grier posted an apology on Twitter noting that he was "young, ignorant, stupid and in a bad place. I've moved on and learned from my mistakes and I am so truly sorry to anyone I have offended."

In April 2014, the Magcon group broke up due to disagreements between members' managers. Following the split, Grier moved to Los Angeles with fellow Magcon member Cameron Dallas to focus on his career. That summer, Grier joined DigiFest, a "social media tour" with thousands of attendees where personalities performed comedy and dance sets, Q&A sessions, and posed for pictures with fans.

Grier and other members of his management have released mobile games and social media apps including Cash Dash, Mobli, and Challenged. Grier has his own website where fans can buy his merchandise as well as an Aéropostale clothing line called "UnitedXXVI," designed in part by Grier, Dallas, and younger brother Hayes. Aéropostale faced backlash for partnering with Grier due to his earlier controversies. BuzzFeed News noted "the backlash highlights the challenges brands face in working with today's new breed of celebrity in a supremely competitive landscape."

Grier's first lead acting role was in Fullscreen's The Outfield, which premiered November 10, 2015, worldwide on the iTunes Store. He also directed a music video for singer Bera called "I Look Good On You", which was released on Grier's YouTube channel. In 2016, he appeared on the cover of Vanity Teen magazine. In 2017, Grier appeared in You Get Me with co-star Bella Thorne.

== Personal life ==
Grier is married to Taylor Giavasis, whom he has dated since 2015. The couple have two children together.

== Filmography ==
Year	Title	Role	Notes
2014	"Mmm Yeah" by Austin Mahone	Himself	Lyric video
2014	"Work For It" by Poo Bear	Himself	Music video
2014	"Blank Space Parody" by Bart Baker	Taylor Swift's boyfriend	Featured in video
2014	"Anaconda Parody" by Bart Baker	Safari Dude	Featured in video
2015	"I Look Good On You" by Bera	Himself	Featured in video as well as directed
2015	The Outfield	Jack Sanders	premiered November 10, 2015
2016	The Deleted	Ryder	TV series
2017	You Get Me	Gil	Netflix Film
2019	Scream	Tommy "TJ" Jenkins	TV series; guest cast
