= Cameron Dallas =

American social media personality (born 1994)

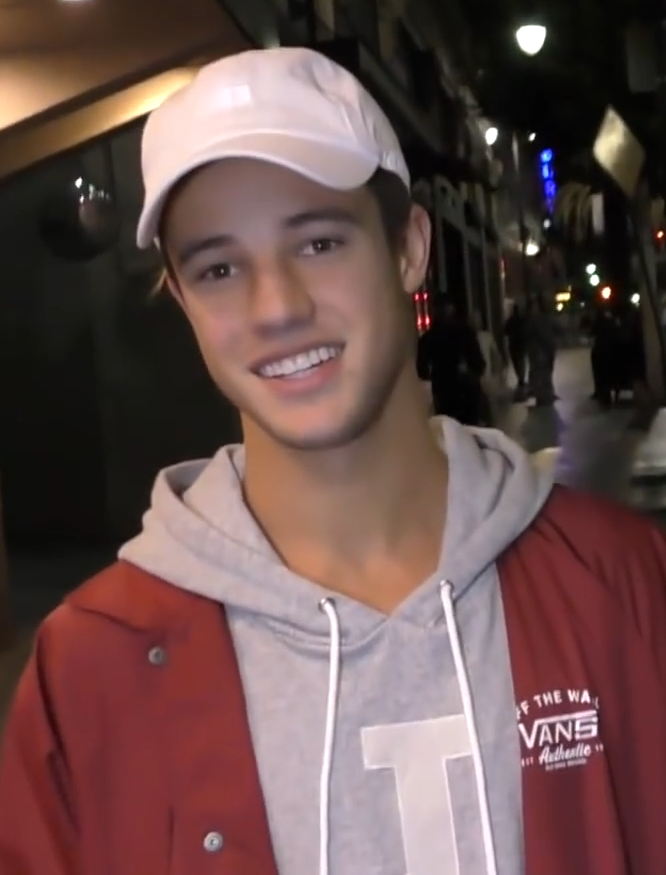
- Dallas in 2016
- Born: September 8, 1994 (age 32); Whittier, California, U.S.
- Occupations: Social media personality; singer; actor
- Years active: 2012–present
- Known for: YouTube, Vine videos, magcon
- Television: Chasing Cameron
- Children: 1

Cameron Alexander Dallas (born September 8, 1994) is an American social media personality, actor, and singer. He is best known for his prominence on the video applications Vine and YouTube. Dallas starred in two films in 2014 and 2015, Expelled and The Outfield. In 2016, Cameron starred on his Netflix reality show, Chasing Cameron, which followed him on his singing tour of Europe. In 2020, he assumed the role of Aaron Samuels in the musical adaptation of Mean Girls. In September 2020, he released Dear Scarlett, his first album.

== Career ==
Dallas began his career in September 2012, posting Vines of himself playing jokes and pranks on his friends and family. In 2014, Dallas had 8.1 million followers on Vine, making him the 11th most followed account, and 11.3 million followers on Twitter. As of 2017, Dallas had over 20 million followers on Instagram and made approximately $17,000 per sponsored post.

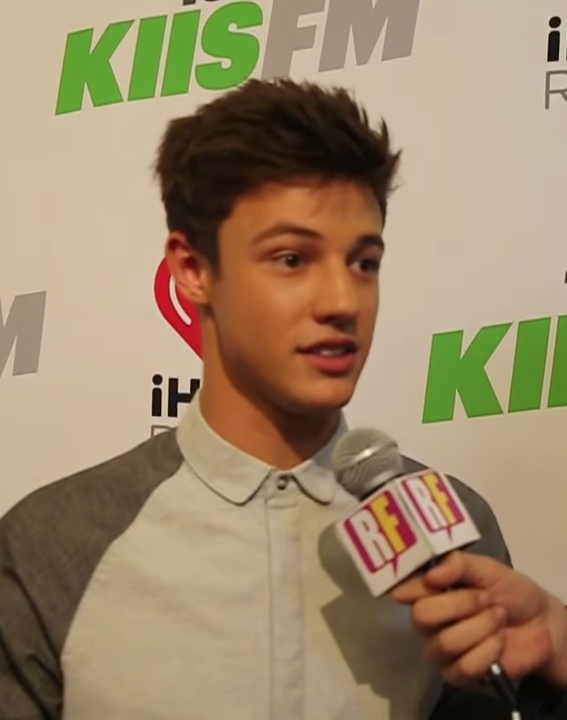
Dallas at the 2014 KIIS-FM Jingle Ball

In April 2014, AwesomenessTV CEO Brian Robbins announced he was making a film starring Dallas. The film, titled Expelled, was the story of a prankster expelled from school, and was released later that year, on December 12, 2014. In May 2015, Dallas starred in two episodes of the NBC thriller television series American Odyssey. That same year, Dallas appeared in The Outfield opposite Nash Grier, and Caroline Sunshine. The film was released on November 10, 2015, through video on demand. In November 2015, it was revealed Dallas had been cast in Neighbors 2: Sorority Rising. However, his scenes were cut.

On April 20, 2015, Dallas released his debut single "She Bad". He also was later featured in Daniel Skye's track "All I Want Is You". In June 2016, Dallas announced that he would be starring in an upcoming Netflix reality series Chasing Cameron. It premiered on December 27, 2016. By July 2017, he had reached 20 million followers on Instagram and 11 million on Twitter.

Dallas won Teen Choice Awards in 2014, 2015 and 2016, and a People’s Choice Award in 2017.

In 2020, Dallas made his Broadway debut as Aaron Samuels in Mean Girls, while the originator of the role, Kyle Selig, took a leave of absence. That year, Dallas also released his first album, Dear Scarlett, on September 8.

== Personal life ==
He has described his ethnic background as half Scottish, a quarter Mexican and a quarter German.

On December 31, 2018, New Year's Eve, Dallas was arrested and charged with assault for allegedly punching a man in the face at the Hyatt Residence Club Grand Aspen in Aspen, Colorado. He had previously been arrested on felony vandalism charges in 2015.

On August 23, 2019, Dallas announced on social media that for the past two-and-a-half years he had been struggling with addiction, depression, and family trauma. On October 15, 2019, he ran in a charity that helped raise money for those struggling with addiction and to help them get access to treatment.

On July 26, 2025, Dallas had his first daughter, named Indy Lee Dallas, with his girlfriend Madisyn Menchaca.

== Filmography ==
=== Film ===
Year	Title	Role
2014	Expelled	Felix O'Neil
2015	The Frog Kingdom	Freddie (voice)
2015	The Outfield	Frankie Payton

=== Television ===
Year	Title	Role	Notes
2015	AwesomenessTV	Himself	Episode: "Kanye: What's In My Murse?"
2015	American Odyssey	Cameron	Episodes: "Wingman", "Beat Feat"
2016	Chasing Cameron	Himself	10 episodes

=== Theatre ===
Year	Production	Role	Location	Category
2020	Mean Girls	Aaron Samuels	August Wilson Theatre	Broadway

== Discography ==
=== Studio albums ===
Title	Details
Dear Scarlett	Released: September 8, 2020; Label: Under No Association; Format: Digital download
CATCH!	Released: February 1, 2026; Label: DGA Records; Format: Digital download
RUNNING WILD	Released: March 1, 2026; Label: DGA Records; Format: Digital download
Saturdays	Released: April 1, 2026; Label: DGA Records; Format: Digital download
the greatest	Released: May 1, 2026; Label: DGA Records; Format: Digital downloads
Hay Fever	Released: June 1, 2026; Label: DGA Records; Format: Digital download
S.O.S	Released: July 1, 2026; Label: DGA Records; Format: Digital download
WANTED	Released: August 1, 2026; Label: DGA Records; Format: Digital download

=== Singles ===
==== As lead artist ====
List of singles as lead artist, with selected chart positions
Title	Year	Peak chart positions			Album
Title	Year	US	US R&B/HH	US Rap	Album
"She Bad"	2015	— (Note: "She Bad" did not enter the Billboard Hot 100, but peaked at No. 18 on the Bubbling Under Hot 100 Singles.)	46	— (Note: "She Bad" did not enter the Billboard Rap songs, but peaked at No. 8 on the Digital Rap Songs chart.)	Non-album singles
"Why Haven't I Met You?"	2018	—	—	—	Non-album singles
"Helpless"	2020	—	—	—	TBA
"Secrets"	2020	—	—	—	Dear Scarlett
"Dangerous"	2020	—	—	—	Dear Scarlett
"Used to Me"	2020	—	—	—	Dear Scarlett
"Would You"	2020	—	—	—	Dear Scarlett
"—" denotes a recording that did not chart or was not released in that territory.

==== As featured artist ====
List of singles as featured artist, with selected chart positions
Title	Year	Peak chart positions	Album
Title	Year	US Pop	Album
"All I Want" (Daniel Skye featuring Cameron Dallas)	2015	— (Note: "All I Want" did not enter the Billboard Pop songs, but peaked at No. 35 on the Digital Pop Songs chart.)	Non-album single
"—" denotes releases that did not chart or were not released in that territory.

== Awards and nominations ==
Year	Nominated	Award	Result
2014	2014 Teen Choice Awards	Choice Web Star: Male	Nominated
2014	2014 Teen Choice Awards	Choice Web: Viner	Won
2015	2015 Teen Choice Awards	Choice Web Star: Male	Won
2015	2015 Teen Choice Awards	Choice Web: Viner	Won
2016	42nd People's Choice Awards	Favorite Social Media Star	Nominated
2016	2016 Teen Choice Awards	Choice Male Hottie	Nominated
2016	2016 Teen Choice Awards	Choice Web Star: Male	Nominated
2016	2016 Teen Choice Awards	Choice Social Media King	Won
2016	Streamy Awards	Entertainer of the Year	Nominated
2017	43rd People's Choice Awards	Favorite Social Media Star	Won
2017	Streamy Awards	Creator of the Year	Nominated
