= Just Dance: Disney Party 2 =

2015 video game

- Developer: Ubisoft San Francisco
- Publisher: Ubisoft
- Series: Just Dance
- Platforms: Xbox 360, Xbox One, Wii, Wii U
- Release: October 20, 2015
- Genres: Music, rhythm, dance
- Modes: Single-player, multiplayer

Just Dance: Disney Party 2 is a 2015 game in the Just Dance series published by Ubisoft. It is the sequel to Just Dance: Disney Party (a spin-off title of the Just Dance Kids series) and was released on October 20, 2015 for Wii, Wii U and Kinect for Xbox 360 and Xbox One. Unlike the previous game, Just Dance: Disney Party 2 only features songs from Disney Channel original movies and shows, which include songs from Austin & Ally, Descendants, Teen Beach 2, Liv and Maddie, Violetta, Girl Meets World and many more.

== Gameplay ==
The in-game portion is similar to that of the original Just Dance: Disney Party entry. The pictograms are colored purple and look like those in the Just Dance main series games. In the previous game, the players could choose a "costume" for their own character that rates their dancing, even though none of the ratings are displayed. In this game, they choose a facial recreation of 15 Disney characters. Also, the "crown" sound byte has been altered.

== Track list ==
25 songs are included in this track list.

Song	Artist	TV show/film	Year
"A Billion Hits"	Ross Lynch	Austin & Ally	2011
"Be Our Guest"	Cast of Descendants	Descendants	2015
"Better in Stereo"	Dove Cameron	Liv & Maddie	2013
"Can You Feel It"	Ross Lynch	Austin & Ally	2012
"Chasin' the Beat of My Heart"	Ross Lynch	Austin & Ally	2013
"Cruisin' for a Bruisin"	Ross Lynch, Jason Evigan & Grace Phipps	Teen Beach Movie	2013
"Did I Mention"	Jeff Lewis	Descendants	2015
"En Mi Mundo"	Martina Stoessel	Violetta	2012
"Evil Like Me"	Kristin Chenoweth and Dove Cameron	Descendants	2015
"Falling For Ya"	Jordan Fisher & Chrissie Fit	Teen Beach 2	2015
"Gotta Be Me"	Ross Lynch, Maia Mitchell, Garrett Clayton, Grace Phipps, John DeLuca & Jordan Fisher	Teen Beach 2	2015
"Had Me @ Hello"	Olivia Holt	Girl vs. Monster	2012
"Hoy Somos Más"	Cast of Violetta	Violetta	2015
"Keep It Undercover"	Zendaya	K.C. Undercover	2015
"Me & You"	Laura Marano	Austin & Ally	2014
"Right Where I Want To Be"	Garrett Clayton & Grace Phipps	Teen Beach 2	2015
"Rotten to the Core"	Dove Cameron, Cameron Boyce, Booboo Stewart & Sofia Carson	Descendants	2015
"Set It Off"	Cast of Descendants	Descendants	2015
"Take On the World"	Rowan Blanchard & Sabrina Carpenter	Girl Meets World	2014
"That's How We Do"	Ross Lynch, Maia Mitchell, Garrett Clayton & Grace Phipps	Teen Beach 2	2015
"Time of Our Lives"	Olivia Holt	I Didn't Do It	2014
"Too Much"	Zendaya	Zapped	2014
"Twist Your Frown Upside Down"	Ross Lynch, Maia Mitchell, Garrett Clayton & Grace Phipps	Teen Beach 2	2015
"What A Girl Is"	Dove Cameron	Liv & Maddie	2015
"You, Me & the Beat"	Dove Cameron	Liv & Maddie	2013
