= Jordan Fisher =

American actor and singer (born 1994)

- Fisher in 2026
- Born: April 24, 1994 (age 32); Birmingham, Alabama, U.S.
- Occupations: Actor; singer; dancer
- Years active: 2009–present
- Spouse: Ellie Woods (m. 2020)
- Children: 1
- Musical career
- Genres: Pop; soul; jazz; R&B; broadway; hip hop
- Instruments: Vocals; guitar; piano; harmonica
- Years active: 2014–present
- Label: Hollywood
- Website: jordanfisherofficial.com

Jordan William Fisher (born April 24, 1994) is an American actor, singer, and dancer. He (Note: Fisher, as denoted on his Instagram account, uses both he/him and they/them pronouns. This article uses he/him for consistency.) began his career with recurring roles on several television series, including The Secret Life of the American Teenager in 2012 and Liv and Maddie from 2015 to 2017. He also had supporting roles in the television films Teen Beach Movie (2013), Teen Beach 2 (2015) as well as Grease Live (2016) and the CW series The Flash (2021–2022). He starred in Rent: Live (2019). He also played a part in the movie “Work It” .

On Broadway, Fisher portrayed John Laurens and Philip Hamilton in Hamilton from 2016 to 2017. He had the leading role of Evan Hansen in Dear Evan Hansen from 2020 to 2022. In 2023, he starred as Anthony Hope in a Broadway revival of Sweeney Todd: The Demon Barber of Fleet Street and later that year performed in the starring role of Orpheus in Hadestown until January 2025. He had a temporary engagement as Christian in Moulin Rouge! from April to July 2025.

Fisher and his dancing partner Lindsay Arnold won the 25th season of Dancing with the Stars (2017). He then hosted Dancing with the Stars: Juniors in 2018, and was a commentator for the 2019 Fortnite World Cup. As a singer, his self-titled EP was released by Hollywood Records in 2016. He starred in the 2020 Netflix films To All the Boys: P.S. I Still Love You and Work It and voiced Sea Hawk in She-Ra and the Princesses of Power.

== Early life and education ==
Jordan Fisher was born in Birmingham, Alabama, growing up in nearby Trussville to the east. His biological mother was 16 when he was born. He was legally adopted in 2005 at age 11 and grew up with his maternal grandparents, Rodney and Pat Fisher. Rodney and Pat Fisher also adopted Jordan's two siblings, Cory and Trinity, as their mother struggled with substance abuse—she did not have a relationship with the children. During an interview with Hollywood Today Live, Jordan revealed his multi-ethnic background of Nigerian, Cambodian, English, Polynesian (Tahitian), Italian, Greek, and Scandinavian origin.

Jordan Fisher began learning gymnastics at age 2. He started in musical theater in the fifth grade, after being cast in a school production of School House Rock, Jr. He was home-schooled as a child and earned a high school diploma from Harvest Christian Academy. He joined the Red Mountain Theatre Company in Birmingham and was part of their youth performing ensemble for many years. There he was spotted by a talent scout who offered to represent him. He enrolled in courses at Jacksonville State University in Jacksonville, Alabama in 2011. Later that year, he moved to Los Angeles with his grandparents and siblings.

== Career ==
In 2014, Fisher released three pop-soul songs on Radio Disney: "By Your Side", "Never Dance Alone" and "What I Got". In 2015, he signed a record deal with Hollywood Records. On January 31, 2016, he released "Counterfeit", as a promotional single on YouTube.

Fisher's first single, "All About Us", was released on April 15, 2016, and produced by Warren "Oak" Felder of the production duo Pop & Oak. The song's music video, directed by TK McKamy, premiered on Vibe.com on May 11, 2016. For the week of June 13, 2016, "All About Us" ranked as the second-most added song on pop radio stations. It is the first track on Fisher's self-titled EP, which was released on August 19, 2016. He has referred to the EP's sound as pop-soul-R&B, influenced by '80s soul music. Fisher plays six instruments: piano, guitar, bass, harmonica, French horn, and drums.

In 2015, Fisher joined Disney Channel Circle of Stars for a remake of the song "Do You Want to Build a Snowman?" from the film Frozen. For his role on Liv and Maddie, he sang both a duet and ballad version of the song "True Love", which appeared on the show's soundtrack in 2015. He contributed two tracks, "Fallin' for Ya" and "Wanna Be with You" to the Teen Beach 2 soundtrack; he performed vocals on three other songs on the album which was released in 2015. He is featured on Olivia Holt's 2016 debut EP Olivia on "Thin Air".

In 2015, Fisher voiced and motion captured the role of Matthew Taylor in the video game Until Dawn. He reprised his role in the 2024 remaster.

On March 13, 2016, he sang the national anthem before the NASCAR Good Sam 500 stock car race at the Phoenix International Raceway in Avondale, Arizona. At the 2016 Apple Music Festival in London, Fisher opened for Alicia Keys. He is featured alongside Lin-Manuel Miranda on "You're Welcome", an end-credits song for the 2016 animated Disney film Moana. In July 2016, he was picked as Elvis Duran's Artist of the Month and was featured on NBC's Today show hosted by Kathie Lee Gifford and Hoda Kotb where he performed live his single "All About Us". He covered the 1971 Ten Years After song "I'd Love to Change the World" for the 2017 ABC miniseries When We Rise. Fisher has performed at numerous WE Day concerts across the United States, to benefit WE Charity. His single "Mess" was released on October 6, 2017. In 2019, he released his single "Be Okay". In 2020, he released two singles, "Contact" and "Walking on the Ceiling". In December 2023, Fisher was a guest narrator at Disney's Candlelight Processional at Walt Disney World.

=== Television ===
Fisher's first television roles were in 2009 as a guest star on The Hustler on Crackle and iCarly on Nickelodeon. His first major part was as Grace Bowman (Megan Park)'s half-brother Jacob Bowman Gudina on seasons 4 and 5 of ABC Family's The Secret Life of the American Teenager. He portrayed the recurring character Holden Dippledorf on Liv and Maddie on the Disney Channel starting in 2015, and has also appeared in The Thundermans and Teen Wolf. He played the surfer gang leader Seacat in the cable TV movies Teen Beach Movie (2013) and Teen Beach 2 (2015). In Grease: Live!, a 2016 live performance of Grease televised on Fox, Fisher starred as Anthony "Doody" DelFuego, opposite Carly Rae Jepsen as his girlfriend Frenchy Facciano. He sang a rendition of "Those Magic Changes" which was praised as a highlight of the show. Soon after Grease: Live!, he appeared as Ian Johnson in "The Strike in the Chord", season 11 episode 16 of the popular crime TV series Bones. In September 2017, Fisher competed as a celebrity on the 25th season of Dancing with the Stars, paired with Lindsay Arnold. On November 21, they finished in first place and were declared the champions of the Mirrorball Trophy; Fisher also held the record of the youngest male winner on the show (age 23) until he was surpassed by Robert Irwin (age 21) in 2025.

From 2018 to 2020, Fisher voiced the character of Sea Hawk in She-Ra and the Princesses of Power. In 2019, Fisher appeared in another musical production on Fox, this time Rent: Live, as Mark Cohen. In 2020, he appeared on The Disney Family Singalong. On March 30, 2021, it was confirmed that Fisher would be portraying Bart Allen / Impulse on the CW superhero series, The Flash. He guest starred in High School Musical: The Musical: The Series, playing the role of Gina Porter (Sofia Wylie)'s older brother, Jamie Porter. From 2021 to 2022, he voiced MC Grillz, a famous rapper who is the host of a popular rapping competition, in the animated series Karma's World. In 2022, he voiced the lead character Wilbur in the HBO Max animated musical Naked Mole Rat Gets Dressed: The Underground Rock Experience. In 2024, he starred in The 5-Year Christmas Party on the Hallmark Channel.

=== Theater ===
Fisher made his Broadway debut in Hamilton on November 22, 2016, assuming the roles of John Laurens and Philip Hamilton from Anthony Ramos. His final performance was on March 5, 2017. In 2019, he participated in a workshop of MJ the Musical, playing the role of Michael Jackson. On January 28, 2020, he returned to Broadway, taking over the title role of Evan Hansen in the Tony Award-winning musical Dear Evan Hansen. He was the first actor of color to take on the role full time and won a Broadway.com Audience Choice Award for his performance. His final bow was on February 20, 2022. In February 2023, he started performances as Anthony Hope in a Broadway revival of Sweeney Todd: The Demon Barber of Fleet Street. He starred opposite Josh Groban as Sweeney Todd, Annaleigh Ashford as Mrs. Nellie Lovett, and Gaten Matarazzo as Tobias Ragg. His final performance was on June 18, 2023. He was replaced by former Hamilton star, Daniel Yearwood.

On October 10, 2023, it was announced that Fisher would take over the starring role of Orpheus in the Broadway cast of Hadestown, with his first performance on November 20, 2023. He replaced the final original leading cast member remaining, Reeve Carney in the role and received a Broadway.com Audience Choice Award for his portrayal. His final performance was on January 12, 2025. Throughout his run in the show he starred opposite Solea Pfeiffer, Lola Tung, Isa Briones, and Maia Reficco as his Eurydices. In February 2024, he was set to appear in a concert of Children of Eden as Cain and Japheth at David Geffen Hall in Lincoln Center. However he was replaced by Donald Webber Jr. Fisher also starred in the New York City Center Encores! production of Urinetown as Bobby Strong, which ran from February 5–16, 2025. On April 15, 2025, he began starring as Christian in the Broadway cast of Moulin Rouge! for a limited engagement set through July 20 of the same year, being the first African-American actor to portray the role on Broadway. Pfeiffer stars opposite him as Satine. On September 21, 2025, he took part in the 30th anniversary concert of Songs for A New World, composed by Jason Robert Brown, at the Eventim Apollo Haversmith.

On 6 March 2026, he joined the Off-Broadway revival cast of Little Shop of Horrors as Seymour Krelborn opposite Nikki M. James and Andy Karl. His final performance will be on July 19, after which Ethan Slater will take over the role.

=== Film ===
In 2019, Fisher was cast as John Ambrose McClaren in To All the Boys: P.S. I Still Love You. In 2020, he portrayed the role of Jake Taylor in the Netflix original movie Work It. In April 2021, it was announced that Fisher had been cast in the upcoming film Field Notes on Love as Hugo, starring alongside Liv and Maddie co-star Dove Cameron.

=== Other work ===
In 2026, Fisher voiced Raoul, Vicomte de Chagny in Erin A. Craig's audiobook Our Strange Duet (2026), a new reimagining and followup to Andrew Lloyd Webber's musical The Phantom of the Opera.

== Personal life ==
Fisher is married to his childhood sweetheart Ellie Woods. They announced their engagement on May 29, 2019, and were going to marry on July 25, 2020, but the wedding was delayed due to COVID-19. They married on November 21, 2020, in a private ceremony at Walt Disney World. In December 2021, the couple announced via Instagram that they were expecting their first child, a son. On June 7, 2022, the couple welcomed a son named Riley William. Fisher uses he/they pronouns.

== Discography ==
=== Soundtrack albums ===
Title	Album details
Rent: Live	Released: February 1, 2019; Formats: CD, digital download; Label: Sony Music Entertainment

=== Extended plays ===
Title	EP details	Peak chart positions
Title	EP details	US Heat.
Jordan Fisher	Released: August 19, 2016; Label: Hollywood; Formats: CD, Digital download, streaming	18

=== Singles ===
Year	Title	Peak chart positions				Album
Year	Title	US	US Pop	CAN	WW	Album
2016	"All About Us"	—	26	—	—	Jordan Fisher
2016	"Lookin' Like That"	—	39	—	—	Jordan Fisher
2017	"Always Summer"	—	—	—	—	Non-album singles
2017	"Happily Ever After" (with Angie Keilhauer)	—	—	—	—	Non-album singles
2017	"Mess"	—	—	—	—	Non-album singles
2019	"Be Okay"	—	—	—	—	Non-album singles
2019	"All I Want for Christmas Is Love" (with Julianne Hough)	—	—	—	—	Non-album singles
2020	"Contact"	—	—	—	—	Non-album singles
2020	"Walking on the Ceiling"	—	—	—	—	Non-album singles
2022	"Nobody Like U" (with 4*TOWN)	49	—	34	37	Turning Red (Original Motion Picture Soundtrack)

=== As featured artist ===
Year	Song	Album
2013	"It's Your Birthday" (Club Penguin featuring Jordan Fisher)	Non-album single
2020	"Make You Come True" (Royalties Cast featuring Jordan Fisher)	Royalties

=== Promotional singles ===
Year	Title	Album
2013	"By Your Side"	Non-album promotional singles
2014	"Never Dance Alone"	Non-album promotional singles
2014	"What I Got"	Non-album promotional singles
2014	"The Christmas Song"	Non-album promotional singles
2014	"This Christmas"	Non-album promotional singles
2016	"Counterfeit"	Jordan Fisher
2016	"The Christmas Song (Chestnuts Roasting on an Open Fire)"	A Hollywood Christmas
2017	"Come December"	A Hollywood Christmas
2018	"You've Got a Friend in Me" (with Olivia Holt)	Non-album promotional single
2021	"1949 (from The Flash Season 7)"	TBA
2022	"Everything I Ever Wanted"	TBA

=== Other charted songs ===
List of other charted songs, with selected chart positions, showing year released and album name
Year	Title	Peak chart positions		Album
Year	Title	US Bub.	US Kid	Album
2015	"Gotta Be Me" (with Ross Lynch, Maia Mitchell, Garrett Clayton, Grace Phipps and John DeLuca)	23	3	Teen Beach 2
2015	"Best Summer Ever" (with Ross Lynch, Maia Mitchell, Garrett Clayton, Grace Phipps, John DeLuca and Chrissie Fit)	—	5	Teen Beach 2
2015	"Falling for Ya" (with Chrissie Fit)	—	8	Teen Beach 2
2015	"Wanna Be With You"	—	13	Teen Beach 2
2015	"That's How We Do" (with Ross Lynch, Maia Mitchell, Garrett Clayton, Grace Phipps and John DeLuca)	—	4	Teen Beach 2
2016	"Those Magic Changes" (with Aaron Tveit)	—	—	Grease
2016	"You're Welcome" (with Lin-Manuel Miranda)	—	3	Moana

=== Other appearances ===
Year	Title	Other artist(s)	Album
2015	"True Love (Piano Duet)"	Dove Cameron	Liv and Maddie
2015	"True Love (Ballad)"	—N/a	Liv and Maddie
2016	"Summer Nights"	Grease: Live! cast	Grease Live!
2016	"Thin Air"	Olivia Holt	Olivia
2017	"I'd Love to Change the World"	—N/a	When We Rise
2022	"1 True Love"	Finneas O'Connell, Josh Levi, Topher Ngo & Grayson Villanueva	Turning Red
2022	"U Know What's Up"	Finneas O'Connell, Josh Levi, Topher Ngo & Grayson Villanueva	Turning Red

=== Music videos ===
Year	Title	Director
2014	"The Christmas Song"	
2014	"This Christmas"	
2016	"All About Us"	
2017	"I'd Love to Change the World"	
2017	"You're Welcome"	
2017	"Always Summer"	
2017	"Happily Ever After"	
2017	"Mess"	
2019	"All I Want for Christmas Is Love"	designedmemory
2019	"Be Okay"	Jordan Fisher
2020	"Contact"	Fisher
2020	"Walking on the Ceiling"	Fisher
2020	"Make You Come True"	Darren Criss

== Filmography ==
Television roles
Year	Title	Role	Notes
2009	The Hustler	Mario	Episode: "Hustle & Bustle"
2009	iCarly	Clark	Episode: "iSpeed Date"
2009	Skyrunners Testimonials	Johnny	Episode: "Press Conference – ATV"
2012	The Secret Life of the American Teenager	Jacob Bowman Gudina	9 episodes
2013	Teen Beach Movie	Seacat	Disney Channel Original Movie
2014	The Thundermans	Dylan	Episode: "Four Supes and a Baby"
2015	The Chew	Himself	Episode: "Movie Night"
2015–2017	Liv and Maddie	Holden Dippledorf	11 episodes
2015–2016	Teen Wolf	Noah Patrick	2 episodes
2015	Teen Beach 2	Seacat	Disney Channel Original Movie
2016	Bones	Ian Johnson	Episode: "The Strike in the Chord"
2016	Grease: Live	Anthony "Doody" DelFuego	Television special
2016	Stay	Miles	Unsold Pilot
2017	Dancing with the Stars	Himself	Winner on season 25
2018–2020	She-Ra and the Princesses of Power	Sea Hawk (voice)	Animated series
2018	Dancing with the Stars: Juniors	Himself	Host
2019	Rent: Live	Mark Cohen	Television special
2019–2021	Archibald's Next Big Thing	Finly Strutter (voice)	Main role (23 episodes)
2020	The Disney Family Singalong	Himself	Television special
2020	Butterbean's Cafe	Zane Gray (voice)	Episode: "I Love Rockin' Rolls/A Baby At Marmalade's"
2020	Royalties	Kissgo Muah	Episode: "Make You Come (True)"
2021–2022	The Flash	Bart Allen / Impulse	6 episodes
2021	It's Pony	Barrington (voice)	Episode: "Pony Car/Wedding Planners"
2021	High School Musical: The Musical: The Series	Jamie Porter	Episode: "Showtime"
2021	Robot Chicken	Statue of David (voice)	Episode: "May Cause One Year of Orange Poop"
2021	Star Wars: Visions	Dan G'vash (voice)	Episode: "The Elder": English language dub
2021	Karma's World	MC Grillz (voice)	3 episodes
2022	Naked Mole Rat Gets Dressed: The Underground Rock Experience	Wilbur (voice)	Main role
2022	Alpha Betas	Captain Whaler	Episode: "The Filthy Password"
2024	The 5-Year Christmas Party	Max	TV movie

Films
Year	Title	Role	Notes
2020	To All the Boys: P.S. I Still Love You	John Ambrose McClaren	
2020	Work It	Jake Taylor	
2022	Turning Red	Robaire	Voice role
2022	Hello, Goodbye, and Everything in Between	Aidan	

Video games
Year	Title	Role	Notes
2015, 2024	Until Dawn	Matthew "Matt" Taylor	Voice and Motion Capture performance

Theme Park Attractions
Year	Title	Role	Notes
2017	Happily Ever After	Male Vocalist	Performed the song Happily Ever After with Angie Keilhauer

== Stage credits ==
Year(s)	Production	Role	Location	Category
2016	Grease	Anthony "Doody" DelFuego	Warner Bros. Studios	Television special of live production
2016–2017	Hamilton	John Laurens / Philip Hamilton (replacement)	Richard Rodgers Theatre	Broadway
2019	Rent	Mark Cohen	Fox Studios	Television special of partially live production
2019	MJ the Musical	Michael Jackson	Unknown	Workshop
2020	Dear Evan Hansen	Evan Hansen (replacement)	Music Box Theatre	Broadway
2021	Freestyle Love Supreme	Special Spontaneous Guest Performer	Booth Theatre	Broadway
2021–2022	Dear Evan Hansen	Evan Hansen (replacement)	Music Box Theatre	Broadway
2023	Sweeney Todd: The Demon Barber of Fleet Street	Anthony Hope	Lunt-Fontanne Theatre	Broadway
2023	Gutenberg! The Musical!	The Producer (One night cameo)	James Earl Jones Theatre	Broadway
2023–2025	Hadestown	Orpheus (replacement)	Walter Kerr Theatre	Broadway
2025	Urinetown	Bobby Strong	New York City Center	Off-Broadway
2025	Moulin Rouge! The Musical	Christian (replacement)	Al Hirschfeld Theatre	Broadway
2025	Songs for a New World	Man #2	Hammersmith Apollo	30th Anniversary Concert
2026	Little Shop of Horrors	Seymour Krelborn (replacement)	Westside Theatre	Off-Broadway
2027	Purple Rain	The Kid	Majestic Theatre	Broadway

== Advertisements ==
Year	Company	Title
2017	Fanta	"The Fantanas: Dancing in the Street"
2020	Domino's Pizza	"Delivery Business"
2021	Blizzard Entertainment	"An Ode to Returning Heroes"

== Awards and nominations ==
Year	Award	Category	Work	Result
2015	Teen Choice Awards	Choice Song from a Movie or TV Show	"Gotta Be Me"	Nominated
2017	Radio Disney Music Awards	Best New Artist	Himself	Nominated
2024	Broadway.com Audience Choice Awards	Favorite Replacement (Male)	Hadestown	Won
2025	Broadway.com Audience Choice Awards	Favorite Replacement (Male)	Moulin Rogue!	Nominated

Awards and achievements
Preceded by Rashad Jennings & Emma Slater	Dancing with the Stars (US) winners Season 25 (Fall 2017 with Lindsay Arnold)	Succeeded by Adam Rippon and Jenna Johnson
