= 2015 Teen Choice Awards =

American awards ceremony held in California

- Date: August 16, 2015
- Location: Galen Center, Los Angeles, California
- Hosted by: Josh Peck; Gina Rodriguez; Ludacris

Television/radio coverage
- Network: Fox
- Produced by: Paul Flattery (supervising); Kelly Brock (supervising); Greg Sills (supervising); Bob Bain (executive); Michael Burg (executive)

The 2015 Teen Choice Awards ceremony was held on August 16, 2015, at the Galen Center in Los Angeles, California. The awards celebrate the year's achievements in music, film, television, sports, fashion, comedy, video games, and the Internet, and were voted on by viewers living in the US, aged 13 and over, through various social media sites.

One Direction were the biggest winners of the night, winning eight of their ten nominations. Pretty Little Liars came in second by winning six of its ten nominations and Pitch Perfect 2 came in third, winning five of its ten nominations. Britney Spears was awarded with the "Candie's Choice Style Icon".

== Performers ==
- 5 Seconds of Summer — "She's Kinda Hot"
- Little Mix — "Black Magic"
- Jussie Smollett and Bryshere Y. Gray from Empire cast.
- Rachel Platten — "Fight Song"
- Flo Rida featuring Robin Thicke — "I Don't Like It, I Love It"

== Presenters ==
- Sarah Hyland & Skylar Astin • Presented Choice Comedian
- Keke Palmer, Emma Roberts and Lea Michele • Presented Choice Sci-Fi/Fantasy Movie Actor
- Wiz Khalifa and Michelle Rodriguez • Presented Choice Breakout TV Show
- Bethany Mota and Laura Marano • Presented Choice Music Web Star
- Zendaya • Introduced Little Mix
- Rita Ora and Scott Eastwood • Presented Choice Drama Movie Actress
- Fifth Harmony • Presented Candie's Choice Style Icon
- Maia Mitchell & Lucy Hale • Presented Choice Male Athlete
- Cat Deeley & Jason Derulo • Presented Choice R&B/Hip-Hop Song & Choice Dancer
- Victoria Justice & Jake T. Austin • Presented Choice Sci-Fi/Fantasy TV Actress
- Terry Crews and Wilmer Valderrama • Presented Choice Action Movie
- Tyler Oakley and Bea Miller • Presented Choice Drama TV Show
- The Janoskians • Introduced One Direction
- R5 • Presented Choice Summer Song
- Gregg Sulkin & Bella Thorne • Presented Choice Male Web Star & Choice Female Web Star

== Theme song ==
Fans had the power to choose the official theme song for the show from July 24 through August 14, 2015. Zedd feat. Selena Gomez's "I Want You to Know" was chosen as the year's theme song.

== Winners and nominees ==
The first wave of nominations were announced on June 9, 2015. The second wave was announced on July 8, 2015. The third wave was announced on July 30, 2015. Winners are listed first and highlighted in bold text.

=== Movies ===
Choice Movie: Action	Choice Movie Actor: Action
**Furious 7**; The Divergent Series: Insurgent; Kingsman: The Secret Service; The Maze Runner; San Andreas; Tracers	**Paul Walker (Note: Walker was posthumously nominated.) (Brian O'Conner) – Furious 7**; Vin Diesel (Dominic Toretto) – Furious 7; Ansel Elgort (Caleb) – The Divergent Series: Insurgent; Theo James (Four) – The Divergent Series: Insurgent; Taylor Lautner (Cam) – Tracers; Dylan O'Brien (Thomas) – The Maze Runner
Choice Movie Actress: Action	Choice Movie: Sci-Fi/Fantasy
**Shailene Woodley (Tris) – The Divergent Series: Insurgent**; Jordana Brewster (Mia Toretto) – Furious 7; Alexandra Daddario (Blake) – San Andreas; Maggie Grace (Kim Mills) – Taken 3; Michelle Rodriguez (Letty Ortiz) – Furious 7; Kaya Scodelario (Teresa) – The Maze Runner	**The Hunger Games: Mockingjay – Part 1**; Avengers: Age of Ultron; Cinderella; The Hobbit: The Battle of the Five Armies; Mad Max: Fury Road; Tomorrowland
Choice Movie Actor: Sci-Fi/Fantasy	Choice Movie Actress: Sci-Fi/Fantasy
**Josh Hutcherson (Peeta Mellark) – The Hunger Games: Mockingjay – Part 1**; George Clooney (Frank Walker) – Tomorrowland; Robert Downey Jr. (Tony Stark/Iron Man) – Avengers: Age of Ultron; Chris Hemsworth (Thor) – Avengers: Age of Ultron; Liam Hemsworth (Gale Hawthorne) – The Hunger Games: Mockingjay – Part 1; Channing Tatum (Caine Wise) – Jupiter Ascending	**Jennifer Lawrence (Katniss Everdeen) – The Hunger Games: Mockingjay – Part 1**; Mackenzie Foy (Young Murph) – Interstellar; Lily James (Cinderella) – Cinderella; Scarlett Johansson (Natasha Romanoff/Black Widow) – Avengers: Age of Ultron; Mila Kunis (Jupiter Jones) – Jupiter Ascending; Britt Robertson (Casey Newton) – Tomorrowland
Choice Movie: Drama	Choice Movie Actor: Drama
**If I Stay**; The Age of Adaline; Fury; The Longest Ride; McFarland, USA; The Theory of Everything	**Scott Eastwood (Luke Collins) – The Longest Ride**; James Franco (Christian Longo) – True Story; Chris Hemsworth (Nicholas Hathaway) – Blackhat; Jonah Hill (Michael Finkel) – True Story; Logan Lerman (Norman Ellison) – Fury; Eddie Redmayne (Stephen Hawking) – The Theory of Everything
Choice Movie Actress: Drama	Choice Movie: Comedy
**Chloë Grace Moretz (Mia Hall) – If I Stay**; Felicity Jones (Jane Hawking; Jill Barker) – The Theory of Everything & True Story; Blake Lively (Adaline Bowman) – The Age of Adaline; Britt Robertson (Sophia Danko) – The Longest Ride; Kristen Stewart (Lydia) – Still Alice; Reese Witherspoon (Cheryl Strayed) – Wild	**Pitch Perfect 2**; Aloha; The DUFF; Dumb and Dumber To; Night at the Museum: Secret of the Tomb; Paul Blart: Mall Cop 2
Choice Movie Actor: Comedy	Choice Movie Actress: Comedy
**Skylar Astin (Jesse) – Pitch Perfect 2**; Robbie Amell (Wesley) – The DUFF; Jim Carrey (Lloyd) – Dumb and Dumber To; Bradley Cooper (Brian Gilcrest) – Aloha; Kevin James (Paul Blart) – Paul Blart: Mall Cop 2; Ben Stiller (Larry Daley) – Night at the Museum: Secret of the Tomb	**Anna Kendrick (Beca) – Pitch Perfect 2**; Raini Rodriguez (Maya Blart) – Paul Blart: Mall Cop 2; Emma Stone (Allison Ng) – Aloha; Mae Whitman (Bianca) – The DUFF; Rebel Wilson (Fat Amy) – Pitch Perfect 2; Reese Witherspoon (Cooper) – Hot Pursuit
Choice Movie: Villain	Choice Movie: Scene Stealer
**Bella Thorne (Madison) – The DUFF**; Rose Byrne (Rayna Boyanov) – Spy; Vincent D'Onofrio (Hoskins) – Jurassic World; Jason Statham (Deckard Shaw) – Furious 7; Donald Sutherland (President Snow) – The Hunger Games: Mockingjay – Part 1; Kate Winslet (Jeanine) – The Divergent Series: Insurgent	**Chris Evans (Steve Rogers/Captain America) – Avengers: Age of Ultron**; Adam DeVine (Bumper) – Pitch Perfect 2; Green Bay Packers – Pitch Perfect 2; Nicholas Hoult (Nux) – Mad Max: Fury Road; Hailee Steinfeld (Emily) – Pitch Perfect 2; Miles Teller (Peter) – The Divergent Series: Insurgent
Choice Movie: Breakout Star	Choice Movie: Chemistry
**Cara Delevingne (Margo Roth Spiegelman) – Paper Towns**; Thomas Brodie-Sangster (Newt) – The Maze Runner; Scott Eastwood (Luke Collins) – The Longest Ride; Taron Egerton (Gary "Eggsy" Unwin) – Kingsman: The Secret Service; Thomas Mann (Greg) – Me and Earl and the Dying Girl; Elizabeth Olsen (Wanda Maximoff/Scarlet Witch) – Avengers: Age of Ultron	**Anna Kendrick & Brittany Snow – Pitch Perfect 2**; Jim Carrey & Jeff Daniels – Dumb and Dumber To; Vin Diesel, Paul Walker (Note: Walker was posthumously nominated.), Dwayne Johnson, Michelle Rodriguez, Tyrese Gibson, & Ludacris – Furious 7; Thomas Mann & RJ Cyler – Me and Earl and the Dying Girl; Dylan O'Brien & Thomas Brodie-Sangster – The Maze Runner; Reese Witherspoon & Sofía Vergara – Hot Pursuit
Choice Movie: Liplock	Choice Movie: Hissy Fit
**Shailene Woodley & Theo James – The Divergent Series: Allegiant**; Jennifer Lawrence & Liam Hemsworth – The Hunger Games: Mockingjay – Part 1; Blake Lively & Michiel Huisman – The Age of Adaline; Mae Whitman & Robbie Amell – The DUFF; Rebel Wilson & Adam DeVine – Pitch Perfect 2; Reese Witherspoon & Sofía Vergara – Hot Pursuit	**Anna Kendrick – Pitch Perfect 2**; Lewis Black – Inside Out; Bryce Dallas Howard – Jurassic World; Melissa McCarthy – Spy; Reese Witherspoon – Hot Pursuit; Charlie Day - Horrible Bosses 2
Choice Movie: Summer
**Paper Towns**; Inside Out; Jurassic World; Me and Earl and the Dying Girl; Spy; Terminator Genisys
Choice Movie Actor: Summer	Choice Movie Actress: Summer
**Channing Tatum (Magic Mike) – Magic Mike XXL**; Dwayne Johnson (Ray) – San Andreas; Chris Pratt (Owen) – Jurassic World; Paul Rudd (Scott Lang/Ant-Man) – Ant-Man; Adam Sandler (Sam Brenner) – Pixels; Nat Wolff (Quentin Jacobsen) – Paper Towns	**Cara Delevingne (Margo Roth Spiegelman) – Paper Towns**; Emilia Clarke (Sarah Connor) – Terminator Genisys; Bryce Dallas Howard (Claire) – Jurassic World; Evangeline Lilly (Hope van Dyne) – Ant-Man; Melissa McCarthy (Susan Cooper) – Spy; Amy Poehler (voice of Joy) – Inside Out

=== Television ===
Choice TV Show: Drama	Choice TV Actor: Drama
**Pretty Little Liars**; Castle; Empire; The Fosters; Grey's Anatomy; Nashville	**Ian Harding (Ezra Fitz) – Pretty Little Liars**; Keegan Allen (Toby Cavanaugh) – Pretty Little Liars; Jake T. Austin (Jesus Foster) – The Fosters; Nathan Fillion (Richard Castle) – Castle; Terrence Howard (Lucious Lyon) – Empire; Jussie Smollett (Jamal Lyon) – Empire
Choice TV Actress: Drama	Choice TV Show: Sci-Fi/Fantasy
**Lucy Hale (Aria Montgomery) – Pretty Little Liars**; Taraji P. Henson (Cookie Lyon) – Empire; Maia Mitchell (Callie) – The Fosters; Shay Mitchell (Emily Fields) – Pretty Little Liars; Hayden Panettiere (Juliette Barnes) – Nashville; Kerry Washington (Olivia Pope) – Scandal	**The Vampire Diaries**; The 100; Agents of S.H.I.E.L.D.; Arrow; Once Upon a Time; Sleepy Hollow
Choice TV Actor: Sci-Fi/Fantasy	Choice TV Actress: Sci-Fi/Fantasy
**Jared Padalecki (Sam Winchester) – Supernatural**; Stephen Amell (Oliver Queen) – Arrow; Joseph Morgan (Klaus Mikaelson) – The Originals; Bob Morley (Bellamy Blake) – The 100; Ian Somerhalder (Damon Salvatore) – The Vampire Diaries; Paul Wesley (Stefan Salvatore) – The Vampire Diaries	**Nina Dobrev (Elena Gilbert) – The Vampire Diaries**; Candice Accola (Caroline) – The Vampire Diaries; Jennifer Morrison (Emma Swan) – Once Upon a Time; Danielle Panabaker (Caitlin Snow) – The Flash; Emily Bett Rickards (Felicity Smoak) – Arrow; Eliza Taylor (Clarke Griffin) – The 100
Choice TV Show: Comedy	Choice TV Actor: Comedy
**The Big Bang Theory**; Austin & Ally; Awkward; Girl Meets World; New Girl; Young & Hungry	**Ross Lynch (Austin) – Austin & Ally**; Anthony Anderson (Andre "Dre" Johnson) – Black-ish; Jaime Camil (Rogelio) – Jane the Virgin; Chris Colfer (Kurt Hummel) – Glee; Jim Parsons (Sheldon Cooper) – The Big Bang Theory; Andy Samberg (Jake Peralta) – Brooklyn Nine-Nine
Choice TV Actress: Comedy	Choice TV Show: Animated
**Lea Michele (Rachel Berry) – Glee**; Dove Cameron (Liv/Maddie) – Liv and Maddie; Kaley Cuoco-Sweeting (Penny) – The Big Bang Theory; Emily Osment (Gabi Diamond) – Young & Hungry; Gina Rodriguez (Jane Villanueva) – Jane the Virgin; Zendaya (K.C. Cooper) – K.C. Undercover	**Family Guy**; Adventure Time; Gravity Falls; Regular Show; The Simpsons; Star Wars Rebels
Choice TV: Reality Show	Choice TV: Villain
**The Voice**; American Idol; Dance Moms; Keeping Up with the Kardashians; Lip Sync Battle; MasterChef Junior	**Vanessa Ray (CeCe Drake) – Pretty Little Liars**; Tom Cavanagh (Harrison Wells/Reverse Flash) – The Flash; Terrence Howard (Lucious Lyon) – Empire; Marti Matulis, Douglas Tait, & Caitlin Dechelle (The Dread Doctors) – Teen Wolf; Matt Nable (Ra's al Ghul) – Arrow; Chris Wood (Kai) – The Vampire Diaries
Choice TV: Scene Stealer	Choice TV: Breakout Star
**Dylan O'Brien (Stiles Stilinski) – Teen Wolf**; Trai Byers (Andre Lyon) – Empire; Kat Graham (Bonnie) – The Vampire Diaries; Sasha Pieterse (Alison DiLaurentis) – Pretty Little Liars; Bella Thorne (Nina Patterson) – Scream; Ashley Tisdale (Logan Rawlings) – Young & Hungry	**Grant Gustin (Barry Allen/The Flash) – The Flash**; Bryshere Y. Gray (Hakeem Lyon) – Empire; Candice Patton (Iris West) – The Flash; Gina Rodriguez (Jane Villanueva) – Jane the Virgin; Yara Shahidi (Zoey Johnson) – Black-ish; Jussie Smollett (Jamal Lyon) – Empire
Choice TV Show: Breakout	Choice TV: Chemistry
**Empire**; Becoming Us; Black-ish; iZombie; Jane the Virgin; Younger	**Jensen Ackles & Misha Collins – Supernatural**; Johnny Galecki, Jim Parsons, Kaley Cuoco-Sweeting, Simon Helberg, & Kunal Nayyar – The Big Bang Theory; Grant Gustin & Candice Patton – The Flash; Terrence Howard, Taraji P. Henson, Jussie Smollett, Trai Byers, & Bryshere Y. Gray – Empire; Ross Lynch & Laura Marano – Austin & Ally; Ian Somerhalder & Kat Graham – The Vampire Diaries
Choice TV: Liplock	Choice TV Show: Summer
**Nina Dobrev & Ian Somerhalder – The Vampire Diaries**; Stephen Amell & Emily Bett Rickards – Arrow; Grant Gustin & Candice Patton – The Flash; Jennifer Morrison & Colin O'Donoghue – Once Upon a Time; Gina Rodriguez & Justin Baldoni – Jane the Virgin; Paul Wesley & Candice Accola – The Vampire Diaries	**Teen Wolf**; Baby Daddy; Chasing Life; Faking It; Scream; So You Think You Can Dance
Choice TV Actor: Summer	Choice TV Actress: Summer
**Tyler Blackburn (Caleb Rivers) – Pretty Little Liars**; David Lambert (Brandon Foster) – The Fosters; Ross Lynch (Brady) – Teen Beach 2; Tyler Posey (Scott McCall) – Teen Wolf; Gregg Sulkin (Liam) – Faking It; Mike Vogel (Dale "Barbie" Barbara) – Under the Dome	**Ashley Benson (Hanna Marin) – Pretty Little Liars**; Troian Bellisario (Spencer Hastings) – Pretty Little Liars; Willa Fitzgerald (Emma Duvall) – Scream; Laura Marano (Ally) – Austin & Ally; Maia Mitchell (McKenzie) – Teen Beach 2; Italia Ricci (April Carver) – Chasing Life

=== Music ===
Choice Music: Male Artist	Choice Music: Female Artist
**Ed Sheeran**; Jason Derulo; Nick Jonas; Shawn Mendes; Pitbull; Sam Smith	**Demi Lovato**; Iggy Azalea; Selena Gomez; Ariana Grande; Rihanna; Taylor Swift
Choice Music Group: Male	Choice Music Group: Female
**One Direction**; 5 Seconds of Summer; Fall Out Boy; Imagine Dragons; Maroon 5; OneRepublic	**Fifth Harmony**; Barden Bellas; Cimorelli; Haim; Icona Pop; Little Mix
Choice Music: R&B/Hip-Hop Artist	Choice Music: Country Artist
**Nicki Minaj**; Iggy Azalea; Drake; The Weeknd; Kanye West; Wiz Khalifa	**Carrie Underwood**; Luke Bryan; Florida Georgia Line; Hunter Hayes; Miranda Lambert; Blake Shelton
Choice Music Single: Male Artist	Choice Music Single: Female Artist
**"Thinking Out Loud" – Ed Sheeran**; "Jealous" – Nick Jonas; "Lay Me Down" – Sam Smith; "Stitches" – Shawn Mendes; "Uptown Funk" – Mark Ronson feat. Bruno Mars; "Where Are Ü Now" – Jack Ü and Justin Bieber	**"One Last Time" – Ariana Grande**; "All About That Bass" – Meghan Trainor; "Bang Bang" – Jessie J, Ariana Grande, & Nicki Minaj; "Heartbeat Song" – Kelly Clarkson; "Pretty Girls" – Britney Spears & Iggy Azalea; "Shake It Off" – Taylor Swift
Choice Music Single: Group	Choice Music: International Artist
**"Steal My Girl" – One Direction**; "Centuries" – Fall Out Boy; "Cool Kids" – Echosmith; "Sugar" – Maroon 5; "What I Like About You" – 5 Seconds of Summer; "Worth It" – Fifth Harmony feat. Kid Ink	**Super Junior**; 2NE1; 5 Seconds of Summer; Girls' Generation; Little Mix; One Direction
Choice Music: Country Song	Choice Music: R&B/Hip-Hop Song
**"Little Toy Guns" – Carrie Underwood**; "21" – Hunter Hayes; "Kick the Dust Up" – Luke Bryan; "Sippin' on Fire" – Florida Georgia Line; "Take Your Time" – Sam Hunt; "That Ghost" – Megan and Liz	**"See You Again" – Wiz Khalifa feat. Charlie Puth**; "Better Have My Money" – Rihanna; "Earned It" – The Weeknd; "FourFiveSeconds" – Rihanna, Kanye West and Paul McCartney; "I Don't Like It, I Love It" – Flo Rida feat. Robin Thicke and Verdine White; "Watch Me (Whip/Nae Nae)" – Silentó
Choice Music: Rock Song	Choice Music: Love Song
**"Take Me to Church" – Hozier**; "Budapest" – George Ezra; "I Bet My Life" – Imagine Dragons; "Renegades" – X Ambassadors; "Tear in My Heart" – Twenty One Pilots; "Uma Thurman" – Fall Out Boy	**"Night Changes" – One Direction**; "Black Magic" – Little Mix; "Earned It" – The Weeknd; "Sledgehammer" – Fifth Harmony; "Sugar" – Maroon 5; "Thinking Out Loud" – Ed Sheeran
Choice Music: Break-Up Song	Choice Music: Party Song
**"Bad Blood" – Taylor Swift feat. Kendrick Lamar**; "Don't" – Ed Sheeran; "Ex's & Oh's" – Elle King; "The Heart Wants What It Wants" – Selena Gomez; "Lips Are Movin" – Meghan Trainor; "Where Are Ü Now" – Jack Ü and Justin Bieber	**"No Control" – One Direction**; "Better Have My Money" – Rihanna; "Blank Space" – Taylor Swift; "I Want You to Know" – Zedd feat. Selena Gomez; "Shut Up and Dance" – Walk the Moon; "Uptown Funk" – Mark Ronson feat. Bruno Mars
Choice Music: Breakout Artist	Choice Music: Next Big Thing
**Little Mix**; Andy Grammer; Tove Lo; Rachel Platten; Meghan Trainor; The Weeknd	**Bea Miller**; Clark Beckham; Kalin and Myles; Skate Maloley; Neon Jungle; Spring King
Choice Music: Collaboration	Choice Music: Song from a Movie or TV Show
**"Bad Blood" – Taylor Swift feat. Kendrick Lamar**; "Hey Mama" – David Guetta feat. Nicki Minaj, Bebe Rexha, & Afrojack; "Pretty Girls" – Britney Spears & Iggy Azalea; "See You Again" – Wiz Khalifa feat. Charlie Puth; "Uptown Funk" – Mark Ronson feat. Bruno Mars; "Where Are Ü Now" – Jack Ü & Justin Bieber	**"See You Again" from Furious 7 – Wiz Khalifa feat. Charlie Puth**; "Believe" from Descendants – Shawn Mendes; "Flashlight" from Pitch Perfect 2 – Jessie J; "Gotta Be Me" from Teen Beach 2 – Ross Lynch, Maia Mitchell, Garrett Clayton, Grace Phipps, John DeLuca, & Jordan Fisher; "Love Me like You Do" from Fifty Shades of Grey – Ellie Goulding; "You're So Beautiful" from Empire – Jussie Smollett & Bryshere Y. Gray
Choice Music: Summer Song	Choice Summer Music Artist: Male
**"Worth It" – Fifth Harmony feat. Kid Ink**; "Bad Blood" – Taylor Swift feat. Kendrick Lamar; "Cheerleader" – OMI; "Cool for the Summer" – Demi Lovato; "Fight Song" – Rachel Platten; "Good for You" – Selena Gomez feat. ASAP Rocky	**Ed Sheeran**; Justin Bieber; Jason Derulo; Andy Grammer; Shawn Mendes; The Weeknd
Choice Summer Music Artist: Female	Choice Music: Summer Group
**Taylor Swift**; Selena Gomez; Ariana Grande; Demi Lovato; Nicki Minaj; Rihanna	**One Direction**; 5 Seconds of Summer; Echosmith; Fifth Harmony; Little Mix; Maroon 5
Choice Music: Summer Tour
**One Direction – On the Road Again Tour**; 5 Seconds of Summer – Rock Out with Your Socks Out Tour; Fall Out Boy & Wiz Khalifa – Boys of Zummer Tour; Ariana Grande – The Honeymoon Tour; Ed Sheeran – x Tour; Taylor Swift – The 1989 World Tour

=== Fashion ===
Choice Hottie: Male	Choice Hottie: Female
**One Direction**; 5 Seconds of Summer; Justin Bieber; Ryan Guzman; Austin Mahone; Zayn Malik	**Fifth Harmony**; Miley Cyrus; Cara Delevingne; Selena Gomez; Rihanna; Taylor Swift

=== Sports ===
Choice Athlete: Male	Choice Athlete: Female
**Stephen Curry**; American Pharoah and Victor Espinoza; Tom Brady; LeBron James; Cristiano Ronaldo; Jordan Spieth	**U.S. Women's National Soccer Team**; The Bella Twins; Simone Biles; Danica Patrick; Ronda Rousey; Serena Williams

=== Digital ===
Choice Web Star: Male	Choice Web Star: Female
**Cameron Dallas**; Matthew Espinosa; Joey Graceffa; Ryan Higa; Tyler Oakley; PewDiePie	**Bethany Mota**; Eva Gutowski; Grace Helbig; Jenn McAllister; Michelle Phan; Lele Pons
Choice Web Star: Comedy	Choice Web Star: Music
**Miranda Sings**; Dude Perfect; Nash Grier; The Janoskians; Josh Peck; Lilly Singh	**Shawn Mendes**; Christina Grimmie; Jack & Jack; Tori Kelly; Lindsey Stirling; Sam Tsui
Choice Web Star: Fashion/Beauty	Choice Social Media King
**Zoella**; Andrea Brooks; Rachel Levin; Bethany Mota; Ingrid Nilsen; Michelle Phan	**Justin Bieber**; Jimmy Fallon; LeBron James; Bruno Mars; Pitbull; Justin Timberlake
Choice Social Media Queen	Choice Twit
**Caitlyn Jenner**; Miley Cyrus; Selena Gomez; Nicki Minaj; Katy Perry; Taylor Swift	**Taylor Swift**; Justin Bieber; Lady Gaga; Katy Perry; Shakira; Justin Timberlake
Choice Viner	Choice Instagrammer
**Cameron Dallas**; Matthew Espinosa; Brittany Furlan; Logan Paul; Josh Peck; Lele Pons	**Ariana Grande**; Beyoncé; Justin Bieber; Selena Gomez; Kylie Jenner; Kim Kardashian
Choice YouTuber	Choice Fandom
**Kian Lawley**; Connor Franta; Jenna Marbles; Bethany Mota; Tyler Oakley; Lilly Singh	**Super Junior**; 5 Seconds of Summer; Fifth Harmony; Lady Gaga; Demi Lovato; One Direction

=== Miscellaneous ===
Choice Comedian	Choice Dancer
**Ellen DeGeneres**; Jimmy Fallon; Kevin Hart; Jimmy Kimmel; George Lopez; Amy Schumer	**Chloe Lukasiak**; Stephen "tWitch" Boss; Allison Holker; Derek Hough; Les Twins; Maddie Ziegler
Choice Model	Choice Selfie Taker
**Kendall Jenner**; Hailey Baldwin; Cara Delevingne; Gigi Hadid; Karlie Kloss; Robyn Lawley	**One Direction**; Justin Bieber; Kylie Jenner; Kim Kardashian; Rihanna; Nicole Scherzinger
