= OFC Creations =

American performing arts organization

OFC Creations is a performing arts organization founded by Eric Vaughn Johnson in 2005, based in Brighton, New York, a suburb of Rochester, New York. It operates a performing arts center, the OFC Creations Theatre Center, where the organization produces professional theatre and runs youth theatre education programs. It also operates a café, rents costumes, sets, and puppets to other theatre groups, and rents its spaces for private events.

== History ==
OFC Creations Theatre Center
- Exterior of OFC Creations Theatre Center in 2026
- Location: 3450 Winton Place, Brighton, New York
- Capacity: 260

Construction
- Opened: 2020

Website
- https://www.ofccreations.com

OFC was founded as OFC Videos in 2005, and solely produced films and cabaret events until it began producing musical theatre as OFC Creations in 2011. OFC is an acronym for "Opportunities for Creativity." In a February 2019 interview with News 8 WROC, Johnson said that he and others wanted to get involved with theatre and film and to create their own opportunities.

It staged productions at venues including Nazareth University, Lyric Theatre, Kodak Center, School of the Arts, and the Rochester Museum and Science Center, before opening the OFC Creations Theatre Center in July 2020.

== Broadway in Brighton ==
In 2023, OFC launched Broadway in Brighton, a series of professional musicals featuring national talent alongside regional performers. Productions in the series that received press coverage include:

- The Rocky Horror Show (2023), with Garrett Clayton
- Gypsy (2025), with Jodi Benson
- Anything Goes (2025), with Kel Mitchell
- Finding Neverland (2025), with Ross "Rosé" McCorkell
- Dr. Seuss' How The Grinch Stole Christmas! The Musical (2025), with Garrett Clayton
- Hello, Dolly! (2026), with Elaine Hendrix
