= Staten Island Summer =

- Digital download poster
- Directed by: Rhys Thomas
- Written by: Colin Jost
- Produced by: John Goldwyn; Lorne Michaels
- Starring: Graham Phillips; Zack Pearlman; Ashley Greene; Bobby Moynihan; Cecily Strong; Jim Gaffigan; Gina Gershon; Vincent Pastore; Kate Walsh
- Cinematography: Anthony Wolberg
- Edited by: Steve Edwards; Adam Epstein
- Music by: John Swihart
- Production companies: Michaels-Goldwyn; Broadway Video
- Distributed by: Paramount Pictures
- Release date: June 30, 2015
- Running time: 107 minutes
- Country: United States
- Language: English

Staten Island Summer is a 2015 American comedy film directed by Rhys Thomas and written by Colin Jost. The film stars Graham Phillips, Zack Pearlman, John DeLuca, Bobby Moynihan, Will Forte, Fred Armisen, Cecily Strong, Owen Benjamin and Ashley Greene. It was released for digital download on June 30, 2015, by Paramount Pictures.

== Plot ==
The film follows Danny and Frank's last summer together before college. They are both working as lifeguards and trying to find summer hook ups. With a troubling setback they still manage to throw an end-of-the-summer party.

== Cast ==
- Graham Phillips as Danny Campbell
- Zack Pearlman as Frank Gomes
- John DeLuca as Anthony
- Bobby Moynihan as Skootch
- Mike O'Brien as Chuck
- Will Forte as Griffith
- Fred Armisen as Victor
- Cecily Strong as Mary Ellen
- Ashley Greene as Krystal Manicucci
- Owen Benjamin as Health Inspector
- Vincent Pastore as Leo Manicucci
- Kate Walsh as Mrs. Campbell
- Gina Gershon as Ms. Greeley
- Colin Jost as Officer Callahan
- Jim Gaffigan as Mr. Campbell
- Method Man as Konko
- Mary Birdsong as Bianca Manicucci
- Jackson Nicoll as Wendell
- Kate McKinnon as Mrs. Bandini Jr.
- Penny Marshall as Concession Stand Worker

== Production ==
On August 28, 2013, John DeLuca joined the cast. On September 18, 2013, Gina Gershon joined the cast. Principal photography began in August 2013.

== Release ==
The film was released for digital download on June 30, 2015. The film was released on July 31, 2015, on Netflix.

== Reception ==
On the review aggregator website Rotten Tomatoes, 33% of 12 critics' reviews are positive. Metacritic, which uses a weighted average, assigned the film a score of 41 out of 100, based on 8 critics, indicating "mixed or average" reviews.

== See also ==
- Red Oaks
