= Josh Stolberg =

American film director

- Born: 6 March 1971 (age 54); Columbia, South Carolina, United States
- Occupations: Film director; novelist; screenwriter
- Years active: 1991-present

Josh Stolberg is an American film director, screenwriter, and photographer. He is known for comedies, such as the film Good Luck Chuck, starring Dane Cook, Jessica Alba and Dan Fogler. As of July 2025, Stolberg is the co-host of the filmmaking podcast Darren and Josh Make a Movie alongside Darren Lynn Bousman.

== Career ==
Stolberg won the Seashore Award and the Queen Spirit Award as a director of the film The Life Coach. He also wrote and directed the 2005 film Kids in America, and made a cameo appearance as a security guard in the film. He was also a part of the writing team for the first two episodes of Book 1: Water of Avatar: The Last Airbender.

He also branched into horror films, penning the remakes Piranha 3D (directed by Alexandre Aja) and Sorority Row. He co-wrote the scripts for several entries in the long-running Saw franchise, such as Jigsaw, Spiral and Saw X. Among his projects in development are the adaptation of the book The Spellman Files, to be produced by Laura Ziskin; Man-Witch (to be directed by Todd Phillips) as well as the adaptation of the book The Candy Shop War.

== Filmography ==
Year	Film			
Year	Film	Director	Writer	Producer
2005	Kids in America	Yes	Yes	No
2005	The Life Coach	Yes	No	No
2007	Good Luck Chuck	No	Yes	No
2009	Sorority Row	No	Yes	No
2010	Piranha 3D	No	Yes	No
2011	Conception	Yes	Yes	Yes
2013	Crawlspace	Yes	Yes	No
2013	Feels So Good	Yes	No	Executive
2014	The Hungover Games	Yes	No	No
2017	Jigsaw	No	Yes	No
2021	Spiral: From the Book of Saw	No	Yes	No
2023	Saw X	No	Yes	No
2025	Skillhouse	Yes	Yes	No

Co-producer

- Piranha 3DD (2012)
