= All Hallows' Eve (2016 film) =

- Directed by: Charlie Vaughn
- Written by: Brandon Alexander III; Elizabeth Snoderly
- Produced by: Jale Helgren; Ralph McCloud; Elizabeth Snoderly
- Starring: Lexi Giovagnoli; John DeLuca; Ashley Argota; Diane Salinger; Martin Klebba
- Cinematography: Olivia Kuan
- Music by: Tom Jemmott
- Distributed by: MarVista Entertainment
- Release date: September 27, 2016
- Country: United States
- Language: English

All Hallows' Eve is a 2016 indie family Halloween film directed by Charlie Vaughn. The film stars Lexi Giovagnoli, John DeLuca, Ashley Argota, Diane Salinger, and Martin Klebba.

== Plot ==
As Eve celebrates her birthday, she learns the truth of who she really is. For generations, her mother's family has passed down an old amulet and the power of a witch to one girl on her 18th birthday. This time, it is her turn. While exploring her new powers, Eve attempts to summon her deceased mother, against the warnings of her best friend, and Barnaby, her faithful protector. Instead, she accidentally summons an old ancestor who bears her no goodwill and is crazy and seeks to wreak havoc. The three friends are forced to flee for their lives. Time is ticking for her loved ones in danger, as Eve rushes to fix the mess around her. Only by realizing the power inside of herself will she be able to help them in time.

== Cast ==
- Lexi Giovagnoli as Eve Hallow
- John DeLuca as Wade
- Ashley Argota as Sarah Ettels
- Diane Salinger as Delayna Hallow
- Martin Klebba as Barnaby
- Dee Wallace as Haidy Hallow
- Tracey Gold as Didi Hallow
- Kelsey Impicciche as Alison Stone
- Pilot Saraceno as Jessa Moreland
- Daniel Cooksley as Richard Moreland
- Dillon Cavitt as Nathan

== Production ==
Principal photography began on November 3, 2015. The film was shot in Conway, SC.

== Release ==
All Hallows' Eve was released on iTunes, Amazon and Google Play on September 27, 2016.

== See also ==
- List of films set around Halloween
