= Chalk It Up =

- Directed by: Hisonni Johnson
- Written by: Brooke Buffington; Maddy Curley
- Produced by: Brooke Buffington; Maddy Curley
- Starring: Maddy Curley; John DeLuca; Nikki SooHoo; Drew Seeley; Julie Warner; Thomas Fowler
- Cinematography: Hisonni Johnson
- Music by: Chad Cannon
- Release date: September 13, 2016
- Running time: 90 minutes
- Country: United States
- Language: English

Chalk It Up is a 2016 American gymnastics film directed by former gymnast Hisonni Johnson. The film stars Maddy Curley, John DeLuca, Nikki SooHoo, Drew Seeley, Julie Warner, and Thomas Fowler.

SooHoo, Warner, Paige, and Curley had previously co-starred in Stick It; the two films are not otherwise connected, although both deal with competitive gymnastics.

== Plot ==
Apple, a student at the prestigious Greene University, has a business editing other students' papers. Her main goal is to marry her rugby-playing, idiotic boyfriend Todd. However, the rugby team is disbanded because of the Title IX rule, and Todd transfers to another school. Apple decides to start a women's gymnastics team so that he can stay. She and her roommate Cali, an intense but very sweet girl, find six athletic girls at Greene. She also meets Chet, another rugby player and the TA for her economics class. The athletics director eventually approves the gymnastics team. With Cali as their coach, the team starts to learn gymnastics. Apple and Chet grow closer, and he kisses her.

The rugby team is allowed to compete again. Todd returns to campus, makes Apple fold his clothes and then dumps her. Heartbroken, she quits the gymnastics team and starts spending her time going on dates. Without her, the team disbands, and her friends, including Chet and Cali, stop talking to her. Then, the school's dean finds out about Apple's paper-editing business. Apple has a hearing where she is accused of violating Greene University's academic policy. During the hearing, she realizes what the team meant to her, and the case is dismissed. She apologizes to her friends, and the gymnastics team is re-formed for the last competition of the season. Each gymnast improves with practice, and at the meet, they do well and hit all of their routines. Apple ends the competition by scoring a perfect 10 on floor exercise. Chet meets her afterwards, and the two kiss.

== Cast ==
- Maddy Curley as Apple
- John DeLuca as Chet
- Nikki SooHoo as Cali
- Drew Seeley as Todd
- Julie Warner as Dean York
- Thomas Fowler as Preston Kelly
- Nicholas Gonzalez as CIA Interviewer
- Tarah Paige as Emily
- Rachele Brooke Smith as Angelina
- Svetlana Boginskaya as Coach Baryshova
- Molly Gardner as Tanya
- Krista Jasper as Cashew
- Jenny Hansen as Becky
- Brittnee Habbib as Courtney
- Meghan Victoria Martin as Penny
- Cecile Garcia as Skylar

== Production ==
Principal photography began on September 3, 2014. The film was shot in 12 days.

== Release ==
The movie was made available for pre-ordering from August 25, 2016 on iTunes. It was released on iTunes, Amazon and Google Play on September 13, 2016.
