= Teen Choice Award for Choice Summer TV Star: Male =

Entertainment award category

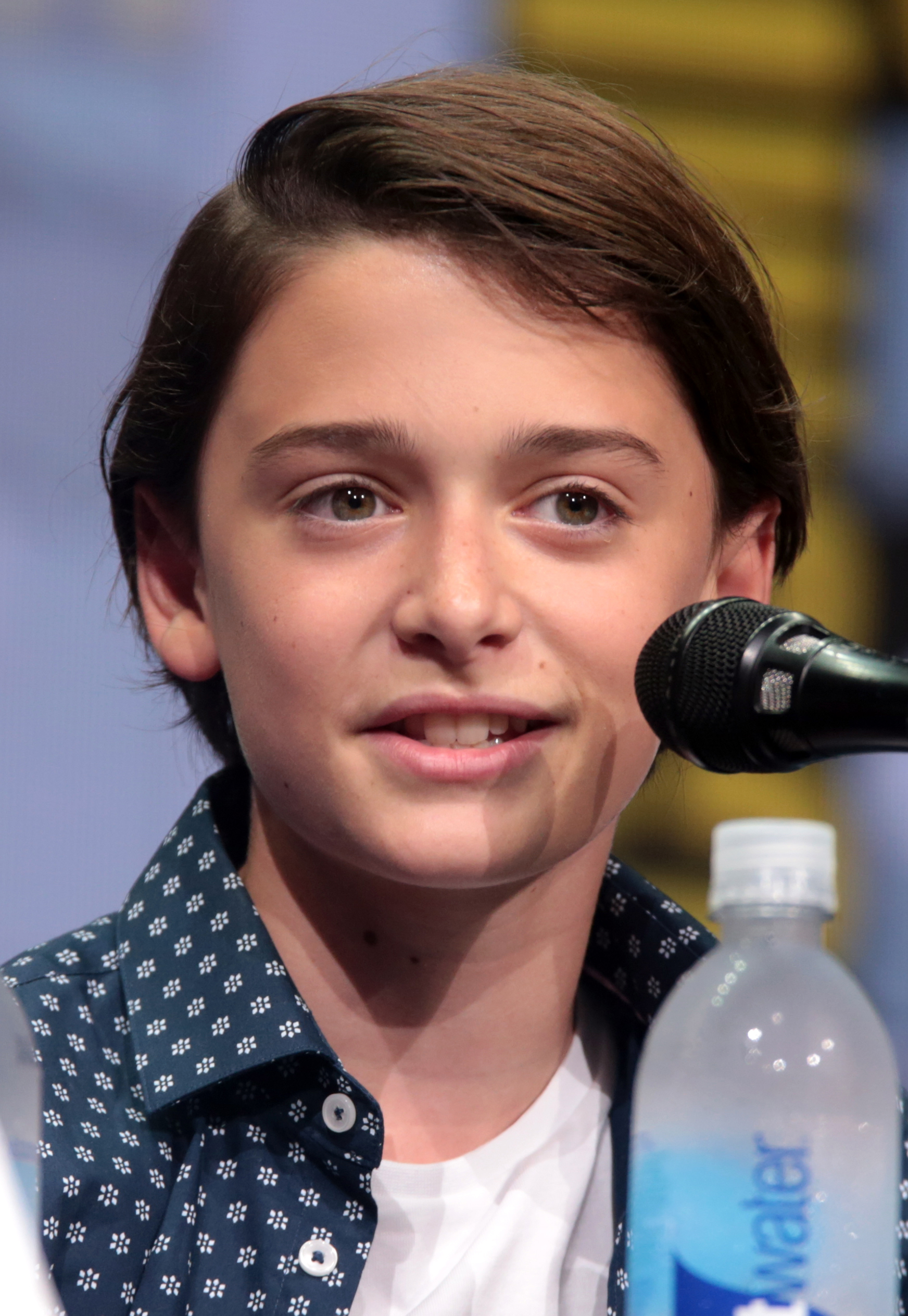
- 2019 Winner Noah Schnapp
- Country: United States
- First award: 2009
- Final award: 2019
- Currently held by: Noah Schnapp for Stranger Things (2019)

Highlights
- Most wins: Tyler Posey (2) Ian Harding (2) Tyler Blackburn (2)
- Most nominations: Tyler Posey (7)
- Website: http://www.teenchoice.com/

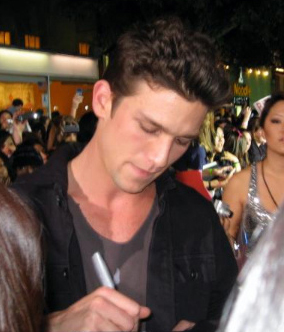
Daren Kagasoff was the first recipient of the award in 2009 for his role in The Secret Life of the American Teenager.

The following is a list of Teen Choice Award winners and nominees for Choice Summer TV Star: Male. The award was first introduced in 2009 with Daren Kagasoff being the inaugural winner.

Choice Summer TV Star: Male has been won by Tyler Blackburn, Ian Harding and Tyler Posey the most times, with two wins each one. Posey is the most nominated actor in this category with seven nominations.

In 2018, the award was introduced as Choice Summer TV Star with the nominees, Male and Females being in the same category.

The current winner as Choice Summer TV Star: Male is Noah Schnapp for Stranger Things (2019).

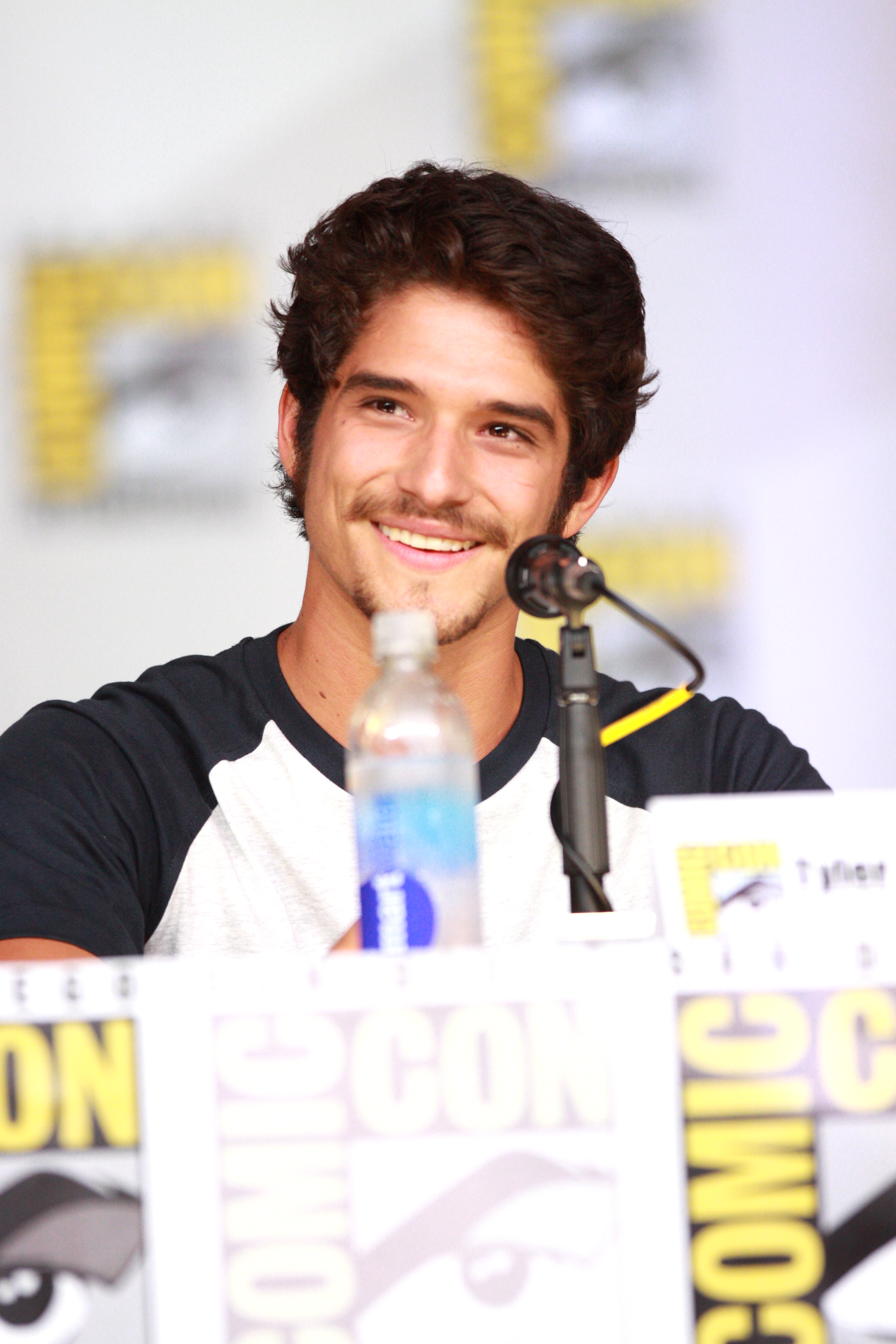
Two-time winner Tyler Posey, star of Teen Wolf, is the most nominated actor in this category with seven nominations. He is tied as the actor with the most wins.

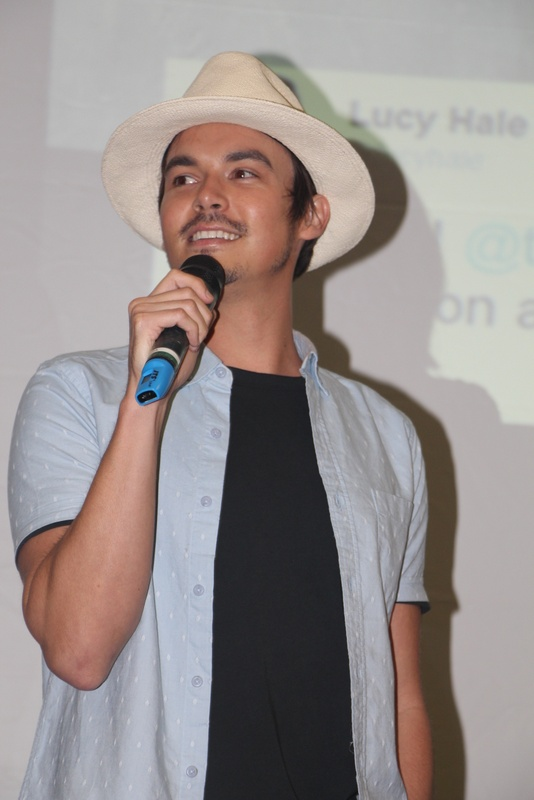
Two-time winner Tyler Blackburn, star of Pretty Little Liars, is tied as the actor with most wins.

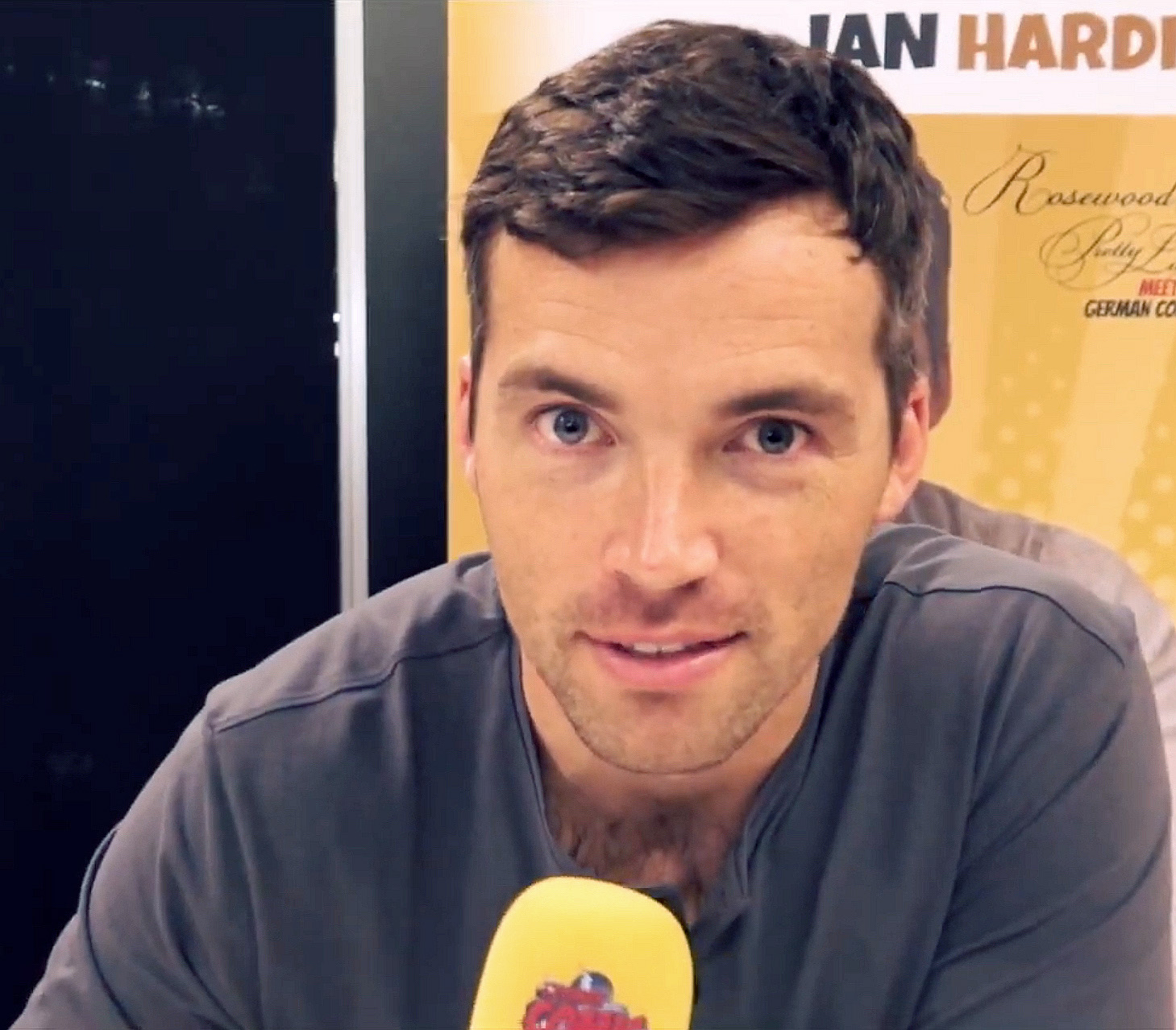
Two-time winner Ian Harding, star of Pretty Little Liars, is tied as the actor with most wins.

== Winners and nominees ==
=== 2000s ===
Year	Winner	Nominees	Ref.
2009	Daren Kagasoff – The Secret Life of the American Teenager	Ken Baumann – The Secret Life of the American Teenager; Adrian Grenier – Entourage; George Lopez – Mr. Troop Mom; Stephen Moyer – True Blood	

=== 2010s ===
Year	Winner	Nominees	Ref.
2010	Ian Harding – Pretty Little Liars	Zachary Abel – Make It or Break It; Ken Baumann – The Secret Life of the American Teenager; Daren Kagasoff – The Secret Life of the American Teenager; Stephen Moyer – True Blood	
2011	Ian Harding – Pretty Little Liars	Keegan Allen – Pretty Little Liars; Lucas Grabeel – Switched at Birth; Tyler Posey – Teen Wolf; Noah Wyle – Falling Skies	
2012	Tyler Posey – Teen Wolf	Ken Baumann – The Secret Life of the American Teenager; Jean-Luc Bilodeau – Baby Daddy; Michael Ealy – Common Law; Daren Kagasoff – The Secret Life of the American Teenager	
2013	Keegan Allen – Pretty Little Liars	Jake T. Austin – The Fosters; Jean-Luc Bilodeau – Baby Daddy; Avan Jogia – Twisted; Tyler Posey – Teen Wolf	
2014	Tyler Blackburn – Pretty Little Liars	Jean-Luc Bilodeau – Baby Daddy; David Lambert – The Fosters; Tyler Posey – Teen Wolf; Mike Vogel – Under the Dome	
2015	Tyler Blackburn – Pretty Little Liars	David Lambert – The Fosters; Ross Lynch – Teen Beach 2; Tyler Posey – Teen Wolf; Gregg Sulkin – Faking It; Mike Vogel – Under the Dome	
2016	Dylan O'Brien – Teen Wolf	Jean-Luc Bilodeau – Baby Daddy; David Lambert – The Fosters; Peyton Meyer – Girl Meets World; Tyler Posey – Teen Wolf; Gregg Sulkin – Faking It	
2017	Tyler Posey – Teen Wolf	Noah Centineo – The Fosters; Cody Christian – Teen Wolf; Kyle Harris – Stitchers; David Lambert – The Fosters; Harry Shum Jr. – Shadowhunters	
2018	Awarded as Choice Summer TV Star° Olivia Holt - Cloak & Dagger	Male Nominees: Aubrey Joseph – Cloak & Dagger; Xolo Maridueña – Cobra Kai; Female Nominees: Aisha Dee – The Bold Type; Meghann Fahy – The Bold Type; Katie Stevens – The Bold Type	
2019	Noah Schnapp – Stranger Things	Gaten Matarazzo – Stranger Things; Caleb McLaughlin – Stranger Things; Luka Sabbat – Grown-ish; Diego Tinoco – On My Block; Finn Wolfhard – Stranger Things	

== Most wins ==
The following individuals received two or more Choice Summer TV Star: Male awards:

2 Wins

- Tyler Blackburn
- Ian Harding
- Tyler Posey

== Most nominations ==
The following individuals received two or more Choice Summer TV Star: Male nominations:

7 Nominations

- Tyler Posey

4 Nominations

- Jean-Luc Bilodeau
- David Lambert

3 Nominations

- Ken Baumann
- Daren Kagasoff

2 Nominations

- Keegan Allen
- Tyler Blackburn
- Ian Harding
- Gregg Sulkin
- Stephen Moyer
- Mike Vogel
