= Dotson Rader =

American dramatist

Dotson Rader (born July 25, 1941, in Evanston, Illinois) is an American author and playwright who has published four novels and three works of non-fiction as well as God Looked Away, a stage play about Tennessee Williams.

== Biography ==
Rader was a student at Columbia University, and had a side gig as a male hustler. He made his way into the elite echelons of the New York City literary scene. During the 1970s, he became the live-in love of the actress Ruth Ford. He is the author of several books, including I Ain't Marchin Anymore, about the on-campus protests and upheaval during the 1960s, the title inspired by the earlier song by Phil Ochs of the same name, and Cry of the Heart, about his long friendship with the famed American playwright Tennessee Williams, which began in the 1950s.

For many years Rader conducted interviews and has written feature articles for Parade magazine. Rader's first play, God Looked Away, about Tennessee Williams, had a six-week trial run at the Pasadena Playhouse in Pasadena, California, in 2018 with Al Pacino in the leading role and Judith Light and Garrett Clayton in other featured turns.
