= Kids in America (film) =

- Theatrical release poster
- Directed by: Josh Stolberg
- Written by: Josh Stolberg; Andrew Shaifer
- Produced by: Andrew Shaifer
- Starring: Gregory Smith; Stephanie Sherrin; Nicole Richie; Chris Morris; George Wendt; Adam Arkin; Samantha Mathis; Charles Shaughnessy; W. Earl Brown; Malik Yoba; Julie Bowen
- Cinematography: Guy Livneh
- Edited by: Tracy Curtis
- Music by: BC Smith
- Distributed by: Screen Media; Rainstorm Entertainment; Launchpad Releasing; Slowhand Cinema
- Release date: October 21, 2005
- Running time: 91 minutes
- Country: United States
- Language: English
- Budget: $750,000
- Box office: $537,667

Kids in America is a 2005 American comedy film written and directed by Josh Stolberg. The film is inspired by real events.

== Plot ==
Inspired by real events, Kids In America is a comedy about a diverse group of high school students who band together to peacefully stand for their personal rights and dignity. Holden Donovan and his love interest, libertarian Charlotte Pratt, are fed up with Principal Donna Weller, who goes to great lengths to stop the students from enjoying their right to free expression, such as suspending Monica Rose for wearing condoms on her outfit to promote safe sex during Spirit Week and suspending Lawrence Reitzer for kissing another boy in the hallway. Meanwhile, Weller is running for State School Superintendent, which, if elected, will afford her the power to practice her brand of administration beyond Booker High School. Holden himself is suspended and ultimately expelled for speaking out publicly against Weller, to whom he says, "You're nothing but a politician".

The students have an ally, Mr. Will Drucker, one of their teachers who encourages them to fight for their rights. He pays a price for his position and is fired by Principal Weller. He decides to use his dismissal to make a change of his own, using his new-found free time to produce a documentary chronicling the experiences of students who are faced with similar issues. Holden befriends a group of students, including voyeuristic punk-rock fan Chuck McGinn, cheerleader Katie Carmichael, Chinese-American Emily Chua, homosexual Lawrence Reitzer, African-American Walanda Jenkins, cheerleader Kelly Stepford, founder of the school's celibacy society Monica Rose, cheerleader Ashley Harris, and goth chick Dementia. Together, they engage in civil disobedience, passing out condoms and staging walk-outs, and organize the student body to take on Principal Weller and make a real change at Booker High. Due to their efforts, Weller loses the election and subsequently quits her job.

== Cast ==
=== Students ===
- Gregory Smith as Holden Donovan
- Stephanie Sherrin as Charlotte Pratt
- Chris Morris as Chuck McGinn
- Caitlin Wachs as Katie Carmichael
- Emy Coligado as Emily Chua
- Alex Anfanger as Lawrence Reitzer
- Crystal Celeste Grant as Walanda Jenkins
- Nicole Richie as Kelly Stepford
- Rosalie Ward as Monica Rose
- Genevieve Padalecki as Ashley Harris
- Rakefet Abergel as Goth Girl
- Damien Luvara as Rick Garcia
- Marcella Lentz-Pope as Elizabeth Goings
- Raymond Braun as Mo Williams

=== Faculty and staff ===
- Julie Bowen as Principal Donna Weller
- Malik Yoba as Mr. Will Drucker
- Andrew Shaifer as Mr. Kip Stratton, the drama teacher
- Adam Arkin as Mr. Ed Mumsford, the math teacher
- George Wendt as Coach Thompson
- Jeff Chase as Asst. Coach Fasso
- Leila Charles as Ms. Jane Jordan (Will Drucker's girlfriend)

=== Parents ===
- Samantha Mathis as Jennifer Rose (Monica's mother)
- Rosanna Arquette as Abby Pratt (Charlotte's mother)
- Elizabeth Perkins as Sandra Carmichael (Katie's mother)
- Charles Shaughnessy as Mr. Carmichael (Katie's father)
- W. Earl Brown as Boss McGinn (Chuck's father)
- Kim Coles as Loretta Jenkins (Walanda's mother)

== Inspirations ==
The film was inspired by true events. Three students in particular are interviewed at the end of the film, including:

- Lanessa Riobe of Osceola High School, who was suspended for taping condoms to her shirt in order to promote safe sex,
- Natalie "Nicky" Young, who was suspended for wearing a shirt proclaiming, "Barbie is a Lesbian", and
- Rachel Boim, who was suspended for writing a story about a girl experiencing a violent dream.

== Soundtrack ==
The film contains the following songs:

- "Bonnie Taylor Shakedown" - hellogoodbye
- "Freedom Ain't Free" - Crystal Celeste Grant and Steve Kim
- "False Alarm" - The Hometeam
- "Hands 2 tha Pump" - Da Digger
- "You Are My Friend" - Brownskin
- "Welcome to My World" - Nerf Herder
- "Race Cars" - Allister
- "Change the World" - An Angle
- "It Ain't Right" - Ilona
- "Remembering Britt" - Day at the Fair
- "Sesame Smeshame" - The Early November
- "Anthem" - Trevor Hall
- "Sunday in the Public Restroom with George" - Rand Singer, Alex Anfanger and Chris Morris
- "Symphony" - I Am the Avalanche
- "She Rules the School" - Daniel Cieral
- "I Want You" - James Blunt
- "If You Were Here" - Thompson Twins
- "Moving in Stereo" - The Cars
- "Exit, Emergency" - Houston Calls
- "My Sleep Pattern Changed" - The Early November
- "Knights of the Island Counter" - Dave Melillo
- "Letters to Summer" - The Track Record
- "U and Left Turns" - Socratic
- "Bad" - Ilona
- "The Bad Touch" - Bloodhound Gang
- "Sydney" - Halifax
- "It's the End of the World as We Know It (And I Feel Fine)" - R.E.M.
- "Somewhere on Fullerton" - Allister
- "One More Won't Hurt" - Houston Calls
- "All Our Words" - Long Since Forgotten
- "Summertime" - Brother Love

== Reception ==
On review aggregator website Rotten Tomatoes the film has a score of 17% based on reviews from 36 critics, with an average rating of 4.4/10. The site's consensus states: "An awkward blend of teen comedy and social commentary, Kids in America largely fails to provoke thought or laughter".
