= Skillhouse =

2025 horror film directed by Josh Stolberg

- Theatrical release poster
- Directed by: Josh Stolberg
- Written by: Josh Stolberg
- Produced by: Brad Baskin; Brett Dahl; Ryan Kavanaugh; Shane Valdez
- Starring: Bryce Hall; Hannah Stocking; 50 Cent; Neal McDonough
- Cinematography: Will Barratt
- Edited by: Peter Harding; Sawyer Hurwitz
- Music by: Ryan Huntley Andrews
- Production companies: G-Unit Films and Television Inc.; Proxima Studios; WGEN-TV; Lifeboat Productions; Group Black
- Distributed by: Fathom Entertainment
- Release dates: January 24, 2025 (Sundance); July 11, 2025 (United States)
- Running time: 99 minutes
- Country: United States
- Language: English

Skillhouse (stylized as SKILLH😵USE and Skill House), is a 2025 American horror film written and directed by Josh Stolberg. It stars 50 Cent, Neal McDonough, Leah Pipes, Caitlin Carmichael and TikTok stars Hannah Stocking and Bryce Hall. The film is about ten influencers who are kidnapped and forced into a deadly social media showdown where the stakes are life and death.

== Synopsis ==
Carter is an influencer who is grieving the loss of his sister Lauren, who was murdered while the two were filming a video for social media. While he is trying to regain a sense of normality Carter is kidnapped along with nine other influencers and imprisoned. They are all told that they must compete with one another to gain viewers: the one with the fewest views per round will be killed.

== Cast ==
- Bryce Hall as Carter Swick
- Hannah Stocking as Lauren Swick
- Curtis "50 Cent" Jackson as 50 Cent
- Neal McDonough as Brandon Vega
- Jacob Skidmore as Sebastian Bousman
- Gunner Burkhardt as Asher
- Kaitlyn Squires as Finn
- Leah Pipes as Rumer Brandjes
- McCarrie McCausland as Josiah Wolk
- Emily Mei as Amanda Lashing
- Caitlin Carmichael as Maureen 'Mo' Hart
- Dani Oliveros as Kirsten Anderson
- Abigail Killmeier as Molly Rose Richardson
- Ivan Leung as Keo Lau
- Paige VanZant as Peyton Hackl
- John DeLuca as A.J. Berg

== Production ==
Plans to create Skillhouse were first announced in 2022. Deadline reported that it was intended to be the first in a franchise starring Bryce Hall. News outlets reported that Curtis "50 Cent" Jackson was brought in as a producer through his company G-Unit Films and Television Inc., alongside Alex Baskin, Lifeboat Productions’ Amy Kim and Jaime Burke, and Ryan Kavanaugh’s Proxima Studios. Steve Johnson was brought on to provide special effects. Josh Stolberg was brought on to direct and later claimed that Johnson's special effects caused a camera operator to faint.

=== Filming ===
The film was shot in 2022 at the Sway House mansion in Bel‑Air, Los Angeles.

== Lawsuit ==
In April 2025, Curtis Jackson filed a lawsuit against Ryan Kavanaugh and GenTV, seeking to block the platform from streaming Skillhouse. In his suit, Jackson stated that he was not paid and had not signed a deal to use his image and name, meaning Kavanaugh was engaging in trademark infringement, false advertising, and unfair competition. Jackson was seeking a block of the film’s release and $5 million in damages.

Jackson requested a preliminary injunction to block the film's release but was unsuccessful, as a federal judge did not feel that Jackson had met the required legal standards of establishing that the film would successfully cause irreparable harm.

== Release ==
Film rights to Skillhouse were acquired by Red Sea Media. The film was premiered at Sundance Film Festival on January 24, 2025, and had a limited theatrical release via Fathom Entertainment on July 11, 2025.

== Reception ==
Critical reception for Skillhouse has been negative. Bloody Disgusting's Matt Donato panned Skillhouse, criticizing its characters as unlikeable and giving viewers "no reason to care about any of the contestants". He further noted that the film was "the MadTV to Deadstream's Saturday Night Live in terms of quality, but even that’s giving too much credit" and that it contributed to "the misconception that horror cinema is only senseless blood and guts." Jeff Ewing of Collider was also critical, stating that the cinematography was flat, that the actors lacked performative skill, that the film lacked good suspense, and that while the film had well-executed gore, that it did not follow the in-universe rules and "muddles its premise".
