= Teen Beach 2 =

2015 Disney Channel Original Movie directed by Jeffrey Hornaday

- Television release poster
- Genre: Comedy; Musical
- Based on: Characters by Vince Marcello; Mark Landry; Robert Horn
- Screenplay by: Matt Eddy; Billy Eddy
- Story by: Dan Berendsen; Robert Horn
- Directed by: Jeffrey Hornaday
- Starring: Ross Lynch; Maia Mitchell; Grace Phipps; Garrett Clayton; Jordan Fisher; John Deluca; Chrissie Fit; Piper Curda
- Theme music composer: David Lawrence
- Country of origin: United States
- Original language: English

Production
- Producer: Michael Gallant
- Production location: Puerto Rico
- Cinematography: Mark Irwin
- Editor: David Finfer
- Running time: 104 minutes
- Production company: Rain Forest Productions

Original release
- Network: Disney Channel
- Release: June 26, 2015

Related
- Teen Beach Movie

Teen Beach 2 is a 2015 American musical teen comedy drama film released as a Disney Channel Original Movie. The sequel to the 2013 film Teen Beach Movie, it was again directed by Jeffrey Hornaday, from a screenplay by the writing team of Matt and Bill Eddy, and a story conceived by Robert Horn and Dan Berendsen. Ross Lynch, Maia Mitchell, Grace Phipps, Garrett Clayton, John DeLuca, Chrissie Fit, Jordan Fisher, Kent Boyd, Mollee Gray, William Loftis, and Jessica Lee Keller reprise their roles from the first film, joined by newcomers Piper Curda, Ross Butler, Raymond Cham Jr., and Beth Lacke.

Teen Beach 2 premiered on Disney Channel on June 26, 2015. The film was the first sequel of a Disney Channel Original Movie in five years, the previous one being Camp Rock 2: The Final Jam (2010).

== Plot ==
On the eve of the first day of school, Brady and McKenzie "Mack" celebrate the day they met and reminisce about the summer while they watch Wet Side Story, the 1960s musical film that they got stuck in. (Note: As depicted in Teen Beach Movie (2013)) Mack dismisses Brady's fear that their relationship will change when they begin school. Mack then realizes she lost the necklace she received while in the Wet Side Story world.

At school, Brady and Mack reunite with their respective friends, Devon and Alyssa, who are surprised by their new relationship due to their opposite personalities. Later, in class, Brady is working on surfboard designs, but hides them when Mack asks him what he is doing. Mack begins work on a "Save the Beach" dance, despite Brady's attempts to see her. Struggling with a college application, Brady works on a surfboard instead and accidentally forgets about a college fair that he was to attend with Mack, upsetting her to the point that they break up.

In the Wet Side Story world, Lela and Tanner suddenly break with the film's plot, having experienced changes within themselves since Mack and Brady's visit. They then notice Mack's necklace and dive into the ocean, eventually winding up in the same world as Mack and Brady, who are still not on good terms. With Lela and Tanner marveling at the wonders of the modern world, Mack and Brady attempts to convince them that the world is not as great as it seems, in hopes that they will return to their own world. Meanwhile, the characters of Wet Side Story are left confused without Lela and Tanner, with Cheechee and Seacat attempting, but failing, to substitute for the starring duo.

Brady and Mack bring Lela and Tanner to school, where their film characteristics come out against Mack and Brady's cautions. Lela becomes too enthralled with math homework to spend time with Tanner after school, and Tanner confesses to Brady that he worries he is not enough for Lela, while Brady reveals to Tanner that he and Mack are taking a break. He also shows Tanner his surfboards, and alludes that Mack might not understand his newfound hobby. Upon noticing that Lela and Tanner are integrating into the modern world, Mack and Brady attempts to convince them that they are just characters from a film, showing them clips from Wet Side Story. Upset by this, Lela throws the necklace into the ocean, prompting Mack and Brady to search for it. Meanwhile, back in the Wet Side Story world, characters begin disappearing. Butchy notices the necklace, which he uses to lead the film gang into the modern world, where they inform Lela, Tanner, Brady, and Mack about the disappearing characters. Brady and Mack realize that without the main actors, the film world would cease to exist. The film characters return to their world.

Brady and Mack avoid each other during the "Save the Beach" dance, but are greeted by the Wet Side Story gang, who returns to get them to reconcile. The gang begins to disappear, including Butchy with the necklace. This prompts Brady and Mack to retrieve Mack's grandfather's surfboard, which they first used to get into the Wet Side Story universe. With no waves, Brady decides to use a motorized surfboard he created, along with the emblem from Mack's grandfather's surfboard. Mack compares Brady's hobby to her grandfather's surfboard passion, and they agree not to keep secrets from each other.

Before Tanner and Lela leave, Mack tells Lela to make the film her story. Brady fixes a surfboard malfunction, allowing Lela and Tanner to depart. When Brady emerges from the sea, he and Mack appear not to know each other. They later meet at the "Save the Beach" dance, which Mack says is themed after her favorite film, Lela, Queen of the Beach. It is revealed that Lela had followed Mack's advice and changed the film, giving it more feminist tones but unintentionally erasing Brady and Mack's history together. Despite this, Mack and Brady fall in love again.

== Cast ==
- Ross Lynch as Brady
- Maia Mitchell as McKenzie "Mack"
- Grace Phipps as Lela
- Garrett Clayton as Tanner
- John DeLuca as Butchy
- Chrissie Fit as Cheechee
- Piper Curda as Alyssa
- Beth Lacke as Brady's mother
- Jordan Fisher as Seacat
- Raymond Cham Jr. as Devon
- Ross Butler as Spencer
- Mollee Gray as Giggles
- Jessica Lee Keller as Struts
- William Loftis as Lugnut
- Kent Boyd as Rascal

== Production ==
On April 27, 2014, a sequel, Teen Beach 2, was announced as slated to premiere in 2015 on Disney Channel, with production set for July 2014 in Puerto Rico. It is the fourth Disney Channel Original Movie to be filmed in Puerto Rico, after Princess Protection Program (2009), Wizards of Waverly Place: The Movie (2009), and Teen Beach Movie. Ross Lynch, Maia Mitchell, Grace Phipps, Garrett Clayton and John DeLuca reprise their roles in the sequel. The remaining actors who portray the bikers and surfers, Jordan Fisher, Chrissie Fit, William Loftis, Kent Boyd, Jessica Lee Keller and Mollee Gray, were also confirmed to return for the sequel. The film revolve around the characters from Wet Side Story after the first film's post-credits scene, when they were transported into the real world. Teen Beach 2 is the first Disney Channel Original Movie sequel since Camp Rock 2: The Final Jam in 2010. The Disney official site for the movie stated it will be released "Summer 2015" as Teen Beach 2. It premiered on June 26, 2015. It is one hour and 45 minutes long.

== Reception ==
The movie received mixed reviews from critics. Brian Lowry of Variety wrote that while the songs were generally great and the storyline was easy to understand, "Everything else is really just the storytelling equivalent of pulling taffy, trying to create enough impediments to keep the narrative clunking along until the next spontaneous outbreak of song. Thankfully, there's a great deal of talent on the screen, though the words generally sound far better when sung than spoken." R. Thomas Umstead of Multichannel News awarded the movie 3.5 stars out of 5, writing, "Much like Teen Beach Movie, the sequel is full of impressive dance numbers, often silly dialogue and toe-tapping pop music songs that will certainly appeal to the network's target 6-to-11-year-old audience. Still, Teen Beach 2 lacks a bit of the charm exhibited in the first movie, although that will not matter much to fans of the original."

The film drew 5.8 total million viewers on its premiere night, becoming the most watched DCOM since its prequel Teen Beach Movie aired in 2013. In L+3, Teen Beach 2 delivered 7.5 million viewers and along with the weekend encore telecasts, totals 13.3 million viewers.

== Soundtrack ==
Teen Beach 2 (Original TV Movie Soundtrack)

Soundtrack album by Various artists
- Released: June 23, 2015
- Recorded: 2014
- Genres: Pop; pop rock; surf rock; R&B; Rockabilly
- Length: 45:17
- Label: Walt Disney

Ross Lynch chronology
Austin & Ally: Take It from the Top (2015)	Teen Beach 2 (Original TV Movie Soundtrack) (2015)

The soundtrack album for the film was released on June 23, 2015, by Walt Disney Records.

=== Track listing ===
Teen Beach 2 – Standard edition
No.	Title	Artist(s)	Length
1.	"Best Summer Ever"	Ross Lynch; Maia Mitchell; Garrett Clayton; Grace Phipps; John DeLuca; Jordan Fisher; Chrissie Fit	3:28
2.	"On My Own"	Lynch	2:25
3.	"Right Where I Wanna Be"	Clayton; Phipps	2:29
4.	"Falling for Ya"	Fisher; Fit	2:04
5.	"Wanna Be with You"	Fisher	2:51
6.	"Twist Your Frown Upside Down"	Lynch; Mitchell; Clayton; Phipps	2:58
7.	"Silver Screen"	Lynch; Mitchell	2:58
8.	"Rescue Me"	Sabrina Carpenter	2:34
9.	"Gotta Be Me"	Lynch; Mitchell; Clayton; Phipps; DeLuca; Fisher	3:53
10.	"Meant to Be (Reprise 3)"	Lynch; Mitchell; Clayton; Phipps	1:55
11.	"That's How We Do"	Lynch; Mitchell; Clayton; Phipps; DeLuca; Fisher	3:36
12.	"Starting Over"	R5	2:55
13.	"On My Own (Radio Version)"	Lynch	3:27
14.	"Best Summer Ever"	Matthew Tishler; Amy Powers	3:28
15.	"Gotta Be Me"	Niclas Molinder; Joacim Persson; Johan Alkenäs; Charlie Mason	3:54
Total length:			45:17

=== Charts ===
Chart	Peak position
U.S. Billboard 200	10
U.S. Billboard Top Soundtracks	1
U.S. Billboard Digital Albums	7
U.S. Billboard Kids Albums	1

== Awards and nominations ==
Year	Award	Category	Nominee	Result
2015	Teen Choice Awards	Choice Summer TV Star: Male	Ross Lynch	Nominated
2015	Teen Choice Awards	Choice Summer TV Star: Female	Maia Mitchell	Nominated
2015	Teen Choice Awards	Choice Music: Song from a Movie or TV Show	Teen Beach 2	Nominated
