= Brighton, New York =

Brighton, New York may refer to:

- Brighton, Erie County, New York, a neighborhood in Tonawanda, New York
- Brighton, Franklin County, New York, a town
- Brighton, Monroe County, New York, a town
- Brighton, Syracuse, New York, a neighborhood in Syracuse, New York

== See also ==
- Brighton Beach, an oceanside community in Brooklyn, New York City near Coney Island
- New Brighton, Staten Island, a former village, now part of New York City
- Brighton (disambiguation)
