= Teen Beach Movie =

2013 Disney Channel film directed by Jeffrey Hornaday

- Television release poster
- Screenplay by: Vince Marcello; Mark Landry; Robert Horn
- Story by: Vince Marcello; Mark Landry
- Directed by: Jeffrey Hornaday
- Starring: Ross Lynch; Maia Mitchell; Grace Phipps; Garrett Clayton; Jordan Fisher; John DeLuca; Chrissie Fit; Kevin Chamberlin; Steve Valentine
- Theme music composer: David Lawrence
- Country of origin: United States
- Original language: English

Production
- Producer: Robert F. Phillips
- Production location: Puerto Rico
- Cinematography: Mark Irwin
- Editor: David Finfer
- Running time: 95 minutes
- Production company: Rain Forest Productions
- Budget: $8 million

Original release
- Network: Disney Channel
- Release: July 19, 2013

Related
- Teen Beach 2

Teen Beach Movie is a 2013 American musical teen romantic comedy film released as a Disney Channel Original Movie. Directed by Jeffrey Hornaday and written by Vince Marcello, Mark Landry, Robert Horn, it was filmed in Puerto Rico. The movie premiered on July 19, 2013, on Disney Channel and stars Ross Lynch and Maia Mitchell. Teen Beach Movie was the only Disney Channel Original Movie to premiere in 2013. A sequel, Teen Beach 2, premiered on June 26, 2015.

== Plot ==
McKenzie, "Mack," and her boyfriend, Brady, surf near her grandfather's beach hut in Waikiki. Shortly thereafter, Mack walks in on her grandfather and Brady who are watching their favorite film, a 1960s musical titled Wet Side Story, in which surfers and motorcycle bikers battle for the privilege to hang out at Big Momma's beachside restaurant. When Mack's aunt comes by, she explains to Brady that before Mack’s mother died, she promised Mack’s mother that Mack would attend a private school, and that she will be leaving the next day. Mack asserts that although leaving is not her choice, she feels it is what she has to do since it is what her mother would have wanted. She subsequently tells Brady that they must break up.

Before Mack leaves, she decides to surf an impending 40-foot wave on her family's surfboard. Brady gets on a jet ski and goes after Mack, but they both get swept away, eventually landing on another beach. They soon realize that they have been swept into the realm of the Wet Side Story film. Seizing the moment, Brady joins the film's cast in singing, to Mack's dismay. Brady relents and informs Mack that there will be a storm and giant wave that should bring them back home at the end of the film. They go into Big Momma's and introduce themselves to the surfers just before the bikers appear and start the surf and turf war. Mack and Brady are then invited to a party at Big Momma's later that night.

That evening, Mack and Brady argue while the film's female lead, Lela (one of the biker girls), sings on stage. Tanner, the male lead and one of the surfer boys, falls in love with Mack after she bumps into him, whilst Brady catches Lela, who subsequently falls in love with him, as she falls off the stage. This interferes with the film's plot, as Lela was supposed to fall into Tanner’s arms. Brady and Mack determine to make Tanner and Lela fall in love to fix things. Brady also tells Mack about the film's villains, Les Camembert and Dr. Fusion, who plan to use a weather modification machine to make the surfers and bikers leave so they can redevelop Big Momma's into a beach resort.

Lela and Tanner express their love for Brady and Mack, who subtly suggest to them that there may be someone else they are really meant to be with. That night Mack joins Lela and the other biker girls for a sleepover, while Brady hangs out with Tanner and the surfer boys at Big Momma's. Brady and Mack's modern relationship views come into conflict with those of the 1960s; they fail to make progress on getting Lela and Tanner together. The next night, Lela tells Mack that she would like to surf.

Mack and Brady realize that they are morphing into the film when Mack falls into the water and her hair does not get wet. They begin to sing involuntarily before being captured by Les Camembert and Dr. Fusion and taken to the lighthouse lair. Lela and Tanner fall in love with each other and soon realize that Mack and Brady have been kidnapped. They convince the bikers and surfers to team up and save Mack and Brady. Meanwhile, Mack admits that she is glad that she ended up in the film and does not have to attend private school. When Mack says she thinks Lela is braver than her, Brady denies that, saying that Mack is the bravest girl he knows.

The surfers and bikers free Mack and Brady and destroy the villains' machine. The film's plot returns to normal, and Mack and Brady realize they are able to return home. After bidding farewell, Mack and Brady get on the surfboard and returns to the real world, where no time has passed since they left. Mack successfully surfs the 40-foot wave. Mack's aunt is upset about her delaying their flight but accepts her decision to spend the rest of the year with Brady.

In a post-credits scene, Lela, Tanner, Butchy, Seacat, Struts and Giggles wash up into the real world. A modern-day surfer thinks they are lost and allows them to use his cell phone, which they marvel at as they attempt to use it.

== Cast ==
- Ross Lynch as Brady
- Maia Mitchell as McKenzie "Mack"
- Grace Phipps as Lela
- Garrett Clayton as Tanner
  - Spencer Lee provides Tanner's singing voice
- John DeLuca as Butchy
  - Jason Evigan provides Butchy's singing voice
- Chrissie Fit as Cheechee
- Suzanne Cryer as Aunt Antoinette
- Barry Bostwick as Big Poppa
- Kevin Chamberlin as Dr. Fusion
- Steve Valentine as Les Camembert
- Jordan Fisher as Seacat
- Kent Boyd as Rascal
- Mollee Gray as Giggles
- William Loftis as Lugnut
- Jessica Lee Keller as Struts
- LaVon Fisher-Wilson as Big Momma
- Caitlynn Lawson as Kiki

== Production ==
The script was written by Vince Marcello, Mark Landry and Robert Horn, from a story by Marcello and Landry. Pre-production of the film began in January 2012. Teen Beach Movie was the third Disney Channel Original Movie filmed in Puerto Rico, the first two being Princess Protection Program and Wizards of Waverly Place: The Movie.

On March 28, 2012, local Puerto Rican press reported on the filming, which took place on the island. Most beach scenes took place in Fajardo on the east coast of the island, including the beach house of the Governor of Puerto Rico, while indoor scenes, such as McKenzie's bedroom, a restaurant, and a kitchen, were filmed inside an undisclosed warehouse in Bayamón. Mariella Pérez Serrano, who was executive director of the Puerto Rico Film Corporation at the time, said Disney had spent about eight million dollars to film the production in Puerto Rico when the film was titled Teen Beach Musical at the time.

The film's soundtrack features ten original songs composed in rhythms of surf rock, Motown R&B, rockabilly and pop.

Teen Beach Movie was the only Disney Channel Original Movie that was released in 2013.

The film was dedicated to beach party film star Annette Funicello, who died on April 8, 2013. A memorial message preceding the start of the film read, "In memory of Disney legend Annette Funicello, the world's most beloved beach movie star."

To promote the film, seven-foot branded beach balls were dropped at One Direction and R5 concerts across the country as well as brand deals with Honda and Best Western. There was also a 10-city "Teen Beach Movie Beach Party" event tour

The High School Musical/Disney Channel Rocks dance shows in Hollywood Studios were moved to Typhoon Lagoon at Walt Disney World Resort and re-themed into the Teen Beach Movie: Dance Party, which ran from June 24 to September 1, 2013. It was later brought back in 2015 to tie in with the sequel, Teen Beach 2.

One Direction filmed promotional videos for the film as a tie-in with Radio Disney's Sizzlin’ Summer Concert Series Sweepstakes, where they previewed their song "Best Song Ever".

== Soundtrack ==
Teen Beach Movie (Original TV Movie Soundtrack)

Soundtrack album by Various artists
- Released: July 15, 2013
- Recorded: 2012
- Genres: Pop; pop rock; surf; R&B; Rockabilly
- Length: 41:49
- Label: Walt Disney

Ross Lynch chronology
Austin & Ally (2012)	Teen Beach Movie (Original TV Movie Soundtrack) (2013)	Austin & Ally: Turn It Up (2013)

The soundtrack album for the film was released on July 15, 2013, by Walt Disney Records. The album was the fourth best-selling soundtrack of 2013 in the United States with 407,000 copies sold for the year. The album peaked at number three on the Billboard 200 chart. As of 2017 the soundtrack has sold over 500,000 units making it certified Gold. Cruisin' for a Bruisin' debuted and peaked at number eighty-two on the Billboard Hot 100 chart.

=== Track listing ===
Teen Beach Movie – Standard edition
No.	Title	Artist(s)	Length
1.	"Oxygen (Note: The song "Oxygen" was originally recorded by Hoku from her 2000 self-titled album.)"	Maia Mitchell	3:01
2.	"Surf Crazy"	Spencer Lee; Teen Beach Movie Cast; Keely Hawk	3:02
3.	"Cruisin' for a Bruisin'"	Ross Lynch; Jason Evigan; Grace Phipps	3:15
4.	"Falling for Ya"	Phipps	3:12
5.	"Meant to Be"	Lynch; Lee; Mitchell; Phipps; Garrett Clayton	3:45
6.	"Like Me"	Mitchell; Cast; Phipps; Lynch; Lee	3:18
7.	"Meant to Be (Reprise 1)"	Lee; Phipps; Hawk	1:40
8.	"Can't Stop Singing"	Lynch; Mitchell	2:25
9.	"Meant to Be (Reprise 2)"	Lynch; Mitchell	0:34
10.	"Surf's Up"	Lynch; Mitchell; Cast	3:01
11.	"Coolest Cats in Town"	Phipps; Lee; Evigan	2:45
12.	"Surf Crazy Finale"	Cast	2:31
13.	"Cruisin' for a Bruisin'" (Instrumental Version)	Mitch Allan; Jason C. Miller; Nikki Leonti; Evigan	3:15
14.	"Falling For Ya" (Instrumental Version)	Aris Archontis; Chen Neeman	3:12
15.	"Surf's Up" (Instrumental Version)	Ali "Dee" Theodore; Jordan Yaeger; Garrett Kotecki; Alana Da Fonseca	2:58
Total length:			41:49

=== Charts ===
Chart performance for Teen Beach Movie (Soundtrack)
Chart (2013)	Peak position
UK Compilation Albums (OCC)	13
UK Album Downloads (OCC)	36
UK Soundtrack Albums (OCC)	1
US Billboard 200	3
US Kid Albums (Billboard)	1
US Top Soundtracks (Billboard)	1

=== Certifications ===
Region	Certification	Certified units/sales
United States (RIAA)	Gold	500,000^{‡}
^{‡} Sales+streaming figures based on certification alone.

== Release ==
=== Broadcast ===
The film originally premiered after a new episode of Austin and Ally on July 19, 2013, in the United States, Canada, the UK, and Ireland on Disney Channel. It premiered on August 4, 2013, in Southeast Asia and on August 9, 2013, in Australia and New Zealand, both on Disney Channel.

=== Home media ===
Teen Beach Movie was released on DVD on July 19, 2013, exclusively at Walmart, and on July 30 at other American retailers. The film earned $12,519,474 from its domestic home media releases.

The film was made available to stream on Disney+.

== Reception ==
=== Critical response ===
On the review aggregator website Rotten Tomatoes, the film holds an 88% approval rating based on 8 reviews, with average rating of 8.00/10. Metacritic, which uses a weighted average, assigned the film a score of 54 based on 6 reviews, indicating "mixed or average" reviews.

Mike Hale of The New York Times stated that Teen Beach Movie represents Disney Channel's attempt to recapture the success of High School Musical with a high-concept story involving time travel and a 1960s beach movie. Hale found the film's numerous references and influences—ranging from Grease and Back to the Future to Glee and Bride of Frankenstein—to be somewhat derivative but noted that its clever premise and occasional humor make it entertaining, particularly for its target audience. Emily Ashby of Common Sense Media gave the film a score of four stars out of five, saying that while tweens, drawn by familiar Disney stars like Ross Lynch, will enjoy the film's nostalgic, comedic, and romantic elements, parents will appreciate its family-friendly narrative that promotes individuality, self-awareness, and positive relationships.

Brian Lowry of Variety found that while the film includes inventive moments and lively musical sequences, the narrative between these numbers can feel lackluster. Lowry noted that Disney's extensive marketing effort aims to replicate the success of High School Musical, with the film itself serving as part of a larger promotional strategy. Entertainment Weekly gave the film a C grade, saying "The good news? Two tunes in this attempt to reverse-engineer a new High School Musical are decent...But the rest is dull as sand."

=== Ratings ===
The premiere in the United Kingdom had 597,000 viewers. The United States premiere just hours later received 8.4 million viewers during its first airing and 13.5 million viewers in L+7, becoming the second-highest rated Disney Channel Original Movie. The Dance Along version on July 27, 2013, garnered 3.7 million viewers. In Canada, the movie delivered 818,000 viewers. The Australian premiere had 113,000 viewers.

=== Accolades ===
Teen Beach Movie was nominated for Outstanding Directorial Achievement in Children's Programs at the 66th Directors Guild of America Awards. It was nominated for Best Sound Editing - Long Form Musical in Television at the 2014 Golden Reel Awards.

== Sequel ==
On April 27, 2014, the sequel, Teen Beach 2 was announced as slated to premiere in 2015 on Disney Channel, with production set for July 2014 in Puerto Rico. Ross Lynch, Maia Mitchell, Grace Phipps, Garrett Clayton and John DeLuca reprised their roles in the sequel. The remaining actors who portray the bikers and surfers, Jordan Fisher, Chrissie Fit, William Loftis, Kent Boyd, Jessica Lee Keller and Mollee Gray, are also confirmed to return for the sequel. The sequel revolves around the characters from Wet Side Story after the first film's post-credits scene, when they were transported into the real world. Teen Beach 2 premiered June 26, 2015, with 5.8 million viewers. A third movie was never made due to Ross Lynch's contract with Disney ending a couple months after the sequels premiere.
