= Maddy Curley =

American actress and gymnast

- Full name: Madelyn Jane Curley
- Born: December 3, 1981 (age 44) Tallahassee, Florida
- Height: 163 cm (5 ft 4 in)

Gymnastics career
- Country represented: United States

Madelyn Jane Curley (born December 3, 1981) is an American actress and former gymnast. She competed for the North Carolina Tar Heels. She was academic All American for four years.

She attended the University of North Carolina at Chapel Hill, where she belonged to the Alpha Chi Omega sorority.

Curley played gymnast Mina Hoyt in the 2006 film Stick It.

Curley stars in the 2016 gymnastics movie Chalk It Up.

In the 2019 film Terminator: Dark Fate, Curley served as both the body double and stunt double for a younger Sarah Connor in flashback scenes. CGI was used to recreate Linda Hamilton's facial likeness from the early 1990s.
