= Gracie Gillam =

American actress and singer (born 1992)

- Born: May 4, 1992 (age 34); Austin, Texas, U.S.
- Other name: Grace Phipps
- Occupations: Actress, singer, dancer
- Years active: 2010–present
- Spouse: Nat Zang (m. 2023)

Grace Phipps (born May 4, 1992), known professionally as Gracie Gillam, is an American actress, singer, and dancer. She is best known for starring in the Disney Channel Original Movies Teen Beach Movie and Teen Beach 2 as Lela, as well as starring in the fourth season of The Vampire Diaries as April Young.

== Early life ==
Gillam was born in Austin, Texas, to Kate (née Van Gelder) and Gilliam Phipps. She has a younger brother named Liam.

She was raised in Boerne, Texas and San Antonio, Texas. She graduated from Robert E. Lee High School's North East School of the Arts, where she majored in musical theater and graduated summa cum laude. As of 2016, she was an undergraduate student at Columbia University.

In 2010, she won the Las Casas Performing Arts Scholarship Competition. A Los Angeles agent signed Gillam after seeing her star as Rizzo in a theater production of the musical Grease.

== Career ==
=== Acting ===
Following her 2010 high school graduation, Gillam moved to Los Angeles to pursue a career in acting. After seven days there, she landed the prime role as Bee in the DreamWorks 2011 major movie remake of the 1985 comedy horror film Fright Night. That year, she also originated the regular role of Amy in the ABC Family fantasy drama series The Nine Lives of Chloe King. The series was cancelled after one season.

In 2012 through 2013, Gillam was cast as April Young, a recurring character in The CW's supernatural drama The Vampire Diaries, and appeared in 10 episodes of the fourth season.

In 2013, Gillam appeared as cute biker girl Lela, in an Annette Funicello impression, in Teen Beach Movie, a Disney Channel Original Movie, singing and dancing along with Ross Lynch and Maia Mitchell. The movie, with an audience of 13.5 million viewers, was the second-highest rated cable movie in television history. Phipps had a number of featured solos, including the song "Falling for Ya".

Also in 2013, Gillam appeared in three episodes of the ABC TV comedy series Baby Daddy as Megan, the love interest of Ben (Jean-Luc Bilodeau), in the fantasy-horror TV series Supernatural as Hael, and in the short The Signal as Zoe. The following year, Phipps appeared in Disney's teen sitcom Austin & Ally episode "Directors & Divas", as diva movie star Brandy Braxton.

In 2015, Gillam starred and reprised her role as fiercely independent and brassy biker chick Lela in a sequel teen musical, Teen Beach 2, along with Ross Lynch, Maia Mitchell, Garrett Clayton, and John DeLuca. It premiered with 5.8 million viewers, as the most-watched cable movie of 2015.

Also in 2015, Gillam starred in the horror movie Dark Summer, playing the part of Mona Wilson. She also played the lead role of a troubled teen cheerleader named Kaitlin in the emotional horror/slasher film Some Kind of Hate, which was featured in the 2015 Stanley Film Festival, the Fantasia International Film Festival, and FrightFest.

That year, she also appeared in three episodes of the black comedy-horror TV series Scream Queens on Fox as Mandy, and was a beauty gangleader named Alice in Paul Solet's punk rock revenge segment of horror comedy Tales of Halloween. In addition, she appeared in the police procedural drama TV series CSI: Cyber as Vanessa Gillerman, and in the police procedural TV series Hawaii Five-0 as Erica Young. She was also featured on the cover of the June/July 2015 issue of Girls' Life.

She appeared on the Syfy TV series Z Nation as Sgt. Lilly from 2017 to 2018.

=== Music ===
The Teen Beach Movie soundtrack, which entered the Billboard 200 chart at number eight in July 2013, was released featuring songs performed by Gillam, including her as a main artist in the song "Falling for Ya" and featured in the songs "Cruisin' for a Bruisin'", "Like Me", "Meant to Be", and "Coolest Cats in Town". "Cruisin' for a Bruisin'" and "Falling for Ya" topped Billboard's Kid Digital charts for weeks, with "Falling for Ya" reaching number 25 on the Heatseekers Songs chart and number 66 on the Hot Digital Songs chart.

In 2014, Phipps appeared in the Austin & Ally episode "Directors & Divas" and performed "The Pilot and the Mermaid" with Ross Lynch.

In 2015, her song "Gotta Be Me" from Teen Beach 2 was nominated in the Teen Choice Awards as the Choice Song from a Movie or TV Show; she sang the song with Ross Lynch, Maia Mitchell, Garrett Clayton, John Deluca, and Jordan Fisher.

== Personal life ==
Before 2017, Gillam was credited professionally under her birth name, Grace Phipps. She revealed that the change was due to the fact that she had "always wanted a stage name" and is based on "Gilliam," a family name.

In November 2017, Gillam began dating actor and Z Nation co-star Nat Zang. In January 2022, Gillam announced their engagement. They were married in May 2023 in Arizona.

== Filmography ==
Film
Year	Title	Role	Notes
2011	Fright Night	Bee	
2013	The Signal	Zoe	Short
2015	Dark Summer	Mona Wilson	
2015	Some Kind of Hate	Kaitlin	
2015	Tales of Halloween	Alice	
2019	The Lost Weekend	Maggie Mae	Short
2021	Superhost	Rebecca	
2023	Murder at the Murder Mystery Party	Jade Jensen	
2024	Who's Watching	Krista	

Television
Year	Title	Role	Notes
2011	The Nine Lives of Chloe King	Amy Tiffany Martin	Main role
2012–13	The Vampire Diaries	April Young	Recurring role
2013–15	Baby Daddy	Megan	Recurring role
2013	Teen Beach Movie	Lela	TV film; Disney Channel Original Movie
2013	Supernatural	Hael	Episode: "I Think I'm Gonna Like It Here"
2014	Austin & Ally	Brandy Braxton	Episode: "Directors & Divas"
2015	Hawaii Five-0	Erica Young	Episode: "Wawahi moeʻuhane (Broken Dreams)"
2015	CSI: Cyber	Vanessa Gillerman	Episode: "Selfie 2.0"
2015	Teen Beach 2	Lela	TV film; Disney Channel Original Movie
2015	Scream Queens	Young Mandy Greenwell	Recurring role
2017–18	Z Nation	Sgt Lilly	Main cast (Season 4–5)
2020	Stolen In Plain Sight	Melissa	TV film: Lifetime Movie Network Original Movie

== Discography ==
=== Soundtrack albums ===
List of albums, with selected chart positions
Title	Album details	Peak chart positions								
Title	Album details	US	US OST	BEL	CAN	FRA	NL	NZ	SPA	UK
Teen Beach Movie	Released: July 16, 2013; Formats: CD, digital download; Label: Walt Disney	3	1	176	14	76	56	30	15	36
Teen Beach 2	Released: June 23, 2015; Formats: CD, digital download; Label: Walt Disney	10	1	—	—	129	—	—	67	—
"—" denotes releases that did not chart or were not released in that territory.

=== Singles ===
List of singles, with selected chart positions
Title	Year	Peak chart positions				Certifications	Album
Title	Year	US	US Heat.	IRL	UK	Certifications	Album
"Cruisin' for a Bruisin'" (with Ross Lynch & Jason Evigan)	2013	82	6	90	117	RIAA: Gold	Teen Beach Movie
"—" denotes releases that did not chart or were not released in that territory.

=== Other charted songs ===
List of singles, with selected chart positions
Title	Year	Peak chart positions					Certifications	Album
Title	Year	US Bub.	US Heat.	US Kid	US Holiday	UK	Certifications	Album
"Like Me" (with Ross Lynch, Maia Mitchell, & Spencer Lee)	2013	1	10	3	—	177		Teen Beach Movie
"Falling For Ya"	2013	23	2	—	—	—	RIAA: Gold	Teen Beach Movie
"Meant To Be" (with Ross Lynch, Maia Mitchell, Spencer Lee and Garrett Clayton)	2013	—	—	5	—	—		Teen Beach Movie
"Coolest Cats In Town" (with Spencer Lee and Jason Evigan	2013	—	—	20	—	—		Teen Beach Movie
"Gotta Be Me" (with Ross Lynch, Maia Mitchell, Garrett Clayton, John DeLuca & Jordan Fisher)	2015	23	—	3	—	—		Teen Beach 2
"Best Summer Ever" (with Ross Lynch, Maia Mitchell, Garrett Clayton, Jordan Fisher, John DeLuca and Chrissie Fit)	2015	—	—	5	—	—		Teen Beach 2
"That's How We Do" (with Ross Lynch, Maia Mitchell, Garrett Clayton, Jordan Fisher and John DeLuca)		—	—	4	—	—		Teen Beach 2
"—" denotes releases that did not chart or were not released in that territory.
