= John DeLuca =

American actor and singer

- Born: Longmeadow, Massachusetts, U.S.
- Education: Fordham University
- Occupations: Actor; singer
- Years active: 2009–present

John DeLuca is an American actor and singer who is known for his role as Butchy in the Disney Channel Original Movie, Teen Beach Movie, as well as its sequel Teen Beach 2, and as Anthony in coming-of-age comedy Staten Island Summer. He also guest starred with Maia Mitchell on an episode of Disney Channel's show, Jessie, along with a guest appearance on Wizards of Waverly Place.

== Early life ==
DeLuca was born in Longmeadow, Massachusetts, the eldest of 3 boys. He is of Italian, Spanish and Irish origin. Growing up, DeLuca was an athlete. In his senior year of high school, DeLuca decided to try out for high school production of The Wizard of Oz, where he auditioned for the role of Scarecrow. After he got the part, he decided to pursue acting. He graduated from Longmeadow High School. DeLuca is a graduate of Fordham University in New York where he was a Theatre major.

== Career ==
In 2009, DeLuca had his acting and TV debut, when he guest starred in shows Ugly Betty and 30 Rock. In 2011, he guest starred in TV shows Lights Out and Wizards of Waverly Place. That same year he also starred as Bucky Buchanan in Disney Channel unsold pilot Zombies and Cheerleaders. In early 2012, DeLuca guest starred in an episode of The Secret Life of the American Teenager.

In 2012, DeLuca had a film debut in We Made This Movie, where he played the role of Jeff. Later, he guest-starred in an episode of Sketchy. In December 2012, he had a role as Colin Hemingway in the indie drama movie Hemingway. In early 2013, DeLuca guest starred with Maia Mitchell on Disney show Jessie. In 2013, he landed the role of Butchy in a hit Disney Channel Original Movie, Teen Beach Movie. The movie was directed by Jeffrey Hornaday and earned 13.5 million total viewers on Disney Channel. He played the role of Butchy, the leader of the biker gang in the movie within the movie. Also in 2013, DeLuca had a recurring role in the TV series Twisted, as Cole Farell. He had a role in short film It Remains.

In 2014, he guest starred on an episode of Instant Mom. In 2015, DeLuca reprised his role as Butchy, leader of the biker gang, in the Disney Channel Original Movie, Teen Beach 2 sequel to the hit movie Teen Beach Movie. The film was directed by Jeffrey Hornaday and premiered to 7.5 million total viewers on Disney Channel. He had a main role in coming-of-age comedy Staten Island Summer as Anthony DiBuono, Italian lifeguard who dreams of joining the Navy. The film was directed by Rhys Thomas and written by Colin Jost and had a limited release in theater before premiering worldwide on Netflix on July 30, 2015.

On April 4, 2016, it was announced that DeLuca had joined the cast of ABC's soap opera, General Hospital. His character, Aaron Roland, started recurring on April 27, 2016. DeLuca guest starred in multiple season 4 episodes as Jeremy in Hulu's drama East Los High. He played the role of Brett in web released short films Free Period. The short films were released on Disney Channel's YouTube page.

He starred as Chet in the family friendly gymnastic movie Chalk It Up alongside Maddy Curley and Nikki SooHoo. The movie was released on September 13, 2016, on iTunes, Amazon and Google Play. He also starred as Wade in the family friendly movie All Hallows' Eve co-starring Lexi Giovagnoli and Ashley Argota. The movie was released on digital hd on September 27, 2016. On October 6, 2016, DeLuca guest starred in an episode of How to Get Away with Murder. He also guest starred in an episode of Comrade Detective, where he voiced the character Young Nikita.

In 2017, he starred as Maverick in the short film Lara Croft Is My Girlfriend alongside his then girlfriend Lidia Rivera. Later that year, he also appeared as Bobby in the Go90's romantic comedy series Relationship Status. DeLuca guest starred as Billy in the horror web series Welcome To Daisyland. He also guest starred as Rod in an episode of FX's American Horror Story: 1984. DeLuca had a supporting role as Davey Wallace in Hallmark Channel Original Movie A Merry Christmas Match opposite Lindsey Gort. He guest starred as Vinny Linguini (voice) in Disney's Muppet Babies.

In 2020, DeLuca played the supporting role of Mario in the independent thriller Spree, which had its world premiere on January 24, 2020, at Sundance Film Festival. He starred as Josh Grant in the Lifetime original movie Killer Dream Home alongside Maiara Walsh. In 2021, he played the role of Bobby in the comedy film Donny's Bar Mitzvah. In 2022, he played the role of Christian in the short film The Bacheliar.

In 2023, DeLuca starred as Anthony in the horror short film LOAB alongside Siri Miller. Later that year, he played the role of AJ in the comedy short film 'ZA. In 2025, DeLuca played the role of A.J. Berg in the horror film Skillhouse.

== Personal life ==
DeLuca announced his engagement to Cassandra on December 30, 2025.

== Filmography ==
=== Film ===
Year	Title	Role	Notes
2012	We Made This Movie	Jeff	Minor Role, Film debut
2012	Hemingway	Colin Hemingway	
2013	Teen Beach Movie	Butchy	Disney Channel Original Movie
2015	It Remains	Party Goer	Short Film
2015	Teen Beach 2	Butchy	Disney Channel Original Movie
2015	Staten Island Summer	Anthony DiBuono	
2016	Chalk It Up	Chet	
2016	All Hallows' Eve	Wade	
2017	Lara Croft Is My Girlfriend	Maverick	Short Film
2020	Spree	Mario	
2020	The Boys in the Band	Parking Attendant	cameo
2021	Donny's Bar Mitzvah	Bobby	
2022	The Bacheliar	Christian	Short Film
2023	LOAB	Anthony	Short Film
2023	'ZA	AJ	Short Film
2025	Skillhouse	A.J. Berg	

=== Television ===
Year	Title	Role	Notes
2009	30 Rock	Lead Singer	Episode: "Into the Crevasse" (S 4:Ep 2); Uncredited
2009	Ugly Betty	Kevin	Episode: "Backseat Betty" (S 4:Ep 6)
2011	Zombies and Cheerleaders	Bucky Buchanan	unsold Disney Channel pilot
2011	Lights Out	Brent	Episodes: "Pilot" (S 1:Ep 1); "Head Games" (S 1:Ep 8)
2011	Wizards of Waverly Place	Tommy	Episode: "Rock Around the Clock" (S 4:Ep 26)
2012	The Secret Life of the American Teenager	Guy	Episode: "The Beach Is Back" (S 4:Ep 18)
2012	Sketchy	Bernie	Episode: "MTV Presents: Weekend at Bernie's" (S 2:Ep 8)
2013	Jessie	Timmy "McD" Finkleberg	Episode: "Jessie's Big Break" (S 2:Ep 10)
2013	Twisted	Cole Farrell	Recurring
2014	Instant Mom	Zack	Episode: "James Goes Pro" (S 2:Ep 6)
2016	General Hospital	Aaron Roland	Recurring
2016	East Los High	Jeremy	Recurring (Season 4)
2016	How to Get Away with Murder	Guy	Episode: "Always Bet Black" (S 3:Ep 3)
2017	Comrade Detective	Young Nikita (voice)	Episode: "Two Films for One Ticket" (S 1:Ep 4)
2017	Relationship Status	Bobby	Episode: "Range" (S 3:Ep 1); "Grown Ups" (S 3:Ep 5)
2019	Welcome To Daisyland	Billy	Episode:"Episode 2" web series
2019	American Horror Story: 1984	Rod	Episode: "True Killers" (S 9:Ep 4)
2019	A Merry Christmas Match	Davey Wallace	Hallmark Channel Original Movie
2019	Muppet Babies	Vinny Linguini (voice)	Episode: "My Brother Vinny"
2020	Killer Dream Home	Josh Grant	Lifetime Original Movie

=== Video games ===
Year	Title	Role	Source
2018	Epic Seven	Cidd, Rikoris	
2020	Mafia: Definitive Edition	Additional Voices	
2022	Horizon Forbidden West	Conover	

== Awards and nominations ==
Year	Award	Category	Work	Result	ref
2015	Teen Choice Awards	Choice Music: Song from a Movie or TV Show	Teen Beach 2: Shared with Cast	Nominated	

== Discography ==
=== Soundtrack albums ===
List of albums, with selected details
Title	Album details	Notes
Teen Beach Movie	Released: July 16, 2013; Label: Walt Disney; Formats: CD, digital download	Soundtrack for Teen Beach Movie
Teen Beach 2	Released: June 23, 2015; Label: Walt Disney; Formats: CD, digital download	Soundtrack for Teen Beach 2
