= Chrissie Fit =

American actress (born 1984)

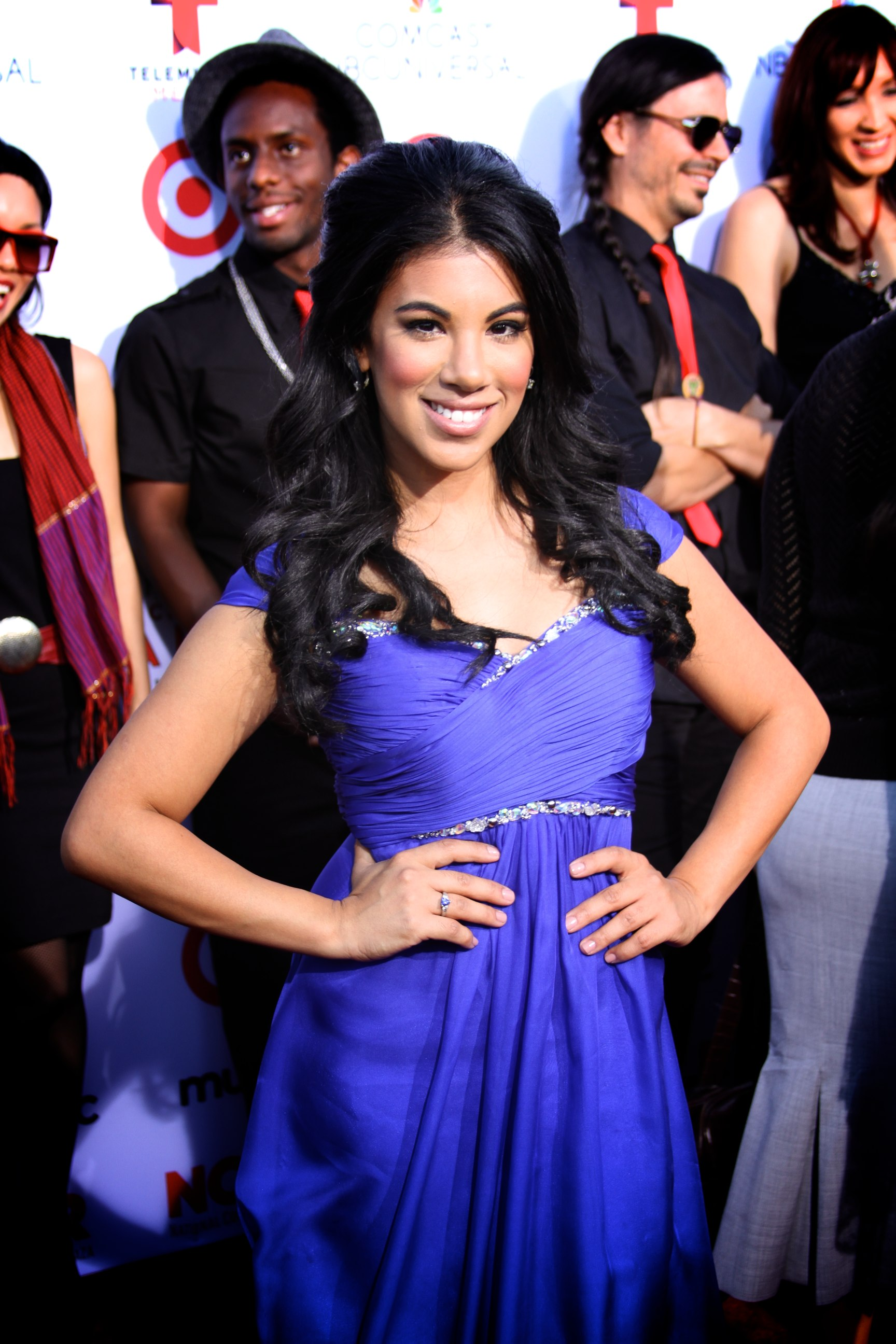
- Fit in 2013
- Born: April 3, 1984 (age 41); Miami, Florida, U.S.
- Occupation(s): Singer, actress
- Years active: 2004–present

Chrissie Fit (born April 3, 1984) is an American actress and singer. In 2007, Fit rose to prominence after she was cast as the character Mercedes Juarez in the medical drama, General Hospital. She also played the roles of CheeChee in the DCOMs Teen Beach Movie and Teen Beach 2, and Florencia "Flo" Fuentes in Pitch Perfect 2 and Pitch Perfect 3.

== Early life ==
Fit was born in Miami, Florida, and raised in nearby Hialeah, Florida. She is of Cuban heritage. She attended Florida International University where she was a member of the Theta Xi chapter of Alpha Xi Delta.

== Career ==
Fit made her acting debut on the 2006 Nickelodeon television series, Zoey 101, in an unspecified role. She made her first recurring role on the American daytime television medical drama, General Hospital, where she played Mercedes from 2007 until 2012. She also wrote, directed and starred in the web series, The Subpranos, playing the role of Denise Flores de la Rosa. She also appeared in episodes of Southland, House, General Hospital: Night Shift and The Middleman. In 2012, Fit returned to acting with Filly Brown, where she played Lupe Tonorio.

In 2013, she was cast as CheeChee in the Disney Channel Original Movie, Teen Beach Movie. In 2015, she played Florencia "Flo" Fuentes in Pitch Perfect 2 and reprised her role as CheeChee in the DCOM Teen Beach 2. She later returned as Florencia in 2017's Pitch Perfect 3.

== Philanthropy ==
Fit is a Days for Girls International Ambassador, using her platform to champion menstrual solutions and health education for women and girls all over the world. She co-wrote and performed a song, "All About Them Days (for Girls)" to support the organization's mission in March 2018.

== Filmography ==
=== Film ===
Year	Title	Role	Notes
2007	This Is Culdesac	Student #2	
2009	Crossing Over	Student #3	
2012	Filly Brown	Lupe Tonorio	
2013	Sake-Bomb	Edie	
2013	The Gelephant	Lisa	
2013	It Remains	Bessie	Short film; also writer
2014	Crosstown	Other Chola	
2015	Pitch Perfect 2	Florencia "Flo" Fuentes	
2017	Pitch Perfect 3	Florencia "Flo" Fuentes	
2020	All My Life	Amanda Fletcher	
2021	Women Is Losers	Marty	
2023	Parachute	Denise	
2023	Cora Bora	Cristina	

=== Television ===
Year	Title	Role	Notes
2006	Zoey 101	Unspecified Role	Episode: "The Great Vince Blake"
2007	General Hospital: Night Shift	Lupe Rosales	3 episodes
2007–2012	General Hospital	Mercedes	Recurring role, 37 episodes
2008	The Middleman	Shannon Faris	Episode: "The Ectoplasmic Panhellenic Investigation"
2008	House	Girl	Episode: "Emancipation"
2009	Catherine and Annie	Kristy	Television movie
2010	The Subpranos	Denise Flores de la Rosa	10 episodes; also director and producer
2010	My Roommate the...	Niqi	Episode: "Guido"
2011	Southland	Estella	Episode: "Let It Snow"
2011	Torchwood	Assistant	Episode: "Rendition"
2013	Teen Beach Movie	CheeChee	Disney Channel Original Movie
2014	Disney's Win, Lose or Draw	Herself	Contestant, 5 episodes
2015	Resident Advisors	Beth	Episode: "Sexiled"
2015	Teen Beach 2	CheeChee	Disney Channel Original Movie
2016	Mary + Jane	Alyssa	Episode: "Sn**chelorette"
2016–2019	Milo Murphy's Law	Amanda Lopez	Voice role; recurring (16 episodes)
2017–2020	Elena of Avalor	Princess Valentina	Voice role; recurring
2019	Charmed	Effie	Episode: "Witch Perfect"
2019	I'm Sorry	Amber	Episode: "Miss Diana Ross"
2020–2023	Awkwafina Is Nora from Queens	Melanie	Recurring role
2020	Pete the Cat	Gustavo's Mama	Episode: "Parents' Day Surprise"
2021	I Know What You Did Last Summer	Kelly Craft	Recurring role
2021	Animaniacs	Cora	Voice role; 2 episodes

=== Music videos ===
Year	Title	Artist
2016	"Our Fight Song"	Various Artists
2017	"Freedom! '90" / "Cups"	The Bellas from Pitch Perfect 3 and the Top 12 contestants of The Voice season 13
2018	"Give Me Your Hand"	Shannon K
2020	"Love On Top"	Cast of Pitch Perfect

=== Web ===
Year	Title	Role	Notes
2019	Liza on Demand	Katie	Episode "Gentrification: The Musical"

== Theater ==
Year	Title	Role	Notes
2015	Disney's Peter Pan JR	Tinker Bell	
