= Garrett Clayton =

American actor and singer

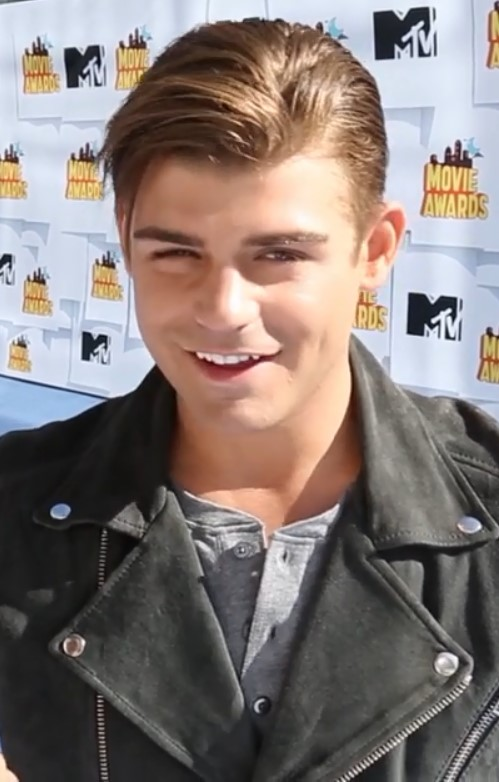
- Clayton at the 2015 MTV Movie Awards
- Born: Gary Michael Clayton; March 19, 1991 (age 35); Dearborn, Michigan, U.S.
- Occupations: Actor; singer
- Years active: 2008–present
- Spouse: Blake Knight (m. 2021)

Gary Michael "Garrett" Clayton (born March 19, 1991) is an American actor and singer. He is known for portraying Tanner in the 2013 Disney Channel movie Teen Beach Movie and its 2015 sequel Teen Beach 2, and other film, television, and stage roles.

== Life and career ==
Gary Michael Clayton was born March 19, 1991, in Dearborn, Michigan. He has Lebanese heritage. He began acting at Crestwood High School in Dearborn Heights, Michigan, performing in many of the drama club's productions. He later attended Oakland University, where he studied musical theater.

After being told by casting directors that his name "sounded too old", he adopted the stage name of Garrett Clayton.

In 2010, he made appearances on Days of Our Lives and Shake It Up. In December 2012, he appeared in the Lifetime movie Holiday Spin, co-starring Ralph Macchio, as Blake, a rebellious teen forced to live with his father after his mother is killed in a car accident.

He was cast in 2013 in the role of Tanner in Disney's musical Teen Beach Movie, playing a cool but vacuous surfer who is "a mix between Frankie Avalon and Link from Hairspray". The film was directed by Jeffrey Hornaday and was filmed in Puerto Rico and was first broadcast in July 2013. It co-stars Ross Lynch, Maia Mitchell, and Grace Phipps.

He had a recurring role in the latter half of the first season of The Fosters. In 2016, he portrayed gay porn star Brent Corrigan in the film King Cobra, with James Franco and Christian Slater, and played the role of Link Larkin in the NBC television broadcast of Hairspray Live! He starred as Brady Mannion in the horror-thriller film Don't Hang Up, which was released in theaters in February 2017. Also in 2017, Clayton appeared on stage at the Pasadena Playhouse as Luke alongside Al Pacino and Judith Light in a six-week run of Dotson Rader's play God Looked Away, about the later life of Tennessee Williams.

== Personal life ==
In August 2018, Clayton came out as gay and revealed he had been in a long-term relationship with boyfriend Blake Knight since 2011. (Note: "When I read the script for REACH, I immediately knew it was a film I had to be a part of. I have personally dealt with suicide within my own family, intense bullying in high school, and – on top of it all – myself and the man I've been in a relationship with for a long time (@hrhblakeknight) have both experienced shootings within our hometown school systems, and have witnessed the heartache that takes place in affected communities after such tragic events." — Garrett Clayton) Clayton came out in his personal life at the age of 16, but was told by representatives not to come out publicly for the sake of his career after moving to Hollywood at the age of 19.

In January 2019, Clayton announced that he and Knight had become engaged a year prior. In September 2021, the couple married at an outdoor, garden party themed wedding in Los Angeles, which was officiated by Clayton's King Cobra co-star Alicia Silverstone.

== Filmography ==
=== Film ===
Year	Title	Role	Notes
2008	The Tower	Zombie	
2009	Magic Mentah	Sander	
2010	Virginia	Mormon boy No. 2	
2011	Love, Gloria	Tad	
2012	The Oogieloves in the Big Balloon Adventure	Diner dancer	
2016	Welcome to Willits	Zack	
2016	Don't Hang Up	Brady Mannion	
2016	King Cobra	Brent Corrigan	
2016	Alien Hunter	Zack	
2018	Between Worlds	Mike	
2018	The Last Breakfast Club	Brian	
2018	Reach	Steven	
2019	Peel	Chad	
2021	The Adventures of Bunny Bravo	Papaya	
2023	The Mattachine Family	Jake	
TBA	Our Man	Matthew	Post-production

=== Television ===
Year	Title	Role	Notes
2010	Days of Our Lives	Eli	Episode: "29 April 2010"
2010	Shake It Up	Dylan	Episode: "Party It Up"
2012	Holiday Spin	Blake	Television film
2013	The Client List	Billy	Episode: "What Kind of Fool Do You Think I Am"
2013	Jessie	Earl	Episode: "The Blind Date, the Cheapskate, and the Primate"
2013	Teen Beach Movie	Tanner	Television film
2014; 2016	The Fosters	Chase	Recurring role (season 1); guest role (season 3; episode: "The Show")
2015	100 Things to Do Before High School	Stephen Powers	Episode: "Survive the Virus Attack Trapped in the Last Home Base Station on Earth Thing"
2015	Teen Beach 2	Tanner	Television film
2016	The Real O'Neals	Ricky	Episode: "The Real Lent"
2016	Hairspray Live!	Link Larkin	Television special
2020	World's Funniest Animals	Guest	1 episode
2022	The Fairly OddParents: Fairly Odder	Dustan Lumberlake	3 episodes

== Stage ==
Year	Title	Role	Venue	Notes
2014–2015; 2017	Sleeping Beauty and Her Winter Knight	Prince Phillip	Pasadena Playhouse	
2015	Cruel Intentions: The Musical	Greg	Rockwell Table & Stage	
2017	God Looked Away	Luke	Pasadena Playhouse	
2019, 2022	It: A Musical Parody	Pennywise	Rockwell Table & Stage, Chelsea Table & Stage	Los Angeles & New York Premieres
2023	The Rocky Horror Show	Dr. Frank N. Furter	OFC Creations Theatre Center	
2025–2026	Dr. Seuss' How The Grinch Stole Christmas! The Musical	The Grinch	OFC Creations Theatre Center	
