= Jeffrey Hornaday =

American choreographer and film director

- Born: May 3, 1956 (age 70); Los Angeles, California, U.S.
- Other names: Jeffrey D. Hornaday, Jeff Hornaday
- Occupations: Director, choreographer
- Known for: A Chorus Line, Teen Beach Movie
- Partner: Lesley Ann Warren (1977–1985)

Jeffrey Hornaday (born May 3, 1956) is an American choreographer and film director. He has choreographed films such as Flashdance, Dick Tracy, Captain Eo and A Chorus Line .

Hornaday was nominated for a Directors Guild of America Award for his direction of the 2011 Disney Channel original movie Geek Charming. He received a second Directors Guild of America Award nomination for his direction of Disney's 2013 movie Teen Beach Movie which is the highest viewed non-sequel movie in cable television history. In 2003 he was nominated for the MTV Video Music Award for Best Choreography for adapting his dance routines from Flashdance for Jennifer Lopez in her music video I'm Glad. Hornaday has also directed multiple world tours for entertainers such as Madonna and Paul McCartney. Hornaday created specialized marketing campaigns for companies such as Sony and Nike, and has served as creative director for events featuring President Bill Clinton and President Barack Obama.

== Personal life ==
From 1977 to 1985, Hornaday lived with actress Lesley Ann Warren. Hornaday dated Madonna for a short period in early 1989, between Madonna's separation from Sean Penn and emerging relationship with Warren Beatty.

== Filmography ==
=== As actor ===
- The Best Little Whorehouse in Texas (1982, as Aggie)
- Walt Disney's Wonderful World of Color episode Double Switch (1987, as Choreographer)

=== As choreographer ===
- Flashdance (1983)
- D.C. Cab (1983)
- Romancing the Stone (1984, as Jeffrey D. Hornaday)
- Streets of Fire (1984)
- A Chorus Line (1985)
- Captain EO (1986)
- Tango & Cash (1989, as Jeff Hornaday)
- Dick Tracy (1990)
- The Marrying Man (1991)
- Life Stinks (1991)
- Carlito's Way (1993)
- Bird of Prey (1995)
- Sweet Jane (1998)

=== As choreographer and director ===
- ABC Afterschool Specials, episode Out of Step (1984)
- Teen Beach Movie (2013)
- Teen Beach 2 (2015)

=== As director ===
- CBS Summer Playhouse, episode Sawdust (1987)
- Madonna: Ciao, Italia! - Live from Italy documentary (1988, concert performances)
- Shout (1991)
- Geek Charming (2011)

=== Miscellaneous roles ===
- Portrait of a Showgirl (1982, as production assistant)
- Madonna: Ciao, Italia! - Live from Italy documentary (1988, as stage director)
- Madonna: The Girlie Show (1993, as production stager, stage producer)

== Awards ==
- MTV Video Music Award for Best Choreography for I'm Glad (2003, nominated)
- Directors Guild of America Award for Best Director for Geek Charming (2012, nominated)
