= List of awards and nominations received by the Chainsmokers =

The Chainsmokers awards and nominations
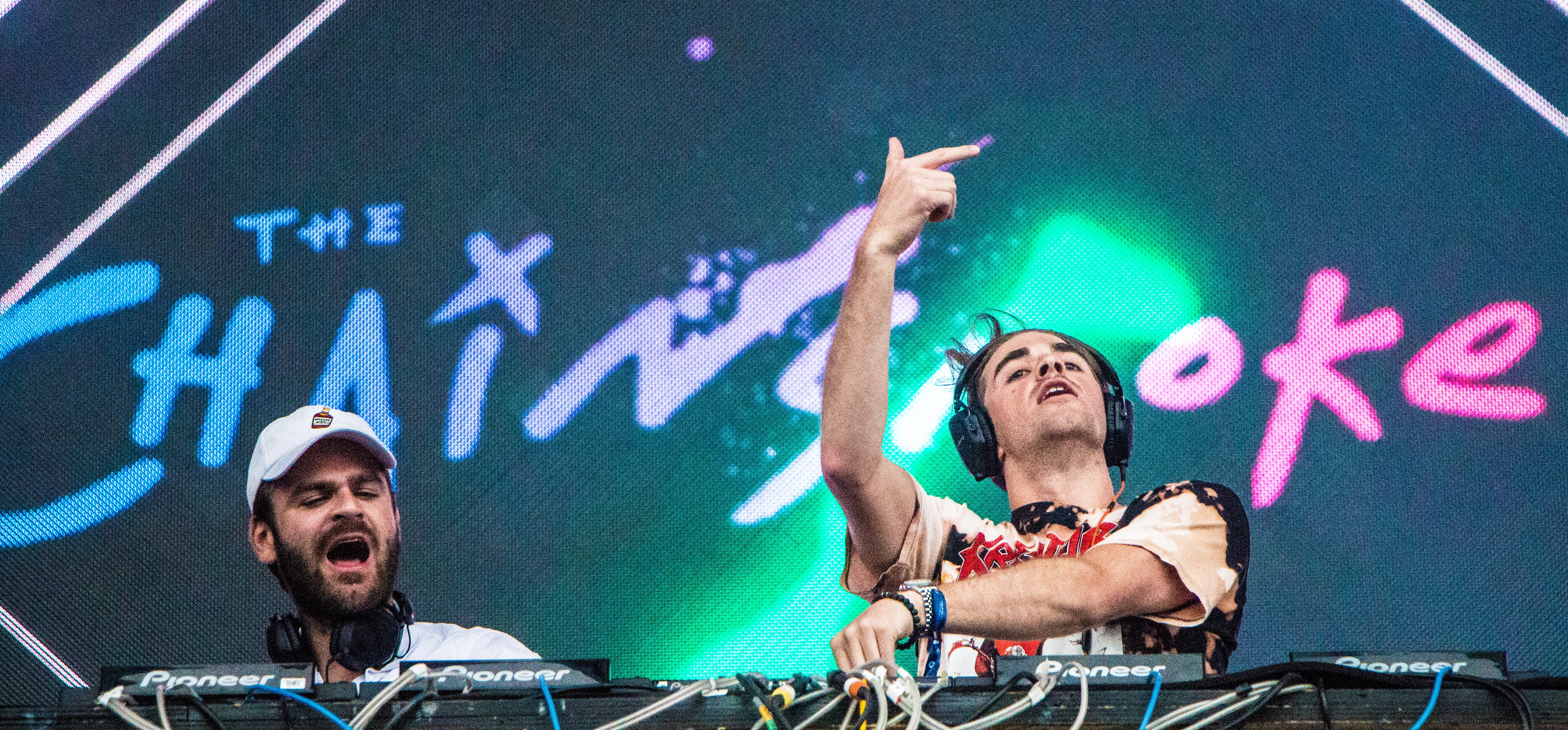
- The Chainsmokers performing at the VELD Music Festival in 2016
Awards and nominations
Award	Wins	Nominations
American Music Awards	2	12
APRA Awards	0	1
ASCAP Pop Music Awards	3	3
Billboard Music Awards	10	36
BMI Pop Awards	1	1
DJ Awards	0	1
Electronic Dance Music Awards	2	18
Electronic Music Awards	0	3
Gaygalan Awards	0	1
Global Awards	0	1
Grammy Awards	1	5
Hungarian Music Awards	0	1
iHeartRadio MMVAs	0	3
iHeartRadio Music Awards	10	23
International Dance Music Awards	2	7
Japan Gold Disc Awards	2	2
Joox Thailand Music Awards	0	1
Latin American Music Awards	0	1
Lo Nuestro Awards	0	1
Los 40 Music Awards	0	2
Melon Music Awards	0	1
MTV Europe Music Awards	1	7
MTV Italian Music Awards	1	2
MTV MIAW Awards	0	2
MTV Video Music Awards	1	7
MTV Video Music Awards Japan	1	1
MTV Woodies	1	1
Myx Music Awards	1	1
New Music Awards	1	4
Nickelodeon Kids' Choice Awards	0	5
NME Awards	0	1
NRJ DJ Awards	2	3
NRJ Music Awards	0	4
People's Choice Awards	0	2
Pollstar Awards	0	1
Premios Juventud	0	2
Radio Disney Music Awards	0	4
RTHK International Pop Poll Awards	4	4
Streamy Awards	0	1
Swiss Music Awards	0	2
Teen Choice Awards	1	14
Telehit Awards	0	2
UK Music Video Awards	0	2
Urban Music Awards	0	1
WDM Radio Awards	2	7

Totals (Note: Certain award groups do not simply award one winner. They acknowledge several different recipients, have runners-up, and have third place. Since this is a specific recognition and is different from losing an award, runner-up mentions are considered wins in this award tally. For simplification and to avoid errors, each award in this list has been presumed to have had a prior nomination.)
- Wins: 49
- Nominations: 204

The following is a list of awards and nominations received by American DJ/producer duo the Chainsmokers.

== Awards and nominations ==
Awards and nominations received by the Chainsmokers
Award	Year (Note: Indicates the year of ceremony. Each year is linked to the article about the awards held that year, wherever possible.)	Nominee/work	Category	Result	Ref.
American Music Awards	2016	The Chainsmokers	New Artist of the Year	Nominated	
American Music Awards	2016	The Chainsmokers	Favorite Duo or Group – Pop/Rock	Nominated	
American Music Awards	2016	The Chainsmokers	Favorite Artist – Electronic Dance Music	Won	
American Music Awards	2016	"Don't Let Me Down" (featuring Daya)	Collaboration of the Year	Nominated	
American Music Awards	2017	The Chainsmokers	Artist of the Year	Nominated	
American Music Awards	2017	The Chainsmokers	Favorite Duo or Group – Pop/Rock	Nominated	
American Music Awards	2017	The Chainsmokers	Favorite Artist – Electronic Dance Music	Won	
American Music Awards	2017	"Closer" (featuring Halsey)	Collaboration of the Year	Nominated	
American Music Awards	2017	"Closer" (featuring Halsey)	Favorite Song – Pop/Rock	Nominated	
American Music Awards	2018	The Chainsmokers	Favorite Artist – Electronic Dance Music	Nominated	
American Music Awards	2019	The Chainsmokers	Favorite Artist – Electronic Dance Music	Nominated	
American Music Awards	2022	The Chainsmokers	Favorite Artist – Electronic Dance Music	Nominated	
APRA Awards	2018	"Something Just Like This" (with Coldplay)	International Work of the Year	Nominated	
ASCAP Pop Music Awards	2018	"Closer" (featuring Halsey)	Winning Songs	Won	
ASCAP Pop Music Awards	2018	"Paris"	Winning Songs	Won	
ASCAP Pop Music Awards	2018	"Something Just Like This" (with Coldplay)	Winning Songs	Won	
Billboard Music Awards	2016	The Chainsmokers	Top Dance/Electronic Artist	Nominated	
Billboard Music Awards	2016	"Roses" (featuring Rozes)	Top Dance/Electronic Song	Nominated	
Billboard Music Awards	2017	The Chainsmokers	Top Artist	Nominated	
Billboard Music Awards	2017	The Chainsmokers	Chart Achievement	Nominated	
Billboard Music Awards	2017	The Chainsmokers	Top Duo/Group	Nominated	
Billboard Music Awards	2017	The Chainsmokers	Top Hot 100 Artist	Nominated	
Billboard Music Awards	2017	The Chainsmokers	Top Song Sales Artist	Nominated	
Billboard Music Awards	2017	The Chainsmokers	Top Radio Songs Artist	Nominated	
Billboard Music Awards	2017	The Chainsmokers	Top Streaming Artist	Nominated	
Billboard Music Awards	2017	The Chainsmokers	Top Dance/Electronic Artist	Won	
Billboard Music Awards	2017	"Closer" (featuring Halsey)	Top Hot 100 Song	Won	
Billboard Music Awards	2017	"Closer" (featuring Halsey)	Top Selling Song	Nominated	
Billboard Music Awards	2017	"Closer" (featuring Halsey)	Top Radio Song	Nominated	
Billboard Music Awards	2017	"Closer" (featuring Halsey)	Top Streaming Song (Audio)	Nominated	
Billboard Music Awards	2017	"Closer" (featuring Halsey)	Top Streaming Song (Video)	Nominated	
Billboard Music Awards	2017	"Closer" (featuring Halsey)	Top Collaboration	Won	
Billboard Music Awards	2017	"Closer" (featuring Halsey)	Top Dance/Electronic Song	Won	
Billboard Music Awards	2017	"Don't Let Me Down" (featuring Daya)	Top Hot 100 Song	Nominated	
Billboard Music Awards	2017	"Don't Let Me Down" (featuring Daya)	Top Selling Song	Nominated	
Billboard Music Awards	2017	"Don't Let Me Down" (featuring Daya)	Top Radio Song	Nominated	
Billboard Music Awards	2017	"Don't Let Me Down" (featuring Daya)	Top Collaboration	Nominated	
Billboard Music Awards	2017	"Don't Let Me Down" (featuring Daya)	Top Dance/Electronic Song	Nominated	
Billboard Music Awards	2017	Bouquet	Top Dance/Electronic Album	Nominated	
Billboard Music Awards	2017	Collage	Top Dance/Electronic Album	Nominated	
Billboard Music Awards	2018	The Chainsmokers	Top Duo/Group	Nominated	
Billboard Music Awards	2018	The Chainsmokers	Top Dance/Electronic Artist	Won	
Billboard Music Awards	2018	"Something Just Like This" (with Coldplay)	Top Radio Song	Nominated	
Billboard Music Awards	2018	"Something Just Like This" (with Coldplay)	Top Collaboration	Nominated	
Billboard Music Awards	2018	"Something Just Like This" (with Coldplay)	Top Dance/Electronic Song	Won	
Billboard Music Awards	2018	Memories...Do Not Open	Top Dance/Electronic Album	Won	
Billboard Music Awards	2019	Sick Boy	Top Dance/Electronic Album	Won	
Billboard Music Awards	2019	The Chainsmokers	Top Dance/Electronic Artist	Won	
Billboard Music Awards	2020	The Chainsmokers	Top Dance/Electronic Artist	Won	
Billboard Music Awards	2020	World War Joy	Top Dance/Electronic Album	Nominated	
Billboard Music Awards	2021	The Chainsmokers	Top Dance/Electronic Artist	Nominated	
Billboard Music Awards	2024	The Chainsmokers	Top Dance/Electronic Artist	Nominated	
BMI Pop Awards	2020	"Who Do You Love" (featuring 5 Seconds of Summer)	Award Winning Songs	Won	
DJ Awards	2017	The Chainsmokers	Best Big Room House DJ	Nominated	
Electronic Dance Music Awards	2016	"Roses" (The Him remix)	Best Down Tempo, Turned Up	Won	
Electronic Dance Music Awards	2017	"Don't Let Me Down" (featuring Daya)	Best Extended Radio Edit	Won	
Electronic Dance Music Awards	2017	"Closer" (T-Mass remix)	Best Trap Remix	Nominated	
Electronic Dance Music Awards	2017	"Don't Let Me Down" (Zomboy remix)	Best Banger	Nominated	
Electronic Dance Music Awards	2017	"Don't Let Me Down" (Zomboy remix)	Best Rise/Drop	Nominated	
Electronic Dance Music Awards	2017	"Closer" (Kahikko & Jespr remix)	Best Down Tempo, Turned Up	Nominated	
Electronic Dance Music Awards	2017	"Closer" (Danny Dove & Nathan C remix)	Best Remix Collaboration	Nominated	
Electronic Dance Music Awards	2018	"Something Just Like This" (eSQUIRE remix)	Best Banger	Nominated	
Electronic Dance Music Awards	2018	"Something Just Like This" (Don Diablo remix)	Best Rise/Drop	Nominated	
Electronic Dance Music Awards	2023	"Make Me Feel" (with Cheyenne Giles)	Bass House Song of the Year	Nominated	
Electronic Dance Music Awards	2023	The Chainsmokers	Best Group	Nominated	
Electronic Dance Music Awards	2023	#Electro15	Best Radio Show	Nominated	
Electronic Dance Music Awards	2024	"See You Again" (with Illenium and Carlie Hanson)	Best Collaboration	Nominated	
Electronic Dance Music Awards	2024	#Electro15	Best Radio Show	Nominated	
Electronic Dance Music Awards	2024	"Jungle" (with Alok and Mae Stephens)	Main Stage/Festival Song of the Year	Nominated	
Electronic Dance Music Awards	2025	"Don't Lie" (with Kim Petras)	Pop-Dance Anthem of the Year	Nominated	
Electronic Dance Music Awards	2026	The Chainsmokers	Favorite Group	Nominated	
Electronic Dance Music Awards	2026	"Smooth"	Dance/Electro Pop Song of the Year	Nominated	
Electronic Music Awards	2017	Memories...Do Not Open	Album of the Year	Nominated	
Electronic Music Awards	2017	"Closer" (featuring Halsey)	Single of the Year	Nominated	
Electronic Music Awards	2017	The Chainsmokers	Producer of the Year	Nominated	
Gaygalan Awards	2018	"Something Just Like This" (with Coldplay)	International Song of the Year	Nominated	
Global Awards	2018	The Chainsmokers	Best Group	Nominated	
Grammy Awards	2017	The Chainsmokers	Best New Artist	Nominated	
Grammy Awards	2017	"Don't Let Me Down" (featuring Daya)	Best Dance Recording	Won	
Grammy Awards	2017	"Closer" (featuring Halsey)	Best Pop Duo/Group Performance	Nominated	
Grammy Awards	2018	"Something Just Like This" (with Coldplay)	Best Pop Duo/Group Performance	Nominated	
Grammy Awards	2023	Memories...Do Not Open	Best Immersive Audio Album	Nominated	
Hungarian Music Awards	2018	"Something Just Like This" (with Coldplay)	Foreign Electronic Music Album/Recording of the Year	Nominated	
iHeartRadio MMVAs	2016	The Chainsmokers	iHeartRadio International Duo or Group	Nominated	
iHeartRadio MMVAs	2017	The Chainsmokers	iHeartRadio International Duo or Group	Nominated	
iHeartRadio MMVAs	2018	The Chainsmokers	Fan Fave Duo or Group	Nominated	
iHeartRadio Music Awards	2017	"Closer" (featuring Halsey)	Song of the Year	Nominated	
iHeartRadio Music Awards	2017	"Closer" (featuring Halsey)	Dance Song of the Year	Won	
iHeartRadio Music Awards	2017	"Closer" (featuring Halsey)	Best Lyrics	Nominated	
iHeartRadio Music Awards	2017	"Closer" (featuring Halsey)	Best Collaboration	Nominated	
iHeartRadio Music Awards	2017	"Don't Let Me Down" (featuring Daya)	Dance Song of the Year	Nominated	
iHeartRadio Music Awards	2017	"Don't Let Me Down" (featuring Daya)	Best Collaboration	Nominated	
iHeartRadio Music Awards	2017	"Don't Let Me Down" (featuring Daya)	Best Music Video	Nominated	
iHeartRadio Music Awards	2017	Collage	Dance Album of the Year	Won	
iHeartRadio Music Awards	2017	The Chainsmokers	Best New Artist	Won	
iHeartRadio Music Awards	2017	The Chainsmokers	Best Duo/Group of the Year	Nominated	
iHeartRadio Music Awards	2017	The Chainsmokers	Best New Pop Artist	Won	
iHeartRadio Music Awards	2017	The Chainsmokers	Producer of the Year	Nominated	
iHeartRadio Music Awards	2017	The Chainsmokers	Dance Artist of the Year	Won	
iHeartRadio Music Awards	2018	"Something Just Like This" (with Coldplay)	Song of the Year	Nominated	
iHeartRadio Music Awards	2018	"Something Just Like This" (with Coldplay)	Best Collaboration	Won	
iHeartRadio Music Awards	2018	"Something Just Like This" (with Coldplay)	Dance Song of the Year	Nominated	
iHeartRadio Music Awards	2018	The Chainsmokers	Best Duo/Group of the Year	Nominated	
iHeartRadio Music Awards	2018	The Chainsmokers	Dance Artist of the Year	Won	
iHeartRadio Music Awards	2018	Memories...Do Not Open	Dance Album of the Year	Won	
iHeartRadio Music Awards	2019	The Chainsmokers	Dance Artist of the Year	Nominated	
iHeartRadio Music Awards	2019	Sick Boy	Dance Album of the Year	Won	
iHeartRadio Music Awards	2020	The Chainsmokers	Dance Artist of the Year	Nominated	
iHeartRadio Music Awards	2020	World War Joy	Dance Album of the Year	Won	
International Dance Music Awards	2015	"#Selfie"	Best Commercial/Pop Dance Track	Nominated	
International Dance Music Awards	2018	The Chainsmokers	Best Male Artist (Mainstream)	Nominated	
International Dance Music Awards	2018	Memories...Do Not Open	Best Album	Won	
International Dance Music Awards	2018	"Something Just Like This" (with Coldplay)	Best Song	Nominated	
International Dance Music Awards	2018	"Something Just Like This" (Alesso remix)	Best Remix	Won	
International Dance Music Awards	2019	The Chainsmokers	Best Male Artist (Pop/Electronic)	Nominated	
International Dance Music Awards	2020	The Chainsmokers	Dance/Electronic (Male)	Nominated	
Japan Gold Disc Awards	2021	"Closer (Tokyo Remix)" (featuring Mackenyu Arata)	Song of the Year by Download (Western Music)	Won	
Japan Gold Disc Awards	2021	"Closer (Tokyo Remix)" (featuring Mackenyu Arata)	Song of the Year by Streaming (Western Music)	Won	
Joox Thailand Music Awards	2017	The Chainsmokers	International Artist of the Year	Nominated	
Latin American Music Awards	2016	"Don't Let Me Down" (featuring Daya)	Favorite Dance Song	Nominated	
Lo Nuestro Awards	2024	"Celular" (with Nicky Jam and Maluma)	Pop-Urban/Dance – Song of the Year	Nominated	
Los 40 Music Awards	2016	The Chainsmokers	International New Artist of the Year	Nominated	
Los 40 Music Awards	2017	"Something Just Like This" (with Coldplay)	International Song of the Year	Nominated	
Melon Music Awards	2017	"Something Just Like This" (with Coldplay)	Best Pop	Nominated	
MTV Europe Music Awards	2016	The Chainsmokers	Best New Act	Nominated	
MTV Europe Music Awards	2017	The Chainsmokers	Best Electronic	Nominated	
MTV Europe Music Awards	2017	The Chainsmokers	Best World Stage Performance	Won	
MTV Europe Music Awards	2018	The Chainsmokers	Best Electronic	Nominated	
MTV Europe Music Awards	2019	"Call You Mine" (featuring Bebe Rexha)	Best Collaboration	Nominated	
MTV Europe Music Awards	2019	The Chainsmokers	Best Electronic	Nominated	
MTV Europe Music Awards	2020	The Chainsmokers	Best Electronic	Nominated	
MTV Italian Music Awards	2017	The Chainsmokers	Best International Band	Nominated	
MTV Italian Music Awards	2017	"Closer" (featuring Halsey)	Best Video	Won	
MTV MIAW Awards	2017	"Closer" (featuring Halsey)	Collaboration of the Year	Nominated	
MTV MIAW Awards	2017	The Chainsmokers	Beat Guru	Nominated	
MTV Video Music Awards	2016	"Don't Let Me Down" (featuring Daya)	Best Electronic Video	Nominated	
MTV Video Music Awards	2016	"Closer" (featuring Halsey)	Song of Summer	Nominated	
MTV Video Music Awards	2017	"Closer" (featuring Halsey)	Best Collaboration	Nominated	
MTV Video Music Awards	2017	"Closer" (featuring Halsey)	Best Editing	Nominated	
MTV Video Music Awards	2018	"Everybody Hates Me"	Best Dance	Nominated	
MTV Video Music Awards	2019	"Call You Mine" (featuring Bebe Rexha)	Best Dance	Won	
MTV Video Music Awards	2019	"Call You Mine" (featuring Bebe Rexha)	Song of Summer	Nominated	
MTV Video Music Awards Japan	2017	"Closer" (featuring Halsey)	Best Group Video – International	Won	
MTV Woodies	2017	The Chainsmokers	Woodie of the Year	Won	
Myx Music Awards	2017	"Closer" (featuring Halsey)	Favorite International Video	Won	
New Music Awards	2017	The Chainsmokers	Top 40 Group/Duo of the Year	Won	
New Music Awards	2017	The Chainsmokers	Top 40 New Group of the Year	Nominated	
New Music Awards	2017	The Chainsmokers	AC Group/Duo of the Year	Nominated	
New Music Awards	2020	The Chainsmokers with Bebe Rexha	AC/Hot Group of the Year	Nominated	
Nickelodeon Kids' Choice Awards	2017	The Chainsmokers	Favorite Music Group	Nominated	
Nickelodeon Kids' Choice Awards	2017	The Chainsmokers	Favorite New Artist	Nominated	
Nickelodeon Kids' Choice Awards	2018	The Chainsmokers	Favorite Music Group	Nominated	
Nickelodeon Kids' Choice Awards	2019	The Chainsmokers	Favorite Music Group	Nominated	
Nickelodeon Kids' Choice Awards	2020	The Chainsmokers	Favorite Music Group	Nominated	
NME Awards	2017	The Chainsmokers	Worst Band	Nominated	
NRJ DJ Awards	2016	The Chainsmokers	Best New DJ	Won	
NRJ DJ Awards	2016	"Roses" (featuring Rozes)	Best Single Dance/Electro	Nominated	
NRJ DJ Awards	2017	"Something Just Like This" (with Coldplay)	Best Collaboration of the Year	Won	
NRJ Music Awards	2016	The Chainsmokers	International Breakthrough Act	Nominated	
NRJ Music Awards	2017	The Chainsmokers	International Duo/Group of the Year	Nominated	
NRJ Music Awards	2017	"Something Just Like This" (with Coldplay)	Music Video of the Year	Nominated	
NRJ Music Awards	2017	"Something Just Like This" (with Coldplay)	International Song of the Year	Nominated	
People's Choice Awards	2017	The Chainsmokers	Favorite Group	Nominated	
People's Choice Awards	2017	The Chainsmokers	Favorite Breakout Artist	Nominated	
Pollstar Awards	2017	The Chainsmokers	Best New Touring Artist	Nominated	
Premios Juventud	2024	"Celular" (with Nicky Jam and Maluma)	OMG Collaboration	Nominated	
Premios Juventud	2024	"Celular" (with Nicky Jam and Maluma)	Favorite Dance Track	Nominated	
Radio Disney Music Awards	2017	The Chainsmokers	Best Group	Nominated	
Radio Disney Music Awards	2017	"Closer" (featuring Halsey)	Song of the Year	Nominated	
Radio Disney Music Awards	2017	"Closer" (featuring Halsey)	Best Song to Lip Sync to	Nominated	
Radio Disney Music Awards	2017	"Don't Let Me Down" (featuring Daya)	Best Song to Dance to	Nominated	
RTHK International Pop Poll Awards	2017	The Chainsmokers	Top Group/Band	Silver	
RTHK International Pop Poll Awards	2017	"Closer" (featuring Halsey)	Top Ten International Gold Songs	Won	
RTHK International Pop Poll Awards	2018	"Something Just Like This" (with Coldplay)	Top Ten International Gold Songs	Won	
RTHK International Pop Poll Awards	2018	The Chainsmokers	Top Group/Band	Bronze	
Streamy Awards	2014	"#Selfie"	Music Video	Nominated	
Swiss Music Awards	2018	The Chainsmokers	Best International Breaking Act	Nominated	
Swiss Music Awards	2018	"Something Just Like This" (with Coldplay)	Best International Hit	Nominated	
Teen Choice Awards	2014	"#Selfie"	Choice EDM Song	Nominated	
Teen Choice Awards	2016	The Chainsmokers	Choice Music Group	Nominated	
Teen Choice Awards	2016	The Chainsmokers	Choice Summer Music Star: Group	Nominated	
Teen Choice Awards	2017	The Chainsmokers	Choice Music Group	Nominated	
Teen Choice Awards	2017	"Closer" (featuring Halsey)	Choice Group Song	Nominated	
Teen Choice Awards	2017	"Closer" (featuring Halsey)	Choice Pop Song	Nominated	
Teen Choice Awards	2017	"Something Just Like This" (with Coldplay)	Choice EDM Song	Nominated	
Teen Choice Awards	2017	The Chainsmokers	Choice Summer Group	Nominated	
Teen Choice Awards	2018	The Chainsmokers	Choice Electronic/Dance Artist	Won	
Teen Choice Awards	2018	The Chainsmokers	Choice Summer Group	Nominated	
Teen Choice Awards	2019	The Chainsmokers	Choice Music Group	Nominated	
Teen Choice Awards	2019	"Call You Mine" (featuring Bebe Rexha)	Choice Electronic/Dance Song	Nominated	
Teen Choice Awards	2019	"Who Do You Love" (featuring 5 Seconds of Summer)	Choice Electronic/Dance Song	Nominated	
Teen Choice Awards	2019	The Chainsmokers	Choice Summer Group	Nominated	
Telehit Awards	2016	The Chainsmokers	DJ of the Year	Nominated	
Telehit Awards	2017	The Chainsmokers	DJ of the Year	Nominated	
UK Music Video Awards	2017	"Paris VR"	Best Interactive Video	Nominated	
UK Music Video Awards	2025	"Helium"	Best Pop / R&B / Soul / Jazz Video – Newcomer	Nominated	
Urban Music Awards	2016	The Chainsmokers	Best Producer	Nominated	
WDM Radio Awards	2017	The Chainsmokers	Best DJ	Nominated	
WDM Radio Awards	2017	"Closer" (featuring Halsey)	Best Global Track	Nominated	
WDM Radio Awards	2017	"Don't Let Me Down" (featuring Daya)	Best Trending Track	Won	
WDM Radio Awards	2018	The Chainsmokers	Best DJ	Nominated	
WDM Radio Awards	2018	The Chainsmokers	Best Party DJ	Nominated	
WDM Radio Awards	2018	"Something Just Like This" (with Coldplay)	Best Global Track	Nominated	
WDM Radio Awards	2018	"Something Just Like This" (Don Diablo remix)	Best Remix	Won	
