= SSSniperWolf =

American YouTuber (born 1992)

- SSSniperWolf in 2022
- Born: Alia Shelesh; October 22, 1992 (age 34); Liverpool, Merseyside, England
- Other names: sexysexysniper (formerly); Little Lia (second channel); Lia Roblox (third channel)
- Occupation: YouTuber

YouTube information
- Channel: SSSniperWolf
- Years active: 2011–present
- Genres: Reaction videos; gaming (formerly)
- Subscribers: 35 million
- Views: 26.6 billion
- Last updated: May 26, 2026

Alia Marie "Lia" Shelesh (born October 22, 1992), also known as her pseudonym SSSniperWolf, is a British-born American YouTuber. She started uploading YouTube videos in 2011, as "sexysexysniper", and started the "SSSniperWolf" YouTube channel in 2013. Initially uploading Call of Duty Let's Play videos, she shifted to reaction videos in 2017; in that year, her channel had over 5 million subscribers. According to British Vogue in 2020, she is one of the most recognizable social media personalities associated with online video games.

In 2023, after receiving criticism for "freebooting" TikTok videos in her reaction content, she was involved in an internet scandal when she doxxed a critic, YouTuber jacksfilms, by livestreaming the front of his home, resulting in temporary demonetization.

== Life and career ==
Shelesh was born on October 22, 1992, in Liverpool. Her family moved to the United States when she was six, at which age she started playing video games.

Shelesh started uploading videos to her YouTube channel "sexysexysniper", consisting of Let's Plays of games such as Call of Duty. This channel was active in 2011 and 2012. She moved to the SSSniperWolf channel in 2013, on which her first video was a compilation of fails in Call of Duty: Black Ops II. She derived her handle from Sniper Wolf, a character from the Metal Gear video game series.

=== Shift to reaction videos ===
In 2016, Shelesh featured on Day of Doom, an event hosted by id Software. In 2017, she hosted the show Clickbait in which social media influencers competed in unusual challenges. The show aired on the subscription service Fullscreen. She also made an appearance on FANtasies, an anthology series.

In early 2017, the genre of Shelesh's content changed from entirely gaming-oriented to primarily reaction videos. That year, her channel grew to over five million subscribers, and she was among the ten entrants in Forbes' "Top Influencers" list in the "Gaming" category for 2017. In 2018, she appeared on an episode of Fear Factor and on an episode of Ultimate Expedition. In 2019, she was nominated in the 2019 Teen Choice Awards in the category "Choice Gamer" and won the "Favorite Esports Star" award in the 2019 Kids' Choice Sports. In 2019 and 2020, she won the Nickelodeon Kids' Choice Awards in the category "favorite gamer".

From 2020 to present she has collaborated with Dhar Mann Studios on more than 14 web videos playing herself or playing various characters.

In 2021, YouTube ranked Shelesh third on its "US Top Creators" list. In the same year, she won the Gaming Influencer of the Year Award at the American Influencer Awards.

In 2021, Chinese video game publisher HoYoverse, paid Shelesh $100,000 for reaction videos promoting the gacha video game Genshin Impact; the videos, according to the US Federal Trade Commission (FTC), "depict a fake loot box prize win, in a way that would have been impossible in the Genshin Impact game". The FTC alleged that these videos were one of the instances of HoYoverse's deceptive microtransaction practices targeting children, and the company settled the FTC case against it by paying a $20 million settlement fine to the US Department of the Treasury in 2025.

=== Legal dispute with Evan Young ===
On August 1, 2023, it was reported that Shelesh was one of the highest-paid YouTubers with a net worth of US$16 million. On August 17, 2023, Evan Young filed a lawsuit against Shelesh for breach of contract and financial misdoings in relation to content produced by Channel Red, their joint company. He accused her of not paying him for work he did for Channel Red. Young also claimed he curated and scripted her content for years. Shelesh filed a motion to dismiss on October 5, 2023, claiming the accusations were "vindictive". In the dismissal, attorneys claimed that not long after filing for divorce, Young was locked out by Shelesh of several YouTube channels they managed together, including the main SSSniperWolf channel and SexySexySniper, as well as building new channels using the brand built by Young and Shelesh with third party entities. As of October 15, 2024, a Motion of Continuation has been filed and the case has been updated, and is currently awaiting a settlement agreement.

=== Conflict with Jacksfilms ===
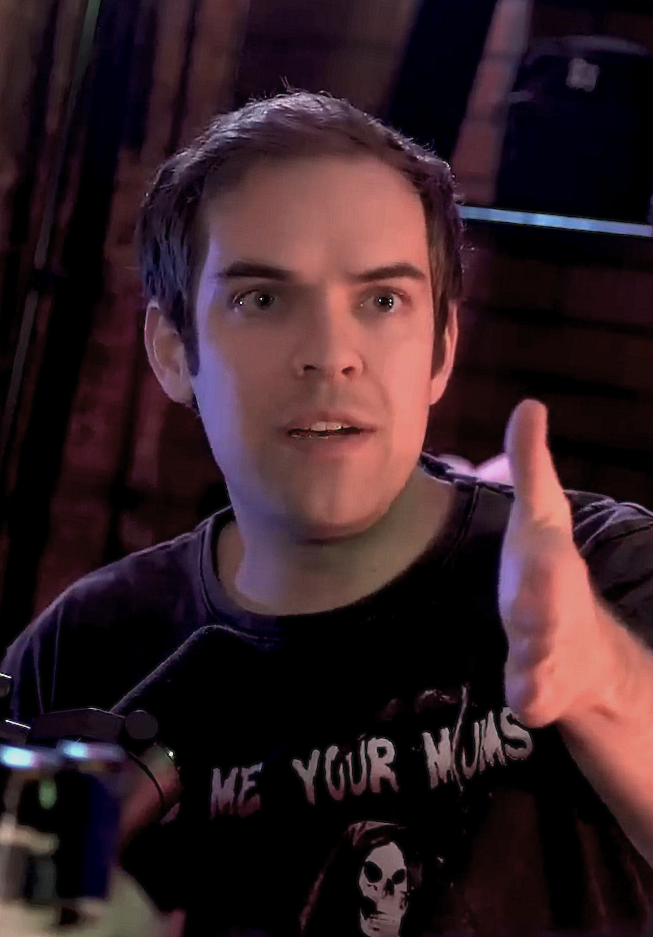
Jack Douglass in 2019

YouTuber Jack Douglass, known as jacksfilms, accused Shelesh of profiting from other creators' work through monetizing her reaction videos, while frequently not providing proper credit, and characterized her content as rudimentary and not transformative enough for fair use. In 2022, he began using the "JJJacksfilms" account to parody Shelesh's videos. In response, she made several social media posts accusing him of sexism and plagiarism.

On October 13, 2023, Shelesh, while filming near Douglass's house, asked her followers if she should pay him a visit, stating that he lives near Shelesh's studio. She showed his house in an Instagram story captioned "let's talk like adults", which was quickly removed, but her followers shared screenshots. Douglass responded by accusing Shelesh of doxing him, called her actions "creepy, gross, violating", and asked YouTube to demonetize her. Douglass's wife expressed safety concerns, and the pair contemplated moving. Shelesh said that she had found the Douglasses' address on Google, that she "had no idea how to dox", that Douglass was "creating drama to pay (the pair's) bills", and that he was a "creep". Shelesh discussed seeking a restraining order against Douglass, whom she called "obsessed" over the matter.

On October 18, YouTube's Twitter account posted "would it be too meta to do a reaction video to a reaction video", which multiple users interpreted as an offhand comment on the situation, causing a backlash. By October 19, a Change.org petition to remove SSSniperWolf from YouTube gathered 13,000 signatures. The next day, YouTube temporarily demonetized her channel, while expressing disapproval of "the behavior on both sides." Multiple YouTubers saw the latter as unfair. Shelesh subsequently apologized to Douglass in a tweet, saying that her actions were "inexcusable" and that she respects YouTube's decision. She continued to upload videos on her "SSSniperWolf Top Videos" channel, but it was later also demonetized.

== Personal life ==
In 2019, Shelesh and Evan Young, her partner at the time, bought a house in MacDonald Highlands in Henderson, Nevada, for $2.9 million, through an entity named Red Channel Living Trust, which they sold for $4 million in 2022, after which they bought 2.25 acres of vacant land on Mummy Mountain, Arizona for a little under $7 million. In May 2022, Shelesh purchased a home in Paradise Valley, Arizona for a little under $10 million. In September 2023, Shelesh and Young were reported to be legally married, though they had separated in September 2022 and filed for divorce in late 2022.

In August 2022, Shelesh's youngest brother, Bakir Shelesh, died from drowning after losing his board while surfing in Wainiha Bay on Kauai, Hawaii. He was pronounced dead on August 6.

== Reception ==
In a review of her main channel, Kennedy Unthank from Plugged In commended Shelesh for seeking to "make people laugh through daily uploads" and the quantity of available videos. However, Unthank voiced concern that she "may be profiting from someone else's work" with her reaction videos through YouTube's monetization system. According to Unthank, while some of her reactions provide additional insight or have a transformative nature, many of her videos did not offer anything substantial over the original clip that was being reacted to.

Linguist John McWhorter of the New York Times commented on Shelesh's use of Black English words and idioms, using her language as an example of "effortless infusion of Black English expressions".

== Filmography ==
Year	Title	Role	Notes
2017	Clickbait	Herself	Webseries, also host
2017	FANtasies	Herself	guest, webseries
2018	Ultimate Expedition	Herself	Webseries
2018	Fear Factor	Herself	Contestant
2023	Sister Secrets	Julia	Main role, webseries
2026	The Gallerist	Green (voice)	uncredited
