= 2019 Teen Choice Awards =

American awards ceremony held in California

- Date: August 11, 2019
- Location: Hermosa Beach, California
- Hosted by: Lucy Hale; David Dobrik
- Most awards: Movies: Avengers: Endgame (4); Television: Riverdale (4); Music: BTS (4); Digital & Misc.: The Dolan Twins (2)
- Most nominations: Movies: Avengers: Endgame (9); Television: Riverdale (7); Music: Taylor Swift (7); Digital & Misc.: The Dolan Twins & Noah Centineo (3)

Television/radio coverage
- Network: Fox

The 2019 Teen Choice Awards ceremony was held on August 11, 2019, and used a temporary outdoor on-beach stage in Hermosa Beach, California near the beach pier. This was the only time the ceremony was held outdoors. The awards celebrated the year's achievements in music, film, television, sports, fashion, comedy, and the internet, and were voted on by viewers aged 13 and over living in the United States on their website and through various social media sites.

Leading the way with the most nominations was Avengers: Endgame with nine. Taylor Swift was the recipient of the inaugural "Icon" award.

As of 2026, this is the most recently held Teen Choice Awards ceremony.

== Performers ==
Performers	Song	Ref.
OneRepublic	"Counting Stars" "Rescue Me"	
Zhavia	"Deep Down"	
Monsta X	"Who Do U Love?"	
Johnny Orlando; Jacob Sartorius; Hayden Summerall	"California Gurls"	
CNCO	"Pretend"	
Jordan McGraw and Sarah Hyland	"Met At a Party"	
Blanco Brown	"The Git Up"	
Mabel	"Don't Call Me Up"	

- Bazzi and HRVY were initially announced as performers at the ceremony, but they were pulled out at the last minute.

== Presenters ==
Presenters included:

- Maia Mitchell and KJ Apa – presented Choice Action Movie Actor
- Sky Brown – introduced OneRepublic
- Jessica Alba – presented Choice Summer Movie Actress
- Lauren Jauregui and Gregg Sulkin – presented Choice Comedy Movie
- Ken Jeong – presented Choice Comedy Movie Actor
- Charlie Puth – presented Choice Male Artist
- Madison Beer – introduced Monsta X
- Maddie Ziegler and Candace Cameron Bure – introduced Johnny Orlando, Jacob Sartorius, and Hayden Summerall
- Tori Spelling and Jennie Garth – introduced Alex Morgan
- Alex Morgan – presented Icon Award
- Laura Marano and Chloe x Halle – presented Choice Song: Male Artist
- Brittany Snow, Emily Osment, and Megalyn Echikunwoke – introduced Jordan McGraw and Sarah Hyland
- Gabrielle Union – presented Choice Drama TV Show
- The Bella Twins – introduced Blanco Brown
- John Stamos – introduced Mabel
- Sam and Colby – presented Choice Music Web Star
- Jack Black – presented Decade Award

== Winners and nominees ==
The first wave of nominations were announced on June 19, 2019. The second wave was announced on July 8, 2019. Winners are listed first, in bold.

=== Movies ===
Choice Action Movie	Choice Action Movie Actor
**Avengers: Endgame**; Ant-Man and the Wasp; Bumblebee; Captain Marvel; Men in Black: International; Spider-Man: Into the Spider-Verse	**Robert Downey Jr.** **– Avengers: Endgame as Tony Stark / Iron Man**; John Cena – Bumblebee as Jack Burns; Chris Evans – Avengers: Endgame as Steve Rogers / Captain America; Chris Hemsworth – Avengers: Endgame/Men in Black: International as Thor; Henry/Agent H; Samuel L. Jackson – Captain Marvel as Nick Fury; Paul Rudd – Ant-Man and the Wasp/Avengers: Endgame as Scott Lang / Ant-Man
Choice Action Movie Actress	Choice Sci-Fi/Fantasy Movie
**Scarlett Johansson – Avengers: Endgame as Natasha Romanoff / Black Widow**; Brie Larson – Captain Marvel/Avengers: Endgame as Carol Danvers / Captain Marvel; Evangeline Lilly – Ant-Man and the Wasp as Hope van Dyne / Wasp; Hailee Steinfeld – Bumblebee as Charlie Watson; Zoe Saldaña – Avengers: Endgame as Gamora; Tessa Thompson – Men in Black: International as Molly Wright/Agent M	**Aladdin**; Aquaman; Dark Phoenix; Fantastic Beasts: The Crimes of Grindelwald; Mary Poppins Returns; Shazam!
Choice Sci-Fi/Fantasy Movie Actor	Choice Sci-Fi/Fantasy Movie Actress
**Will Smith – Aladdin as Genie**; Zachary Levi – Shazam! as Billy Batson / Shazam; Mena Massoud – Aladdin as Aladdin; James McAvoy – Dark Phoenix as Charles Xavier / Professor X; Lin-Manuel Miranda – Mary Poppins Returns as Jack; Jason Momoa – Aquaman as Arthur Curry / Aquaman	**Naomi Scott – Aladdin as Princess Jasmine**; Emily Blunt – Mary Poppins Returns as Mary Poppins; Amber Heard – Aquaman as Mera; Keira Knightley – The Nutcracker and the Four Realms as Sugar Plum Fairy; Sophie Turner – Dark Phoenix as Jean Grey / Dark Phoenix; Katherine Waterston – Fantastic Beasts: The Crimes of Grindelwald as Porpentina "Tina" Goldstein
Choice Drama Movie	Choice Drama Movie Actor
**After**; Bohemian Rhapsody; Breakthrough; Five Feet Apart; The Hate U Give; To All the Boys I've Loved Before	**Hero Fiennes-Tiffin** **– After as Hardin Scott**; Noah Centineo – To All the Boys I've Loved Before as Peter Kavinsky; Bradley Cooper – A Star Is Born as Jackson Maine; Taron Egerton – Rocketman as Elton John; Rami Malek – Bohemian Rhapsody as Freddie Mercury; Cole Sprouse – Five Feet Apart as Will Newman
Choice Drama Movie Actress	Choice Comedy Movie
**Josephine Langford** **– After as Tessa Young**; Lana Condor – To All the Boys I've Loved Before as Lara Jean Covey; Lady Gaga – A Star Is Born as Ally Maine; Chrissy Metz – Breakthrough as Joyce Smith; Haley Lu Richardson – Five Feet Apart as Stella Grant; Amandla Stenberg – The Hate U Give as Starr Carter	**Crazy Rich Asians**; Instant Family; Isn't It Romantic; Little; Pokémon Detective Pikachu; The Perfect Date
Choice Comedy Movie Actor	Choice Comedy Movie Actress
**Noah Centineo – The Perfect Date as Brooks Rattigan**; Henry Golding – Crazy Rich Asians as Nick Young; Kevin Hart – Night School as Teddy Walker; Liam Hemsworth – Isn't It Romantic as Blake; Ryan Reynolds – Pokémon Detective Pikachu as Detective Pikachu; Mark Wahlberg – Instant Family as Pete Wagner	**Laura Marano – The Perfect Date as Celia Lieberman**; Awkwafina – Crazy Rich Asians as Goh Peik Lin; Tiffany Haddish – Night School as Carrie; Marsai Martin – Little as Young Jordan Sanders; Rebel Wilson – Isn't It Romantic as Natalie; Constance Wu – Crazy Rich Asians as Rachel Chu
Choice Movie Villain	Choice Summer Movie
**Josh Brolin – Avengers: Endgame as Thanos**; Johnny Depp – Fantastic Beasts: The Crimes of Grindelwald as Gellert Grindelwald; Marwan Kenzari – Aladdin as Jafar; Jude Law – Captain Marvel as Yon-Rogg; Mark Strong – Shazam! as Dr. Thaddeus Sivana; Patrick Wilson – Aquaman as Orm Marius / Ocean Master	**Spider-Man: Far From Home**; Late Night; Murder Mystery; The Last Summer; Toy Story 4; Yesterday
Choice Summer Movie Actor	Choice Summer Movie Actress
**Tom Holland – Spider-Man: Far From Home as Peter Parker / Spider-Man**; KJ Apa – The Last Summer as Griffin Hourigan; Corey Fogelmanis – Ma as Andy Hawkins; Charles Melton – The Sun Is Also a Star as Daniel Bae; Himesh Patel – Yesterday as Jack Malik; Adam Sandler – Murder Mystery as Nick Spitz	**Zendaya – Spider-Man: Far From Home as Michelle/"MJ"**; Jennifer Aniston – Murder Mystery as Audrey Spitz; Selena Gomez – The Dead Don't Die as Zoe; Mindy Kaling – Late Night as Molly Patel; Maia Mitchell – The Last Summer as Phoebe Fisher; Yara Shahidi – The Sun Is Also a Star as Natasha Kingsley

=== Television ===
Choice Drama TV Show	Choice Drama TV Actor
**Riverdale**; Good Trouble; Pretty Little Liars: The Perfectionists; The Resident; Runaways; Star	**Cole Sprouse – Riverdale as Jughead Jones**; KJ Apa – Riverdale as Archie Andrews; Sterling K. Brown – This Is Us as Randall Pearson; Justin Hartley – This Is Us as Kevin Pearson; Adam Huber – Dynasty as Liam Ridley; Oliver Stark – 9-1-1 as Evan "Buck" Buckley
Choice Drama TV Actress	Choice Sci-Fi/Fantasy TV Show
**Lili Reinhart – Riverdale as Betty Cooper**; Sofia Carson – Pretty Little Liars: The Perfectionists as Ava Jalali; Ryan Destiny – Star as Alexandra Crane; Maia Mitchell – Good Trouble as Callie Adams-Foster; Camila Mendes – Riverdale as Veronica Lodge; Cierra Ramirez – Good Trouble as Marina Adams-Foster	**Shadowhunters**; The 100; Charmed; Chilling Adventures of Sabrina; Legacies; Supernatural
Choice Sci-Fi/Fantasy TV Actor	Choice Sci-Fi/Fantasy TV Actress
**Jared Padalecki – Supernatural as Sam Winchester**; Aubrey Joseph – Cloak & Dagger as Tyrone Johnson / Cloak; Ross Lynch – Chilling Adventures of Sabrina as Harvey Kinkle; Bob Morley – The 100 as Bellamy Blake; Dominic Sherwood – Shadowhunters as Jace Herondale; Harry Shum Jr. – Shadowhunters as Magnus Bane	**Katherine McNamara – Shadowhunters as Clarissa "Clary Fray" Fairchild**; Melonie Diaz – Charmed as Melanie "Mel" Vera; Olivia Holt – Cloak & Dagger as Tandy Bowen / Dagger; Elliot Page – The Umbrella Academy as Vanya Hargreeves / Number Seven / The White Violin; Danielle Rose Russell – Legacies as Hope Mikaelson; Kiernan Shipka – Chilling Adventures of Sabrina as Sabrina Spellman
Choice Action TV Show	Choice Action TV Actor
**MacGyver**; Arrow; The Flash; Gotham; Legends of Tomorrow; Supergirl	**Stephen Amell – Arrow as Oliver Queen / Green Arrow**; Grant Gustin – The Flash as Barry Allen / The Flash; Ben McKenzie – Gotham as James Gordon; Brandon Routh – Legends of Tomorrow as Ray Palmer / Atom; Brenton Thwaites – Titans as Dick Grayson; Lucas Till – MacGyver as Angus MacGyver
Choice Action TV Actress	Choice Comedy TV Show
**Gabrielle Union – L.A.'s Finest as Sydney "Syd" Burnett**; Jessica Alba – L.A.'s Finest as Nancy McKenna; Melissa Benoist – Supergirl as Kara Danvers / Supergirl; Danielle Panabaker – The Flash as Caitlin Snow / Killer Frost; Candice Patton – The Flash as Iris West; Emily Bett Rickards – Arrow as Felicity Smoak	**The Big Bang Theory**; Black-ish; Brooklyn Nine-Nine; Fuller House; Jane the Virgin; One Day at a Time
Choice Comedy TV Actor	Choice Comedy TV Actress
**Jaime Camil – Jane the Virgin as Rogelio de la Vega**; Anthony Anderson – Black-ish as Andre "Dre" Johnson Sr.; Jim Parsons – The Big Bang Theory as Sheldon Cooper; Daniel Radcliffe – Miracle Workers as Craig Bog; Marcel Ruiz – One Day at a Time as Alejandro "Alex" Alberto Alvarez Riera Calderon Leyte-Vidal Inclán; Andy Samberg – Brooklyn Nine-Nine as Detective Jake Peralta	**Nina Dobrev – Fam as Clem**; Candace Cameron Bure – Fuller House as D.J. Tanner-Fuller; Kaley Cuoco – The Big Bang Theory as Penny; Sarah Hyland – Modern Family as Haley Dunphy; Gina Rodriguez – Jane the Virgin as Jane Villanueva; Yara Shahidi – Black-ish as Zoey Johnson
Choice Reality TV Show	Choice Throwback TV Show
**America's Got Talent**; Keeping Up with the Kardashians; Lip Sync Battle; The Masked Singer; Queer Eye; The Voice	**Friends**; All That; Beverly Hills, 90210; The Fresh Prince of Bel-Air; Moesha; The Office
Choice TV Villain	Choice Summer TV Show
**Cameron Monaghan – Gotham as Jerome and Jeremiah Valeska**; Luke Baines – Shadowhunters as Jonathan Morgenstern; Sarah Carter – The Flash as Grace Gibbons / Cicada II; Jon Cryer – Supergirl as Lex Luthor; Adam Scott – The Good Place as Trevor; Sea Shimooka – Arrow as Emiko Queen / Green Arrow	**Stranger Things**; Cobra Kai; Nailed It!; So You Think You Can Dance; The Bold Type; Younger
Choice Summer TV Actor	Choice Summer TV Actress
**Noah Schnapp – Stranger Things as Will Byers**; Gaten Matarazzo – Stranger Things as Dustin Henderson; Caleb McLaughlin – Stranger Things as Lucas Sinclair; Luka Sabbat – Grown-ish as Luca Hall; Diego Tinoco – On My Block as Cesar Diaz; Finn Wolfhard – Stranger Things as Mike Wheeler	**Millie Bobby Brown – Stranger Things as Eleven / Jane Hopper**; Chloe Bennet – Agents of S.H.I.E.L.D. as Daisy "Skye" Johnson / Quake; Hilary Duff – Younger as Kelsey Peters; Jessica Marie Garcia – On My Block as Jasmine Flores; Rose McIver – iZombie as Olivia "Liv" Moore; Yara Shahidi – Grown-ish as Zoey Johnson

=== Music ===
Icon Award	Decade Award
**Taylor Swift**	**Jonas Brothers**
Choice Male Artist	Choice Female Artist
**Shawn Mendes**; Khalid; Lil Nas X; Marshmello; Post Malone; Ed Sheeran	**Billie Eilish**; Lauren Jauregui; Ariana Grande; Halsey; Taylor Swift; Cardi B
Choice Music Group	Choice Country Artist
**Why Don't We**; 5 Seconds of Summer; The Chainsmokers; Jonas Brothers; Panic! at the Disco; PrettyMuch	**Dan + Shay**; Kelsea Ballerini; Kane Brown; Kacey Musgraves; Thomas Rhett; Brett Young
Choice Latin Artist	Choice R&B/Hip-Hop Artist
**CNCO**; Bad Bunny; J Balvin; Becky G; Daddy Yankee; Maluma	**Cardi B**; Normani; Drake; Nicki Minaj; Post Malone; Travis Scott
Choice Rock Artist	Choice Song: Female Artist
**Panic! at the Disco**; AJR; Cage the Elephant; Imagine Dragons; Lovelytheband; Twenty One Pilots	**"Expectations" – Lauren Jauregui**; "7 Rings" – Ariana Grande; "Bad Guy" – Billie Eilish; "Me!" — Taylor Swift feat. Brendon Urie; "Never Really Over" – Katy Perry; "Nightmare" – Halsey
Choice Song: Male Artist	Choice Song: Group
**"Two of Us" — Louis Tomlinson**; "Better" – Khalid; "If I Can't Have You" – Shawn Mendes; "Old Town Road" – Lil Nas X; "Sicko Mode" – Travis Scott; "Wow" – Post Malone	**"Ddu-Du Ddu-Du" – Blackpink**; "8 Letters" – Why Don't We"; "Bad Liar" – Imagine Dragons; "Easier" – 5 Seconds of Summer; "Hey Look Ma, I Made It" – Panic! at the Disco; "Sucker" – Jonas Brothers
Choice Collaboration	Choice Pop Song
**"Boy with Luv" – BTS feat. Halsey**; "Dancing with a Stranger" – Sam Smith & Normani; "I Don't Care" – Ed Sheeran & Justin Bieber; "Old Town Road (Remix)" – Lil Nas X feat. Billy Ray Cyrus; "Shallow" – Lady Gaga & Bradley Cooper; "What a Time" – Julia Michaels feat. Niall Horan	**"Thank U, Next" – Ariana Grande"**; "Dancing with a Stranger" – Sam Smith & Normani; "I Don't Care" – Ed Sheeran & Justin Bieber; "Never Really Over!" – Katy Perry; "Sucker" – Jonas Brothers; "Sweet but Psycho" – Ava Max
Choice Country Song	Choice Electronic/Dance Song
**"Speechless" – Dan + Shay**; "Girl" – Maren Morris; "Good as You" – Kane Brown; "Look What God Gave Her" – Thomas Rhett; "Miss Me More" – Kelsea Ballerini; "Rainbow" – Kacey Musgraves	**"Close To Me (Red Velvet Remix)" – Ellie Goulding, Diplo, Red Velvet**; "365" – Zedd & Katy Perry; "Call You Mine" – The Chainsmokers feat. Bebe Rexha; "Find U Again" – Mark Ronson feat. Camila Cabello; "Happier" – Marshmello and Bastille; "Who Do You Love" – The Chainsmokers feat. 5 Seconds of Summer
Choice Latin Song	Choice R&B/Hip-Hop Song
**"Pretend" – CNCO**; "Baila Baila Baila (Remix)" – Ozuna feat. Daddy Yankee, Farruko, J Balvin & Anuel AA; "Con altura" – Rosalía, J Balvin & El Guincho; "Con Calma (Remix)" – Daddy Yankee & Katy Perry feat. Snow; "Mia" – Bad Bunny feat. Drake; "Te Robaré" – Nicky Jam & Ozuna	**"Old Town Road (Remix)" – Lil Nas X feat. Billy Ray Cyrus**; "Going Bad" – Meek Mill feat. Drake; "Pure Water" – Mustard & Migos; "Sunflower" – Post Malone & Swae Lee; "Talk" – Khalid; "Wow" – Post Malone
Choice Rock/Alternative Song	Choice Breakout Artist
**"Hey Look Ma, I Made It" – Panic! at the Disco**; "100 Bad Days" – AJR; "Joy" – Bastille; "Natural" – Imagine Dragons; "Ready to Let Go" – Cage the Elephant; "These Are My Friends" – Lovelytheband	**Billie Eilish**; HRVY; Juice Wrld; Lil Nas X; Lizzo; Rosalía
Choice International Artist	Choice Summer Song
**BTS**; Blackpink; CNCO; EXO; Little Mix; NCT 127	**"Señorita" – Shawn Mendes & Camila Cabello**; "Cool" – Jonas Brothers; "Easier" – 5 Seconds of Summer; "Summer Days" – Martin Garrix feat. Macklemore & Patrick Stump; "Truth Hurts" – Lizzo; "You Need to Calm Down" – Taylor Swift
Choice Summer Male Artist	Choice Summer Female Artist
**Shawn Mendes**; Daddy Yankee; Lil Nas X; Drake; DJ Khaled; Khalid	**Halsey**; Ava Max; Julia Michaels; Katy Perry; Lizzo; Taylor Swift
Choice Summer Group	Choice Summer Tour
**Jonas Brothers**; 5 Seconds of Summer; Little Mix; Panic! at the Disco; The Chainsmokers; Why Don't We	**BTS – BTS World Tour Love Yourself: Speak Yourself**; Ariana Grande – Sweetener World Tour; Billie Eilish – When We All Fall Asleep Tour; Blackpink – Blackpink 2019 World Tour (In Your Area); Jennifer Lopez – It's My Party; Shawn Mendes – Shawn Mendes: The Tour
Choice Song From A Movie	
**"A Whole New World" (End Title) – Aladdin – Zayn & Zhavia Ward**; "Broken & Beautiful" – UglyDolls – Kelly Clarkson; "Carry On" – Pokémon Detective Pikachu – Kygo & Rita Ora; "Don't Give Up On Me" – Five Feet Apart – Andy Grammer; "Shallow" – A Star Is Born – Bradley Cooper & Lady Gaga; "Sunflower" – Spider-Man: Into the Spider-Verse – Post Malone & Swae Lee

=== Digital ===
Choice Female Web Star	Choice Male Web Star
**Emma Chamberlain**; Madison Beer; Eva Gutowski; Liza Koshy; Lilly Singh; Maddie Ziegler	**David Dobrik**; The Dolan Twins; Ryan Higa; Guava Juice; MrBeast; Brent Rivera
Choice Comedy Web Star	Choice Social Star
**The Dolan Twins**; Colleen Ballinger; CalebCity; Gabbie Hanna; Liza Koshy; Lele Pons	**Noah Centineo**; Kylie Jenner; Dwayne "The Rock" Johnson; Will Smith; Taylor Swift; Chrissy Teigen
Choice Music Web Star	Choice Fashion/Beauty Web Star
**Annie LeBlanc**; Asher Angel; Chloe x Halle; Loren Gray; Johnny Orlando; Hayden Summerall	**Hannah Meloche**; James Charles; Summer McKeen; Bethany Mota; Nikkie de Jager; Mackenzie Ziegler
Choice Gamer	Choice YouTuber
**PewDiePie**; DanTDM; Jacksepticeye; Ninja; Ryan Ohmwrecker; SSSniperWolf	**Sam and Colby**; Erika Costell; David Dobrik; Kian and JC; Merrell Twins; Niki and Gabi
Choice Fandom	
**BTS – ARMY**; Ariana Grande – Arianators; Blackpink – Blinks; CNCO – CNCOwners; Selena Gomez – Selenators; Taylor Swift – Swifties

=== Miscellaneous ===
Choice Male Athlete	Choice Female Athlete
**Stephen Curry**; James Harden; Patrick Mahomes; Lionel Messi; AJ Styles; Tiger Woods	**Serena Williams**; Simone Biles; Sky Brown; Tobin Heath; The Bella Twins; Katelyn Ohashi
Choice Ship	Choice Comedian
**Lili Reinhart & Cole Sprouse – Riverdale**; Lana Condor & Noah Centineo – To All The Boys I've Loved Before; Lady Gaga & Bradley Cooper – A Star Is Born; Laura Marano & Noah Centineo – The Perfect Date; Katherine McNamara & Dominic Sherwood – Shadowhunters; Madelaine Petsch & Vanessa Morgan – Riverdale	**The Dolan Twins**; James Corden; Ellen DeGeneres; Tiffany Haddish; Kevin Hart; Lilly Singh
