= Nathan Gamble =

American actor (born 1998)

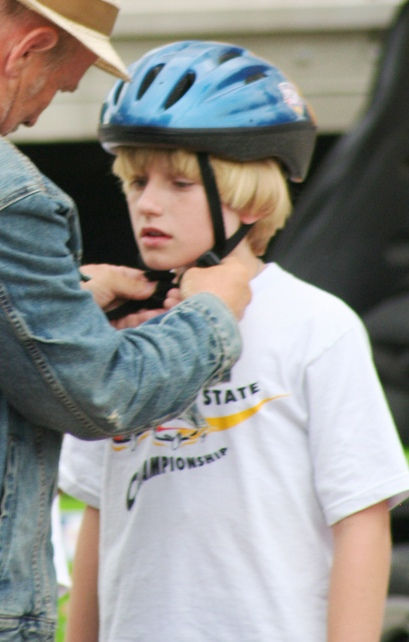
- Gamble on the set of 25 Hill at Baruth Raceway in Cleveland, July 2010
- Born: Nathan Lee Gamble; January 12, 1998 (age 28); Tacoma, Washington, U.S.
- Occupation: Actor
- Years active: 2006–present
- Spouse: Hannah Hammond (m. 2025)

Nathan Lee Gamble (born January 12, 1998) is an American actor who made his feature film debut in Babel (2006), for which he was nominated for a 2007 Young Artist Award. He is best known for his role as Sawyer Nelson in Dolphin Tale and the sequel Dolphin Tale 2.

== Life and career ==
Gamble was born Nathan Lee Gamble on January 12, 1998 in Tacoma, Washington, the son of theater directors, Christy (née Prestridge) and Gregory "Greg" Gamble, who also run a drama camp for children. His additional screen credits include Dry Rain (2007), Saving Sam (2007), Diggers (2007), The Mist (2007), The Dark Knight (2008), Marley & Me (2008), The Hole (2009), Dolphin Tale (2011) and Dolphin Tale 2 (2014).

On television, Gamble appeared in Runaway in 2006; crossover episodes of CSI: Crime Scene Investigation and Without a Trace in 2007; and House M.D. and Ghost Whisperer in 2008. In 2009, he played the role of Henry Pryor, son of the titular character in Hank. In 2010, he played the role of Daniel in a short film called Displaced; the film was commissioned by the city of Seattle as part of the Water Calling series and aired at Seattle Channel.

Gamble has completed filming the role of Poe Malloy in Captain Cook's Extraordinary Atlas for Warner Bros. Television. He portrayed Lucas Thompson in the film The Hole, which was released in 2009.

His first lead role was in the 2011 film Dolphin Tale, where he plays Sawyer Nelson, a young boy who discovers a dolphin caught in a crab trap in Florida (based on the real-life story of Winter the dolphin). He reprised his role as Sawyer Nelson in the 2014 sequel, Dolphin Tale 2.

It was revealed in May 2025 that Gamble would be starring in the Chris Dowling film Bad Counselors along side Matt Cornett, Missi Pyle, Brec Bassinger and Chris Klein.

== Personal life ==
Gamble began dating his girlfriend Hannah Hammond in July 2020. They became engaged on July 23, 2025. They revealed in October 2025 that they had eloped on August 1, 2025.

== Filmography ==
Film
Year	Title	Role	Notes
2006	Babel	Mike Jones	
2007	Deeply Irresponsible		
2007	Diggers	Boy	Short
2007	The Mist	Billy Drayton	
2008	Dry Rain	Joey	Short
2008	The Dark Knight	James Gordon Jr.	
2008	Marley & Me	Patrick Grogan (Age 10)	
2009	Captain Cook's Extraordinary Atlas	Poe Malloy	TV movie
2009	The Hole	Lucas Thompson	
2010	Displaced	Daniel	Short
2011	Fetch	Linney	Short
2011	25 Hill	Trey Caldwell	
2011	Dolphin Tale	Sawyer Nelson	
2012	The Frontier	Samuel Hale	TV movie
2012	All My Presidents	Franklin - Age 13	Short
2012	Dear Dracula	Sam (voice)	Video
2013	Beyond the Heavens	Oliver Henry	
2014	Dolphin Tale 2	Sawyer Nelson	
2018	Swiped	Daniel	
2019	The Choice	Son	Short

Television
Year	Title	Role	Notes
2007	CSI: Crime Scene Investigation	Kobe Farentino	Episode: "Who and What"
2007	Without a Trace	Kobe Farentino	Episode: "Where and Why"
2006–2008	Runaway	Tommy / Tommy Rader / Holland	9 episodes
2008	Ghost Whisperer	Elliot Haley	Episode: "Deadbeat Dads"
2008	House M.D.	Evan	Episode: "Emancipation"
2009	Hank	Henry Pryor	9 episodes
2010	Private Practice	Cody	Episode: "Another Second Chance"
2010	Good Luck Charlie	Austin	Episode: "Teddy Rebounds"
2011	NCIS: Los Angeles	Shawn Cameron Calder	Episode: "Cyber Threat"
2014	CSI: Crime Scene Investigation	Mason Brewer	Episode: "The Book of Shadows"
2015-2016	The Goldbergs	Garry Ball	6 episodes
2016	Mary + Jane	Mason	Episode: "YouCube"
2016	Maron	Ben	Episode: "Amends"
2017	Bones	Gene Frong	Episode: "The Flaw in The Saw"

== Awards and nominations ==
Year	Nominated work	Award	Results
2007	Babel	Young Artist Award for Best Performance in a Feature Film – Young Actor Age Ten or Younger	Nominated
2007	The Mist	Fright Meter Award for Best Supporting Actor	Nominated
2008	The Mist	Young Artist Award for Best Performance in a Feature Film - Young Actor Age Ten or Younger	Nominated
2009	Marley & Me	Young Artist Awards for Best Performance in a Feature Film - Supporting Young Actor	Nominated
2009	House	Young Artist Award for Best Performance in a TV Series - Guest Starring Young Actor	Nominated
2012	25 Hill	MovieGuide Awards for Most Inspiring Performance in Movies	Nominated
2012	Dolphin Tale	Young Artist Award for Best Leading Young Actor in a Feature Film	Nominated
2015	Dolphin Tale 2	Young Artist Award for Best Leading Young Actor in a Feature Film	Nominated
