= Teenage Bonnie and Klepto Clyde =

- Directed by: John Shepphird
- Written by: Steve Jankowski; John Shepphird
- Produced by: Steve Jankowski
- Starring: Maureen Flannigan; Scott Wolf; Bentley Mitchum
- Cinematography: Neal Brown
- Edited by: Brent White
- Music by: Terry Plumeri
- Production companies: 21st Century Film Corporation; Trimark Pictures
- Distributed by: Trimark Home Video
- Release dates: August 27, 1993 (United States); December 15, 1993 (video release)
- Running time: 90 minutes
- Country: United States
- Language: English

Teenage Bonnie and Klepto Clyde is a 1993 American romantic crime film co-written and directed by John Shepphird and starring Maureen Flannigan as Bonnie and Scott Wolf as Clyde.

== Premise ==
A modern-day retelling of the story of 1930s bank robbers Bonnie and Clyde where two teenagers, Bonnie and Clyde, are drawn to a life of crime. The two young lovers begin with shoplifting and work their way up to wanted felons as they make a run for the Mexican border.

== Cast ==
- Maureen Flannigan as Bonnie
- Scott Wolf as Clyde
- Bentley Mitchum as Kirk
- Tom Bower as Peter Baker
- Don Novello as Sanchez

== Production ==
The film was first pitched to financiers at the Marché du Film in May 1992.

Filming began in August 1992, with locations including Salt Lake City, Utah.

== Release ==
After originally being given an NC-17 rating by the MPAA, the filmmakers appealed and the rating was changed to an R. The film was given a limited theatrical release on August 27, 1993, and was released to video that December.

== Reception ==
Entertainment Weekly gave the film a grade of C− and said, "Young leads Wolf and Flannigan (as a police chief’s daughter gone bad) are surprisingly appealing, but whatever goodwill they earn is spent by the end, when this pointless movie ineptly rips off the original Bonnie and Clyde’s climactic massacre."
