= Collins Key =

American YouTuber and magician

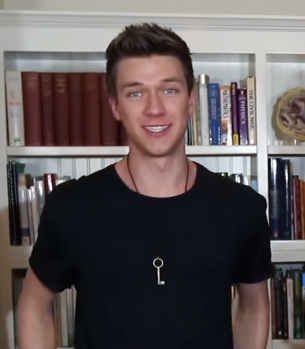
- Key in 2014
- Born: May 9, 1996 (age 30); Los Angeles, California, U.S.
- Occupations: YouTuber; entertainer; comedian; magician

YouTube information
- Channel: Collins Key
- Years active: 2011–2021
- Genres: Magic tricks; Entertainment
- Subscribers: 23.9 million
- Views: 6.71 billion
- Last updated: March 2024

Collins Key (born May 9, 1996) is an American YouTuber, entertainer, comedian, and magician. As of March 2024, his channel has amassed nearly 24 million subscribers, generating more than 75 million views per month with over 6.7 billion total lifetime views. As a magician, he was a finalist on the eighth season of America's Got Talent, and later toured as part of Demi Lovato's Neon Lights tour.

Key created and starred in a campaign for AT&T called The Disappearing Girl, for which he received a number of awards. Key has also been nominated for multiple Teen Choice Awards.

== Early life ==
Key was born on May 9, 1996, in Los Angeles, California. His parents are Steven and Anne Key, and he has a younger brother, Devan Key, who he regularly collaborates with on his YouTube channel. At age 13, after doing magic for nine months, he was accepted into the elite Junior Program at the Hollywood Famous Magic Castle.

== Career ==
At 16 years of age, Key was discovered on YouTube by the producers of America's Got Talent, and invited to appear on their eighth season. Key became the first magician to make the finals of the show. He is often referred to as "Magic’s First Pop Star". In 2013, he toured across the country with America’s Got Talent, visiting 36 cities in six weeks.

In 2014, Key joined Demi Lovato on her Neon Lights tour, opening for the singer with other acts such as Fifth Harmony, Little Mix, and Cher Lloyd. Each night, Key hosted and performed magic. In addition, he was asked to present at the 2014 Teen Choice Awards alongside other presenters including Jennifer Lopez, Taylor Swift and Kylie Jenner.

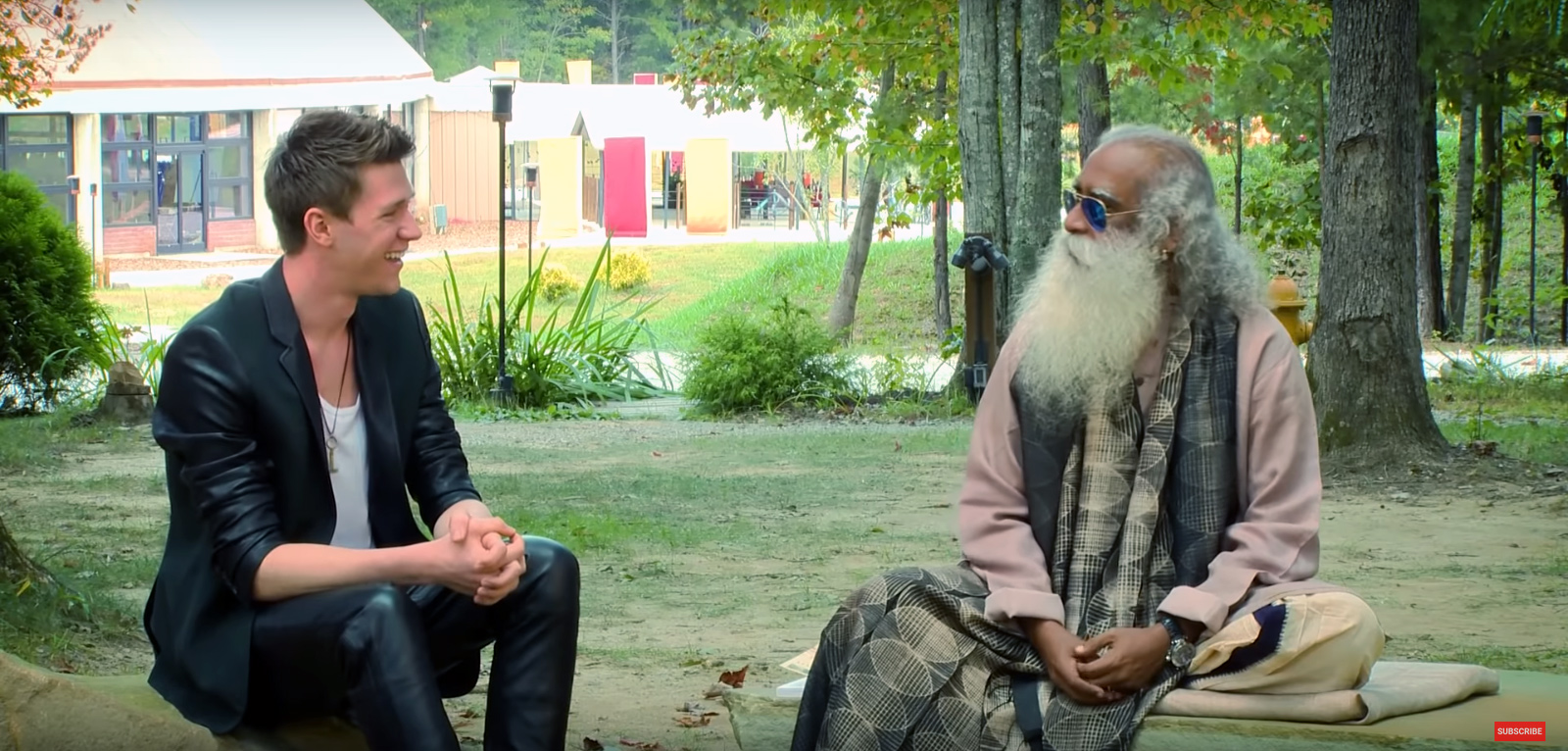
Collins Key, performing magic tricks with Jaggi Vasudev (September 2020)

After his appearance on America's Got Talent, he focused on his YouTube channel, growing from 2 million to 18 million subscribers in two years. He and his brother, Devan, primarily upload comedy videos. He also created, produced and starred in web series The Disappearing Girl in partnership with AT&T. The series won a Shorty Award, an AdWeek Arc Award, a Cannes Lions Award, and a Streamy Award.

In 2017, Key was the first digital creator given the opportunity to create and produce six weeks of interstitial content for Disney Channel leading into the Fall Season Friday Night Lineup. The same year, he gave a TEDx talk at the University of Santa Barbara about his experiences as a magician.

In 2018, Key headlined the YouTube FanFest concert in Mumbai, India, and was nominated for Choice Male Web Star and Choice Comedy Web Star at the 2018 Teen Choice Awards. In 2020 he surpassed 22.5 million subscribers on YouTube.
