= Swiped (2018 film) =

2018 American film

- Promotional poster
- Directed by: Ann Deborah Fishman
- Written by: Ann Deborah Fishman
- Produced by: Ann Deborah Fishman
- Starring: Kendall Sanders; Noah Centineo; Nathan Gamble; Kristen Johnston; George Hamilton; Leigh-Allyn Baker; Alana Collins Stewart; Christian Hutcherson; Shelby Wulfert; Maddy Curley; Steve Daron; Kalani Hilliker
- Cinematography: Jon Schellenger
- Edited by: Ian Fyfe; Jon Schellenger
- Music by: Anthony Espina
- Production company: Night Dove Pictures
- Distributed by: iTunes; Netflix
- Release date: November 6, 2018
- Running time: 93 minutes
- Country: United States
- Language: English

Swiped is a 2018 American coming-of-age romantic comedy film directed by Ann Deborah Fishman, who also wrote the screenplay and executive produced. The film stars Kendall Sanders, Noah Centineo, Nathan Gamble, Kristen Johnston, George Hamilton, Leigh-Allyn Baker, Alana Collins Stewart, Christian Hutcherson, Shelby Wulfert, Maddy Curley, Steve Daron, and Kalani Hilliker.

== Plot ==
Introverted freshman college student James is roommates with Lance, a wealthy student who's very successful with girls and only interested in casual hookups. As James stands out as being the strongest student in a basic programming course they share, Lance approaches him initially proposing he do minimal work so no one else in the class has to work.

When Lance and his friends decide they want to develop an app for hookups, he talks to James and discovers he's been coding since he was young. Lance enlists him to develop the ultimate hookup app, matching people across the campus with no strings attached. In exchange he will pay for him to transfer to an Ivy league school.

James takes over their dorm room so he can work day and night on the app Jungle. The goal of the app is to connect people physically with no commitment of any kind. No numbers or names are exchanged, so the people have guaranteed one-night stands.

Not wanting to be blamed for Jungle, James asks Lance to claim it as his own. Their computer science professor excuses him from having to do work in her class, as he's supposedly coding constantly.

Christmas break arrives, and James starts to see the consequences of the app with his divorced parents. His dad brings a very young date to Christmas, who he found on Jungle, and then his mother is convinced to try it by her friends. He tries to follow her as she meets up with new people, remorseful of his involvement with the app.

The following day, James tries to get his grandparents and their friends to answer a questionnaire on their past sexual and relationship experience. When he finds his mom back on Jungle, he quickly takes it and other similar apps down to stop her. Soon Lance and company hear about it and hound James to get it up and running.

When James returns to campus, he hides from Lance and his friends in Hannah's sorority house. He is allowed to stay only if he creates a relationship app for them. Going back to his room briefly, James is intercepted by Lance and their friends who coerce him to stay and get their app running again. He tricks them with a relaxing tea, and scurries back to the sorority.

James stays safe in the sorority house protected by the sisters until Lance leaks to the press James' involvement. When Hannah hears this she confronts him, and he confesses that he worked on the app in hopes of connecting with her. As she never downloaded it, it failed in his eyes. James encourages them all to stay off all of the apps to force the guys to connect for real. After he confesses his feelings for Hannah, they kiss.

== Cast ==
- Kendall Sanders as James Wilson Singer
- Noah Centineo as Lance Black
- Nathan Gamble as Daniel
- Christian Hutcherson as Wesley
- Shelby Wulfert as Hannah Grace Martin
- Chase Victoria as Rachel
- Shein Mompremier as Melody
- Kristen Johnston as Professor Barnes
- George Hamilton as Phil Singer
- Leigh-Allyn Baker as Leah Singer
- Alana Collins Stewart as Sunny Singer
- Maddy Curley as Tiffany
- Steve Daron as Justin
- Kalani Hilliker as Ashley Singer

== Production ==
Principal photography took place in Palm Beach County, Florida in July 2016. The film was released on iTunes and Netflix in the USA on November 6, 2018, and in several other countries, including the UK, Spain, Italy, and Norway, on July 1, 2019.

== Reception ==
Swiped received mostly negative reviews from critics. On the review aggregation website Rotten Tomatoes, the film holds an approval rating of 20% based on five reviews, with an average rating of 3.1/10.
