= Favored Nations (nonprofit) =

Non-profit mediator

- Formation: 2019
- Type: NGO, 501(c)(3)
- Legal status: Inactive
- Purpose: Civil rights, environment, clean energy, LGBTQ, mental health
- Headquarters: 137 N Larchmont Blvd.
- Location: Los Angeles, United States of America
- Region served: USA
- Methods: Funding, Program Support, Advocacy
- Founders: Noah Centineo (CEO), Josh Heller (CMO)
- Website: www.favorednations.org

Favored Nations is a 501(c)(3) charity that functions as a mediator between donors and other nonprofit organizations. The organization is built on a network of individuals who donate monetarily or volunteer in its charity campaigns and operations.

Favored Nations was established in 2019 by Josh Heller and Noah Centineo, and is based out of Los Angeles, California. The organization is mostly active in the United States. It has taken part in several campaigns related to the human rights movement, voting rights, and the COVID-19 pandemic.

== Overview ==
Favored Nations was registered by Noah Centineo and Josh Heller in 2019, and launched in early 2020, with the main office located in Los Angeles, California. The organization gained significant media attention and attracted a number of celebrities and influencers to its philanthropic cause.

== Management model ==
Favored Nations uses social media networks and e-commerce to raise funds for its charity activity. The nonprofit also designs for sale a variety of merchandise in collaboration with celebrities and influencers and then acts as an intermediary between donors and charities, where each donor can contribute to a charity from the list of nonprofit organizations including Black Lives Matter, HeadCount, Policing Equity, Know Your Rights Camp, Color of Change, The Bail Project, and the Florida Rights Restoration Coalition, among many others. As of 2021, the majority of funding is distributed among four main program areas: The COVID-19 Emergency Relief Fund, Educational Development, Civil Rights Movements and Charity Partner Support.

It was founded by Noah Centineo (born 1996), an American actor who is CEO, and Josh Heller (born 1987), an American entrepreneur and actor. He is a co-founder of Favored Nations, where he is Chief Marketing Officer. Heller has been instrumental in a number of the nonprofit's campaigns, including COVID-19 Emergency Relief Fund, Voting Campaign, and Black Lives Matter Support.

== Operations and campaigns ==
The nonprofit's most notable campaigns and initiatives include the COVID-19 Relief Fund, Black Lives Matter Support, (in which Centineo and Lana Condor act out scenes from the popular Netflix movie series), March for Democracy in collaboration with the HeadCount, and an Art House gallery in Los Angeles, aiming to turn out the Generation Z vote in the 2020 U.S. presidential election.
