= Noah Centineo =

American actor, philanthropist (born 1996)

- Centineo in 2026
- Born: Noah Gregory Centineo; May 9, 1996 (age 30); Miami, Florida, U.S.
- Occupations: Actor, NGO executive
- Years active: 2009–present
- Organization: Favored Nations (CEO)

Noah Gregory Centineo (/ˌsɛntɪˈneɪ.oʊ/ SEN-tih-NAY-oh; born May 9, 1996) is an American actor. He began his career performing on television, first in roles on Disney Channel and Nickelodeon, most notably on Austin & Ally (2011–2012), and later had a breakout role as Jesus Adams Foster in the Freeform drama series The Fosters (2015–2018). He achieved wider recognition by starring in the Netflix romantic comedy films To All the Boys franchise (2018–2021), Sierra Burgess Is a Loser (2018), and The Perfect Date (2019).

Centineo has since played Atom Smasher in the superhero film Black Adam (2022) and the title role in the Netflix spy adventure series The Recruit (2022–2025).

== Early life ==
Noah Gregory Centineo was born in Miami, Florida, and raised in Boca Raton. He is of Italian and Pennsylvania Dutch (German) descent. He has an older sister. He attended BAK Middle School of the Arts and then Boca Raton Community High School for ninth and tenth grade, and played soccer there. In 2012, he moved to Los Angeles and attended Agoura High School.

When he was six years old, a Mastiff dog lunged at him and he has distinct facial scar from when he was attacked.

== Career ==
In 2009, Centineo starred as the lead in the family film The Gold Retrievers. He had small roles in the Disney Channel sitcoms Austin & Ally, Shake It Up, and Jessie. He co-starred as Jaden Stark in the Disney Channel Original Movie How to Build a Better Boy (2014). In the same year, he was cast as Ben Eastman in the Disney Channel comedy pilot Growing Up and Down, which was not picked up to series.

In 2015, Centineo was cast in the main role of Jesus Adams Foster in ABC Family/Freeform's drama series The Fosters where the character was previously portrayed by Jake T. Austin in seasons 1–2. He made his first appearance in season three's episode "Lucky," which aired on August 17, 2015. In 2017, he was nominated for the Teen Choice Award for Choice Summer TV Star: Male for his performance. In 2017, Centineo starred as Hawk Carter in go90's teen drama-thriller series Tagged which ended in 2018. He portrayed surfer/artist Johnny Sanders Jr. in the coming-of-age romantic comedy SPF-18. Also that year he appeared as Camila Cabello's love interest in the music video for her single "Havana."

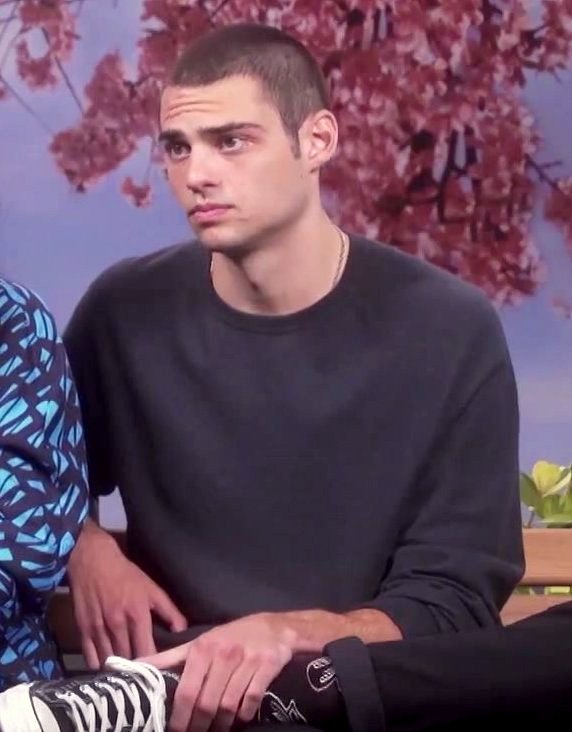
Centineo promoting the film To All the Boys: P.S. I Still Love You in 2020

Centineo starred as Peter Kavinsky in the Netflix teen comedy original movie To All the Boys film series adapted from Jenny Han's romance novel, beginning with To All the Boys I've Loved Before. He received positive reviews and became a teen idol. He also starred as Jamey in Sierra Burgess Is a Loser and Lance Black in Swiped. In 2019, he played the lead role of Brooks Rattigan in another Netflix romantic comedy film, The Perfect Date, which was released in April. He also had a supporting part in the reboot of Charlie's Angels, which was released in November 2019.

In 2020, he returned as Peter Kavinsky in the sequels To All the Boys: P.S. I Still Love You and To All the Boys: Always and Forever. He was set to play He-Man in Masters of the Universe (2026), a film based on the franchise of the same name to be released by Amazon MGM Studios and Sony Pictures, but in April 2021 he dropped out of the film. Centineo appeared in the DCEU movie Black Adam playing Albert Rothstein / Atom Smasher. It was announced that he is negotiating for a role in a film about the 2021 GameStop short squeeze. Centineo starred in and executive produced the Netflix spy-adventure series The Recruit, released in December 2022.

In April 2024, it was announced that Centineo had joined the cast of Warfare, an A24 war movie written and directed by Alex Garland and Ray Mendoza.

In May 2025, Centineo was confirmed for the role of Ken Masters in the Street Fighter reboot film. In August 2025, Centineo was cast as young John Rambo in the upcoming prequel film. In November 2025, Centineo was cast opposite Sydney Sweeney in a live-action film adaptation of the Gundam franchise.

== Philanthropy ==
In 2019, Centineo co-founded Favored Nations with his friend Josh Heller, a Los Angeles–based actor and lifestyle photographer. Centineo was inspired to found the nonprofit after teaming with Omaze for a contest that raised $280,000 for charity; the prize was a chance to go on a hike and have dinner with him. Centineo is CEO and Heller the chief marketing officer. The 501(c)(3) nonprofit produces and sells a variety of merchandise in collaboration with celebrities and influencers. They are an intermediary between donors and charities; each donor can contribute to a charity from a list of nonprofit organizations that includes Black Lives Matter, Policing Equity, Know Your Rights Camp, Color of Change, The Bail Project, and the Florida Rights Restoration Coalition. The organization has attracted many celebrities and influencers to participate in philanthropic activity. In 2020, Centineo also got Favored Nations involved in a campaign to get out the vote for the 2020 US presidential election. He and Heller opened a voting-themed art house and virtual tour to increase voter participation.

== Personal life ==
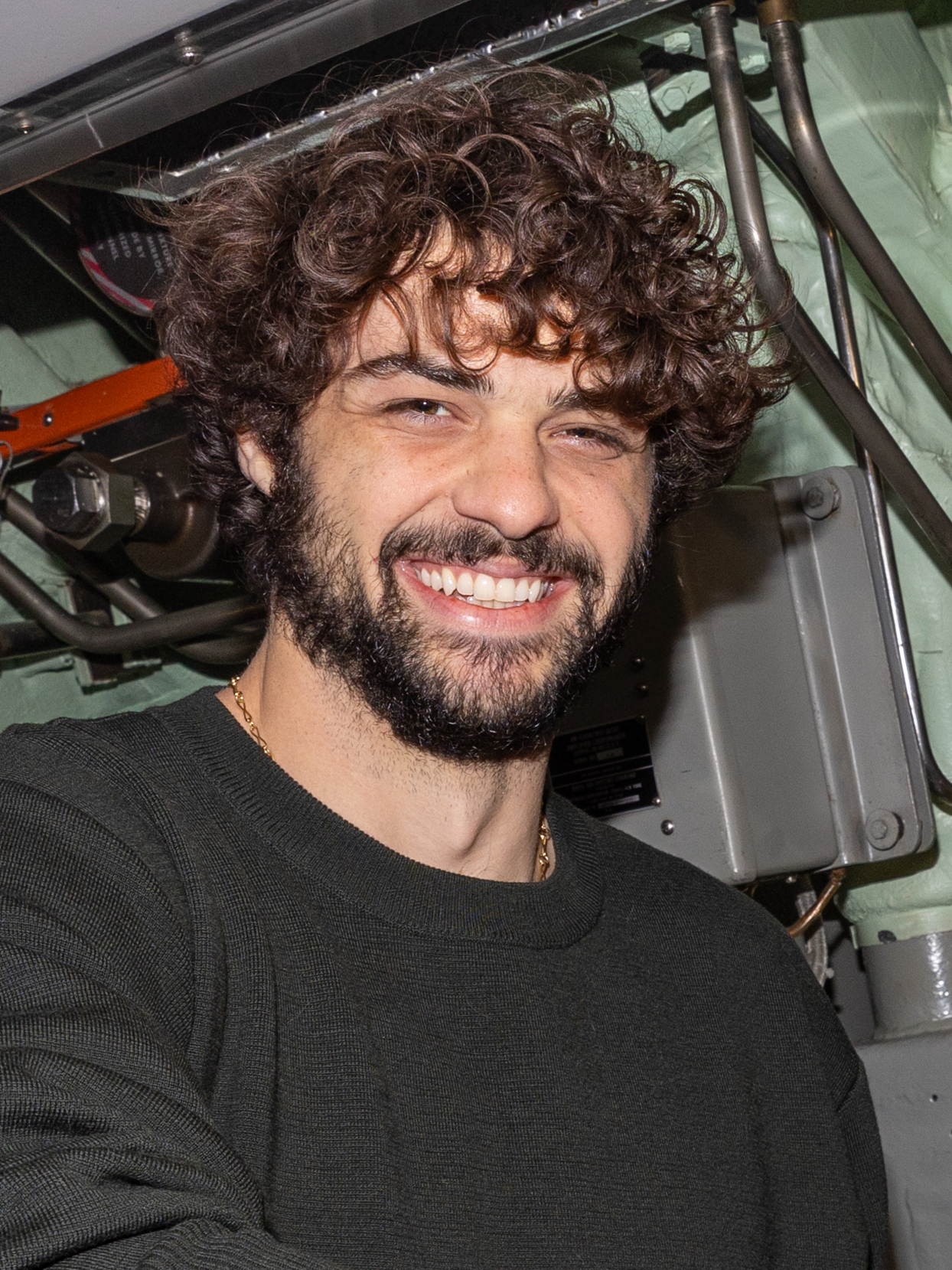
Centineo visiting Naval Station Norfolk in 2025

In February 2020, Centineo revealed that from age 17 to 21, he had experienced "a really dark time in [his] life," during which he used alcohol and drugs. After his 21st birthday, he became sober for a year.

Centineo was in a relationship with model Alexis Ren from March 2019 to April 2020.

== Filmography ==
Key
†	Denotes productions that have not yet been released

=== Film ===
Year	Title	Role	Notes
2009	The Gold Retrievers	Josh Peters	
2011	Turkles	David	
2017	SPF-18	Johnny Sanders Jr.	
2017	Can't Take It Back	Jake Roberts	
2018	To All the Boys I've Loved Before	Peter Kavinsky	
2018	Sierra Burgess Is a Loser	Jamey	
2018	Swiped	Lance Black	
2019	The Perfect Date	Brooks Rattigan	
2019	Charlie's Angels	Langston	
2020	To All the Boys: P.S. I Still Love You	Peter Kavinsky	
2021	To All the Boys: Always and Forever	Peter Kavinsky	
2022	Black Adam	Albert Rothstein / Atom Smasher	
2023	Dream Scenario	Dylan	Cameo
2025	Warfare	Brian / Zawi	
2025	Our Hero, Balthazar	Anthony	Also executive producer
2026	Union County	Jack Parsons	
2026	Iconoclast †	TBA	Also producer
2026	Street Fighter	Ken Masters	
2027	John Rambo †	John J. Rambo	Post-production
TBA	Gundam †	TBA	Filming; also producer

=== Television ===
Year	Title	Role	Notes
2011–2012	Austin & Ally	Dallas	Recurring role
2013	Marvin Marvin	Blaine Hotman	Episode: "Double Date"
2013	Shake It Up	Monroe	Episode: "Psych It Up"
2013	Ironside	Boy #2	Episode: "Minor Infractions"
2014	Growing Up and Down	Ben Eastman	Unsold pilot
2014	Jessie	Rick Larkin	Episode: "Hoedown Showdown"
2014	See Dad Run	Carson Castle	Episode: "See Dad Watch Janie Run Away"
2014	Newsreaders	Josh	Episode: "F- Dancing, Are You Decent?"
2014	How to Build a Better Boy	Jaden Stark	Television film
2015–2018	The Fosters	Jesus Adams Foster	Main cast (seasons 3–5)
2017–2018	Tagged	Hawk Carter	Recurring role
2019	Good Trouble	Jesus Adams Foster	Episodes: "Byte Club" and "A Very Coterie Christmas"
2020	#KidsTogether: The Nickelodeon Town Hall	Himself	Television special
2022–2025	The Recruit	Owen Hendricks	Main cast; also executive producer
2025	XO, Kitty	Peter Kavinsky	Episode: "Kiss and Make Up"

=== Music videos ===
Year	Title	Artist(s)	Notes
2017	"Havana"	Camila Cabello featuring Young Thug	
2019	"Save Me Tonight"	Arty	Also director
2019	"Are You Bored Yet?"	Wallows featuring Clairo	

== Awards and nominations ==
Award	Year	Category	Work	Result	Ref.
IMDb Awards	2018	Top 10 Breakout Stars Award (Note: shared with Hannah John-Kamen, Jacob Elordi, Jessica Barden, John Krasinski, Kiernan Shipka, Martha Higareda, Michael B. Jordan, Olivia Cooke and Tessa Thompson)		Won	
MTV Movie & TV Awards	2019	Best Kiss (Note: shared with Lana Condor)	To All the Boys I've Loved Before	Won	
MTV Movie & TV Awards	2019	Best Breakthrough Performance	To All the Boys I've Loved Before	Won	
Nickelodeon Kids' Choice Awards	2019	Movie Actor	To All the Boys I've Loved Before	Won	
People's Choice Awards	2019	Favorite Comedy Movie Star	The Perfect Date	Won	
People's Choice Awards	2020	Favorite Comedy Movie Star	To All the Boys: P.S. I Still Love You	Nominated	
Teen Choice Awards	2017	Choice Summer TV Star Male	The Fosters	Nominated	
Teen Choice Awards	2019	Choice Drama Movie Actor	To All the Boys I've Loved Before	Nominated	
Teen Choice Awards	2019	Choice Movie Ship	To All the Boys I've Loved Before	Nominated	
Teen Choice Awards	2019	Choice Movie Ship (Note: shared with Laura Marano)	The Perfect Date	Nominated	
Teen Choice Awards	2019	Choice Comedy Movie Actor	The Perfect Date	Won	
