= Maureen Flannigan =

American actress

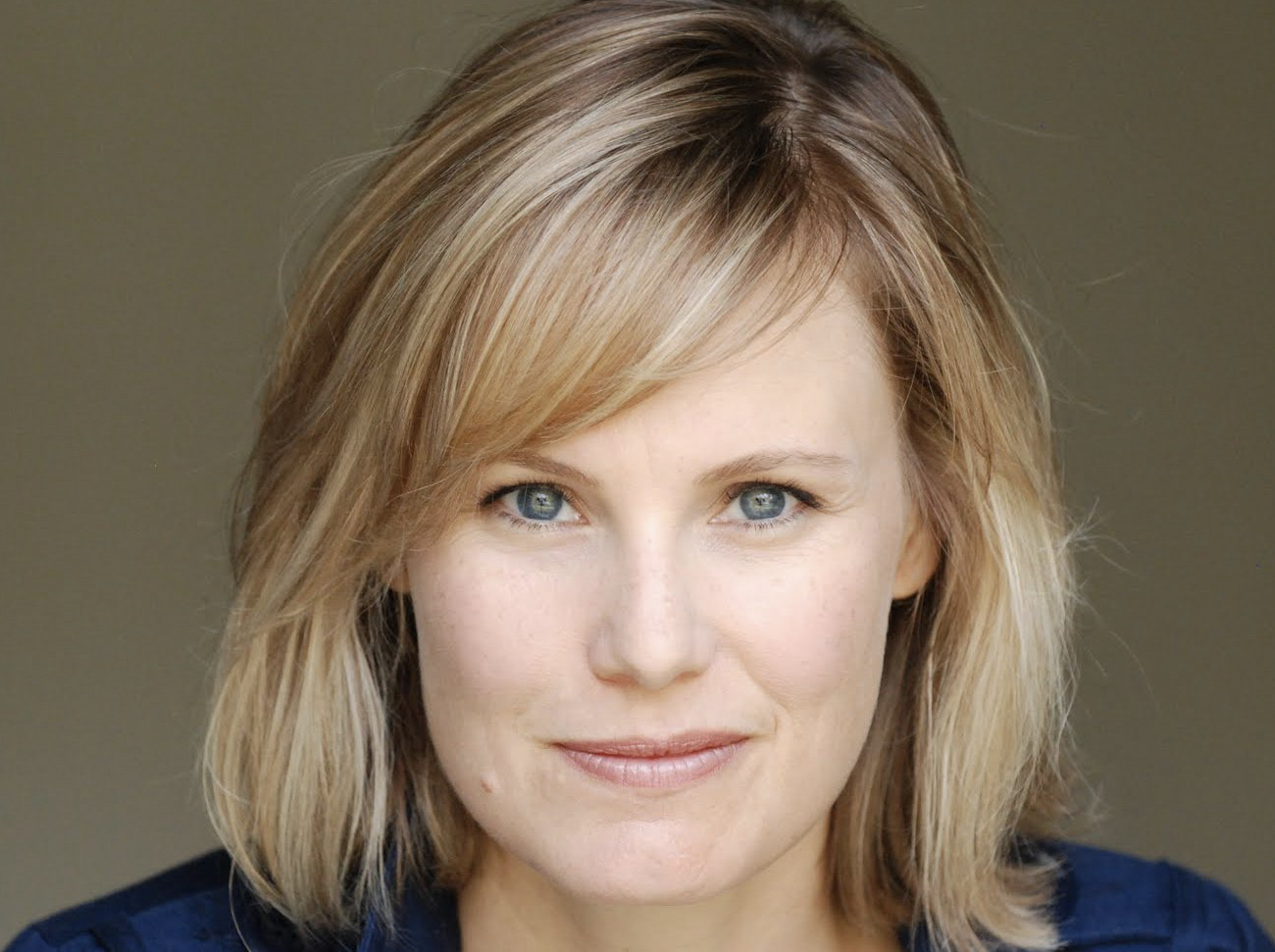
- Occupations: Actress, Producer, Director, Filmmaker
- Years active: 1985–2011
- Known for: Out of This World; 7th Heaven

Maureen Flannigan is an American documentary filmmaker and former child actress. She is perhaps best known for her role as teenager Evie Ethel Garland on the fantasy sitcom Out of This World, which ran from 1987 to 1991.

== Early life ==
Flannigan graduated with a Bachelor of Arts degree from the USC School of Theater. She appeared in productions of Macbeth, The Crucible and William Saroyan's The Cave Dwellers.

== Film and television ==
Flannigan made her television debut in a guest starring role in an episode of Highway to Heaven. Two years later, in 1987, Flannigan landed the role of Evie Garland in the first-run syndication children's comedy series Out of This World, starring with Donna Pescow and Joe Alaskey. She stayed with the show until its cancellation in 1991.

Flannigan had a recurring role on The WB's 7th Heaven as Shana Sullivan, the girlfriend of Matt Camden. She was in the ABC soap opera Push, playing swimmer Erin Galway. She has also appeared on Star Trek: Deep Space Nine, ER, Law & Order: Special Victims Unit, Starved, Close to Home, Kindred: The Embraced and 90210.

Flannigan has also acted in films. She starred in Teenage Bonnie and Klepto Clyde (1993), National Lampoon's Last Resort (1994), Written in Blood (2003), A Day Without a Mexican (2004), and Homecoming (2005). In 2010 she appeared in the film Do Not Disturb, which she also co-produced.

== Filmography ==
=== Film ===
| Year | Title | Role | Notes |
|---|---|---|---|
| 1993 | Teenage Bonnie and Klepto Clyde | Bonnie Baker | |
| 1994 | Last Resort | Sonja | Video |
| 1997 | Goodbye America | Angela | |
| 2003 | Written in Blood | Jude Traveller | |
| 2004 | A Day Without a Mexican | Mary Jo Quintana | |
| 2005 | Homecoming | Ashley | |
| 2010 | Do Not Disturb | Sherry | Segment: "Duccios Madonna" |
| 2011 | 25 Hill | Maggie Caldwell | |

=== Television ===
| Year | Title | Role | Notes |
|---|---|---|---|
| 1985 | Highway to Heaven | Sandy | Episode: "Birds of a Feather" |
| 1987–1991 | Out of This World | Evie Ethel Garland | Main role |
| 1988 | High Mountain Rangers | Haley Dawkins | Episode: "Old Friends, New Friends" |
| 1992 | CBS Schoolbreak Special | Sherie | Episode: "Two Teens and a Baby" |
| 1994 | Northern Exposure | Miranda at 18 | Episode: "Hello, I Love You" |
| 1994 | Lifestories: Families in Crisis | Mia | Episode: "Confronting Brandon: The Intervention of an Addict" |
| 1995 | She Fought Alone | Abby | TV film |
| 1996 | Kindred: The Embraced | Ruth Doyle | Episode: "Bad Moon Rising" |
| 1998 | Push | Erin Galway | Main role |
| 1998 | Star Trek: Deep Space Nine | Mika | "Covenant" |
| 1998–2000 & 2002 | 7th Heaven | Shana Sullivan | Recurring role (season 3), main role (season 4), guest (season 6) |
| 2000 | At Any Cost | Chelsea | TV film |
| 2001 | Boston Public | Holly Carpenter | Episode: "Chapter 21" |
| 2003 | Book of Days | Frankie | TV film |
| 2003 | ER | Mrs. Gamble | Episode: "Shifts Happen" |
| 2004 | Law & Order: Special Victims Unit | Louise | Episode: "Doubt" |
| 2005 | Starved | Amy Roundtree | Recurring role |
| 2007 | Close to Home | Cindy Myers | Episode: "Drink the Cup" |
| 2009 | 90210 | Leslie | Episodes: "Between a Sign and a Hard Place", "One Party Can Ruin Your Whole Summer" |
| 2011 | Second City This Week | Guest | Episode: "A Newt Beginning" |
