= Teen Choice Award for Choice Music – Electronic/Dance Artist =

List of award winners and nominees

The following is a list of Teen Choice Award winners and nominees for Choice Electronic/Dance Artist.

== Winners and nominees ==
=== 2010s ===
Year	Winner	Nominees	Ref.
2014	Calvin Harris	Martin Garrix; Kaskade; Skrillex; Zedd	
2017	Calvin Harris	Steve Aoki; Martin Garrix; David Guetta; Major Lazer; Zedd	
2018	The Chainsmokers	Steve Aoki; Martin Garrix; Calvin Harris; Marshmello; Zedd	
