= The Perfect Date =

- Promotional release poster
- Directed by: Chris Nelson
- Screenplay by: Steve Bloom; Randall Green
- Story by: Steve Bloom
- Based on: The Stand-In by Steve Bloom
- Produced by: Matt Kaplan; John Tomko
- Starring: Noah Centineo; Laura Marano; Odiseas Georgiadis; Camila Mendes; Matt Walsh
- Cinematography: Bartosz Nalazek
- Edited by: Brad Wilhite; Tara Timpone
- Music by: Joe Wong
- Production companies: Ace Entertainment; AwesomenessFilms
- Distributed by: Netflix
- Release date: April 12, 2019 (United States)
- Running time: 90 minutes
- Country: United States
- Language: English
- Budget: $5.7 million

The Perfect Date is a 2019 American teen romantic comedy film, directed by Chris Nelson from a screenplay by Steve Bloom and Randall Green. It is based on the novel The Stand-In by Steve Bloom, published by Carolrohda Lab in October 2017. The film stars Noah Centineo, Laura Marano, Camila Mendes, Odiseas Georgiadis and Matt Walsh.

The film was released on April 12, 2019, by Netflix.

== Plot ==
Brooks Rattigan is a teenage boy with dreams of getting into Yale, while his father, Charlie wants him to go to the University of Connecticut, which has offered him a full scholarship. He works at a sub shop with his best friend, programmer Murph, but financing his college dreams proves troubling.

Brooks seizes the opportunity to make some extra money by posing as the boyfriend of his classmate's wealthy cousin Celia Lieberman of Greenwich. He finds he has a knack for dating with his adaptable personality. Brooks meets beautiful but snobby Shelby and makes it his goal to win her over. He lies to her, telling her he is from affluent Darien rather than working class Bridgeport.

Murph creates and launches an app for Brooks, selling him as the plus-one for all occasions. After finding out that Celia has a crush on Franklin Volley, they set up a plan to fake break-up, in which each of them gets to be with Shelby and Franklin respectively. As business booms for Brooks, Murph feels neglected and cuts him off. Celia sets up an interview for Brooks at Yale, and is upset when she discovers he researched the Dean previously so lied to him in order to be liked. He justifies himself, saying that it is no different from what he has been doing with his app.

Celia realizes that Franklin is not the person for her, however does not tell Brooks. When they conduct their fake break up, she is hurt by his words, and slaps him. Brooks is under the impression that it is all part of the act. Following the "break-up", Shelby kisses Brooks and asks him to accompany her to her school formal. They find it difficult to relate to one another and struggle to hold a conversation.

At the formal, Brooks sees Leah, a girl who had used his app to "practice dating." She thanks him for helping her through his app in front of Shelby, who is offended and disgusted by the app's theme. Brooks reveals to Shelby that he is not from the wealthy town that she believes he is from, and that he needs the money to go to Yale. She calls him a liar and leaves.

Brooks approaches Celia, who is also at the dance. She declines his offer to dance, saying that she is not a backup. Brooks returns home and talks to his dad about what has been going on in his life. His dad reminds him that nobody truly knows who they are, and tells him he is proud of who his son is becoming.

Brooks decides to accept UConn's offer, because if he has to pretend to be somebody else to go to Yale, he does not want to go. He makes up with Murph and also meets up with Celia to give her a letter. In it, Brooks reflects on how his previous ambitions were to drive the fanciest car, go to the nicest school, and date the prettiest girl. But he has discovered that these ambitions made him a bad friend, an ungrateful son, and a self-obsessed person. The times when he felt the most himself was when he was with Celia and wants to be with her.

Celia visits Brooks at home and apologizes for slapping him. They then go to the sub sandwich restaurant which has been retrofitted for a party, with Murph and Tuna Melt (Murph's crush and regular customer of the sub shop) in attendance. Murph reveals his admission to UConn and Brooks reconciles with Celia, sharing a kiss. The four then continue to dance until the end of the film.

== Cast ==
- Noah Centineo as Brooks Rattigan
- Laura Marano as Celia Lieberman
- Odiseas Georgiadis as Murph
- Camila Mendes as Shelby Pace
- Matt Walsh as Charlie Rattigan
- Joe Chrest as Jerry Lieberman
- Carrie Lazar as Lilian Lieberman
- Alex Biglane as Tuna Melt on Seven Grain
- Blaine Kern III as Franklin
- Zak Steiner as Reece
- Ty Parker as Cartelli
- Wayne Péré as Mr. Newhouse
- Autumn Walker as Leah
- Ivan Hoey Jr. as Larry

== Production ==
In March 2018, it was announced Noah Centineo, Camila Mendes, Laura Marano, Matt Walsh and Odiseas Georgiadis had joined the cast of the film, then titled The Stand-In after its source novel, with Chris Nelson directing from a screenplay by Steve Bloom and Randall Green. In January 2019, it was reported that Netflix had acquired worldwide distribution rights to the film, retitled The Perfect Date.

Principal photography began in March 2018, in New Orleans.

== Release ==
The Perfect Date was released on April 12, 2019. In July 2019, Netflix reported that the film was viewed by 48 million households in its first four weeks of release.

== Reception ==
On review aggregator website Rotten Tomatoes, the film holds an approval rating of 67% based on 18 reviews, and an average rating of 6/10. The website's critical consensus reads, "Though it may not be the perfect romcom, The Perfect Date's endearing leads still manage to show viewers a fun — if overly familiar — time."
