= 2018 Teen Choice Awards =

Annual event

- Date: August 12, 2018
- Location: The Forum, Inglewood, California
- Hosted by: Nick Cannon, Lele Pons

Television/radio coverage
- Network: Fox

The 2018 Teen Choice Awards ceremony was held on August 12, 2018, at the Forum in Inglewood, California. The awards celebrated the year's achievements in music, film, television, sports, fashion, comedy, and the internet, and are voted on by viewers aged 13 and over living in the United States through various social media sites.

The biggest winner of the night was Riverdale, earning nine of its twelve nominations, including Choice Drama Series for the second year running, and only losing to itself in categories where it was nominated twice. The Greatest Showman also won big, earning five of its nine nods including Choice Drama Movie and Choice Movie Drama Actor, won by Zac Efron.

== Performers ==
Performers	Song	Ref.
Meghan Trainor	"No Excuses" "Let You Be Right"	
Lauv	"I Like Me Better"	
Foster the People	"Sit Next to Me"	
Bebe Rexha	"I'm a Mess"	
Evvie McKinney	"How Do You Feel"	
Khalid	"Young Dumb & Broke" "American Teen" "OTW"	

== Winners and nominees ==
The first wave of nominations were announced on June 13, 2018. The second wave was announced on June 22, 2018. Winners are listed first, in bold.

=== Movies ===
Choice Action Movie	Choice Action Movie Actor
**Avengers: Infinity War**; Justice League; Maze Runner: The Death Cure; Pacific Rim Uprising; Tomb Raider	**Robert Downey Jr. – Avengers: Infinity War as Tony Stark / Iron Man**; John Boyega – Pacific Rim Uprising as Jake Pentecost; Henry Cavill – Justice League as Clark Kent / Superman; Chris Evans – Avengers: Infinity War as Steve Rogers / Captain America; Tom Holland – Avengers: Infinity War as Peter Parker / Spider-Man; Dylan O'Brien – Maze Runner: The Death Cure as Thomas
Choice Action Movie Actress	Choice Sci-Fi Movie
**Scarlett Johansson – Avengers: Infinity War as Natasha Romanoff / Black Widow**; Amy Adams – Justice League as Lois Lane; Gal Gadot – Justice League as Diana Prince / Wonder Woman; Elizabeth Olsen – Avengers: Infinity War as Wanda Maximoff / Scarlet Witch; Zoe Saldaña – Avengers: Infinity War as Gamora; Alicia Vikander – Tomb Raider as Lara Croft	**Black Panther**; Blade Runner 2049; Rampage; Ready Player One; Thor: Ragnarok
Choice Sci-Fi Movie Actor	Choice Sci-Fi Movie Actress
**Chris Hemsworth – Thor: Ragnarok as Thor**; Chadwick Boseman – Black Panther as T'Challa / Black Panther; Ryan Gosling – Blade Runner 2049 as K; Dwayne Johnson – Rampage as Davis Okoye; Mark Ruffalo – Thor: Ragnarok as Bruce Banner / Hulk; Tye Sheridan – Ready Player One as Wade Watts / Parzival	**Letitia Wright – Black Panther as Shuri**; Olivia Cooke – Ready Player One as Samantha Cook / Art3mis; Danai Gurira – Black Panther as Okoye; Naomie Harris – Rampage as Dr. Kate Caldwell; Lupita Nyong'o – Black Panther as Nakia; Tessa Thompson – Thor: Ragnarok as Valkyrie
Choice Fantasy Movie	Choice Fantasy Movie Actor
**Coco**; Peter Rabbit; Star Wars: The Last Jedi; A Wrinkle in Time	**Anthony Gonzalez – Coco as Miguel**; John Boyega – Star Wars: The Last Jedi as Finn; James Corden – Peter Rabbit as Peter Rabbit; Gael García Bernal – Coco as Héctor; Mark Hamill – Star Wars: The Last Jedi as Luke Skywalker; Oscar Isaac – Star Wars: The Last Jedi as Poe Dameron
Choice Fantasy Movie Actress	Choice Drama Movie
**Carrie Fisher (Note: Fisher's nomination and win were posthumous.) – Star Wars: The Last Jedi as General Leia Organa**; Mindy Kaling – A Wrinkle in Time as Mrs. Who; Storm Reid – A Wrinkle in Time as Meg Murry; Daisy Ridley – Star Wars: The Last Jedi as Rey; Oprah Winfrey – A Wrinkle in Time as Mrs. Which; Reese Witherspoon – A Wrinkle in Time as Mrs. Whatsit	**The Greatest Showman**; Midnight Sun; Murder on the Orient Express; A Quiet Place; Truth or Dare; Wonder
Choice Drama Movie Actor	Choice Drama Movie Actress
**Zac Efron – The Greatest Showman as Phillip Carlyle**; Timothée Chalamet – Lady Bird as Kyle Scheible; Hugh Jackman – The Greatest Showman as P. T. Barnum; Leslie Odom Jr. – Murder on the Orient Express as Dr. Arbuthnot; Patrick Schwarzenegger – Midnight Sun as Charlie; Jacob Tremblay – Wonder as August "Auggie" Pullman	**Zendaya – The Greatest Showman as Anne Wheeler**; Lucy Hale – Truth or Dare as Olivia Barron; Daisy Ridley – Murder on the Orient Express as Mary Debenham; Julia Roberts – Wonder as Isabel Pullman; Saoirse Ronan – Lady Bird as Christine "Lady Bird" McPherson; Bella Thorne – Midnight Sun as Katie Price
Choice Comedy Movie	Choice Comedy Movie Actor
**Love, Simon**; Daddy's Home 2; I Feel Pretty; Jumanji: Welcome to the Jungle; Overboard; Pitch Perfect 3	**Dwayne Johnson – Jumanji: Welcome to the Jungle as Dr. Smolder Bravestone**; Jack Black – Jumanji: Welcome to the Jungle as Professor Sheldon Oberon; Eugenio Derbez – Overboard as Leonardo Montenegro; Will Ferrell – Daddy's Home 2 as Brad Whitaker; Kevin Hart – Jumanji: Welcome to the Jungle as Franklin "Mouse" Finbar; Mark Wahlberg – Daddy's Home 2 as Dusty Mayron
Choice Comedy Movie Actress	Choice Movie Villain
**Anna Kendrick – Pitch Perfect 3 as Beca Mitchell**; Anna Faris – Overboard as Kate Sullivan; Karen Gillan – Jumanji: Welcome to the Jungle as Ruby Roundhouse; Amy Schumer – I Feel Pretty as Renee Bennett; Hailee Steinfeld – Pitch Perfect 3 as Emily Junk; Rebel Wilson – Pitch Perfect 3 as Patricia "Fat Amy" Hobart	**Michael B. Jordan – Black Panther as N'Jadaka / Erik "Killmonger" Stevens**; Cate Blanchett – Thor: Ragnarok as Hela; Josh Brolin – Avengers: Infinity War as Thanos; Adam Driver – Star Wars: The Last Jedi as Kylo Ren; Aidan Gillen – Maze Runner: The Death Cure as Janson; Bill Skarsgård – It as It / Pennywise the Dancing Clown
Choice Breakout Movie Star	Choice Summer Movie
**Nick Robinson – Love, Simon as Simon Spier**; Olivia Cooke – Ready Player One as Samantha Cook / Art3mis; Sophia Lillis – It as Beverly Marsh; Keala Settle – The Greatest Showman as Lettie Lutz; Kelly Marie Tran – Star Wars: The Last Jedi as Rose Tico; Letitia Wright – Black Panther as Shuri	**Incredibles 2**; Adrift; Jurassic World: Fallen Kingdom; Life of the Party; Ocean's 8; Solo: A Star Wars Story
Choice Summer Movie Actor	Choice Summer Movie Actress
**Chris Pratt – Jurassic World: Fallen Kingdom as Owen Grady**; Sam Claflin – Adrift as Richard Sharp; Julian Dennison – Deadpool 2 as Russell Collins / Firefist; Alden Ehrenreich – Solo: A Star Wars Story as Han Solo; Donald Glover – Solo: A Star Wars Story as Lando Calrissian; Ryan Reynolds – Deadpool 2 as Wade Wilson / Deadpool	**Bryce Dallas Howard – Jurassic World: Fallen Kingdom as Claire Dearing**; Zazie Beetz – Deadpool 2 as Domino; Sandra Bullock – Ocean's 8 as Debbie Ocean; Emilia Clarke – Solo: A Star Wars Story as Qi'ra; Melissa McCarthy – Life of the Party as Deanna "Dee Rock" Miles; Shailene Woodley – Adrift as Tami Oldham
Choice Movie Ship
**Zac Efron & Zendaya – The Greatest Showman**; Chadwick Boseman & Lupita Nyong'o – Black Panther; Sophia Lillis & Jeremy Ray Taylor – It; Dylan O'Brien & Kaya Scodelario – Maze Runner: The Death Cure; Nick Robinson & Keiynan Lonsdale – Love, Simon; Bella Thorne & Patrick Schwarzenegger – Midnight Sun

=== Television ===
Choice Drama TV Show	Choice Drama TV Actor
**Riverdale**; Empire; Famous in Love; The Fosters; Star; This Is Us	**Cole Sprouse – Riverdale as Jughead Jones**; KJ Apa – Riverdale as Archie Andrews; Sterling K. Brown – This Is Us as Randall Pearson; Freddie Highmore – The Good Doctor as Dr. Shaun Murphy; Jussie Smollett – Empire as Jamal Lyon; Jesse Williams – Grey's Anatomy as Jackson Avery
Choice Drama TV Actress	Choice Sci-Fi/Fantasy TV Show
**Lili Reinhart – Riverdale as Betty Cooper**; Ryan Destiny – Star as Alexandra Crane; Camila Mendes – Riverdale as Veronica Lodge; Chrissy Metz – This Is Us as Kate Pearson; Maia Mitchell – The Fosters as Callie Adams-Foster; Bella Thorne – Famous in Love as Paige Townsen	**Shadowhunters**; The 100; iZombie; The Originals; Stranger Things; Supernatural
Choice Sci-Fi/Fantasy TV Actor	Choice Sci-Fi/Fantasy TV Actress
**Matthew Daddario – Shadowhunters as Alec Lightwood**; Gaten Matarazzo – Stranger Things as Dustin Henderson; Joseph Morgan – The Originals as Klaus Mikaelson; Bob Morley – The 100 as Bellamy Blake; Dominic Sherwood – Shadowhunters as Jace Herondale; Finn Wolfhard – Stranger Things as Mike Wheeler	**Millie Bobby Brown – Stranger Things as Eleven**; Rose McIver – iZombie as Olivia "Liv" Moore; Katherine McNamara – Shadowhunters as Clarissa "Clary Fray" Fairchild; Lana Parrilla – Once Upon a Time as Regina Mills / Evil Queen; Eliza Taylor – The 100 as Clarke Griffin; Emeraude Toubia – Shadowhunters as Isabelle Lightwood
Choice Action TV Show	Choice Action TV Actor
**The Flash**; Agents of S.H.I.E.L.D.; Arrow; Gotham; Lethal Weapon; Supergirl	**Grant Gustin – The Flash as Barry Allen / The Flash**; Stephen Amell – Arrow as Oliver Queen / Green Arrow; David Mazouz – Gotham as Bruce Wayne; Lucas Till – MacGyver as Angus MacGyver; Damon Wayans – Lethal Weapon as Roger Murtaugh; Chris Wood – Supergirl as Mon-El
Choice Action TV Actress	Choice Comedy TV Show
**Melissa Benoist – Supergirl as Kara Danvers / Supergirl**; Chloe Bennet – Agents of S.H.I.E.L.D. as Daisy "Skye" Johnson / Quake; Caity Lotz – Legends of Tomorrow as Sara Lance / White Canary; Danielle Panabaker – The Flash as Caitlin Snow / Killer Frost; Candice Patton – The Flash as Iris West; Emily Bett Rickards – Arrow as Felicity Smoak	**The Big Bang Theory**; Black-ish; Fuller House; The Good Place; Jane the Virgin; Modern Family
Choice Comedy TV Actor	Choice Comedy TV Actress
**Jaime Camil – Jane the Virgin as Rogelio de la Vega**; Anthony Anderson – Black-ish as Andre "Dre" Johnson Sr.; Elias Harger – Fuller House as Max Fuller; Rico Rodriguez – Modern Family as Manny Delgado; Andy Samberg – Brooklyn Nine-Nine as Detective Jake Peralta; Hudson Yang – Fresh Off the Boat as Eddie Huang	**Gina Rodriguez – Jane the Virgin as Jane Villanueva**; Kristen Bell – The Good Place as Eleanor Shellstrop; Candace Cameron Bure – Fuller House as D.J. Tanner-Fuller; America Ferrera – Superstore as Amy Dubanowski; Sarah Hyland – Modern Family as Haley Dunphy; Yara Shahidi – Black-ish & Grown-ish as Zoey Johnson
Choice Animated TV Show	Choice Reality TV Show
**Miraculous: Tales of Ladybug & Cat Noir**; Bob's Burgers; Family Guy; Rick and Morty; The Simpsons; Steven Universe	**Keeping Up with the Kardashians**; The Four: Battle for Stardom; Lip Sync Battle; MasterChef Junior; Total Divas; The Voice
Choice Throwback TV Show	Choice TV Personality
**Friends**; Dawson's Creek; The Fresh Prince of Bel-Air; Gossip Girl; One Tree Hill; That '70s Show	**Chrissy Teigen – Lip Sync Battle**; Hailey Baldwin – Drop the Mic; Kelly Clarkson – The Voice; Derek Hough – World of Dance; DJ Khaled – The Four: Battle for Stardom; Meghan Trainor – The Four: Battle for Stardom
Choice TV Villain	Choice Breakout TV Show
**Mark Consuelos – Riverdale as Hiram Lodge**; Odette Annable – Supergirl as Samantha Arias / Reign; Gabrielle Anwar – Once Upon a Time as Rapunzel Tremaine; Anna Hopkins – Shadowhunters as Lilith; Mind Flayer – Stranger Things; Cameron Monaghan – Gotham as Jerome Valeska / Jeremiah Valeska	**On My Block**; 9-1-1; Anne with an E; Black Lightning; The Resident; Siren
Choice Breakout TV Star	Choice Summer TV Show
**Vanessa Morgan – Riverdale as Toni Topaz**; Iain Armitage – Young Sheldon as Sheldon Cooper; Lyric Ross – This Is Us as Deja; Luka Sabbat – Grown-ish as Luca Hall; Oliver Stark – 9-1-1 as Evan "Buck" Buckley; Nafessa Williams – Black Lightning as Anissa Pierce / Thunder	**So You Think You Can Dance**; Beat Shazam; The Bold Type; Cloak & Dagger; Cobra Kai; Total Bellas
Choice Summer TV Star	Choice TV Ship
**Olivia Holt – Cloak & Dagger as Tandy Bowen / Dagger**; Aisha Dee – The Bold Type as Kat Edison; Meghann Fahy – The Bold Type as Sutton Brady; Aubrey Joseph – Cloak & Dagger as Tyrone Johnson / Cloak; Xolo Maridueña – Cobra Kai as Miguel Diaz; Katie Stevens – The Bold Type as Jane Sloan	**Cole Sprouse & Lili Reinhart – Riverdale**; Stephen Amell & Emily Bett Rickards – Arrow; KJ Apa & Camila Mendes – Riverdale; Millie Bobby Brown & Finn Wolfhard – Stranger Things; Matthew Daddario & Harry Shum Jr. – Shadowhunters; Grant Gustin & Candice Patton – The Flash

=== Movies and television ===
Choice Scene Stealer	Choice Liplock
**Vanessa Morgan – Riverdale as Toni Topaz**; Charlie Heaton – Stranger Things as Jonathan Byers; Tom Hiddleston – Thor: Ragnarok as Loki; Nick Jonas – Jumanji: Welcome to the Jungle as Jefferson "Seaplane" McDonough; Katie McGrath – Supergirl as Lena Luthor; Taika Waititi – Thor: Ragnarok as Korg	**Cole Sprouse & Lili Reinhart – Riverdale**; Chadwick Boseman & Lupita Nyong'o – Black Panther; Millie Bobby Brown & Finn Wolfhard – Stranger Things; Zac Efron & Zendaya – The Greatest Showman; Chris Pratt & Zoe Saldaña – Avengers: Infinity War; Gina Rodriguez & Justin Baldoni – Jane the Virgin
Choice Hissy Fit	Choice Fight
**Madelaine Petsch – Riverdale**; Jack Black – Jumanji: Welcome to the Jungle; Adam Driver – Star Wars: The Last Jedi; Kevin Hart – Jumanji: Welcome to the Jungle; Joe Keery – Stranger Things; Mark Ruffalo – Avengers: Infinity War	**Chadwick Boseman vs. Michael B. Jordan** – Black Panther; Jeremy Renner vs. Ed Helms, Jon Hamm, Jake Johnson & Hannibal Buress – Tag; Carolina vs. Tex – Red vs. Blue; Ryan Reynolds vs. Josh Brolin – Deadpool 2; Daisy Ridley, Adam Driver vs. Elite Praetorian Guard – Star Wars: The Last Jedi; Colin Firth and Taron Egerton vs. Pedro Pascal – Kingsman: The Golden Circle

=== Music ===
Choice Male Artist	Choice Female Artist
**Louis Tomlinson**; Drake; Niall Horan; Bruno Mars; Shawn Mendes; Ed Sheeran	**Camila Cabello**; Taylor Swift; Cardi B; Ariana Grande; Dua Lipa; Demi Lovato
Choice Music Group	Choice Country Artist
**5 Seconds of Summer**; Fifth Harmony; Florida Georgia Line; Maroon 5; Migos; Why Don't We	**Carrie Underwood**; Kelsea Ballerini; Kane Brown; Maren Morris; Thomas Rhett; Blake Shelton
Choice Electronic/Dance Artist	Choice Latin Artist
**The Chainsmokers**; Steve Aoki; Martin Garrix; Calvin Harris; Marshmello; Zedd	**CNCO**; J Balvin; Daddy Yankee; Luis Fonsi; Becky G; Maluma
Choice R&B/Hip-Hop Artist	Choice Rock Artist
**Cardi B**; Childish Gambino; Drake; Khalid; Nicki Minaj; Post Malone	**Imagine Dragons**; Panic! at the Disco; Paramore; Portugal. The Man; Twenty One Pilots; X Ambassadors
Choice Breakout Artist	Choice Next Big Thing
**Khalid**; Bazzi; Lauv; Logic; Marshmello; SZA	**Jackson Wang**; Blackpink; MattyBRaps; NCT; Jacob Sartorius; Stray Kids
Choice International Artist	Choice Song: Male Artist
**BTS**; Blackpink; CNCO; Exo; Got7; Super Junior	**"Perfect" – Ed Sheeran**; "Attention" – Charlie Puth; "God's Plan" – Drake; "LOVE." – Kendrick Lamar feat. Zacari; "Say Something" – Justin Timberlake feat. Chris Stapleton; "This Is America" – Childish Gambino
Choice Song: Female Artist	Choice Song: Group
**"Havana" – Camila Cabello feat. Young Thug**; "Bad at Love" – Halsey; "Look What You Made Me Do" – Taylor Swift; "New Rules" – Dua Lipa; "No Tears Left to Cry" – Ariana Grande; "Sorry Not Sorry" – Demi Lovato	**"Youngblood" – 5 Seconds of Summer**; "Feel It Still" – Portugal. The Man; "Say Amen (Saturday Night)" – Panic! at the Disco; "Trust Fund Baby" – Why Don't We; "Wait" – Maroon 5; "Whatever It Takes" – Imagine Dragons
Choice Collaboration	Choice Pop Song
**"Rewrite the Stars" – Zac Efron & Zendaya**; "End Game" – Taylor Swift feat. Ed Sheeran & Future; "Finesse (Remix)" – Bruno Mars feat. Cardi B; "Meant to Be" – Bebe Rexha feat. Florida Georgia Line; "The Middle" – Zedd, Maren Morris, & Grey; "Pray for Me" – The Weeknd & Kendrick Lamar	**"In My Blood" – Shawn Mendes**; "Delicate" – Taylor Swift; "Don't Go Breaking My Heart" – Backstreet Boys; "No Excuses" – Meghan Trainor; "No Tears Left to Cry" – Ariana Grande; "This Is Me" – Keala Settle
Choice Country Song	Choice Electronic/Dance Song
**"Meant to Be" – Bebe Rexha feat. Florida Georgia Line**; "Cry Pretty" – Carrie Underwood; "Heaven" – Kane Brown; "Life Changes" – Thomas Rhett; "Mercy" – Brett Young; "Most People Are Good" – Luke Bryan	**"All Night" – Steve Aoki & Lauren Jauregui**; "Friends" – Marshmello & Anne-Marie; "The Middle" – Zedd, Maren Morris, & Grey; "One Kiss" – Calvin Harris & Dua Lipa; "Perfect" – Topic & Ally Brooke; "Solo" – Clean Bandit feat. Demi Lovato
Choice Latin Song	Choice R&B/Hip-Hop Song
**"Familiar" – Liam Payne & J Balvin**; "Boom Boom" – RedOne, Daddy Yankee, French Montana & Dinah Jane; "Dinero" – Jennifer Lopez feat. DJ Khaled & Cardi B; "Hey DJ" – CNCO; "Mi Gente" – J Balvin & Willy William; "Échame la Culpa" – Luis Fonsi & Demi Lovato	**"Love Lies" – Khalid & Normani**; "All the Stars" – Kendrick Lamar & SZA; "Finesse (Remix)" – Bruno Mars feat. Cardi B; "God's Plan" – Drake; "Let You Down" – NF; "This Is America" – Childish Gambino
Choice Rock/Alternative Song	Choice Summer Song
**"Whatever It Takes" – Imagine Dragons**; "Alone" – Halsey; "Hard Times" – Paramore; "High Hopes" – Panic! at the Disco; "No Roots" – Alice Merton; "Sit Next to Me" – Foster the People	**"Back to You" – Selena Gomez**; "Familiar" – Liam Payne & J Balvin; "Girls Like You" – Maroon 5 feat. Cardi B; "Nice for What" – Drake; "One Kiss" – Calvin Harris & Dua Lipa; "Youngblood" – 5 Seconds of Summer
Choice Summer Female Artist	Choice Summer Male Artist
**Camila Cabello**; Cardi B; Selena Gomez; Ariana Grande; Halsey; Meghan Trainor	**Shawn Mendes**; Kane Brown; Niall Horan; Liam Payne; Charlie Puth; Zayn
Choice Summer Group	Choice Choice Summer Tour
**5 Seconds of Summer**; The Chainsmokers; Dan + Shay; Imagine Dragons; Maroon 5; Panic! at the Disco	**Harry Styles – Harry Styles: Live on Tour**; Niall Horan – Flicker World Tour; Jay Z & Beyoncé – On the Run II Tour; Charlie Puth – Voicenotes Tour; Taylor Swift – Reputation Stadium Tour; Top Dawg Entertainment – The Championship Tour

=== Digital ===
Choice Female Web Star	Choice Male Web Star
**Liza Koshy**; Eva Gutowski; Merrell Twins; Bethany Mota; Lele Pons; Lilly Singh	**The Dolan Twins**; Cameron Dallas; Joey Graceffa; Ryan Higa; Collins Key; Tyler Oakley
Choice Comedy Web Star	Choice Music Web Star
**Liza Koshy**; The Dolan Twins; Collins Key; Miranda Sings; Lele Pons; Lilly Singh	**Erika Costell**; Anitta; Chloe x Halle; Jack & Jack; Johnny Orlando; Noah Schnacky
Choice Fashion/Beauty Web Star	Choice Twit
**James Charles**; Dulce Candy; Kandee Johnson; Shay Mitchell; NikkieTutorials; Zoella	**Anna Kendrick**; Mark Hamill; Mindy Kaling; Kumail Nanjiani; Ryan Reynolds; Chrissy Teigen
Choice Instagrammer	Choice Snapchatter
**Selena Gomez**; Lucy Hale; Dwayne Johnson; John Mayer; Will Smith; Justin Timberlake	**Ariana Grande**; Ethan Dolan; Grayson Dolan; Kendall Jenner; Demi Lovato; Meghan Trainor
Choice YouTuber	Choice Muser
**Liza Koshy**; DanTDM; The Dolan Twins; Merrell Twins; Lele Pons; Lilly Singh	**Mackenzie Ziegler**; Baby Ariel; Loren Gray; Holly H; Sofia Santino; Valentina Schulz

=== Fashion ===
Choice Style Icon	Choice Female Hottie
**Harry Styles**; Chadwick Boseman; Blake Lively; Meghan, Duchess of Sussex; Migos; Zendaya	**Lauren Jauregui**; Hailey Baldwin; Selena Gomez; Olivia Holt; Kendall Jenner; Yara Shahidi
Choice Male Hottie
**Cole Sprouse**; Chadwick Boseman; Zac Efron; Grant Gustin; Chris Hemsworth; Shawn Mendes

=== Sports ===
Choice Male Athlete	Choice Female Athlete
**LeBron James**; Stephen Curry; Red Gerard; Adam Rippon; J. J. Watt; Shaun White	**Serena Williams**; Chloe Kim; Mirai Nagasu; Mikaela Shiffrin; U.S. Olympic Women's Ice Hockey Team; Lindsey Vonn

=== Miscellaneous ===
Choice Comedian	Choice Dancer
**The Dolan Twins**; James Corden; Ellen DeGeneres; Jimmy Fallon; Kevin Hart; Lilly Singh	**Maddie Ziegler**; Cheryl Burke; Jenna Dewan; Derek Hough; Les Twins; tWitch
Choice Video Game	Choice Model
**Fortnite**; Fire Emblem Heroes; The Legend of Zelda: Breath of the Wild; Overwatch; PlayerUnknown's Battlegrounds; Super Mario Odyssey	**Gigi Hadid**; Adwoa Aboah; Romeo Beckham; Kaia Gerber; Bella Hadid; Jaden Smith
Choice Fandom
**BTS – BTS Army**; Blackpink – Blinks; CNCO – CNCOwners; One Direction – Directioners; Fifth Harmony – Harmonizers; Taylor Swift – Swifties
