= Regulations protecting consumers from microtransactions =

Consumer protection laws

The following is a list of laws providing an overview of laws and regulations that aim to protect consumers from microtransactions.

== Regulations in the United States ==
The Federal Trade Commission Act (FTC Act): The FTC Act prohibits companies from engaging in unfair or deceptive practices, including those related to in-app purchases. These practices include failing to clearly disclose the costs of purchases, making it difficult for consumers to cancel purchases, and encouraging mass spending.

In recent years, the FTC has taken action against video game companies that engage in deceptive or unfair practices related to in-app purchases. For example, in 2014, the FTC settled with Apple over allegations that the company allowed children to make unauthorized in-app purchases without their parents' consent. As part of the settlement, Apple agreed to refund a minimum of $32.5 million to affected consumers that were billed for in-app purchases incurred by children. Apple was also required to modify its in-app purchase practices to ensure that users have a clear understanding of the costs associated with in-app purchases. Similarly, in 2019, the FTC settled with video game publisher, Epic Games, over allegations that the company misled consumers about the cost of in-app purchases in addition to using dark patterns that encourage unintended in-game purchases in its popular game, Fortnite. As part of the settlement, Epic Games agreed to pay $275 million in refunds to consumers and to modify its in-game purchasing practices to ensure that consumers have clear information about the costs of in-app purchases.

The Children's Online Privacy Protection Act (COPPA) regulates the collection of personal information from children under the age of 13 by online services, including video games. COPPA requires companies to obtain parental consent before collecting information from children, which includes information used to make online in-app purchases.

The Better Business Bureau's National Advertising Division (NAD): The NAD is a self-regulatory body that plays a role in protecting children from potentially deceptive and unfair practices related to microtransactions by reviewing advertisement claims for truthfulness and accuracy. The NAD has issued guidelines for video game companies that use in-app purchases, including requirements for clear and conspicuous disclosures of costs and the nature of the purchase. The guidelines also require video game companies to avoid misleading advertisements, such as baiting consumers into believing the benefits of in-app purchases or failing to disclose additional costs associated with the purchases.

== Regulations in Asia ==
=== Regulations in China ===
The Chinese Consumer Protection Law regulates consumer protection in China and places extremely strict guidelines, including those related to in-app purchases. The law requires companies to provide clear and accurate information about the cost and nature of in-app purchases. In 2016, all games published in China are required to go through a licensing and approval process through the National Press and Publication Administration (NPPA). The NPPA is extremely strict with loot boxes due to the similarities shared with gambling. Below is a list of restrictions enforced by the NPPA.

1. The contents within a loot box must be obtainable through other in-game means
2. Activities that encourage compulsion loops are not allowed
3. Game developers must disclose the percentage probability of obtaining an item from a loot box. These percentages must reflect reality. For example, an item with a 10% chance of dropping must drop within opening 10 loot boxes. This guarantees that a player would receive an item after opening a certain amount of loot boxes.
4. A strict limit on how many loot boxes a player can open each day, with a clear in-game display notifying the player of that quantity.

Additionally, in 2019, the Chinese government implemented regulations that limits the amount of money players can spend on in-game purchases. The maximum amount ranged from $28 to $57 depending on age.

=== Regulations in Japan ===
The Consumer Affairs Agency (CAA) has issued several self-regulatory measures to address several points of criticism in regards to in-game purchases in the form of gatcha mechanics. These regulations include the following.

1. In order to address transparency concerns, game developers must disclose the probability of obtaining an item through gatcha mechanics.
2. Game developers must have measures in place to prevent real money trading (e.g. in secondary markets).
3. The prohibition of kompu gacha-like mechanics.
4. The establishment of a regulatory committee in order to create more detailed guidelines and raise public awareness.

The Act against Unjustifiable Premiums and Misleading Representations regulates false advertising and misleading representations in Japan. Under this act, video game companies are prohibited from making false or misleading statements about the benefits of in-game purchases or gatcha mechanics.

The Payment Services Act regulates electronic payment services in Japan, including those used for in-app purchases. Under this act, payment service providers must obtain a license from the government and are required to comply with various regulations to ensure the security of consumer information and transactions.

=== Regulations in South Korea ===
The Game Industry Promotion Act is a law that aims to promote the development of the video game industry while also protecting consumers from being manipulated. Under this act, the South Korean government has the power to conduct regular inspections on companies to ensure compliance. An amendment in the Game Industry Promotion Act now requires companies to disclose all probabilities in a loot box on all platforms, including the game, advertisements for the game, and the game's official website.

=== Regulations in Taiwan ===
In 2022, the Consumer Protection Committee (CPC) reviewed and approved an amendment that created a set of guidelines in order to protect consumers from in-game purchases. These guidelines require game companies to disclose the draw probability of loot box rewards in order to affect consumers' transaction decisions. In order to present complete transparency, this amendment requires companies to disclose all odds as a percentage. In addition, the Department of Consumer Protection (DCP) has made an effort to raise awareness on in-game purchases, and advises consumers that buying loot boxes or purchasing in-game event will not guarantee specific rewards. The DCP also encourages consumers to read the drop rate information carefully to avoid excessive spending or impulse buying only to receive nothing in return.

== Regulations in the EU ==
The General Data Protection Regulation (GDPR) is a comprehensive data protection law that applies to all businesses operating in the European Union (EU). Although the GDPR is not specifically focused on regulating microtransactions or in-game purchases, it regulates the collection and use of personal data. Under the GDPR, video game companies are required to obtain explicit consent from users before collecting and using their information. This information includes but is not limited to payment information, personal information, or purchase history used for in-game. Video game companies must also inform consumers on how their information will be used, and must allow consumers to withdraw their consent at any time. The GDPR also gives consumers the right to access, rectify, and erase data collected on them. At any time, consumers can request video game companies to correct or delete information on them if that information is inaccurate.

The Consumer Rights Directive is a law that sets out a range of consumer protections related to online transactions. The directive provides the following protections for consumers in Europe.

1. Clear and Transparent Information: Video game companies must provide clear and transparent information about the cost and nature of in-game purchases, including any recurring charges or subscriptions. This information must be provided in a way that is easy for consumers to access and understand.
2. Explicit Consent: Before processing a transaction for an in-game purchase, video game companies must obtain explicit consent from consumers. This means that consumers must actively confirm that they want to make the purchase, rather than simply having the purchase added to their account automatically.
3. Right of Withdrawal: Consumers have the right to cancel or withdraw from a purchase within 14 days of making it. This gives consumers the opportunity to review their purchase and protect them from impulsive decisions. It also gives consumers a chance to decide if the purchase is something they really want or need.
4. Refund Rights: If a consumer cancels a purchase or withdraws from it, they are entitled to a refund. Video game companies must process these refunds promptly and without undue delay.
