= Teen Choice Award for Choice Music Group =

Music award category

The following is a list of Teen Choice Award winners and nominees for Choice Music – Group. The award was not given from 2002 to 2009. One Direction receives the most wins with 4.

== Winners and nominees ==
=== 1999 ===
Year	Winner	Nominees	Ref.
1999	TLC	98 Degrees; Aerosmith; Backstreet Boys; Goo Goo Dolls; *NSYNC; Smash Mouth; TRU	

=== 2000s ===
Year	Winner	Nominees	Ref.
2000	*NSYNC	702; 98 Degrees; Backstreet Boys; Destiny's Child; LFO; Savage Garden; TLC	
2001	Destiny's Child	3LW; 98 Degrees; Backstreet Boys; Dream; Eden's Crush; *NSYNC; O-Town	

=== 2010s ===
Year	Winner	Nominees	Ref.
2010	Selena Gomez & the Scene	Black Eyed Peas; Glee Cast; New Boyz; Young Money	
2011	Selena Gomez & the Scene	Black Eyed Peas; Far East Movement; Glee Cast	
2012	Selena Gomez & the Scene	Gym Class Heroes; Lady Antebellum; LMFAO; The Wanted	
2013	One Direction	Big Time Rush; fun.; Maroon 5; The Wanted	
2014	One Direction	5 Seconds of Summer; Fifth Harmony; R5; Rixton	
2015	One Direction	5 Seconds of Summer; Fall Out Boy; Imagine Dragons; Maroon 5; OneRepublic	
2015	Fifth Harmony	Barden Bellas; Cimorelli; Haim; Icona Pop; Little Mix	
2016	One Direction	5 Seconds of Summer; The Chainsmokers; DNCE; Fall Out Boy; Fifth Harmony	
2017	Fifth Harmony	The Chainsmokers; Little Mix; Maroon 5; Twenty One Pilots; The Vamps	
2018	5 Seconds of Summer	Fifth Harmony; Florida Georgia Line; Maroon 5; Migos; Why Don't We	
2019	Why Don't We	5 Seconds of Summer; The Chainsmokers; Jonas Brothers; Panic! at the Disco; PrettyMuch	
