= Teen Choice Award for Choice Summer Music Star: Group =

Entertainment award category

The following is a list of Teen Choice Award winners and nominees for Choice Summer Music Star: Group. It was first introduced in 2012. 5 Seconds of Summer receives the most wins with 3.

== Winners and nominees ==
| Year | Winner | Nominees | Ref. |
|---|---|---|---|
| 2012 | One Direction | Coldplay; Gym Class Heroes; Maroon 5; The Wanted | |
| 2013 | Maroon 5 | Daft Punk; Florida Georgia Line; Imagine Dragons; Macklemore & Ryan Lewis | |
| 2014 | 5 Seconds of Summer | Fifth Harmony; Florida Georgia Line; Magic!; Rixton | |
| 2015 | One Direction | 5 Seconds of Summer; Echosmith; Fifth Harmony; Little Mix; Maroon 5 | |
| 2016 | 5 Seconds of Summer | The 1975; The Chainsmokers; DNCE; Fifth Harmony; OneRepublic | |
| 2017 | Fifth Harmony | The Chainsmokers; Coldplay; Florida Georgia Line; Imagine Dragons; Little Mix | |
| 2018 | 5 Seconds of Summer | Dan + Shay; Imagine Dragons; Maroon 5; Panic! at the Disco; The Chainsmokers | |
