= 7th Streamy Awards =

2017 awards ceremony recognizing online video

7th Annual Streamy Awards
- Date: September 26, 2017
- Location: The Beverly Hilton; Beverly Hills, California
- Presented by: Streamys Blue Ribbon Panel
- Hosted by: Jon Cozart

Highlights
- Most awards: Casey Neistat and DeStorm Power (2)
- Most nominations: Casey Neistat (6)
- Audience Choice: Sugar Pine 7 (Show of the Year); The Dolan Twins (Creator of the Year)

Television/radio coverage
- Network: Twitter
- Produced by: Dick Clark Productions; Tubefilter

The 7th Annual Streamy Awards was the seventh installment of the Streamy Awards honoring the best in American streaming television series and their creators. The awards were broadcast live from Twitter on September 26, 2017 from The Beverly Hilton in Beverly Hills, California. They were hosted by YouTube star Jon Cozart. Awards for Best Comedy Series and Best Drama Series were introduced for the 2017 Streamys to put a greater emphasis on original series, and the performance awards were not split by gender as they had been in previous years in an effort to make the awards more inclusive. The 2017 Streamys also featured a shift towards independent content creators.

The 1st annual Purpose Awards @ the Streamys were announced on August 16 and presented at a separate event hosted by Burnie Burns and Ashley Jenkins at the Conga Room in L.A. Live on September 25.

== Performers ==
The 7th Annual Streamy Awards featured the first live performance in over 30 years from American disco group Village People. They ended the show with a medley of their most popular songs.

Performers at the 7th Streamy Awards
Artist(s)	Song(s)
Village People	"Y.M.C.A." "Macho Man"

== Winners and nominees ==
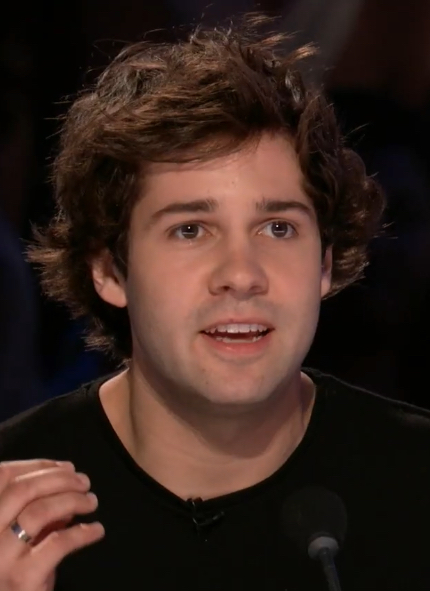
David Dobrik, winner of the Breakout Creator award

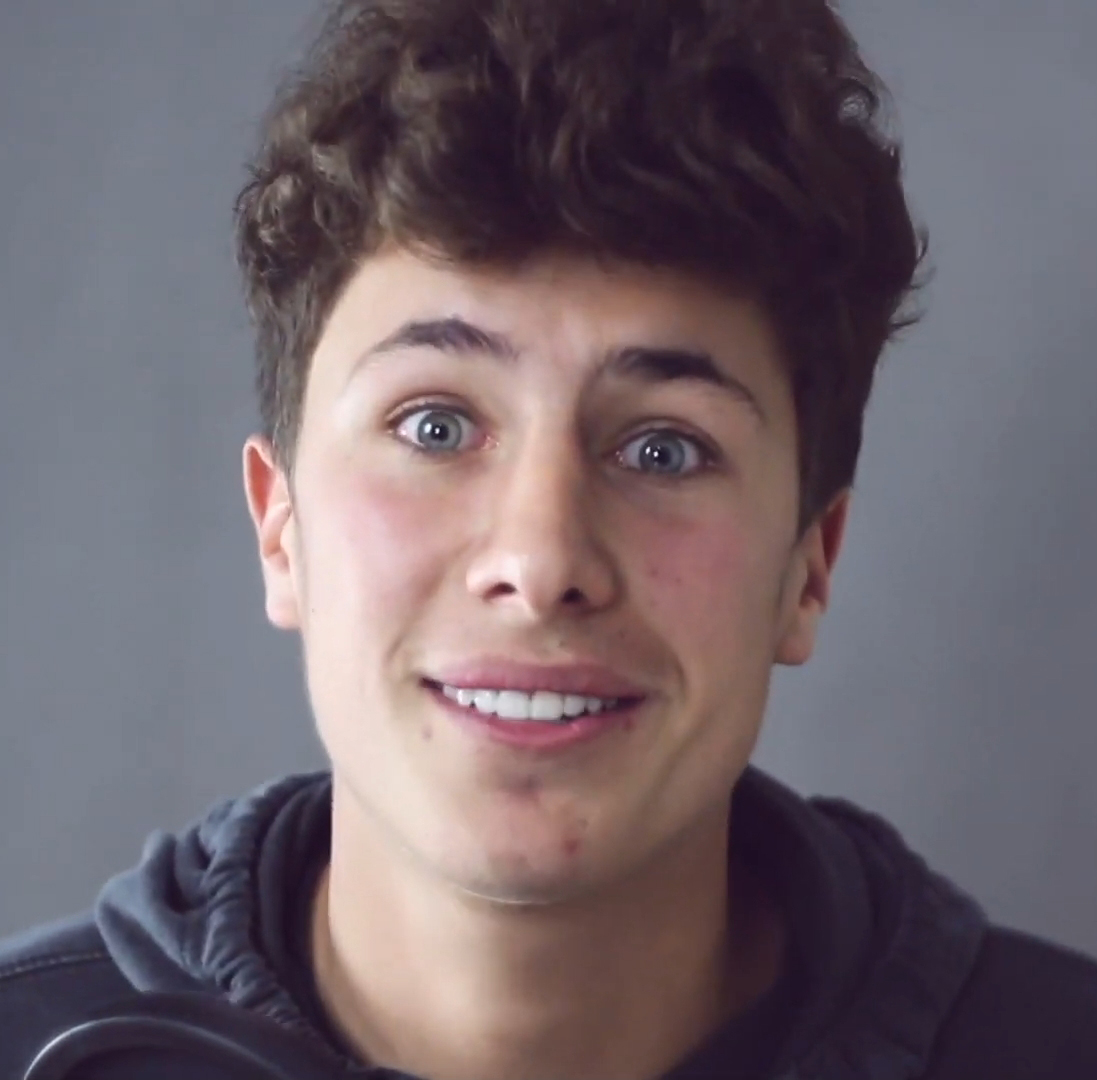
Juanpa Zurita, winner of the International category

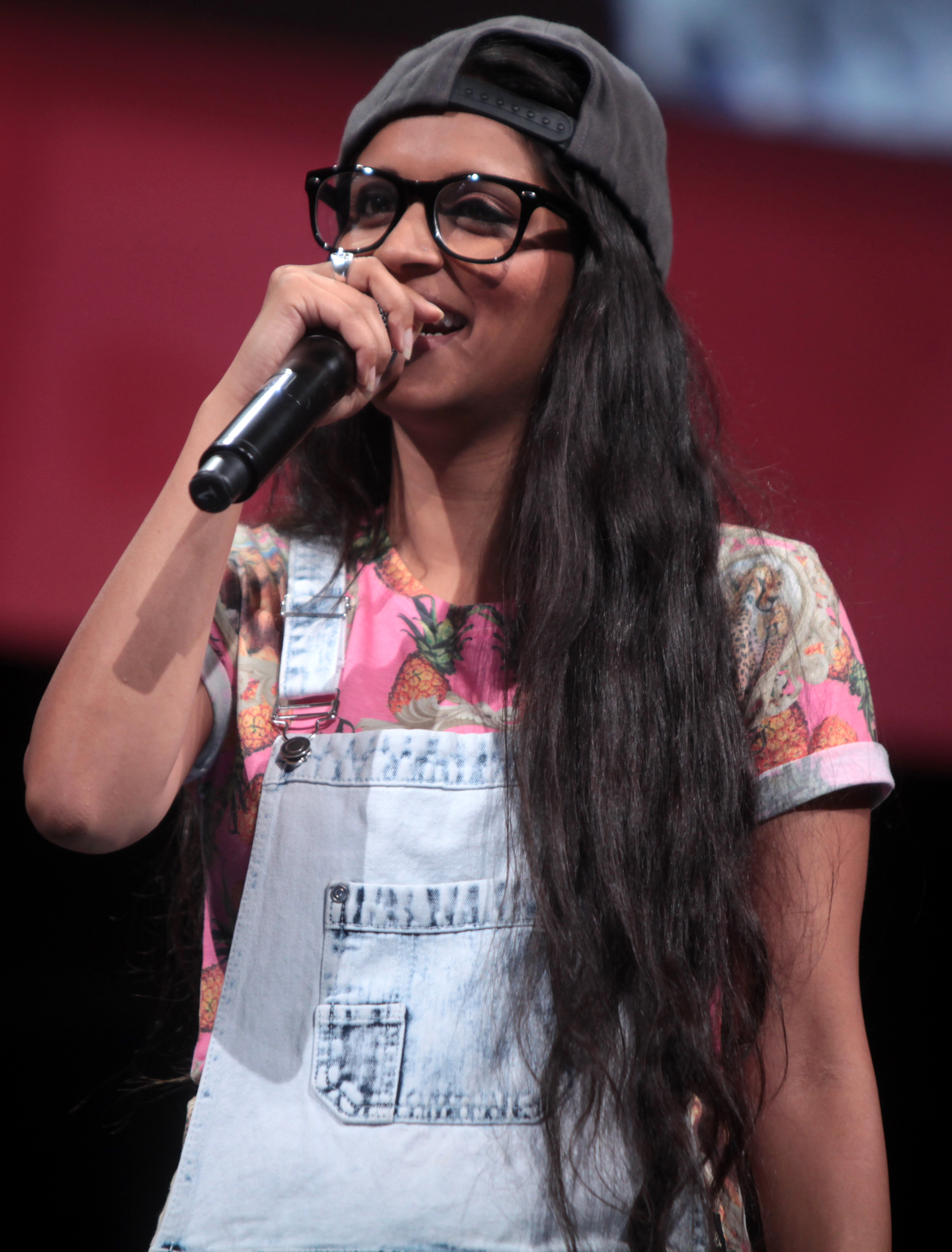
Lilly Singh, winner of the First Person category and Purpose Award honoree

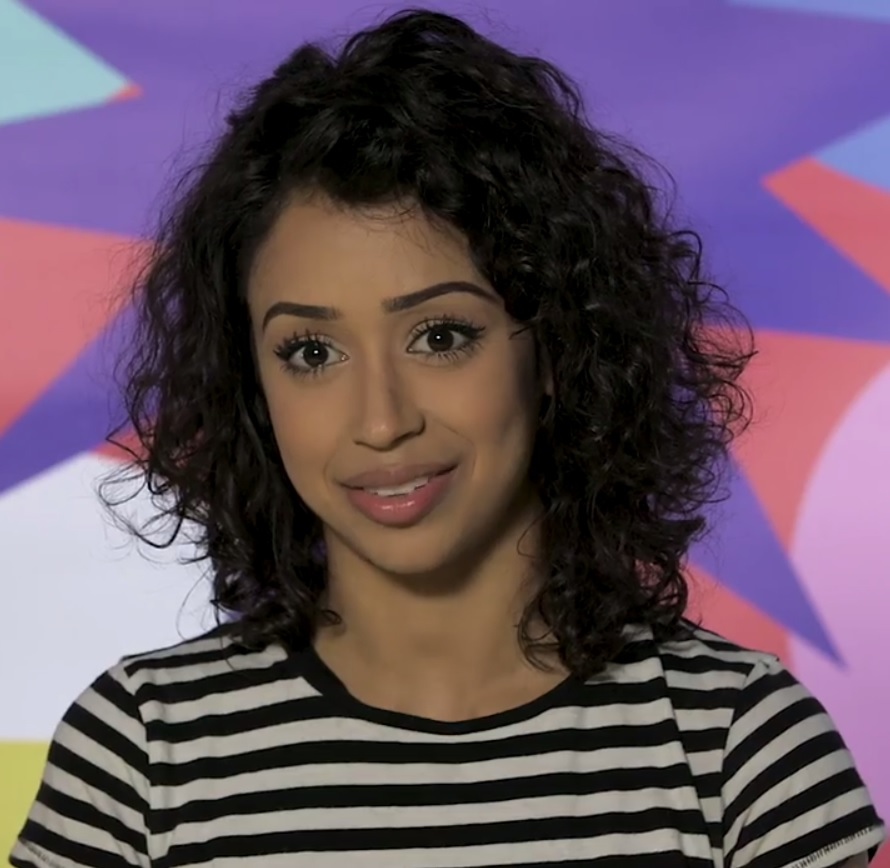
Liza Koshy, winner of the Comedy category

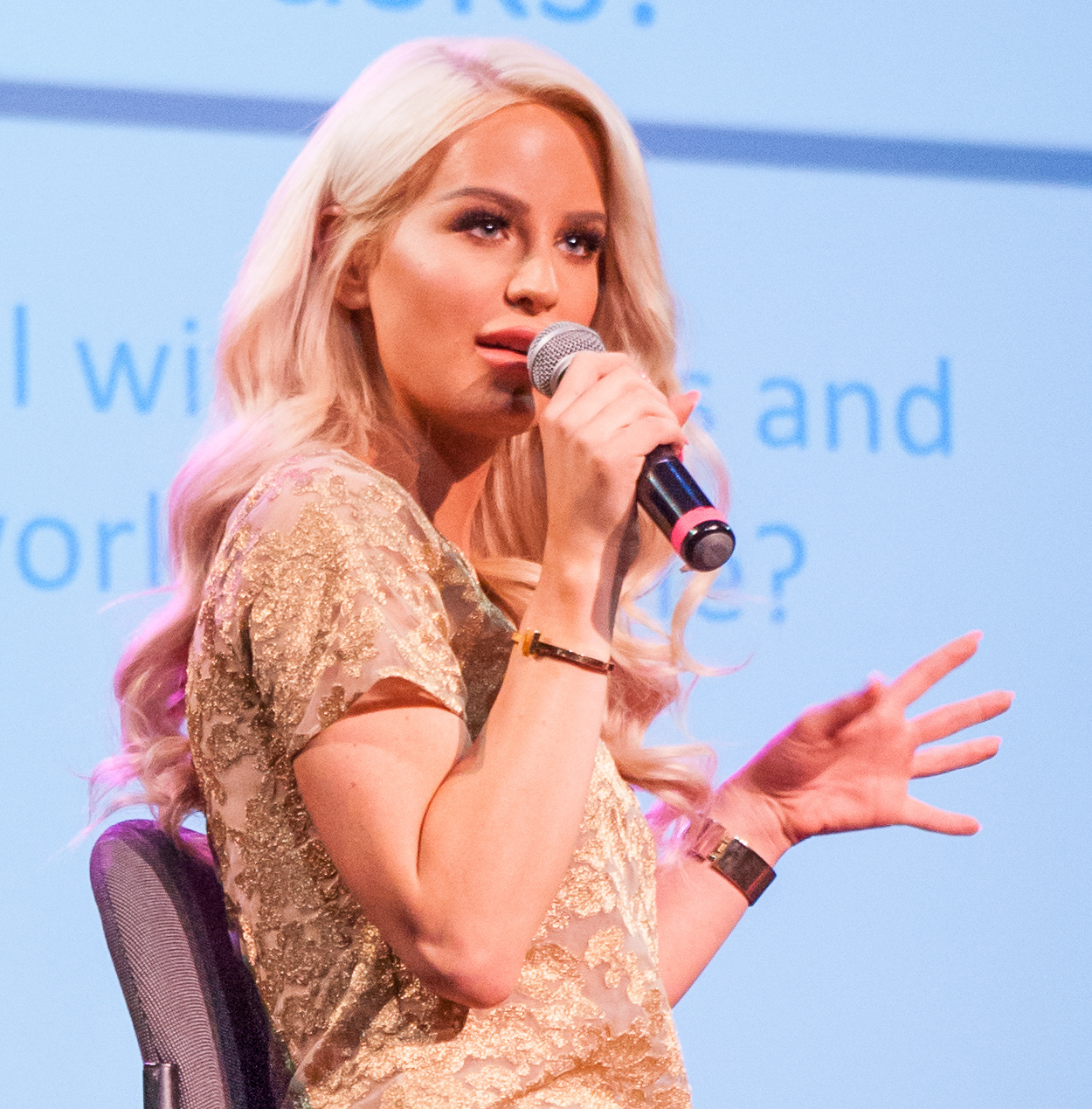
Gigi Gorgeous, winner of Best Feature

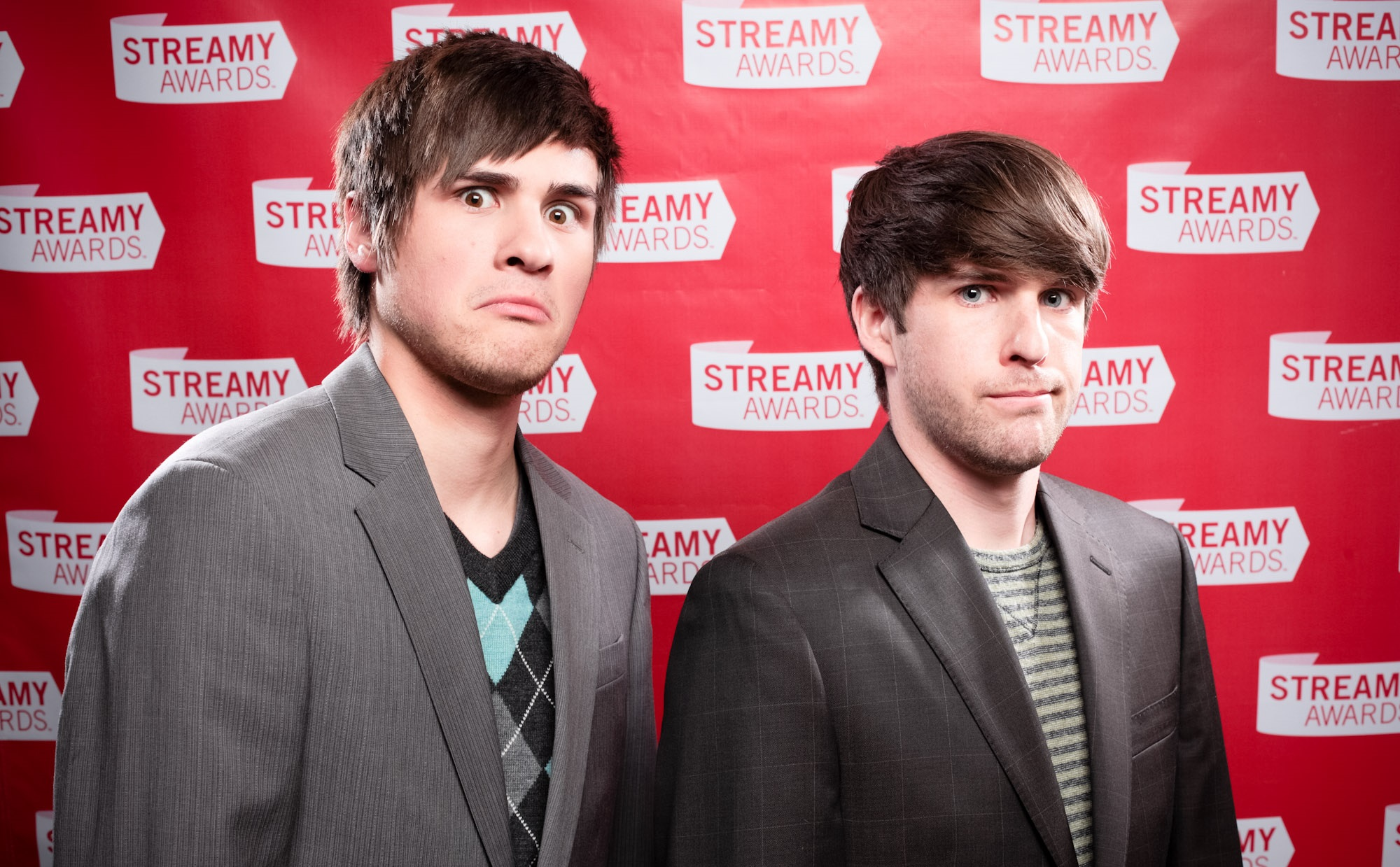
Smosh, winners of the Live and Gaming categories

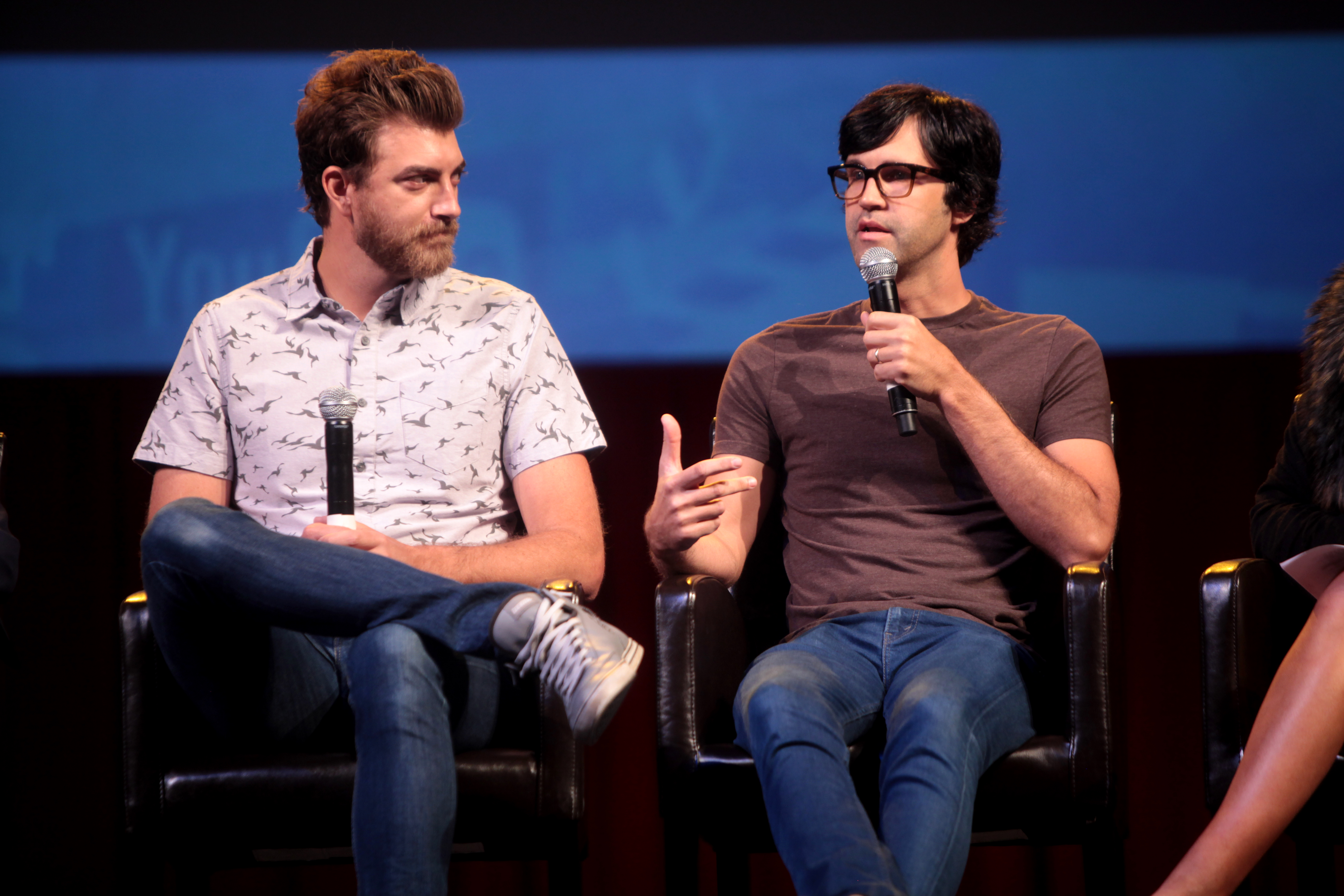
Rhett & Link, winners of Best Comedy Series

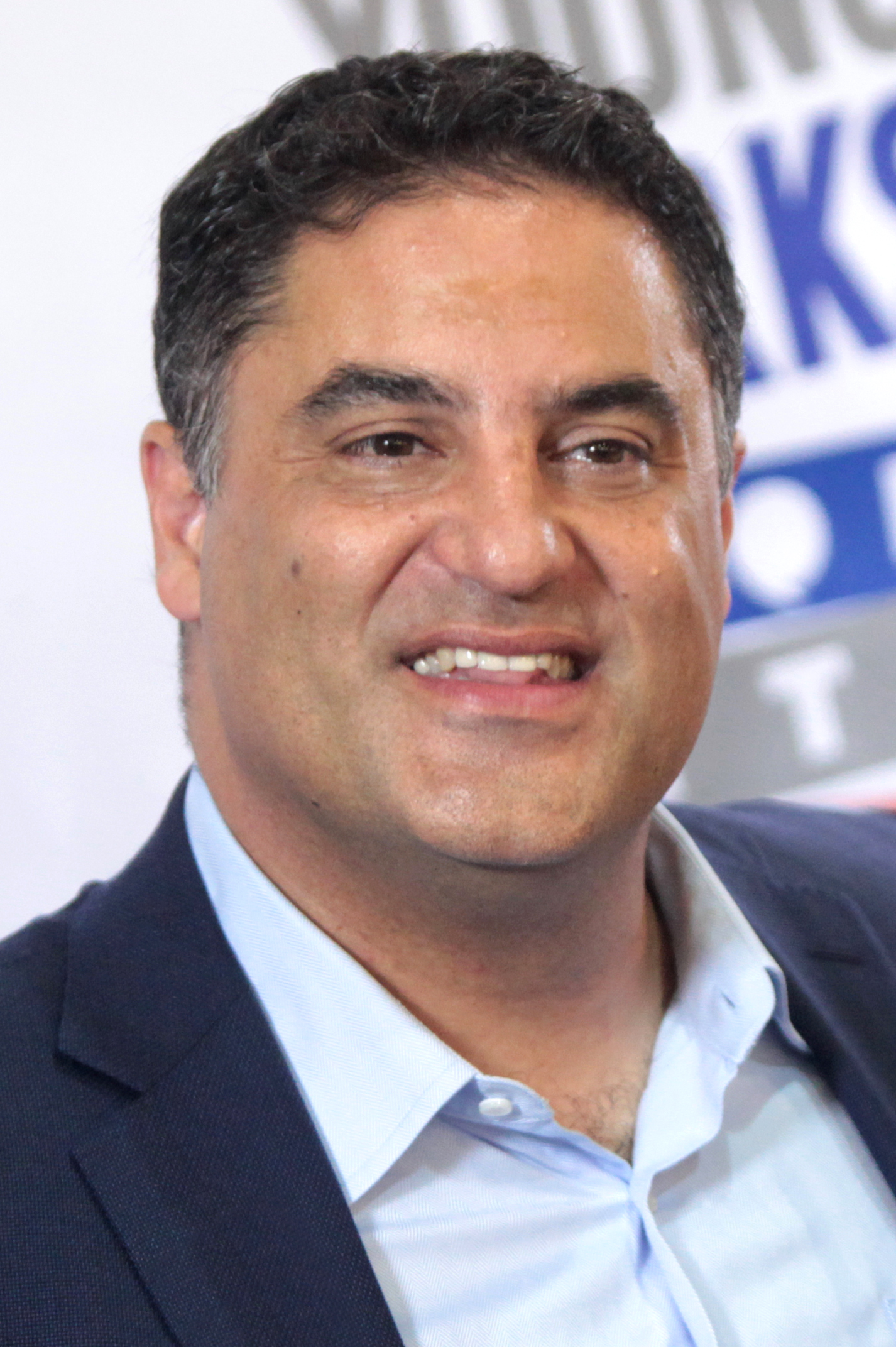
Cenk Uygur of The Young Turks, winner of the News and Culture category

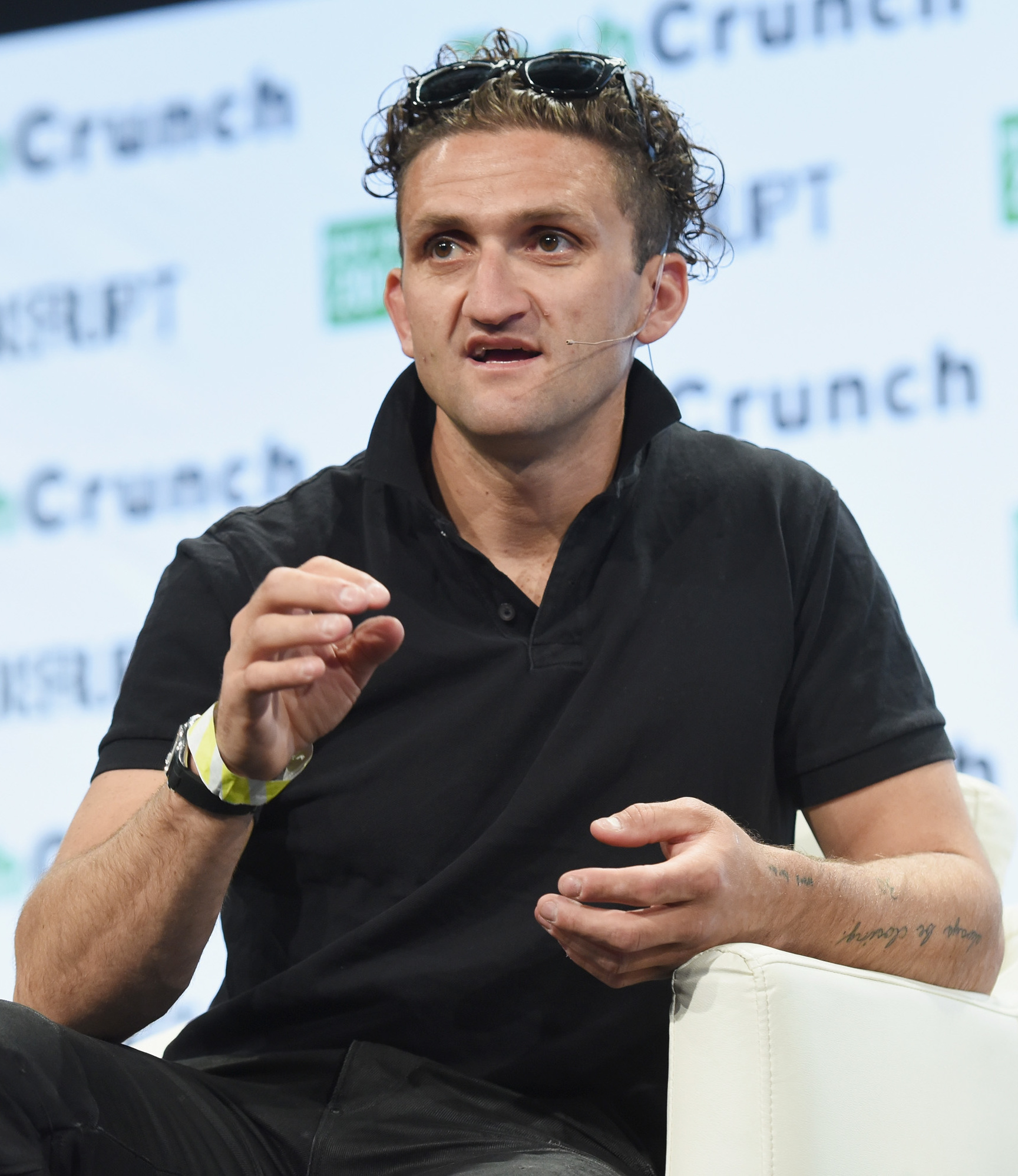
Casey Neistat, winner of Best Cinematography and Best Influencer Campaign

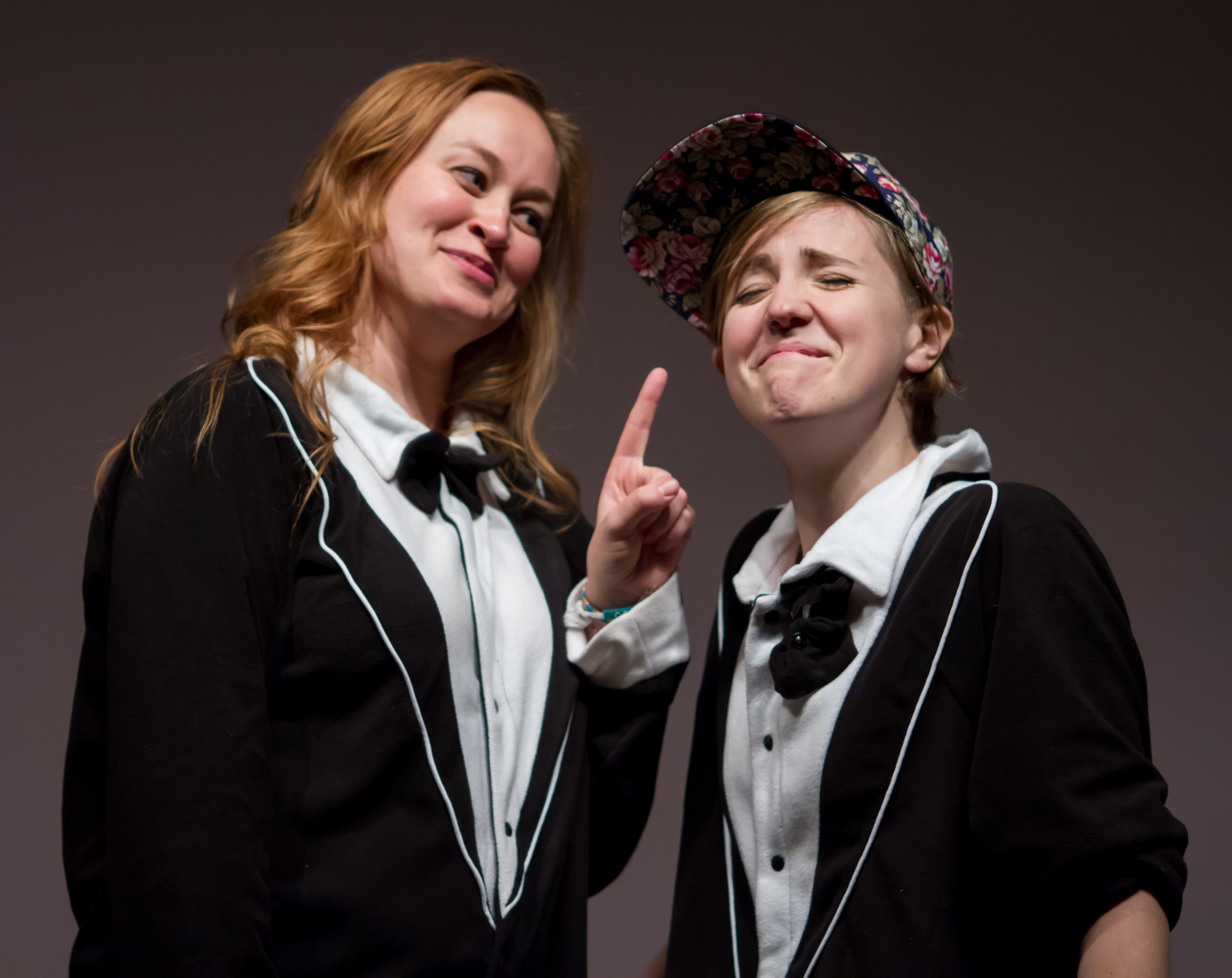
Mamrie Hart (left), winner of Best Acting in a Drama, with Hannah Hart, Purpose Award honoree

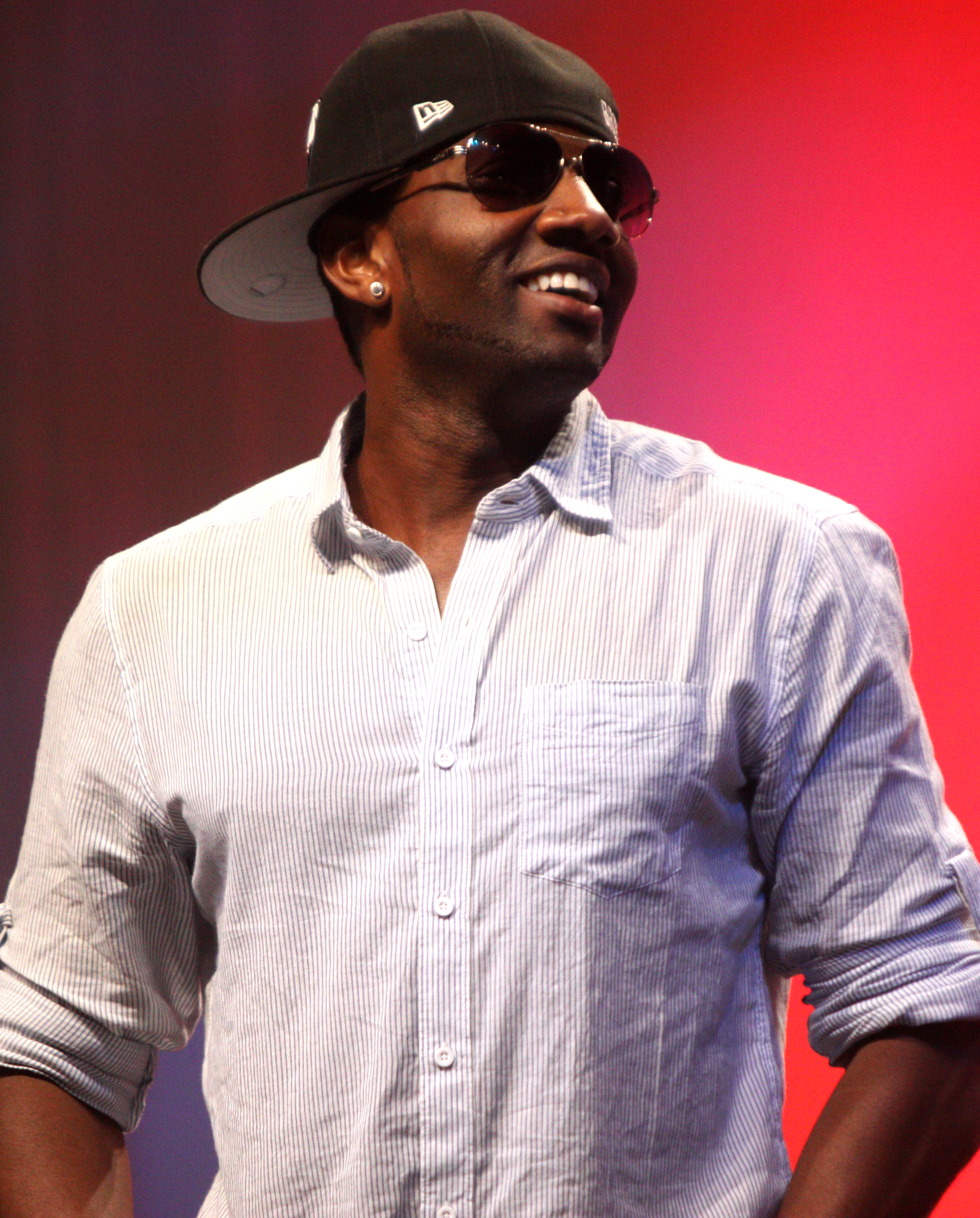
DeStorm Power, winner of Best Acting in a Drama and the Writing Craft Award

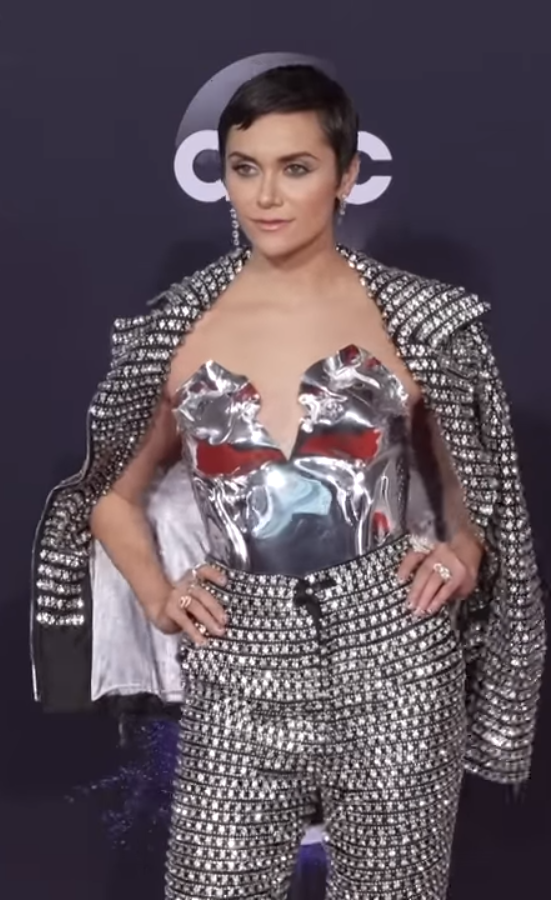
Alyson Stoner, winner of the Dance category

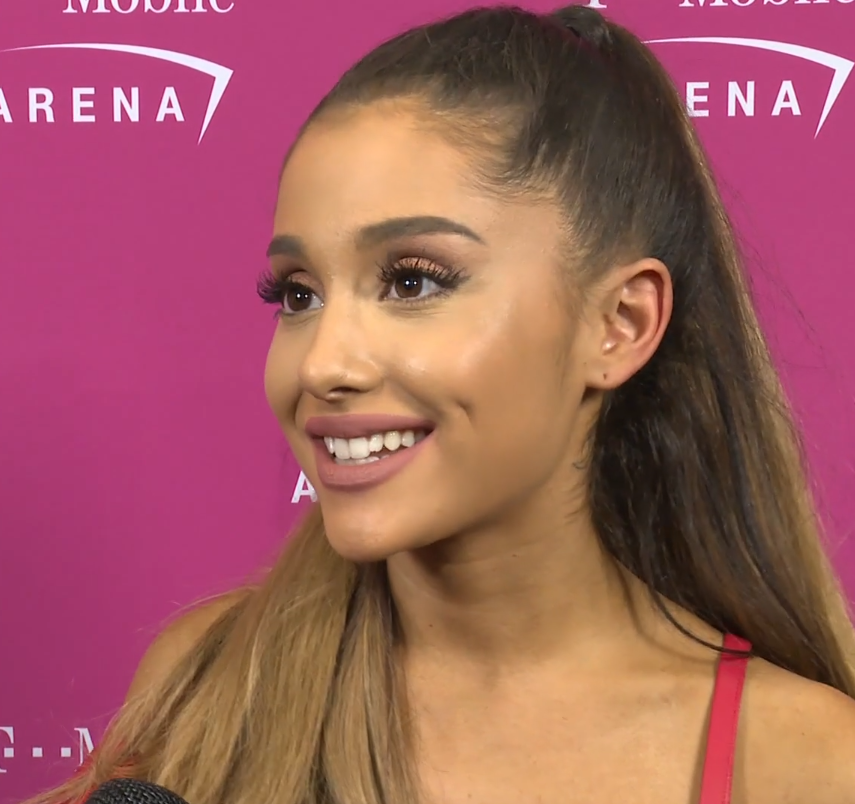
Ariana Grande, winner of Best Cover Song

The nominees were announced via Twitter on August 22, 2017. 24 of the awards were announced on September 24 at the Streamy Premiere Awards in Santa Monica, hosted by Lloyd Ahlquist. The remaining 17 awards were announced during the main ceremony at The Beverly Hilton on September 26. As part of a deal between Dick Clark Productions and Twitter, the awards were livestreamed on Twitter. Winners of the categories were selected by the Streamys Blue Ribbon Panel except for the Audience Choice awards which were put to a public vote.

Winners are listed first, in bold.

OVERALL
Audience Choice Award for Show of the Year	Audience Choice Award for Creator of the Year
**Sugar Pine 7**; Good Mythical Morning; Kian & JC; The King of Random; The Philip DeFranco Show; REACT; Rooster Teeth; The Try Guys; UNHhhh; The Young Turks	**The Dolan Twins**; Cameron Dallas; Casey Neistat; David Dobrik; Jake Paul; Jenna Marbles; Lilly Singh; Liza Koshy; Logan Paul; Shane Dawson
International	Breakout Creator
**Juanpa Zurita**; Fernanfloo; Lisa and Lena; Sebastian Villalobos; Wengie	**David Dobrik**; Binging with Babish; Brave Wilderness; Jake Paul
Comedy	Feature
**Liza Koshy**; h3h3Productions; Laura Clery; Rudy Mancuso; Sugar Pine 7	**This is Everything: Gigi Gorgeous**; Dirty 30; FML: The Movie; Ghostmates; The Thinning
Action or Sci-Fi	Animated
**Crypt TV**; Dimension 404; Rush: Inspired by Battlefield; Skinford; The Thinning	**RWBY**; Casually Explained; Domics; itsAlexClark; Simon's Cat
Documentary	First Person
**Psycho Family**; 60 Second Docs; Endangered; Great Big Story; This is Everything: Gigi Gorgeous	**Lilly Singh**; Casey Neistat; Dolan Twins; Jenna Marbles; Shane Dawson
Immersive	
**BlackBoxTV (BlackBox TV)**; 360 Wizard Battle (Corridor); Eleven Little Roosters (Rooster Teeth); The Global Gamer (The Game Theorists); Last Moments of Relationships (FBE)	
SOCIAL VIDEO
Live	Storyteller
**SMOSH Live**; BlameRyanCarter; BruhitsZach; Garth Brooks; Sofie Dossi	**King Bach**; Amanda Cerny; DJ Khaled; Lele Pons; Logan Paul
SERIES
Comedy Series	Drama Series
**Rhett & Link's Buddy System**; Magic Funhouse!; Mr. Student Body President; Drive Share; You Suck At Everything	**Cold**; Brown Girls; Carmilla (season 3); Single by 30; Caught
Indie Series	Non-Fiction Series
**Brown Girls**; Doomsday; Edgar Allen Poe's Murder Mystery Dinner Party; Everything's OK; Graves; Spring Street	**Ladylike**; Getting Doug With High; Logan Paul Vs...; Murder with Friends; REACT
SUBJECT AWARDS
Beauty	Fashion
**Patrick Starrr**; Jaclyn Hill; Laura Lee; Manny Mua; Simply Nailogical	**Tess Christine**; Amanda Steele; FENTY PUMA by Rihanna; Kelsey Simone; Sneaker Shopping
Food	Gaming
**Worth It**; Binging with Babish; Hot Ones; Nerdy Nummies; Tasty	**Smosh Games**; Achievement Hunter; iHasCupquake; JuegaGerman; Markiplier
Kids and Family	Lifestyle
**Brooklyn & Bailey**; Annie LeBlanc; Guava Juice; Roman Atwood Vlogs; What’s Inside?	**LaurDIY**; Andrea Russett; Baby Ariel; MyLifeAsEva; Niki and Gabi
News and Culture	Science or Education
**The Young Turks**; Cheddar; Complex News; NowThis; The Philip DeFranco Show	**Veritasium**; How To Make Everything; The King of Random; Marques Brownlee; Mind Field
Sports and Wellness	
**Blogilates**; 30 for 30 Shorts; Kevin Durant; QB1: Beyond the Lights; Tanner Fox	
PERFORMANCE
Acting in a Comedy	Acting in a Drama
**Mamrie Hart (Dirty 30)**; Arden Rose (Mr. Student Body President); Jason Nash (FML: The Movie); Jeremy Shada (Mr. Student Body President); Quinta Brunson (Broke)	**DeStorm Power (Caught)**; Annalise Basso (Cold); Harry Shum Jr. (Single By 30); Logan Paul (The Thinning); Natasha Negovanlis (Carmilla Season 3”)
Collaboration	Dance
**Honest Trailers** and **Ryan Reynolds** **(Logan Feat. Deadpool)**; Casey Neistat and Jesse Wellens (Human Flying Drone); Jon Cozart and Thomas Sanders (RIP Vine: A Song); Kate Albrecht and Joey Zehr (Omg We’re Coming Over!); The Rock, Lilly Singh, Markiplier, Grace Helbig, Roman Atwood, Gigi Gorgeous, Alex Wassabi, LaurDIY, King Bach, Flula, and Brittney Smith (The YouTube Factory)	**Alyson Stoner**; Chachi Gonzales; Matt Steffanina; Tessa Brooks; Tricia Miranda
Ensemble	
**Mr. Student Body President**; Caught; Dirty 30; McJuggerNuggets; The Try Guys	
MUSIC
Breakthrough Artist	Cover Song
**Poppy**; 21 Savage; dodie; Marian Hill; Zara Larsson	**Ariana Grande, "Somewhere Over The Rainbow" (Judy Garland)**; Alex Aiono ft. Ar'mon and Trey, "I Spy, T-Shirt, Isn’t She Lovely, & Swang Mashup" (Various Artists); Ashley Tisdale ft. Vanessa Hudgens, "Ex’s & Oh’s" (Elle King); Boyce Avenue ft. Sarah Hyland, "Closer" (The Chainsmokers ft. Halsey); Walk Off The Earth, "Shape Of You" (Ed Sheeran)
CRAFT AWARDS
Cinematography	Costume Design
**Casey Neistat (Casey Neistat)**; Devin Graham (Devin Supertramp); Gavin Free and Daniel Gruchy (The Slow Mo Guys); Jon Keng (Pineapple); Sawyer Hartman (sawyerhartman)	**Brandon Rogers, Kimberly Rice, and Jonathan Hinman (Magic Funhouse!)**; Ann Foley (Marvel's Agents of S.H.I.E.L.D.: Slingshot); Autumn Steed (Dimension 404); Jessica Margolis (Lindsey Stirling); Sarah Grace Hart, Sinead Persaud, and Mary Kate Wiles (Edgar Allen Poe's Murder Mystery Dinner Party)
Directing	Editing
**Jack Ferry and Ryan Hunter (Mr. Student Body President)**; Jesse Wellens (Jesse); John Fortenberry (Rhett & Link's Buddy System); Steven Suptic (Sugar Pine 7); Wesley Chan and Philip Wang (Single By 30)	**The Game Theorists (Edward Newton, Thomas Torbergsen, Alex Sedgewick, Ronnie Edwards, Daniel Seibert, Lee Black, and Ryder Burgin)**; Bad Lip Reading; Casey Neistat; Liza Koshy; Sugar Pine 7 (Steven Suptic)
Visual and Special Effects	Writing
**Sam Gorski and Niko Pueringer (Corridor Digital)**; Nikolay Zamkovoy (Super Power Beat Down); Dimension 404 (Playfight and RocketJump); Gary Scullion (Sneaky Zebra); Jungle of Sharks and Blood Brothers (Skal)	**DeStorm Power (Caught)**; Casually Explained; Josh Gal, Amanda Brooke-Perrin, Jill Gosliky, Aaron Krebs, and EpicLLOYD (Epic Studios); Shaun Diston, Ryan Hunter and Jack Ferry (Mr. Student Body President); Spencer Gilbert, Joe Starr, Dan Murrell, and Andy Signore (Honest Trailers)
BRAND AWARDS
Branded Video or Series	Influencer Campaign
**The Disappearing Girl, Collins Key (AT&T)**; Back To School – Mommy Wars Spoof, What’s Up Moms? (Fruit Of The Loom); Ping Pong Trick Shots 3, Dude Perfect (Oreos); "Rings" TV Store Prank (Paramount Pictures); The Wolf: The Hunt Continues Starring Christian Slater (HP)	**Samsung** **(Casey Neistat)**; Amazon Fire Tablets (Peter Heacock, Zach King, Chad Suter); DiGiorno (Redfoo, Devvon Terrell, Diamond White, Madilyn Bailey, Marcus Perez, O-Fresh); Fergie / aaro Entertainment (Various Musical.ly Artists); Power Rangers Movie (Lilly Singh, Dude Perfect)

=== Purpose Awards ===
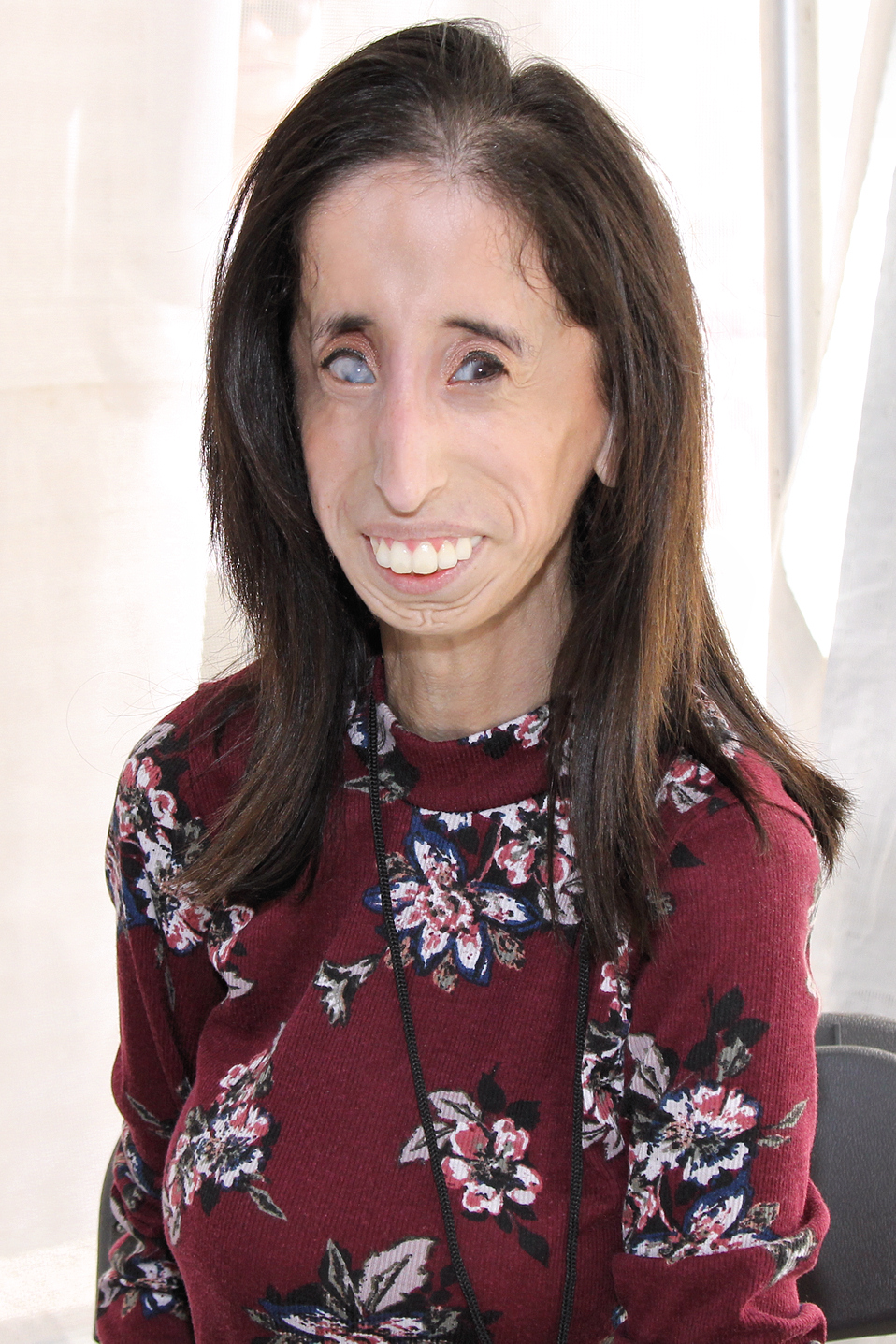
Lizzie Velásquez, winner of the Creator Inspiration Award at the Purpose Awards

The first annual Purpose Awards were presented at a separate event hosted by Burnie Burns and Ashley Jenkins at the Conga Room in L.A. Live on September 25, 2017. Each Purpose Award category has three honorees with one of the honorees also receiving the "Inspiration Award" for that category. Honorees are listed in bold and the Inspiration Award winner is indicated with a ‡.

Creator Award	**Hannah Hart**; **Lilly Singh**; **Lizzie Velásquez** ‡
Company or Brand Award	**Activision Blizzard (Call of Duty Endowment)**; **Bank of America (Special Olympics)**; **Ford (Geena Davis Institute on Gender in Media) ‡**
Nonprofit or NGO Award	**Global Citizen**; **Make-A-Wish**; **Meals On Wheels ‡**
Campaign Award	**AT&T "#LaterHaters" ‡**; **Bill & Melinda Gates "2017 Annual Letter"**; **Walmart "Fight Hunger. Spark Change."**
Uniter Award	**Jérôme Jarre ‡**; **Karlie Kloss**; **Omaze**
Legacy Award	**The Ad Council ‡**

== Reception ==
Mikey Glazer of TheWrap described the show as "rowdy, political and Jake Paul-hating" and described Jon Cozart's opening speech as "searing". Talking to The Hollywood Reporter, Cozart described his job as host as "to dig into the Streamys and reveal the hypocrisy of the new media industry. I'm exposing us for what we are, which is a room full of narcissists with good intentions." According to The Hollywood Reporter, two main themes of the night were politics and diversity. Director of Brown Girls Sam Bailey praised the show for focusing on creators saying "It really shows there is work done at home by individual people without a network behind them."

== See also ==
- List of Streamy Award winners
