= Dana Fischer =

American Magic: The Gathering player

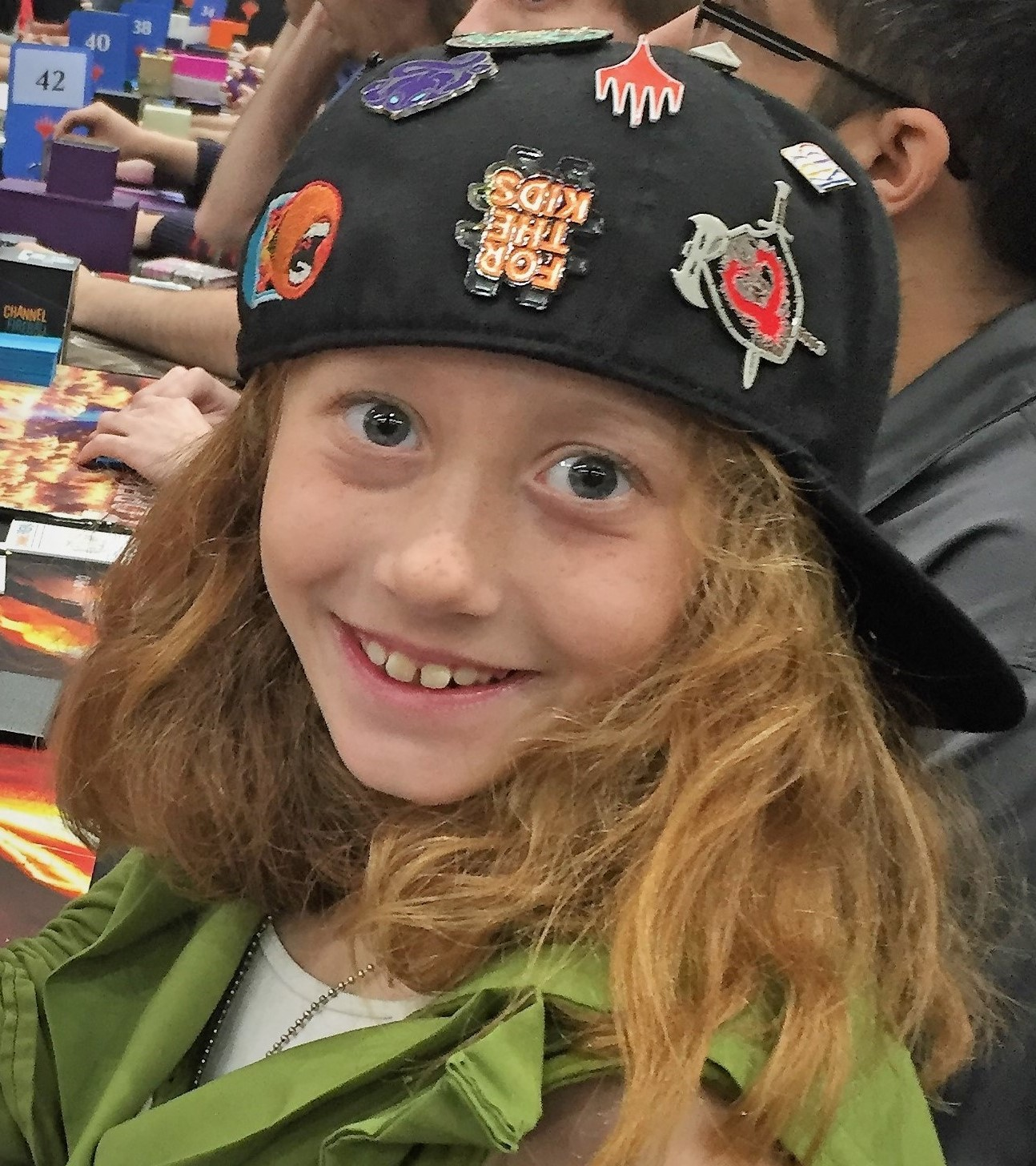
- Fischer at Grand Prix Los Angeles 2019
- Born: 23 July 2010 (age 16); California, United States
- Years active: 2014–present
- Known for: Youngest competitive Magic: The Gathering player

Dana Fischer is an American Magic: The Gathering player. She holds a joint record as the youngest player to make the second day of a Magic Grand Prix tournament (at age eight) and is the youngest player to win a cash prize at a Grand Prix (at age nine).

== Background and family life ==
Dana Fischer was born in July 2010, and lives with her mother, father, and older sister in Carmel Valley, San Diego. Her father, Adam Fischer, started teaching Dana and her sister how to play Magic before they were old enough to read the text on the cards, and they learned by memorizing how the cards functioned in the game. Dana's sister lost interest in Magic over the next few years, while Dana continued to play. With the help of her father, Fischer wrote several articles for ChannelFireball's Magic: The Gathering strategy website.

== Competitive Magic events ==
Dana Fischer's first Magic event outside her home was a Two-Headed Giant side event with her father at Grand Prix San Diego in August 2015. At age five, she could not read all the cards, so her father guided her play. She competed in her first Grand Prix on her own in Portland, Oregon in August 2016, and attended three other Grand Prix events over the next year. She set herself a goal to win five out of nine matches, which she achieved in Las Vegas in June 2017, at the age of six. To accomplish this, she needed to play at least 20 games over a 12-hour period with only minor breaks, and achieve a better record than 55% of the more than 3,000 (mostly adult) players competing. Her parents allowed her to miss two days of school to attend the Las Vegas tournament; they said the game is educational and helps Dana with math, reading, strategy, and social skills above her school grade. Fischer's next goal was to become the youngest player to make the second day of a Grand Prix tournament, which would require six match wins.

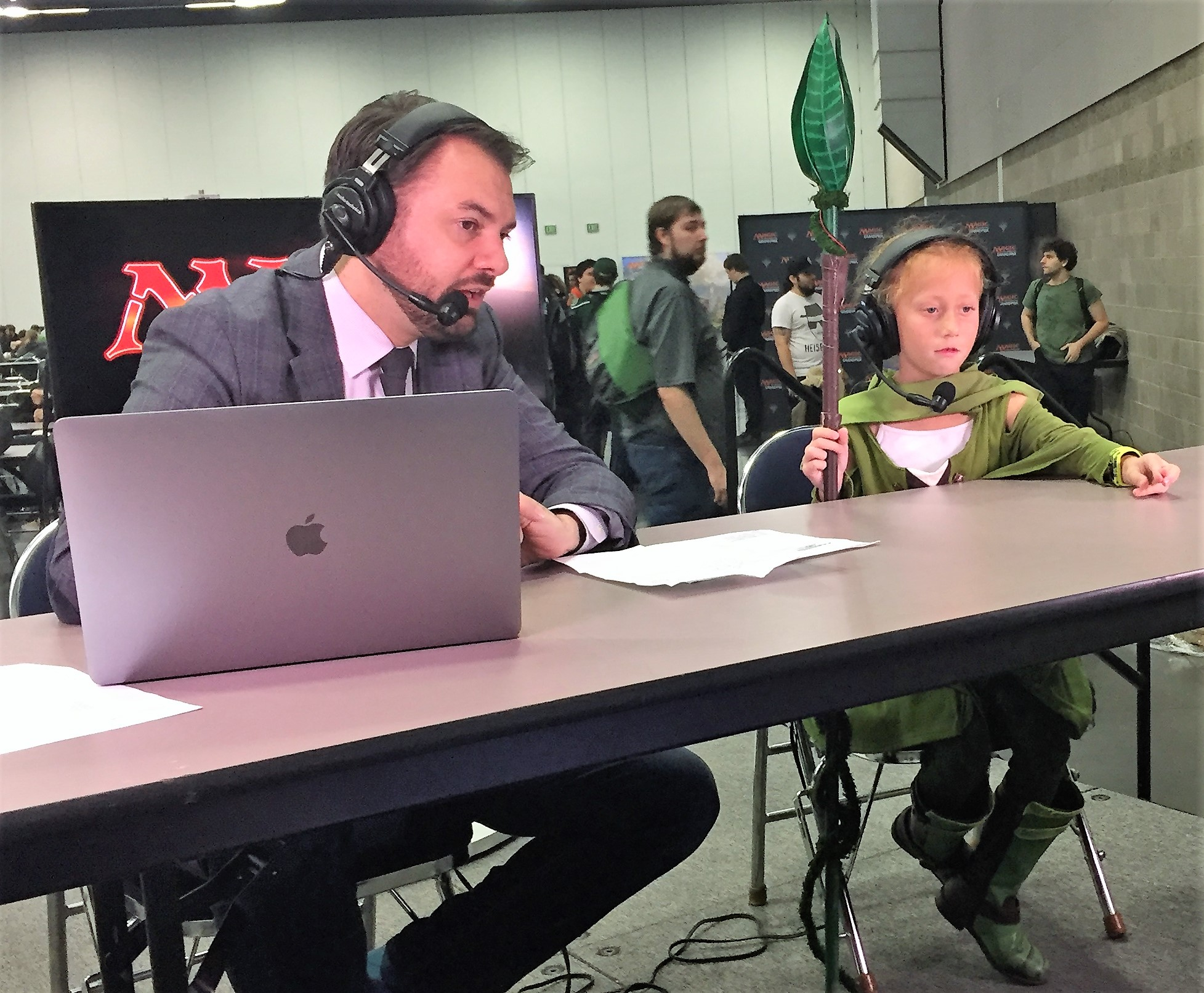
Fischer was invited to provide commentary on matches at Grand Prix Portland 2017 with Magic commentator Marshall Sutcliffe.

In 2017 Fischer became known in the competitive Magic community. Some of her matches would be "featured", when her game play would be recorded on video and streamed live and/or played after the tournament, and she would be often invited to the color commentator booth to discuss the matches live. She got a sponsorship from ChannelFireball, a popular Magic retailer, and tournament organizer, and a documentary video made about her by 60 Second Docs. In 2018, Wizards of the Coast, the makers of Magic: The Gathering, made a longer video about her.

In February 2018, Fischer went to her first tournament outside the United States, in Lyon, France. Originally competing in another country would have been a celebration for making day 2 at a United States Grand Prix, but it became a family trip instead. She says she was not bothered by non-English language cards, since she could recognize them by picture, the way she learned to play before learning to read.

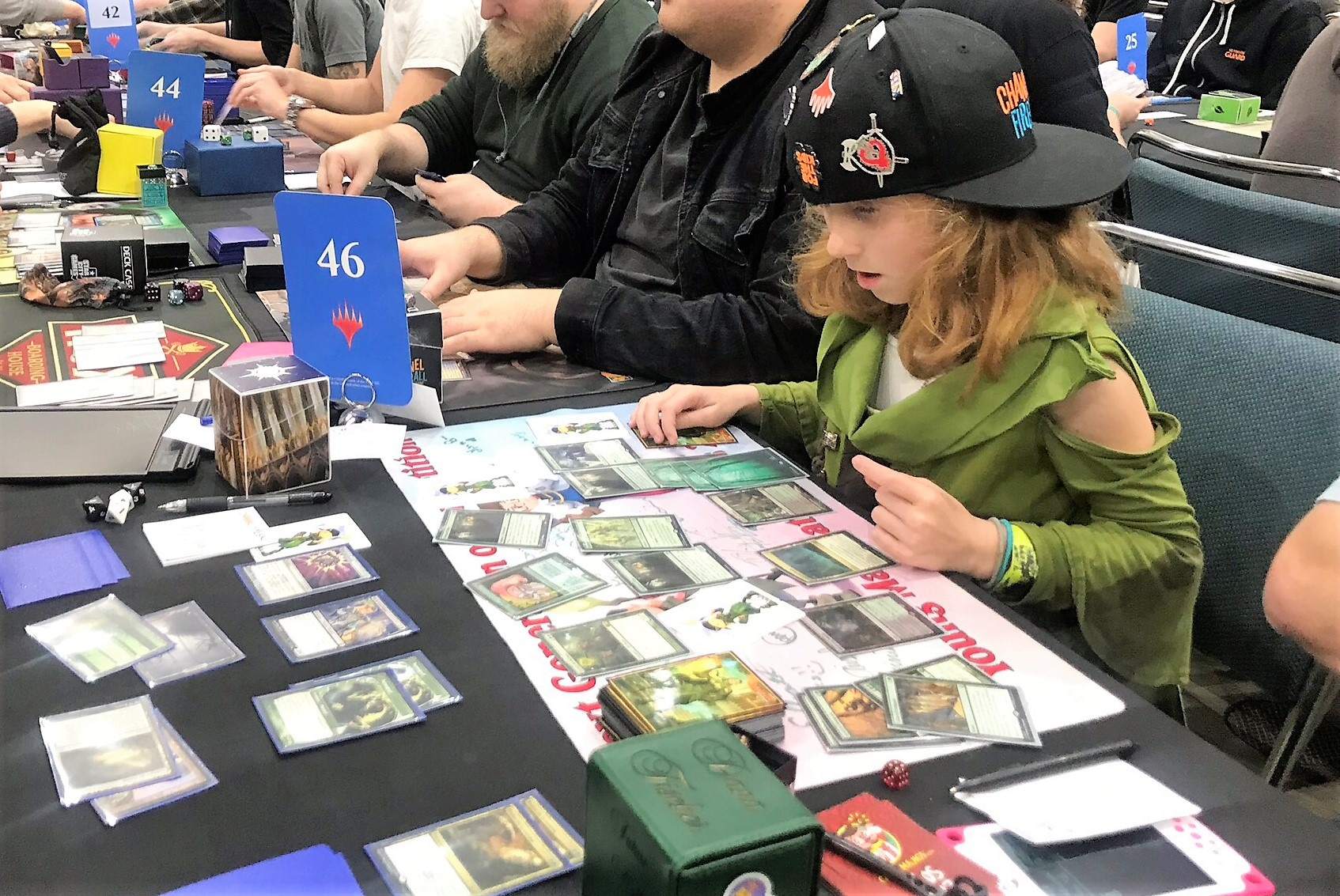
Fischer playing at Grand Prix Los Angeles 2019

In March 2019, aged eight, Fischer achieved her goal of becoming the youngest player to reach Day 2 at a Grand Prix, in Los Angeles. (Note: While sources reported she was the youngest, later research showed that Kurt Porter, also age 8, had advanced to day 2 in Grand Prix Kuala Lumpur in 2010. Wizards of the Coast considers them tied for youngest.) She won six of eight matches, and advanced to the second day among the top 15-20% of about 1,570 mostly adult players. She said her next tournament goals would be to win a number of matches equal to her age, and to bring home a cash prize.

Fischer achieved both of these goals at Grand Prix Austin in January 2020. She finished in 46th place out of 801 players, with a 10–4–1 win-loss-draw record, and earned $300. Fischer was nine years old, making her the youngest to win cash at a Magic Grand Prix. She was at 13th place at the end of the first day with an 8–1 record. After the match, she tweeted "now have more GP Day 2s than my dad." In her tournament report for ChannelFireball, she wrote that she was especially glad to win cash because she could buy something to share with her sister, who does not play much Magic, making her win something that could benefit the rest of the family as well.

Her continuing goal is to get more kids and women to play Magic, to show that, as she says, "young people can do amazing and hard things".

== Play style ==
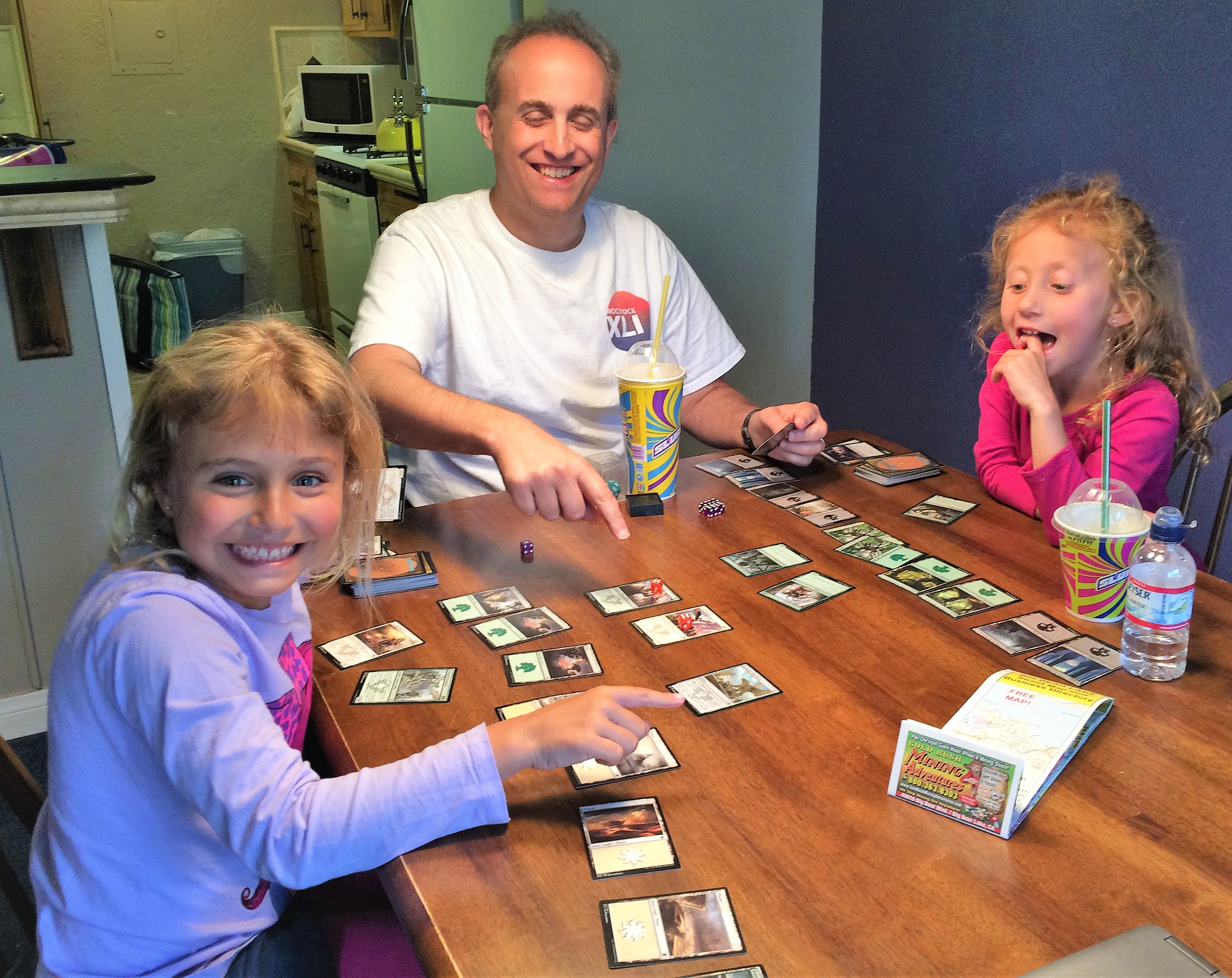
Fischer playing Magic with her father and sister in 2016

Initially Fischer played her competitive matches with her father sitting beside her, but not offering her any advice or help, other than helping hold her hand of cards and shuffle her deck, because her hands were too small to do it herself. He takes notes on the match, and advises her on what she did well and could have done better.

Since the 2017 San Diego Comic-Con, she has attended matches in cosplay as the Elf planeswalker Nissa Revane – though she replaced the original costume's black wig and pointed ears with a ChannelFireball baseball cap that she places pins on and wears backwards or sideways.

As she grew up, Fischer continued to play, but stopped needing her father to hold her cards for her, allowing Adam to play separately. They do, however, often play the same deck to help each other prepare. In August 2025, they each reached day two in the Orlando, Florida Spotlight Series event.
