= 2017 Teen Choice Awards =

Award ceremony

- Date: August 13, 2017
- Location: Galen Center, Los Angeles, California

Television/radio coverage
- Network: Fox

The 2017 Teen Choice Awards ceremony was held on August 13, 2017. The awards celebrated the year's achievements in music, film, television, sports, fashion, comedy, and the Internet, and were voted on by viewers aged 13 to 19 through various social media sites. A three-hour musical festival called "Teen Fest" and hosted by Jake Paul was streamed exclusively on YouTube with some of the event appearing during the Teen Choice broadcast. Throughout the show, several celebrities – including Vanessa Hudgens, Zendaya and Lauren Jauregui of Fifth Harmony – addressed the aftermath of the 2017 Unite the Right rally and encouraged teens to speak out against violence and hate.

== Performers ==
- Louis Tomlinson ft. Bebe Rexha & Digital Farm Animals — "Back to You"
- Clean Bandit ft. Zara Larsson — "Rockabye" and "Symphony"
- Rita Ora — "Your Song"
- Kyle ft. Lil Yachty - "iSpy" and "Forever Young"
- French Montana & Rae Sremmurd - "Unforgettable" & "Black Beatles'"
- Cast of Star - "Can't Think About You"

== Presenters ==
- The Dolan Twins
- Lucy Hale
- Janel Parrish
- Chris Pratt
- Tyler Posey
- Yara Shahidi
- Hudson Yang
- Fifth Harmony
- Logan Paul
- Anthony Anderson
- Cast of Riverdale

== Winners and nominees ==
The first wave of nominations were announced on June 19, 2017. The second wave was announced on July 12, 2017. Winners are listed first, in bold. Other nominees are in alphabetical order.

=== Movies ===
Choice Action Movie	Choice Action Movie Actor
**Wonder Woman**; The Fate of the Furious; Logan; Pirates of the Caribbean: Dead Men Tell No Tales; Transformers: The Last Knight; XXX: Return of Xander Cage	**Chris Pine – Wonder Woman**; Johnny Depp – Pirates of the Caribbean: Dead Men Tell No Tales; Vin Diesel – XXX: Return of Xander Cage & The Fate of the Furious; Hugh Jackman – Logan; Dwayne Johnson – The Fate of the Furious; Brenton Thwaites – Pirates of the Caribbean: Dead Men Tell No Tales
Choice Action Movie Actress	Choice Sci-Fi Movie
**Gal Gadot – Wonder Woman**; Nina Dobrev – XXX: Return of Xander Cage; Deepika Padukone – XXX: Return of Xander Cage; Michelle Rodriguez – The Fate of the Furious; Ruby Rose – XXX: Return of Xander Cage; Kaya Scodelario – Pirates of the Caribbean: Dead Men Tell No Tales	**Guardians of the Galaxy Vol. 2**; Arrival; Kong: Skull Island; Power Rangers; Rogue One: A Star Wars Story; The Space Between Us
Choice Sci-Fi Movie Actor	Choice Sci-Fi Movie Actress
**Chris Pratt – Guardians of the Galaxy Vol. 2**; Asa Butterfield – The Space Between Us; Tom Hiddleston – Kong: Skull Island; Diego Luna – Rogue One: A Star Wars Story; Dacre Montgomery – Power Rangers; Jeremy Renner – Arrival	**Zoe Saldaña – Guardians of the Galaxy Vol. 2**; Amy Adams – Arrival; Becky G – Power Rangers; Felicity Jones – Rogue One: A Star Wars Story; Brie Larson – Kong: Skull Island; Naomi Scott – Power Rangers
Choice Fantasy Movie	Choice Fantasy Movie Actor
**Beauty and the Beast**; Doctor Strange; Fantastic Beasts and Where to Find Them; Miss Peregrine's Home for Peculiar Children; Moana	**Dwayne Johnson – Moana**; Asa Butterfield – Miss Peregrine's Home for Peculiar Children; Benedict Cumberbatch – Doctor Strange; Eddie Redmayne – Fantastic Beasts and Where to Find Them; Dan Stevens – Beauty and the Beast
Choice Fantasy Movie Actress	Choice Drama Movie
**Emma Watson – Beauty and the Beast**; Auli'i Cravalho – Moana; Eva Green – Miss Peregrine's Home for Peculiar Children; Rachel McAdams – Doctor Strange; Katherine Waterston – Fantastic Beasts and Where to Find Them	**Everything, Everything**; Before I Fall; The Edge of Seventeen; Gifted; Hidden Figures; The Shack
Choice Drama Movie Actor	Choice Drama Movie Actress
**Kian Lawley – Before I Fall**; Chris Evans – Gifted; Andrew Garfield – Hacksaw Ridge; Taylor Lautner – Run the Tide; Nick Robinson – Everything, Everything	**Emma Watson – The Circle**; Zoey Deutch – Before I Fall; Taraji P. Henson – Hidden Figures; Hailee Steinfeld – The Edge of Seventeen; Amandla Stenberg – Everything, Everything
Choice Comedy Movie	Choice Comedy Movie Actor
**Finding Dory**; Cars 3; Keeping Up with the Joneses; The Lego Batman Movie; Table 19	**Zac Efron – Baywatch**; Will Arnett – The Lego Batman Movie; Zach Galifianakis – Keeping Up with the Joneses; Dwayne Johnson – Baywatch; Owen Wilson – Cars 3; Ricky Garcia - Bigger Fatter Liar
Choice Comedy Movie Actress	Choice Movie Villain
**Ellen DeGeneres – Finding Dory**; Alexandra Daddario – Baywatch; Gal Gadot – Keeping Up with the Joneses; Jennifer Hudson – Sandy Wexler; Tori Kelly – Sing; Anna Kendrick – Table 19	**Luke Evans – Beauty and the Beast**; Elizabeth Banks – Power Rangers; Javier Bardem – Pirates of the Caribbean: Dead Men Tell No Tales; Priyanka Chopra – Baywatch; James McAvoy – Split; Charlize Theron – The Fate of the Furious
Choice Breakout Movie Star	Choice Summer Movie
**Auli'i Cravalho – Moana**; Tom Holland – Spider-Man: Homecoming; Janelle Monáe – Hidden Figures; Deepika Padukone – xXx: Return of Xander Cage; Harry Styles – Dunkirk; Zendaya – Spider-Man: Homecoming	**Spider-Man: Homecoming**; Cars 3; Pirates of the Caribbean: Dead Men Tell No Tales; Transformers: The Last Knight; War for the Planet of the Apes; Wonder Woman
Choice Summer Movie Actor	Choice Summer Movie Actress
**Tom Holland – Spider-Man: Homecoming**; Ansel Elgort – Baby Driver; Chris Pine – Wonder Woman; Harry Styles – Dunkirk; Mark Wahlberg – Transformers: The Last Knight; Owen Wilson – Cars 3	**Zendaya – Spider-Man: Homecoming**; Cara Delevingne – Valerian and the City of a Thousand Planets; Gal Gadot – Wonder Woman; Isabela Moner – Transformers: The Last Knight; Mandy Moore – 47 Meters Down; Bella Thorne – Amityville: The Awakening
Choice Movie Ship	
**Emma Watson & Dan Stevens – Beauty and the Beast**; Vin Diesel & Michelle Rodriguez – The Fate of the Furious; Gal Gadot & Chris Pine – Wonder Woman; Dwayne Johnson & Zac Efron – Baywatch; Deepika Padukone & Ruby Rose – XXX: Return of Xander Cage; Chris Pratt & Zoe Saldaña – Guardians of the Galaxy Vol. 2	

=== Television ===
Choice Drama TV Show	Choice Drama TV Actor
**Riverdale**; Empire; Famous in Love; Pretty Little Liars; Star; This Is Us	**Cole Sprouse – Riverdale**; Sterling K. Brown – This Is Us; Ian Harding – Pretty Little Liars; Jussie Smollett – Empire; Milo Ventimiglia – This Is Us; Jesse Williams – Grey's Anatomy
Choice Drama TV Actress	Choice Sci-Fi/Fantasy TV Show
**Lucy Hale – Pretty Little Liars**; Troian Bellisario – Pretty Little Liars; Ashley Benson – Pretty Little Liars; Shay Mitchell – Pretty Little Liars; Sasha Pieterse – Pretty Little Liars; Bella Thorne – Famous in Love	**The Vampire Diaries**; Shadowhunters; Stranger Things; Supernatural; Teen Wolf; Timeless
Choice Sci-Fi/Fantasy TV Actor	Choice Sci-Fi/Fantasy TV Actress
**Dylan O'Brien – Teen Wolf**; Jensen Ackles – Supernatural; Matthew Daddario – Shadowhunters; Joseph Morgan – The Originals; Bob Morley – The 100; Ian Somerhalder – The Vampire Diaries	**Kat Graham – The Vampire Diaries**; Jennifer Morrison – Once Upon a Time; Lana Parrilla – Once Upon a Time; Abigail Spencer – Timeless; Eliza Taylor – The 100; Emeraude Toubia – Shadowhunters
Choice Action TV Show	Choice Action TV Actor
**The Flash**; Agents of S.H.I.E.L.D.; Arrow; Gotham; Lethal Weapon; Supergirl	**Grant Gustin – The Flash**; Stephen Amell – Arrow; Clayne Crawford – Lethal Weapon; Gabriel Luna – Agents of S.H.I.E.L.D.; Wentworth Miller – Prison Break; Chris Wood – Supergirl
Choice Action TV Actress	Choice Comedy TV Show
**Melissa Benoist – Supergirl**; Jordana Brewster – Lethal Weapon; Caity Lotz – Legends of Tomorrow; Danielle Panabaker – The Flash; Candice Patton – The Flash; Emily Bett Rickards – Arrow	**Fuller House**; Baby Daddy; Brooklyn Nine-Nine; Jane the Virgin; One Day at a Time; Young & Hungry
Choice Comedy TV Actor	Choice Comedy TV Actress
**Jean-Luc Bilodeau – Baby Daddy**; Anthony Anderson – Black-ish; Jaime Camil – Jane the Virgin; Micah Fowler – Speechless; Andy Samberg – Brooklyn Nine-Nine; Hudson Yang – Fresh Off the Boat	**Candace Cameron Bure – Fuller House**; Rose McIver – iZombie; Emma Roberts – Scream Queens; Gina Rodriguez – Jane the Virgin; Yara Shahidi – Black-ish; Zendaya – K.C. Undercover
Choice Animated TV Show	Choice Reality TV Show
**Family Guy**; Bob's Burgers; Gravity Falls; Rick and Morty; Sonic Boom; Steven Universe	**The Voice**; Chasing Cameron; Dance Moms; Keeping Up with the Kardashians; MasterChef Junior; Total Bellas
Choice Throwback TV Show	Choice TV Personality
**One Tree Hill**; Buffy the Vampire Slayer; The Fresh Prince of Bel-Air; The O.C.; Sister, Sister; Veronica Mars	**Ellen DeGeneres – The Ellen DeGeneres Show**; Anthony Anderson – To Tell the Truth; Tyra Banks – America's Got Talent; James Corden – The Late Late Show with James Corden; Jimmy Fallon – The Tonight Show Starring Jimmy Fallon; Blake Shelton – The Voice
Choice TV Villain	Choice Breakout TV Star
**Janel Parrish – Pretty Little Liars**; Grant Gustin – The Flash; Teri Hatcher – Supergirl; Mark Pellegrino – Supernatural; Josh Segarra – Arrow; Cory Michael Smith – Gotham	**Lili Reinhart – Riverdale**; KJ Apa – Riverdale; Millie Bobby Brown – Stranger Things; Ryan Destiny – Star; Chrissy Metz – This Is Us; Finn Wolfhard – Stranger Things
Choice Breakout TV Show	Choice Summer TV Show
**Riverdale**; Famous in Love; Star; Stranger Things; This Is Us; Timeless	**Teen Wolf**; America's Got Talent; Beat Shazam; The Bold Type; The Fosters; So You Think You Can Dance
Choice Summer TV Actor	Choice Summer TV Actress
**Tyler Posey – Teen Wolf**; Noah Centineo – The Fosters; Cody Christian – Teen Wolf; Kyle Harris – Stitchers; David Lambert – The Fosters; Harry Shum Jr. – Shadowhunters	**Holland Roden – Teen Wolf**; Aisha Dee – The Bold Type; Hilary Duff – Younger; Shelley Hennig – Teen Wolf; Maia Mitchell – The Fosters; Cierra Ramirez – The Fosters
Choice TV Ship	
**Lili Reinhart & Cole Sprouse – Riverdale**; Melissa Benoist & Chris Wood – Supergirl; Matthew Daddario & Harry Shum Jr. – Shadowhunters; Shay Mitchell & Sasha Pieterse – Pretty Little Liars; Dylan O'Brien & Holland Roden – Teen Wolf; Eliza Taylor & Bob Morley – The 100	

=== Movies and television ===
Choice Scene Stealer	Choice Liplock
**Camila Mendes – Riverdale**; RJ Cyler – Power Rangers; Josh Gad – Beauty and the Beast; Taylor Lautner – Scream Queens; Colin O'Donoghue – Once Upon a Time; Michael Rooker – Guardians of the Galaxy Vol. 2	**Emma Watson & Dan Stevens – Beauty and the Beast**; Melissa Benoist & Chris Wood – Supergirl; Orlando Bloom & Keira Knightley – Pirates of the Caribbean: Dead Men Tell No Tales; Matthew Daddario & Harry Shum Jr. – Shadowhunters; Gal Gadot & Chris Pine – Wonder Woman; Jennifer Morrison & Colin O'Donoghue – Once Upon a Time
Choice Hissy Fit	
**Madelaine Petsch – Riverdale**; Anthony Anderson – Black-ish; Malcolm Barrett – Timeless; Luke Evans – Beauty and the Beast; Kurt Russell – Guardians of the Galaxy Vol. 2; Dan Stevens – Beauty and the Beast	

=== Music ===
Choice Male Artist	Choice Female Artist
**Harry Styles**; Justin Bieber; Bruno Mars; Shawn Mendes; Ed Sheeran; The Weeknd	**Ariana Grande**; Alessia Cara; Miley Cyrus; Selena Gomez; Katy Perry; Hailee Steinfeld
Choice Music Group	Choice Country Artist
**Fifth Harmony**; The Chainsmokers; Little Mix; Maroon 5; Twenty One Pilots; The Vamps	**Carrie Underwood**; Kelsea Ballerini; Luke Bryan; Florida Georgia Line; Sam Hunt; Blake Shelton
Choice Electronic/Dance Artist	Choice Latin Artist
**Calvin Harris**; Steve Aoki; Martin Garrix; David Guetta; Major Lazer; Zedd	**CNCO**; Daddy Yankee; Luis Fonsi; Enrique Iglesias; Maluma; Shakira
Choice R&B/Hip-Hop Artist	Choice Rock Artist
**Beyoncé**; Chance the Rapper; Drake; Kendrick Lamar; Nicki Minaj; Rihanna	**Harry Styles**; Imagine Dragons; Linkin Park; Paramore; Twenty One Pilots; X Ambassadors
Choice Song: Male Artist	Choice Song: Female Artist
**"Slow Hands" – Niall Horan**; "Body Like a Back Road" – Sam Hunt; "Despacito" – Luis Fonsi & Daddy Yankee featuring Justin Bieber; "Shape of You" – Ed Sheeran; "Sign of the Times" – Harry Styles; "That's What I Like" – Bruno Mars	**"Crying in the Club" – Camila Cabello**; "Bad Liar" – Selena Gomez; "Issues" – Julia Michaels; "Malibu" – Miley Cyrus; "Most Girls" – Hailee Steinfeld; "Scars to Your Beautiful" – Alessia Cara
Choice Song: Group	Choice Music Collaboration
**"Down" – Fifth Harmony featuring Gucci Mane**; "Believer" – Imagine Dragons; "Closer" – The Chainsmokers featuring Halsey; "Guys My Age" – Hey Violet; "Heathens" – Twenty One Pilots; "Shout Out to My Ex" – Little Mix	**"Just Hold On" – Steve Aoki and Louis Tomlinson**; "God, Your Mama, and Me" – Florida Georgia Line featuring Backstreet Boys; "I Don't Wanna Live Forever" – Zayn & Taylor Swift; "It Ain't Me" – Kygo and Selena Gomez; "No Promises" – Cheat Codes featuring Demi Lovato; "Stay" – Zedd and Alessia Cara
Choice Pop Song	Choice Country Song
**"Shape of You" – Ed Sheeran**; "24k Magic" – Bruno Mars; "Closer" – The Chainsmokers featuring Halsey; "Don't Wanna Know" – Maroon 5 featuring Kendrick Lamar; "Love on the Brain" – Rihanna; "Stay" – Zedd and Alessia Cara	**"Body Like a Back Road" – Sam Hunt**; "Craving You" – Thomas Rhett featuring Maren Morris; "Every Time I Hear That Song" – Blake Shelton; "The Fighter" – Keith Urban featuring Carrie Underwood; "God, Your Mama, and Me" – Florida Georgia Line featuring Backstreet Boys; "In Case You Didn't Know" – Brett Young
Choice Electronic/Dance Song	Choice Latin Song
**"Know No Better" – Major Lazer featuring Travis Scott, Camila Cabello & Quavo**; "2U" – David Guetta featuring Justin Bieber; "It Ain't Me" – Kygo and Selena Gomez; "Just Hold On" – Steve Aoki and Louis Tomlinson; "Rockabye" – Clean Bandit featuring Sean Paul & Anne-Marie; "Something Just like This" – The Chainsmokers and Coldplay	**"Despacito" – Luis Fonsi & Daddy Yankee featuring Justin Bieber**; "Chantaje" – Shakira featuring Maluma; "Deja Vu" – Prince Royce & Shakira; "Hey Ma" – Pitbull & J Balvin featuring Camila Cabello; "No Le Hablen de Amor" – CD9; "Reggaetón Lento (Bailemos)" – CNCO
Choice R&B/Hip-Hop Song	Choice Rock/Alternative Song
**"I'm the One" – DJ Khaled featuring Justin Bieber, Quavo, Chance the Rapper & Lil Wayne**; "Glorious" – Macklemore featuring Skylar Grey; "Location" – Khalid; "Passionfruit" – Drake; "Redbone" – Childish Gambino; "That's What I Like" – Bruno Mars	**"Believer" – Imagine Dragons**; "Green Light" – Lorde; "Hard Times" – Paramore; "Heathens" – Twenty One Pilots; "Heavy" – Linkin Park featuring Kiiara; "Human" – Rag'n'Bone Man
Choice Breakout Artist	Choice Next Big Thing
**Chance the Rapper**; James Arthur; Halsey; Zara Larsson; Dua Lipa; Julia Michaels	**Grace VanderWaal**; Jonas Blue; Forever in Your Mind; Jax Jones; New Hope Club; The Tide
Choice Summer Song	Choice Summer Male Artist
**"Despacito" – Luis Fonsi & Daddy Yankee featuring Justin Bieber**; "Bad Liar" – Selena Gomez; "Castle on the Hill" – Ed Sheeran; "Malibu" – Miley Cyrus; "Stay" – Zedd & Alessia Cara; "That's What I Like" – Bruno Mars	**Shawn Mendes**; Justin Bieber; Niall Horan; Liam Payne; Harry Styles; Zedd
Choice Summer Female Artist	Choice Summer Group
**Camila Cabello**; Miley Cyrus; Selena Gomez; Halsey; Lorde; Katy Perry	**Fifth Harmony**; The Chainsmokers; Coldplay; Florida Georgia Line; Imagine Dragons; Little Mix
Choice Summer Music Tour	Choice International Artist
**Ariana Grande – Dangerous Woman Tour**; Sam Hunt – 15 in a 30 Tour; Kendrick Lamar – Damn Tour; Bruno Mars – 24K Magic World Tour; Shawn Mendes – Illuminate World Tour; Ed Sheeran – ÷ Tour	**BTS**; CD9; CNCO; EXO; Monsta X; Seventeen

=== Digital ===
Choice Male Web Star	Choice Female Web Star
**Logan Paul**; Cameron Dallas; The Dolan Twins; Ryan Higa; Casey Neistat; sWooZie	**Liza Koshy**; Eva Gutowski; Merrell Twins; Bethany Mota; Niki and Gabi; Lilly Singh
Choice Comedy Web Star	Choice Gamer
**Logan Paul**; Colleen Ballinger; The Dolan Twins; Liza Koshy; Lele Pons; Lilly Singh	**Ryan Ohmwrecker**; Vikram Singh Barn; Jaryd Lazar; Michael Santana; Rabia Yazbek; Saqib Zahid
Choice Fashion/Beauty Web Star	Choice Music Web Star
**Nikkie de Jager**; Andrea Brooks; Gigi Gorgeous; Kandee Johnson; Bethany Mota; Mia Stammer	**Jake Paul**; Cimorelli; Jack & Jack; Carson Lueders; Johnny Orlando; Leroy Sanchez
Choice Muser	Choice Twit
**Baby Ariel**; Danielle Cohn; Kristen Hancher; Isaiah Howard; Lisa and Lena; Jacob Sartorius	**Ellen DeGeneres**; Anna Kendrick; Blake Shelton; Chrissy Teigen; Justin Timberlake; Zendaya
Choice Instagrammer	Choice YouTuber
**Selena Gomez**; Beyoncé; Justin Bieber; Kendall Jenner; Kylie Jenner; Taylor Swift	**Jake Paul**; The Dolan Twins; Liza Koshy; Casey Neistat; Logan Paul; Lilly Singh
Choice Snapchatter	
**Ariana Grande**; Brett Eldredge; Selena Gomez; Kylie Jenner; DJ Khaled; Bella Thorne	

=== Fashion ===
Choice Male Hottie	Choice Female Hottie
**Shawn Mendes**; Justin Bieber; Zayn Malik; Liam Payne; Harry Styles; Louis Tomlinson	**Camila Cabello**; Selena Gomez; Paris Jackson; Deepika Padukone; Rihanna; Zendaya
Choice Style Icon	Choice Model
**Harry Styles**; Cara Delevingne; Selena Gomez; Zayn Malik; Rihanna; Zendaya	**Kendall Jenner**; Hailey Baldwin; Ashley Graham; Gigi Hadid; Paris Jackson; Winnie Harlow

=== Sports ===
Choice Male Athlete	Choice Female Athlete
**Stephen Curry**; John Cena; Rickie Fowler; LeBron James; Cristiano Ronaldo; Mike Trout	**Simone Biles**; Sasha Banks; The Bella Twins; Elena Delle Donne; Laurie Hernandez; Serena Williams

=== Miscellaneous ===
Choice Comedian	Choice Dancer
**The Dolan Twins**; Jordan Doww; Kevin Hart; Gabriel Iglesias; Hasan Minhaj; Lilly Singh	**Maddie Ziegler**; Derek Hough; Julianne Hough; Kida the Great; Chloe Lukasiak; tWitch
Choice Video Game	Choice Changemaker
**Overwatch**; Dota 2; Hearthstone; Heroes of the Storm; League of Legends; The Legend of Zelda: Breath of the Wild	**Ariana Grande**; Rowan Blanchard; Selena Gomez; Yara Shahidi; Ian Somerhalder; Shailene Woodley
"See Her" Award	Choice Fandom
**Vanessa Hudgens**	**Harmonizers**; Arianators; Beliebers; Selenators; Sheerios; Smilers
