= DeStorm Power =

American Internet celebrity

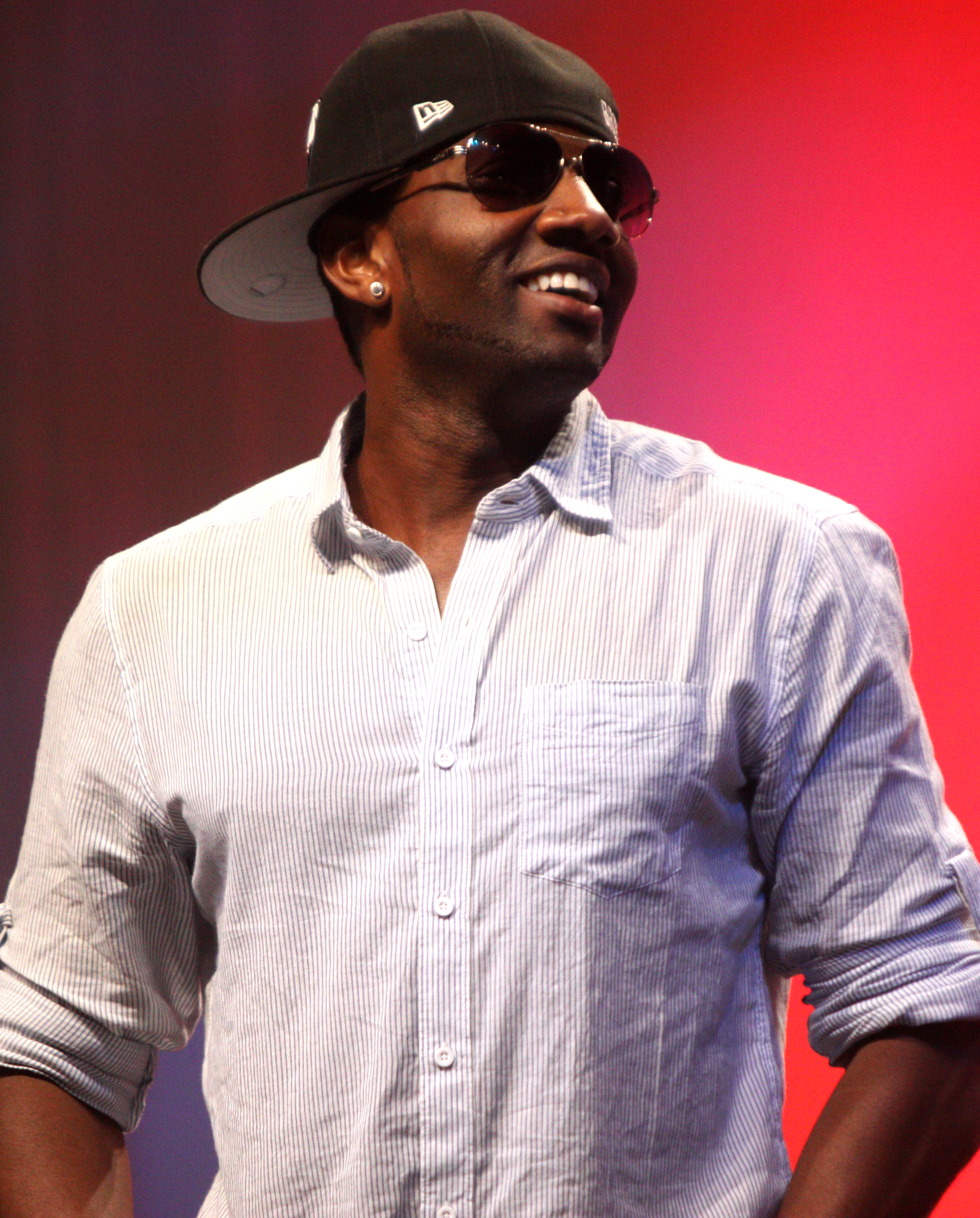
- Power in 2012
- Born: Arlington County, Virginia, U.S.
- Occupations: Internet personality; rapper; actor
- Website: www.thezeusnetwork.com

DeStorm Power (/ˈdeɪstɔːrm/ DAY-storm) is an American musician and Internet personality who began his career on YouTube.

== Life and career ==
The fourth of eight siblings, Power was born in Arlington County, Virginia and raised in Baltimore, Maryland by his mother, who left his father early in his life. Frequently moving schools, he dropped out of school in the ninth grade, and was regularly sent to juvenile detention for various petty crimes before he began dancing and rapping. In 2001, motivated by the birth of his son Tayvion, and the local success of his song "Weed", which featured one of his brothers, Power moved from Baltimore to New York to California to pursue a career in music in 2001, where he spent time homeless before being handed a business card by a talent scout.

After interning and ghostwriting at Atlantic Records, Universal and various other record labels, Power set out to establish himself as a performer, using YouTube as a platform to share his singing, songwriting and production skills with the online community. Power's videos are typically comedic, and also often incorporate rapping and beatboxing. He was an accomplished triple jumper and Master personal trainer, and was notably invited to the Olympic Trials.

Power appeared as Mr. T in the first season of Epic Rap Battles of History from which he achieved a gold record. In 2008 he lost his mother Mashala to stomach cancer. He moved to Los Angeles, California in 2011, where he joined his manager Sara Pena and started Big Frame, a Multi Channel Network and founded Forefront.TV, which focuses on urban lifestyle and music. Power moved on to Paradigm Talent Agency for his acting career, and then William Morris Endeavor, before deciding to go independent. In August 2015, Power hosted the reboot of MTV's Punk'd with co-host King Bach, which aired on BET. He is a founder and president of The Zeus Network which launched July 13, 2018 He is a 2011 American Music Awards honoree and was nominated for seven Streamy Awards, winning four. He was Emmy Nominated for Outstanding Actor in a Short Form Comedy or Drama Series in 2018 for his original creation Caught The Series.

== YouTube career ==
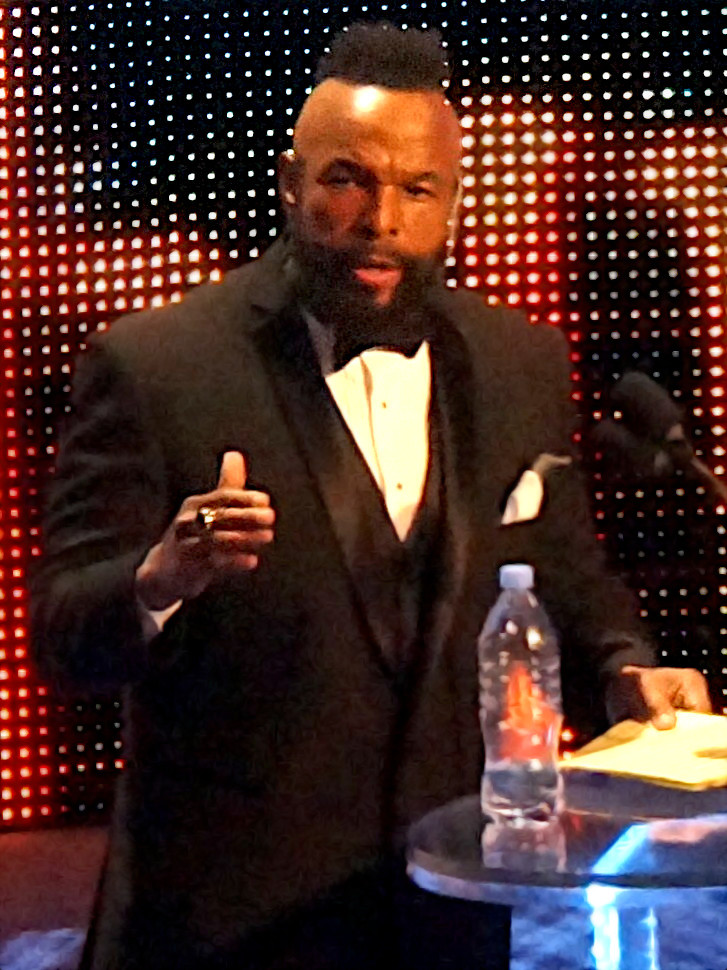
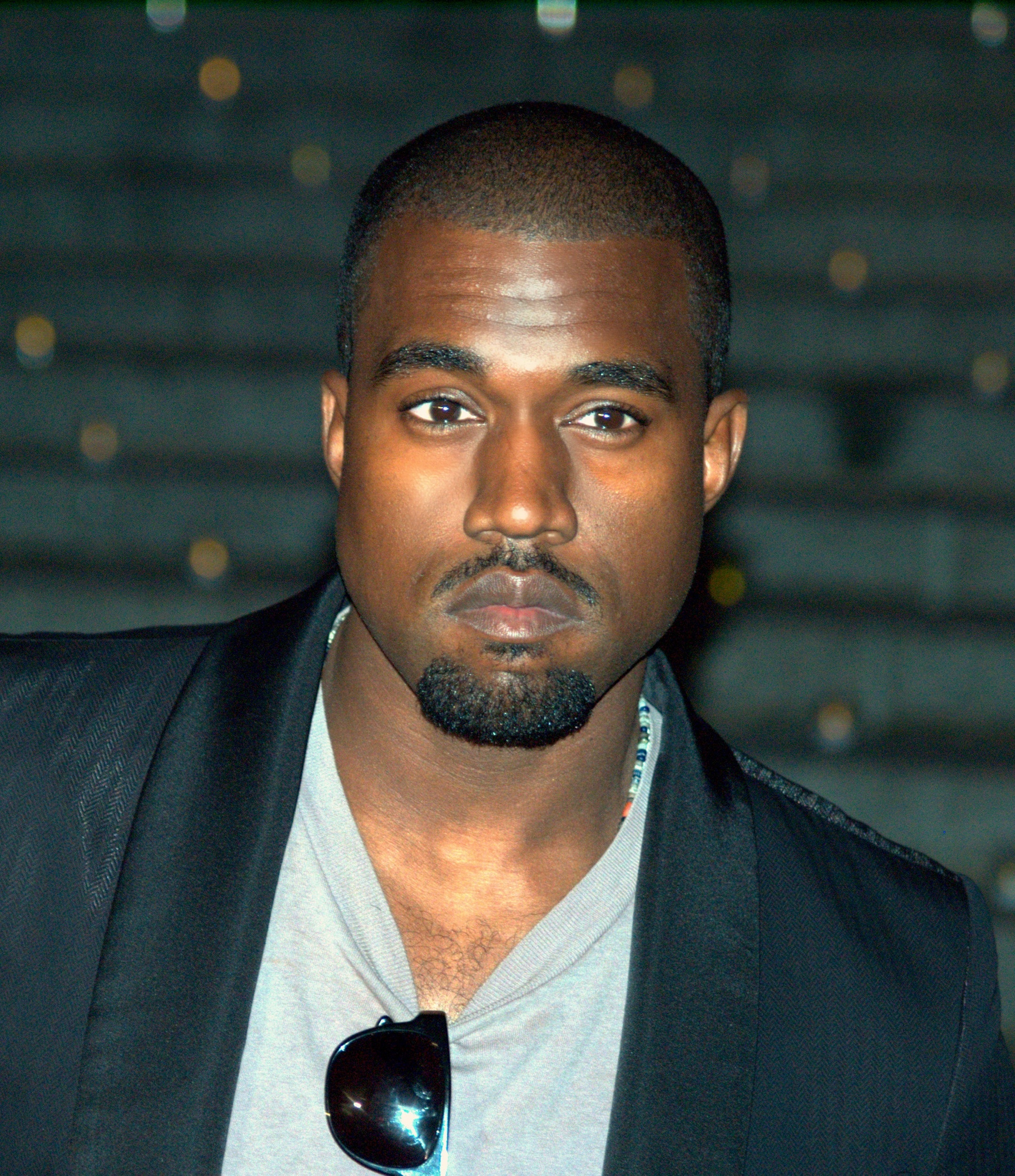
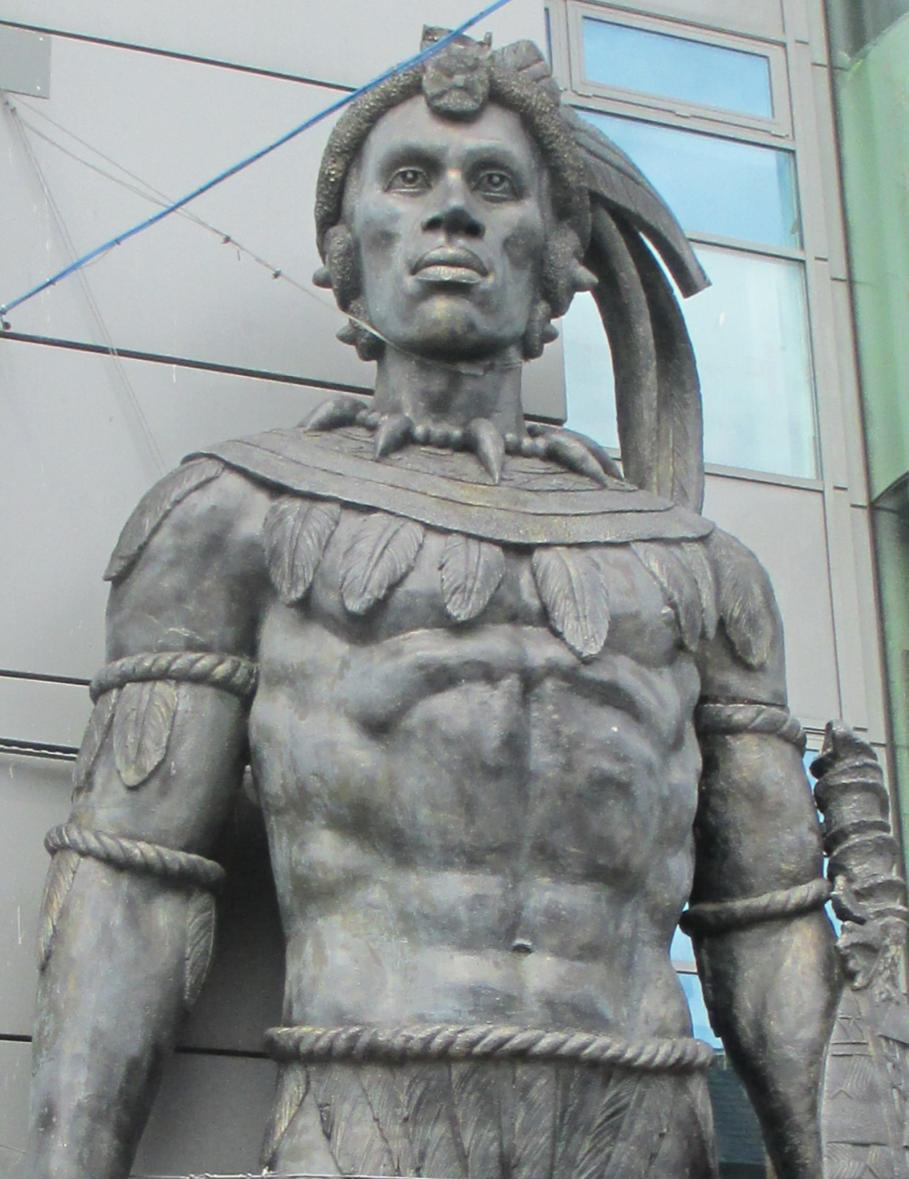
Power has portrayed and rapped as American actor Mr. T (left), American rapper Kanye West (center) and Zulu monarch Shaka (right) for Epic Rap Battles of History.

=== DeStorm Power ===
Power's YouTube channel, registered under the username DeStorm in 2006, has more than 3.06 million subscribers as of November 2022, and it is used primarily for his musical endeavors. The videos on the channel have been viewed over 568 million times. "Wuz Up World? (What's up World?)"—DeStorm's catch phrase—can be heard at the start or end of every video. DeStorm often composes and performs covers or Beatbox covers of well known songs or creates content for major brands such as Pepsi, GE, Yahoo and Nintendo. DeStorm also creates original content based upon subscribers' challenges and suggestions such as rapping in alphabetical order or name dropping various movie titles in a rap.

Power occasionally collaborates with other popular YouTube personalities and recording artists such as Mystery Guitar Man, Freddie Wong, Ray William Johnson, Nice Peter and Kina Grannis. One of Power's most popular series on the channel is Rap Up, which Power began in 2009. Power also competed in a commercial contest hosted by Heinz Ketchup and was a finalist. Despite the success of his YouTube channel, Power announced in 2013 that his next major song release will be televised on MTV.

In April 2013, Power authored an op-ed on New Media Rockstars, detailing his concerns with the broken view counter on his DeStorm channel. He also won two comedy awards. Power was also featured as a headliner on the Digitour in the summer of 2010, in which he and other YouTubers traveled around the country performing their songs from YouTube. In 2014, Power was listed on New Media Rockstars Top 100 Channels, ranked at #85.

=== Caught Series ===
On 9 April 2017, Power started a minute long series on Instagram called Caught. The series later aired on YouTube and Facebook. This involves DeStorm facing problems with his girlfriend, his side-chick, his friends, enemies and others. Every Sunday, this series ends with a cliffhanger. Caught the Series was nominated for an Emmy Award and four Streamy Awards, winning two.

Season 2 launched on July 13, 2018, on The Zeus Network, an SVOD streaming platform founded by DeStorm Power, King Bach, Amanda Cerny and Lemuel Plummer. The series includes celebrities such as Snoop Dogg, King Bach, Lamorne Morris, Alphonso McAuley, Lele Pons, Reedo Brown, Bradley Martin, Leli Hernandez, Janina, Taylor Stevens, Klarity, LianeV and many more.

=== Notable videos and collaborations ===
| Title | Artist | Upload date (YouTube) |
|---|---|---|
| "Refresh the World" | DeStorm Power | August 10, 2010 |
A video song created for the Pepsi Refresh the World Project, currently being aired on MTV, BET, and VHI. The instrumentation was made using solely the sounds created by Pepsi cans, boxes, etc.
| "AMA's SONG" | DeStorm Power | October 3, 2010 |
A video song commissioned specially for the 2010 American Music Awards. In this video, Power raps about the year's nominees.
| "Get Crackin' with Wonderful Pistachios Commercial" | DeStorm Power | October 14, 2009 |
Power's winning submission to the Wonderful Pistachios Get Crackin' contest
| "Tag Your Green!" | DeStorm Power | October 4, 2010 |
A video song for the General Electric Tag Your Green project promoting environmental responsibility.
| "Airplanes – BoB & Hayley Williams of Paramore (Boyce Avenue & DeStorm cover)" | DeStorm Power, Boyce Avenue | January 14, 2011 |
An acoustic cover of the song "Airplanes" by B.o.B with Boyce Avenue.
| "Power Hour – Kanye West Parody" | DeStorm Power, Freddie Wong | August 18, 2010 |
A song and video parody of the song "Power" by Kanye West with Freddie Wong.
| "Making BLING Sexy!" | DeStorm Power, Vassy | August 23, 2010 |
A song and video collaboration with the Australian R&B singer Vassy.
| "Household Jam Session (MysteryGuitarMan and DeStorm)" | DeStorm Power, Joe Penna | November 24, 2009 |
A song and video collaboration with Joe Penna, also known as Mystery Guitar Man, using random household objects.
| "Finally Free ft. Talib Kweli" | DeStorm Power, Talib Kweli | November 28, 2011 |
A rap song with a smooth hook featuring Talib Kweli. This song depicts hardships we come across during our lives and DeStorm making it so far and being finally free.
| "Mr. T vs. Mr. Rogers" | DeStorm Power, Nice Peter | September 14, 2011 |
In the 13th episode of Youtube series Epic Rap Battles of History, Mr. T and Mr. Rogers face each other in a rap battle. DeStorm played Mr. T and series creator Nice Peter played Mr. Rogers.
| "Larry King Challenges DeStorm" | DeStorm Power | August 2, 2012 |
Larry King appeared in a 2012 video where he rapped with DeStorm as a promotion for his new show Larry King Now.
| "Pocket Like It's Hot – Snoop, DeStorm & Andy Milonakis" | Snoop Lion | October 10, 2012 |
A promotion for Hot Pockets featuring Snoop Lion satirizing his classic "Drop It Like It's Hot" with DeStorm Power and Andy Milonakis.
| "Donald Trump vs. Ebenezer Scrooge" | DeStorm Power, Nice Peter | December 19, 2013 |
In the 39th episode of Youtube series Epic Rap Battles of History, Donald Trump and Ebenezer Scrooge face each other in a rap battle. DeStorm cameos as rapper Kanye West.
| "Shaka Zulu vs. Julius Caesar" | DeStorm Power, Nice Peter | July 20, 2015 |
In the 56th episode of Youtube series Epic Rap Battles of History, Shaka Zulu and Julius Caesar face each other in a rap battle. DeStorm played Shaka Zulu and series creator Nice Peter played Julius Caesar.

== Be Careful ==
A mixtape by DeStorm, Be Careful, was released May 1, 2012. Blais, Lone Monk, Christopher Charles, Alex J and Owen Hill Jr. were among the album's producers.

Be Careful

Mixtape by DeStorm
- Released: May 1, 2012
- Genre: Hip Hop
- Length: 48:28
- Label: Big Frame

Singles from Be Careful
- 1. "Finally Free" Released: November 28, 2011; 2. "Love Signs" Released: February 15, 2012

| No. | Title | Length |
|---|---|---|
| 1. | "Champion" | 3:35 |
| 2. | "My Grind" | 3:48 |
| 3. | "3-Minute Workout!" | 3:09 |
| 4. | "Instagram" | 3:12 |
| 5. | "Anything You Want (feat. Christian Caldeira)" | 3:39 |
| 6. | "Baddest Mutha" | 3:37 |
| 7. | "Selfish" | 2:50 |
| 8. | "Love Signs" | 3:29 |
| 9. | "See Me Standing (feat. Alexandra Govere)" | 4:04 |
| 10. | "The Background" | 3:27 |
| 11. | "Hold That Pose" | 3:17 |
| 12. | "Finally Free (feat. Talib Kweli)" | 3:46 |
| 13. | "Protest" | 3:26 |
| 14. | "Watch Me 2012 (feat. Razi)" | 3:46 |
| 15. | "Love All The Way" | 2:36 |

Initially, the album was released in digital and physical CD form. Limited-edition USB keys with the album preloaded onto them were sold soon after release, which were previously only available at a private launch party for the album.

== King Kong ==
A mixtape by DeStorm, King Kong, was released February 3, 2013.

King Kong

Mixtape by DeStorm
- Released: February 3, 2013
- Genre: Hip Hop
- Length: 48:20
- Label: Big Frame

Singles from King Kong
- 1. "King Kong" Released: November 26, 2012

| No. | Title | Length |
|---|---|---|
| 1. | "King Kong" | 3:38 |
| 2. | "Let Em Talk" | 3:31 |
| 3. | "All Right" | 3:02 |
| 4. | "Invincible (ft. Ray William Johnson & Chester See)" | 3:26 |
| 5. | "Dream Bigger" | 3:11 |
| 6. | "Money In My Pocket" | 4:00 |
| 7. | "Scattin' On Me (ft. Kreesha Turner)" | 3:01 |
| 8. | "Pole Position" | 3:38 |
| 9. | "Fuckin' Wit Me (ft. Koowplayy & Kreesha Turner)" | 4:00 |
| 10. | "Cameras (ft. Streetlight, Page Kennedy & Chester See)" | 4:18 |
| 11. | "Cheques" | 2:56 |
| 12. | "Smoking on a J" | 3:15 |
| 13. | "Magic" | 3:46 |
| 14. | "You are a Star (ft. The Arnats)" | 3:18 |

== Caught Series ==
An album by DeStorm, Caught Series, was released August 17, 2017. It is the soundtrack album for his web series, Caught.

Caught Series

Soundtrack album by DeStorm Power
- Released: August 17, 2017
- Genre: Soundtrack
- Length: 21:13
- Label: Wuz Up World Inc.
- Producer: Owen Hill Jr.

| No. | Title | Length |
|---|---|---|
| 1. | "Caught Series, Pt. 1" | 0:57 |
| 2. | "Caught Series, Pt. 2" | 0:58 |
| 3. | "Caught Series, Pt. 3" | 0:57 |
| 4. | "Caught Series, Pt. 4" | 0:56 |
| 5. | "Caught Series, Pt. 5" | 1:00 |
| 6. | "Caught Series, Pt. 6" | 0:58 |
| 7. | "Caught Series, Pt. 7" | 0:58 |
| 8. | "Caught Series, Pt. 8" | 0:58 |
| 9. | "Caught Series, Pt. 9" | 0:58 |
| 10. | "Caught Series, Pt. 10" | 0:59 |
| 11. | "Caught Series, Pt. 11" | 1:02 |
| 12. | "Caught Series, Pt. 12" | 1:10 |
| 13. | "Caught Series, Pt. 13" | 1:00 |
| 14. | "Caught Series, Pt. 14" | 1:01 |
| 15. | "Caught Series, Pt. 15" | 1:10 |
| 16. | "Caught Series, Pt. 16" | 1:10 |
| 17. | "Caught Series, Pt. 17" | 0:58 |
| 18. | "Caught Series, Pt. 18" | 1:10 |
| 19. | "Caught Series, Pt. 19" | 1:13 |
| 20. | "Caught Series, Pt. 20" | 1:40 |

== Awards and nominations ==
| Year | Award | Category | Work | Outcome | Ref |
|---|---|---|---|---|---|
| 2011 | American Music Awards | New Media Honoree (Male) | Himself | Won | |
| 2013 | Streamy Awards | Best Web Musician | DeStorm Power on YouTube Channel | Nominated | |
| 2013 | YouTube Music Awards | Innovation of the Year | "See Me Standing" | Won | |
| 2014 | Streamy Awards | Vine Comedian | "Himself" | Won | |
| 2017 | Streamy Awards | Acting in a Drama | Caught the Series | Won | |
| 2017 | Streamy Awards | Ensemble Cast | Caught the Series | Nominated | |
| 2017 | Streamy Awards | Drama Series | Caught the Series | Nominated | |
| 2017 | Streamy Awards | Writing | Caught the Series | Won | |
| 2018 | Creative Arts Primetime Emmy Award | Outstanding Actor In A Short Form Comedy or Drama Series | Caught the Series | Nominated | |
| 2018 | Streamy Awards | Writing | Caught the Series | Won | |
| 2018 | Streamy Awards | Ensemble Cast | Caught the Series | Nominated | |
| 2018 | Streamy Awards | Drama Series | Caught the Series | Nominated | |
| 2018 | Streamy Awards | Acting in a Drama | Caught the Series | Nominated | |
| 2021 | Streamy Awards | Indie Series | "The Blues" (by DeStorm Power) | Nominated | |
| 2021 | Streamy Awards | Scripted Series | "The Confession Game" (by DeStorm Power) | Nominated | |
