= Caught (web series) =

2017 musical-comedy web series

- Genre: Musical; Comedy; Drama
- Created by: DeStorm Power
- Directed by: DeStorm Power
- Country of origin: United States
- Original language: English
- No. of seasons: 3
- No. of episodes: 34

Production
- Running time: 1–5 minutes

Original release
- Network: Online (Seasons 1 & 3); Zeus Network (Season 2)
- Release: April 9, 2017 – present

Caught (also known as Caught Series, or Caught the Series) is a musical-comedy web series created by DeStorm Power. Beginning in 2017, the first season of the series consists of 20 1-minute videos, telling the story of the aftermath of a man's girlfriend unexpectedly arriving home while his sidechick is in their bed. Released weekly through Instagram, Facebook, and YouTube, the series quickly went viral, amassing millions of views per episode.

The songs from the first season were released as an album, and an 8-episode second season was released in 2018 through the Zeus Network. A 6-episode third season, called Caught Series: Secrets, began in 2023, being released on social media.

The first two seasons secured several Streamy Award nominations in 2017 and 2018, winning in the "Acting in a Drama" category for the first season, and in the "Writing" category both years.

== Production ==
DeStorm Power created Caught as a way of making "something fresh and original for my fanbase." Power was influenced by R. Kelly's Trapped in the Closet series, particularly how the series kept fans' attention for each installment.

== Cast ==
=== Season 1 ===
Main

- DeStorm Power
- King Bach
- Leli Hernandez
- Alicia Gordillo

Recurring

- Taylor Steven – King Bach's Girlfriend
- Melvin Gregg – Latin Gang Member
- Klarity (Greg Davis Jr.) – Jamaican Gang Member
- Alphonso McAuley – Uber Driver
- Lele Pons – Clean Up Man
- LianeV (Liane Valenzuela) – Torturer
- Lamorne Morris – Pastor

=== Season 2 ===
Guests

- Snoop Dogg – Daddy

== Episodes ==
Season	Episodes	Originally released	
Season	Episodes	First released	Last released
1	20	April 9, 2017	August 19, 2017
2	8	July 13, 2018	
3	6	August 22, 2023	September 24, 2023

== Music ==
Caught Series

Soundtrack album by DeStorm Power
- Released: August 17, 2017
- Genre: Soundtrack
- Length: 21:13
- Label: Wuz Up World Inc.
- Producer: Owen Hill Jr.

All of the songs in first season were written and performed by DeStorm Power, and produced by Owen Hill Jr. On August 17, 2017, an album of the first season's songs was released.

== Awards ==
Season 1

Year	Award	Category	Result	Ref.
2017	Streamy Awards	Acting in a Drama	Won	
2017	Streamy Awards	Ensemble Cast	Nominated	
2017	Streamy Awards	Drama Series	Nominated	
2017	Streamy Awards	Writing	Won	
2018	Creative Arts Emmy Awards	Outstanding Actor in a Short Form Comedy or Drama Series	Nominated	

Season 2

Year	Award	Category	Result	Ref.
2018	Streamy Awards	Acting in a Drama	Nominated	
2018	Streamy Awards	Ensemble Cast	Nominated	
2018	Streamy Awards	Drama Series	Nominated	
2018	Streamy Awards	Writing	Won	
