= Dolan Twins =

American comedy duo (born 1999)

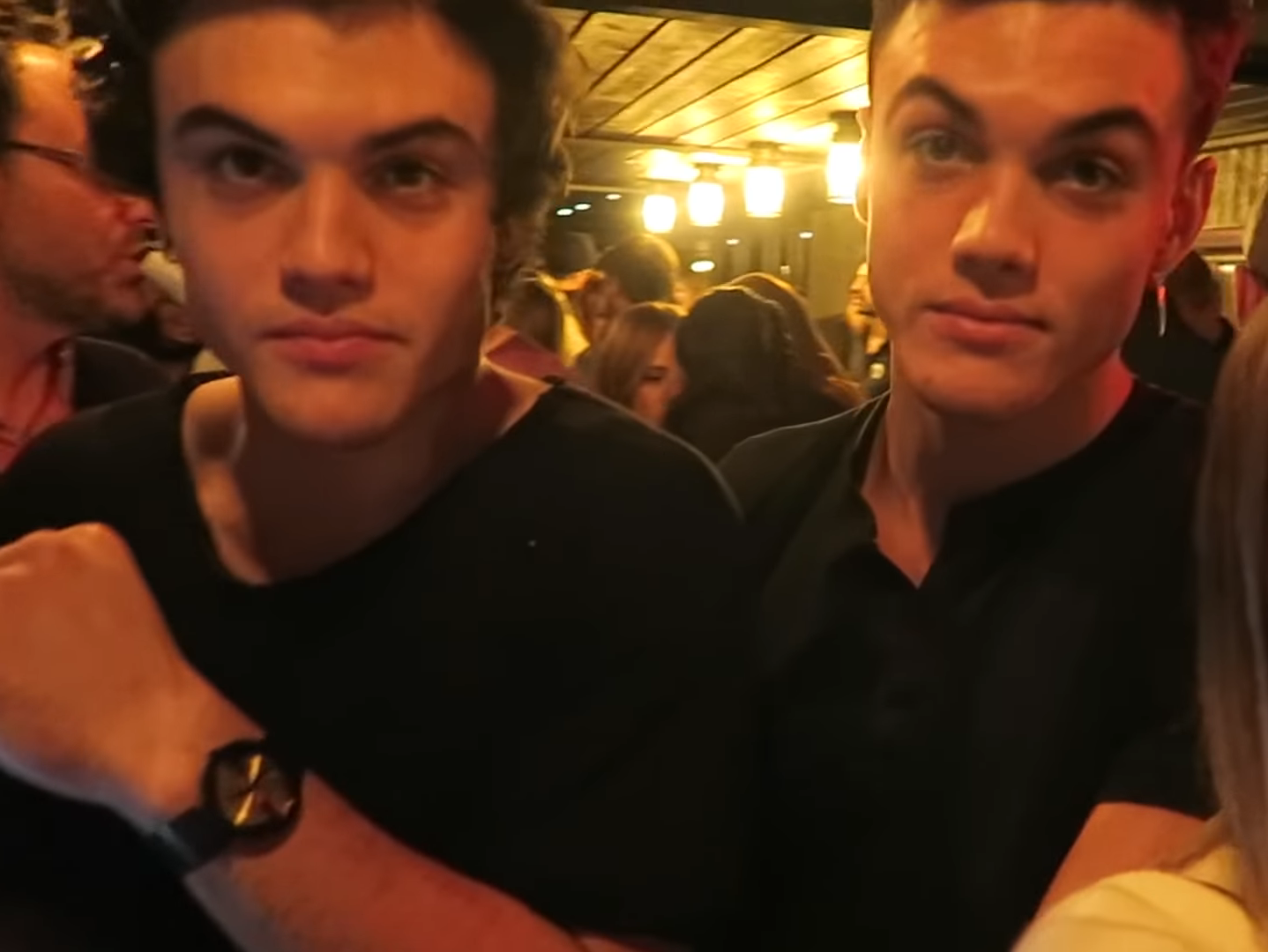
- The Dolan Twins in 2017
- Born: Ethan Dolan; Grayson Dolan; December 16, 1999 (age 26)
- Occupation: Comedian

YouTube information
- Channel: Dolan Twins
- Years active: 2014–2021
- Subscribers: 9.62 million
- Views: 1.89 billion
- Last updated: September 11, 2025

Ethan Dolan and Grayson Dolan (born December 16, 1999), collectively known as the Dolan Twins, are an American comedy duo who rose to prominence in May 2013 on the video sharing application Vine.

== Early life and career ==
The twins are from the Long Valley region of Washington Township, Morris County, New Jersey.

Since their beginnings, the duo has accumulated over 6.4 million followers on Vine and 11 million subscribers on YouTube, and embarked on a world tour titled the "4OU" Tour in 2016. The duo was also involved in a Twitter ad campaign for the social network's new stickers feature. At the 2016 Teen Choice Awards, the duo won the awards for Choice Web Star: Male and Choice YouTuber.

On March 27, 2018, the two announced a hiatus from YouTube through a video on their channel entitled Bye For Now. In the video, they stated that they wanted to re-evaluate themselves creatively and focus on their lives outside of the platform. They later announced their return on May 1, 2018.

In June 2018, the twins formed The Sister Squad with fellow YouTubers James Charles and Emma Chamberlain. The four uploaded simultaneous videos on their YouTube channels on June 19, August 28, October 31, and December 25, 2018, and were featured prominently in YouTube Rewind 2018. The Sister Squad was nominated for a 2019 YouTube Ensemble Shorty Award. The twins were nominated in several Streamy Award categories from 2016 to 2019, winning Creator of the Year at the 7th Streamy Awards.

Their father, Sean Dolan, died from cancer on January 19, 2019. He was fifty years old.

On October 8, 2019, they uploaded a sixty-minute video titled It's Time To Move On.... They explained the stress of their father's death, and that they intend to change the content of their channel and to a more flexible schedule.

On January 14, 2021, they uploaded a podcast titled We're Moving On From YouTube, onto their podcast channel Deeper with the Dolan Twins.

In 2023, they directed the short film Nothing Left to Give, which depicted a farm family grappling with the loss of their mother. The film debuted at the 2023 HollyShorts Film Festival, and was subsequently uploaded to their YouTube channel.

== Work outside of YouTube ==
MTV's Total Request Live reboot added the Dolan Twins to the show's lineup as correspondents, and to provide on-air hosting duties across platforms. It was announced in August 2018 that the twins had directed a music video for the Australian alt-pop group Cub Sport.

In February 2020, the Dolan Twins launched a weekly podcast, Deeper with the Dolan Twins, produced by Cadence13. It lasted until May 2021.

== Awards and nominations ==
Year	Nominated	Award	Result
2016	2016 Teen Choice Awards	Choice Web Star: Male	Won
2016	2016 Teen Choice Awards	Choice YouTuber	Won
2016	6th Streamy Awards	Audience Choice Award for Entertainer of the Year	Nominated
2016	6th Streamy Awards	Breakout Creator	Nominated
2017	2017 Teen Choice Awards	Choice Comedian	Won
2017	2017 Teen Choice Awards	Choice Web Star: Male	Nominated
2017	2017 Teen Choice Awards	Choice YouTuber	Nominated
2017	2017 Teen Choice Awards	Choice Comedy Web Star	Nominated
2017	7th Streamy Awards	Audience Choice Award for Creator of the Year	Won
2017	7th Streamy Awards	First Person	Nominated
2018	2018 Teen Choice Awards	Choice Web Star: Male	Won
2018	2018 Teen Choice Awards	Choice Comedian	Won
2018	8th Streamy Awards	Audience Choice Award for Creator of the Year	Nominated
2018	10th Shorty Awards	Best YouTube Ensemble	Nominated
2019	2019 Teen Choice Awards	Choice Male Web Star	Nominated
2019	2019 Teen Choice Awards	Choice Comedy Web Star	Won
2019	9th Streamy Awards	Collaboration (Shared with Molly Burke)	Nominated
2019	11th Shorty Awards	Best YouTube Ensemble (Shared with Emma Chamberlain and James Charles)	Nominated
