= Laura Lee (YouTuber) =

American YouTuber and make-up artist

- Born: Laura Ann Lee; September 1, 1988 (age 38); Montgomery, Alabama, U.S.
- Occupations: YouTuber; make-up artist
- Spouse: Tyler Williams (m. 2012)

YouTube information
- Channel: laura88lee
- Years active: 2013–present
- Subscribers: 4.58 million
- Views: 818.7 million
- Last updated: 31 August 2026
- Website: lauraleelosangeles.com

Laura Ann Lee (born September 1, 1988) is an American make-up artist, YouTuber, entrepreneur, and blogger.

She began her career as a make-up blogger in 2013 and is the founder and owner of cosmetics brand Laura Lee Los Angeles and the fashion brand Minimla.

== Career ==
Lee first began posting images of her make-up looks on Instagram. She began her YouTube channel in 2013, posting make-up tutorials, hacks, and product reviews. She was named StarCentral Magazine's "Beauty Guru of the Month" in October 2014.

She collaborated with make-up brand Too Faced in 2016. She also collaborated on an eye shadow palette with Violet Voss in June 2016. In April 2017, she helped create her own lipstick shade with MAC Cosmetics. Later that year, she collaborated with Benefit Cosmetics on their Benefit Island Collection, representing the Precisely Brow Pencil.

In September 2017, she appeared on Today to promote her make-up brand, Laura Lee Los Angeles. In October 2017, she released her first eye shadow palette, "Cat's Pajamas", from her brand. Further in April 2018, she released her second eye shadow palette, "Nudie Patootie" along with three liquid lipsticks and an eyeliner.

In August 2018, tweets dating from 2012 were found in which she made racist comments that Lee herself described as "vile and disgusting". Lee was criticized for releasing an apology video that many of her fans deemed insincere. In a one-week span she lost over 300,000 subscribers and several sponsorships. In 2019, Lee posted a video explaining the situation, as well as apologizing for the first video.

In the fall of 2020, Lee launched her second company, Nudie Patootie, a self-funded, contemporary fashion line. The fashion line includes lounge wear, sweaters, earrings, hats, outerwear, dresses, pants, plus size and more. Lee said feedback from her audience inspires the fashion line. For example, her followers requested Nudie Patootie release more loungewear, oversize T-shirts and flannels. There were also requests to offer more plus sizes. Nearly all items in the line sold out on the first day of sales.

== Personal life ==
Lee was born in Montgomery, Alabama. She has two siblings, an older brother and sister. Prior to beginning her YouTube channel, Lee worked as a medical assistant for a dermatologist in Montgomery, Alabama. She has also worked as a preschool teacher. Lee currently resides in Los Angeles with her husband and her niece. She became the legal guardian of her niece Eryn in 2019, whose grandmother had died due to COVID-19 complications, according to Lee two years later.
