= 60 Second Docs =

Web series

- Genre: Documentary series
- Country of origin: United States
- No. of episodes: 500

Production
- Executive producers: Jon Avnet, Rodrigo Garcia, Jake Avnet, Dan Leonard, Emmet McDermott
- Running time: Approximately 1 minute per episode
- Production companies: Indigenous Media; Cannibal Content

Original release
- Release: July 26, 2016 – present

60 Second Docs is a web series produced by Indigenous Media of original, short documentary videos produced and distributed weekly. The series launched on 26 July 2016 with two original videos. In 2019, the series received the Webby Award for Video - Documentary.

The series has been described as "to capture the human experience by highlighting the most interesting and unusual characters on the planet". Some videos garnering a large amount of views are "Areola Tattoos", "Mommy Milk Factory", "DIY Horror Makeup", "Flip-Flop Art", "Autism Car Wash", and "Daddy Daughter Hair School".

The videos were first distributed on Facebook, YouTube, and Vidme, and now distribution channels include Twitter, Instagram , and Snapchat. A partnership announced in April 2019 with Howie Mandel's Alevy Productions brings the series to television.

In 2017, Viacom Velocity made a deal with Indigenous Media for a one-year partnership for content production.

As of April 2019, 60 Second Docs has "produced over 450 documentaries, and generated over 3.5 billion views and 7 million followers".

It was announced in July 2019 that 60 Second Docs will create a monthly series to highlight "human interest stories" from GoFundMe.

== Accolades ==
Year	Award	Category	Result	Ref
2017	Webby Awards	Video - Documentary	Nominated	
2018	Streamy Awards	Documentary	Won (Streamy Award)	
2019	Webby Awards	Culture & Lifestyle (Video)	Won (Webby Award)	
