= List of R5 concert tours =

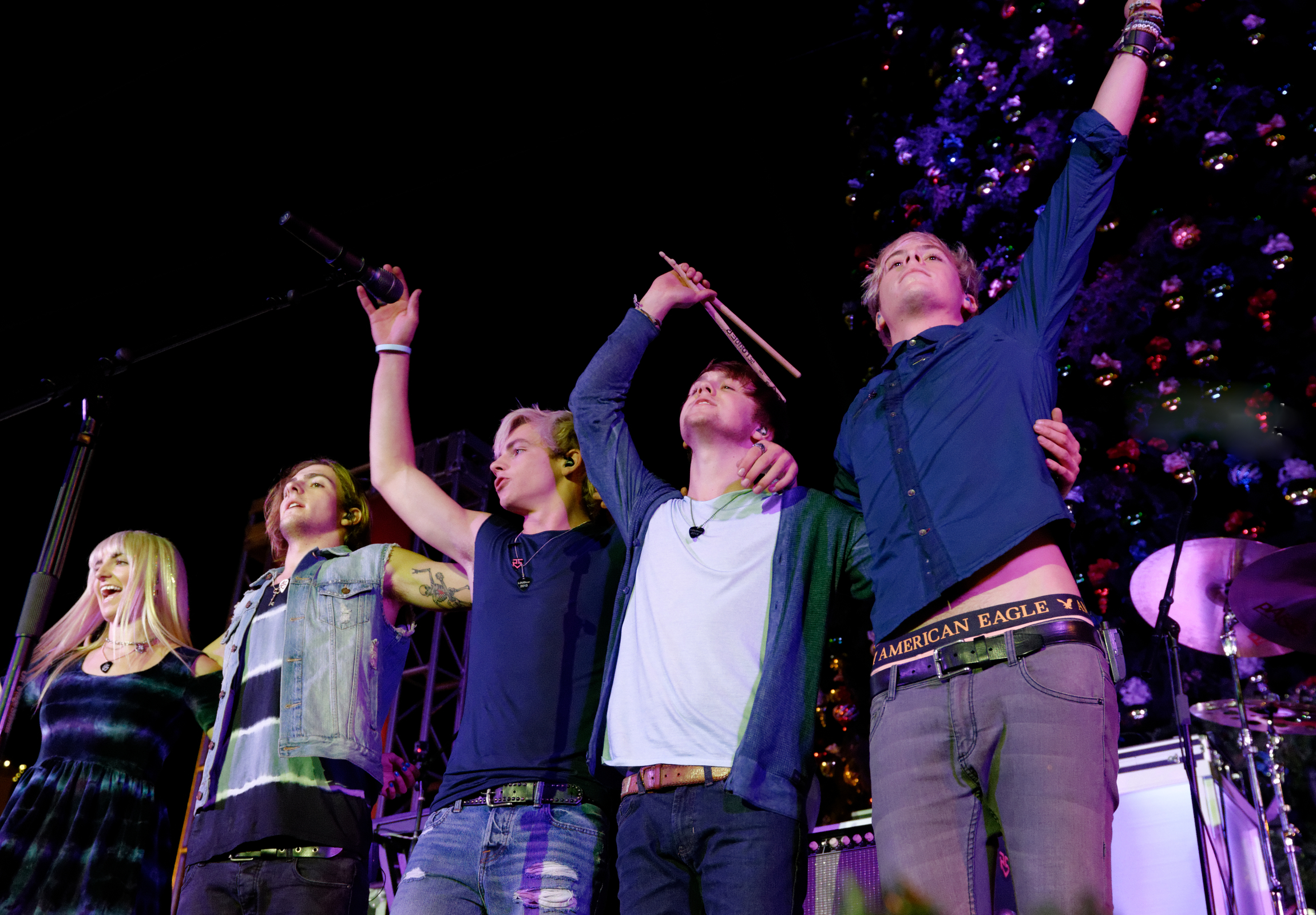
R5 performing in Commerce, in 2013

American pop rock band R5 has embarked on five concert tours, two of which have been worldwide, and two promotional tours. In March 2010, they self-released an EP, Ready Set Rock, and in September released their debut studio album with Hollywood Records. The second EP, Loud, was released on February 19, 2013, which featured the lead single and title track "Loud", the debut single from upcoming album. The band's first full-length album, Louder, was released on September 24, 2013, and the album not only includes the four songs from Loud and also seven new songs. The second single from the album, "Pass Me By", premiered on Radio Disney on August 16. The music video premiered on 29 August on Disney Channel and is available for public viewing on the band's Vevo channel. The third single, "(I Can't) Forget About You", was released on December 25, 2013, and reached number 47 on Billboard Digital Pop Songs, and the fourth single "One Last Dance" on May 29, 2014.

The third extended play, entitled Heart Made Up on You, was released on July 22, 2014, and the self-titled single on August 1, 2014. On November 16, 2014, the band released the first single from second album, "Smile".

== West Coast Tour ==
West Coast Tour
- Tour by R5
- Associated album: Ready Set Rock
- Start date: May 3, 2012
- End date: May 15, 2012
- Legs: 1
- No. of shows: 10 total

R5 concert chronology
- West Coast Tour (2012); East Coast Tour (2012)

West Coast Tour was the debut concert tour by band R5. The tour was supported by Radio Disney and served to promote the band's name with the teen crowd. The tour started on May 3, 2012, and ending on May 15, with 10 dates and traveled only to west coast.

=== Background ===
On April 26, 2012, the band signed a deal with Hollywood Records. The first promotion plan was to send the band to tour in partnership with Radio Disney to promote the band's name to public. Entitled West Coast Tour, the tour started on May 3, 2012, at The Boardwalk in Orangevale, California and ending on May 15, at Slims Club in San Francisco. Altogether the band traveled to ten cities only the west coast. The band played songs from their first extended play Ready Set Rock, released in 2010, some songs from the soundtrack of Austin & Ally, three new songs and the Carly Rae Jepsen's cover version of "Call Me Maybe". During the last live show Ross cut his foot while dropping the microphone.

=== Setlist ===
1. "Double Take"
2. "Take You There"
3. "Cali Girls"
4. "Baby It's You"
5. "Not a Love Song Song"
6. "All About the Girls"
7. "Love to Love Her"
8. "Call Me Maybe"
9. "Wishing I Was 23"
10. "DNA"
11. "What Do I Have To Do"
12. "Heard It On The Radio"
13. "Anything You Want"
14. "Say You'll Stay"
15. "Keep Away From This Girl"
16. "A Billion Hits"

=== Tour dates ===
Date	City	Country	Venue
North America
May 3, 2012	Orangevale	United States	The Boardwalk
May 4, 2012	Bakersfield	United States	Jerry's Pizza
May 5, 2012	Santa Ana	United States	Yost Theater
May 6, 2012	Phoenix	United States	Crescent Ballroom
May 9, 2012	Denver	United States	Bluebird Theater
May 10, 2012	Salt Lake City	United States	Club Sounds
May 11, 2012	Boise	United States	The Venue
May 13, 2012	Seattle	United States	El Corazon
May 14, 2012	Portland	United States	Hawthorne Theatre
May 15, 2012	San Francisco	United States	Slims Club

== East Coast Tour ==
East Coast Tour
- Tour by R5
- Associated album: Ready Set Rock
- Start date: December 15, 2012
- End date: December 31, 2012
- Legs: 1
- No. of shows: 13 total

R5 concert chronology
- West Coast Tour (2012); East Coast Tour (2012); Loud Tour (2013)

East Coast Tour was the second concert tour by band R5. As well as West Coast Tour, the concerts was supported by Radio Disney and served to promote the band's name with the teen crowd. The tour started on December 15, 2012, and ending on December 31.

=== Background ===
On October 19, Ross announced the concert tour and 13 dates in his Twitter. The East Coast Tour started on December 15, 2012, in Jamestown, New York, and ending on December 31 in Syracuse, New York, with 16 dates only to east coast. It was also the first time the band traveled to another country, Canada, to play at Mod Club Theatre. The setlist consisted in songs of their first extended play Ready Set Rock, released in 2010, some songs from the soundtrack of Austin & Ally, The Ting Tings's cover version of "Shut Up and Let Me Go" and the Christmas song "Christmas Is Coming".

To promote the tour the band launched the "Crazy 4 U Contest". The R5' fans sent thematic photos about the song "What Are U Crazy 4?" TO Everloop.com website and the top five have won prizes and five-minute on Skype with the band.

=== Critical reception ===
Lauren Hoffman to Concert Music Magazine was positive and said the members are "a very unique and fun band" and "have definitely made their dent in the music world". She also said that the live performance was energetic, exciting and catchy and mentioned that they were really excited with the public, not just for the money. Hoffman also commented: "Definitely had us leaving wanting more".

=== Opening acts ===
- Brandon and Savannah
- Taylor Mathews

=== Set list ===
1. "Crazy 4 U"
2. "Heartbeat" / "Can't Do It Without You" / "Better Together" / "Not a Love Song"
3. "Heard It on the Radio"
4. "Can You Feel It"
5. "Say You'll Stay
6. "Cali Girls"
7. "Keep Away"
8. "Shut Up and Let Me Go"
9. "What Do I Have to Do?"
10. "Love To Love Her"
11. "Wishing I Was 23"
12. "Take U There"
13. "A Billion Hits"
14. "Christmas Is Coming"

=== Tour dates ===
Date	City	Country	Venue
North America
December 15, 2012	Jamestown	United States	Taping
December 16, 2012	Toronto	Canada	Mod Club Theatre
December 17, 2012	Toronto	Canada	Mod Club Theatre
December 18, 2012	New York City	United States	Highline Ballroom
December 19, 2012	Washington, D.C.	United States	The Filmore
December 21, 2012	Tampa	United States	Capital Theatre
December 22, 2012	Orlando	United States	Plaza Theatre
December 23, 2012	Fort Lauderdale	United States	Culture Room
December 26, 2012	Atlanta	United States	Masquerade
December 28, 2012	Philadelphia	United States	TLA
December 29, 2012	Freehold Township	United States	I Play America
December 30, 2012	Boston	United States	Brighton Music Hall
December 31, 2012	Syracuse	United States	First Night Festival

== Loud Tour ==
Loud Tour
- Tour by R5
- Associated album: Loud
- Start date: March 15, 2013
- End date: August 2, 2013
- Legs: 1
- No. of shows: 46 in North America; 4 in Europe; 50 total

R5 concert chronology
- East Coast Tour (2012); Loud Tour (2013); Louder World Tour (2013–14)

Loud Tour was the third concert tour by band R5 and the first worldwide tour, promoting their second studio EP and debut album with Hollywood Records Loud. This tour also promoted the soundtrack of Austin & Ally. The Tour began on March 15, 2013, in Santa Ana, California and ended on July 5, 2013, in London, England. The tour included 38 dates in the United States, 8 in Canada, 2 in France and 2 in England.

=== Critical reception ===
Brie David to Canadian magazine Faze said was impressed with the crowd screaming for the band. He mentioned the harmony between Ross, Riker and Rocky and said "they could do more than just sing and play an instrument. Throughout the show, the boys showed off their smooth moves while dancing and playing their instruments in sync". David also commented that the group didn't use special effects and their talent prevailed. "This concert was definitely one to remember as R5 showed their true talent without any special effects. The amazing music and friendly people definitely wishing they could go back to this night". Joe Cage to Hit Zone Online said watching the group's concert was an amazing experience to never forget. He said the band was great to escape of the "boyband stereotype" and commented "They did their share to make sure the crowd was having a good time, whether it was getting everyone to clap and sing along, to taking instagram pictures, to "almost" crowd surfing. A great time was had by all".

=== Opening acts ===
- DJ Ryland Lynch (Main dates)
- Taylor Mathews (March 15 – May 14)
- Alex Aiono (March 15-May14)
- Brandon and Savannah (March 15 – March 24 / May 15 – May 19)
- Sunderland (March 30 – April 19)
- Hollywood Ending (April 20 – May 14)

=== Setlist ===
1. "Fallin' for You"
2. "Cali Girls"
3. "Can You Feel It"
4. "I Want You Bad"
5. "Say You'll Stay"
6. "Not a Love Song"
7. "Keep Away From This Girl"
8. "Pour Some Sugar on Me" / "Shut Up and Let Me Go"
9. "Heard It on the Radio"
10. "Wishing I Was 23"
11. "Crazy 4 U"
12. "Here Comes Forever"
13. "A Billion Hits"
14. "Loud"

=== Notes ===
- "Thrift Shop" and "Work Out" were performed in various concerts.
- Def Leppard's "Pour Some Sugar on Me" was performed at Santa Ana, San Diego, Montreal and Vancouver.

=== Tour dates ===
Date	City	Country	Venue
North America
March 15, 2013	Santa Ana	United States	Yost Theater
March 16, 2013	San Diego	United States	Epicenter
March 17, 2013	Phoenix	United States	Celebrity Theatre
March 19, 2013	Salt Lake City	United States	In The Venue
March 20, 2013	Denver	United States	Bluebird Theater
March 22, 2013	Dallas	United States	House of Blues
March 24, 2013	Austin	United States	Stubb's Jr
March 25, 2013	Tulsa	United States	Cain's Ballroom
March 26, 2013	Columbia	United States	The Blue Note
March 28, 2013	Lawrence	United States	Granada Theatre
March 29, 2013	Minneapolis	United States	Mill City Nights
March 30, 2013	Chicago	United States	House of Blues
April 1, 2013	St. Louis	United States	The Firebird
April 2, 2013	Indianapolis	United States	Deluxe at Old National Centre
April 4, 2013	Cleveland	United States	House of Blues
April 5, 2013	Pontiac	United States	Crofoot Ballroom
April 6, 2013	Buffalo	United States	Town Ballroom
April 7, 2013	Allentown	United States	Crocodile Rock Cafe
April 9, 2013	Lancaster	United States	Chameleon Club
April 11, 2013	New York City	United States	Irving Plaza
April 12, 2013	Huntington	United States	Paramount Theatre
April 13, 2013	Richmond	United States	The National
April 14, 2013	Norfolk	United States	The NorVa
April 16, 2013	Charlottesville	United States	Jefferson Theater
April 18, 2013	Cincinnati	United States	20th Century Theatre
April 19, 2013	Nashville	United States	Rocketown
April 20, 2013	Atlanta	United States	Masquerade
April 21, 2013	St. Petersburg	United States	The Palladium
April 23, 2013	Orlando	United States	The Plaza Live
April 25, 2013	Baltimore	United States	Rams Head Live!
April 26, 2013	Philadelphia	United States	Theatre of the Living Arts
April 28, 2013	Freehold	United States	Encore Event Center
April 30, 2013	Clifton Park	United States	Upstate Concert Hall
May 2, 2013	Boston	United States	Paradise Rock Club
May 4, 2013	Montreal	Canada	Corona Theatre
May 5, 2013	Ottawa	Canada	Bronson Centre
May 6, 2013	Hamilton	Canada	Molson Canadian Amphitheater
May 7, 2013	London	Canada	London Music Hall
May 10, 2013	Winnipeg	Canada	The Garrick Centre
May 11, 2013	Saskatoon	Canada	Louis' Pub
May 12, 2013	Edmonton	Canada	Starlite Room
May 14, 2013	Vancouver	Canada	Rio Theatre
May 15, 2013	Seattle	United States	El Corazon
May 16, 2013	Portland	United States	Hawthorne Theatre
May 18, 2013	San Francisco	United States	Great American Music Hall
May 19, 2013	Los Angeles	United States	House of Blues
Europe
June 30, 2013	Paris	France	Nouveau Casino
July 1, 2013	Paris	France	Nouveau Casino
July 3, 2013	London	United Kingdom	Dingwalls
July 5, 2013	London	United Kingdom	Dingwalls
Australia
August 2, 2013	Sydney	Australia	Metro Theatre

== Louder World Tour ==
Louder World Tour
- Tour by R5
- Associated album: Louder
- Start date: December 7, 2013
- End date: June 18, 2014
- Legs: 1
- No. of shows: 2 in Central America; 23 in Europe; 1 in Western Asia; 22 in North America; 48 total

R5 concert chronology
- Loud Tour (2013); Louder World Tour (2013–14); Live on Tour (2014)

Louder World Tour was the fourth concert tour and second worldwide tour by family band R5, promoting their first studio album and debut full-length album with Hollywood Records, Louder. The Tour began on December 7, 2013, in Mexico City and ended on June 14, 2014. The tour includes dates in Western Asia, Europe, Central America, Canada and United States. The tour venues were chosen by R5's fans, as R5 designed an interactive map on R5rocks.com, where fans could vote for where they wanted R5 to perform. During the concert in San Juan, Puerto Rico, the vocalist Ross Lynch record his television film Teen Beach Movie.

=== Critical reception ===
Celeb Secrets 4 U called the show "different and amazing". He also said that the songs are "catchy and upbeat" and cited as highlights "(I Can't) Forget About You", "I Want U Bad", "What Do I Have To Do" and Prince's cover "Let's Go Crazy". Jenny Williams to Light Out said the live performance on the tour is exciting and energizing and "awareness of modern popular references, full of bright and cheery tracks with strong, unforgettable hooks". She also commented that "Ain't No Way" and "If I Can't Be With You" had great performances.

Adrii Cortés to El Nuevo Dia said the band has evolved compared to previous tours and was more rock and roll and the concert was great. Joshua Betancourt Ruiz to Akistoi made a mixed critical about Puerto Rico concert. He said the band arrived 1h30 late, the concert had technical problems and had no effect and original stage as in the United States. But he also said the band was' catchy and had energy and adrenaline.

=== Broadcast and recordings ===
On February 28, 2014, Ross announced that the band would record the London concert, on March 4, 2014, on The O2, during their European leg. He said "We are gonna film our show in London on Tuesday! Who wants some camera time?". They planned to launch a concert movie, but it never happened. On 25 April 2014 the band released the first tour live video, the OneRepublic's cover "Counting Stars", featured the British band The Vamps. Weekly, another five videos were released: "(I Can't) Forget About You", on May 1, "Ain't No Way We're Goin' Home", on May 8, "Loud", on May 16, "Pass Me By", on May 22, and "One Last Dance, on May 29. They also released an extended play, Live in London, with the six songs.

=== Opening acts ===
- DJ Ryland Lynch (Europe and Asia)
- Brandon and Savannah (North America, United Kingdom and Ireland)

=== Setlist ===
1. "Girls"
2. "(I Can't) Forget About You"
3. "Here Comes Forever"
4. "Fallin' For You"
5. "Pass Me By"
6. "Wishing I Was 23"
7. "Love Me Again"
8. "What Do I Have To Do?" / "Valerie"
9. "A Billion Hits"
10. "If I Can't Be With You"
11. "Love Me Like That"
12. "One Last Dance"
13. "Counting Stars"
14. "I Want U Bad"
15. "Cali Girls"
16. "Ain't No Way We're Goin' Home"
17. "Loud"

=== Notes ===
- "Shut Up and Let Me Go" and "Let's Go Crazy" were performed on select dates.
- The band performed Neon Trees' "Sleeping with a Friend" in Amsterdam and Munich.

=== Tour dates ===
Date	City	Country	Venue
North America
January 4, 2014	San Juan	Puerto Rico	José Miguel Agrelot Coliseum
January 5, 2014	Santo Domingo	Dominican Republic	Teatro Nacional
Eurasia
February 5, 2014	Warsaw	Poland	Proxima
February 8, 2014	Tel Aviv	Israel	Theater Club
February 10, 2014	Oslo	Norway	Parkteatret
February 11, 2014	Stockholm	Sweden	Fryshuset Klubben
February 12, 2014	Copenhagen	Denmark	Vega Small Hall
February 13, 2014	Berlin	Germany	Kesselhaus
February 15, 2014	Mannheim	Germany	Alte Seilerei
February 16, 2014	Hamburg	Germany	Knust
February 17, 2014	Cologne	Germany	Gloria
February 19, 2014	Antwerp	Belgium	Arenberg
February 20, 2014	Amsterdam	Netherlands	Melkweg
February 22, 2014	Munich	Germany	Backstage
February 23, 2014	Milan	Italy	Magazzini
February 25, 2014	Barcelona	Spain	Bikini
February 26, 2014	Madrid	Spain	Shoko Live
February 28, 2014	Paris	France	La Cigale
March 3, 2014	Birmingham	United Kingdom	Library
March 4, 2014	London	United Kingdom	Indig02
March 5, 2014	Manchester	United Kingdom	Club Academy
March 6, 2014	Glasgow	United Kingdom	ABC 02
March 8, 2014	Dublin	Ireland	Vicar Street
North America
April 2, 2014	Montreal	Canada	Metropolis
April 3, 2014	Ottawa	Canada	Canadian Tire Centre
April 4, 2014	Kingston	Canada	Rogers K-Rock Centre
April 5, 2014	London	Canada	Budweiser Gardens
April 7, 2014	Hamilton	Canada	Copps Coliseum
April 8, 2014	Oshawa	Canada	General Motors Centre
April 12, 2014	Winnipeg	Canada	Burton Cummings Theatre
April 13, 2014	Saskatoon	Canada	Odeon Events Centre
April 14, 2014	Calgary	Canada	Jack Singer Concert Hall
April 15, 2014	Edmonton	Canada	Northern Alberta Jubilee Auditorium
April 17, 2014	Vancouver	Canada	Queen Elizabeth Theatre
May 23, 2014	Norfolk	United States	The Norva
May 24, 2014	Richmond	United States	The National
May 25, 2014	Jackson	United States	Six Flags Great Adventure
May 27, 2014	Nashville	United States	Rocketown
May 28, 2014	Columbus	United States	Newport Music Hall
May 29, 2014	Pittsburgh	United States	Stage AE
May 30, 2014	Philadelphia	United States	Mann Center
June 4, 2014	Cleveland	United States	House of Blues
June 6, 2014	York	United States	Pullo Center
May 4, 2014	Cleveland	United States	House of Blues
June 10, 2014	New York City	United States	Best Buy Theater
May 8, 2014	Uncasville	United States	Mohegan Sun Arena
May 8, 2014	Wappingers Falls	United States	Dutchess Stadium
May 7, 2014	Saratoga Springs	United States	Saratoga Performing Arts Center
Europe
June 14, 2014	Lisbon	Portugal	Coliseu dos Recreios
June 15, 2014	Braga	Portugal	Theatre Circo
June 18, 2014	London	United Kingdom	O2 Academy Islington

== Live on Tour ==
Live on Tour
- Tour by R5
- Associated album: Heart Made Up on You
- Start date: September 3, 2014
- End date: November 28, 2014
- Legs: 1
- No. of shows: 24 in North America; 4 in South America; 28 total

R5 concert chronology
- Louder World Tour (2013–14); Live on Tour (2014); Sometime Last Night Tour (2015–2016)

Live on Tour was the fifth concert tour by band R5. The tour served to promote the extended play Heart Made Up on You and songs of album Louder with 24 dates in North America. They also traveled for the first time to South America for 4 concerts. It was started on September 3, 2014, and ending on November 28.

=== Background ===
On June 10, 2014, the band announced their new concert tour during a live chat in their website. Ross revealed on his Twitter the first 19 cities and said "Had crazy fun on the first leg of the US tour these past 2 and half weeks!! Can't wait to do it again in September". The tickets went for pre-sale on June 10 on the R5's website and for official sale on June 13. To promote the tour the band appeared in some television programs as The Ellen DeGeneres Show, Good Morning America and Live! with Kelly and Michael.

=== Concert synopsis ===
The setlist consists mainly to promote the songs released on the extended play Heart Made Up on You, some songs from Louder and five cover versions: "Let's Go Crazy" by Prince, "Drunk in Love" by Beyoncé, "Valerie" by Amy Winehouse and "Seven Nation Army" by The White Stripes. An additional date has been announced on September 29, 2014, at Gramercy Theatre, in New York City. The event was a partnership with Yahoo!, entitled "R5 for $5", selling special tickets for $5 for the fans. To promote the event the band held a live chat answering questions. Later other nine dates were announced, including four in South America, two in Brazil and two in Argentina, the first time the band toured in South. They also released a video-diary series about the tour on their official channel.

During the first concert, Ross was sick and they had difficulties in the performances. In an interview with The Magazine, Ross told talked about it: "The first bit started off a little slower because I was a little sick, well for me personally. There is always something nice about being sick on the road because you can always look forward to getting better. The tour keeps getting better and better. Every night we will look at our show and look at the weakest section, and we’ll fix it and make it better. As the tour goes on, it gets better. We like to change it up too. Change the set".

=== Critical reception ===
The UOL was positive and said the band does not need special effects and a great production to be exciting. He also said that the R5 flees the teen stereotype and plays rock and roll and would be a great choice for the festival Rock in Rio. Leticia Annes to Teen said the concert focus was on members and their voices were perfect live. The G1 News compared the band to 5 Seconds of Summer and The Vamps and said they were dynamic live.

=== Opening acts ===
- DJ Ryland Lynch (Main dates)
- Brandon and Savannah (Main dates)
- Jessarae (only in Westbury)

=== Setlist ===
1. "Let's Go Crazy"
2. "(I Can't) Forget About You"
3. "Easy Love"
4. "If I Can't Be With You"
5. "Pass Me By"
6. "Ain't no Way We're Goin' Home"
7. "Things Are Looking Up"
8. "Drunk in Love" / "What Do I Have To Do" / "Valerie"
9. "Love Me Like That"
10. "One Last Dance"
11. "Seven Nation Army"
12. "I Want U Bad"
13. "Cali Girls"
14. "Stay With Me"
15. "Loud"
16. "Heart Made Up on You"

=== Notes ===
- "Say You'll Stay" was performed during the second Argentina concert.
- "Smile" was added to the set list on November 25.

=== Tour dates ===
Date	City	Country	Venue
North America
September 3, 2014	Orlando	United States	Hard Rock Cafe
September 5, 2014	Memph	United States	Agricenter Farmer's Market
September 6, 2014	Atlanta	United States	Cobb Energy Performing Arts Centre
September 7, 2014	Charlotte	United States	Amos' Southland
September 8, 2014	Baltimore	United States	Rams Head Live!
September 11, 2014	Salt Lake City	United States	Sandy City Amphitheatre
September 12, 2014	Las Vegas	United States	Henderson Pavilion
September 14, 2014	San Francisco	United States	The Regency Center
September 16, 2014	Denver	United States	Ogden Theatre
September 18, 2014	Minneapolis	United States	Mill City Nights Club
September 19, 2014	Chicago	United States	Rosemont Theatre
September 20, 2014	Milwaukee	United States	Pabst Theater
September 21, 2014	Detroit	United States	Royal Oak Music Theatre
September 23, 2014	Toronto	Canada	Sony Centre for the Performing Arts
September 25, 2014	Youngstown	United States	Stambaugh Auditorium
September 26, 2014	Sayreville	United States	Starland Ballroom
September 27, 2014	Ledyard	United States	Foxwoods Casino
September 28, 2014	Lowell	United States	Lowell Memorial Auditorium
September 29, 2014	New York City	United States	Gramercy Theatre
October 2, 2014	Toronto	Canada	Air Canada Centre
South America
October 4, 2014	São Paulo	Brazil	Citibank Hall
October 5, 2014	Rio de Janeiro	Brazil	Citibank Hall Rio
October 7, 2014	Buenos Aires	Argentina	Teatro Opera
October 8, 2014	Buenos Aires	Argentina	Teatro Opera
North America
October 11, 2014	Fresno	United States	Paul Paul Theatre
November 25, 2014	Wilmington	United States	Stambaugh Auditorium
November 26, 2014	Reading	United States	Santander Performing Arts Center
November 28, 2014	Westbury	United States	The Space at Westbury

=== Box office data ===
Venue	City	Tickets sold / available
Citibank Hall	São Paulo	7,000 / 7,000 (100%)

== Sometime Last Night Tour ==
Sometime Last Night Tour
- Tour by R5
- Associated album: Sometime Last Night
- Start date: June 28, 2015
- End date: December 14, 2016
- No. of shows: 76 in North America; 28 in Europe; 13 in South America; 2 in Central America; 5 in Asia; 4 in Oceania; 128 total

R5 concert chronology
- Live on Tour (2014); Sometime Last Night Tour (2015–2016); New Addictions Tour (2017–2018)

Sometime Last Night Tour is the sixth concert tour by band R5. The tour was announced on April 6, 2015, together with premiere of music video for second song Let's Not Be Alone Tonight and began in Hershey, Pennsylvania on June 30, 2015.

=== Background ===
The United States leg of the tour was announced on April 6, 2015, together with premiere of music video for second song Let's Not Be Alone Tonight from band's upcoming sophomore studio album which release date, July 10, 2015, was also announced. European leg of the tour was announced on June 5, 2015, during band's livestream. The Japanese leg of the tour was announced on October 14, 2015. The South American leg of the tour was announced on October 16, 2015, on Twitter. Shows in Australia and New Zealand were announced on October 22, 2015, on Twitter.

=== Opening act ===
- DJ Ryland Lynch (Main dates)
- Jacob Whitesides (North America: July 8 – August 14, 2015)
- Jack & Jack (Australia and New Zealand)
- At Sunset (Australia and New Zealand)
- Parade of Lights (North America: January 26 – February 24, 2016)
- Max Schneider (North America: February 26 – March 17, 2016)

=== Setlist ===
US and Europe

1. "All Night"
2. "Heart Made up on You"
3. "Let's Not Be Alone Tonight"
4. "Dark Side"
5. "Cali Girls"
6. "Easy Love"
7. "Loud"
8. "I Know You Got Away"
9. "I Want U Bad"
10. "Let's Go Crazy"
11. "Lightning Strikes"
12. "You and I"
13. "F.E.E.L. G.O.O.D."
14. "Repeating Days"
15. "Did You Have Your Fun?"
16. "(I Can't) Forget About You"
17. "Wild Hearts"
18. "Ain't No Way We're Goin' Home"
19. "Smile"

South America

1. "Heart Made Up On You"
2. "Let's Not Be Alone Tonight"
3. "Dark Side"
4. "Cali Girls"
5. "Easy Love"
6. "All Night"
7. "I Know You Got Away"
8. "Repeating Days"
9. "Lightning Strikes"
10. "Pass Me By"
11. "Loud"
12. "F.E.E.L.G.O.O.D"
13. "Did You Have Your Fun?"
14. "I Can't Say I'm In Love"
15. "(I Can't) Forget About You"
16. "Wild Hearts"
17. "All This Things That I've Done" (cover)
18. "Smile"

Asia

1. "F.E.E.L.G.O.O.D
2. "Dark Side"
3. "Did You Have Your Fun?"
4. "Easy Love"
5. "Cali Girls"
6. "Let's Not Be Alone Tonight"
7. "If I Can't Be With You"
8. "I Know You Got Away"
9. "Repeating Days"
10. "Lightning Strikes"
11. "Pass Me By Unplugged"
12. "Loud Unplugged"
13. "All Night"
14. "Heart Made Up On You"
15. "(I Can't) Forget About You"
16. "Wild Hearts"
17. "Last Nite"
18. "Smile"
- In Sterling Heights, the band performed "I Can't Say I'm In Love" for the first time.
- They recorded the show of Los Angeles and released in DVD, entitled Live at the Greek Theatre, on March 11, 2016.
- In Buenos Aires, the band performed "Seven Nation Army" and "Let's Go Crazy".
- In Mendoza, the band performed "One Last Dance".

=== Tour dates ===
Date	City	Country	Venue
North America
April 19, 2015	Tucson	United States	Pima County Fair
March 4, 2015	West Hollywood	United States	Roxy Theatre
May 30, 2015	Buffalo	United States	Canalside
May 31, 2015	Scranton	United States	The Pavilion
June 13, 2015	Wantagh	United States	Jones Beach Theater
June 20, 2015	Bridgeview	United States	Toyota Park
June 28, 2015	Hershey	United States	Hersheypark Stadium
June 30, 2015	St. John's	Canada	Mile One Center
July 1, 2015	Moncton	Canada	Casino New Brunswick
July 4, 2015	Nassau	Bahamas	Atlantis Bahamas
July 7, 2015	Orange Park	United States	Thrasher-Horne Center for the Arts
July 8, 2015	Boca Raton	United States	Mizner Park Amphitheater
July 10, 2015	Alpharetta	United States	Verizon Wireless Amphitheatre at Encore Park
July 11, 2015	Raleigh	United States	Raleigh Memorial Auditorium
July 12, 2015	Vienna	United States	Filene Center
July 14, 2015	Ledyard	United States	Grand Theater
July 16, 2015	Gilford	United States	Bank of New Hampshire Pavilion
July 17, 2015	Boston	United States	House of Blues
July 18, 2015	West Windsor Township	United States	Mercer County Park Festival Grounds
July 20, 2015	Pittsburgh	United States	Stage AE
July 21, 2015	Kettering	United States	Fraze Pavilion
July 22, 2015	Sterling Heights	United States	Freedom Hill Amphitheatre
July 24, 2015	Milwaukee	United States	Riverside Theater
July 25, 2015	St. Charles	United States	Family Arena
July 26, 2015	Kansas City	United States	Arvest Bank Theatre
July 28, 2015	Bloomington	United States	U.S. Cellular Coliseum
July 29, 2015	Louisville	United States	Iroquois Amphitheater
July 30, 2015	Whites Creek	United States	Carl Black Chevy Woods Amphitheater
August 1, 2015^{[A]}	Oklahoma City	United States	Starlight Amphitheater
August 2, 2015	Grand Prairie	United States	Verizon Theatre at Grand Prairie
August 4, 2015	Houston	United States	Bayou Music Center
August 5, 2015	New Braunfels	United States	WhiteWater Amphitheater
August 8, 2015^{[B]}	Denver	United States	Elitch Arena
August 11, 2015	West Valley City	United States	Maverik Center
August 12, 2015	Boise	United States	Morrison Center for the Performing Arts
August 14, 2015^{[C]}	Redmond	United States	Marymoor Park Outdoor Venue
August 15, 2015	Eugene	United States	Cuthbert Amphitheater
August 18, 2015	San Jose	United States	City National Civic
August 20, 2015	Henderson	United States	Henderson Pavilion
August 22, 2015	Mesa	United States	Mesa Amphitheatre
August 23, 2015	Los Angeles	United States	Greek Theatre
September 1, 2015^{[D]}	Falcon Heights	United States	Minnesota State Fair Grandstand
September 3, 2015	Philadelphia	United States	Mann Center for the Performing Arts
September 4, 2015^{[E]}	Timonium	United States	Timonium Race Track Infield
September 5, 2015	Huntington	United States	Paramount Theatre
September 6, 2015^{[F]}	Syracuse	United States	Chevy Court
Europe
September 10, 2015	Lisbon	Portugal	Coliseu dos Recreios
September 11, 2015	Porto	Portugal	Coliseu do Porto
September 12, 2015	Madrid	Spain	Palacio Vistalegre
September 13, 2015	Barcelona	Spain	Razzmatazz
September 16, 2015	Marseille	France	Espace Julien
September 17, 2015	Rome	Italy	Orion Live Club
September 20, 2015	Milan	Italy	Alcatraz
September 22, 2015	Vienna	Austria	Ottakringer Brauerei
September 23, 2015	Munich	Germany	Technikum
September 24, 2015	Mannheim	Germany	Alte Seilerei
September 26, 2015	Paris	France	Paris Olympia
September 27, 2015	Zürich	Switzerland	X-tra
September 29, 2015	Prague	Czech Republic	Lucerna Music Bar
September 30, 2015	Warsaw	Poland	Klub Palladium
October 3, 2015	Copenhagen	Denmark	Vega
October 4, 2015	Stockholm	Sweden	Klubben
October 5, 2015	Oslo	Norway	Vulkan Arena
October 8, 2015	Antwerp	Belgium	Stadsschouwburg Antwerpen
October 9, 2015	Amsterdam	Netherlands	Melkweg
October 11, 2015	Birmingham	United Kingdom	O2 Academy Birmingham
October 13, 2015	London	United Kingdom	O_{2} Shepherd's Bush Empire
October 14, 2015	Oxford	United Kingdom	O2 Academy Oxford
October 15, 2015	Glasgow	United Kingdom	O2 ABC Glasgow
October 18, 2015	Manchester	United Kingdom	Manchester Academy
October 19, 2015	Leeds	United Kingdom	Mine
October 22, 2015	Dublin	Ireland	Vicar Street
South America
November 29, 2015	Bogotá	Colombia	Royal Center
December 1, 2015	Lima	Peru	Anfiteatro del Parque de la Exposición
December 3, 2015	Buenos Aires	Argentina	Luna Park
December 5, 2015	Mendoza	Argentina	Arena Maipu
December 6, 2015	Córdoba	Argentina	Plaza de la musica
December 8, 2015	Rosario	Argentina	Metropolitano
December 10, 2015	Montevideo	Uruguay	Teatro de verano
December 12, 2015	Rio de Janeiro	Brazil	Vivo Rio
December 13, 2015	São Paulo	Brazil	Espaço das Américas
December 15, 2015	Asunción	Paraguay	Yacht club
December 17, 2015	Santiago	Chile	Theatro cariola (4PM show)
December 17, 2015	Santiago	Chile	Theatro cariola (7PM Show)
North America
December 29, 2015	Las Vegas	United States	The Venetian Theatre
December 31, 2015	Las Vegas	United States	The Venetian Theatre
January 1, 2016	Las Vegas	United States	The Venetian Theatre
Asia
January 12, 2016	Tokyo	Japan	Liquid Room
January 13, 2016	Tokyo	Japan	Liquid Room
January 14, 2016	Tokyo	Japan	Akasaka blitz
Oceania
January 17, 2016	Sydney	Australia	Big Top Sydney
January 19, 2016	Melbourne	Australia	Palais Theatre
January 20, 2016	Brendale	Australia	Eaton Hills Hotel
January 22, 2016	Auckland	New Zealand	Logan Campbell Centre
North America
January 26, 2016	Stockton	United States	Bob Hope Theatre
January 27, 2016	Pomona	United States	Fox Theatre Pomona
January 29, 2016	Fresno	United States	Saroyan Theatre
January 30, 2016	San Diego	United States	Balboa Theatre
February 1, 2016	Tucson	United States	Tucson Music Hall
February 2, 2016	Albuquerque	United States	Kiva Auditorium
February 4, 2016	San Antonio	United States	Majestic Theatre
February 6, 2016	Austin	United States	Paramount Theatre
February 9, 2016	Memphis	United States	Cannon Center for the Performing Arts
February 10, 2016	Birmingham	United States	Iron City
February 12, 2016	Orlando	United States	Walt Disney Theater
February 13, 2016	Clearwater	United States	Ruth Eckerd Hall
February 16, 2016	Augusta	United States	Bell Auditorium
February 17, 2016	Knoxville	United States	Knoxville Civic Auditorium
February 18, 2016	Charlotte	United States	Ovens Auditorium
February 20, 2016	Norfolk	United States	Norva Theatre
February 21, 2016	Richmond	United States	National Theater
February 23, 2016	Washington, D.C.	United States	Lincoln Theatre
February 24, 2016	Red Bank	United States	Count Basie Theatre
February 26, 2016	Portland	United States	State Theatre
February 27, 2016	New York City	United States	Beacon Theatre
March 1, 2016	Providence	United States	Veterans Memorial Auditorium
March 2, 2016	Burlington	United States	Flynn Center for the Performing Arts
March 4, 2016	Albany	United States	Palace Theatre
March 5, 2016	Rochester	United States	Auditorium Theatre
March 7, 2016	Reading	United States	Santander Performing Arts Center
March 8, 2016	Cleveland	United States	State Theatre
March 10, 2016	Chicago	United States	Chicago Theatre
March 11, 2016	Minneapolis	United States	State Theatre
March 12, 2016	Des Moines	United States	Civic Center of Greater Des Moines
March 14, 2016	Omaha	United States	Holland Performing Arts Center
March 15, 2016	Tulsa	United States	Brady Theater
March 17, 2016	Sioux City	United States	Orpheum Theatre
July 2, 2016	Baton Rouge	United States	Blue Bayou and Dixie Landin'
Central America
July 9, 2016	Kingston	Jamaica	National Stadium
September 11, 2016	San Juan	Puerto Rico	José Miguel Agrelot Coliseum
Asia
August 20, 2016	Chiba	Japan	Summer Sonic Festival
August 21, 2016	Osaka	Japan	Summer Sonic Festival
South America
December 14, 2016	São Paulo	Brazil	Áudio Club

Festivals and other miscellaneous performances

^{A} Frontier City Summer Concert Series
^{B} Elitch Gardens Summer Concert Series
^{C} Marymoor Park Concert Series
^{D} Minnesota State Fair
^{E} Maryland State Fair
^{F} Great New York State Fair

=== Cancelled dates ===
Date	City	Country	Venue	Reason
October 1, 2015	Leipzig	Germany	Theater-Fabrik-Sachsen	Blizzard in the city

== New Addictions Tour ==
New Addictions Tour
- Tour by R5
- Associated album: New Addictions
- Start date: June 17, 2017
- End date: January 25, 2018
- Legs: 1
- No. of shows: 27 in North America; 28 in Europe; 4 in South America; 2 in Asia; 61 total

R5 concert chronology
- Sometime Last Night Tour (2015–2016); New Addiction Tour (2017–2018)

New Addictions Tour is the seventh and final concert tour by American band R5. The tour was announced along with the release of their new EP "New Addictions" on May 12, 2017. The tour began on June 17, 2017, and ended on January 25, 2018.

=== Opening act ===
- DJ Ryland Lynch
- Jorge Blanco (Europe: September 24 – October 22)
- Lucas Nord.

=== Setlist ===
1. "If"
2. "Need You Tonight"
3. "Easy Love"
4. "All Night"
5. "(I Can't) Forget About You"
6. "F.E.E.L.G.O.O.D"
7. "Dark Side"
8. "I Want U Bad"
9. "Trading Time"
10. "Repeating Days"
11. "Do It Again"
12. "Loud"
13. "Waiting on the World to Change"
14. "Heart Made Up on You"
15. "Red Velvet"
16. "Wild Hearts"
17. "Smile"
18. "The Chain"
19. "Did You Have Your Fun?"

=== Tour dates ===
Date	City	Country	Venue
North America
April 27, 2017	New York City	United States	Gramercy Theatre
May 11, 2017	Los Angeles	United States	Teragram Ballroom
June 17, 2017	Hot Springs	United States	Timberwood Amphitheater
June 24, 2017	Denver	United States	Elitch Gardens
June 26, 2017	Chicago	United States	Bottom Lounge
June 27, 2017	Detroit	United States	St. Andrew's Hall
June 28, 2017	Toronto	Canada	Phoenix Concert Theatre
June 30, 2017	Boston	United States	Paradise
July 1, 2017	Darien Lake	United States	Darien Performing Arts Center
July 17, 2017	San Francisco	United States	Great American Music Hall
July 19, 2017	Seattle	United States	The Crocodile
July 2, 2017	Philadelphia	United States	Theatre of Living Arts
July 4, 2017	Baltimore	United States	Baltimore Sound Stage
July 5, 2017	Charlotte	United States	The Underground
July 7, 2017	Atlanta	United States	The Loft
July 8, 2017	Orlando	United States	The Plaza Live
July 10, 2017	Houston	United States	White Oak
July 11, 2017	Dallas	United States	Trees
July 12, 2017	Austin	United States	Parish
July 14, 2017	Tucson	United States	Rialto Theatre
July 15, 2017	San Diego	United States	Soma
July 16, 2017	Pomona	United States	The Glasshouse
July 20, 2017	Portland	United States	Wonder Ballroom
August 10, 2017	Monterrey	Mexico	Arena Monterrey
August 12, 2017	Guadalajara	Mexico	Teatro Diana
August 13, 2017	Mexico City	Mexico	Pepsi Center
August 19, 2017	Oklahoma City	United States	Starlight Amphitheater
Europe
September 13, 2017	Dublin	Ireland	Vicar Street
September 14, 2017	Belfast	United Kingdom	Mandela Hall
September 16, 2017	Glasgow	United Kingdom	O2 ABC
September 17, 2017	Nottingham	United Kingdom	Rock City
September 18, 2017	Bristol	United Kingdom	The Fleece
September 20, 2017	Manchester	United Kingdom	O2 Ritz
September 22, 2017	London	United Kingdom	KOKO
September 24, 2017	Paris	France	Le Trianon
September 26, 2017	Amsterdam	Netherlands	Melkweg
September 27, 2017	Copenhagen	Denmark	Amager Bio
September 29, 2017	Oslo	Norway	Vulkan Arena
September 30, 2017	Stockholm	Sweden	Fryshuset
October 1, 2017	Malmö	Sweden	Kulturbolaget
October 3, 2017	Berlin	Germany	Bi Nuu
October 4, 2017	Prague	Czech Republic	Roxy Prague
October 5, 2017	Vienna	Austria	Simm City
October 6, 2017	Munich	Germany	Technikum
October 8, 2017	Antwerp	Belgium	Trix
October 10, 2017	Zürich	Switzerland	Dynamo
October 11, 2017	Rome	Italy	Orion Live Club
October 12, 2017	Milan	Italy	Live Club
October 13, 2017	Lyon	France	Ninkasi Kao
October 15, 2017	Madrid	Spain	Palacio Vistalegre
October 17, 2017	Barcelona	Spain	Razzmatazz
October 18, 2017	Toulouse	France	Connexion Live
October 20, 2017	Cologne	Germany	Jungle Club
October 22, 2017	Warsaw	Poland	Progresja
South America
November 26, 2017	São Paulo	Brazil	Audio Club
November 28, 2017	Buenos Aires	Argentina	Estadio Luna Park
November 30, 2017	Santiago	Chile	Teatro Caupolicán
December 2, 2017	Lima	Peru	Anfiteatro del Parque de la Exposición
Asia
January 23, 2018	Tokyo	Japan	Zepp Tokyo
January 24, 2018	Tokyo	Japan	Zepp Tokyo
January 25, 2018	Osaka	Japan	Zepp Namba

== Promotional tours ==
=== 3M Tour ===
3M Tour
- Tour by R5
- Associated album: Ready Set Rock
- Start date: November 18, 2012
- End date: November 20, 2012
- Legs: 1
- No. of shows: 3 total

R5 concert chronology
- 3M Tour (2012); Dancing Out My Pants Tour (2013)

3M Tour was the first promotional concert tour by band R5. The concert series's name was inspired by the title of the three cities, all beginning with "M". The tour included only three dates: Madison on November 18, 2012, Milwaukee on November 19 and Minneapolis on November 20. The tour included the first time the possibility to buy VIP tickets, including prizes, photographs and meet the band. The setlist consisted in songs of their first extended play Ready Set Rock, released in 2010 and The Ting Tings's cover version of "Shut Up and Let Me Go". After the tour, the band released a mini-documentary about the concert on their official channel on December 20, 2012.

Setlist

1. "Crazy 4 U"
2. Medley: "Heartbeat" / "Not a Love Song"
3. "Heard It on the Radio"
4. "Can You Feel It"
5. "Say You'll Stay
6. "Cali Girls"
7. "Keep Away"
8. "Shut Up and Let Me Go" (The Ting Tings cover)
9. "What Do I Have to Do?"
10. "Love To Love Her"
11. "Wishing I Was 23"
12. "Take U There"
13. "A Billion Hits"

Tour dates

Date	City	Country	Venue
North America
November 18, 2012	Madison	United States	The Loft
November 19, 2012	Milwaukee	United States	Turner Hall
November 20, 2012	Minneapolis	United States	Gabooze

=== Dancing Out My Pants Tour ===
Dancing Out My Pants Tour
- Tour by R5
- Associated album: Louder
- Start date: September 3, 2013
- End date: September 27, 2013
- Legs: 1
- No. of shows: 7 total

R5 concert chronology
- 3M Tour Tour (2012); Dancing Out My Pants Tour (2013); Live and Again (2017)

Dancing Out My Pants Tour was the second promotional concert tour by band R5. The tour served to promote the debut album of the band, Louder, traveling in North America. The also played some previous songs and The Script's cover "Breakeven". The tour started on September 3, 2013, in Orlando, Florida, and ending on September 27, in Mashantucket Pequot Tribe, Connecticut.

Setlist

1. "(I Can't) Forget About You"
2. "Here Comes Forever"
3. "Pass Me By"
4. "Crazy 4 U"
5. "I Want You Bad"
6. "What Do I Have to Do?"
7. "A Billion Hits"
8. "If I Can't Be With You"
9. "Breakeven" (The Script cover)
10. "Love Me Like That"
11. "Wishing I Was 23"
12. "Fallin' for You"
13. "Cali Girls"
14. "Ain't No Way We're Goin' Home"
15. "One Last Dance"
16. "Loud"

Tour dates

Date	City	Country	Venue
North America
September 3, 2013	Orlando	United States	Hard Rock Cafe
September 6, 2013	Atlanta	United States	Cobb Energy Performing Arts Centre
September 13, 2013	Pomona	United States	Child Development Center
September 19, 2013	Rosemont	United States	Rosemont Theatre
September 23, 2013	Toronto	Canada	Sony Centre for the Performing Arts
September 26, 2013	Sayreville	United States	Standard Ballroom
September 27, 2013	Mashantucket Pequot Tribe	United States	Foxwoods Resort Casino
