= Live in London (R5 EP) =

EP by R5
- Released: May 29, 2014
- Recorded: 2013 at The O2 Arena
- Length: 28:02
- Label: Hollywood

R5 chronology
Louder (2013)	Live in London (2014)	Heart Made Up on You (2014)

Live in London is the second EP by American pop rock band R5. The EP was released on May 29, 2014 by Hollywood only for digital download. The album is the recording of the series of videos released on VEVO.

== Track listing ==
No.	Title	Writer(s)	Length
1.	"Counting Stars" (featuring The Vamps)	Ryan Tedder	5:34
2.	"(I Can't) Forget About You"	R5; Emanuel Kiriakou; Andrew Goldstein; Evan "Kidd" Bogart; Lindy Robbins	4:33
3.	"Ain't No Way We're Goin' Home"	Bogart; Goldstein; Kiriakou	3:52
4.	"Loud"	Bogart; Goldstein; Kiriakou; Robbins	6:53
5.	"Pass Me By"	R5; Bogart; Goldstein; Kiriakou; Savan Kotecha	3:43
6.	"One Last Dance"	Bogart; Goldstein; Kiriakou	3:27
Total length:			28:02

== Release history ==
Country	Date	Format	Label
United Kingdom	May 29, 2014	Digital download	Hollywood
