= Love Me Like That (R5 song) =

Promotional single by R5

from the album Louder
- Released: September 16, 2013
- Recorded: 2012–13
- Genre: Pop; hip hop
- Length: 3:21
- Label: Hollywood
- Songwriters: Evan “Kidd” Bogart; R5; Lindy Robbins
- Producers: Andrew Goldstein; Emanuel Kiriakou

"Love Me Like That" is a song by American band R5 from their 2013 debut studio album Louder. It is the first R5 song to feature Rydel Lynch as lead vocalist.

== Background ==
"Love Me Like That" was written by Evan “Kid” Bogart, R5, and Lindy Robbins. It was produced by Andrew Goldstein and Emanuel Kiriakou. There is no music video for the song, but the audio was published to YouTube on September 16, 2013, from the R5 Vevo account. It currently has over 200,000 views.

== Critical reception ==
The song received generally positive reviews, with AllMusic's Tim Sendra referring to the interlude as "sassy" and a "cheerleader hip-hop jammer." Rachel Ho of Musicale called the song, "a funky track which helps showcase the 20 year old's gargantuan vocal range." On the other hand Amanda Joyce of Portrait Magazine stated that it was, "not a bad song, but a song that gets old after you listen to it a few times. It's definitely not something you can have on repeat, unlike the rest of the album."

== Performances ==
The band has performed the song on several occasions including the following:

- 14 September 2013 during their Louder tour.
- 28 October 2013 during their "Dancing Out My Pants" tour at the Paramount Theater in Huntington, New York.
- 16 November 2013 during their Louder tour at Club Nokia in Los Angeles.
- 14 March 2014 live in London.

== Credits and personnel ==
The credits have been adapted from the liner notes of Louder.

Recording

The song was recorded in Burbank, California.

Personnel

- Rydel Lynch – lead vocals and backing vocals, songwriter
- Ross Lynch – instruments, songwriter
- Riker Lynch – instruments, songwriter
- Rocky Lynch – instruments, songwriter
- Ellington Ratliff – instruments, songwriter
- Evan Bogart – songwriter
- Andrew Goldstein – producer, programming
- Emanuel Kiriakou – producer
- Lindy Robbins – songwriter
