= (I Can't) Forget About You =

Single by R5

from the album Louder
- Released: December 25, 2013
- Recorded: 2013
- Genre: Power pop
- Length: 3:31
- Label: Hollywood
- Songwriters: Evan "Kidd" Bogart; Emanuel Kiriakou; Andrew Goldstein; Lindy Robbins; Riker Lynch; Rocky Lynch; Rydel Lynch; Ellington Ratliff; Ross Lynch
- Producers: Kiriakou; Goldstein

R5 singles chronology
"Pass Me By" (2013)	"(I Can't) Forget About You" (2013)	"One Last Dance" (2014)

Music video
- "(I Can't) Forget About You" on YouTube

"(I Can't) Forget About You" (in the album version known simply as "Forget About You") is a song by American pop rock band R5, taken from their debut studio album, Louder. The song was released as the third single on December 25, 2013 (Christmas Day).

== Reception ==
"(I Can't) Forget About You" received positive reviews, especially its music video. When Popstar Online posted the video to their website, they said it was "perfect" and "cool". DisneyDreaming.com commented that "[the video] is super fun, and you're definitely going to want to watch from start to finish."

== Live performances ==
On October 21, 2013, the band performed an acoustic version in web show On The Charts, in ClevverTV. The song was performed on Disney Channel's summer special Disney's Aulani Resort in Hawaii, in November 16. On April 11, 2014, they performed the song in Live! with Kelly and Michael. It was performed also in Radio Disney Music Awards, on April 26. R5 also performed in Wango Tango, on May 10. On June 10, "(I Can't) Forget About You" was performed on Good Morning America with an exclusive interview.

== Music videos ==
The official music video was shot over the Thanksgiving holiday in Tokyo. It was directed by Thom Glunt and released on January 15, 2014. In the video, after a night of drinking, the band members wake up alone in different parts of Tokyo — Rocky in a rolled up carpet on the streets, Riker in a hotel room full of girls, Rydel in a box with vegetables, Ratliff in a car and Ross on a bench next to a guy. They are hungover and don't remember the show that should do that night. They had to use clues given to them by people to reconnect to each other and remember the show. At the end of the video, the members agree again in different places alone after a new night of drinking.

On the same day, a second version of the video was released exclusively on Disney Channel, showing the group only playing in a fictional concert. The second version was released because Ross was in the television series Austin & Ally, focused on teenagers, and Disney Channel thought it would be not good the star of the show on a hungover video, which suggests that they had been drinking.

== Charts ==
Chart (2013)	Peak position
US Pop Digital Songs (Billboard)	47
US Hot 100 Airplay (Billboard)	96

== Release history ==
Country	Date	Format(s)	Label
United States	February 25, 2014	Mainstream radio	Hollywood Records
