= E. Kidd Bogart =

American songwriter and music executive

- Born: Evan Kidd Bogart; January 23, 1978 (age 48)
- Origin: Los Angeles, California, U.S.
- Genres: Pop; R&B; pop rock
- Occupations: Songwriter; record producer; music publisher; record executive
- Years active: 1994–present
- Spouse: ZZ Ward (m. 2017)

Evan Kidd Bogart (born January 23, 1978) is an American songwriter, music publisher, record executive and television producer. He is the son of Casablanca Records founder Neil Bogart and former Kiss manager Joyce Bogart Trabulus. Bogart has won a Grammy Award for his songwriting work on Beyoncé's 2008 single "Halo", from three total nominations. He currently serves as Vice Chair of the Board of Trustees for The Recording Academy and Chair of their Songwriters & Composers Wing.

== Discography (alphabetical) ==
=== Songs written by Evan "Kidd" Bogart ===
- Adam Lambert – For Your Entertainment
  - "Broken Open"
  - "Down The Rabbit Hole" (iTunes bonus track)
- Annabel Jones - Libelle
  - "Magnetic"
- Ashley Tisdale – Headstrong
  - "He Said She Said"
- Augustana – Augustana
  - "On The Other Side"
- Beyoncé – I Am... Sasha Fierce
  - "Halo"
  - "Hello"
- Becky G - No Drama
  - "No Drama" (featuring Ozuna)
- Big Time Rush – Big Time Rush
  - "I Know You Know" (featuring Cymphonique)
- Big Time Rush – Elevate
  - "If I Ruled The World" (featuring Iyaz)
- Blake Lewis – A.D.D. (Audio Day Dream)
  - "Surrender"
- Brandy – Human
  - "Right Here (Departed)"
- Bridgit Mendler – Hello My Name Is...
  - "Ready Or Not"
  - "Forgot To Laugh"
  - "Hurricane"
  - "The Fall Song"
  - "Rocks At My Window"
- Britney Spears – Blackout
  - "Everybody"
- Britney Spears – Glory
  - "Love Me Down"
- Bülow
  - "You & Jennifer"
  - "You & Jennifer (The Other Side)" featuring Rich the Kid
- Carly Rae Jepsen - E*MO*TION
  - "Black Heart"
- Class Actress - Movies
  - "More Than You"
  - "The Limit"
  - "High on Love"
  - "GFE"
  - "Love My Darkness"
  - "Movies"
- The Cheetah Girls – TCG
  - "Fuego"
  - "Do No Wrong"
- The D.E.Y. – The DEY Has Come
  - "Give You the World"
  - "Dame Un Memento"
- Demi Lovato – Here We Go Again
  - "Got Dynamite"
- Demi Lovato – Demi
  - "I Hate You, Don't Leave Me"
- DJ Vice – Piñata
  - "Piñata" feat. BIA, Kap G and Justin Quiles
- Donna Summer – Crayons
  - "Mr. Music"
  - "The Queen Is Back"
- Emblem3 – "Nothing To Lose
  - "Girl Next Door"
  - "Teenage Kings"
- Enrique Iglesias – Euphoria
  - "Dirty Dancer" feat. Usher
  - "Why Not Me?"
  - "Dirty Dancer remix" feat. Usher and Lil Wayne
- Fantasia – Side Effects of You
  - "Lighthouse"
- Fleur East - Love, Sax & Flashbacks
  - "Love Me or Leave Me Alone"
- Girls' Generation - Girls' Generation
  - "You-aholic"
- Heidi Montag – Body Language
  - "Body Language"
- Hey Violet – Brand New Moves
  - "Pure"
- Hilary Duff – Best of Hilary Duff
  - "Reach Out"
- Hot Chelle Rae – Whatever
  - "Tonight Tonight"
  - "I Like It Like That" feat. New Boyz
  - "Radio"
  - "Beautiful Freaks"
- Jada – Bring It On: In It to Win It
  - "I'm That Chick"
- Jason Derülo – Jason Derülo
  - "The Sky's The Limit"
  - "Fallen"
  - "Encore"
- Jason Derülo – Future History
  - "It Girl"
- Jennifer Lopez – Brave
  - "Stay Together"
- Jennifer Lopez – Love?
  - "Until It Beats No More"
- Jesse McCartney – Departure
  - "My Baby"
- Jessi Malay – Jessi Malay
  - "Gimme" (featuring Lil Scrappy)
  - "Draw The Line"
- Jessica Mauboy – Get 'Em Girls
  - "Scariest Part"
- Jessica Simpson – VH1's Price of Beauty
  - "Who We Are"
- K'naan – Country, God or the Girl
  - "Hurt Me Tomorrow"
- Keke Palmer – So Uncool
  - "Footwurkin'"
- Keyshia Cole – A Different Me
  - "This Is Us"
- Kristinia DeBarge – Exposed
  - "Future Love"
  - "Speak Up"
  - "Sabotage"
- Lemaitre – Afterglow
  - "Playing To Lose" feat. Stanaj
- Leona Lewis – Echo
  - "Happy"
  - "Stone Hearts & Hand Grenades" (Hidden Track; Amazon Exclusive bonus track)
- Liam Payne - LP1
  - "Live Forever" feat. Cheat Codes
- Lindsey Stirling – Warmer In The Winter
  - "Warmer In The Winter" feat. Trombone Shorty
- Livvi Franc – Livvi Franc
  - "Automatik"
- Lizzo – Coconut Oil
  - "Phone"
- Lizzo – Cuz I Love You
  - "Water Me"
- Louis The Child – Last To Leave
  - "Last To Leave" featuring Caroline Ailin
- Louis The Child – Here For Now
  - "Big Love" featuring EarthGang and MNDR
- Lucy Walsh – Lost in the Lights
  - "Crash"
  - "Tell Her"
  - "Guilty"
- M. Pokora – MP3
  - "Treason"
- Madison Beer - Unbreakable
  - "Unbreakable"
- Madison Beer - Life Support
  - "Emotional Bruises"
- Madonna – Rebel Heart
  - "Ghosttown"
  - "Inside Out"
- Marco Mengoni – #prontoacorrere
  - "Non passerai"
- Maya B – Real Life
  - "Real Life"
- Methal – Cycles
  - "Cycles" feat. X Ambassadors
- MKTO – Bad Girls
  - "Bad Girls"
  - "Afraid of the Dark"
  - "Monaco"
  - "Just Imagine It"
- MKTO - MKTO
  - "Classic"
  - "Thank You"
  - "God Only Knows"
  - "American Dream"
  - "Forever Until Tomorrow"
  - "Could Be Me" feat. Ne-Yo
  - "Wasted"
  - "Heartbreak Holiday"
  - "Nowhere"
  - "No More Second Chances"
  - "Goodbye Song"
- The Mowgli's – Waiting For The Dawn
  - "Say It, Just Say It"
- The Mowgli's - Summertime
  - "Summertime"
- Nick Lachey – Someone To Dance With
  - "Someone To Dance With"
- NLT – Not Like Them
  - "Karma"
- No Angels – Welcome to the Dance
  - "Shut Your Mouth"
  - "Up Against The Wall"
- Oh Land – Oh Land
  - "Human"
- Oh Land - Wish Bones
  - "Cherry on Top"
- Olivia Holt – Olivia
  - "History"
- Paris Hilton – Paris
  - "I Want You"
- The Pussycat Dolls & A.R Rahman- Doll Domination
  - "Jai Ho! (You Are My Destiny)" ft. Nicole Scherzinger
- The Pussycat Dolls - Doll Domination 2.0
  - "Top Of The World"
- R5 – Sometime Last Night
  - "Lightning Strikes"
- R5 – "Louder"
  - "Loud"
  - "Pass Me By"
  - "Forget About You"
  - "One Last Dance"
  - "Ain't No Way Were Goin Home"
  - "I Want U Bad"
  - "If I Can't Be With You"
  - "Love Me Like That"
  - "Falling For You"
  - "Here Comes Forever"
- Rachel Platten - Wildfire
  - "Hey, Hey Hallelujah"
- Relient K – Collapsible Lung
  - "Boomerang"
- Rich Gains – 7 Digits
  - "7 Digits" (Feat. Freddie Gibbs, Nico Segal, ZZ Ward)
- Rihanna – A Girl Like Me
  - "SOS"
- Robert Delong – In The Cards
  - "Long Way Down"
  - Futures Right Here"
  - "Possessed"
  - "Guillotine"
- Robert Delong - Long Way Down
  - "Feels Like"
  - "Long Way Down"
- Ross Lynch – Teen Beach 2 (Original Motion Picture Soundtrack)
  - "On My Own"
- Rozzi Crane – Never Over You
  - "Never Over You"
- Sarah Connor – Sexy as Hell
  - "Fall Apart"
- Sean Kingston – Sean Kingston
  - "Take You There"
  - "Dry Your Eyes"
  - "There's Nothin" (featuring Paula DeAnda)
  - "Your Sister"
  - "There's Nothin'" (remix); featuring Elan from The D.E.Y. and Juelz Santana
- Selah Sue - Reason
  - Together feat. Childish Gambino
- Simple Plan - Video Version
  - "Summer Paradise" ft. MKTO
- Steve James – Warrior
  - "Warrior" (Feat. LIGHTS)
- TOKIMONSTA – We Love
  - "We Love" (Feat. MNDR)
- Travie McCoy – Lazarus
  - "After Midnight"
- Varsity Fanclub – Varsity Fanclub
  - "Future Love"
  - "Lost Then Found"
- The Veronicas - Godzilla
  - "High Score"
- Victoria Justice – Victorious 3.0: Even More Music from the Hit TV Show
  - "Here's 2 Us"
- VV Brown – Lollipops & Politics
  - "Children" feat. Chiddy Bang
- Wallpaper. – STUPiDFACEDD
  - "Shotgun"
  - "Butt2Butt" feat. Too Short
  - "OKAY"
  - "Fucking Best Song Everrr"
- Wallpaper. – Ricky Reed is Real
  - "WHO RLY CRS"
- WayV – Awaken the World
  - "Domino 多米诺"
- ZZ Ward – "Eleven Roses"
  - "Overdue"
  - "Got It Bad"
  - "Criminal"
  - "Cinnamon Stix"
- ZZ Ward – Til The Casket Drops
  - "Criminal" ft. Freddie Gibbs
- ZZ Ward – Love and War
  - "Lonely"
- ZZ Ward – The Deep
  - "The Deep"
  - "The Deep" feat. Joey Purp
- ZZ Ward – The Storm
  - "Ghost"
  - "Let It Burn"
  - "Help Me Mama"
  - "Hold On"
  - "Ride" feat. Gary Clark Jr.

== Published by Evan "Kidd" Bogart ==
=== Seeker Music ===
- Kito
- Christopher Cross
- Sofia Valdes
- Katie Pearlman
- Sweetsound
- Charlie Brand
- fanclubwallet
- Kendall Brower
- Bones Owens

=== The Boardwalk Music Group ===
- Ricky Reed
- ZZ Ward
- Blended Babies
- Tom Peyton
- Nova Rockafeller

=== Camelot Music Group ===
- Kat Dahlia
- Christian Leave
- Mads Langer
- Gina Kushka
- Cleo Tighe

=== Crooked Paintings ===
- MKTO
- Jessica "Harlœ" Karpov
- Andrew "FRND" Goldstein
- Alex Chapman
- Dag Lundberg

== Television by Evan "Kidd" Bogart ==
=== Boardwalk Entertainment Group ===
- Platinum Hit – Bravo
  - Executive Producer, Producer, Creator
- Majors & Minors – The Hub
  - Executive Producer, Producer, Creator

== Filmography ==
- Spinning Gold (2023) – in production
  - Executive Producer, Executive Music Producer
- Juliet & Romeo (2025)
  - Executive Producer, Executive Music Producer

== Awards and nominations ==
=== BMI Awards ===
==== Songwriter ====
Year	Nominee / work	Award	Result	Ref
2006	"SOS" performed by Rihanna	Pop Award Top Songs of 2006	Won	
2007	"SOS" performed by Rihanna	#1's Award	Won	
2008	"Take You There" performed by Sean Kingston	Pop Award Top Songs of 2008	Won	
2009	"Halo" performed by Beyoncé Knowles	Pop Award Top Songs of 2009	Won	
2011	"Tonight Tonight" performed by Hot Chelle Rae	Pop Award Top Songs of 2011	Won	
2012	"It Girl" performed by Jason Derulo	Pop Award Top Songs of 2012	Won	
2012	"I Like It Like That" performed by Hot Chelle Rae	Pop Award Top Songs of 2012	Won	
2014	"Classic" performed by MKTO	Pop Award Top Songs of 2014	Won	

==== Publisher ====
Year	Nominee / work	Award	Result	Ref
2014	"Talk Dirty" written by Ricky Reed, performed by Jason Derulo	Pop Award Top Songs of 2014	Won	
2015	"Wiggle" written by Ricky Reed, performed by Jason Derulo feat. Snoop Dogg	R&B/Hip-Hop Top Songs of 2015	Won	
2016	"No" written by Ricky Reed, performed by Meghan Trainor	Pop Award Top Songs of 2016	Won	
2016	"Me Too" written by Ricky Reed, performed by Meghan Trainor	Pop Award Top Songs of 2016	Won	
2017	"Handclap" written by Ricky Reed, performed by Fitz and the Tantrums	Pop Award Top Songs of 2017	Won	
2018	"Bad At Love" written by Ricky Reed, performed by Halsey	Pop Award Top Songs of 2018	Won	
2019	"Truth Hurts" written by Ricky Reed, performed by Lizzo	Pop Award Top Songs of 2019	Won	

=== Grammy Awards ===
==== Songwriter ====
Year	Nominee / work	Award	Result	Ref
2010	"Halo" performed by Beyoncé	Best Female Pop Vocal Performance	Won	
2010	"Halo" performed by Beyoncé	Record of the Year	Nominated	
2011	"Halo (Live)" performed by Beyoncé	Best Female Pop Vocal Performance	Nominated	

=== Miscellaneous ===
Year	Nominee / work	Award	Result	Ref
2009	"Halo" performed by Beyoncé	MTV Europe Music Awards – Best Song	Won	
2012	Evan Bogart	Billboard – 40 Under 40	Won	
2013	"Hurt Me Tomorrow" performed by K'naan	Socan Urban Music Awards – Top Songs of 2013	Won	
2013	Evan Bogart	Billboard – 40 Under 40	Won	
