= Dancing with the Stars (American TV series) season 20 =

Dancing with the Stars
- Season 20
- Promotional poster, featuring pro dancers Peta Murgatroyd and Valentin Chmerkovskiy
- Hosted by: Tom Bergeron; Erin Andrews
- Judges: Carrie Ann Inaba; Len Goodman; Bruno Tonioli; Julianne Hough
- Celebrity winner: Rumer Willis
- Professional winner: Valentin Chmerkovskiy
- No. of episodes: 14

Release
- Original network: ABC
- Original release: March 16 – May 19, 2015

Season chronology
- ← Previous; Season 19 Next → Season 21

Season twenty of Dancing with the Stars premiered on March 16, 2015, and concluded on May 19, 2015.

This season marked the tenth anniversary of the show. In honor of this anniversary, winners Rumer Willis and Valentin Chmerkovskiy received a special 10th Anniversary golden Mirrorball Trophy. R5 singer Riker Lynch and Allison Holker finished in second place, while former soldier Noah Galloway and Sharna Burgess finished in third.

== Cast ==
=== Couples ===
This season featured twelve celebrity contestants. Ten of the professional partners were revealed on February 11, 2015, on Good Morning America. Joining Lindsay Arnold, Sasha Farber, Henry Byalikov, and Jenna Johnson in the troupe this season were Alan Bersten, from the tenth season of So You Think You Can Dance, and Brittany Cherry. Eleven of the celebrity competitors and their professional partners were revealed on Good Morning America on February 24, 2015. Witney Carson's celebrity partner was reported to be Chris Soules from The Bachelor on March 4, 2015; Soules was later confirmed on March 10, nearly 12 hours after that show's finale.

Celebrity	Notability	Professional partner	Status	Ref.
Redfoo	LMFAO singer, producer & rapper	Emma Slater	Eliminated 1st on March 23, 2015	
Charlotte McKinney	Model & actress	Keo Motsepe	Eliminated 2nd on March 30, 2015	
Michael Sam	NFL defensive end	Peta Murgatroyd	Eliminated 3rd on April 6, 2015	
Suzanne Somers	Television actress & author	Tony Dovolani	Eliminated 4th on April 13, 2015	
Patti LaBelle	Soul singer	Artem Chigvintsev	Eliminated 5th on April 20, 2015	
Willow Shields	The Hunger Games actress	Mark Ballas	Eliminated 6th on April 27, 2015	
Robert Herjavec	Shark Tank panelist & businessman	Kym Johnson	Eliminated 7th on May 5, 2015	
Chris Soules	The Bachelor star	Witney Carson	Eliminated 8th on May 5, 2015	
Nastia Liukin	Olympic artistic gymnast	Derek Hough; Sasha Farber (Weeks 7–9)	Eliminated 9th on May 12, 2015	
Noah Galloway	Soldier & personal trainer	Sharna Burgess	Third place on May 19, 2015	
Riker Lynch	R5 singer & actor	Allison Holker	Runners-up on May 19, 2015	
Rumer Willis	Film & television actress	Valentin Chmerkovskiy	Winners on May 19, 2015	

=== Host and judges ===
Tom Bergeron returned as host alongside Erin Andrews. Len Goodman, Carrie Ann Inaba, Julianne Hough, and Bruno Tonioli returned as judges.

== Episodes ==
No. overall	No. in season	Title	Rating (18–49)	Original release date	U.S. viewers (millions)
346	1	"Season Premiere"	2.07	March 16, 2015	14.16
347	2	"My Jam Monday"	2.04	March 23, 2015	13.85
348	3	"Latin Night"	2.07	March 30, 2015	13.76
349	4	"Most Memorable Year"	2.03	April 6, 2015	13.75
350	5	"Disney Night"	2.17	April 13, 2015	13.89
351	6	"Spring Break Special"	2.07	April 30, 2015	13.41
352	7	"Eras Night"	2.00	April 27, 2015	13.22
353	8	"10th Anniversary Special"	1.70	April 28, 2015	10.07
354	9	"America's Choice"	1.90	May 4, 2015	12.43
355	10	"America's Choice: Results"	1.40	May 5, 2015	10.29
356	11	"Semifinals"	2.20	May 11, 2015	13.48
357	12	"Semifinals: Results"	1.50	May 12, 2015	10.16
358	13	"Finals: Night 1"	2.30	May 18, 2015	14.35
359	14	"Finals: Night 2"	2.30	May 19, 2015	13.49

== Scoring chart ==
The highest score each week is indicated in bold green with a dagger (†), while the lowest score each week is indicated in italicized red with a double-dagger (‡).

Color key:

Winners
Runners-up
Third place
Eliminated

Dancing with the Stars (season 20) - Weekly scores
Couple	Pl.	Week											
Couple	Pl.	1	2	1+2	3	4	5	6	7	8	9	10	
Couple	Pl.	1	2	1+2	3	4	5	6	7	8	9	Night 1	Night 2
Rumer & Val	1st	**32**†	32	**64**†	33	35	**39**†	32+39=71	35+2=37	40+40=**80**†	38+30=68	40+40=**80**†	+40=**120**† (Note: This couple finished in first place.)
Riker & Allison	2nd	31	32	63	**34**†	34	38	37+39=**76**†	37	39+39=78	40+30=**70**†	40+40=**80**†	+40=**120**† (Note: This couple finished in second place.)
Noah & Sharna	3rd	26	27	53	30	32	28	29+39=68	36+2=38	31+32=63	36+30=66‡	32+40=72‡	+36=108‡ (Note: This couple finished in third place.)
Nastia & Derek	4th	30	**34**†	**64**†	**34**†	36	38	34+39=73	38+3=**41**†	36+40=76	40+30=**70**† (Note: This couple was eliminated.)		
Chris & Witney	5th	26	21‡	47‡	28	27‡	27	31+39=70	31‡	34+30=64			
Robert & Kym	6th	28	28	56	29	34	24‡	28+39=67‡	31‡	33+29=62‡			
Willow & Mark	7th	25	32	57	32	**39**†	34	34+39=73	37+2=39				
Patti & Artem	8th	25	28	53	22‡	30	27	29+39=68					
Suzanne & Tony	9th	25	28	53	25	28	28						
Michael & Peta	10th	26	28	54	24	30							
Charlotte & Keo	11th	22‡	26	48	22‡								
Redfoo & Emma	12th	22‡	31	53									

== Weekly scores ==
Individual judges' scores in the charts below (given in parentheses) are listed in this order from left to right: Carrie Ann Inaba, Len Goodman, Julianne Hough, Bruno Tonioli.

=== Week 1: Premiere Night ===
Couples performed the cha-cha-cha, foxtrot, or jive. Couples are listed in the order they performed.

Couple	Scores	Dance	Music
Willow & Mark	25 (6, 6, 6, 7)	Cha-cha-cha	"Lips Are Movin" — Meghan Trainor
Robert & Kym	28 (7, 7, 7, 7)	Cha-cha-cha	"Bills" — LunchMoney Lewis
Riker & Allison	31 (8, 7, 8, 8)	Jive	"What I Like About You" — The Romantics
Charlotte & Keo	22 (6, 5, 5, 6)	Jive	"Shake a Tail Feather" — The Blues Brothers
Patti & Artem	25 (7, 6, 6, 6)	Foxtrot	"Lady Marmalade" — Labelle
Chris & Witney	26 (7, 6, 6, 7)	Jive	"Footloose" — Kenny Loggins
Michael & Peta	26 (6, 6, 7, 7)	Cha-cha-cha	"Uptown Funk" — Mark Ronson, feat. Bruno Mars
Nastia & Derek	30 (7, 7, 8, 8)	Foxtrot	"New York, New York (FWB Remix)" — Ray Quinn, feat. Ultra Love
Redfoo & Emma	22 (6, 5, 5, 6)	Cha-cha-cha	"Juicy Wiggle" — Redfoo
Noah & Sharna	26 (7, 6, 6, 7)	Cha-cha-cha	"I Lived" — OneRepublic
Suzanne & Tony	25 (6, 6, 6, 7)	Cha-cha-cha	"Physical" — Olivia Newton-John
Rumer & Val	32 (8, 8, 8, 8)	Foxtrot	"Take Me to Church" — Hozier

=== Week 2: My Jam Monday ===
Couples performed one unlearned dance to one of their favorite songs, and are listed in the order they performed.

Couple	Scores	Dance	Music	Result
Chris & Witney	21 (5, 6, 5, 5)	Cha-cha-cha	"Time of Our Lives" ― Pitbull & Ne-Yo	Safe
Suzanne & Tony	28 (7, 7, 7, 7)	Jive	"Whole Lotta Shakin' Goin' On" ― Jerry Lee Lewis	Safe
Robert & Kym	28 (7, 7, 7, 7)	Foxtrot	"You Make Me Feel So Young" — Michael Bublé	Safe
Charlotte & Keo	26 (7, 6, 7, 6)	Cha-cha-cha	"California Gurls" — Katy Perry, feat. Snoop Dogg	Safe
Michael & Peta	28 (7, 7, 7, 7)	Foxtrot	"Working My Way Back to You" — The Spinners	Safe
Rumer & Val	32 (8, 8, 8, 8)	Cha-cha-cha	"Rumour Has It" — Adele	Safe
Redfoo & Emma	31 (8, 7, 8, 8)	Jive	"My Sharona" — The Knack	Eliminated
Willow & Mark	32 (8, 8, 8, 8)	Argentine tango	"Somebody That I Used to Know" — Gotye, feat. Kimbra	Safe
Noah & Sharna	27 (7, 6, 7, 7)	Samba	"Homegrown Honey" — Darius Rucker	Safe
Nastia & Derek	34 (9, 8, 8, 9)	Rumba	"Thinking Out Loud" — Ed Sheeran	Safe
Riker & Allison	32 (8, 8, 8, 8)	Foxtrot	"Sugar" — Maroon 5	Safe
Patti & Artem	28 (7, 7, 7, 7)	Salsa	"In da Club" — 50 Cent	Safe

=== Week 3: Latin Night ===
Couples performed one unlearned Latin-themed dance, and are listed in the order they performed.

Couple	Scores	Dance	Music	Result
Rumer & Val	33 (8, 9, 8, 8)	Salsa	"Turn the Beat Around" — Gloria Estefan	Safe
Charlotte & Keo	22 (6, 5, 5, 6)	Rumba	"Empire" — Shakira	Eliminated
Michael & Peta	24 (6, 6, 6, 6)	Salsa	"Celebrate" — Pitbull	Safe
Riker & Allison	34 (9, 7, 9, 9)	Salsa	"Limbo" — Daddy Yankee	Safe
Suzanne & Tony	25 (6, 6, 6, 7)	Samba	"Copacabana" — Barry Manilow	Safe
Chris & Witney	28 (7, 7, 7, 7)	Argentine tango	"Dangerous" — David Guetta, feat. Sam Martin	Safe
Robert & Kym	29 (7, 7, 8, 7)	Rumba	"How Long Will I Love You?" — Ellie Goulding	Safe
Patti & Artem	22 (6, 5, 5, 6)	Cha-cha-cha	"Oye 2014" — Santana, feat. Pitbull	Safe
Willow & Mark	32 (8, 8, 8, 8)	Paso doble	"Hanuman" — Rodrigo y Gabriela, feat. John Tempesta	Safe
Noah & Sharna	30 (7, 7, 8, 8)	Argentine tango	"Rather Be" — Clean Bandit, feat. Jess Glynne	Safe
Nastia & Derek	34 (9, 8, 9, 8)	Samba	"Chillando Goma" — Fulanito	Safe

=== Week 4: Most Memorable Year Night ===
Couples performed one unlearned dance to celebrate the most memorable years of their lives. Couples are listed in the order they performed.

Couple	Scores	Dance	Music	Result
Nastia & Derek	36 (9, 8, 9, 10)	Argentine tango	"Variations on Dark Eyes" — Lara St. John	Safe
Michael & Peta	30 (7, 7, 8, 8)	Rumba	"Not My Father's Son" — from Kinky Boots	Eliminated
Riker & Allison	34 (8, 8, 9, 9)	Tango	"Shut Up and Dance" — Walk the Moon	Safe
Robert & Kym	34 (8, 9, 8, 9)	Waltz	"The Last Waltz" — Engelbert Humperdinck	Safe
Chris & Witney	27 (7, 6, 7, 7)	Rumba	"The Book of Love" — Gavin James	Safe
Patti & Artem	30 (8, 7, 7, 8)	Jazz	"Dan Swit Me" — Patti LaBelle	Safe
Rumer & Val	35 (9, 8, 9, 9)	Waltz	"Turning Tables" — Adele	Safe
Suzanne & Tony	28 (7, 7, 7, 7)	Foxtrot	"Come and Knock on Our Door" — Ray Charles & Julia Rinker	Safe
Willow & Mark	39 (10, 9, 10, 10)	Contemporary	"Atlas" — Coldplay	Safe
Noah & Sharna	32 (8, 8, 8, 8)	Contemporary	"American Soldier" — Toby Keith	Safe

=== Week 5: Disney Night ===
Couples performed one unlearned dance to a song from a Disney film, and are listed in the order they performed.

Couple	Scores	Dance	Music	Disney film	Result
Suzanne & Tony	28 (7, 7, 7, 7)	Jazz	"He's a Tramp" — Peggy Lee	Lady and the Tramp	Eliminated
Robert & Kym	24 (6, 6, 6, 6)	Quickstep	"Step in Time" — Dick Van Dyke	Mary Poppins	Safe
Patti & Artem	27 (7, 6, 7, 7)	Waltz	"When You Wish upon a Star" — Cliff Edwards	Pinocchio	Safe
Willow & Mark	34 (8, 8, 9, 9)	Foxtrot	"Alice's Theme" — Danny Elfman	Alice in Wonderland	Safe
Chris & Witney	27 (7, 6, 7, 7)	Quickstep	"Zero to Hero" — Ariana Grande	Hercules	Safe
Noah & Sharna	28 (7, 7, 7, 7)	Foxtrot	"A Whole New World" — Brad Kane & Lea Salonga	Aladdin	Safe
Riker & Allison	38 (10, 9, 9, 10)	Paso doble	"He's a Pirate" — Klaus Badelt	Pirates of the Caribbean: The Curse of the Black Pearl	Safe
Rumer & Val	39 (10, 9, 10, 10)	Samba	"Poor Unfortunate Souls" — Pat Carroll	The Little Mermaid	Safe
Nastia & Derek	38 (9, 9, 10, 10)	Jazz	"Love Is an Open Door" — Kristen Bell & Santino Fontana	Frozen	Safe

=== Week 6: Spring Break Night ===
Couples performed one unlearned dance and a team dance. Couples are listed in the order they performed.

Couple	Scores	Dance	Music	Result
Patti & Artem	29 (8, 7, 7, 7)	Quickstep	"Heat Wave" — Martha and the Vandellas	Eliminated
Nastia & Derek	34 (9, 8, 8, 9)	Tango	"Summer" — Calvin Harris	Safe
Willow & Mark	34 (9, 8, 8, 9)	Salsa	"Tequila" — Xavier Cugat	Safe
Robert & Kym	28 (7, 7, 7, 7)	Jive	"Surfin' Safari" — The Beach Boys	Safe
Noah & Sharna	29 (7, 7, 7, 8)	Rumba	"Waves" — Mr Probz	Safe
Rumer & Val	32 (8, 8, 7, 9)	Jazz	"Bootylicious" — Destiny's Child	Safe
Chris & Witney	31 (8, 7, 8, 8)	Viennese waltz	"Hopelessly Devoted to You" — Olivia Newton-John	Safe
Riker & Allison	37 (10, 8, 9, 10)	Samba	"Want to Want Me" — Jason Derulo	Safe
Nastia & Derek Noah & Sharna Robert & Kym Willow & Mark	39 (10, 9, 10, 10)	Freestyle (Team YOLO)	"Wipe Out" — The Surfaris	
Chris & Witney Patti & Artem Riker & Allison Rumer & Val	39 (10, 9, 10, 10)	Freestyle (Team Trouble)	"Trouble" — Iggy Azalea, feat. Jennifer Hudson	

=== Week 7: Eras Night ===
Couples performed one unlearned dance representing a different historical era. The couple with the highest score earned immunity from elimination, while the rest of the couples participated in dance-offs for extra points. For each dance-off, the couple with the highest score picked the opponent against whom they wanted to dance; the chosen opponent was allowed to pick the dance style (from cha-cha-cha, foxtrot, or salsa). The winner of each dance-off earned two points. For winning immunity, Nastia & Sasha received a three-point bonus. Couples are listed in the order they performed.

Couple	Scores	Dance	Era	Music	Result
Riker & Allison	37 (9, 10, 9, 9)	Quickstep	1920s	"Wiggle" — Scott Bradlee & Postmodern Jukebox	Safe
Chris & Witney	31 (8, 7, 8, 8)	Foxtrot	1940s	"Five Minutes More" — Frank Sinatra	Safe
Rumer & Val	35 (8, 9, 9, 9)	Jive	1960s	"Dear Future Husband" — Meghan Trainor	Safe
Noah & Sharna	36 (10, 8, 9, 9)	Jazz	1970s	"Super Bad" — James Brown	Safe
Robert & Kym	31 (7, 8, 8, 8)	Argentine tango	1980s	"Word Up!" — Cameo	Safe
Nastia & Sasha	38 (10, 9, 9, 10)	Charleston	Modern	"Honey, I'm Good." — Andy Grammer	Immunity
Willow & Mark	37 (9, 9, 9, 10)	Jazz	Futuristic	"Electric Feel" — MGMT	Eliminated

Dance-offs
Couple	Dance	Music	Result
Willow & Mark	Salsa	"Temperature" — Sean Paul	Winners
Riker & Allison	Salsa	"Temperature" — Sean Paul	Losers
Noah & Sharna	Cha-cha-cha	"Dance with Me" — Kelly Clarkson	Winners
Robert & Kym	Cha-cha-cha	"Dance with Me" — Kelly Clarkson	Losers
Rumer & Val	Foxtrot	"Orange Colored Sky" — Nat King Cole	Winners
Chris & Witney	Foxtrot	"Orange Colored Sky" — Nat King Cole	Losers

=== Week 8: America's Choice Night ===
Couples performed a routine featuring an unlearned dance and song that was chosen by the public, as well as a trio dance involving an eliminated pro or a member of the dance troupe. Couples are listed in the order they performed. Two couples were eliminated at the end of the night.

Couple	Trio partner	Scores	Dance	Music	Result
Noah & Sharna	Emma Slater	31 (8, 7, 8, 8)	Tango	"Geronimo" — Sheppard	Safe
Noah & Sharna	Emma Slater	32 (8, 8, 8, 8)	Salsa	"Mr. Put It Down" — Ricky Martin, feat. Pitbull	Safe
Chris & Witney	Lindsay Arnold	34 (9, 8, 9, 8)	Contemporary	"Lay Me Down" — Sam Smith	Eliminated
Chris & Witney	Lindsay Arnold	30 (7, 7, 8, 8)	Paso doble	"Outside" — Calvin Harris, feat. Ellie Goulding	Eliminated
Riker & Allison	Brittany Cherry	39 (10, 9, 10, 10)	Viennese waltz	"What Now" — Rihanna	Safe
Riker & Allison	Brittany Cherry	39 (10, 9, 10, 10)	Jazz	"A Little Party Never Killed Nobody (All We Got)" — Fergie, Q-Tip & GoonRock	Safe
Robert & Kym	Jenna Johnson	33 (8, 8, 9, 8)	Contemporary	"Champagne Kisses" — Jessie Ware	Eliminated
Robert & Kym	Jenna Johnson	29 (7, 7, 8, 7)	Samba	"Cinema Italiano" — Kate Hudson	Eliminated
Nastia & Sasha	Derek Hough	36 (9, 9, 9, 9)	Paso doble	"Centuries" — Fall Out Boy	Safe
Nastia & Sasha	Derek Hough	40 (10, 10, 10, 10)	Jive	"Diane Young" — Vampire Weekend	Safe
Rumer & Val	Artem Chigvintsev	40 (10, 10, 10, 10)	Rumba	"Perhaps, Perhaps, Perhaps" — Doris Day	Safe
Rumer & Val	Artem Chigvintsev	40 (10, 10, 10, 10)	Paso doble	"Scott & Fran's Paso Doble" — David Hirschfelder & The Bogo Pogo Orchestra	Safe

=== Week 9: Semifinals ===
Couples performed one unlearned dance, and a routine coached and styled by one of the four judges. To avoid favoritism, the judges did not score the couple they coached (their absent score is marked by an X below), so the second-round dances received a total score out of 30 instead of 40. Couples are listed in the order they performed.

Couple	Judge	Scores	Dance	Music	Result
Rumer & Val	Bruno Tonioli	38 (10, 9, 9, 10)	Viennese waltz	"Earned It" — The Weeknd	Safe
Rumer & Val	Bruno Tonioli	30 (10, 10, 10, X)	Contemporary	"Theme from Swan Lake, Op. 20" — Pyotr Ilyich Tchaikovsky	Safe
Noah & Sharna	Carrie Ann Inaba	36 (9, 9, 9, 9)	Viennese waltz	"The Time of My Life" — David Cook	Safe
Noah & Sharna	Carrie Ann Inaba	30 (X, 10, 10, 10)	Paso doble	"Unstoppable" — E.S. Posthumus	Safe
Riker & Allison	Julianne Hough	40 (10, 10, 10, 10)	Contemporary	"Work Song" — Hozier	Safe
Riker & Allison	Julianne Hough	30 (10, 10, X, 10)	Argentine tango	"Für Elise" — District 78	Safe
Nastia & Sasha	Len Goodman	40 (10, 10, 10, 10)	Quickstep	"Feelin' Good" — Christina Grimmie	Eliminated
Nastia & Derek	Len Goodman	30 (10, X, 10, 10)	Viennese waltz	"Fall for You" — Leela James	Eliminated

=== Week 10: Finals ===
On the first night, couples performed a dance that they had previously done, as well as their freestyle routine. On the second night, the couples performed a fusion dance of two previously learned dance styles. Couples are listed in the order they performed.

Night 1

Couple	Scores	Dance	Music
Noah & Sharna	32 (8, 8, 8, 8)	Argentine tango	"Rather Be" — Clean Bandit, feat. Jess Glynne
Noah & Sharna	40 (10, 10, 10, 10)	Freestyle	"Titanium" — David Guetta, feat. Sia "Fix You" — Coldplay
Riker & Allison	40 (10, 10, 10, 10)	Paso doble	"He's a Pirate" — Klaus Badelt
Riker & Allison	40 (10, 10, 10, 10)	Freestyle	"I Won't Dance (Step Up 3D Remix)" — Fred Astaire
Rumer & Val	40 (10, 10, 10, 10)	Foxtrot	"Take Me to Church" — Hozier
Rumer & Val	40 (10, 10, 10, 10)	Freestyle	"Toxic" — Rumer Willis

Night 2

Couple	Scores	Dance	Music	Result
Noah & Sharna	36 (9, 9, 9, 9)	Argentine tango & Cha-cha-cha	"Surrender" — Cash Cash, feat. Julia Michaels	Third place
Riker & Allison	40 (10, 10, 10, 10)	Quickstep & Salsa	"Classic" — MKTO	Runners-up
Rumer & Val	40 (10, 10, 10, 10)	Foxtrot & Paso doble	"Big Jet Plane" - Angus & Julia Stone"	Winners

== Dance chart ==
The couples performed the following each week:

- Week 1: One unlearned dance (cha-cha-cha, foxtrot, or jive)
- Week 2: One unlearned dance
- Week 3: One unlearned dance
- Week 4: One unlearned dance
- Week 5: One unlearned dance
- Week 6: One unlearned dance & team dance
- Week 7: One unlearned dance & dance-offs
- Week 8: One unlearned dance & trio dance
- Week 9 (Semifinals): One unlearned dance & judge's choice
- Week 10 (Finals, Night 1): Repeated dance & freestyle
- Week 10 (Finals, Night 2): Fusion dance

Color key:

No scores received

Dancing with the Stars (season 20) - Dance chart
Couple	Week															
Couple	1	2	3	4	5	6		7		8		9		10		
Couple	1	2	3	4	5	6		7		8		9		Night 1		Night 2
Rumer & Val	Foxtrot	Cha-cha-cha	Salsa	Waltz	Samba	Jazz	Team Freestyle	Jive	Foxtrot	Rumba	Paso doble	Viennese waltz	Contemp.	Foxtrot	Freestyle	Foxtrot & Paso doble
Riker & Allison	Jive	Foxtrot	Salsa	Tango	Paso doble	Samba	Team Freestyle	Quickstep	Salsa	Viennese waltz	Jazz	Contemp.	Argentine tango	Paso doble	Freestyle	Quickstep & Salsa
Noah & Sharna	Cha-cha-cha	Samba	Argentine tango	Contemp.	Foxtrot	Rumba	Team Freestyle	Jazz	Cha-cha-cha	Tango	Salsa	Viennese waltz	Paso doble	Argentine tango	Freestyle	Argentine tango & Cha-cha-cha
Nastia & Derek	Foxtrot	Rumba	Samba	Argentine tango	Jazz	Tango	Team Freestyle	Charleston	Immunity	Paso doble	Jive	Quickstep	Viennese waltz			Charleston (Note: No scores were received for this dance.)
Chris & Witney	Jive	Cha-cha-cha	Argentine tango	Rumba	Quickstep	Viennese waltz	Team Freestyle	Foxtrot	Foxtrot	Contemp.	Paso doble					Jive
Robert & Kym	Cha-cha-cha	Foxtrot	Rumba	Waltz	Quickstep	Jive	Team Freestyle	Argentine tango	Cha-cha-cha	Contemp.	Samba					Cha-cha-cha
Willow & Mark	Cha-cha-cha	Argentine tango	Paso doble	Contemp.	Foxtrot	Salsa	Team Freestyle	Jazz	Salsa							Foxtrot
Patti & Artem	Foxtrot	Salsa	Cha-cha-cha	Jazz	Waltz	Quickstep	Team Freestyle									Salsa
Suzanne & Tony	Cha-cha-cha	Jive	Samba	Foxtrot	Jazz											Samba
Michael & Peta	Cha-cha-cha	Foxtrot	Salsa	Rumba												
Charlotte & Keo	Jive	Cha-cha-cha	Rumba													Cha-cha-cha
Redfoo & Emma	Cha-cha-cha	Jive														Cha-cha-cha
