= Love Me Like That =

Love Me Like That may refer to:

- Love Me Like That (album), an album by Kira Isabella, or the title song
- "Love Me Like That" (R5 song), 2013
- "Love Me Like That" (The Knocks song)
