= Pass Me By (R5 song) =

Single by R5

from the album Louder
- Released: August 20, 2013
- Recorded: 2013
- Genre: Pop rock
- Length: 3:21
- Label: Hollywood
- Songwriters: Andrew Goldstein; Emanuel Kiriakou; Evan "Kidd" Bogart; Savan Kotecha; Riker Lynch; Rocky Lynch; Rydel Lynch; Ellington Ratliff; Ross Lynch; Brigitte Guitart
- Producers: Kiriakou; Goldstein

R5 singles chronology
"Loud" (2013)	"Pass Me By" (2013)	"(I Can't) Forget About You" (2013)

Music video
- "Pass Me By" on YouTube

"Pass Me By" is a song by American pop rock band, R5. It was released on August 20, 2013, as the second single from their debut studio album, Louder (2013).

== Reception ==
"Pass Me By" received positive reviews from critics. Musichel described the song as an "infectious acoustic pop track". J-14 called the song "catchy" and "fun". Praise for the music video includes a statement by Popstar Online. They commented that the video's cinematography was "stunning".

== Live performances ==
On August 26, 2013, "Pass Me By" was performed in Canadian TV show The Morning Show. They also performed and were interviewed on Good Morning America. The song was performed on Disney Channel's summer special Disney's Aulani Resort in Hawaii, in November 16. On January 20, 2014 the band performed an acoustic version in web show On the Charts, in ClevverTV.

== Music video ==
The official music video was released shortly after the single on August 29, 2013. Directed by Ryan Pallota and shot in the creeks, lakes and mountaintops of Malibu, the new video depicts the band – siblings Riker, Rydel, Rocky and Ross Lynch, along with drummer and friend Ellington Ratliff – rocking "Pass Me By" while frolicking in canyon waterfalls and pools. As twilight fades and the stars come out, the band each find a touch of romance. Also included are shots of the band playing their instruments on a field while goofing around and having fun. Another scene includes the band with their supposed love interests as they sing and gather around a campfire.

== Awards and nominations ==
Title	Year	Category	Result	Ref.
Radio Disney Music Awards	2014	Favorite Roadtrip Song	Nominated	

== Charts ==
Chart (2013)	Peak position
US Pop Digital Songs (Billboard)	50
