= Louder (R5 album) =

Studio album by R5
- Released: September 24, 2013
- Recorded: 2012–13
- Genres: Pop rock; power pop
- Length: 36:33
- Label: Hollywood
- Producers: Emanuel Kiriakou; Andrew Goldstein

R5 chronology
Loud (2013)	Louder (2013)	Live in London (2014)

Singles from Louder
- 1. "Loud" Released: February 19, 2013; 2. "Pass Me By" Released: August 20, 2013; 3. "(I Can't) Forget About You" Released: December 25, 2013; 4. "One Last Dance" Released: May 30, 2014

Louder is the debut studio album by American pop rock band R5, which was released on September 24, 2013 by Hollywood Records. Louder was also released as a deluxe edition, with four extra tracks only available for digital download. As of October 2014, Louder has sold 150,000 physical copies in the US.

== Background and composition ==
"We wanted to put out a fun album," says Rydel Lynch and Ratliff said "We wanted to make an upbeat and inspirational album you want to play 24/7."

Louder is mainly a pop and pop rock record. The album discusses themes such as love, youth and freedom.

== Release ==
A deluxe version was exclusively sold at Target including the song "Wishing I Was 23" produced by Rocky Lynch, a ZinePak exclusively sold at Justice included stickers and the bonus track as well. A deluxe edition of the album was released in Japan in November, which includes another bonus track, "Crazy Stupid Love".

== Chart performance ==
The album debuted on the Billboard 200 at number 24 selling 15,000 copies in first week.

== Reception ==
Professional ratings
Review scores
Source	Rating
Musichel	4/5 stars
AllMusic	3.5/5 stars
Today Online	2/5 stars
Spin or Bin	3/5 stars

Louder received mixed reviews from critics. AllMusic's Tim Sendra praised Louder as a "strong, uncluttered and fun modern pop confection." Also, he praised Rydel, who has a vocal feature in "Love Me Like That". Musichel called Louder R5's impressive "grand entrance into the world of pop music", also adding that "R5's future is set for the sky and beyond." Xinhua of Spin or Bin says the album's "lacks of charisma" but praised Ross', Riker's and Rocky's vocal abilities. Paul Lim, from Singaporean newspaper Today, called the album "immature, repetitive" and "even annoying". He also compared Louder with Katy Perry and Justin Bieber. He concluded saying that the band was "a joke". Megan Phelan from Mountain Weekly News said, "there is not much to differentiate the band's sound from other trendy pop acts." However, she gave the band "extra credit" for playing their instruments.

== Singles ==
- "Loud" was previously released as the lead single from double releases: the EP Loud EP and the album Louder. It was released on February 19, 2013.
- The second single was "Pass Me By", released on August 20, 2013.
- On December 25, 2013, the band released "(I Can't) Forget About You" as the third single.
- "One Last Dance" was released as the fourth and final single on May 30, 2014. All singles were accompanied by their respective music video.

=== Promotional Singles ===
Love Me Like That was released as the only promotional single on September 16, 2013.

== Track listing ==
All tracks produced by Emanuel Kiriakou and Andrew Goldstein, except where noted.

No.	Title	Writer(s)	Producer(s)	Length
1.	"Pass Me By"	Evan “Kidd” Bogart; Andrew Goldstein; Emanuel Kiriakou; Savan Kotecha; R5		3:21
2.	"Forget About You"	Bogart; Goldstein; Kiriakou; R5; Lindy Robbins		3:31
3.	"Ain't No Way We're Goin' Home"	Bogart; Goldstein; Kiriakou		3:06
4.	"I Want U Bad"	Bogart; Goldstein; Kiriakou; Robbins		3:13
5.	"If I Can't Be with You"	Bogart; Goldstein; Kiriakou; Jens Koerkemeier; Tony Oller; R5		2:55
6.	"Love Me Like That"	Bogart; Goldstein; Kiriakou; R5; Robbins		3:21
7.	"One Last Dance"	Bogart; Goldstein; Kiriakou; Robbins		3:21
8.	"Loud"	Bogart; Goldstein; Kiriakou; Robbins		3:26
9.	"Fallin' for You"	Bogart; Goldstein; Kiriakou; Robbins		3:36
10.	"Cali Girls"	Nathaneal Boone; Riker Lynch; Rocky Lynch	Goldstein	3:28
11.	"Here Comes Forever"	Bogart; Goldstein; Kiriakou; Riker Lynch; Rocky Lynch; Ross Lynch		3:15
Total length:				36:33

Digital Deluxe Bonus Tracks
No.	Title	Writer(s)	Length
12.	"Loud" (acoustic)	Bogart; Goldstein; Kiriakou; Robbins	3:26
13.	"Fallin' for You" (acoustic)	Bogart; Goldstein; Kiriakou; Robbins	3:23
14.	"I Want U Bad" (acoustic)	Bogart; Goldstein; Kiriakou; Robbins	3:18
15.	"Here Comes Forever" (acoustic)	Bogart; Goldstein; Kiriakou; Riker Lynch; Rocky Lynch; Ross Lynch	3:14
Total length:			49:54

Target & International Bonus Track
No.	Title	Writer(s)	Producer(s)	Length
12.	"Wishing I Was 23"	Rocky Lynch; Riker Lynch; Boone; Jasmine Ash	Rocky Lynch; Travis "Tronik" Huff	3:34
Total length:				40:07

Japanese Standard Edition
No.	Title	Writer(s)	Length
13.	"Loud" (acoustic)	Bogart; Goldstein; Kiriakou; Robbins	3:25
14.	"Here Comes Forever" (acoustic)	Bogart; Goldstein; Kiriakou; Riker Lynch; Rocky Lynch; Ross Lynch	3:14
15.	"CrzyStpdLuv"	JP Clark; Jason Paul Bonilla; Riker Lynch; Rocky Lynch	2:57
Total length:			49:43

Japanese Deluxe Edition Bonus Tracks
No.	Title	Writer(s)	Length
13.	"Loud" (acoustic)	Bogart; Goldstein; Kiriakou; Robbins	3:25
14.	"I Want U Bad" (acoustic)	Bogart; Goldstein; Kiriakou; Robbins	3:17
15.	"Fallin' for You" (acoustic)	Bogart; Goldstein; Kiriakou; Robbins	3:22
16.	"CrzyStpdLuv"	JP Clark; Jason Paul Bonilla; Riker Lynch; Rocky Lynch	2:57
17.	"Christmas Is Coming"		3:08
Total length:			56:16

Notes:

- All physical copies of the album list the second track as "Forget About You"; upon its release as a single, it was retitled "(I Can't) Forget About You".

== Personnel ==
Credits for Louder adapted from Allmusic.

- Evan "Kidd" Bogart - Composer, Executive Producer
- Nathaniel Boone - Composer
- Mike Daly - A&R
- Chris Gehringer - Mastering
- Andrew Goldstein - Composer, Editing, Engineer, Instrumentation, Producer
- John Hanes - Mixing Assistant, Mixing Engineer
- Emanuel Kiriakou - Composer, Executive Producer, Instrumentation, Producer
- Jens Koerkeimer - Composer, Editing, Engineer
- Denis Kosiak - Assistant Engineer
- Savan Kotecha - Composer
- Mark Lynch - Management
- Riker Lynch - Bass, Composer, Vocals
- Rocky Lynch - Composer, Guitar, Vocals
- Ross Lynch - Composer, Guitar, Vocals
- Rydel Lynch - Keyboards, Vocals
- Stormie Lynch - Stylist
- Tony Oller - Composer
- R5 - Composer, Primary Artist
- Ellington Ratliff - Drums, Vocals
- Andre Recke - Management
- Ed Reyes - Keyboards, Vocals
- Lindy Robbins - Composer
- Anabel Sinn - Art Direction, Design
- Dave Snow - Creative Director
- Pat Thrall - Editing, Engineer
- Mio Vukovic - A&R
- Sarah Yeo - A&R

== Charts ==
Chart (2013)	Peak position
Belgian Albums Chart (Flanders)	47
Belgian Albums Chart (Wallonia)	158
French Albums Chart	121
Irish Albums Chart	59
Italian Albums Chart	11
Japanese Albums Chart	60
Polish Albums Chart	26
Portuguese Albums Chart	13
UK Albums (OCC)	149
US Billboard 200	24
