= One Last Dance (R5 song) =

Single by R5

from the album Louder
- Released: May 30, 2014
- Recorded: 2013
- Genre: Pop rock
- Length: 3:20
- Label: Hollywood
- Songwriters: Evan "Kidd" Bogart; Emanuel Kiriakou; Andrew Goldstein; Lindy Robbins
- Producers: Kiriakou; Goldstein

R5 singles chronology
"(I Can't) Forget About You" (2013)	"One Last Dance" (2014)	"Heart Made Up on You" (2014)

"One Last Dance" is a song by American pop rock band R5, taken from their debut album Louder. It was released as the fourth and final single off the album on May 30, 2014.

== Writing and release ==
Lyrically, "One Last Dance" talks about breaking. To Seventeen Magazine, Ellington Ratliff said the inspiration for the song came from the happy memories of each break. "It's about ending on a good note and still being friends. Maybe you're going to college or going to the military. You want to remember the happy times you've had together instead of dwelling on the sad." Riker and Ellington said that "One Last Dance" was their favorite song from Louder. On May 30, 2014 the song was released to digital download. Strictly Leisure of Love Music Love Life said the song was "catchy" and the "story that captures your heart". Xinhua of Spin Or Bin Music wasn't positive and criticized the vocals and lyrics. However, the critic also said the song has "sweet melodic textures" and a "romantic feel".

Fanlala said the video was "their greatest music video to date". The portal also positived the full work of the band. "There's so much to appreciate when it comes to being an R5 fan. Amazing music, amazing band members, amazing fans."

== Live performances ==
The song was performed on Disney Channel's summer special Disney’s Aulani Resort in Hawaii, on November 27, 2013.

== Music video ==
The band released the official music video on May 30, 2014 and was directed by Michel Sandy. The video contains scenes of the band in Europe in some famous places like the Eiffel Tower, in France, the streets of Italy and a dinner in London. All scenes were shot in black-and-white.

== Release history ==
Country	Date	Format(s)	Label
United States	May 30, 2014	Digital download	Hollywood
