= Rydel Lynch =

American singer and actress (born 1993)

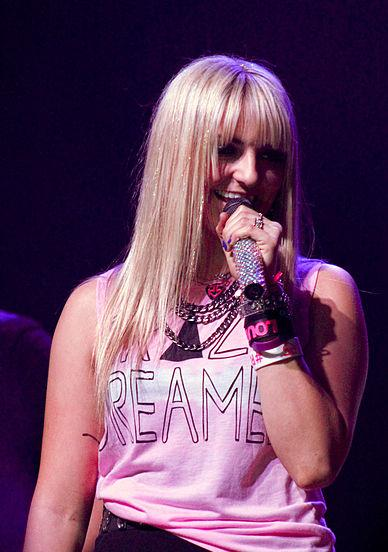
- Lynch in 2013
- Born: Rydel Mary Lynch; August 9, 1993 (age 33); Littleton, Colorado, U.S.
- Occupation: musician
- Years active: 2009–present
- Spouse: Capron Funk (m. 2020)
- Children: 4
- Relatives: Riker Lynch (brother); Rocky Lynch (brother); Ross Lynch (brother); Derek Hough (cousins); Julianne Hough (cousins)
- Musical career
- Instruments: keyboards; percussion; drums
- Website: shoprydel.com

Rydel Mary Lynch (born August 9, 1993) is an American musician. She is one of the founding members of the band R5.

== Early life ==
Lynch was born August 9, 1993, in Littleton, Colorado, the daughter of Stormie (née De St. Jeor) and Mark Lynch. She is the second oldest child and only girl of five siblings. Her brothers are Riker, Rocky, Ross, and Ryland Lynch. She learned to play the keyboard, double shaker and the tambourine, as well as learning how to dance. She has appeared in several commercials. Her second cousins are entertainers Derek and Julianne Hough, their maternal grandmothers being sisters.

== Career ==
=== Acting ===
She made her acting debut in Sunday School Musical as a Crossroads Choir Member. She appeared in School Gyrls as a cheerleader along with her brother Riker Lynch. She appeared in A Day as Holly's Kids as Holly's Actual Kid 2. She appeared in the pilot episode of the television series Bunheads as a Vegas Showgirl. Rydel told Teen Ink about Bunheads, "I'm one of the dancers and if it gets picked up, it'll air on ABC Family." She also appeared in an episode of Violetta in 2015 and performed "Heart Made Up on You" with R5.

=== Music ===
In 2009, R5 was formed with Rydel, her brothers Riker, Rocky and Ross Lynch, and family friend Ellington Ratliff with her younger brother Ryland Lynch as their manager. In April 2012, R5 signed a deal with Hollywood Records. They went on a 10-day tour entitled West Coast Tour in which she regularly performed a cover of "Call Me Maybe". In early 2013, R5 released a four-song EP entitled Loud.

Their first studio album, Louder was released on September 24, 2013. Rydel spoke about the album, saying "We wanted to put out a fun album." Rydel was featured as the lead vocalist in the songs "Never" from R5's debut EP Ready Set Rock and "Love Me Like That" which was featured on Louder. The song, "Love Me Like That" is described as the "cheerleader hip-hop jammer" and "an irresistible party track that's a whole lotta rhythm and a little bit blues". The song received generally positive reviews. R5 went on their fifth tour titled Louder Tour with Rydel regularly performing "Love Me Like That" and covers of songs such as a duet of "Sleeping with a Friend" by Neon Trees with Ellington Ratliff. Rydel and along with R5 won the special award Radio Disney Showstopper at the Radio Disney Music Awards. On July 22, 2014, R5 released their new EP called Heart Made Up on You.

Lynch had two songs on R5's second studio album, Sometime Last Night. The first, "Lightning Strikes", was performed regularly on the "Sometime Last Night" tour. The second, "Never Be The Same", was on the deluxe version of the album, titled Sometime Last Night Special Edition. In 2012, R5 appeared as Ross Lynch's band for the music video of the song "Heard It on the Radio". Also in 2012, Lynch made an appearance in Taylor Mathews's "Head Over Feeling" music video. She was featured in the R5 movie All Day, All Night which was released to limited theaters on April 16, 2015. The film was shot documentary style and showed the band living and working together while writing and recording Sometime Last Night.

Lynch cites All Time Low, Neon Trees and The Script as musical influences, and cites Neon Trees and Walk the Moon as her favorite bands.

== Personal life ==
On February 9, 2020, Lynch became engaged to YouTuber Capron Funk. They were married on September 12, 2020, in Phoenix, Arizona. They have two sons born in 2021 and 2023, respectively, and two daughters born in 2022 and 2025.

== Filmography ==
=== Films ===
Year	Title	Role	Notes
2009	School Gyrls	Cheerleader	Uncredited

=== Television ===
Year	Title	Role	Notes
2009	So You Think You Can Dance	Enaemble dancer (uncredited)	Episode: "Top 18"
2011	A Day as Holly's Kids	Holly's Kid #2	Episode: "Pilot"
