= Loud (EP) =

EP by R5
- Released: February 19, 2013
- Recorded: 2012
- Genre: Pop rock; power pop
- Length: 13:30
- Label: Hollywood
- Producer: Emanuel Kiriakou; Andrew Goldstein

R5 chronology
Ready Set Rock (2010)	Loud (2013)	Louder (2013)

Singles from Loud (EP)
- 1. "Loud" Released: February 19, 2013

Loud is the second EP by American pop rock band R5. It was released on February 19, 2013 through Hollywood Records. It was released on United Kingdom and Ireland on February 28, 2013. As of 2014, the EP has sold 50,000 copies in the US.

== Singles ==
"Loud" was released as the first single from the EP. The music video was released on February 22, 2013.

== Track listing ==
All tracks written by Evan "Kidd" Bogart, Andrew Goldstein, Emanuel Kiriakou and Lindy Robbins except where noted. All tracks produced by Kiriakou and Goldstein.

No.	Title	Writer(s)	Length
1.	"Loud"	Andrew Goldstein, Emanuel Kiriakou, Evan "Kidd" Bogart & Lindy Robbins	3:26
2.	"Fallin' for You"	Andrew Goldstein, Emanuel Kiriakou, Evan "Kidd" Bogart & Lindy Robbins	3:36
3.	"I Want U Bad"	Andrew Goldstein, Emanuel Kiriakou, Evan "Kidd" Bogart & Lindy Robbins	3:13
4.	"Here Comes Forever"	Andrew Goldstein, Emanuel Kiriakou, Evan "Kidd" Bogart, Riker Lynch, Rocky Lynch & Ross Lynch	3:15
Total length:			13:30

Spanish Version Bonus Tracks
No.	Title	Writer(s)	Length
5.	"Cali Girls"	Nathanael Boone, Riker Lynch & Rocky Lynch	3:28
6.	"Loud" (acoustic)	Andrew Goldstein, Emanuel Kiriakou, Evan "Kidd" Bogart & Lindy Robbins	3:25
Total length:			20:23

== Charts ==
Chart (2013)	Peak position
Spanish Albums Chart	38
US Billboard 200	69

== Release history ==
Country	Date	Format(s)	Label
United States	February 19, 2013	digital download	Hollywood Records
United Kingdom	February 28, 2014	digital download	Hollywood Records
Ireland	February 28, 2014	digital download	Hollywood Records
