= Fanclubwallet =

Canadian musician

Hannah Judge, better known by her stage name fanclubwallet, is a Canadian musician from Ottawa. Judge gained attention after releasing a cover of Talking Heads' song "This Must Be the Place (Naive Melody)". Under the fanclubwallet moniker, Judge has released two albums and three EPs. Judge’s first EP, Hurt is Boring, was released in 2021. Judge released their debut album as fanclubwallet, You Have Got To Be Kidding Me, in 2022. Also in 2022, NME named fanclubwallet was named one of the best acts at SXSW that year. In 2024, Judge released another EP titled Our Bodies Paint Traffic Lines.

== Discography ==
Studio albums

- You Have Got to Be Kidding Me (2022)
- Living While Dying (2025)

EPs

- Hurt is Boring (2021)
- Small Songs Vol. 1 (2023)
- Our Bodies Paint Traffic Lines (2024)
