= Loud (R5 song) =

Single by R5

from the album Loud and Louder
- Released: February 19, 2013
- Recorded: 2012
- Genre: Pop rock
- Length: 3:26
- Label: Hollywood
- Songwriters: Emanuel Kiriakou; Evan "Kidd" Bogart; Andrew Goldstein; Lindy Robbins
- Producers: Kiriakou; Goldstein

R5 singles chronology
"Say You'll Stay" (2011)	"Loud" (2013)	"Pass Me By" (2013)

"Loud" is the debut single by American pop rock band R5, from their second EP of the same name. It was released on February 19, 2013, digitally and physically with the rest of the EP's tracks and was later included on the band's debut full-length album Louder (2013) as the lead single.

== Reception ==
Loud has received generally positive reviews from both fans and critics. Musichel stated that all four songs of the album are "contagious tunes that are sure to hook their listeners." Matt Collar from AllMusic said, "with [its] mixture of dance and rock-oriented material, R5 find a nice balance between the sound of Maroon 5 and One Direction," and called the track very "infectious". ClevverTV talked about the music video, stating that "the vibe is just really upbeat". Fanlala stated that it is "one of the most fun music videos that [they had] ever seen".

== Live performance ==
On July 7, 2013, "Loud" was performed live for the first time on the British TV show Blue Peter. On August 26, they performed on Canadian TV show The Morning Show.

== Music video ==
The official music video was revealed on R5's website and Vevo channel on February 22, 2013. It depicts the band going around downtown LA, followed by a group of friends and having a good time. It also features the band performing the song on a rooftop, overlooking the city, as the sun goes down because as the song states, "Shout it out from the rooftops,". A few clips of the band having a blast — like BMX and skateboarding, partying, playing instruments, defying gravity, jumping on trampolines, falling in love — can be seen as well. The video was shot at downtown LA and was directed by Ryder Bayliss.

== Awards and nominations ==
Title	Year	Category	Result	Ref.
Radio Disney Music Awards	2013	Best Acoustic Performance	Nominated	
Radio Disney Music Awards	2014	That's My Jam	Nominated	

== Charts ==
Chart (2013)	Peak position
Japan Hot 100	72
UK Singles (Official Charts Company)	199

== Release history ==
Country	Date	Format(s)	Label
United States	February 19, 2013	digital download	Hollywood Records
Japan	September 9, 2013	digital download	Hollywood Records
New Zealand	January 13, 2014	digital download	Hollywood Records
