= R5 (band) =

American pop rock band (2009–2018)

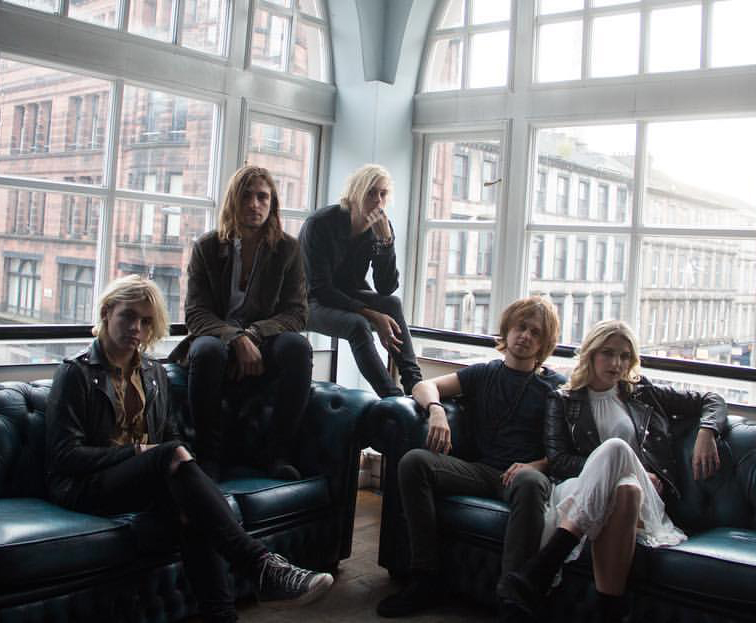
- R5 in 2015. Left to right: Ross Lynch, Rocky Lynch, Riker Lynch, Ellington Ratliff and Rydel Lynch.

Background information
- Origin: Los Angeles, California, U.S.
- Genres: Pop rock; power pop
- Years active: 2009–2018
- Label: Hollywood
- Spinoffs: The Driver Era
- Past members: Ross Lynch; Riker Lynch; Rocky Lynch; Rydel Lynch; Ellington Ratliff

R5 was an American pop rock band formed in Los Angeles in 2009. The band consisted of Ross Lynch (vocals/rhythm guitar), Riker Lynch (bass guitar/vocals), Rocky Lynch (lead guitar/vocals), Rydel Lynch (keyboards/vocals), and Ellington Ratliff (drums/vocals). They released their first EP, Ready Set Rock, on March 9, 2010, but it was removed once Ross got his role on the Disney Channel show Austin and Ally. They then released the EP Loud on February 19, 2013. Since releasing their debut album, Louder, on September 24, 2013, which peaked at 24 on the Billboard 200, followed by their world tour. Their second album, Sometime Last Night, was released on July 10, 2015, and debuted at 6 on the US Billboard 200, and reached the top 20 in five other countries. They have also released five EPs, eleven singles, and a documentary. In 2018, the band disbanded and Ross and Rocky formed the duo The Driver Era.

== History ==
=== 2009–2011: Formation and Ready Set Rock ===
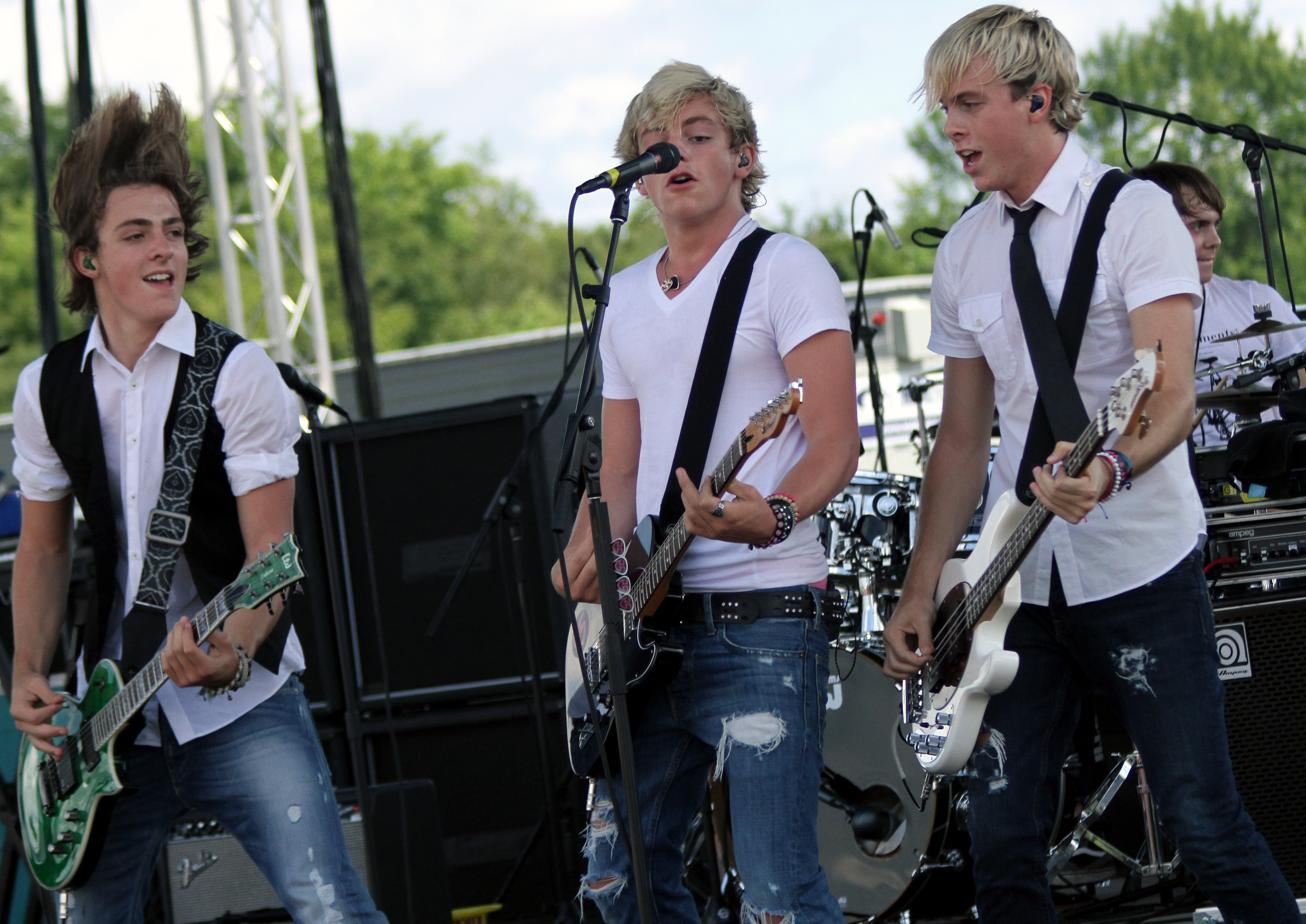
Rocky, Ross and Riker at R5's first East Coast show in 2012 (New Jersey)

R5 is made up of siblings Riker, Rocky, Ross and Rydel Lynch, and their family friend Ellington Ratliff, whom they met at a California dance studio called the Rage. About a year after meeting, they asked Ratliff to join the band. While living in Colorado, the Lynch siblings went to a performing arts school. They used to put on shows for their family and charged them at least a dollar to watch them perform in their basement. At age 16, Riker decided he wanted to move to Los Angeles to pursue an acting career. Their parents, Mark and Stormie, moved the entire family there in order to stay together. Shortly after the move, the siblings began appearing in commercials, while Rocky began teaching himself, Ross and Riker how to play guitar.

In 2009, R5 officially started the band and debuted their YouTube web series, R5 TV, documenting the band's day-to-day life and career beginning. On September 5, they released their first music video, "Without You", directed by Riker. The band self-released a five-track EP titled Ready Set Rock on March 9, 2010, consisting of songs written primarily by Riker, Rocky, Rydel, vocal coach Mauli B, and band coach E-Vega, who produced the EP. No official single was released from EP. On September 4 they released a music video for "Can't Get Enough of You" and, in the next month, for "Never". On July 26, 2011, the band released their debut promotional single, "Say You'll Stay". The music video was released on August 3. During these early years they played sets throughout Southern California at venues, including the Orange County Fair, the San Diego County Fair, the San Diego IndieFest, the Knitting Factory, and Six Flags Magic Mountain.

=== 2012–2014: Loud and Louder ===
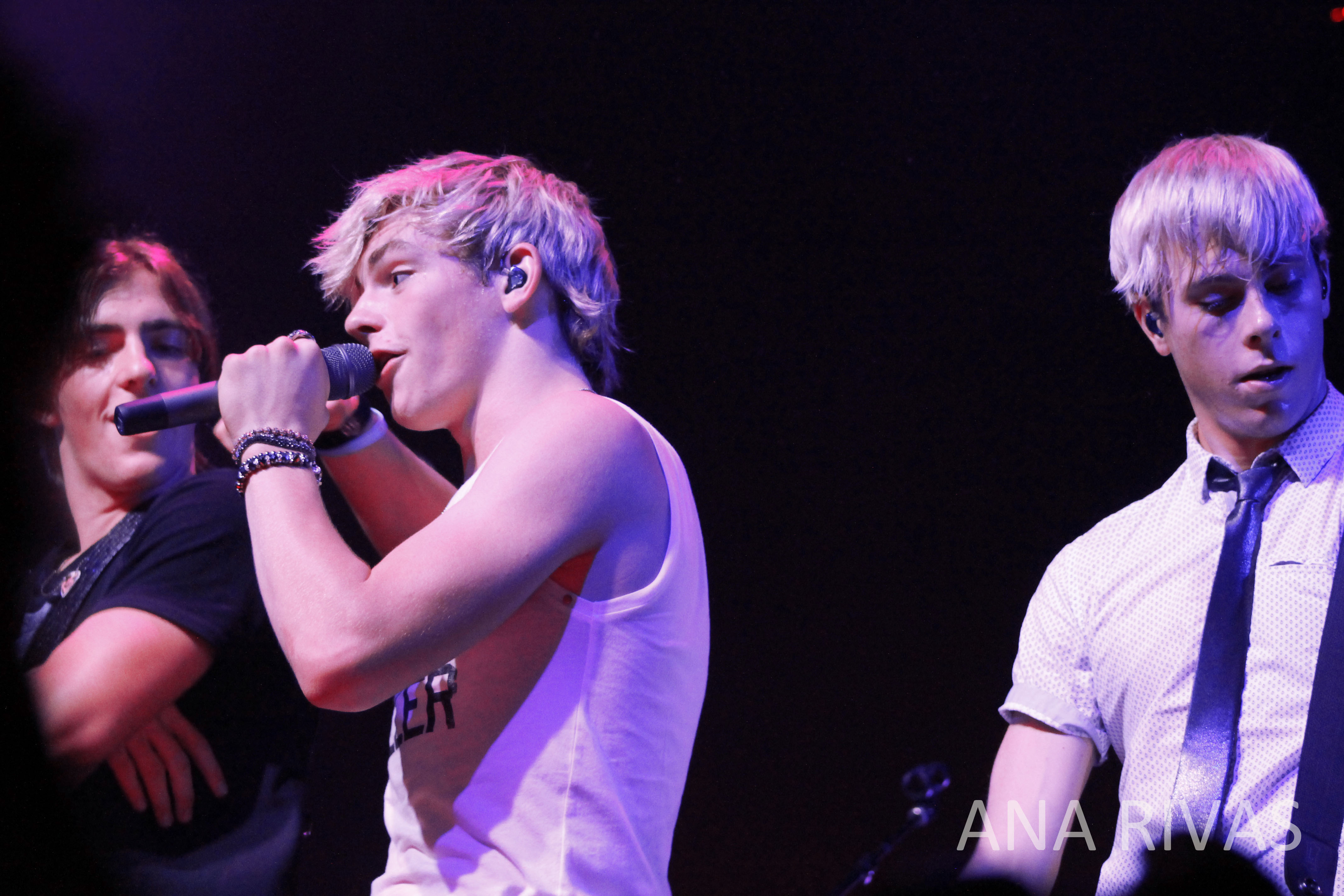
Rocky, Ross and Riker in 2013

In April 2012, the band members announced via their website that they had signed a record deal with Hollywood Records, and that they were planning for their first mini-tour in May. They collaborated on charity single "Make Some Noise" for Family Channel's Stand Up philanthropic campaign.

Their debut tour, West Coast Tour, started on May 3, 2012, and traveled only to west coast. The second tour, East Coast Tour started on December 15, in Jamestown, New York, and traveled only to east coast serving to promote the band with the younger crowd. They also held three special concerts, titled 3M Tour, in Madison, Wisconsin on November 18, 2012, Milwaukee on November 19 and Minneapolis on November 20. On February 19, 2013, they released the four-song EP Loud, which charted in the top 3 of the iTunes chart within 24 hours of its release. One of the songs on the EP, "Here Comes Forever", was written by Riker, Rocky and Ross. The R5's debut single, "Loud", was released on February 13 and also serves as the first single from the debut album. The song peaked at number 72 in Japan and 199 in United Kingdom. On August 16, 2013, "Pass Me By", the second single from their debut album, Louder, was released.

Louder was released on September 24, 2013, and climbed its way to number 2 on the iTunes charts, being classified as a "chart-topper" on the iTunes End of the Year Album list. On December 25, 2013, the third single from Louder was released, titled "(I Can't) Forget About You" and, shortly after, the official video was released on the band's website. The band had songwriting credits on 6 of the 11 songs on Louder. The album includes all four songs from the Loud EP. In March 2013, R5 embarked on a 50-date North American tour, and later that year they toured in Australia. On February 5, 2014, the band embarked on the first leg of its first world tour starting in Warsaw, Poland. They toured numerous countries in Europe including: Norway, Sweden, Denmark, Germany, Netherlands, Belgium, Italy, Spain, France, the United Kingdom, Ireland and Israel. The band also performed at the annual White House Easter Egg Roll and at the Radio Disney Music Awards. On April 24, 2014, the band appeared on Ryan Seacrest's popular KIIS-FM radio show, On Air with Ryan Seacrest, where it was announced that they would be the opening act at the Wango Tango Music Festival. The band released "One Last Dance" as fourth and final single from Louder on May 30, 2014. On June 9, 2014, they released the music video for "Rock That Rock", a song written for Candymania's Ring Pop, featuring fan content.

=== 2014–2016: Heart Made Up on You and Sometime Last Night ===
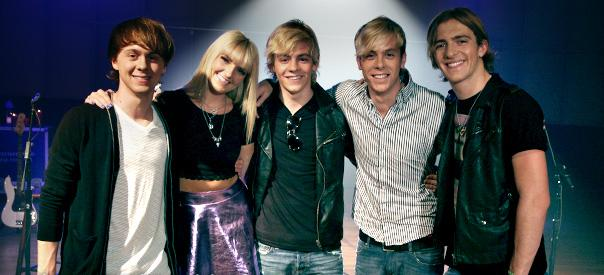
R5 members in 2014

Their third EP, Heart Made Up on You, was released on July 22, 2014, and consists of the songs "Heart Made Up On You," "Things Are Looking Up," "Easy Love," and "Stay With Me." The music video for "Heart Made Up on You" was released on August 1, 2014. R5's second full-length album, Sometime Last Night, was released on July 10, 2015. Riker shared in interviews that their second album was "more mature," and that Ross was one of the key writers on the record. Ross stated that, earlier in the year, the band had an entire record finished and mastered, but they had second thoughts and scrapped it, feeling it was too similar to Louder and didn't accurately reflect the direction they wanted to go in. The album was originally going to include all four songs from the Heart Made Up on You EP. The band rewrote the entire album, taking a bigger role in the album's composition, writing most of the songs on the album. Some of the bonus tracks from the deluxe edition of Sometime Last Night were tracks intended for the original album. On November 15, 2014, the band released the album's lead single, "Smile", and performed the song at the American Music Awards pre-show.

"Let's Not Be Alone Tonight", the second single, was released on February 13, 2015. On March 4, 2015, the group hosted an intimate "Hollywood Hang" at the Roxy in Los Angeles. On April 16, 2015, the band's concert movie, R5: All Day, All Night, was screened in select Regal cinemas for one night only. In the documentary, Rydel and Ellington confirmed that they are in a relationship. "All Night" was released as the third single on June 2, along with the album's iTunes pre-order. On June 11, R5 made their late night debut, performing "All Night" on Jimmy Kimmel Live!. On April 6, 2015, R5 announced the first leg of their Sometime Last Night Tour. Following the conclusion of their summer tour, R5 released R5 Live: Sometime Last Night At the Greek Theatre, a two-disc DVD set featuring 80-minutes of live music and exclusive behind-the-scenes content. They toured around Europe, Australia, Asia, North America and South America, and wrapped up the last show of the tour on March 17, 2016, in Sioux City, Iowa. Jacob Whitesides joined the band as opener for first leg of the US tour, Jack and Jack opened for them in Australia, Max Schneider opened for the second leg of the American tour and DJ Ryland joined the band for the whole tour. On June 30, 2015, "F.E.E.L. G.O.O.D." was released on iTunes as an instant grat track for pre-orders.

On July 8, 2015, the music video for "All Night" was released. On October 17, 2015, R5 released a music video for "I Know You Got Away". The video was shot during the European leg of the Sometime Last Night Tour and was directed by Ross and edited by Rydel. On December 18, 2015, R5 premiered a music video for "Wild Hearts" on Live Nation TV. The video was directed by the band during their trip to Las Vegas for Rocky's 21st birthday. In June 2016, R5 announced that they would headline Youth Music Zone in Kingston, Jamaica, on July 9, 2016. The band performed at Summer Sonic Festival in Tokyo, Japan on August 20, 2016, and in Osaka on August 21, 2016. It was their third time to visit Japan. After the festival, the members except for Rocky went back to Los Angeles, but Rocky stayed in Japan for about a few weeks to be with his girlfriend, who stayed in Japan at that time. Other artists on the lineup include Underworld, Fergie and Weezer.

=== 2017–2018: New Addictions and hiatus ===
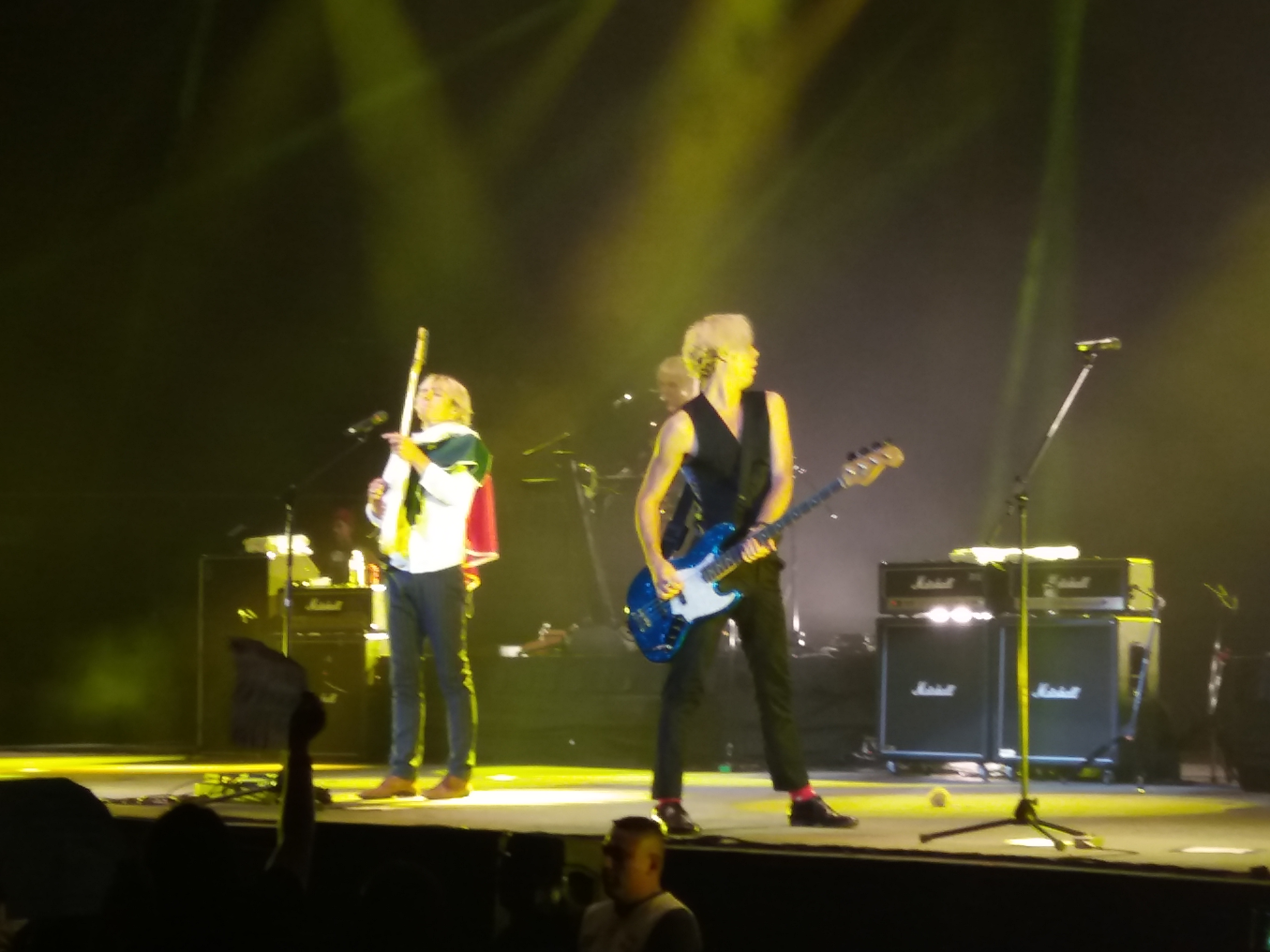
R5 performing in 2017

On March 16, 2017, Riker announced that the band was recording new songs. On April 5, they announced their fourth EP, New Addictions, which was released on May 12, 2017. The five-song EP includes the single "If", the original songs "Red Velvet", "Lay Your Head Down" and "Trading Time", and "Need You Tonight", a cover of the INXS single from their 1987 album Kick. Shortly after the release of New Addictions, the new single "Hurts Good" was released The band also announced their New Addictions Tour, a US tour which begins on June 17, 2017, and toured to Mexico, Europe, South America, and other countries.

After the single and music video called "Hurts Good" in 2017, R5 didn't release any more songs or music videos.

On February 1, 2018, R5 posted on their YouTube a video called The Last Show. Then on March 1, 2018, R5's Instagram and Twitter handles were changed to The Driver Era and all of R5's previous posts were deleted. On March 2, 2018, they announced that the band was going on a temporary hiatus and that The Driver Era would be a band with only Ross and Rocky.

On June 11, 2023, R5 reunited on stage at the Greek Theatre during The Driver Era's headlining show, to perform their song "All Night".

== Musical influences ==
The band has cited The Beatles, Fall Out Boy, The Rolling Stones, Michael Jackson, Bruce Springsteen, Elvis Presley, The Beach Boys, INXS, Jimi Hendrix, Led Zeppelin, Prince and Queen as big musical influences. They have also mentioned more recent artists, including McFly, The Killers, Neon Trees, Walk the Moon, Maroon 5, Jack White, Bruno Mars and The Script.

== Band members ==
- Ross Lynch – lead vocals, rhythm guitar, occasional piano
- Riker Lynch – bass, vocals
- Rocky Lynch – lead guitar, vocals
- Rydel Lynch – keyboards, percussion, backing vocals
- Ellington Ratliff – drums, backing vocals

== Discography ==
- Louder (2013)
- Sometime Last Night (2015)

== Awards and nominations ==
Year	Award	Category	Nominee	Result	Ref.
2013	Next Big Thing Awards	Next Big Thing	R5	Won	
2013	Radio Disney Music Awards	Best Music Group	R5	Nominated	
2013	Radio Disney Music Awards	Best Acoustic Performance	"Loud"	Nominated	
2013	Radio Disney Music Awards	Funniest Celebrity Take	Air Guitar	Nominated	
2013	Teen Icon Awards	Iconic Band / Group	R5	Nominated	
2014	Radio Disney Music Awards	Best Music Group	R5	Nominated	
2014	Radio Disney Music Awards	Best Song to Rock Out to With Your BFF	"Loud"	Nominated	
2014	Radio Disney Music Awards	Favorite Roadtrip Song	"Pass Me By"	Nominated	
2014	Radio Disney Music Awards	Show Stopper Award	R5	Won	
2014	Vevo LIFT Fan Vote Awards	Vevo LIFT Artist	R5	Nominated	
2014	Young Hollywood Awards	Social Media Superstar	R5	Nominated	
2014	Teen Choice Award	Choice Music Group	R5	Nominated	
2015	Radio Disney Music Awards	Best Song That Makes You Smile	"Smile"	Nominated	
2015	Radio Disney Music Awards	Fiercest Fans	R5Family	Nominated	
2016	Radio Disney Music Awards	Best Music Group	R5	Nominated	

== Concert tours ==
Headlining

- West Coast Tour (2012)
- East Coast Tour (2012)
- Loud Tour (2013)
- Louder World Tour (2013–14)
- Live on Tour (2014)
- Sometime Last Night Tour (2015–16)
- New Addictions Tour (2017–18)

Promotional

- 3M Tour (2012)
- Dancing Out My Pants Tour (2013)

== Bibliography ==
Year	Title
2013	On the Road
2014	Live on Tour
