= Riker Lynch =

American singer and actor

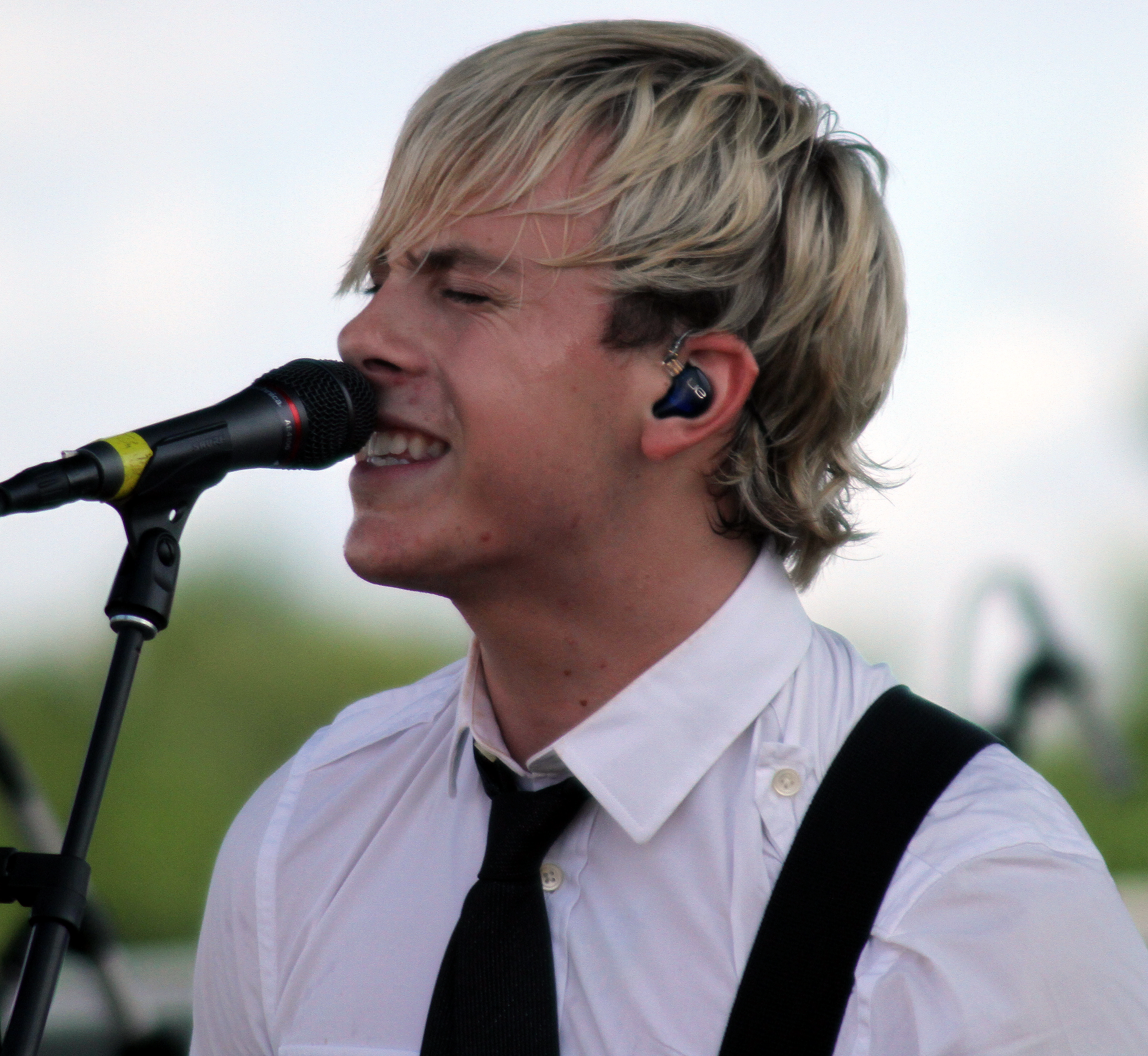
- Lynch in 2012
- Born: Riker Anthony Lynch; November 8, 1991 (age 35); Littleton, Colorado, U.S.
- Occupations: Actor; singer
- Years active: 2009–present
- Spouse: Savannah Latimer (m. 2019; div. 2025)
- Family: Ross Lynch (brother); Rydel Lynch (sister); Rocky Lynch (brother); Derek Hough (second cousin); Julianne Hough (second cousin)
- Musical career
- Genres: Pop rock; pop
- Instruments: Bass guitar; vocals
- Formerly of: R5
- Website: r5rocks.com

Riker Anthony Lynch (born November 8, 1991) is an American singer and actor. He was previously cast as Jeff, one of the members of the Dalton Academy Warblers singing group, on Fox's television series Glee. He finished in second place on season 20 of Dancing with the Stars with Allison Holker as his dance partner.

He was one of the lead singers and the bassist in R5 with his brothers Ross and Rocky, sister Rydel, and family friend Ellington Ratliff. He now has a band of his own called Riker and The Beachcombers.

Riker married Savannah Latimer on September 20, 2019. In July 2025, Lynch and Latimer released a joint statement announcing their divorce via Instagram story.

== Early life ==
Riker was born in Littleton, Colorado, to Stormie (née De St. Jeor) and Mark Lynch. He is the eldest of five children. He started singing and acting at Colorado Productions and later began taking dance lessons. In 2007, he and his family moved to Los Angeles to pursue his dream of working in the entertainment industry.

== Career ==
=== Acting ===
Riker was one of the Dalton Academy Warblers on Fox's hit show Glee. He was introduced as Jeff in the season 2 episode "Special Education", appearing thereafter as one of the Warbler singers in eleven more episodes through seasons 2, 3 and 4. He also appeared as a Warbler in the 2011 edition of the Glee Live! In Concert! tour, which performed from May through July 3, 2011 in the U.S., Canada, England and Ireland. A movie was filmed of the tour concert, which includes scenes with Riker performing as Jeff: Glee: The 3D Concert Movie was released on August 12, 2011. The film was released on DVD and Blu-ray on December 20, 2011 under the title Glee: The Concert Movie.

=== Music ===
Riker is the bassist and one of the lead vocalists in the band R5 with his family members Rocky, Rydel, and Ross also their best friend Ratliff. In April 2012, R5 announced via the band's website that they had signed a record deal with Hollywood Records and that they were planning for their first club tour in May. After the tour, R5 played numerous summer shows across the US and in Canada. In September two R5 songs were released on the Austin & Ally Soundtrack. R5 also came out with an EP called Loud on February 19, 2013. Their first full-length album, Louder, was released September 24, 2013. The album includes the four songs from the EP, and their single, "Pass Me By".

In 2022, he competed in NBC's American Song Contest, representing Colorado. He placed second at the grand final to AleXa.

=== Other ventures ===
On February 24, 2015, Lynch was announced as one of the celebrities who will participate on the 20th season of Dancing with the Stars. He was paired with professional dancer Allison Holker. On May 19, 2015, Lynch and Holker finished the competition in second place, losing to actress Rumer Willis. He later returned during season 27 to be a trio partner to Milo Manheim and Witney Carson.

== Filmography ==
=== Film ===
Year	Title	Role	Notes
2010	Suicide Dolls	Hippie Kid	
2010	School Gyrls	Paul	
2011	Glee: The 3D Concert Movie	Jeff	
2012	Lost Angeles	Johnny	
2018	Colossal Youth	Greg Randle	
2019	Voyeur	Danny	
2019	Turnover	Henry	

=== Television ===
Year	Title	Role	Notes
2009	So You Think You Can Dance	Ensemble dancer	Episode: "Top 16"
2010	Zeke and Luther	Goin' Zoomin' member	Episode: "Goin' Zoomin'"
2010–2012	Glee	Jeff	Recurring role (Season 2–4)
2013	Passport to Explore	Presenter	
2013	Wedding Band	Michael Krush	Episode: "Get Down on It"
2015	Dancing With The Stars	Contestant	Season 20
2020	Chilling Adventures of Sabrina	Trash	Episode: "The Returned"
2022	American Song Contest	Contestant	

=== Internet ===
Year	Title	Role	Notes
2013	Buffering	Martin Riggs	Episode: "All Part of the Plan"

== Discography ==
=== Singles ===
Title	Year
"Sex on the Beach"	2019
"She Just Wants to Be Famous"	2019
"Rita"	2020
"Escape"	2020
"Feel The Love	2022
"Remedy"	2022
