= Andrew Goldstein =

American lacrosse player

Andrew Scott Goldstein (born March 25, 1983, in Milton, Massachusetts) is the first American male team-sport professional athlete to be openly gay during his playing career. He came out publicly in 2003 and was drafted by his hometown team, the Boston Cannons of Major League Lacrosse, in 2005. Goldstein played goaltender for the Long Island Lizards from 2005 to 2007, appearing in two games in 2006.

A two-time All-American at Dartmouth College, in 2003 Goldstein led the Big Green to the Ivy League title, earning a spot in the Division I tournament, the only in the school's history. In the first-round game at lacrosse power Syracuse, down one goal, Goldstein left the crease after a save, ran the length of the field, and scored a goal. It was the first goal by a goalie at the NCAA tournament in nearly 30 years. Dartmouth ended up losing 13–11.

Goldstein came out to his teammates that summer. He made headlines off the field in 2005 when ESPN concluded that he was "the most accomplished male, team-sport athlete in North America to be openly gay during his playing career."

In 2006, Goldstein was honored by being named to the OUT 100 and receiving a prestigious GLAAD Media Award for the feature entitled "Andrew Goldstein" which aired on ESPN's SportsCenter. In 2013, Goldstein was inducted into the inaugural class of the National Gay and Lesbian Sports Hall of Fame.

Goldstein hails from a family of talented athletes, his sister played hockey for Brown University while his brother played lacrosse for Amherst College. Their father, Irwin Goldstein, who played hockey for Brown as well as McGill University, is an internationally renowned physician who was the lead author of the first paper on Viagra as it applied to erectile dysfunction.

After studying biochemistry and molecular biology at Dartmouth, Goldstein received his Ph.D. in biology at UCLA with a specific focus on cancer. He is now an Associate Professor and stem cell researcher at UCLA.

Andrew Goldstein's Erdős number is three, based on a 2016 co-authored publication with Raphael David Levine.
