= Illusion (disambiguation) =

An illusion is a distortion of the senses.

Illusion or Illusions may also refer to:

== Arts, entertainment and media ==
=== Film ===
- Illusion (1929 film), an American film starring Buddy Rogers
- Illusion (1967 film), a Croatian film
- Illusion (2004 film), a film starring Kirk Douglas
- Illusions (1930 film), a French silent comedy film
- Illusions (1982 film), a film by Julie Dash

=== Gaming ===
- Illusion (video game series), a video game series by Sega
- Illusions (video game), a 1984 ColecoVision game
- Pinball Illusions, a 1995 computer game

=== Literature ===
- Illusion (short story), a 1927 short story by Jean Rhys
- The Illusion (novel), a 1999 Animorphs novel by K. A. Applegate
- Illusions (Bach novel), a 1977 novel by Richard Bach
- Illusions (Pike novel), a 2011 novel by Aprilynne Pike
- Illusions, a 1987 novel by Charlotte Vale Allen
- Illusions, a 1997 novel by Janet Dailey
- Illusions, a 2000 novel by Jean Saunders

=== Music ===
==== Bands ====
- Illusion (band), British progressive rock band formed in 1977
- The Illusion (band), American psychedelic hard rock band formed in 1969

==== Albums ====
- Illusion (Renaissance album), 1971
- Illusion (Shahin Najafi album), 2009
- Illusion (Spoken album), 2013
- Illusion (Poor Moon EP), 2012
- Illusion (ZE:A EP), 2013
- Illusions (Arthur Blythe album), 1980, and the title track
- Illusions (Borealis album), 2018
- Illusions (Eliane Elias album), 1986
- Illusions (George Duke album), 1995
- Illusions (Michale Graves album), 2007
- Illusions (Sadus album), 1988
- Illusions (Thomas Bergersen album), 2011
- The Illusion (album), by The Illusion, 1969
- Illusion, an unreleased album by Faith Hill
- Illusion, a 2016 album by Gaby Moreno
- Illusions, a 1992 album by Ute Lemper
- Illusions, a 1995 album by Crematory

==== Songs ====
- "Illusion" (Aespa song), 2022
- "Illusion" (Dua Lipa song), 2024
- "Illusions" (song), by Cypress Hill, 1996
- "Illusion", by Amorphis from Circle, 2013
- "Illusion", by Ateez from Treasure EP.3: One to All, 2019
- "Illusion", by Benassi Bros from Pumphonia, 2004
- "Illusion", by Destiny's Child from Destiny's Child, 1998
- "Illusion", by GreatGuys, 2018
- "Illusion", by Heavenly from Dust to Dust, 2004
- "Illusion", by Krassimir Avramov, Bulgaria's entry in the 2009 Eurovision Song Contest
- "Illusion", by Kylie Minogue from Aphrodite, 2010
- "Illusion", by The Motions, 1968
- "Illusion", by One Direction from Four, 2014
- "Illusion", by Ross Lynch from the soundtrack album Austin & Ally, 2012
- "Illusion", by Seether, 2024
- "Illusion", by Soen from Imperial, 2021
- "Illusion", by Trail of Tears from Disclosure in Red, 1998
- "Illusion", by Versailles from Imperial, 2012
- "Illusion", by VNV Nation from Judgement, 2007
- "Illusion", by Zedd from by True Colors, 2015
- "Illusions", by As I Lay Dying from the 2005 album Shadows Are Security
- "Illusions", by Brymo from Theta, 2022
- "Illusions", by The Haunted from the 2017 album Strength in Numbers
- "Illusions", by The Human Instinct, 1966
- "Illusions", by Kid Cudi from Passion, Pain & Demon Slayin', 2016
- "Illusions", by Lone Star, 1976
- "Illusions", by Sundara Karma from the Ulfilas' Alphabet, 2019
- "Illusions", a song by Theatre of Tragedy from the 2009 album Forever Is the World

=== Other uses in arts and entertainment ===
- The Illusion (play), a 2003 play by Tony Kushner
- Illusion (musical), a 1986 Australian stage musical
- "Illusions" (Mare of Easttown), a 2021 television episode
- "Illusion", an episode of the Mission: Impossible 1966 TV series
- Illusion (comics), a fictional character in Marvel comics

== Other uses ==
- Aesthetic illusion, a type of mental absorption
- Illusion (company), a Japanese 3D graphics company
- Illusion (keelboat), a type of boat
- Illusion (turn), a rotation of the body in dance and gymnastics
- Illusion, a subgenre of magic, a performing art
- Maya (religion) (literally 'illusion' or 'magic'), with multiple meanings in Indian philosophies
- Vekoma Illusion, a type of roller coaster

== See also ==
- Grand Illusion (disambiguation)
- Ilusión (disambiguation)
- Illusionism (disambiguation)
