= List of Austin & Ally episodes =

Episodes of American comedy television series

Austin & Ally is an American comedy television series created by Kevin Kopelow and Heath Seifert that aired on Disney Channel from December 2, 2011 to January 10, 2016. The series stars Ross Lynch, Laura Marano, Raini Rodriguez, and Calum Worthy.

Set in Miami, Florida, the series focuses on the relationship between two very different musicians: extroverted and fun-loving singer and instrumentalist Austin Moon and introverted and awkward songwriter Ally Dawson, who is also a singer, but has a bad case of stage fright.

== Series overview ==
Season	Episodes	Originally released	
Season	Episodes	First released	Last released
1	19	December 2, 2011	September 9, 2012
2	26	October 7, 2012	September 29, 2013
3	22	October 27, 2013	November 23, 2014
4	20	January 18, 2015	January 10, 2016

== Episodes ==
=== Season 1 (2011–12) ===
No. overall	No. in season	Title	Directed by	Written by	Original release date	Prod. code	U.S. viewers (millions)
1	1	"Rockers & Writers"	Shelley Jensen	Kevin Kopelow & Heath Seifert	December 2, 2011	101	5.66
Ally Dawson, a shy songwriter, works at Sonic Boom, a music store owned by her father, Lester, located at the Mall of Miami. Austin Moon, an aspiring singer, interrupts Ally while she is in her practice room, singing a rough cut of "Double Take". Unbeknownst to Ally, Austin and his best friend, Dez, accidentally use the song thinking Austin wrote it himself, create a video, and post it on the Internet, after which Austin becomes an Internet sensation. After performing the song on "The Helen Show", Helen suggests that Austin return and perform another original song. Austin isn't good at songwriting, and the only solution he can think of is to plead with Ally to write another song for him. Ally initially denies in anger, but later agrees to help him. The two bond while working on their next song, "Break Down the Walls", and Austin asks Ally to be there when he performs it. However, when the pianist gets sick, Ally has to fill in. This was all part of Austin's plan to help Ally overcome her stage fright, but it only ends in disaster. However, Austin and Ally become partners, along with Dez as video director, and Ally's best friend, Trish, as Austin's manager. Guest stars: Andy Milder as Lester, Mim Drew as Helen
2	2	"Kangaroos & Chaos"	Shelley Jensen	Kevin Kopelow & Heath Seifert	December 4, 2011	102	3.96
It has been one month since Austin's latest song was released; he becomes worried that his career will end and people will forget who he is. Because of this, people are starting to think that Austin is the dog food guy since he looks a lot like Ralphie Hayes, the dog food guy in the Yummy Time Dog Food commercial. Under pressure, Ally scribbles down song lyrics to Austin's new song in illegible handwriting, prompting Trish and Dez to start gathering random props for the music video, such as a kangaroo, which they think correspond to her lyrics. The group quickly works together to resolve the mix-up and Austin performs a new song written by Ally, which successfully regains his fame. Guest stars: Andy Milder as Lester, Andy Goldenberg as Martin, Hollywood Yates as Facepuncher, Emily Skinner as Mad Dog
3	3	"Secrets & Songbooks"	Shelley Jensen	Eric Friedman	December 11, 2011	103	3.40
Ally loses her songbook, which is also her diary, so she and Trish desperately look for it, unaware that Austin and Dez have already found and read it, discovering that Ally has a secret crush. When Austin is convinced it is him, he tries to find a way to make Ally stop crushing on him and let her know they are just friends. Ally and Trish find out Austin and Dez have read the diary and plan an elaborate scheme for revenge to teach Austin a lesson. Ally reveals that her crush is actually a boy named Dallas (Noah Centineo) who works at the cell phone accessory cart near Sonic Boom. Guest stars: Cole Sand as Nelson, Carlos Santos as Interviewer
4	4	"Zaliens & Cloud Watchers"	Shelley Jensen	Rick Nyholm	January 8, 2012	105	2.99
Ally writes a new song that she is proud of, as it is supposed to be about Austin; however, he hates the song because it is not him at all. The two decide they need to get to know each other better in order for Ally to write songs that will relate to Austin, so they each do activities that the other finds fun. Meanwhile, Trish and Dez, who have never gotten along, surprisingly discover they have things in common. After the horror festival ends in a fiasco, involving Pickles the Goose who helps Ally with her writer's block, Austin and Ally finally decide that although they are different, it's that difference that makes them better partners. Guest stars: Cole Sand as Nelson, Matthew Scott Montgomery as Walter
5	5	"Bloggers & Butterflies"	Shelley Jensen	Heath Seifert & Kevin Kopelow	January 15, 2012	104	2.81
Austin finds himself at the receiving end of Hater Girl, a blogger who specializes in trashing people she hates. After some doing, the team tracks Hater Girl down, a teen their age named Tilly. However it's revealed she doesn't hate Austin, she hates Ally. As it turns out, Tilly was still bitter over losing a songwriting contest to Ally back in kindergarten. Tilly agrees to take her reviews down on the condition Austin sings one of her terrible songs. Guest stars: Audrey Whitby as Tilly, Cole Sand as Nelson
6	6	"Tickets & Trashbags"	Adam Weissman	Samantha Silver & Joey Manderino	January 22, 2012	107	2.98
Everyone is excited when Austin is invited to perform at the Miami Internet Music Awards; unfortunately, Austin is only allowed to bring one guest. Everyone's friendship is tested as Ally, Trish, and Dez all compete to win the coveted guest ticket. After Austin accidentally says yes to all of them, they all get upset with him, leaving Austin wondering if he should just go alone. On the night of the awards, Ally, Trish, and Dez realize they have been selfish and show up in disguise to support Austin during his performance. Guest stars: Cole Sand as Nelson, James Earl as Shiny Money
7	7	"Managers & Meatballs"	Adam Weissman	Wayne Conley	January 29, 2012	108	3.55
Everyone's loyalty is put to the test when Austin is approached by hotshot music manager Demonica Dixon who wants to sign him, promising to take his music career to the next level. Austin is backed into the position of having to choose between his friends and the promise of fame. When Austin learns that Demonica has been purposely sabotaging his friendships with Ally, Trish, and Dez, he sticks with his friends, saying that he doesn't want to be famous without them. In the end, the group gives Demonica a taste of her own medicine. Guest star: Lisa Arch as Demonica Dixon
8	8	"Club Owners & Quinceañeras"	Eric Dean Seaton	Joey Manderino & Samantha Silver	February 19, 2012	109	3.53
Trish is having her quinceañera and mentions that Emilio, a relative and big-time club owner, will be at her party. Austin decides to perform at Trish's party so he can impress Emilio to book him in his clubs. Trish invites Dallas to her party so that Ally can dance with him. However, since Ally is a horrible dancer she asks Austin to give her dance lessons, but accidentally breaks his leg during a practice. At the party, Ally asks Dallas to dance with her, but he says no to her. Ally becomes upset and doesn't enjoy the rest of the party. During the middle of the party, Dez thinks Austin can swing in on a rope for his grand entrance for his performance. However, they end up wrecking all of Trish's presents. Ally also finds out Dallas said no to her just because he was also a horrible dancer. At the very end of the party, Ally and Dallas find out they have much in common and connect with each other by dancing. When Emilio shows up, the group finds out Emilio doesn't own night clubs, but he owns country clubs. Guest stars: Eileen Galindo as Trish's Mom, Devan Leos as J.J.
9	9	"Deejays & Demos"	Roger Christiansen	Steve Freeman & Aaron Ho	February 26, 2012	111	2.73
Prior to an impending radio interview, Austin overhears Ally playing a personal ballad in her spare time and is thoroughly impressed. He decides to sneak a copy of the song for the interview which brings the same reaction from the DJ and the audience, who insists on inviting Ally on a future show with Austin despite her stage fright. The team now has days to either try to help her overcome her phobia before the interview or find another way to cover for her. Guest star: Preston Jones as Miami Mack
10	10	"World Records & World Wreckers" "World Records & Work Wreckers"	Phill Lewis	Kevin Kopelow & Heath Seifert	March 4, 2012	113	3.06
Guest stars: Andy Milder as Lester, Noah Centineo as Dallas
11	11	"Songwriting & Starfish"	Eric Dean Seaton	Eric Friedman	March 11, 2012	110	2.63
Austin is interested in participating in the Hot Summer Jam Contest, with a little help from his friends. The contest takes place at the beach where Ally wants to get over her bad memories so she and Austin can work out some lyrics. When Ally's book gets covered in gum, Trish puts the book into her cart to freeze the gum so they can scrape it off. They forget about the book and have to try and break into the shop to get it back. While in the shop they get locked in the freezer, so Austin calls Dez to save them. Dez finally rescues them, but they get caught by Officer Dunphy. While in the police station, they explain the story, and Officer Dunphy accuses them of stealing Fruity Mint Swirl ice-cream in the shop's freezer, forcing them to miss the contest. While Officer Dunphy is filling out police reports, he shows that he is an amazing drummer. Austin invites him to be in his band at the contest, and convinces him to let them go. Guest star: Kelly Perine as Officer Dunphy
12	12	"Soups & Stars"	Shannon Flynn	Wayne Conley	March 25, 2012	115	2.58
Ally joins the social media "Tweeter" (parody of Twitter), but she has less followers than the others due to her more serious and introspective "twits". In addition, Trish starts working at a new soup restaurant that was owned by Ally and Trish's old music teacher, Miss Suzy. Although Miss Suzy was Ally's favorite teacher, Ally was always bothered with the fact that Miss Suzy would give others gold stars, but not her. At the restaurant, the gang starts twitting, and Ally decides to twit a picture of a rubber spider in her bowl of soup, captioning it "spider-noodle soup". Although she gains popularity and gets almost 5,000 followers, people stop eating at Miss Suzy's, believing the soups were contaminated, and it gets worse when people starts to make parody pictures of it online. So, the gang decide to help Miss Suzy get her business back by making a commercial for the restaurant. Ally goes overboard trying to get a gold star and becomes a perfectionist, while the others are just trying to have fun. Dez eventually saves the day with editing Ally's commercial with other clips, successfully bringing people back to Miss Suzy's. In the end, Miss Suzy explained that she only gave gold stars to ones who needed motivation; Ally never needed one. However, but to make her feel better, Miss Suzy gives her one anyway. Guest star: Lynne Marie Stewart as Miss Suzy
13	13	"Burglaries & Boobytraps"	Shelley Jensen	Aaron Ho & Steve Freeman	April 15, 2012	106	3.28
When the stores in the mall start getting robbed, Ally and a team of other mall employees set out to find out who the burglar is. A security camera shows Austin taking a guitar from a display case at Sonic Boom. Austin later explains that he was trying to get the guitar autographed by Bruno Mars, much to Ally and Trish's surprise. With most of the mall thinking that Austin is the culprit, the group must scramble to figure out who's really responsible. Meanwhile, a delivery worker delivers items to all stores including Sonic Boom, but his request for a tip goes unnoticed. The burglar turns out to be the delivery man after Austin hides in the piano that the burglar takes. Guest stars: Andy Milder as Lester, Greg Worswick as Billl
14	14	"myTAB & My Pet"	Phill Lewis	Rick Nyholm	April 22, 2012	114	2.87
Guest stars: Ashley Fink as Mindy, Greg Worswick as Billl
15	15	"Filmmaking & Fear Breaking"	Roger Christiansen	Rick Nyholm	May 20, 2012	112	3.05
Guest star: Cole Sand as Nelson
16	16	"Diners & Daters"	Shelley Jensen	Aaron Ho & Steve Freeman	June 17, 2012	116	2.87
Trish gets a new job at Melody Diner with a singing waitress named Cassidy with whom Austin falls in love. When he asks her out, she turns him down because she cannot balance the stress of work, a band, and a boyfriend. He gets a job at the diner to be around her, and when he again asks her out after serenading her, she declines due to the fact her band is moving to L.A. for a record deal. Meanwhile, Dez finds out that Mindy is the manager of the diner and must get away from her because he knows she is infatuated with him. Guest stars: Ashley Fink as Mindy, Aubrey Peeples as Cassidy
17	17	"Everglades & Allygators"	Shelley Jensen	Clay Lapari	July 15, 2012	119	3.52
Shiny Money invites Austin and the group to his annual Swamp Blast party in the Everglades. When they get there, the power in the houseboat goes out. Meanwhile, Trish and Dez go out to hunt for a legendary alligator, "Big Mama". Little do they know, a baby alligator followed them to the boat, attracting Big Mama. Big Mama bursts through the boat door, but the group works together and makes her leave. Dez accidentally drills a hole in the floor of the boat, causing it to sink. In the end, Austin delivers an unforgettable performance at the Swamp Blast. Guest stars: James Earl as Shiny Money, John Lee Ames as Clavis
18	18	"Successes & Setbacks"	Shelley Jensen	Samantha Silver & Joey Manderino	August 19, 2012	117	3.29
Guest stars: John Henson as Mike Moon, Jill Benjamin as Mimi Moon, Richard Whiten as Jimmy Starr, Robert Picardo as Dr. Grant
19	19	"Albums & Auditions"	Eric Dean Seaton	Heath Seifert & Kevin Kopelow	September 9, 2012	118	2.95
Austin's music career is flourishing—his album is about to be released and Ally got accepted into Music University of New York with the help of Austin, Trish, and Dez. However, the group is unaware that the music school is in New York. Heartbroken, Ally finally reveals the big news. The group is devastated about her departure and they do not want her to leave. Now Ally has to decide whether to give up her dream and stay in Miami and continue being Austin's partner or leave for New York. During the album release party, the group makes a slideshow of all the good times they shared together. Afterward, they say their final goodbyes; however, Ally later announces that she is already living her dream and that she is staying in Miami. Guest stars: Andy Milder as Lester, Cole Sand as Nelson, Richard Whiten as Jimmy Starr, John O'Brien as Mr. Neidermeyer

=== Season 2 (2012–13) ===
No. overall	No. in season	Title	Directed by	Written by	Original release date	Prod. code	U.S. viewers (millions)
20	1	"Costumes & Courage"	Shelley Jensen	Rick Nyholm	October 7, 2012	201	4.02
Austin's new record label owner, Jimmy Starr, invites him to perform at the Starr Records Halloween party, where he will sing a duet with Taylor Swift to Ally's newest song; however, Austin thinks that Ally sold their song to Taylor Swift and accidentally sends Jimmy a text where he lets out his frustration. At the Halloween party, they split up to find Jimmy in order to delete the text message. Meanwhile, Trish and Dez decide to go on a ghost-hunting mission since the mansion they are in is supposedly haunted. Luckily, they find Jimmy and Ally deletes the message by pretending to send a text to her father. Trish and Dez's ghost-hunting mission goes awry when they accidentally knock Taylor Swift unconscious. Since Ally is wearing the exact same costume as Taylor Swift, she steps in and acts as Taylor Swift to not leave Austin hanging. Guest stars: Richard Whiten as Jimmy Starr, Cole Sand as Nelson
21	2	"Backups & Breakups"	Shelley Jensen	Heath Seifert & Kevin Kopelow	October 14, 2012	202	3.69
Austin and Ally are suspicious when Trish and Dez are hiding something from them. This leads them to believe that they are dating when, in fact, Trish is dating Trent, who becomes Austin's newest backup dancer. Trish decided to keep their relationship a secret to not influence Austin's decision when Trent auditioned for a role as Austin's backup dancer. Later, Ally finds out that Trent is cheating on Trish and only dated her to be a backup dancer in Austin's group, she decides whether to tell her or not. After getting advice from her mother, Penny, over video-chat, she decides to tell her. Trish confronts Trent and they break up and Austin fires him from the group, but Trent thinks that the reason he was fired is because Austin is jealous that he is the "better" dancer. Trent challenges Austin to a dance-off. In the end, Austin wins the dance-off and Trish gets a new boyfriend. Guest stars: Julia Campbell as Penny Dawson, Trevor Jackson as Trent
22	3	"Magazines & Made-Up Stuff"	Shelley Jensen	Joey Manderino & Samantha Silver	October 28, 2012	205	3.54
Trish books Austin for the cover of a popular teen magazine, Cheetah Beat. First, Austin must answer a questionnaire, but Trish thinks he is boring so she decides to fill it out for him instead. When the journalist, Megan Simms, shows up, everyone realizes Trish has embellished Austin's hobbies, skills, and interests. Megan wants to see all of Austin's astonishing skills to prove he is worthy to be on the cover. Austin fears that if he backs down, Megan will expose him as a total liar. Now the group must find a way to keep the journalist impressed while not getting Austin into trouble. Guest stars: Aubrey Miller as Megan Simms, Carrie Wampler as Brooke
23	4	"Parents & Punishments"	Shelley Jensen	Steve Freeman & Aaron Ho	November 4, 2012	206	3.33
After a flood at Nelson's school ruins all of their instruments, he is sad because the music program will not be able to perform their concert. Ally accidentally gives away all of the instruments at Sonic Boom to the music program. Somehow Ally must come up with $10,000 to buy all of the instruments back before her father finds out. The group decides to host a fundraiser to raise the money and Austin is set to give a phenomenal performance in order to receive more donations. However, when Austin gets grounded due to his bad grades, the group is left needing a backup plan. Guest stars: John Henson as Mike Moon, Andy Milder as Lester Dawson, Jill Benjamin as Mimi Moon, Cole Sand as Nelson, Aubrey Miller as Megan Simms
24	5	"Crybabies & Cologne"	Shelley Jensen	Luisa Leschin	November 11, 2012	204	3.31
Trent returns to apologize to Trish for deceiving her, but she rejects his apology and Austin tells him to leave. Later, Austin and Ally were recording the song "Got It 2", when Trent appears again. He asks Ally to write a song for him so he can become an overnight Internet sensation like Austin, but Ally refuses out of loyalty to Trish, while Austin tells him to leave again. As Austin and Ally are distracted, Trent steals the "Got It 2" CD and leaves. Later, Trent fools Dez into giving him the filming technique he used in the Double Take video. At school, they learn that an artist named "T-Fame" had uploaded "Got It 2" online. After seeing the video, they learn "T-Fame" was Trent, and Austin accuses Trent of stealing, causing a rivalry between the two of them. Trent continues copying Austin, even going as far as introducing his friend Dex, a Dez lookalike. Trent is even invited on the Wanda Watson Show, the same show Austin was going to be on. Austin attempts to call out Trent as a fake, but this leads him to be dubbed the "Crybaby of the Week". Team Austin attempt to get back at Trent by leaving a fake suit, but they saw Trent wasn't wearing. During the interview, Dez and Dex are enamored by another guest on the talk show, the Bee Whisperer, and inadvertently release the bees he had. Austin and Wanda get out fine, but the bees swarm Trent due to his honey-scented cologne. He panics and destroys the show's set in a manner similar to when Ally destroyed the Helen Show set back in the first episode. Trent accuses Austin of causing the bee attack, leading the former to be dubbed the "Crybaby of the Week". Guest stars: Trevor Jackson as Trent, Alexander Walsh as Dex
25	6	"Austin & Jessie & Ally All Star New Year" "Big Dreams & Big Apples"	Bob Koherr	Wayne Conley & Mike Montesano & Ted Zizik	December 7, 2012	211	4.81
Austin, Ally, Trish, and Dez travel to New York City where Austin is booked to perform at Times Square on New Year's Eve. Although Trish really booked him at Tim's Square Pizza, so she now has to fix the whole situation. Trish takes Jimmy Starr's computer while he is being distracted by Dez and talks to a musical agent of the company to see if he can fix the whole mess. Later, the mess is fixed, except trouble ensues when the plane suffers mechanical problems and is diverted to Philadelphia. The group quickly comes up with a solution and decides to take a cab to New York, but they're kicked off when they can't afford the fare for going a far distance. When security won't let the group through the crowded streets, they bump into Jessie, a nanny, and Emma, a crazed fan. Luckily, Jessie comes up with an effective plan to get Austin to perform on time. Jessie takes a helicopter to Times Square so Austin will be there on time. Meanwhile, Jessie lets the group stay at their apartment in hopes that Austin will record one of her songs and turn it into a big hit. There the group meets the rest of the Ross family: Luke, Ravi, Zuri, and Bertram. Later, they all travel to Miami, where Austin and Jessie sing a duet at his next concert. It's revealed Jessie's "song" is actually Zuri's school assignment. Zuri finds out and ends up giving Jessie credit because she knows how much it means to her. In the end, Austin and Jessie give an unforgettable performance and Dez makes an awesome music video. Guest star: Richard Whiten as Jimmy Starr
26	7	"Ferris Wheels & Funky Breath"	Shelley Jensen	Aaron Ho & Steve Freeman	January 13, 2013	203	3.27
Dez is filming Austin's new music video with Starr Records and he hires a girl named Kira as Austin's love interest. Kira has the looks, but unfortunately she has halitosis, making her really hard to work with. When Dez is determined to fire her, they discover that she is Jimmy Starr's daughter. They try numerous times to freshen up her breath, but fail, so they attempt to make her quit when Dez attaches a drool tube to Austin. It works, but Jimmy has Kira rehired for the video and has Austin speak to the Miami children's club. Jimmy ends up finding out about Kira's bad breath and offers to do something about it. Guest stars: Andy Milder as Lester Dawson, Richard Whiten as Jimmy Starr, Kiersey Clemons as Kira
27	8	"Girlfriends & Girl Friends"	Shelley Jensen	Samantha Silver & Joey Manderino	January 27, 2013	207	3.96
Now that Kira has cured her bad breath, Austin decides to ask her out. She accepts, but changes her mind when she believes Austin has a crush on Ally. In order to prove her wrong, Ally helps Austin plan the perfect date for him and Kira, but in the process realizes that she likes Austin. After Austin leaves for his date, Dez looks through Kira's MyFace page and Ally realizes that everything she has packed for Austin and Kira's date Kira dislikes. On top of that, Ally realizes that the necklace she is wearing reads "Kira". Austin was supposed to give it to Kira, but instead took Ally's identical necklace that said "Ally". Ally, Trish, and Dez decide to sneak to the park and switch Austin's picnic basket so that Kira will not think that Ally is trying to sabotage their night. They are caught and Kira blames Ally for ruining the date. In the end, Austin and Kira decide to stay together and finish their date playing video games in Dez's basement, leaving Ally upset. Guest star: Kiersey Clemons as Kira Starr
28	9	"Campers & Complications"	Adam Weissman	Rick Nyholm	February 17, 2013	208	4.91
When Ally's old summer camp friend, Elliot, comes to Miami to visit, he and Ally spend a lot of time catching up and reminiscing about the past. Although Austin is now dating Kira, he suddenly finds himself jealous seeing Ally with Elliot. Later, Austin reveals to Dez that he also has feelings for Ally, making him confused about whom he really loves. When Austin hears that Ally is planning to tell Elliot she wants to be his girlfriend, he runs to the restaurant to stop her. However, it turns out to be a misunderstanding—Ally had actually been planning to tell Elliot that she couldn't be with him because they had nothing to talk about other than summer camp. Meanwhile, Dez is feeling alone without Austin, so he hangs out with Trish who takes advantage of him to do her work for her while she enjoys some leisure time. Guest stars: Kiersey Clemons as Kira Starr, Cody Christian as Elliot
29	10	"Chapters & Choices"	Adam Weissman	Kevin Kopelow & Heath Seifert	February 24, 2013	209	4.03
Penny, Ally's mother, returns from Africa to host a book release party and Ally finally works up the courage to face her biggest fear and perform on stage. Meanwhile, Austin decides whom he really loves and asks Kira to be his girlfriend, but she tells him she needs time to think. At the event, Austin and Ally perform a duet together and Ally successfully conquers her stage fright. After their performance, Austin and Ally run backstage in joy and share a spontaneous kiss. Shortly after, Kira arrives and accepts Austin's offer to be his girlfriend, in front of Ally, leaving Ally heartbroken and Austin guilty, which ends on a cliffhanger. Meanwhile, Lester is not happy about Penny naming a cheap gorilla after him. Guest stars: Julia Campbell as Penny Dawson, Andy Milder as Lester Dawson, Kiersey Clemons as Kira Starr
30	11	"Partners & Parachutes"	Eric Dean Seaton	Heath Seifert & Kevin Kopelow	March 17, 2013	210	4.38
After what happened with Kira, Ally tries to move on and focuses on her career. Meanwhile, Austin tries to break up with Kira to be with Ally, but his methods backfire. Trish becomes Ally's manager and books her an interview with Megan Simms to talk about her career, but Megan cares more about the gossip. Austin finally breaks up with Kira, but when they hug, Megan snaps the picture, and it makes the cover of Cheetah Beat. Ally still believes Austin is with Kira, so Austin tries to win her over by buying her a new piano and Dez suggests an idea to parachute it. At Ally's congratulations party, things go wrong when the piano crashes down from the sky. Later, Austin finds a song that Ally wrote, which explains that she still has feelings for him. In the end, Austin serenades Ally with that song and they officially become a couple. Guest stars: Julia Campbell as Penny Dawson, Andy Milder as Lester Dawson, Richard Whiten as Jimmy Starr, Kiersey Clemons as Kira Starr, Aubrey Miller as Megan Simms
31	12	"Freaky Friends & Fan Fiction"	Eric Dean Seaton	Rick Nyholm	April 7, 2013	217	3.56
Dez enters a short story contest; to help him win, he purchases an antique typewriter that just happens to be magic. Everything starts to go well, but, unfortunately, Dez's worst enemy, Chuck, steals it, causing Austin, Ally, Trish, and Dez to do everything that Chuck types on the magic typewriter. Now they have to do everything they can to get it back. Chuck makes the group's hair purple, makes the group switch bodies, and makes Ally and Trish fall in love with him. At the end, it turns out the whole episode is Dez's actual short story. Guest stars: Andy Milder as Lester Dawson, John Paul Green as Chuck
32	13	"Couples & Careers"	Eric Dean Seaton	Teresa Ingram	May 5, 2013	212	3.67
Austin goes on his first date with Ally, but their date gets ruined when bad luck continues to strike. Later, Ally gets the chance to perform a song in a movie, but Austin and Ally can't agree on how to genre the song. Everything turns bad when the producer of the movie wants the song, but because of their disagreements, the song doesn't sound good. This event makes Austin and Ally realize they should not be a couple because they could hurt each other's feelings and ruin their friendship, so they decide to just stay friends. Meanwhile, Trish and Dez make a film so they can win a contest. Guest star: Matt Cook as Al the Magnificent
33	14	"Spas & Spices"	Adam Weissman	Luisa Leschin	May 19, 2013	213	2.56
Trish invites Ally to get some spa treatments to prepare for a photo shoot. The day of relaxation turns into a disaster when Ally drinks a wheatgrass juice that makes her teeth green, her hair is treated until it turns puffy, her facial turns her face pink, and her hands get stuck in wax in the nail bath. Meanwhile, Dez prepares for a chili cook-off against Chuck. Austin gets Ally's necklace from her grandmother, but accidentally drops it in the chili pot right before the judging. Luckily, they find it. Guest stars: Cole Sand as Nelson, John Paul Green as Chuck
34	15	"Solos & Stray Kitties"	Shelley Jensen	Joey Manderino & Samantha Silver	June 2, 2013	214	3.19
Ally auditions for a record deal and is accepted, but is shocked to find out it's for a superficial music group called "The Stray Kitties". Disliking the group, Ally tries to quit, but her manager, Val, won't let her. Austin, Trish, and Dez try to find a way to get Ally out of her contract. Meanwhile, Dez gets advice from Austin about a girl he likes. Dez begins to act sophisticated for his crush because she is "Glamour Kitty". However, she later reveals that's just an act for "The Stray Kitties". She reveals she likes some of the things Dez had liked, like Zalien movies and wacky shirts. Believing Dez is really sophisticated, she rejects him. He then chases after her in an attempt to tell her the truth. Guest stars: Saidah Arrika Ekulona as Val, Kimberly Whalen as Glamour Kitty, Skyler Vallo as Country Kitty
35	16	"Boy Songs & Badges"	Eric Dean Seaton	Kevin Kopelow & Heath Seifert	June 8, 2013	218	2.45
Ally has to write three songs for herself for a meeting with a record label, but Austin also needs a song for when he goes on Video Countdown Lives' New Music Tuesday. He tells Ally he can write his own song, but after trying to find inspiration from the Pioneer Rangers handbook, he finds that the song he and Dez wrote is actually horrible. Austin is too embarrassed to ask for Ally's help, so he instead takes Dez's advice and tries to get Ally to offer help. Their plan backfires when Ally is afraid she'll hurt their feelings and says she loves it. Trish tells Ally that Austin will be humiliated if he gets on live TV, so Ally tells him her honest opinion and Austin asks for help. Ally tells him that there isn't enough time, but suggests he uses one of her demo songs; however, he refuses because her songs are too girly for him. Meanwhile, Trish is helping her brother's Pioneer Rangers group and has to take them camping. Ally suggests that Austin calls the show to say that he has to reschedule because he is volunteering with the Pioneer Rangers. However, the plan backfires when the show suggests bringing the show to Austin and watching him perform from the campground. On the day they're leaving, Ally suggests that Austin could sing his song as a gift for the children since it is centered on the Pioneer Rangers. When he sings his song, the show thinks it's a joke and Austin has to find a new song to sing. The Pioneer Rangers are told to stall the broadcast by tying the host to a stump with an impossible knot and then trapping the rest of the crew in a tent so that Austin doesn't have to go live. In the end, Austin doesn't have to perform live after a bear shows up at the campsite. Guest stars: Cole Sand as Nelson, Devan Leos as J.J.
36	17	"Tracks & Troubles"	Sean Lambert	Steve Freeman & Aaron Ho	June 23, 2013	216	3.29
Jimmy Starr offers to buy Ally's new song for his daughter, Kira, but Ally says no because the song is about her. Kira has a new album that she has gone to record. The group later goes to check it out, but when Austin, Trish, and Dez accidentally ruin the song in the recording studio, Austin gets released from his contract with Starr Records. Kira has a gig and before she performs her song Ally goes to Kira and gives her the song and asks Kira to tell her father to sign Austin back to his record deal. Kira lets Ally sing her song "Finally Me" at the gig. When Ally finishes her song, Jimmy goes up to her and tells her that what she was willing to do for Austin was sweet. He then signs Austin back to his record deal and also signs Ally on a record deal. Guest stars: Richard Whiten as Jimmy Starr, Kiersey Clemons as Kira Starr
37	18	"Viral Videos & Very Bad Dancing"	Shannon Flynn	Luisa Leschin	July 14, 2013	219	3.23
Ally is nominated by Jean Paul Paul-Jean as a nominee of "Miami's Future Five". Each nominee must post a video of themselves online, but after Jean Paul Paul-Jean says that Ally may not win due to her lack of dancing ability, her friends try to change her original decision to create a dance video. Ally instead stays with her idea of a dance video. Ally ends up winning the contest and lets her friends know that she believed in herself. Meanwhile, Austin and Dez try to relax at a fake beach. Guest star: Arturo Del Puerto as Jean Paul Paul-Jean
38	19	"Tunes & Trials"	Shelley Jensen	Samantha Silver & Joey Manderino	July 19, 2013	220	4.10
Ally thinks Austin should have another shot at songwriting, so she gives him a songwriting book. To help him, she tells him to write about something or someone he cares about. Austin writes a song called "Steal Your Heart" and it becomes a big hit. Meanwhile, Trish and Dez are addicted to a show called Crime and Judgement. Soon afterward, everyone begins asking Austin who he wrote the song about. Trish and Dez try to search for answers, using their knowledge from watching the show. Later, Val accuses Austin of stealing "Steal Your Heart", which she claimed she wrote, but the group suspects she is only suing them to get revenge for not writing her a song for the Stray Kitties. The next day, they go to court, where the group tries their best to defend Austin, but experiences trouble when Val displays her own evidence, putting them at risk of losing the case. Trish decides to question each of Austin's previous romantic interests to try to prove he wrote the song about one of them, but, unfortunately, they have no luck. They come to a decision to have Austin perform "Steal your heart" as evidence. Trish watches throughout the performance and notices that Austin looked at every girl in the courtroom except Ally. After that, Austin admits that the song is about Ally, after which they both admit they still have feelings for each other, but they still decide to be friends. In the end, the group wins the case. Guest stars: Kiersey Clemons as Kira Starr, Saidah Arrika Ekulona as Val, Gregg Daniel as Judge Fleming, Carrie Wampler as Brooke
39	20	"Future Sounds & Festival Songs"	Shelley Jensen	Francisco Angones & Amy Higgins	July 28, 2013	226	3.32
Austin is invited to perform at the "World Music Festival" and Jimmy Starr asks Austin and Ally to write a new song for the festival. Austin chooses to use a futuristic instrument to write the song, but Ally believes they should write it the old-fashioned way. After Austin accidentally breaks it, he gets electrocuted and is transferred to the year 2345, where everything is plain white and music is just random noise. Austin discovers that the advanced machines have ruined everything, making songwriting and music less personal. Austin realizes that the regular way of writing songs is more important, so he teaches real music to futuristic versions of Ally, Trish, and Dez. He then gets electrocuted again, waking up from his futuristic dream in the present day and tells his friends. Guest stars: Richard Whiten as Jimmy Starr, Cole Sand as Nelson
40	21	"Sports & Brains" "Sports & Sprains"	Shelley Jensen	Wayne Conley	August 4, 2013	221	2.88
It is spirit week at Marino High: Austin joins the basketball team, Ally writes for the school paper, Dez becomes a cheerleader, and Trish pretends to care about school in order to win $1,000. After Austin joins the basketball team, Jimmy Starr tells him to quit so he doesn't get injured, affecting his ability to dance. Ally helps Austin decide to stay on the team, but, unfortunately, he sprains his knee during a match. The group then must figure out a way to help Austin perform at an upcoming concert. Meanwhile, Dez competes against Chuck for the position of the school's yell leader. Guest stars: Richard Whiten as Jimmy Starr, John Paul Green as Chuck, Cassidy Ann Shaffer as Kimmy
41	22	"Beach Bums & Bling"	Sean Lambert	Wayne Conley	August 11, 2013	215	3.08
Austin discovers his old rock 'n' roll hero, Jackson Lowe, playing for money at the mall. Austin convinces his friends to help him get a big comeback. Trish plans a concert for Austin and Jackson to perform a new song Ally wrote. Before the concert, Jackson refuses to perform, but changes his mind after advice from Austin. The concert goes well until Jackson has a meltdown after Dez starts taking pictures with flash. He then decides it's best to stay out of the music business and reveals that he isn't broke. Meanwhile, Austin gives gifts to his friends from his career check, Ally wears a pair of crystal shoes that are hard to walk in, Trish looks for a job where she can be her own boss, and Dez finds a solid gold cart. Guest stars: Paul Zies as Jackson Lowe, Amanda Leighton as Bonnie
42	23	"Family & Feuds"	Craig Wyrick-Solari	Rick Nyholm	September 1, 2013	223	2.44
Dez is temporarily staying in Sonic Boom due to one of his dad's inventions, a robot dog, going haywire. Dez attempts to win a scooter for his sister Didi's birthday in a radio contest, but loses to Chuck. At the party, Didi expresses excitement over her new boyfriend, whom everybody learns is Chuck. It turns out that Chuck's family and Dez's family have been in a feud for a long time, dating back to the Middle Ages. Despite Dez's parents putting their differences aside and approving the relationship, Dez wants no part in the agreement, and Austin supports his friend. Using Trish's job at Miami FM 109, they trick Didi into thinking Chuck dedicated a love song to another girl, causing her to break up with him. Chuck retaliates at Team Austin with lots of strawberry jam. Fed up, Dez decides to hide in the practice room with tuna cans and water until Chuck goes to college. Seeing how depressed Didi was since the breakup, Dez's parents, as well as Austin, Trish, and Ally, decide that the feud needs to end. Ally purposely lures Chuck with a fake pie-baking contest at Sonic Boom. Trish then makes a fake broadcast that the zombie apocalypse has started, and both Dez and Chuck believe it. The fake alert ultimately makes them put their differences aside, and the two become friends while Chuck and Didi rekindle, with Dez's approval. Guest stars: John Paul Green as Chuck, Vicki Lewis as Donna, Jamie Kaler as Dennis, Galadriel Stineman as Didi
43	24	"Moon Week & Mentors"	Ken Ceizler	Aaron Ho & Steve Freeman	September 15, 2013	222	3.56
Austin and Ally are going to be guest judges on America's Top Talent, and they help a girl, Lucy, who is very similar to Ally, with stage fright so she can be a star. Ally thinks that she knows everything that Lucy likes and has to do to overcome her fear because she has almost the same mannerisms that Ally used to have, such as chewing on her hair when she gets nervous. Ally tries to make Lucy become a different person by not letting her choose the song that she wants to sing and changing her wardrobe. Ally tries to choose everything for Lucy, but later Ally realizes that she taught Lucy to change in order to fit in. Lucy starts to feel uncomfortable on stage and then Ally realizes that she taught Lucy wrong and then tells her that she really does just have to be herself. Meanwhile, Trish wants to be on TV, so Dez makes signs; however, he did not make the first sign big enough and accidentally let go of the second balloon sign. Guest stars: Saidah Arrika Ekulona as Val, Arturo Del Puerto as Jean Paul Paul-Jean, Sabrina Carpenter as Lucy
44	25	"Real Life & Reel Life"	Shelley Jensen	Joey Manderino & Samantha Silver	September 22, 2013	224	3.23
Trish and Dez want to film a "documentary" about Austin and Ally, but when the filming process brings out secrets about the pair, their friendship is torn apart. It is revealed that Ally doubted her partnership with Austin in the beginning, which upsets Austin that Ally had no faith in him. Dez then accidentally reveals that Austin secretly met with another songwriter while Ally's career was taking off, which upsets Ally that Austin was thinking of replacing her. The secrets cause the two to fight with each other, preventing the film from being finished. Trish and Dez come up with an idea so the two could forgive each other. It's successful, and Austin and Ally forgive each other and share their second kiss.
45	26	"Fresh Starts & Farewells"	Shelley Jensen	Heath Seifert & Kevin Kopelow	September 29, 2013	225	3.27
Austin finally gets to go on his first national tour and invites Ally, Trish, and Dez to come on tour with him. However, when Ally gets a record deal with Ronnie Ramone, she has to decide whether to go on tour with Austin or stay in Miami and sign with Ronnie's label. During discussing whether or not she should go with Trish, she admits that she still has feelings for Austin and she feels that Austin feels the same way and thinks that if they don't see each other for three months that their feelings can change. Later, Ally shows up at the tour bus and hugs everyone goodbye. Austin quickly runs back out and is about to tell Ally he loves her, but instead gives her a card with a message inside. The last scene shows Ally playing the piano in Ronnie's studio while looking at the card that Austin gave her and Austin playing to the same song on guitar on the tour bus. Guest stars: Richard Whiten as Jimmy Starr, Joe Rowley as Ronnie Ramone, Sunkrish Bala as Roger Dunlap

=== Season 3 (2013–14) ===
No. overall	No. in season	Title	Directed by	Written by	Original release date	Prod. code	U.S. viewers (millions)
46	1	"Road Trips & Reunions"	Shelley Jensen	Kevin Kopelow & Heath Seifert	October 27, 2013	301	3.28
Ally is having trouble finishing her songs and video chats her friends. Since Ally decided not to go on tour with her friends, she reunites with them by joining them for a few days until her meeting with Ronnie Ramone. However, things go wrong when Ally takes a plane to Portland, Maine, and Austin, Trish, and Dez are in Portland, Oregon. Later that night, Austin sleepwalks to the bathroom at a Washington rest stop and gets on the wrong tour bus with a group of screaming Buttercup Girls. Ally meets up with Trish and Dez in Washington, and they soon find out that Austin is missing. When they try to see each other again, Austin ends up in Washington, DC, while Ally is in Seattle, Washington. At Austin's Seattle concert, Austin finally arrives to see Ally and hugs her. Ally then decides to stay with Austin on tour because he is her inspiration and she writes better songs with him. Guest stars: Andy Milder as Lester Dawson, Molly Jackson as Lulu
47	2	"What Ifs & Where's Austin?"	Shelley Jensen	Rick Nyholm	November 3, 2013	302	3.48
When Austin leaves to get food, Ally, Trish, and Dez imagine life without Austin. In this imagination, Ally becomes Trish's songwriter instead of Austin's and Dez is a loner (having never met Austin) who gives up his filmmaking career to become Trish's assistant. Ally quits because Trish changes up Ally's lyrics to conceited ones, which causes Ally to give up on music and become a scientist instead. Trish gets booed at all of her performances because of her songs' lyrics and eventually loses her record deal, fame, and friendship with Ally after blaming the latter for her failures. She becomes very sad that she has lost everything and has nobody, but Dez tells her she is not alone and that she has him. Trish and Dez have a love scene and share a kiss. They then all admit it would be awful if Austin weren't there with them. Trish admits that kissing Dez wouldn't be the worst thing in the world, but losing Ally as her best friend would be. Guest star: Richard Whiten as Jimmy Starr
48	3	"Presidents & Problems"	Shelley Jensen	Meg DeLoatch	November 10, 2013	303	3.03
In Washington D.C., the last stop of Austin's tour, Austin receives a "Role Model of the Year" award, which makes Dez so desperate to get one as well since he hasn't received an award in his life before. Afterward, the group does some sightseeing at a Smithsonian Museum. While Ally impresses herself as an amateur tour guide, Austin tries on some movie memorabilia and inadvertently gets his feet stuck in a pair of Dorothy's silver shoes. The group is able to elude museum security. Trish receives a call confirming that Austin will perform for the president of the United States. During his performance, Austin wears huge sneakers, but one of them slips off and nearly hits the president. Austin comes clean and tells the president the truth, who is moved by his honesty and pardons him. The president then awards Dez a medal for blocking the sneaker that was about to hit him. Guest stars: Tom Fonss as Anders, Reggie Brown as President
49	4	"Beach Clubs & BFFs"	Sean Lambert	Samantha Silver & Joey Manderino	November 24, 2013	304	3.09
Guest stars: Andy Milder as Lester Dawson, Kiersey Clemons as Kira Starr, Alexa Rose Russo as Hazel
50	5	"Mix-Ups & Mistletoe"	Adam Weissman	Rick Nyholm	December 1, 2013	310	3.20
Trish is organizing a club for Kids on Christmas in which Austin and Ally will perform their original Christmas song and distribute Austin Moon dolls. However, a mess in the toy factory makes Austin have long hair and behave like a baby doll, so Ally and Trish need to stop Austin from giving out the dolls. Meanwhile, Trish puts Dez and Chuck in a competition to determine who is a better Santa Claus for Christmas, but Trish uses them to do her work. Throughout the episode, Austin and Ally purposely go under a mistletoe and try to kiss, but they are interrupted by Dez twice. Guest stars: John Paul Green as Chuck, Alexa Rose Russo as Hazel, Zoe Pessin as Hanna
51	6	"Glee Clubs & Glory"	Shelley Jensen	Meg DeLoatch	January 19, 2014	313	3.02
Austin joins Ally in her glee club. However, when he has an idea to change the club a bit and Ally doesn't like it, he, Trish, and other children start their own rivaling Glee Club. Dez joins Ally's team so she has enough members. However, because of their fighting the coach kicks both Austin and Ally out of the club, making Dez the new club president. Dez's leadership, dance moves, and ideas are so strange and annoying that Austin and Ally make up and Trish gets the coach to let them back in the club. At the competition the Glee Club sings a medley of the songs Austin and Ally wrote together and they win first place. Later at Sonic Boom, the group agrees to keep the trophy on the counter, but they all rush back because they want it. They end up breaking it, then tossing the pieces back, not wanting it anymore. Guest star: Bruno Amato as Coach Simmons
52	7	"Austin & Alias"	Jon Rosenbaum	Steve Freeman & Aaron Ho	January 26, 2014	305	2.75
When Ronnie Ramone forbids Ally from being Austin's songwriter because they are on competing labels, Ally assumes an alias of Roxy Rocket. When Roxy's single becomes a smash hit and calls for a television interview, Ally dresses up as Roxy, a tall, self-confident dancer with a Swedish accent and blonde and pink checkerboard hair, but almost blows her cover when interviewer Jett Deely starts praising Roxy's songwriting over Ally's. When Ronnie finds out the truth, Ally stands up to him. Ronnie agrees to let her stay with his label and write songs for Austin simultaneously and even admits he'd rather have Ally continue doing so than drop her. Meanwhile, Trish becomes very mad when Dez wins a raffle for a $1,000 gift card for the animal print emporium which she wanted to win. Dez agrees to give her the gift card at the end of the week, but each time she insults him, he buys something with the card. This eventually gets out of hand, and Dez nearly depletes the gift card of its money. Guest stars: Russ Marchand as Jett Deely, Joe Rowley as Ronnie Ramone
53	8	"Princesses & Prizes"	Eric Dean Seaton	Rick Nyholm	February 9, 2014	306	2.71
To raise money for Ally's charity, Austin agrees to be in a date auction. A girl named Chelsea pledges $3,000 to go on a date with Austin, causing Ally to get into the auction herself, thinking Chelsea would soon become his new girlfriend. Ally pledges $3,001, but Chelsea then pledges $5,000. Later, Austin is salsa dancing with Chelsea and Ally is jealous, so the only way to cut the dance short is for Dez to spin Ally out of control. Brooke tries to sabotage Austin's dance as well. Although on their "second date" Ally shows up trying to tell Austin that she is jealous, but it turns out that it was Chelsea's little sister's birthday party and then instead of Ally saying what she feels Brooke intervenes and ruins the party. After that, Austin and Ally confess their feelings. In the end, the group is salsa dancing, Austin with Ally and Trish with Dez. Guest stars: Carrie Wampler as Brooke, Sofia Carson as Chelsea
54	9	"Cupids & Cuties"	Eric Dean Seaton	Heath Seifert & Kevin Kopelow	March 9, 2014	307	2.18
Trish gets a visit from a boy, Jace, she is crushing on and acts strangely when they go on a date. She seeks advice from Dr. Cupid, who is actually Dez. He said he came up with a fake name because he thought people would never take him seriously. Trish organizes a radio interview for him, but he reveals he has never been in love, had a girlfriend, or been on a date, so he is exposed as a fraud. He tries getting himself a girlfriend, so his friends attempt to get him out of his funk by giving him advice, but he doesn't use it. He later falls for a beach club worker named Carrie, and they both go to see a Zom Rom Com. Meanwhile, Austin and Ally work on a physics project together. Guest stars: Cameron Deane Stewart as Jace, Hannah Kat Jones as Carrie, Michael-Leon Wooley as D.J. Sonny Smooth
55	10	"Critics & Confidence"	Shannon Flynn	Aaron Ho & Steve Freeman	March 16, 2014	308	2.01
When Austin receives his first negative review from a critic named Kenneth Kreen, he falls into a slump and develops stage fright and Ally, Trish, and Dez try to help him get over it. Ally tries to explain how stage fright works and tells him he will get over it, but ends up having a panic attack herself, Trish tries to help him find his inner peace, and Dez tries to get him to talk to a girl. However, he only becomes more scared after and later receives two more negative reviews after his concerts. Ally talks to Austin and comforts him and tells him that she lost her stage fright only when Austin was with her. In the end, Austin sings a song to Kenneth, a song dedicated to Ally, but Kenneth still gives him a negative review. However, Austin isn't affected by what Kenneth says because he has regained his confidence thanks to the support of his friends. Guest stars: Justin Dray as Kenneth Kreen, Gabrielle Elyse as Tiffany
56	11	"Directors & Divas"	A. Laura James	Teleplay by : Aaron Ho & Steve Freeman; Story by : Joey Manderino & Samantha Silver	April 13, 2014	317	2.31
After Austin and Trish go to a meeting, they announce that Spike Stevens wants Austin to be in his movie and for Ally to write the movie's song. Dez is also hired to be Spike's intern, but he thinks he is Spike's directing assistant. The group meets Austin's co-star, Brandy Braxton, a very spoiled and difficult actress. After Dez finds out he is just an intern he tries to help Spike by keeping Brandy under control. Later, Spike leaves the set because his wife is in labor, so the group persuades Spike to let Dez finish the shooting. Guest stars: Grace Phipps as Brandy Braxton, Brendan Hunt as Spike Stevens
57	12	"Hunks & Homecoming" "Ally's New Crush"	Adam Weissman	Steve Freeman & Aaron Ho	June 22, 2014	311	2.94
Guest stars: Cameron Jebo as Gavin Young, John Paul Green as Chuck, Cassidy Ann Shaffer as Kimmy
58	13	"Fashion Shows & First Impressions" "Austin's New Crush"	Craig Wyrick-Solari	Samantha Silver & Joey Manderino	June 29, 2014	312	2.06
Ally is invited to a fashion show, where she will be wearing the Jub Jub bird coat. When Austin dates Piper, he discovers that she is against animal abuse. However, it turns out that Piper was just testing if he was a great guy or not and tricked Austin into eating vegetables, giving up his things, and spilling paint on the models. When Ally is walking down the runway, the bucket of paint almost spills on her, but Austin saves her. It's then discovered that the fashion show was to raise money for saving the Jub Jub bird and the coat was made from the feathers that fell off it. Later, Austin apologizes for ruining Ally's modeling debut, and she forgives him. Austin and Piper also talk and confirm that they are in a relationship. Guest stars: Cameron Jebo as Gavin Young, Hannah Kat Jones as Carrie, Hayley Erin as Piper, Harry Van Gorkum as Armand Bianchi
59	14	"Fanatics & Favors"	Sean Lambert	Joey Manderino & Samantha Silver	July 13, 2014	309	2.24
In the lead up to a big performance at the beach club, the gang visits Dez's cousin Dwyane, who is a big fan of Austin. Visiting Dwyane's house, they find out that Dwyane is actually Dwyane Wade of the Miami Heat. As the gang hangs out with him, Ally notices some traits of Dwyane that make him seem obsessive over Austin. Austin reassures her that it's nothing, until they find a secret shrine to Austin. The gang freaks out and goes to Sonic Boom, when Dwyane catches them by surprise as he was already there. When Dwyane tells the gang that he wants to be a songwriter, Dez tells the gang that Dwyane wanted to be a lot of things back then, but dropped them as soon as he got to do them. So, Austin decides to make Dwyane think he wrote a song. The performance is a success. Dwyane tells the gang that he knew he didn't write the song. The next day, Dez wheels in a cart of Dwyane's Austin Moon stuff, saying that he found it in the trash. Guest stars: Dwyane Wade as himself, Will Harris as Bogues, Cameron Deane Stewart as Jace
60	15	"Eggs & Extraterrestrials"	Shelley Jensen	Calum Worthy	July 27, 2014	321	2.75
Guest stars: David Magidoff as Zip, Greg Worswick as Zilch
61	16	"Proms & Promises"	Jean Sagal	Kevin Kopelow & Heath Seifert	August 10, 2014	315	2.27
Guest stars: Andy Milder as Lester Dawson, Cameron Jebo as Gavin Young, John Paul Green as Chuck, Hannah Kat Jones as Carrie, Hayley Erin as Piper, Cameron Deane Stewart as Jace
62	17	"Last Dances & Last Chances"	Jon Rosenbaum	Heath Seifert & Kevin Kopelow	August 24, 2014	316	N/A
Austin is threatened by Carrie that she will tell her sister Piper that he'd rather be at the prom with Ally. When Austin and Ally are awarded prom king and queen, Austin confesses to Piper that he still has feelings for Ally and Piper encourages him to tell her. After the two break up, Gavin arrives at the prom and Ally kindly breaks up with him, saying they're not right for each other. Trish and Dez decide to enter the dance competition together, but after they win they realize the prize money gets donated to the wood shop club. Austin and Ally meet up and slow dance together while confessing their feelings for each other. The two then share their third kiss and finally rekindle. Guest stars: John Paul Green as Chuck, Hannah Kat Jones as Carrie, Hayley Erin as Piper, Cassidy Ann Shaffer as Kimmy, Cameron Jebo as Gavin Young, Cameron Deane Stewart as Jace, Kahyun Kim as Sun Hee
63	18	"Videos & Villains"	Craig Wyrick-Solari	Amelia Sims	September 21, 2014	320	1.89
Guest stars: Russ Marchand as Jett Deely, Carrie Wampler as Brooke
64	19	"Beauties & Bullies"	Rich Correll	Kevin Kopelow & Heath Seifert	September 28, 2014	319	2.07
Trish gets the lead in the school play, but ends up getting bullied online with comments telling her that she's not pretty. After saying she doesn't care, she goes into the school auditorium to cry. She is later caught by Ally crying while reading hate comments about her. Austin, Dez, and Carrie follow, hugging her for comfort while she cries. The bullying goes too far and Trish keeps on calling in sick every day to avoid going to school. Trish later tells Ally that she is going to drop out of school. Ally tells Austin and the two make a song which Austin performs at Shredders. However, Trish still refuses to go to school. It is play night and Dez and Carrie figure out the bully is Margo. After Dez and Carrie put a skunk in Margo's face, Trish gets upset with them for getting back at Margo. Trish informs Coach Simmons about the problem and nicely tells Margo to stop. Margo apologizes, revealing that she was jealous of Trish and promises to stop posting hate. The play continues and nobody makes fun of Trish anymore. Guest stars: Hannah Kat Jones as Carrie, Bruno Amato as Coach Simmons, Christine Rodriguez as Margo, Cassidy Ann Shaffer as Kimmy
65	20	"Horror Stories & Halloween Scares"	Rich Correll	Jay Dyer	October 5, 2014	318	2.42
Guest star: Megan B. Richie as Esmeralda
66	21	"Records & Wrecking Balls"	Ken Ceizler	Rick Nyholm	October 12, 2014	314	2.08
As her album is preparing to be released, Ally realizes that with all the time she's spending with her music, she won't have time to work at Sonic Boom anymore and is forced to quit, which allows Lester to finally sell the store. However, when the group finds out that the new owner, Ms. Krum, wants to demolish Sonic Boom to turn it into a box store, they must find a way to stop Lester before it's too late. Meanwhile, Carrie requests Trish and Dez's help to find a new job when she gets fired from Shredder's. In the end, Carrie starts working at Sonic Boom, taking Ally's place while she is promoting her album. Guest stars: Andy Milder as Lester Dawson, Pamela Dunlap as Ms. Krum, Russ Marchand as Jett Deely, Hannah Kat Jones as Carrie
67	22	"Relationships & Red Carpets"	Shelley Jensen	Rick Nyholm	November 23, 2014	322	2.90
Austin and Ally have been nominated for best debut album at the WMAs and are excited to reveal their relationship to the public. However, Jimmy Starr tells Austin that he can't have a girlfriend as he has millions of teenage girl fans. Jimmy orders Austin and Ally to keep their relationship a secret and forbids them from going to the WMAs together. Meanwhile, Carrie reveals that she is moving to L.A., which breaks Dez's heart. At the WMAs, Austin consults Jimmy about him not wanting to hide his relationship with Ally, but Jimmy warns him that he would be forbidden to produce music, albums, or go on tour due to his contract with Starr Records. Ally meets Austin outside, saying that she doesn't want him to have to choose between her and his career. Austin and Ally reluctantly break up, leaving Ally in tears. Afterward, Dez reveals to Austin that he is moving to L.A. to be with Carrie and attend film school due to his love for her. During the award show, Austin goes on stage and confesses that he doesn't care about his career anymore. The two share their fourth kiss onstage and get back together, again, with the audience cheering. With Austin's career gone, he goes with Ally on her first tour while Trish starts her own management company with a bunch of new clients. The group hugs and leaves while Ally gets her songbook and walks out of Sonic Boom with Austin. Guest stars: John Henson as Mike Moon, Jill Benjamin as Mimi Moon, Richard Whiten as Jimmy Starr, Andy Milder as Lester Dawson, Hannah Kat Jones as Carrie, Tyne Stecklein as Jasmine Fierra, Chelsea Harris as Nikki Rush

=== Season 4 (2015–16) ===
No. overall	No. in season	Title	Directed by	Written by	Original release date	Prod. code	U.S. viewers (millions)
68	1	"Buzzcuts & Beginnings"	Shelley Jensen	Heath Seifert & Kevin Kopelow	January 18, 2015	401	3.08
After Ally's tour ends in Miami, the group finally reunites after everyone, except Austin, has been busy. Austin is excited to spend his senior year of high school with his friends, but finds out that they're still too busy for him. Ally is asked to go on a European tour by Ronnie Ramone, Trish is about to go on tour to manage a British boy band, and Dez is returning from Miami for three days only to shoot a short film for his film class in L.A. Austin asks his mother what he should do now that his friends don't have time for him anymore. She tells him to find a new passion, so he enrolls into a military school. Meanwhile, Ally reveals that she'd rather stay in Miami with her friends during their senior year of high school, Trish reveals that she hates her managing job with the British boys and wants to stay in Miami, and Dez reveals that he and Carrie broke up and that he doesn't want to return to L.A. When the group is about to tell Austin that they changed their minds, they find out that Austin is going to a military school and must stop him before he is enrolled. When they get there, Ally and Trish struggle to distract the guard while Dez sneaks past him. They finally catch Austin in a barber shop about to get his hair shaved off. However, when they try to stop him, they find out it's the wrong person. They soon find Austin and tell him that they gave up on their plans and they will stay in Miami together. Guest star: Jill Benjamin as Mimi Moon
69	2	"Mattress Stores & Music Factories"	Shelley Jensen	Kevin Kopelow & Heath Seifert	January 25, 2015	402	2.22
Austin is unable to find another way to put his singing and music skills to use. He cannot find a new hobby to keep him occupied. Austin feels obligated to take a job at his parents' mattress store when his parents offer him a job. Austin does not like his new job because the job is boring. Ally struggles to teach an influx of music students all about how to play musical instruments, singing, and dancing. Ally is overwhelmed with teaching music and feels stressed out. Trish and Dez try to help Austin and Ally to come up with a plan that will relieve Austin's boredom and Ally's stress. Trish and Dez want both of their problems to be resolved. Guest stars: John Henson as Mike Moon, Jill Benjamin as Mimi Moon, Andy Milder as Lester Dawson, Mimi Kirkland as Lily
70	3	"Grand Openings & Great Expectations"	Eric Dean Seaton	Samantha Silver & Joey Manderino	February 8, 2015	403	2.07
Austin and Ally are excited to finally open the A&A Music Factory, but when Dez and Trish exaggerate about their teaching skills to the press, saying that they can teach first time students how to play in just a week, Austin and Ally find themselves stuck to a promise they don't think they can keep. They find themselves teaching inexperienced students: Ally's former pupil Lily, gamer Max, skateboarder Dylan, and baseball player Herman. At first, Team Austin is doubtful about the kids' skills: Herman struggles with poor eyesight; Max is uninterested in learning piano and would rather play a game on his phone; Dylan has mixed emotions about playing in a band and randomly leaves; and Lily is unable at playing any instrument, though she eventually chooses a double bass that she struggled to play. Team Austin attempt to hire extras to drown out their sound and give the kids smaller, meaningless roles, but they decide to stick to their original promise. They're successful when they start to connect to the students on a personal level: Ally gives Lily a standard bass guitar she can handle more easily; Dez links the video game Max was playing to the keyboard, motivating him; and Ally and Trish give Herman a pair of glasses to fix his eyesight. Dylan remained conflicted and eventually quit, as she didn't want her friends to make fun of her for pursuing something outside of her main interest. Austin tells her a story about how he took ballroom dance classes as a kid and learning to ignore teasing, but Dylan still chooses not to return. At the grand opening, the gang is unable to stall, but Dylan shows up right on time, revealing that the story helped her as it gave her friends something lamer to laugh at. In the end, the band performs successfully. Guest stars: Briana Lane as Beverly, Mimi Kirkland as Lily, Isaak Presley as Max, Claire Engler as Dylan, Mar Mar as Herman
71	4	"Seniors & Señors"	Eric Dean Seaton	Steve Freeman & Aaron Ho	February 15, 2015	404	2.35
The group's plans to enjoy their senior year together are put on hold when Austin learns that he's a credit short. Austin fears of not going to any other senior occasions with his friends, so he insists on studying to retake his test. Meanwhile, Ally and Dez are assigned to be partners in chemistry class, much to Ally's dismay, while Trish uses flashcards to help Austin with Spanish, but he still struggles, so she hires a Spanish musician to help Austin since Austin knows a lot about lyrics. Meanwhile, Ally learns that Dez didn't want to be partners with her, so they compromise in order to ace their project. At the end of the week, Austin sings a song he wrote to impresses his Spanish teacher of his knowledge. Austin proves his comprehension of Spanish and Señora Gomez passes him. Guest stars: Bruno Amato as Coach Simmons, Kahyun Kim as Sun Hee, Alex Meneses as Señora Gomez
72	5	"Homework & Hidden Talents"	Craig Wyrick-Solari	Heath Seifert & Kevin Kopelow	March 28, 2015	405	1.41
Ally wants to prove to Austin that she can unlock the hidden musical talent of a new student who lives her life under the shadow of her older sister, Violet, a self-taught teenage violin virtuoso. Austin and Ally make a bet with each other over her ability to teach Shelby to play the violin. Depending on which of the two loses the bet, Ally will give Austin a five-foot wide pancake and Austin will give Ally a token with a sun and moon on it. Along the way, they find that Shelby is a much better dancer than a violin player. Meanwhile, Trish has to do a book report but instead decides to make a film adaptation of the book with the help of Dez. She later finds out the events Dez has made her do don't happen in the book. Guest stars: Maddie Ziegler as Shelby, Brooke Sorenson as Violet
73	6	"Duos & Deception"	Jean Sagal	Joey Manderino & Samantha Silver	April 19, 2015	409	2.22
Ally spins a chore wheel so everyone has something to do while the health inspector is in town. When Trish books brother–sister duo Bobbie and Billie, the A&A Music Factory gets a lot of attention. They have trouble figuring who is Billie and who is Bobbie. Problems with the store begin arising, such as there being ketchup and mustard in the instruments and a rat infestation. Ally starts blaming Austin, Trish, and Dez for this. While Austin and Ally are cleaning downstairs, Billie and Bobbie tell them to go and get something to eat. Billie and Bobbie tell Trish and Dez that Austin and Ally have gone so they go to the mall and ask them why they are here. They say that Billie and Bobbie told them to. They then know that Billie and Bobbie are playing them. They ask Lily if she knows anything, and she tells them that Billie and Bobbie are opening the B&B Music Factory next door. Trish says the best way to get back at them is in front of a live-streamed audience. Austin and Dez tell Billie that Bobbie said she was the star of the show. Ally and Trish tell Bobbie that Billie said he is the star of the show. The two argue in front of the audience and then storm off. Dez and Lily sing the Billie and Bobbie theme song while replacing Billie and Bobbie with Dezzy and Lily. In the end, Billie and Bobbie apologize for their actions. Special guest star: Dove Cameron as Bobbie Guest stars: Ryan McCartan as Billie, Mimi Kirkland as Lily, Leslie David Baker as Mr. Schxlumbraugh
74	7	"Wedding Bells & Wacky Birds"	Adam Weissman	Rachel McNevin	May 3, 2015	406	1.95
Austin and Ally are given an assignment in life skills class. They have to choose one of five topics that will teach them about responsibility and how to deal with life's problems. They choose the marriage assignment and are paired up together and have to create a fake wedding using a fake budget. Meanwhile, Ally is called back into the music studio to finish writing and recording new songs. Austin feels left alone and has a dream where he and Ally are married with octuplets. In the dream, Ally is always busy working and touring around the world while Austin is left to take care of the children and all other problems at home. Trish books Dez a job directing a commercial for Armand Bianchi's new fragrance, Emu, which reunites Dez with his ex-girlfriend, Carrie. Dez does not want to work with Carrie because he is not over her dumping him. Carrie tells Trish that Dez dumped her at a restaurant they ate at several months ago. Later, Trish discovers that Dez and Carrie misinterpreted what they said to each other at the restaurant. Trish tells Dez and Carrie they never broke up. Ally feels terrible that Austin had to complete the marriage assignment on his own, so she makes him a six-layer white chocolate cake. Trish helps Ally take the cake to the life skills class at school. As Ally and Trish travel to the class, the cake falls apart. When they arrive at the class, Ally only has a handful of cake in her hand. Austin and Ally later make up in the life skills class by kissing each other. Guest stars: Hannah Kat Jones as Carrie, Harry Van Gorkum as Armand Bianchi, Carla Delaney as Ms. Townsend
75	8	"Karaoke & Kalamity"	Shelley Jensen	Aaron Ho & Steve Freeman	June 14, 2015	412	1.75
Guest stars: Richard Whiten as Jimmy Starr, Skylar Stecker as Ridley Rogers
76	9	"Mini-Me's & Muffin Baskets"	Shelley Jensen	Samantha Silver & Joey Manderino	June 21, 2015	413	2.02
Guest stars: Richard Whiten as Jimmy Starr, Mar Mar as Herman, Skylar Stecker as Ridley Rogers, Lauren Lindsey Donzis as Sadie, Isaak Presley as Max
77	10	"Dancers & Ditzes"	Adam Weissman	Kevin Kopelow & Heath Seifert	July 12, 2015	407	2.25
Ally is performing at the Miami Video Music Awards, but the producers are worried about her dancing abilities. Trish convinces the producers to give her a chance to prove herself, and has until Friday to prove that she can dance well. Austin trains her to dance better, but Austin and Trish do not believe that she will be ready for the performance and cancel the audition that was made. When Ally finds out, she is crushed that her friends did not believe in her. Austin and Trish feel horrible. Later, Ally delivers an incredible performance at the show and proves to her friends that she can dance. She admits that the fact that her friends did not believe in her actually motivated her to prove them wrong. Meanwhile, Carrie has to go back to L.A., but she does not want to go. Trish and Dez get her a job at the award show to hand out trophies to the winners. They teach Carrie to not drop the trophies as she hands them out. Special guest star: Becky G Guest stars: Hannah Kat Jones as Carrie, Katie Wee as Sheila Berman, Russ Marchand as Jett Deely
78	11	"Mysteries & Meddling Kids"	A. Laura James	Steve Freeman & Aaron Ho	July 26, 2015	417	2.18
The group goes to a 1970s party dressed as characters from a cartoon. At the party Ally's songbook is stolen and a note is left saying that Ally has something that this person wants and that the songbook will have one page ripped out each day until there is nothing left. They head to the library where the librarian says she saw the thief wearing a white disco suit and a blonde Afro. When they head back they see that Chuck, Kimmy, and Miles all are wearing the suit. As they try to find out who stole the book, each person is found with a piece of evidence. Chuck is found singing Ally's new song, Kimmy has the same cutout letters used in the note by her locker, and Miles has Ally's bookmark in his pocket. They decide to trap all the suspects in the same room until someone breaks. While they are questioning them Chuck disappears. The group goes to find him and Ally gets a text from the thief saying to meet them at the photo booth if she ever wants to see her book again. When Ally gets there the thief ends up pushing her into and locking her in the photo booth with a broom and runs off. The group is led back to the library when they notice Ally's missing. The librarian suggests that Trish and Dez search the school while Austin and her stay in the library. Trish and Dez find Ally trapped in the photo booth. Ally tells them that the librarian shoved her in there. Ally, Trish, and Dez run into the library to tell Austin who is eating pancakes the librarian made him. When they get there she escapes. Dez releases Groovy the Goat and he jumps on top of her. When they look at her they realize it's a mask. They pull it off and see that Brooke was the thief. She stole Ally's songbook to get Austin back. The next day the group treats Chuck, Kimmy, and Miles to frozen yogurt as an apology. Guest stars: John Paul Green as Chuck, Sherry Weston as Mrs. Kravitz, Carrie Wampler as Brooke, Cassidy Ann Shaffer as Kimmy
79	12	"Comebacks & Crystal Balls"	Craig Wyrick-Solari	Jeny Quine	August 9, 2015	408	2.17
Trish books Austin his comeback concert, but he gets worried after a psychic tells him his great expectations will end in failure. Dez helps Austin with his big entrance, but everything goes wrong when Austin ends up having a patched eye and a hurt toe. Austin decides to tell Dez he can't plan his entrance, but before that he gets stuck in an unbreakable box and has to perform in it. Dez finds out and comes up with a plan to help Austin who regrets letting him down. Austin performs his new song "Take It from the Top" inside the box. During the song, Dez sets him free, and Austin finishes his show and they both make up. Meanwhile, the psychic tells Trish that she'll meet a black haired well-mannered prince who happens to be a puppy whose name is Prince; Trish falls in love with him. Austin's fortune comes true because he forgot to do his book report on Great Expectations by Charles Dickens. Guest star: Pamala Tyson as Miss Claire
80	13	"Burdens & Boynado"	Shelley Jensen	Joey Manderino & Samantha Silver	August 23, 2015	418	1.94
Trish's boy band client, Boynado, cannot agree on anything. Trish and Dez make up a camp to help them get along. However, the last activity pushes the band to its limits, making them split up. Dez makes Trish realize that Rupert is causing all the problems. If she can find a replacement then Boynado can get back together. Meanwhile, Austin and Ally help an Austin Moon impersonator named Benny get back on his feet. Nobody listens to him anymore now that Austin can sing again. Austin offers him to stay at their music factory. Unfortunately, Benny begins taking advantage of the place, leaving messes and procrastinating about what he is going to do in the future. Ally eventually gets Austin to kick him out. While Benny is finishing packing, nearby, Trish explains that the problem with Boynado is Rupert. Benny hears and explains that Rupert is his favorite Boynado member and he knows all of Rupert's parts. Trish hires Benny to replace Rupert in the band. Benny does an amazing job and no longer lives at the music school. Special guest star: Rico Rodriguez as Benny Guest stars: Chris Trousdale as Rupert, Luke O'Sullivan as Nigel, Kylend Hetherington as Devin
81	14	"Bad Seeds & Bad Dates"	A. Laura James	Jeny Quine	September 20, 2015	411	1.83
The gang notices that Ally's dad is acting a bit unusual. After discovering his paintings are a bit more romantic than usual, Ally deduces that he has a girlfriend, which he does, a woman named Joanna. Meanwhile, a student at the music factory, Mikey, acts out frequently, much to the chagrin of everybody else. The gang plan to kick Mikey out when his mom visited the next day. The next day, it turns out that Mikey's mom was Joanna, so they couldn't kick Mikey out. That night, when Lester took Joanna out on a birthday dinner, she left Mikey with Team Austin. While playing a game, Mikey ties up Ally and locks Austin, Trish and Dez in the studio room. Herman lets them free, and they follow Mikey to the restaurant Lester took Joanna out to. They find that Mikey is planning to use a stink bomb to humiliate Lester, but Austin disposes of it at the last second. However, Mikey had revealed that he replaced the candle on his mom's cake with a firecracker, leading Ally to run and unintentionally destroy the cake, but the firecracker didn't go off. Joanna insults Ally for trying to ruin her birthday, but Lester tells her off by saying that he wouldn't date anyone who insulted Ally. Joanna and Mikey leave as Austin tells her that Mikey is banned from the music factory. Guest stars: Andy Milder as Lester Dawson, Mar Mar as Herman, Dillon Fitzgerald as Mikey, Jean Villepique as Joanna
82	15	"Scary Spirits & Spooky Stories"	Andy Fickman	Garron Ma	October 4, 2015	414	2.13
Special guest stars: Kamil McFadden as Ernie Cooper, Trinitee Stokes as Judy Cooper
83	16	"Rejection & Rocketships"	Raini Rodriguez	Rachel McNevin	November 8, 2015	415	1.79
Ally is desperate to be admitted to Harvard University, and is granted an interview. Trish exaggerates Ally's accomplishments to the interviewer to help her, but Ally is denied admission. As a result, she becomes a pizza-loving slacker, who cares nothing for her studies. Eventually the others snap her out of it, and Ally is granted a second interview, where this time, she is honest. Ally is subsequently admitted to Harvard. Meanwhile, Austin and Dez, upon learning that their favorite childhood ride, a supermarket rocket, is being removed, spend every minute riding it while they still can. It eventually turns out it's only being relocated to a nearby store. Guest stars: Robin Riker as Ms. Jackson, Bryant Tardy as Gabe
84	17	"Cap and Gown & Can't Be Found"	D.W. Moffett	Jeny Quine	November 22, 2015	416	1.73
Guest star: John Paul Green as Chuck
85	18	"Santas & Surprises"	Jean Sagal	Wayne Conley	December 6, 2015	410	1.51
Lily is sad that her father can never come to visit and would rather not celebrate Christmas at all. Meanwhile, Trish is promoted to head elf by Santa and orders Dez and others around using the excuse that Santa asked for it. However, after Dez interacts with Santa, he becomes the head elf, but he lets the power go to his head, causing Trish and his assistants to throw things at him later in order to bring him down. Later, Austin and Ally schedule a trip to Ecuador after finding out that Lily's father would be there. The plan is to hold a concert and then bring Lily's father back with them. It turns out, however, that Lily's father left in the morning to go on an important mission. It turns out that his special mission was visiting Lily in Miami thanks to some help from Dez. Dez apologizes to Trish and his assistants, explaining that his heart was in the right place, but that he overdid it. Guest stars: Mimi Kirkland as Lily, Mar Mar as Herman, Jim O'Heir as Santa
86	19	"Musicals & Moving On"	Craig Wyrick-Solari	Aaron Ho & Steve Freeman	January 10, 2016	420	2.89
Guest star: Brendan Hunt as Spike Stevens
87	20	"Duets & Destiny"	Shelley Jensen	Heath Seifert & Kevin Kopelow	January 10, 2016	419	3.20
Four years after the events of Musicals and Moving On, Austin and Ally are revealed to have broken up due to their business with touring and school respectively, upsetting Trish and Dez. After graduating from Harvard, Ally returns to Miami where Trish reveals she booked her on the Helen Show. However, Austin also appears on the show and they have an awkward reunion. Backstage they both reveal that they miss each other and perform a duet on live TV. Austin and Ally then decide to become a singing duo and officially reunite, much to the joy of Trish and Dez. Ally then accidentally destroys the set, similar to how she did in the pilot episode. Flash forward to 10 years later, Austin and Ally are married and have two kids while still performing. Trish and Dez then show up at the music factory for a visit. Dez is now a successful movie director and has a son, ironically highly intelligent, with his wife Carrie. While Trish, now an award-winning actress, married Chuck and they have a daughter who is a pageant superstar. The four friends reminisce their time together and say no matter where life takes them, they'll always be best friends. In the final scene, Austin and Ally are upstairs looking to write a new song and they end up performing the show's intro. Guest stars: Mim Drew as Helen, John Paul Green as Chuck, Hannah Kat Jones as Carrie
