= Austin & Ally: Turn It Up =

Soundtrack album by Ross Lynch and Laura Marano
- Released: December 17, 2013
- Recorded: 2012–2013
- Genre: Pop; pop rock; dance-pop
- Length: 42:16
- Label: Walt Disney

Ross Lynch chronology
Teen Beach Movie (2013)	Austin & Ally: Turn It Up (2013)	Austin & Ally: Take It from the Top (2015)

Laura Marano chronology
Austin & Ally: Turn It Up (2013)	Austin & Ally: Take It from the Top (2015)

Austin & Ally chronology
Austin & Ally (2012)	Austin & Ally: Turn It Up (2013)	Austin & Ally: Take It from the Top (2015)

Austin & Ally: Turn It Up is the second soundtrack of the Disney Channel Original Series, Austin & Ally, following the debut soundtrack of the same name (2012). Austin & Ally: Turn It Up features songs from the second and third seasons.

This soundtrack introduces Laura Marano who sings, along with Ross Lynch, almost the entirety of the soundtrack, with the only exceptions being the Walmart bonus track "Face to Face", which is a duet between Lynch and fellow Disney Channel star Debby Ryan from the crossover Austin & Jessie & Ally All Star New Year, and the final standard edition track "Unstoppable", which was performed in the series by the fifth season winners of Radio Disney's The Next Big Thing, Chloe x Halle.

== Track listing ==
Austin & Ally: Turn It Up – Standard edition
No.	Title	Writer(s)	Artist(s)	Length
1.	"Upside Down"	Alex Cantrall; Jeff Hoeppner; Matt Wong	Ross Lynch	3:38
2.	"Me and You"	JD Webb	Laura Marano	2:47
3.	"Who U R"	Dan Book; Alexei Misoul; Drew Seeley	Ross Lynch	3:34
4.	"Superhero"	Ava Kay; Tyler Shaw; Matt Tishler	Ross Lynch	3:23
5.	"Parachute"	Gannin Arnold; Andy Dodd; Adam Watts	Laura Marano	3:14
6.	"What We're About"	Book; Misoul	Ross Lynch	3:33
7.	"Chasin' the Beat of My Heart"	Johan Alkenäs; Jonas Lundblad; Charlie Mason; Niclas Molinder; Joacim Persson	Ross Lynch	3:18
8.	"Stuck on You"	Adam Anders; Nikki Anders; Peer Åström	Ross Lynch	2:36
9.	"Redial"	Aris Archontis; Jeannie Lurie; Julia Michaels; Chen Neeman	Laura Marano	2:27
10.	"Steal Your Heart"	Book; Jamie Houston; Misoul	Ross Lynch	3:21
11.	"Better than This"	Antonina Armato; Tim James; Adam Smeaton	Ross Lynch	3:15
12.	"I Think About You"	Book; Misoul	Ross Lynch	3:25
13.	"Unstoppable"	Jay L'Oreal; Adrian Newman	Chloe x Halle	3:45
Total length:				42:16

Austin & Ally: Turn It Up – Walmart edition (bonus tracks)
No.	Title	Artist(s)	Length
14.	"Finally Me"	Laura Marano	2:44
15.	"Face to Face"	Ross Lynch and Debby Ryan	2:34
16.	"Who I Am"	Ross Lynch	2:48

Austin & Ally: Turn It Up – Japan edition (bonus tracks)
No.	Title	Artist(s)	Length
14.	"Who I Am"	Ross Lynch	2:48
15.	"Don't Look Down"	Ross Lynch and Laura Marano	3:22
16.	"Got It 2"	Ross Lynch	2:32

Notes

- Due to a misprinting error, all physical copies of the Walmart edition list "Finally Me" as being performed by Ross Lynch, instead of Laura Marano.

== Charts ==
=== Weekly charts ===
Chart (2014)	Peak position
US Billboard 200	89
US Kid Albums (Billboard)	2
US Soundtrack Albums (Billboard)	6

=== Year-end charts ===
Chart (2014)	Position
US Soundtrack Albums (Billboard)	22

== Notes ==
- ^{^a} contains an uncredited interpolation of Jack Johnson's 2006 song of the same name
- ^{^b} winners of Radio Disney's NBT: Next Big Thing
- ^{^c} first heard in the hour-long crossover special Austin & Jessie & Ally All Star New Year
