= Austin & Jessie & Ally All Star New Year =

2012 episode of Jessie/Austin & Ally

- Crossover event
- Promotional image
- Directed by: Bob Koherr
- Written by: Wayne Conley; Mike Montesano; Ted Zizik
- Original air date: December 7, 2012

Part 1: Austin & Ally
- Episode title: "Austin & Jessie & Ally All Star New Year: Part 1"
- Episode no.: Season 2 Episode 6
- Production code: 211

Episode chronology
← Previous "Crybabies & Cologne"	Next → "Ferris Wheels & Funky Breath"

Part 2: Jessie
- Episode title: "Austin & Jessie & Ally All Star New Year: Part 2"
- Episode no.: Season 2 Episode 6
- Production code: 207

Episode chronology
← Previous "Trashin' Fashion"	Next → "The Trouble with Tessie"

"Austin & Jessie & Ally All Star New Year" is a special crossover two-part television episodes of two Disney Channel original sitcoms which premiered in the United States on December 7, 2012. Part 1 is an episode of Austin & Ally, while part 2 is an episode of Jessie. Austin, Ally, Trish and Dez join regulars from Jessie in New York City, while Jessie and Emma meet Austin and think that he can turn Jessie's songs into big hits.

== Plot ==
=== Part 1 - Austin & Ally: "Big Dreams & Big Apples" ===
Austin (Ross Lynch), Ally (Laura Marano), Dez (Calum Worthy), and Trish (Raini Rodriguez) travel to New York City where Austin is booked to perform at Times Square on New Year's Eve. (Although Trish really booked him at Tim's Square Pizza instead of Times Square). Trish is then forced to fix this whole situation. Trish takes Jimmy Starr's computer while he's being distracted by Dez and talks to a musical agent of the company to see if he can fix the whole mess. Later on, the mess is fixed. Except trouble ensues when the plane suffers mechanical problems and is diverted to Philadelphia. During this time, the show reverts to Jessie (Debby Ryan), and Emma (Peyton List). The latter becomes ecstatic after discovering Austin's newly scheduled performance. Despite Jessie's objections, she agrees to take Emma to Times Square to watch the performance. They quickly come up with a solution and decide to take a cab to New York, but they are kicked off when they cannot afford the fare for going a far distance. As both Emma and Jessie, and the four make their way through the crowd, security won't let Austin through, before the six meet. Jessie flies Austin to the stage in the Ross' helicopter, saving Austin, whose contract with Starr Records would have been terminated.

=== Part 2 - Jessie: "Nanny in Miami" ===
After the performance, Bertram the butler (Kevin Chamberlin), Luke (Cameron Boyce), Ravi (Karan Brar) and Emma arrive and tell Jessie that Zuri (Skai Jackson) had been separated in the chaos, and stuck on the Times Square Ball. They attempt to save her (despite the time being six minutes to midnight) but when they succeed in it, Luke and Ravi accidentally turn off the power in New York City. Jessie lets the gang stay at their apartment in hopes that Austin will record one of her songs and turn it into a big hit, and there, they meet the rest of the Ross family. When Ally reads Jessie's lyrics, she thinks they're not good, so Jessie accidentally steals Zuri's poem and takes credit for it. Later on, Jessie and the kids travel to Miami where Austin and Jessie will sing a duet at his next concert. To prevent Zuri from finding out about the song, Jessie cuts the strings from Austin's guitar and ruins it. Eventually Zuri finds out, so she ends up giving Jessie credit because she knows how much it means to her, because acting and creative writing didn't work out for her. In the end, when Austin and Jessie give an unforgettable performance, Jessie gives Zuri credit and Dez makes an awesome music video, which has everyone satisfied.

== Cast ==
=== Austin & Ally ===
- Ross Lynch as Austin Moon
- Laura Marano as Ally Dawson
- Raini Rodriguez as Trish
- Calum Worthy as Dez

=== Jessie ===
- Debby Ryan as Jessie
- Peyton List as Emma
- Cameron Boyce as Luke
- Karan Brar as Ravi
- Skai Jackson as Zuri
- Kevin Chamberlin as Bertram

== Opening sequence ==
The opening sequence and theme song to Austin & Jessie & Ally All Star New Year is a remix of the two shows' opening sequences and theme songs in a format of a skyscraper twisting and turning to the two shows' theme songs; it starts with Austin & Ally and followed by Jessie. Main cast of both shows is shown in the opening sequence.

== Reception ==
The broadcast was watched by 4.8 million viewers, becoming the highest-rated program of the night on both broadcast and specialty television. It was also the second highest-rated cable broadcast of 2012.

== "Can You Feel It" ==
"Can You Feel It"

Single by Ross Lynch
- Released: October 16, 2012
- Recorded: 2012
- Genre: Pop rock
- Length: 2:48
- Label: Walt Disney
- Songwriters: Joleen Belle, Anthony Anderson, Steve Smith
- Producers: Joleen Belle, Anthony Anderson, Steve Smith

Ross Lynch singles chronology
"Heard It on the Radio" (2012)	"Can You Feel It" (2012)

"Can You Feel It" is a song sung by Ross Lynch for the TV series Austin & Ally. The song was written and produced by Joleen Belle, Steve Smith, Anthony Anderson and released on October 16, 2012.

=== Live performances ===
On October 19, 2012, Lynch performed the song during the Shake It Up: Make Your Mark Dance Off special TV show on Disney Channel.

=== Track listings ===
- U.S. / Digital download
1. "Can You Feel It" – 2:48

=== Charts ===
Chart (2012)	Peak position
US Kid Digital Songs (Billboard)	1

=== Release history ===
Country	Date	Format	Label
United States	October 16, 2012	Digital download	Walt Disney Records

== See also ==
- List of Austin & Ally episodes
- List of Jessie episodes
