= Mini 12 =

Mini 12 may refer to:

- 2.4 Metre (keelboat), an open class single-handed yacht
- Illusion (keelboat), a one-design single-handed yacht
- Inspiron Mini 12, one of the Dell Inspiron Mini series of netbook computers
