= World of Silence =

Studio album by Borealis
- Released: September 12, 2008
- Recorded: 2008 at The Recording House studio
- Genres: Power metal, progressive metal
- Length: 58:19
- Label: Independent
- Producer: Borealis

Borealis chronology
World of Silence (2008)	Fall from Grace (2011)

Professional ratings
Review scores
Source	Rating
Metal Crypt	4/5 stars
Metalreviews	4/5 stars

World of Silence is the debut studio album by the Canadian power metal band by Borealis. It was released in 2008 independently in North America.

== Track listing ==
All tracks are written by Borealis.

No.	Title	Length
1.	"Lost Voices"	6:09
2.	"Midnight City"	6:16
3.	"From the Fading Screams"	5:26
4.	"Forget the Past"	6:01
5.	"Eyes of a Dream"	6:57
6.	"World of Silence"	4:42
7.	"The Afterlife"	6:20
8.	"Divine Answer"	5:24
9.	"The Dawning Light"	5:10
10.	"Black Rose"	5:54
Total length:		58:19

== Personnel ==
- Matt Marinelli – vocals, guitars
- Sean Werlick – keyboards
- Jamie Smith – bass guitar
- Sean Dowell – drums

Production

- Sean Gregory – recording, engineering, mixing
- Andy VanDette – mastering
