= Austin & Ally =

American comedy television series

- Genre: Comedy
- Created by: Kevin Kopelow & Heath Seifert
- Starring: Ross Lynch; Laura Marano; Raini Rodriguez; Calum Worthy
- Theme music composer: Joleen Belle; Mike McGarity; Julia Michaels
- Opening theme: "Can't Do It Without You" (Note: Performed by Ross Lynch in the first three seasons, and Ross Lynch & Laura Marano in the fourth season.)
- Composers: Rick Butler & Fred Rapoport
- Country of origin: United States
- Original language: English
- No. of seasons: 4
- No. of episodes: 87 (list of episodes)

Production
- Executive producers: Kevin Kopelow & Heath Seifert; Rick Nyholm; Jeny Quine
- Producer: Craig Wyrick-Solari
- Camera setup: Multi-camera
- Running time: 21–26 minutes
- Production companies: Kevin & Heath Productions; It's a Laugh Productions

Original release
- Network: Disney Channel
- Release: December 2, 2011 – January 10, 2016

Austin & Ally is an American comedy television series created by Kevin Kopelow and Heath Seifert that aired on Disney Channel from December 2, 2011 to January 10, 2016. The series stars Ross Lynch, Laura Marano, Raini Rodriguez, and Calum Worthy.

Set in Miami, Florida, the series focuses on the relationship between two very different musicians: extroverted and fun-loving singer and instrumentalist Austin Moon and introverted and awkward songwriter Ally Dawson, who is also a singer, but has a bad case of stage fright.

== Plot ==
In "Rockers & Writers", Austin overhears Ally singing a song she's written. Later, he changes the tempo of the song and sings it himself, although he's completely forgotten it's the same song he heard Ally singing. He becomes famous from it after his best friend, Dez, directs Austin in a music video for the song and posts it on the Internet, making Austin an overnight sensation. Once Ally takes credit for her song, she and Austin work together on a second song. At the end of the episode, Austin convinces her to become his partner, and the two agree to work together and eventually become close friends. Ally's best friend, Trish, pitches in as Austin's manager and Dez continues to direct Austin's music videos. At the end of the first season, Austin gets signed to Jimmy Starr's record label.

The second season sees both Austin and Ally taking bigger steps. Ally conquers her stage fright by performing a duet with Austin. By the end of the second season, Ally signs a record deal and records an album with Ronnie Ramone, while Austin goes on his first national tour. Due to her schedule with Ronnie Ramone, Ally is unable to attend the first half of Austin's tour, but in the first two episodes of the third season, Ally does attend the second half of the tour.

In the third season, Ally's career takes off. Later, Ally is making her first album. By the end of the third season, Austin sacrifices his music career when his record label forbids him from being together with Ally. Austin chooses to be with Ally as they confess their love for each other. In the end, Austin goes with Ally on her first tour, Trish starts her own management company, and Dez goes to film school in Los Angeles.

In the fourth season, the group reunites after the tour and turns Sonic Boom into a music school called A&A Music Factory, where they help students pursue their musical dreams. They combine their talents to become business partners, and the store's success explodes. Later in the season, Jimmy Starr lifts Austin's performance ban and he officially makes a comeback performance.

The series has been described as a "pint-sized" version of HBO's comedy-drama Entourage.

== Episodes ==
Season	Episodes	Originally released	
Season	Episodes	First released	Last released
1	19	December 2, 2011	September 9, 2012
2	26	October 7, 2012	September 29, 2013
3	22	October 27, 2013	November 23, 2014
4	20	January 18, 2015	January 10, 2016

=== Jessie crossover ===
In November 2012, Disney Channel announced that the series would crossover with Jessie as an hour-long special episode titled "Austin & Jessie & Ally All Star New Year". The special aired on December 7, 2012, in which Austin finally gets to perform in Times Square on New Year's Eve like he has always dreamed of, with help from Jessie and the Ross children. Later, Jessie and the children travel to Miami with the group. Jessie inadvertently steals lyrics that were written by Zuri and tries to get Austin to sing them with her. Meanwhile, Ravi is jealous to see that the family's pet lizard, Mrs. Kipling, may have a crush on Dez, though it turns out that Mrs. Kipling does not like Dez at all.

== Cast and characters ==
=== Main ===
The main characters, from left to right: Trish, Austin Moon, Ally Dawson, and Dez.

- Ross Lynch as Austin Moon, an outgoing, confident, and talented singer. After becoming an overnight Internet sensation by performing a song he overheard Ally singing, Ally tracks him down to confront him for theft, but they eventually become friends instead and decide to form a musical partnership. His partnership with Ally is initially built on the idea that "he rocks; she writes". Ally is a brilliant songwriter, but is too timid to perform her own music, while Austin loves to perform, but is unable to write songs for himself. Their radically different personalities tend to clash early on, though they find they're much more alike than they think as their friendship develops, leading to an on-again, off-again romance starting in the second season. In the third season, they begin to date again and are found in a healthy, secure relationship throughout the fourth season. Austin's best friend is Dez, who directs and films all of his music videos, and his manager is Trish. Austin gives music lessons and teaches students about being a performer at the A&A Music Factory in the fourth season. In the series finale, it is revealed that Austin is married to Ally and they have two children named Alex and Ava.
- Laura Marano as Ally Dawson, a smart girl and a singer-songwriter with severe stage fright and a quiet, shy personality. Ally's father ran a music store and that's where Ally learned to love music and write songs. She originally wrote for herself, but after Austin accidentally stole one of her songs and became an Internet sensation as a result, she and her best friend, Trish, track him down, and she eventually becomes his musical partner and songwriter. Her partnership with Austin is initially built on the idea that "she writes; he rocks". Ally is a brilliant songwriter, but is too timid to perform her own music, while Austin loves to perform, but is unable to write songs for himself. Their radically different personalities tend to clash early on, though they find they're much more alike than they think as their friendship develops, leading to an on-again, off-again romance starting in the second season. In the third season, they begin to date again and are found in a healthy, secure relationship throughout the fourth season. Ally works at her father's music store, Sonic Boom, until she manages to conquer her stage fright and begins her own career, at which point the store becomes the A&A Music Factory. She gives music lessons and teaches students about being a performer at the Music Factory in the fourth season. In the series finale, it is revealed that Ally is married to Austin and they have two children named Alex and Ava.
- Raini Rodriguez as Trish, Ally's best friend and Austin's manager. She is sarcastic, snarky, lazy, vindictive, has little patience, and has a bit of a temper, but cares very much for her friends. Her jobs change frequently due to her lack of effort and presence at work. She takes her job as Austin's manager, however, fairly seriously and she also became Ally's manager when her career takes off. She has a complicated love-hate relationship with Dez. She teaches students at the A&A Music Factory about being a celebrity manager in the fourth season.
- Calum Worthy as Dez, an aspiring director with an odd personality and an unusual fashion style. He films all of Austin's music videos and is Austin's best friend. He's considerably dense and lacks much logical understanding which tends to lead him and the group into messy situations. He has a complicated love-hate relationship with Trish. He teaches students at the A&A Music Factory about filming and directing music videos in the fourth season.

=== Recurring ===
- Cole Sand as Nelson, an awkward young boy who takes music lessons from Ally. He constantly uses the phrase, "Aww, nartz!" and tends to mix up words that sound alike, such as "oboe" and "hobo".
- Andy Milder as Lester Dawson, Ally's cheapskate father who owns the music store Sonic Boom. He is completely ignorant of Ally's musical talents and believes that Ally has a billion-to-one shot at making it in the music business, just like Austin's parents have told him. He and Penny, Ally's mother, are divorced.
- Richard Whiten as Jimmy Starr, the owner of Starr Records who signs Austin to his record label.
- Aubrey Miller as Megan Simms, a 10-year-old reporter and photographer for Cheetah Beat Magazine. Megan is eccentric and constantly uses teenage slang terms such as "totes" or "hilar". She is stubborn and nosy as well, as she is bent on getting the stories she's after for the magazine.
- John Henson as Mike Moon, Austin's father, who co-owns the mattress store Moon's Mattress Kingdom.
- Jill Benjamin as Mimi Moon, Austin's mother, who used to be a hand model before co-owning Moon's Mattress Kingdom.
- Kiersey Clemons as Kira Starr, Jimmy Starr's daughter and Austin's ex-girlfriend. Kira temporarily had a case of repugnant breath, causing the group to be extremely wary of her throughout "Ferris Wheels & Funky Breath". Her bad breath was caused by her constant eating of garlic and anchovy pizza. Her bad breath cleared away afterward.
- John Paul Green as Chuck, a short, country-speaking teenager who believes he is better than Dez at everything. Their rivalry follows a long history of their families feuding, so Chuck and Dez often get into similar battles. He usually wears cowboy attire.
- Ashley Fink as Mindy, the manager of The Melody Diner and has a crush on Dez. Dez himself has no interest in her and is more intimidated by her than anything, as Mindy is overbearing and aggressive.
- Joe Rowley as Ronnie Ramone, the owner of Ramone Records, who signs Ally to his record label.
- Hannah Kat Jones as Carrie, a waitress at Shredder's Beach Club, Piper's sister, and Dez's girlfriend. She broke up with him in Los Angeles, but they got back together in "Wedding Bells & Wacky Birds".
- Hayley Erin as Piper, Carrie's sister and Austin's ex-girlfriend.
- Cameron Deane Stewart as Jace, a boy who Trish met when she was on tour and Trish's long-distance boyfriend.
- Cameron Jebo as Gavin Young, a country performer and Ally's ex-boyfriend.

== Production ==
The series was created by Kevin Kopelow and Heath Seifert, the writers and producers of the Nickelodeon comedy series All That and the Disney Channel sitcoms Sonny with a Chance and Jonas. Production for the pilot episode began in mid-February 2011, and on May 24, 2011, Disney Channel announced that Austin & Ally had been picked up as a series. They initially ordered 13 episodes, though that number was later increased to 21; however, only 19 aired. The first promo for the series was released in October 2011, during Disney Channel's Make Your Mark: The Ultimate Dance-Off event. The series officially premiered on December 2, 2011. The series was renewed for a second season and resumed production in summer 2012. The second season premiered on October 7, 2012. The series was renewed for a third season by Disney Channel on April 2, 2013. The third season premiered on October 27, 2013, and production ended on January 24, 2014. The series was renewed for a fourth season on April 25, 2014, which premiered on January 18, 2015. On February 6, 2015, Laura Marano stated that the fourth season would be the final season. The final episode aired on January 10, 2016.

=== Songs ===
List of albums, with selected chart positions
Title	Album details	Peak chart positions	
Title	Album details	US	US OST
Austin & Ally	Released: September 11, 2012; Formats: CD, LP, digital download; Label: Walt Disney	27	1
Austin & Ally: Turn It Up	Released: December 17, 2013; Formats: CD, digital download; Label: Walt Disney	89	6
Austin & Ally: Take It from the Top	Released: March 31, 2015; Formats: CD, digital download; Label: Walt Disney	—	—
"—" denotes releases that did not chart or were not released in that territory.

List of songs in Austin & Ally
Title	Performer	Premiere episode	Soundtrack
"Can't Do It without You" (Austin & Ally Main Title)	Ross Lynch	Rockers & Writers	Austin & Ally
"Double Take"	Ross Lynch	Rockers & Writers	Austin & Ally
"Break Down the Walls"	Ross Lynch	Rockers & Writers	Austin & Ally
"A Billion Hits"	Ross Lynch	Kangaroos & Chaos	Austin & Ally
"Not a Love Song"	Ross Lynch	Secrets & Songbooks	Austin & Ally
"It's Me, It's You"	Ross Lynch	Zaliens & Cloud Watchers	Austin & Ally
"The Butterfly Song"	Ross Lynch; Laura Marano; Lauren Boles	Bloggers & Butterflies	—N/a
"Trash Talka"	James Earl ft. Ross Lynch	Tickets & Trashbags	—N/a
"Better Together"	Ross Lynch	Managers & Meatballs	Austin & Ally
"You Don't See Me"	Laura Marano	Deejays & Demos	—N/a
"Heard It on the Radio"	Ross Lynch	Songwriting & Starfish	Austin & Ally
"Heart Beat"	Ross Lynch	Diners & Daters	Austin & Ally
"Na Na Na (The Summer Song)"	Ross Lynch	Everglades & Allygaters	Austin & Ally
"The Way That You Do"	Ross Lynch	Successes & Setbacks	Austin & Ally
"Illusion"	Ross Lynch	Albums & Auditions	Austin & Ally
"Don't Look Down"	Ross Lynch; Laura Marano	Costumes & Courage	Austin & Ally: Turn It Up
"Who I Am"	Ross Lynch	Magazines & Made-Up Stuff	Austin & Ally: Turn It Up
"Got It 2"	Ross Lynch; Trevor Jackson	Crybabies & Cologne	Austin & Ally: Turn It Up
"Christmas Soul"	Ross Lynch	Austin & Jessie & Ally All Star New Year	Disney Channel Holiday Playlist
"Can You Feel It"	Ross Lynch	Austin & Jessie & Ally All Star New Year	Can You Feel It? - Single
"Face to Face"	Ross Lynch; Debby Ryan	Austin & Jessie & Ally All Star New Year	Austin & Ally: Turn It Up
"No Ordinary Day"	Ross Lynch	Ferris Wheels & Funky Breath	—N/a
"You Can Come to Me"	Ross Lynch; Laura Marano	Chapters & Choices	Disney Channel Play It Loud
"I Think About You"	Ross Lynch	Partners & Parachutes	Austin & Ally: Turn It Up
"Finally Me"	Laura Marano	Tracks & Trouble	Austin & Ally: Turn It Up
"The Ally Way"	Laura Marano	Viral Videos & Very Bad Dancing	—N/a
"Steal Your Heart"	Ross Lynch	Tunes & Trials	Austin & Ally: Turn It Up
"Timeless"	Ross Lynch	Future Sounds & Festival Songs	Disney Channel Play It Loud
"Living in the Moment"	Ross Lynch	Sports & Sprains	—N/a
"I Got That Rock and Roll"	Ross Lynch	Beach Bums & Bling	Disney Channel Play It Loud
"The Me That You Don't See"	Laura Marano	Fresh Starts & Farewells	Disney Channel Play It Loud
"Better than This"	Ross Lynch	Fresh Starts & Farewells	Austin & Ally: Turn It Up
"Chasin' the Beat of My Heart"	Ross Lynch	Road Trips & Reunions	Austin & Ally: Turn It Up
"You Wish You Were Me"	Raini Rodriguez	What Ifs & Where's Austin	—N/a
"Redial"	Laura Marano	Beach Clubs & BFFs	Austin & Ally: Turn It Up
"I Love Christmas"	Ross Lynch; Laura Marano	Mix-Ups & Mistletoes	Disney Holidays Unwrapped
"Austin & Ally Glee Club Mash Up"	Austin & Ally cast	Glee Clubs & Glory	Disney Channel Play It Loud
"Who U R"	Ross Lynch	Austin & Alias	Austin & Ally: Turn It Up
"Upside Down"	Ross Lynch	Princesses & Prizes	Austin & Ally: Turn It Up
"Stuck on You"	Ross Lynch	Critics & Confidence	Austin & Ally: Turn It Up
"Me and You"	Laura Marano; Cameron Jebo	Hunks & Homecoming	Austin & Ally: Turn It Up
"What We're About"	Ross Lynch	Fanatics & Favors	Austin & Ally: Turn It Up
"Look Out"	Ross Lynch; Laura Marano	Eggs & Extraterrestrials	—N/a
"Superhero"	Ross Lynch	Beauties & Bullies	Austin & Ally: Turn It Up
"Parachute"	Laura Marano	Records & Wrecking Balls	Austin & Ally: Turn It Up
"Can't Do It without You" (Austin & Ally Main Title)	Ross Lynch; Laura Marano	Buzzcuts & Beginnings	Austin & Ally: Take It from the Top
"No Place Like Home"	Laura Marano	Buzzcuts & Beginnings	Austin & Ally: Take It from the Top
"Play My Song"	Laura Marano	Mini-Me's & Muffin Baskets	Austin & Ally: Take It from the Top
"Dance Like Nobody's Watching"	Laura Marano	Dancers & Ditzes	Austin & Ally: Take It from the Top
"Take It from the Top"	Ross Lynch	Comebacks & Crystal Balls	Austin & Ally: Take It from the Top
"Jump Back, Kiss Yourself"	Ross Lynch	Cap and Gown & Can't Be Found	—N/a
"Perfect Christmas"	Ross Lynch; Laura Marano	Santas & Surprises	—N/a
"You've Got a Friend"	Raini Rodriguez ft. Austin & Ally cast	Musicals & Moving On	—N/a
"Two in a Million"	Ross Lynch; Laura Marano	Duets & Destiny	—N/a

== Broadcast ==
The series aired worldwide on Disney Channel. It aired as a preview in Canada alongside the original broadcast and premiered on January 20, 2012. It premiered in Singapore on March 3, 2012, and in Australia and New Zealand on March 23, 2012. In India, the series premiered on Disney Channel on December 1, 2013, and on October 30, 2017, on Disney International HD. In the UK and Ireland the series aired a preview on March 30, 2012, and premiered on April 20, 2012. The series premiered on Disney Channel in Canada on September 1, 2015, with Raini Rodriguez and Calum Worthy introducing the series with special contests and events.

== Reception ==
=== Ratings ===
Viewership and ratings per season of Austin & Ally
Season	Episodes	First aired		Last aired		Avg. viewers (millions)
Season	Episodes	Date	Viewers (millions)	Date	Viewers (millions)	Avg. viewers (millions)
1	19	December 2, 2011	5.66	September 9, 2012	2.95	3.25
2	26	October 7, 2012	4.02	September 29, 2013	3.27	3.50
3	21^{[A]}	October 27, 2013	3.28	November 23, 2014	2.90	2.60
4	20	January 18, 2015	3.08	January 10, 2016	3.20	2.13

^{A} Not all episodes have been counted toward the viewership average; the viewership data for the episode "Last Dances & Last Chances" was unavailable. See the list of episodes page for more.

=== Awards and nominations ===
Year	Award	Category	Result
2013	Kids' Choice Awards Argentina	Best International TV Show	Nominated
2014	Teen Choice Awards	Choice TV Show: Comedy	Nominated
2014	Kids' Choice Awards Mexico	International Program	Nominated
2015	Nickelodeon Kids' Choice Awards	Favorite TV Show	Won
2015	Teen Choice Awards	Choice TV Show: Comedy	Nominated
2015	Kids' Choice Awards Mexico	International Program	Won
2015	Kids' Choice Awards Colombia	International Program	Won
2015	Meus Prêmios Nick	Favorite TV Show	Won
2015	Kids' Choice Awards Argentina	International Program	Won
2016	Kids' Choice Awards	Favorite TV Show – Kids Show	Nominated
2016	Teen Choice Awards	Choice TV Show: Comedy	Nominated
