= Borealis (band) =

Canadian power metal band

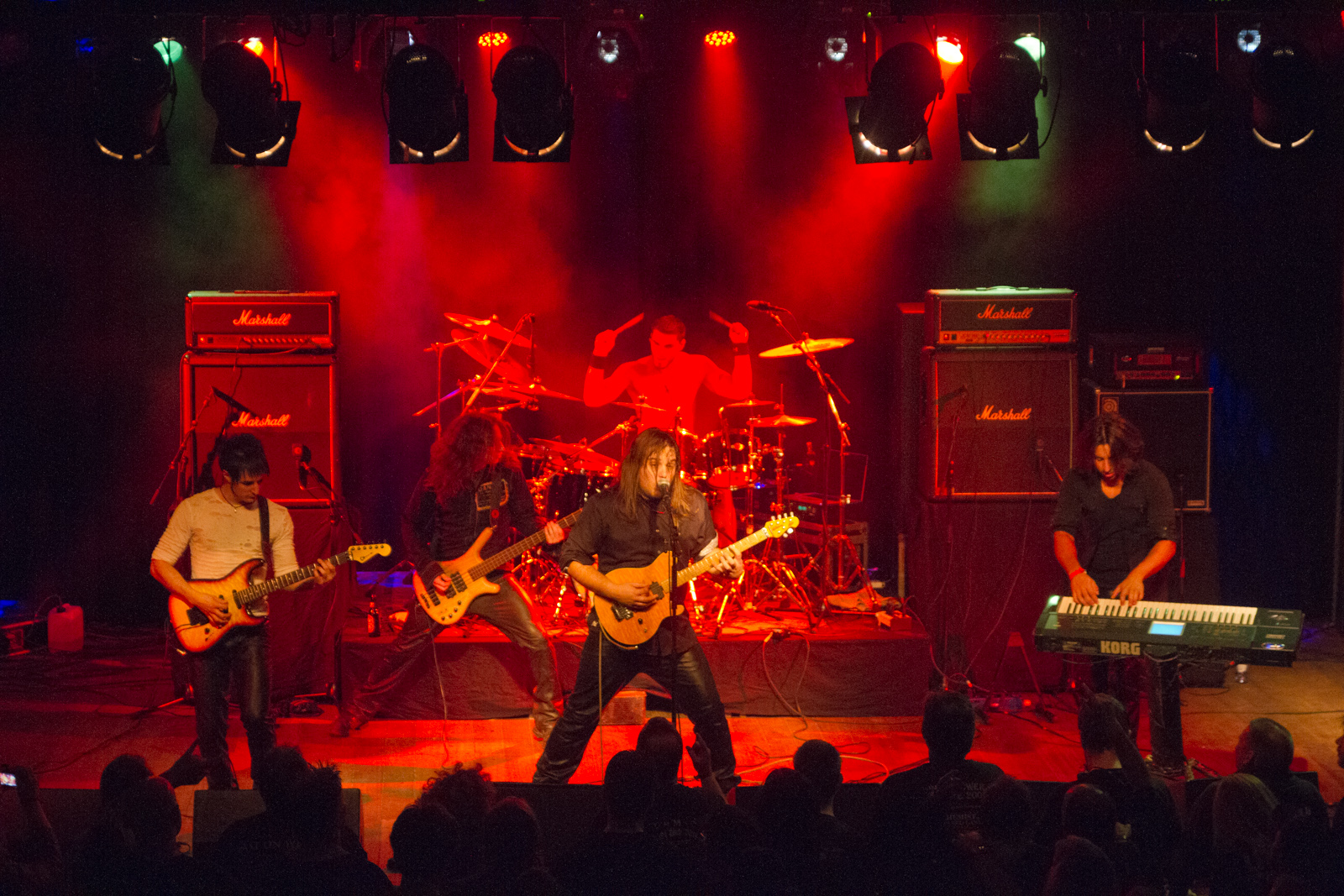
- Borealis in 2011

Background information
- Origin: Orangeville, Ontario, Canada
- Genres: Power metal, progressive metal
- Years active: 2005−present
- Labels: AFM Records (current); Lion Music; Hydrant Music
- Members: Ken Fobert; Sean Dowell; Aiden Watkinson; Matt Marinelli
- Past members: Jamie Smith; Michael Briguglio; Siobhan O'Brian; Sean Werlick; Trevor McBride

Borealis is a Canadian power/progressive metal band from Orangeville, Ontario. Their first album was recorded in light of a well received opening performance for Sonata Arctica.

When the band began in 2005, they originally employed a female opera style vocalist Siobhan O'Brian as their lead vocalist. In 2006, they recorded a demo Eyes of a Dream. Siobhan left the band between 2006 and 2007. Matt Marinelli became vocalist in September 2007, and 2008 marked the year Borealis released their first full-length album, World of Silence. In order to play this album live, they needed another guitarist, thus hiring Ken Fobert. In 2011, they recorded their second album, Fall from Grace, including Ken Fobert as a member of the band. Michael Briguglio replaced Ken between 2011-2013 and is a current guitarist for the band. They were signed by AFM Records in 2015 and released their third album, Purgatory.

== History ==
=== Formation, demo (2005–2006) ===
Borealis featured a female vocalist in their initial years, geared more towards a symphonic metal sound. With this lineup they recorded their first demo Eyes of a Dream. In September 2006, they opened for power metal bands Kamelot and Epica. The crowd's response was very positive; the band's promoter claimed it was "the best reaction to an opener he had ever heard". The band did not like this setup though, claiming it to be limiting to the style of music they wished to produce. Before September 2007, they parted ways with Siobhan O'Brian. The band subsequently opened for Sonata Arctica with Matt Marinelli in Siobhan's stead. After this performance, Matt became the lead singer for the band.

=== World of Silence (2008–2011) ===
2008 marked the year Borealis released their first full-length album, World of Silence. They were not signed to a label at this point, and the album was self-released. It was recorded in The Recording House studio, courtesy of Sean Gregory of Emerald Rain. Gregory helped Borealis achieve the type of sound they wanted, and the album exceeded their expectations. In order to play this album live while staying faithful to the rhythm and lead guitar tracks, Borealis needed an additional guitarist. They looked towards a friend, Ken Fobert, to join them on their tour. After a jam session with Fobert, they confirmed his sound suited the band and hired him.

=== Fall from Grace (2011–2014) ===
After many shows, including shows where they opened for other famous acts like Edguy, they recorded a second album released internationally under Lion Music. Released in 2011, Fall from Grace featured a harder-edged sound in comparison to their first album. The album was released in Japan as well, aided by Japanese label Hydrant Music. The album was once again positively received. One review attributed that the band had adopted a "mature" song writing style that typically did not come so quickly to new bands.

=== Purgatory (2015–2017) ===
Since the release of Fall from Grace, the band went on a semi-hiatus. During this period they toured with Saxon, and played some venues in Europe. In 2013, Borealis released a teaser video promoting a new album they planned to release in 2014. In March 2014, on their Facebook page, they indicated they were tracking for the new album. Then, in January 2015, they announced that their album was largely complete, and released portions of finished tracks.

On May 7, 2015, AFM Records announced they had signed Borealis, and their new album, Purgatory was revealed. The release date was set for June 19, 2015, for Europe and July 21, 2015, for North America respectively.

Regarding Purgatory, Matt Marinelli said:

This was a long journey...one thing we did different compared to the other albums was that we did everything in the studio. Because our drummer Sean Dowell did all the engineering...we could take a lot more time to do it. Life kind of got in the way, when our drummer was in school, we couldn't really do much at all...that's why we were on such a long hiatus. We're already writing for the next album...we don't want to do that to the fans anymore.

Purgatory is a serious concept album, with darker themes than their previous works.

On August 12, 2016, the band announced that a founding member and the band's bassist Jamie Smith would be leaving Borealis and moving across Canada with his family. However, Jamie indicated that the band had a replacement who had been friends with members of the band for years. He also cited that the band was well into recording their next album.

=== The Offering (2018–present) ===
After a successful tour with Evergrey, Oceans of Slumber and Voyager during their previous album cycle, the band went back to the drawing board to come up with a new concept for the next album. After Purgatory's largely positive reception, they decided once again to continue with another concept album. Inspired by Matt Marinelli's love for horror movies, the band created an album centred around the concept of a cult that sacrifices children in the name of their deity.

Matt Marinelli explains the inspiration behind the concept in an interview with CROM Magazine:

I think with the story, the whole thing kind of started when I watched this indie horror movie called "The Devil's Hand" and after I watched it, I thought it was an interesting idea. So we took that idea of the cult and of the children sacrificed and we put like a fictional twist on it [...] It's nothing that we would ever want to actually happen, but we find in the story telling point of view, it really has a lot stronger impact."

The Offering has also come with some new beginnings. After taking some time to regroup after the departure of founding bass player Jamie Smith, the band welcomed the return of rhythm guitarist Ken Fobert, as well as their new bass player Trevor McBride. This is the second record produced by band's drummer and orchestrator Sean Dowell.

The album was released with AFM Records on March 23, 2018.

In March 2019, Sean Werlick announced, on the band's Facebook page, that he had left the band. In May 2021, on the band's Facebook page, keyboardist Vikram Shankar revealed that he was working with Borealis on a new album.

The album, Illusions, was released on October 7, 2022.

== Style and influences ==
Borealis - Regeneration
A clip from a track on Fall From Grace illustrates Borealis' style of play.

In an interview, the band explained the origin of their name: "we were all hanging out one night and the northern lights (Aurora Borealis) could be seen above. We thought it would be a cool name, but with Aurora Borealis already being a successful band, we shortened it to Borealis".

Borealis cites in interviews that when they formed they initially wished to emulate bands such as Nightwish or Sonata Arctica. They have modified their sound a bit since their debut, claiming to be influenced by bands such as Symphony X and Stratovarius when playing as openers for these famous acts. In an interview an anonymous Borealis member stated:

From the usual suspects like Symphony X, Evergrey, and Avantasia, to more obscure inspirations like Hans Zimmer's movie scores and Lady Gaga's top 40 hits, we all like it and try to blend it all in our writing.

Borealis' style consists of a rhythm guitar with a heavy bass end, double bass drums, baritone clean vocals similar to Russell Allen of Symphony X, and keys to expand options for their sound. Occasional virtuosic guitar riffs complement the rhythm, as well as guitar solos for both guitarists, and occasional keyboard solos. Matt Marinelli was asked which three albums of any band had changed his life, to which he listed Mercy Falls by Seventh Wonder, The Inner Circle by Evergrey, and Century Child by Nightwish.

== Band members ==
Current

- Matt Marinelli – guitars (2005–present), lead vocals (2007–present)
- Sean Dowell – drums (2005−present)
- Ken Fobert – guitars (2008–2011, 2017–present)
- Aiden Watkinson – bass (2022−present)

Former

- Siobhan O'Brian – lead vocals (2005–2007)
- Jamie Smith – bass (2005−2016)
- Michael Briguglio – guitars (2011–2016)
- Sean Werlick – keyboards (2005–2019)
- Trevor McBride – bass (2016−2020)

Timeline

== Discography ==
Demos

- Eyes of a Dream (2006)

Studio albums

- World of Silence (2008, re-recorded in 2017)
- Fall from Grace (2011)
- Purgatory (2015)
- The Offering (2018)
- Illusions (2022)
