= Fall from Grace (Borealis album) =

Studio album by Borealis
- Released: May 20, 2011
- Recorded: 2010 at Sundown Studio, Ontario, Canada
- Genres: Power metal, progressive metal
- Length: 43:31
- Label: Lion Music/Hydrant Music
- Producer: Borealis

Borealis chronology
World of Silence (2008)	Fall from Grace (2011)	Purgatory (2015)

Professional ratings
Review scores
Source	Rating
SeaofTranquility	4/5 stars
HardrockHaven	4.25/5
AngryMetalGuy	3.5/5 stars

Fall from Grace is the second studio album by the Canadian power metal/progressive metal band by Borealis. It was released in 2011 by Lion Music in North America and by Hydrant Music in Japan.

== Track listing ==
All tracks are written by Borealis.

No.	Title	Length
1.	"Finest Hour"	4:02
2.	"Words I Failed to Say"	5:14
3.	"Fall from Grace"	5:39
4.	"Where We Started"	5:18
5.	"Breaking the Curse"	4:54
6.	"Regeneration"	5:45
7.	"Watch the World Collapse"	4:04
8.	"Take You Over"	3:22
9.	"Forgotten Forever"	5:13
Total length:		43:31

Japanese edition bonus tracks
No.	Title	Length
10.	"From the Fading Screams"	5:26
11.	"The Afterlife"	6:20
Total length:		11:46

== Personnel ==
- Matt Marinelli – vocals, guitars
- Sean Werlick – keyboards
- Jamie Smith – bass
- Sean Dowell – drums
- Ken Fobert – guitars

=== Production ===
- Jordan Valeriote – recording, mixing
- Thomas "PLEC" Johansson – mastering
