= The Offering (Borealis album) =

Studio album by Borealis
- Released: March 23, 2018
- Recorded: 2016–2017
- Studio: Sanctuary Studios
- Genre: Progressive power metal
- Length: 61:20
- Label: AFM Records
- Producer: Sean Dowell

Borealis chronology
Purgatory (2015)	The Offering (2018)	Illusions (2022)

Professional ratings
Review scores
Source	Rating
Dangerdog	4/5
Dead Rhetoric	9/10
Metal Temple	7/10

The Offering is the fourth studio album by Canadian progressive power metal band by Borealis. It was released on March 23, 2018. It is a concept album inspired by horror films. A lyric video was released for the song "River".

== Track listing ==
All tracks are written by Sean Dowell, Sean Werlick, Matt Marinelli.

No.	Title	Length
1.	"The Fire Between Us"	4:41
2.	"Sign of No Return"	5:05
3.	"The Offering"	5:08
4.	"River"	4:44
5.	"The Second Son"	5:34
6.	"The Devil's Hand"	3:58
7.	"Into the Light"	5:24
8.	"Scarlet Angel"	5:24
9.	"The Awakening"	5:07
10.	"The Path"	2:18
11.	"Forever Lost"	5:07
12.	"The Ghosts of Innocence"	8:50
Total length:		61:20

== Personnel ==
- Matt Marinelli – vocals, guitars
- Ken Fobert – guitars
- Sean Werlick – keyboards
- Trevor McBride – bass
- Sean Dowell – drums

=== Guest musicians ===
- Sarah Dee – female vocals (tracks 8 and 12)

=== Technical staff ===
- Sean Dowell – production, mixing, mastering
- Stan Decker – artwork, layout
- Dave Gillespie – photography
