= Teen Choice Award for Choice Comedy Series =

Entertainment award category

The following is a list of Teen Choice Award winners and nominees for Choice TV – Comedy. Friends has the most wins with six.

== Winners and nominees ==
=== 1999 ===
Year	Winners	Nominees	Ref.
1999	Friends	3rd Rock from the Sun; Dharma & Greg; Home Improvement; Moesha; Sabrina, the Teenage Witch; South Park; That '70s Show; Two Guys and a Girl	

=== 2000s ===
In 2006, it was awarded as Choice TV Comedy/Musical (to include a TV movie into the category).

Year	Winners	Nominees	Ref.
2000	Friends	Just Shoot Me!; Malcolm in the Middle; Popular; The Simpsons; That '70s Show; The Tom Green Show; Will & Grace	
2001	Friends	Grounded for Life; Malcolm in the Middle; My Wife and Kids; Popular; The Simpsons; That '70s Show; Will & Grace	
2002	Friends	The Bernie Mac Show; Greg the Bunny; Malcolm in the Middle; Scrubs; The Simpsons; That '70s Show; Will & Grace	
2003	Friends	8 Simple Rules; The Bernie Mac Show; Gilmore Girls; Lizzie McGuire; Malcolm in the Middle; Scrubs; That '70s Show	
2004	Friends	The Bernie Mac Show; Gilmore Girls; Malcolm in the Middle; Scrubs; The Simpsons; That '70s Show; That's So Raven	
2005	Gilmore Girls	Desperate Housewives; Family Guy; Scrubs; The Simpsons; That '70s Show; That's So Raven; What I Like About You	
2006	High School Musical	Desperate Housewives; Everybody Hates Chris; Gilmore Girls; My Name Is Earl; The War at Home	
2007	Hannah Montana	Desperate Housewives; Entourage; The Office; Ugly Betty	
2008	Hannah Montana	Desperate Housewives; How I Met Your Mother; Two and a Half Men; Ugly Betty	
2009	Hannah Montana	How I Met Your Mother; iCarly; The Office; Ugly Betty	

=== 2010s ===
Year	Winners	Nominees	Ref.
2010	Glee	The Big Bang Theory; Modern Family; Sonny with a Chance; Wizards of Waverly Place	
2011	Glee	The Big Bang Theory; iCarly; Modern Family; Wizards of Waverly Place	
2012	Glee	2 Broke Girls; The Big Bang Theory; Modern Family; New Girl	
2013	Glee	The Big Bang Theory; Modern Family; New Girl; Suburgatory	
2014	The Big Bang Theory	Austin & Ally; Glee; New Girl; Sam & Cat	
2015	The Big Bang Theory	Austin & Ally; Awkward; Girl Meets World; New Girl; Young & Hungry	
2016	Fuller House	Austin & Ally; Jane the Virgin; Liv and Maddie; Modern Family; Scream Queens	
2017	Fuller House	Baby Daddy; Brooklyn Nine-Nine; Jane the Virgin; One Day at a Time; Young & Hungry	
2018	The Big Bang Theory	Black-ish; Fuller House; The Good Place; Jane the Virgin; Modern Family	
2019	The Big Bang Theory	Black-ish; Brooklyn Nine-Nine; Fuller House; Jane the Virgin; One Day at a Time	
