= Purgatory (Borealis album) =

Studio album by Borealis
- Released: June 19, 2015
- Recorded: 2012–2015
- Genres: Power metal, progressive metal
- Length: 52:20
- Label: AFM Records
- Producer: Borealis

Borealis chronology
Fall from Grace (2011)	Purgatory (2015)	The Offering (2018)

Professional ratings
Review scores
Source	Rating
AngryMetalGuy	3.5/5 stars
Dangerdog	4/5 stars
Metal Temple	4.5/5 stars

Purgatory is the third studio album by the Canadian power metal/progressive metal band by Borealis. It was released in Europe on June 19, 2015, and in North America on July 24 by AFM Records.

== Track listing ==
All tracks are written by Borealis.

No.	Title	Length
1.	"Past the Veil"	5:15
2.	"From the Ashes"	4:41
3.	"The Chosen One"	4:18
4.	"Destiny"	4:25
5.	"Darkest Sin"	3:20
6.	"My Peace"	4:39
7.	"Place of Darkness"	4:07
8.	"Welcome to Eternity"	4:42
9.	"Sacrifice"	4:32
10.	"Rest My Child"	4:31
11.	"Purgatory"	4:00
12.	"Revelation"	3:50
Total length:		52:20

== Personnel ==
- Matt Marinelli – vocals, guitars
- Sean Werlick – keyboards
- Jamie Smith – bass guitar
- Sean Dowell – drums, recording, mixing
- Michael Briguglio – guitars

=== Session musicians ===
- Gina Mancini – backing vocals (track 3)
- Sarah Dee – female vocals (track 2)
- Sierra Fortune Harron – note (track 6)

=== Technical staff ===
- Thomas "PLEC" Johansson – mastering
- Stan Decker – artwork, layout
- Erica Scobie – photography
