= Illusionism =

Illusionism may refer to:

- Illusionism (art), a painting technique in which the artwork appears to share the same space as the viewer or otherwise mimics physical elements
- Illusionism (free will), a metaphysical theory about free will
- Illusionism (philosophy of mind), a theory of consciousness

== See also ==
- Magic (illusion), an art performed by an illusionist
- Illusion (disambiguation)
