= Grand Illusion =

Grand Illusion may refer to:

== Music ==
- Grand Illusion (album), by Nocturnal Rites, 2005
- The Grand Illusion, a 1977 album by Styx, and its title song
- "Grand Illusion", a song from the 2016 album In the Now by Barry Gibb
- "Grand Illusion", a song from the 1980 album The Wanderer by Donna Summer
- "Grand Illusion", a song from the 1986 album August by Eric Clapton

== Other uses ==
- Grand Illusion, in neuroscience, cognitive science, and philosophy of mind, a description of the binding problem
- Grand Illusion, the world's first-ever 8a (5.13b) graded rock climb by Tony Yaniro
- La Grande Illusion ('The Grand Illusion'), a 1937 French film by Jean Renoir
- Grand Illusion Cinema, an independent movie theater in Seattle, U.S.
- Grand Illusions, a YouTube channel by Tim Rowett
- Suuri illusioni ('Grand illusion'), a 1928 novel by Mika Waltari, and the basis for the 1985 film Grand Illusion directed by Tuija-Maija Niskanen
- Grand Illusion, the 1991 autobiography of Jakub Egit
- The Grand Illusion, a myth of Olidammara in Dungeons & Dragons
- The Grand Illusion, a 1953 novel by John Russell Fearn writing as Vargo Statten

== See also ==
- The Great Illusion, a book by Norman Angell, first published in 1909
