= Illusions (Borealis album) =

Studio album by Borealis
- Released: October 7, 2022
- Recorded: 2020–2021
- Studio: Sanctuary Studios
- Genre: Progressive power metal
- Length: 62:22
- Label: AFM Records
- Producer: Sean Dowell

Borealis chronology
The Offering (2018)	Illusions (2022)

Singles from Illusions
- 1. "Pray for Water" Released: August 19, 2022; 2. "Ashes Turn to Rain" Released: September 27, 2022

Professional ratings
Review scores
Source	Rating
Dangerdog	4/5
Dead Rhetoric	9/10
Metal Temple	10/10

Illusions is the fifth studio album by Canadian progressive power metal band by Borealis. It was released on October 7, 2022. It continues the lyrical concept of their previous album The Offering. A lyric video was released for the song "Pray for Water".

== Track listing ==
No.	Title	Length
1.	"Illusions"	1:22
2.	"Ashes Turn to Rain"	4:54
3.	"My Fortress"	7:08
4.	"Pray for Water"	5:26
5.	"Burning Tears"	4:20
6.	"Believer"	5:32
7.	"Light of the Sun"	6:24
8.	"Face of Reality"	5:47
9.	"Bury Me Alive"	5:07
10.	"Abandon All Hope"	5:07
11.	"The Phantom Silence"	11:15
Total length:		62:22

== Personnel ==
- Matt Marinelli – vocals, guitars
- Ken Fobert – guitars, bass
- Vikram Shankar – keyboards
- Sean Dowell – drums

=== Guest musicians ===
- Sarah Dee – female vocals
- Christine Hals – female vocals (track 1)
- Lynsey Ward – female vocals (tracks 5)

=== Technical staff ===
- Sean Dowell – production, mixing
- Thomas "Plec" Johansson – mastering
- Giannis Nakos (Remedy Art Design) – artwork, layout
