= Ilusión =

Ilusión (plural: ilusiones) may refer to:

- Ilusiones, Venezuelan telenovela 1995
- Ilusiones (es), Argentina telenovela 2000 Oscar Martínez (actor)
- Ilusión (Edurne album), 2007
- Ilusión (Fonseca album), 2011
  - Ilusión World Tour
- "Ilusión", Julieta Venegas MTV Unplugged (Julieta Venegas album)

== See also ==
- Ilusión Nacional
- Dulce Ilusión
- Calle Ilusión
- Pampa Ilusión
