= Illusion (keelboat) =

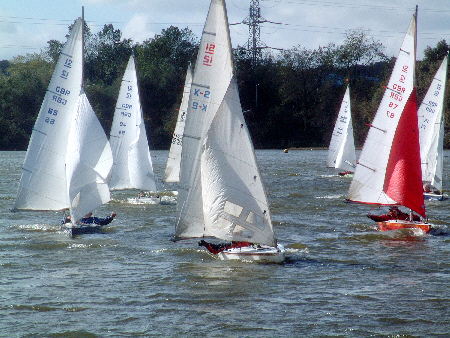
- Illusion

Development
- Design: one-design
- Name: Illusion

Boat
- Crew: 1
- Draft: 0.69 m (2 ft 3 in)

Hull
- Type: Monohull
- Construction: GRP
- Hull weight: 220 kg (490 lb)
- LOA: 3.7 m (12 ft)
- LWL: 3.23 m (10.6 ft)
- Beam: 0.85 m (2 ft 9 in)

Hull appendages
- Keel: Fixed

Sails
- Spinnaker area: 4.5 m^{2} (48 sq ft)
- Upwind sail area: 3.4 m^{2} (37 sq ft)

Racing
- RYA PN: 1365 (temporary)

The Illusion is a one-design, single-handed keelboat based on the lines of a 12-metre yacht. Its features include foot pedal steering, genoa roller reefing, full trimming facilities and large buoyancy tanks. It was designed by Jo Richards and Neil Graham in 1981.

== UK clubs ==
Clubs racing Illusions in the UK are:

- Broxbourne SC, Broxbourne (Herts)
- Bembridge SC (IoW)
- Middle Nene SC, Thrapston (Northants.)
- West Kirby SC, Wirral (Merseyside)

== See also ==
- 2.4 Metre (keelboat)
- Deception Mini 12 (keelboat)
