= Raini Rodriguez =

American actress (born 1993)

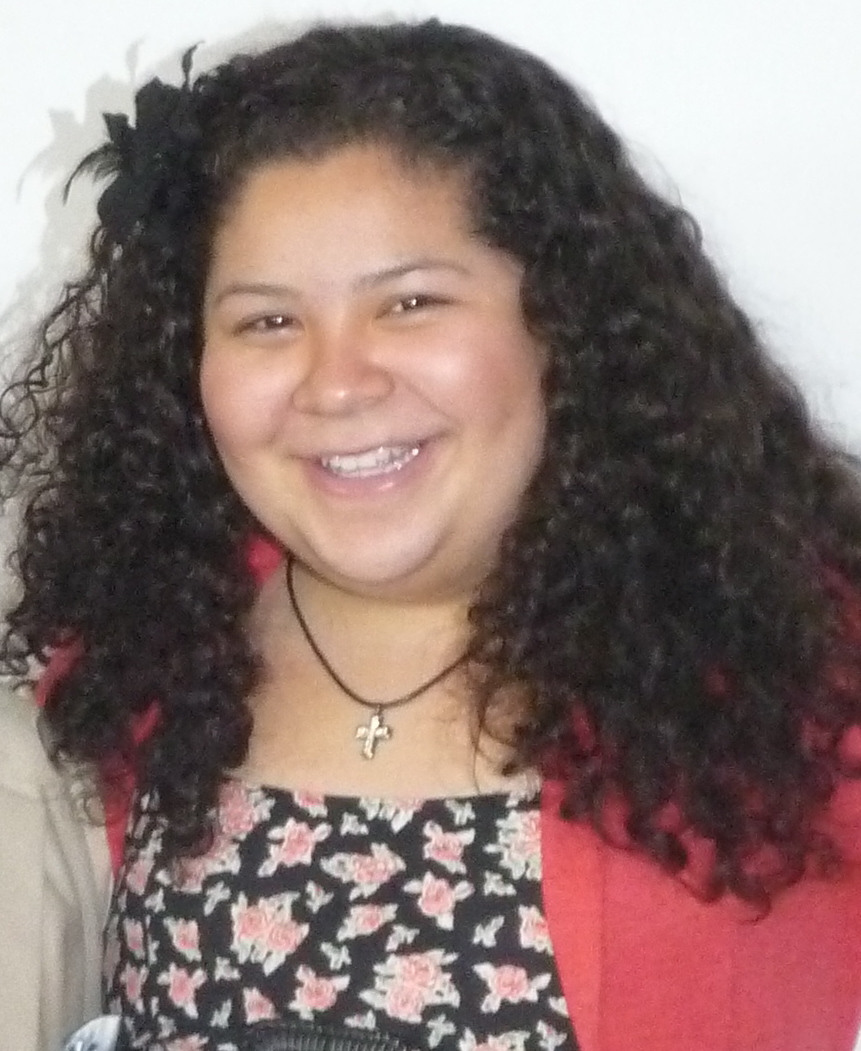
- Rodriguez in 2010
- Born: Raini-Alena Rodriguez; July 1, 1993 (age 33); Bryan, Texas, U.S.
- Occupations: Actress; singer
- Years active: 2006–present
- Relatives: Rico Rodriguez (brother)

Raini-Alena Rodriguez (born July 1, 1993) is an American actress and singer. She is known for her roles as Trish in the Disney Channel original series Austin & Ally, Maya Blart in Paul Blart: Mall Cop (2009) and Paul Blart: Mall Cop 2 (2015), and Tess in Prom (2011). She won Best Young Television Actress at the 2013 Imagen Awards.

== Early and personal life ==
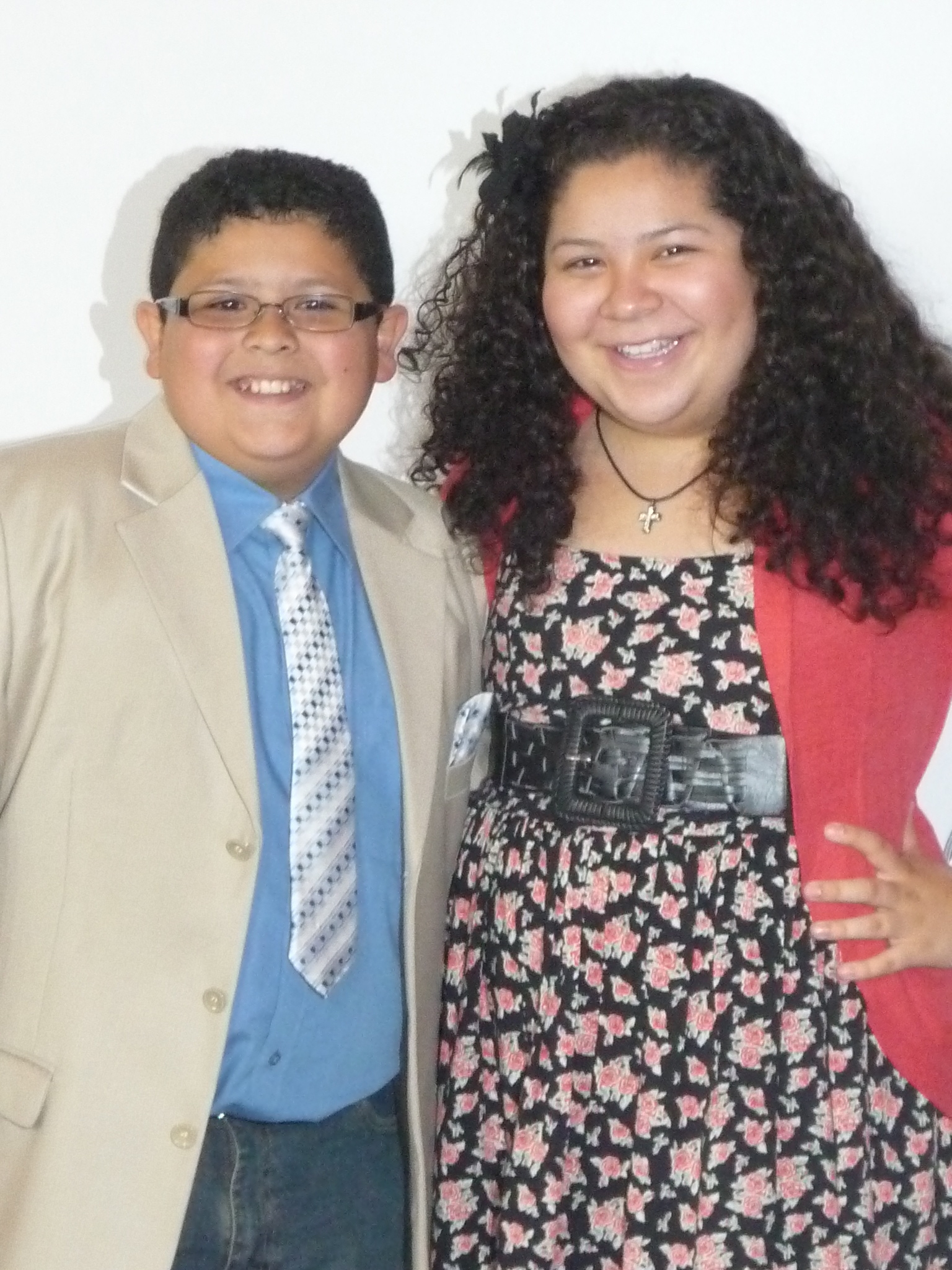
Rodriguez with her brother, Rico, in 2010

Rodriguez was born in Bryan, Texas. She is the older sister of actor Rico Rodriguez. She has two other brothers, Ray and Roy Jr. Her parents, Diane and Roy Rodriguez, own a business called Rodriguez Tire Service. She is of Mexican descent.

Raini was discovered at an IMTA showcase, by Susan Osser, a California talent agent. After viewing Raini's performance, Osser suggested to Raini's mother that Osser should become Raini's manager and come to California to give Raini a year for career opportunities. At the time, Raini was 11 years old. Her mother agreed. Raini and her brother Rico moved to Los Angeles with their mother, while their father stayed in Texas to run the tire shop. Their mother home-schooled them to support their careers.

On March 12, 2017, Rodriguez's father, Roy, died at age 52.

In March 2018, several memes involving Rodriguez went viral on multiple social media platforms where trolls would sarcastically label her as a "skinny legend" and compare her music discography, most notably her 2012 song "Living Your Dreams", to several uplifted and acclaimed acts in the industry, such as Beyoncé, Mariah Carey, and Whitney Houston. Rodriguez was subsequently asked about her opinions on the memes on her Twitter account 3 months later; she condemned the memes and labeled them as a form of online bullying, stating that she chooses to embrace positive attention instead. Despite Rodriguez's comments, the same people have continued to sarcastically praise her and continue to call her a "skinny legend". This has resulted in Rodriguez having to block multiple users on her social media platforms.

== Filmography ==
=== Film ===
Year	Title	Role	Notes
2007	Parker	Kid on Playground #2	
2008	Babysitters Beware	Marco's Sister #1	
2009	Paul Blart: Mall Cop	Maya Blart	
2009	Slice of Water	Maggie Blumsfeld	
2009	Gordita	Teenage Tatiana	
2011	Prom	Tess Torres	
2011	Last Chance Lloyd	Tess Torres	Short film
2012	Girl in Progress	Tavita	
2014	When Marnie Was There	Nobuko Kadoya (English voice)	
2015	Paul Blart: Mall Cop 2	Maya Blart	
2015	Bob's Broken Sleigh	Wupsy	Voice

=== Television ===
Year	Title	Role	Notes
2006	Huff	Denise	Episode: "Black Shadows"
2007	Handy Manny	Isabel Montoya (voice)	Episode:"Lost and Found"
2007	Family of the Year	Maria	Episode: "Pilot"
2007	The Suite Life of Zack & Cody	Betsy	Episode: "Sleepover Suite"
2010	I'm in the Band	Arlene Roca	2 episodes
2011–16	Austin & Ally	Trish De la Rosa	Main Role (87 episodes); director: "Rejection & Rocketships"
2011	True Jackson, VP	Nina	Episode: "True Mall"
2011	The Tonight Show with Jay Leno	Herself	(Season 20, episode 46)
2015	Growing Up and Down	Jackie	Unaired TV pilot
2015	I Didn't Do It	Trish De la Rosa	Episode: "Bite Club"
2016	Mutt & Stuff	Gabby Groomer	Episode: "Skate Doggin'"
2017	Vampirina	Creepy Caroline (voice)	Episode: "The Ghoul Girls"
2018–19	The Lion Guard	Starehe (voice)	2 episodes
2018	Double Dare	Herself	Contestant; episode: "Team Rico vs. Team Raini"
2019	Knight Squad	The Witch Doctor	Episode: "The Knight Stuff"
2019	Where's Waldo	Maria (voice)	Episode: "A New York Minute"
2019–23	Bunk'd	Barb Barca	Recurring role, 8 episodes
2020	The Substitute	Herself	Episode: "Rico & Raini Rodriguez"
2020–22	Jurassic World Camp Cretaceous	Sammy Gutierrez (voice)	Main role
2021	A Tale Dark & Grimm	Gretel (voice)	Main role
2021–23	Rugrats	Gabi (voice)	5 episodes
2024–25	Jurassic World: Chaos Theory	Sammy Gutierrez (voice)	Main role

== Discography ==
=== Singles ===
==== As lead artist ====
Title	Year	Album
"Living Your Dreams"	2012	Beverly Hills Chihuahua 3: Viva La Fiesta!

==== As featured artist ====
Title	Year	Album
"Austin & Ally Glee Club Mash Up" (with Austin & Ally cast)	2013	Disney Channel Play It Loud

=== Promotional singles ===
Title	Year	Album
"Vive Tus Sueños" ("Living Your Dreams")	2012	Beverly Hills Chihuahua 3: Viva La Fiesta!
"Double Take"	2013	Austin & Ally
"You Wish You Were Me"	2013	Non-album single
"Row, Row, Row Your Boat"	2014	Austin & Ally

== Videography ==
Year	Title	Director
2012	"Living Your Dreams"	Unknown

== Awards and nominations ==
Year	Association	Category	Work	Result
2010	Young Artist Awards	Best Performance in a Feature Film – Supporting Young Actress	Paul Blart: Mall Cop	Nominated
2013	Imagen Awards	Best Young Actress/Television	Austin & Ally	Won
2015	Teen Choice Awards	Choice Movie Actress: Comedy	Paul Blart: Mall Cop 2	Nominated
2015	Imagen Awards	Best Supporting Actress – Television	Austin & Ally	Nominated
