= Austin & Ally (soundtrack) =

Soundtrack album by Ross Lynch
- Released: September 11, 2012
- Recorded: 2011–2012
- Genres: Pop; pop rock; dance-pop
- Length: 36:29
- Label: Walt Disney / EMI (Europe)
- Producer: Various

Ross Lynch chronology
Austin & Ally (2012)	Teen Beach Movie (2013)

Austin & Ally chronology
Austin & Ally (2012)	Austin & Ally: Turn It Up (2013)

Austin & Ally is a Disney Channel soundtrack from the hit TV series of the same name. The album features songs from the show's first season performed by Ross Lynch with two bonus tracks performed with his family band R5. It was released digitally and physically by Walt Disney Records on September 11, 2012.

== Background and release ==
During a commercial for the single "Heard It on the Radio", Ross Lynch announced that a soundtrack for the show was on its way. The track list was revealed on July 20, 2012. On August 6, 2012, the soundtrack cover was revealed by the magazine BOP and Tiger Beat. On the week of September 3, 2012, Radio Disney Planet Premiered songs from the album. Candice and Ross 'took over' the radio station every night at 8PM ET for one hour until September 7, 2012. Ross Lynch promoted the soundtrack on a West Coast Tour on May 3, 2012 to May 15, 2012. and on an East Coast Tour from December 15, 2012 to December 31. The soundtrack was also promoted while Ross Lynch was on tour with his band in 2013 from March 15 in Santa Monica, California to July 5 in London, England. A CD signing was held in Disneyland on September 23, 2012. The signing was held at Studio Disney 365 in Downtown Disney.

== Charts and chart performance ==
The soundtrack peaked at #27 on the Billboard 200. It also debuted at #1 on the iTunes Soundtrack chart and remained there for four weeks.

== Track listing ==
Austin & Ally – Standard edition
No.	Title	Length
1.	"Heard It on the Radio"	2:38
2.	"A Billion Hits"	3:08
3.	"Not a Love Song"	3:02
4.	"Illusion"	2:17
5.	"Na Na Na"	2:23
6.	"Double Take"	2:24
7.	"It's Me, It's You"	2:57
8.	"Heart Beat"	3:05
9.	"Better Together"	2:26
10.	"The Way That You Do"	2:38
11.	"Break Down the Walls"	2:42
12.	"Can't Do It Without You" (Theme Song)	2:47
13.	"Crazy 4 U" (R5)	3:00
14.	"What Do I Have to Do?" (R5)	3:02
Total length:		36:29

bonus track
No.	Title	Length
15.	"Can You Feel It"	2:48

== Charts ==
=== Weekly charts ===
Chart (2012)	Peak position
US Billboard 200	27
US Kid Albums (Billboard)	1
US Soundtrack Albums (Billboard)	1

=== Year-end charts ===
Chart (2013)	Position
US Soundtrack Albums (Billboard)	13
