= R5 discography =

Discography

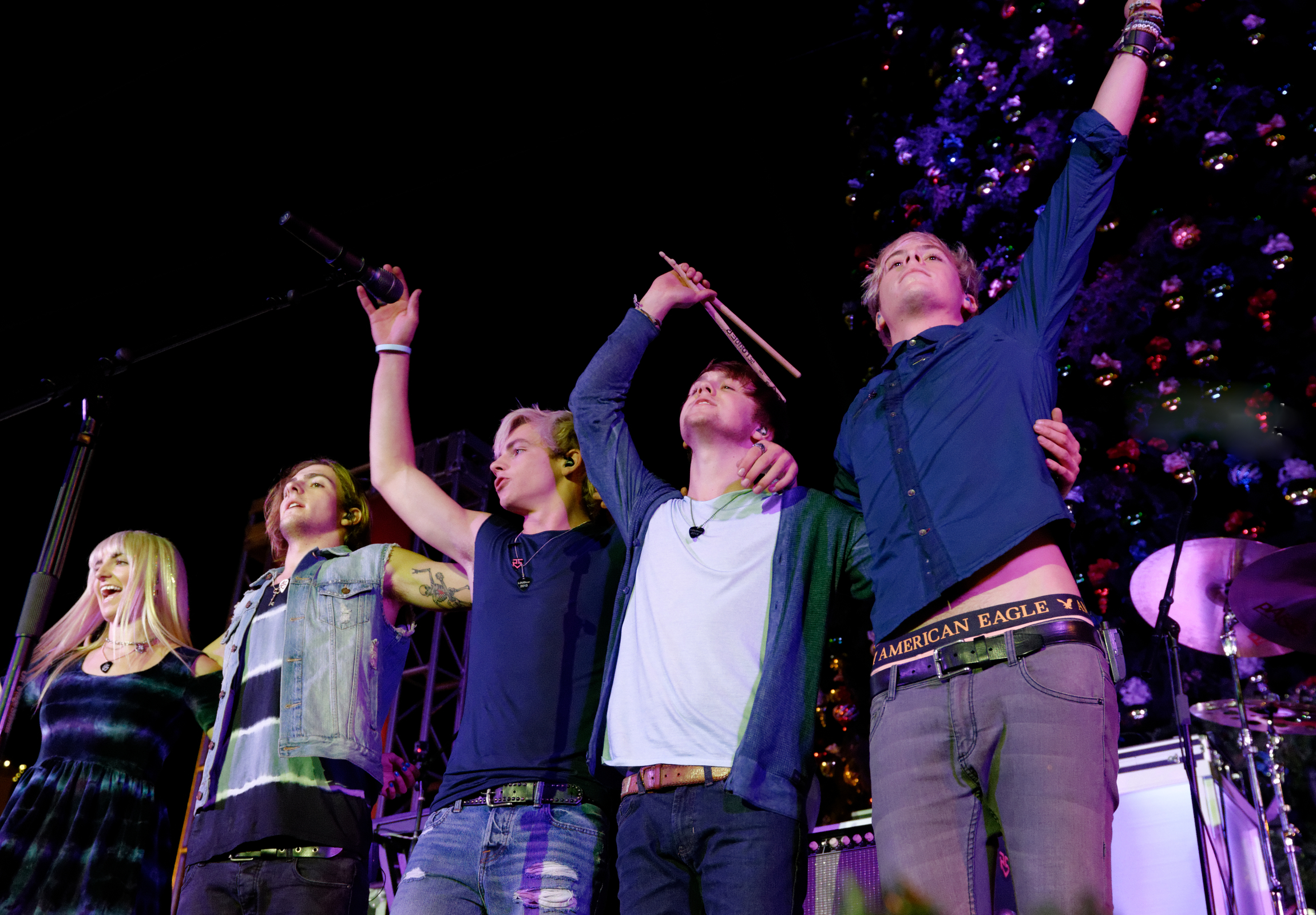
- R5 in 2014
- Studio albums: 2
- EPs: 5
- Singles: 14
- Video albums: 1
- Music videos: 22
- Promotional singles: 4

American pop rock band R5 released two studio albums, five extended plays, thirteen singles, two promotional singles, twenty-two music videos and other album appearances. In March 2010, they self-released an EP, Ready Set Rock and in September they signed with Hollywood Records. The second EP, Loud, was released on February 19, 2013, which featured the lead single and title track "Loud", the debut single from upcoming album. The band's first full-length album, Louder, was released on September 24, 2013 and the album not only includes the four songs from Loud and also seven new songs. The second single from the album, "Pass Me By", premiered on Radio Disney on August 16. The music video premiered on 29 August on Disney Channel and is available for public viewing on the band's Vevo channel. The third single, "(I Can't) Forget About You", was released on December 25, 2013 and reached number 47 on Billboard Digital Pop Songs, and the fourth single "One Last Dance" on May 29, 2014.

The third extended play, Heart Made Up on You, was released on July 22, 2014 and the self-titled single on August 1, 2014. Previously the next album, the band released two singles, "Smile" and "Let's Not Be Alone Tonight". The second album, Sometime Last Night, released on July 10, 2015 and peaked at number six in United States. "All Night", "I Know You Got Away" and "Dark Side" was released as singles of the album.

== Albums ==
=== Studio albums ===
List of albums, with selected chart positions
Title	Album details	Peak chart positions										Sales
Title	Album details	US	AUS	BEL (Fl)	CAN	IRE	ITA	JPN	POR	SPA	UK	Sales
Louder	Released: September 24, 2013; Format: CD, digital download; Label: Hollywood	24	—	47	—	59	11	60	13	—	149	US: 150,000
Sometime Last Night	Released: July 10, 2015; Format: CD, digital download; Label: Hollywood	6	19	70	12	55	16	92	2	5	73	
"—" denotes releases that didn't chart or were not released in that country.

=== Video albums ===
List of albums, with selected chart positions
Title	Album details
Live at the Greek Theatre	Released: March 11, 2016; Format: DVD, digital download; Label: Hollywood

== Extended plays ==
List of EPs, with selected chart positions
Title	EP details	Peak chart positions				Sales
Title	EP details	US	NZ Heat.	POL	SPA	Sales
Ready Set Rock	Released: March 9, 2010; Format: Digital download; Label: Self-released	—	—	—	—	
Loud	Released: February 19, 2013; Format: CD, digital download; Label: Hollywood	69	—	—	38	US: 50,000
Live in London	Released: May 29, 2014; Format: Digital download; Label: Hollywood	—	—	—	—	
Heart Made Up on You	Released: July 22, 2014; Format: CD, digital download; Label: Hollywood	36	—	19	—	US: 20,000
New Addictions	Released: May 12, 2017; Format: CD, digital download; Label: Hollywood	52	— (Note: "New Addictions" did not enter the Top 40 Albums, but peaked at number six on the Heatseekers Albums.)	—	9	
"—" denotes releases that didn't chart or were not released in that country.

== Singles ==
=== As lead artist ===
List of singles, with selected chart positions
Title	Year	Peak chart positions					Album
Title	Year	US Pop	US Pop Digital	US Dance	JPN	UK	Album
"Say You'll Stay"	2011	—	—	—	—	—	Rock Set Rock
"Crazy 4 U"	2012	—	—	—	—	—	Austin & Ally
"Loud"	2013	—	—	—	72	199	Louder
"Pass Me By"	2013	—	50	—	—	—	Louder
"(I Can't) Forget About You"	2013	—	47	—	—	—	Louder
"One Last Dance"	2014	—	—	—	—	—	Louder
"Heart Made Up on You"	2014	—	—	—	—	—	Heart Made Up on You
"Smile"	2014	—	—	—	—	—	Sometime Last Night
"Let's Not Be Alone Tonight"	2015	38	—	—	—	—	Sometime Last Night
"All Night"	2015	—	—	—	—	—	Sometime Last Night
"I Know You Got Away"	2015	—	—	—	—	—	Sometime Last Night
"Dark Side"	2016	—	—	—	—	—	Sometime Last Night
"F.E.E.L.G.O.O.D."	2016	—	—	—	—	—	Sometime Last Night
"If"	2017	—	—	8	—	—	New Addictions
"Hurts Good"	2017	—	—	—	—	—	New Addictions
"—" denotes releases that didn't chart or were not released in that country.

=== As featured artist ===
Song	Year	Album
"Make Some Noise" (Artists Against Bullying)	2012	Non-album single

=== Promotional singles ===
Song	Year	Album
"I Want U Bad"	2013	Loud
"Things Are Looking Up"	2014	Heart Made Up on You
"Wild Hearts"	2015	Sometime Last Night

== Other charted songs ==
List of singles, with selected chart positions
Title	Year	Peak positions	Album
Title	Year	US Holiday	Album
"Christmas Is Coming"	2012	14	Disney Channel Holiday Playlist

== Guest appearances ==
Title	Year	Album
"Crazy 4 U"	2012	Austin & Ally
"What Do I Have to Do?”	2012	Austin & Ally
"Fallin' for You"	2013	Universitari - Molto Più Che Amici
"Christmas Is Coming" (Acoustic Version)	2013	Disney Holidays Unwrapped
"Starting Over"	2015	Teen Beach 2

== Music videos ==
=== As main artist ===
List of music videos, showing director(s)
Title	Year	Director(s)	Ref.
"Without You"	2010	Riker Lynch	
"Can't Get Enough of You"	2010	Riker Lynch	
"Never"	2010	Riker Lynch	
"Say You'll Stay"	2012	—N/a	
"Loud"	2013	Ryan Pallotta	
"Pass Me By"	2013	Ryan Pallotta	
"Rock That Rock"	2014	—N/a	
"(I Can't) Forget About You"	2014	Thom Glunt	
"One Last Dance"	2014	Michel Sandy	
"Heart Made Up on You"	2014	Thom Glunt	
"Things Are Looking Up"	2014	Ellington Ratliff	
"Smile"	2014	Michel Borden	
"Let's Not Be Alone Tonight"	2015	Robert Hales	
"All Night"	2015	Michel Borden	
"I Know You Got Away"	2015	Will Von Bolton	
"Wild Hearts"	2015	Rocky Lynch	
"Dark Side"	2016	Riker Lynch and Rocky Lynch	
"If"	2017	Michel Borden	
"Hurts Good"	2017	Drew Kirsch	

=== As featured artist ===
List of featured music videos, showing director(s)
Title	Year	Artist	Director(s)	Ref.
"Make Some Noise"	2012	Artists Against Bullying	Unknown	
