= Obsession Tour =

2025 concert tour by the Driver Era

- Tour by the Driver Era
- Promotional poster for the tour
- Location: North America; Oceania; South America
- Associated album: Obsession
- Start date: 18 January 2025
- End date: 18 July 2025
- No. of shows: 50
- Supporting acts: Cassie Henderson; Ben Swissa

the Driver Era concert chronology
- X Girlfriend Tour (2024); Obsession Tour (2025)

The Obsession Tour was the sixth concert tour by the American music duo the Driver Era. The tour started on January 18, 2025, in Auckland, New Zealand, and concluded in Los Angeles, United States, on July 18, 2025, consisting of a total of 50 shows.

== Announcements ==
On September 30, 2024, the Driver Era announced the tour, with 50 shows across Oceania, North America and South America from January through July 2025. Cassie Henderson and Ben Swissa acted as supporting acts for select concerts.

== Set list ==
This set list is from the concert in Rio de Janeiro, on April 30, 2025.

1. "Touch"
2. "Better"
3. "You Keep Me Up at Night"
4. "The Weekend"
5. "Same Old Story"
6. "Don’t Walk Away"
7. "Heaven Angel" / "When You Need a Man"
8. "Everybody’s Lover"
9. "Low"
10. "Nobody Knows"/ "I Gotta Feeling"
11. "Nothing Left to Lose"
12. "Natural"
13. "Can’t Believe She Got Away"
14. "Scared of Heights"
15. "On My Own"
16. "Afterglow"
17. "Malibu"
18. "I’d Rather Die"
19. "Don’t Take The Night"

Encore:

1. "Rumors"
2. "Get Off My Phone"
3. "A Kiss"

== Tour dates ==
List of 2025 concerts
Date (2025)	City	Country	Venue	Supporting acts
January 18	Auckland	New Zealand	Auckland Town Hall	Cassie Henderson
January 21	Brisbane	Australia	Fortitude Music Hall	—N/a
January 24	Sydney	Australia	Hordern Pavilion	Ben Swissa
January 25	Melbourne	Australia	Festival Hall	—N/a
January 27	Adelaide	Australia	Hindley Street Music Hall	—N/a
March 7	Fort Lauderdale	United States	FTL War Memorial	—N/a
March 8	Tampa	United States	Yuengling Center	—N/a
March 10	Birmingham	United States	Avondale Brewing Company	—N/a
March 11	Atlanta	United States	Coca-Cola Roxy	—N/a
March 13	Moon Township	United States	UPMC Events Center	—N/a
March 14	Chicago	United States	Byline Bank Aragon Ballroom	—N/a
March 16	Cincinnati	United States	Andrew J. Brady Music Center	—N/a
March 19	Waukee	United States	Vibrant Music Hall	—N/a
March 21	Austin	United States	Stubb's Waller Creek Amphitheater	—N/a
March 22	Houston	United States	713 Music Hall	—N/a
March 24	Denver	United States	Fillmore Auditorium	—N/a
March 26	Salt Lake City	United States	The Union Event Center	—N/a
March 28	Garden City	United States	Revolution Concert House	—N/a
April 25	Buenos Aires	Argentina	Estadio Obras Sanitarias	—N/a
April 27	Santiago	Chile	Teatro Caupolicán	—N/a
April 30	Rio de Janeiro	Brazil	Sacadura 154	—N/a
May 2	São Paulo	Brazil	Tom Brasil	—N/a
May 30	Milwaukee	United States	BMO Pavilion	—N/a
May 31	Minneapolis	United States	Minneapolis Armory	—N/a
June 2	Sterling Heights	United States	Michigan Lottery Amphitheater	—N/a
June 3	Indianapolis	United States	Everwise Amphitheater	—N/a
June 5	Toronto	Canada	Coca-Cola Coliseum	—N/a
June 6	Lewiston	United States	Artpark	—N/a
June 8	Uncasville	United States	Mohegan Sun Arena	—N/a
June 11	Philadelphia	United States	The Met	—N/a
June 13	Asbury Park	United States	Stone Pony Summer Stage	—N/a
June 14	Boston	United States	Leader Bank Pavilion	—N/a
June 16	Baltimore	United States	Pier Six Pavilion	—N/a
June 18	Virginia Beach	United States	TBA	—N/a
June 20	Raleigh	United States	Red Hat Amphitheater	—N/a
June 21	Charleston	United States	Firefly Distillery	—N/a
June 22	Charlotte	United States	Skyla Credit Union Amphitheatre	—N/a
June 24	Nashville	United States	Ascend Amphitheater	—N/a
June 27	Maryland Heights	United States	St. Louis Music Park	—N/a
June 29	Kansas City	United States	Starlight Theatre	—N/a
July 1	Irving	United States	The Pavilion at the Toyota Music Factory	—N/a
July 3	Phoenix	United States	Arizona Financial Theatre	—N/a
July 5	Las Vegas	United States	Brooklyn Bowl	—N/a
July 9	Seattle	United States	WAMU Theater	—N/a
July 10	Vancouver	Canada	Thunderbird Sports Centre	—N/a
July 12	Portland	United States	Theater of the Clouds	—N/a
July 15	Mountain View	United States	Shoreline Amphitheatre	—N/a
July 16	San Diego	United States	Gallagher Square	—N/a
July 18	Los Angeles	United States	Hollywood Palladium	—N/a
