= Obsession (The Driver Era album) =

2025 studio album by the Driver Era

- Physical editions cover (Note: The digital editions cover feature only the central picture, without the beige border.)

Studio album by the Driver Era
- Released: April 11, 2025
- Genres: Rock; electropop
- Length: 30:27
- Label: TOO
- Producers: Morgan Taylor Reid; Rocky Lynch; Ross Lynch

The Driver Era chronology
Live at the Greek (2023)	Obsession (2025)

Singles from Obsession
- 1. "You Keep Me Up at Night" Released: September 4, 2024; 2. "Don't Walk Away" Released: October 23, 2024; 3. "Touch" Released: December 17, 2024; 4. "Same Old Story" Released: January 28, 2025; 5. "Don't Take the Night" Released: February 26, 2025; 6. "Can't Believe She Got Away" Released: February 28, 2025; 7. "I'd Rather Die" Released: March 28, 2025

Obsession is the fourth studio album by the American music duo the Driver Era, released on April 11, 2025, through TOO Records. The album features a sole guest appearance from Fern. Production was handled by the duo themselves, Rocky and Ross Lynch, alongside Morgan Taylor Reid. It serves as a follow up to their third studio album, Summer Mixtape (2022).

The album was preceded by the release of seven singles: "You Keep Me Up at Night", "Don't Walk Away", "Touch", "Same Old Story", along with "Don't Take the Night", "Can't Believe She Got Away" and "I'd Rather Die". To promote the release, the duo embarked on their sixth concert tour, Obsession Tour, which started on January 18, 2025, in Auckland, New Zealand, and concluded in Los Angeles, United States, on July 18, 2025.

== Background ==
On September 16, 2022, the band released their third studio album, Summer Mixtape, through TOO Records. To promote the new album, the band embarked on a concert tour, Live On Tour '22, which ran for 57 cities across the US, Europe, Australia, New Zealand and Japan. They then announced they would be playing a sold-out concert at the Greek Theatre, in Los Angeles, on June 11, 2023, as part of their tour. The concert was recorded and released as their first live album, Live at the Greek (2023).

The band released their next single, "Rumors", on October 20, 2023, with its music video arriving a few weeks later. The song was called by Hannah Gadd, of the Red Brick, as a "perfect extension of their quintessential sound" while also displaying another side to the band's artistic world. Then, on February 22, 2024, the duo released the follow-up song "Get Off My Phone", which was also accompanied by an official music video. Teguan Harris of The Indiependent wrote that the single is an "exceptional song about heartbreak and anguish in the digital age and a new perspective on how haunting heartache can be" and that it is a "magnificent catalyst for [the Driver Era's] year in music".

== Release and promotion ==
Honestly, I think that’s a great example of how we approach music, and also just like our lives [...] I interpret obsession as something you’re just thinking about all the time, something you can’t really shake loose.

— Ross Lynch on what does 'Obsession' mean to them, via interview for Clash.

On September 4, 2024, The Driver Era released a new song, "You Keep Me Up at Night", which served as the lead single for the upcoming album. The song was accompanied by a music video, released two weeks later. On October 23, 2024, the band released "Don't Walk Away" as the second single from Obsession. Then, "Touch" was released on December 17, 2024, serving as the third single from the album.

On January 28, 2025, The Driver Era announced their fourth studio album, titled Obsession, which is set to be released on April 11, 2025. Along with the album announcement, the band released "Same Old Story" as the fourth single. The band asked fans, through their social media accounts, to vote which song should be released as the next single. "Don't Take the Night" was released as the fifth single, on February 26, 2025, while "Can't Believe She Got Away" was released two days later. One month later, on March 28, 2025, the Driver Era released the seventh single, and last to be released prior to the album, "I'd Rather Die".

During one of their tour's stop, the band was interviewed for Billboard, when they gave the magazine an exclusive preview of their yet-to-be-released song, "The Weekend". Ross Lynch explained that the song talks about "wanting to connect with someone and be close to someone, but also having a fear of commitment". The official music video for the song was released alongside the album, on April 11, 2025. The video explores concepts of modern relationships.

=== Tour ===
To promote the release, the duo embarked on their sixth concert tour, Obsession Tour, which started on January 18, 2025, in Auckland, New Zealand and concluded in Los Angeles, United States, on July 18, 2025. During the course of the tour, the duo performed in Australia, New Zealand, as well as North and South America.

== Production and music ==
According to the band members, the creative process of the album is nonlinear, with some songs taking more time to develop than others. The brothers regard the process of finishing a song as vulnerable, depending on how personal the lyrics are. "You Keep Me Up at Night" was described by Abby Anderson of Melodic Magazine as a "mysterious, slow-burning track that pulls listeners into a twilight world where obsession feels like destiny". The song "Don't Walk Away" was described by Josh Sharpe, from the theater news website BroadwayWorld, as a groovy, upbeat song in which the band lean towards a confessional lyric style. Dom Vigil from Prelude Press described "Touch" as having a "dark, ambient bass that serves as a moody backdrop for Ross’ playful vocals". The critic also described the single "Same Old Story" as having a "bouncy, upbeat offering that gives an early glimpse into the earworms that fans can expect from the upcoming album". He further noticed that the song draws inspiration from 80s tones, with a "mixture of synths and a bright backing guitar".

Ross Lynch described "The Weekend" as a good representation of what the album means, citing the "obsession of trying to make the most of the time and the fact that the weekend really signifies, culturally, this time of freedom". The singer explained that the lyrics talk about having no expectations in a relationship. Melodic Magazine's Abby Anderson described "Nothing Left to Lose" as a "jazzier, electro-piano driven" song that serves as a return to the record's "midnight moodiness" from previous tracks. Josh Sharpe from BroadwayWorld highlighted "immensely danceable groove" from the song "Don't Take the Night", noting its 70s disco inspirations. He also wrote that the band displayed they "deft touch as producers" on the song "Can't Believe She Got Away", which features multiple layers of "subtle sounds that add up to create the crunchy, soulful groove".

Writing for Dork, Sam Taylor described the seventh single, "I'd Rather Die", as a "minimalist jazz-influenced" song in which the vocals are layered and supported by piano and drums. Caitlyn Finkelstein of Square One noted the juxtaposition of the negative lyrics of "Everybody's Lover" compared to its classic pop sound. She also highlighted the difference in comparison with other tracks from the album, which feel more upbeat. The song "Better" is about trying to find the best version of one's self, with Ross Lynch explaining that "it's kind of about how a past circumstance makes you better" and that "pain is weakness leaving the body".

== Critical reception ==
Professional ratings
Review scores
Source	Rating
Clash	7/10
Dork	4/5

Obsession received generally positive reviews from music critics. Writing for Clash, Rachel Min Leong called the album "fearless and expansive", describing the album as a blend of the band's previous records, Girlfriend (2021), for its confessional lyrics, and Summer Mixtape (2022), for the musical vibe. She highlighted the mix of rock and electro-pop sounds, which created an "introspection that sits between the spaces of adventure and exploration". Abby Anderson of Melodic Magazine wrote that the album is a "feverish, hypnotic ride through a disco-infused pop-rock world". She complimented the album's overall production and immersive sound, naming the duo "masters of sultry, cinematic sonic storytelling".

Daniela Avila, from People, wrote that Obsession is "worth obsessing over". Dork's Harry Shaw gave a four out of five review, complimenting the production's precision, which created a cohesive sound. The critic also positively commented on the themes and lyrics, circling around impermanence and transformation, and noted the album as the band's "most assured release to date", leaving a lasting impression to listeners. Ivan Guzman of Paper named Obsession the band's most refined album to date, calling it "tightly cohesive set of songs that lean into synthy, nocturnal moods and candid introspection". Guzman noted that, although the album has its vulnerabilities, it never loses its edge. Writing for Square One Caitlyn Finkelstein wrote that the record perfectly "encapsulates the messiness of romantic endeavours". She argued that body of work would satisfy both longtime fans and newcomers alike.

== Track listing ==
All lyrics are written by Rocky Lynch and Ross Lynch, except "Touch" (written with Ellington Ratliff) and "Everybody's Lover" (written by Rocky Lynch).

Obsession track listing
No.	Title	Music	Length
1.	"You Keep Me Up at Night"	Rocky Lynch; Ross Lynch; Ryland Lynch; Ellington Ratliff	2:18
2.	"Don't Walk Away"	Rocky Lynch; Ross Lynch; Ratliff; Morgan Taylor Reid	2:32
3.	"Touch"	Rocky Lynch; Ross Lynch; Ratliff	2:48
4.	"Same Old Story"	Rocky Lynch; Ross Lynch; Ratliff; Reid	2:51
5.	"The Weekend" (featuring Fern)	Rocky Lynch; Ross Lynch; Brittany Burton; Nicholas Petricca	2:32
6.	"Nothing Left to Lose"	Rocky Lynch; Ross Lynch; Garrison Jones; Ratliff	3:21
7.	"Don't Take the Night"	Rocky Lynch; Ross Lynch; Ratliff; Reid	3:49
8.	"I'd Rather Die"	Rocky Lynch; Ross Lynch; Ratliff; Reid	2:19
9.	"Can't Believe She Got Away"	Rocky Lynch; Ross Lynch; Jones; Ratliff	2:44
10.	"Everybody's Lover"	Rocky Lynch; Burton; Ratliff	2:52
11.	"Better"	Rocky Lynch; Ross Lynch; Jones; Ratliff	2:21
Total length:			30:27

Deluxe edition track listing
No.	Title	Music	Length
12.	"Over Again"	Rocky Lynch; Ross Lynch; Jones; Ratliff	3:23
13.	"Tried"	Rocky Lynch; Ross Lynch; Jones; Ratliff	3:18
Total length:			37:08

== Personnel ==
Credits adapted from Tidal.

=== The Driver Era ===
- Rocky Lynch – vocals (tracks 1, 2, 4, 6–13), production (1, 3–13), bass (3, 5, 6, 9–13), drums (3, 5, 9–13), guitar (3, 5, 6, 8–13), engineering (3, 6, 10, 11–13), programming (3, 5, 6, 10, 11–13)
- Ross Lynch – vocals (tracks 1–5, 7–13), production (1, 3–13), guitar (2, 8), engineering (3, 5, 6, 10, 11–13), keyboards (4)

=== Additional contributors ===
- Morgan Taylor Reid – production (tracks 2, 7, 8), mixing (tracks 2, 4, 7); bass, drums, programming, engineering (4, 7, 8); vocals (4, 8), 12-string bass guitar (4), guitar (7, 8)
- Garrison Jones – production (track 9)
- Chris Gehringer – mastering
- Bill Zimmerman – mixing (tracks 3, 11)
- Justin Stanley – mixing (tracks 6, 9)
- Erik Madrid – mixing (track 10)
- Sanjeevi Easwar – mixing assistance (track 10)
- Dave Briggs – drums (tracks 5, 6, 9–11)
- Ellington Ratliff – vocals (track 8)

== Release history ==
Obsession release history
Region	Date	Format(s)	Edition(s)	Label	Ref.
Various	April 11, 2025	Digital download; streaming; vinyl LP; picture disc	Standard	TOO Records	
Various	May 23, 2025	CD; digital download; streaming	Deluxe	TOO Records	
