= Live at the Greek (The Driver Era album) =

2023 live album by The Driver Era

Live album by the Driver Era
- Released: December 8, 2023
- Recorded: June 11, 2023
- Venue: Greek Theatre, Los Angeles, US
- Length: 72:59
- Label: TOO Records
- Producer: Rocky Lynch; Ross Lynch

The Driver Era chronology
Summer Mixtape (2022)	Live at the Greek (2023)	Obsession (2025)

Live at the Greek is the first live album from American music duo the Driver Era, released on December 8, 2023, by TOO Records. It features live renditions of songs from the band's first three studio albums, X (2019), Girlfriend (2021) and Summer Mixtape (2022), as well as an unreleased song, "Summertime Baby".

The album was recorded during the band's sold-out concert at the Greek Theatre, on June 11, 2023. It became the first on the band's catalog to appear on several charts on the UK.

The release of the album is intended to be accompanied by two films: a documentary and the live concert that became the live album, both of which are yet to be released.

== Background and promotion ==
This was a celebration of our evolution personally and how our fans have grown with us throughout all these years. We’ve been doing this for about 15 years now and we see fans all the time that have been with us since day one.

– Ross Lynch on the performance at the Greek Theater, Los Angeles, via interview for American Songwriter.

The band announced they would be playing a sold-out concert at the Greek Theatre, in Los Angeles, as part of their tour. This show marked the second time Ross and Rocky played at the venue, having performed there in 2015, as part of their previous act R5.

For American Songwriter, Ross said that the song "Summertime Baby" was only included on the live album because of a sample that the band couldn't get permission to use, so they couldn't add it to one of their studio records. On November 21, 2023, they released the live rendition for the song "A Kiss", along with its video, in advance to the release of the album.

== Commercial performance ==
On the UK, the album appeared on a few of the charts, including the UK Independent Album Breakers Chart at number one, UK Independent Albums Chart and UK Record Store Chart, both at number nine.

== Track listing ==
Live at the Greek track listing
No.	Title	Writer(s)	Length
1.	"Feel You Now"	Ross Lynch; Rocky Lynch; Ellington Ratliff	4:48
2.	"Natural"	Ross Lynch; Rocky Lynch; Ratliff; Morgan Reid	3:07
3.	"Summertime Baby"	Ross Lynch; Rocky Lynch	2:56
4.	"Afterglow"	Ross Lynch; Rocky Lynch	3:46
5.	"OMG Plz Don't Come Around"/ "Like A King"	Ross Lynch; Rocky Lynch	2:55
6.	"When You Need a Man"	Ross Lynch; Rocky Lynch; Nathanael Anderson	3:28
7.	"Places"	Ross Lynch; Rocky Lynch	3:21
8.	"Nobody Knows"	Ross Lynch; Rocky Lynch; Ratliff	4:18
9.	"Keep Moving Forward"	Ross Lynch; Rocky Lynch; Nikka Costa	3:19
10.	"Fantasy"	Ross Lynch; Rocky Lynch	3:09
11.	"Heaven Angel"	Ross Lynch; Rocky Lynch	5:36
12.	"I Got You, You Got Me"	Ross Lynch; Rocky Lynch	2:47
13.	"San Francisco"	Ross Lynch; Rocky Lynch; Ratliff	3:58
14.	"Take Me Away"	Ross Lynch; Rocky Lynch	3:05
15.	"Malibu"	Ross Lynch; Rocky Lynch; Griff Clawson	3:53
16.	"Preacher Man"	Julian Bunetta; Edward Drewett; Gamal Lewis; Jacob Kasher Hindlin; John Henry Ryan	4:30
17.	"Heart of Mine"	Ross Lynch; Rocky Lynch	4:24
18.	"Low"	Rocky Lynch	3:48
19.	"A Kiss"	Ross Lynch; Rocky Lynch; Ratliff	5:51
Total length:			72:59

== Personnel ==
Credits are adapted from the album's liner notes.

=== The Driver Era ===
- Ross Lynch – production, vocals, guitar, bass
- Rocky Lynch – production, vocals, guitar, bass

=== Technical ===
- Guy Charbonneau – recording engineering, mixing
- Craig Robertson – pro tools and stage A2
- Todd Shaffer – pro tools and stage A2
- Anthony Catalano – mixing
- Chris Gehringer – mastering

== Charts ==
=== Weekly charts ===
Weekly chart performance for Live at the Greek
Chart (2024)	Peak position
UK Albums Chart Update (OCC)	94
UK Albums Sales Chart (OCC)	20
UK Physical Albums Chart (OCC)	18
UK Record Store Chart (OCC)	9
UK Independent Albums Chart (OCC)	9
UK Independent Album Breakers (OCC)	1

== Release history ==
Live at the Greek release history
Region	Date	Format(s)	Label	Ref.
Various	December 8, 2023	CD; digital download; streaming; vinyl LP; CD book	TOO Records	
