= Dark Side (R5 song) =

Single by R5

from the album Sometime Last Night
- Released: February 1, 2016
- Genre: Funk-pop
- Length: 3:08
- Label: Hollywood
- Songwriters: Ross Lynch; Riker Lynch; Rocky Lynch; Ellington Ratliff; Brigitte Guitart
- Producers: Matt Wallace; Rocky Lynch

R5 singles chronology
"I Know You Got Away" (2015)	"Dark Side" (2016)	"If" (2017)

"Dark Side" is a song by American pop rock band R5. It was released on February 1, 2016 as the fifth and final single from Sometime Last Night. It was written by Ross Lynch, Riker Lynch, Rocky Lynch, Brigitte Guitart and Ellington Ratliff, and produced by Rocky Lynch and Matt Wallace.

== Background and release ==
In an interview to Billboard, Ross said that "Dark Side" was the first song written for the album and it generated inspiration for the band to write other songs. He said: "I think it was at that moment that we realized we actually have the capability and the skill set to just write the whole record. And then we just kept writing songs and beating off songs that we previously had. We had a checklist; We'd be like, 'Alright, 'Dark Side' is better than this song, so it'll take that song's spot, and then this song can take this other song's spot.' We basically worked our way down and replaced the whole record". The funky guitar riffs came about with a bass line from Rocky, then the band sprinkled a little synth on top". It was written by Ross Lynch, Riker Lynch, Rocky Lynch, Brigitte Guitart and Ellington Ratliff, and produced by Rocky and Matt Wallace.

The song was released on February 1, 2016. To Maria Ciezak of The Aquarian, Riker commented that the band wanted the song as a single from the beginning of the album: "Everyone on our crew, our friends, our fans, everybody kept telling us "Dark Side" is the one you have to make the single! We all love it, and we know it’s a fan favorite, so it’s been going over really well".

== Reception ==
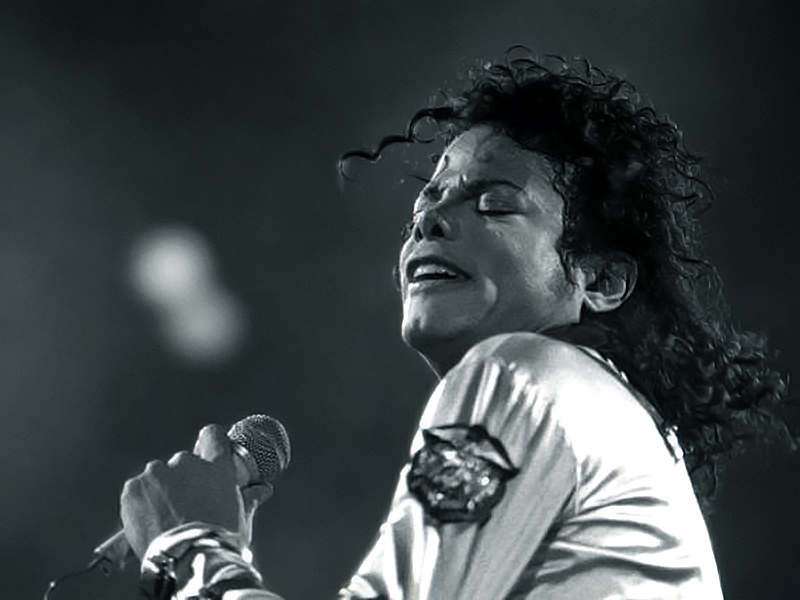
"Dark Side" was compared to songs of Michael Jackson.

"Dark Side" received positive reviews from critics. Jamee-Beth Livingston of Breakaway Daily said the song brings "a deeper level of honesty and realness" in their songwriting. She also said the band "giving in to bad temptations because they usually end up making good stories". Tim Sendra of AllMusic was positive and said that "Dark Side" "has a loose-limbed bounce that's missing from the pro tracks, the disco throwback". Gary Graff of Billboard was positive about the funk-theme direction, highlighting the other songs of the album, and compared it to songs of Michael Jackson. Katrina M. of Sputinik Music was positive and said the song is reversed, bright and cheerful.

Katy Amjs of Music Is The Home For You Pain said she was surprised by the disco rhythm and commented: "Unlike its title indicates, the track is fast paced from the first beat and maintains its energy throughout". She also said that the song convincing the listener to get up and dance along. Emery Columna of Maaf Box said that "Dark Side" is the key that opens the traditional rock door that held the R5 within the predictable. He also said: "[the song] is a clue to where R5 can go musically to break the evil spell some [critics] have unfairly cast upon this groovy band".

== Music video ==
The "Dark Side" music video was released on March 10, 2016 and directed by band members. The video was recorded by R5 with a GoPro and contains scenes of the Sometime Last Night Tour, showing concerts by the United States, Europe, New Zealand, Australia and Brazil, meet with fans and behind the scenes of travel. Ross said the band chose not to record a studio video clip, because they wanted their own vision of the before and after shows to show for the fans.

== Release history ==
Country	Date	Format(s)	Label
United States	February 1, 2016	Digital download	Hollywood
