= Same Old Story (The Driver Era song) =

2025 single by the Driver Era

Single by the Driver Era

from the album Obsession
- Released: January 28, 2025
- Length: 2:51
- Label: TOO
- Songwriters: Ellington Ratliff; Ross Lynch; Rocky Lynch; Morgan Taylor Reid
- Producers: Ross Lynch; Rocky Lynch

The Driver Era singles chronology
"Touch" (2024)	"Same Old Story" (2025)	"Don't Take the Night" (2025)

Audio
- "Same Old Story" on YouTube

"Same Old Story" is a song by American duo the Driver Era. It was released as the fourth single from their fourth studio album, Obsession, on January 28, 2025.

== Background and release ==
On September 4, 2024, The Driver Era released a new song, "You Keep Me Up at Night", which served as the lead single for the upcoming album, titled Obsession. On October 23, 2024, the band released "Don't Walk Away" as the second single from the album. "Touch" was released on December 17, 2024, serving as the third single from the album.

On January 28, 2025, The Driver Era announced their fourth studio album, titled Obsession, which is set to be released on April 11, 2025. Along with the album announcement, the band released "Same Old Story" as the fourth single.

== Reception ==
The single was described by Dom Vigil from Prelude Press as having a "bouncy, upbeat offering that gives an early glimpse into the earworms that fans can expect from the upcoming album". He further noticed that the song draws inspiration from 80s tones, with a "mixture of synths and a bright backing guitar".

== Credits and personnel ==
- Ross Lynch – vocals, songwriting, production
- Rocky Lynch – vocals, songwriting, production
- Ellington Ratliff – songwriting
- Morgan Taylor Reid – songwriting

== Release history ==
Release history for "Same Old Story"
Region	Date	Format	Label	Ref.
Various	December 17, 2024	Digital download; streaming	TOO Records	
