= Fantasy (The Driver Era song) =

2022 single by the Driver Era

- Dera Meelan Remix cover

Single by the Driver Era

from the album Summer Mixtape
- Released: September 16, 2022
- Length: 3:19
- Label: TOO
- Songwriters: Ross Lynch; Rocky Lynch
- Producers: Ross Lynch; Rocky Lynch

The Driver Era singles chronology
"Malibu" (2022)	"Fantasy" (2022)	"Rumors" (2023)

Music video
- "Fantasy" on YouTube

"Fantasy" is a song by American duo the Driver Era. It was released as the third and final single from their third studio album, Summer Mixtape, on September 16, 2022.

== Background and release ==
"Fantasy" originally started in our garage. At the time that's where our studio was. Since then, we've moved it into Rocky's old bedroom after I moved out of our house. I was vibing on guitar and singing, which is those ad libs you hear in the background, and Rocky was initially playing drums. It then marinated on our hard drive for a little while. A few days later I opened it up and the chorus just came to me in a rush and I sang it in and that's what you hear. I think I was a little sick at the time... but sometimes you can't beat the flow of a melody's initial inception so we kept it.

— via an interview for Consequence.

On July 28, 2022, The Driver Era released a new song, "Malibu", which served as the second single for their third album, Summer Mixtape (2022). On August 5, 2022, the band announced their third album, and released the music video for "Malibu".

On September 16, 2022, the same day as the album release, the band dropped the music video for the song.

== Critical reception ==
The Michigan Daily called the performance for "Fantasy", where Ross takes his shirt off right before the song start, an "apt pick" and that "his party trick never fails to revitalize the crowd". That move was also commented by Ross in an interview for American Songwriter, where he stated it's his favorite part of the show.

Writing for The Lamron, Edison Hubbard wrote that the song has "catchy melodies, meaningful lyrics, and pleasing instrumentals".

== Track listing ==
Digital download and streaming

1. "Fantasy" – 3:19

Digital download and streaming (Dera Meelan Remix)

1. "Fantasy" (Dera Meelan Remix) – 3:51

== Credits and personnel ==
- Ross Lynch – vocals, songwriting, production
- Rocky Lynch – vocals, songwriting, production

== Release history ==
Release history for "Fantasy"
Region	Date	Type	Format	Label	Ref.
Various	September 16, 2022	Original	Digital download; streaming	TOO Records	
Various	July 21, 2023	Dera Meelan Remix	Digital download; streaming	TOO Records	
