= I Know You Got Away =

Single by R5

from the album Sometime Last Night
- Released: October 17, 2015
- Genre: Pop rock
- Length: 3:20
- Label: Hollywood
- Songwriters: Ben Berger; Ross Lynch; Rocky Lynch; Ryan McMahon; Ellington Ratliff; Ryan Rabin
- Producer: Captain Cuts

R5 singles chronology
"All Night" (2015)	"I Know You Got Away" (2015)	"Dark Side" (2016)

"I Know You Got Away" is a song by American pop rock band R5. It was released on October 17, 2015 as the fourth single from Sometime Last Night. "I Know You Got Away" shows off "some nice arrangement skills" and a "sweepin power pop chorus" and features a powerful bass arrangement.

== Music video ==
The "I Know You Got Away" music video was released on October 16, 2015, directed by Will Von Bolton and Ross Lynch and edited by Rydel Lynch. The video takes place in 1930 and tells the story of a couple in love, dancing together to express your love. It was starring Ross and the fashion model Courtney Eaton.

== Reception ==
"I Know You Got Away" received positive reviews from critics. Martha Segovia from Confront Magazine wrote: "Overall, the album is produced in a way that accurately states how the band has developed and [...] [they] offer an easy-listening experience that has your head bopping along to each track, and singing along contently". Teen magazine Fanlala described it as "the perfect summer love song." A writer from Shine On Media said "All Night" has "the R5 sound but it also has an old school rock vibe which we love."
