= Sometime Last Night =

Studio album by R5
- Released: July 10, 2015
- Recorded: 2014–2015
- Genres: Pop rock; power pop
- Length: 40:17
- Label: Hollywood
- Producers: Captain Cuts; Jonas Jeberg; Carl Falk; Johan Carlsson; Dreamlab; Randall Bobbitt; Matt Wallace; Jens Koerkemeier; Emanuel Kiriakou; Mitch Allan; Dan Book; Josh Abraham; Brigitte Guitart; Oligee; Rocky Lynch; Travis "Tronik" Huff; Mike Daly

R5 chronology
| Heart Made Up on You (2014) | Sometime Last Night (2015) | New Addictions (2017) |

Singles from Sometime Last Night
- 1. "Smile" Released: November 14, 2014; 2. "Let's Not Be Alone Tonight" Released: February 13, 2015; 3. "All Night" Released: June 2, 2015; 4. "I Know You Got Away" Released: October 16, 2015; 5. "Dark Side" Released: February 1, 2016; 6. "F.E.E.L.G.O.O.D" Released: June 14, 201

Sometime Last Night is the second and final studio album by American pop rock band R5. It was released on July 10, 2015, by Hollywood Records. The album was announced alongside a tour, which began in June 2015 and ended in December 2016. Six singles were released from the album — "Smile", "Let's Not Be Alone Tonight", "All Night", "I Know You Got Away", "Dark Side" and "F.E.E.L.G.O.O.D". Sometime Last Night debuted at number six on the US Billboard 200, with 31,000 copies sold during its first week, making it the band's first top ten album.

== Background ==
R5 released their debut studio album Louder in September 2013, featuring the singles "Loud", "Pass Me By", "(I Can't) Forget About You" and "One Last Dance". The band promoted the album touring North America, Europe and South America. They later released their second EP, Heart Made Up on You, which they described as a "first taste" of their second studio album. The album was set to be released in spring 2015; however, Rocky Lynch announced that it was pushed back because they wanted to "get it right" for the fans. The songs from the Heart Made Up on You EP were originally scheduled to appear on the album, but R5 scrapped them and the rest of their album in favor of starting over.

== Production ==
The album's production started in summer 2014, shortly after the band ended the Louder World Tour. They released the Heart Made Up on You EP, the songs on which were scheduled to appear on Sometime Last Night. However, due to further production and revisions, Ross Lynch announced in a radio interview that the band has decided these songs will not appear on the album, because they wanted a "blank slate". Rydel Lynch also confirmed in a tweet that no songs from the EP will be featured on the album. They wanted to "get it right" for the fans, and have therefore gone through the album multiple times before finalizing it.

== Composition ==
Sometime Last Night is mainly a pop record with rock, funk and dance music elements The album opener, "All Night", is a pop rock and power pop song about "sacrificing sleep to just live it up and experience everything you can". It's been described as an "uplifting '80s-meets-2010s" track. "Wild Hearts" fuses "brilliantly shifting tempos," with "massive beats, and irresistibly sweet harmonies into an all-out powerhouse of an anthem." "Dark Side" has been described as a disco-pop song with funk influences. It was compared to Michael Jackson. The album's second single, "Let's Not Be Alone Tonight", is a "bubblegum" power pop song which features a "techno synth". "Repeating Days", a "slowed down" track, blends sad lyrics with melancholy guitar tones, gently pulsing beats and raw vocals. When the song seems to be over, it unfolds into a stripped-back acoustic pastiche in its final minute. "Repeating Days" is about a relationship Rocky was in. "That song was inspired by [...] a slightly dysfunctional situation where the same thing kept happening over and over and it just went on way too long," he explained. "Smile", the album's lead single is about "the simplicity of just happiness". "Lightning Strikes" is a "dark" rock-influenced track performed by Rydel. It is her second solo song, the first one being "Love Me Like That", included on Louder. "F.E.E.L. G.O.O.D." is a "fun, disco-throwback" R&B-influenced song. "I Know You Got Away" shows off "some nice arrangement skills" and a "sweepin power pop chorus" and features a powerful bass arrangement. "Do It Again" was described as a "lovely summer pop perfection." "Do It Again", along with album closer "Did You Have You Fun?", "reflect the lyrical tendencies of the group that are focused on the good and bad of relationships as well as their classic rock and pop infused sound".

== Release ==
On April 6, 2015, along with the release of the "Let's Not Be Alone Tonight" music video, R5 finally announced the title and release date of the album. Sometime Last Night will be available worldwide on July 10, 2015. On May 26, R5 revealed the titles of two new songs called "Wild Hearts" and "All Night". The following day, they revealed the title of another song called "Dark Side". On May 28, the title of another song called "Repeating Days" was also revealed. The band also confirmed that "Let's Not Be Alone Tonight" is track 4 of the album. Riker tweeted to confirm "Smile". On June 2, Sometime Last Night was available for iTunes pre-order, along with the release of the third single, "All Night". To correspond with the release of the album, audio versions of all standard edition songs were uploaded to the band's vevo account on YouTube.

== Reception ==
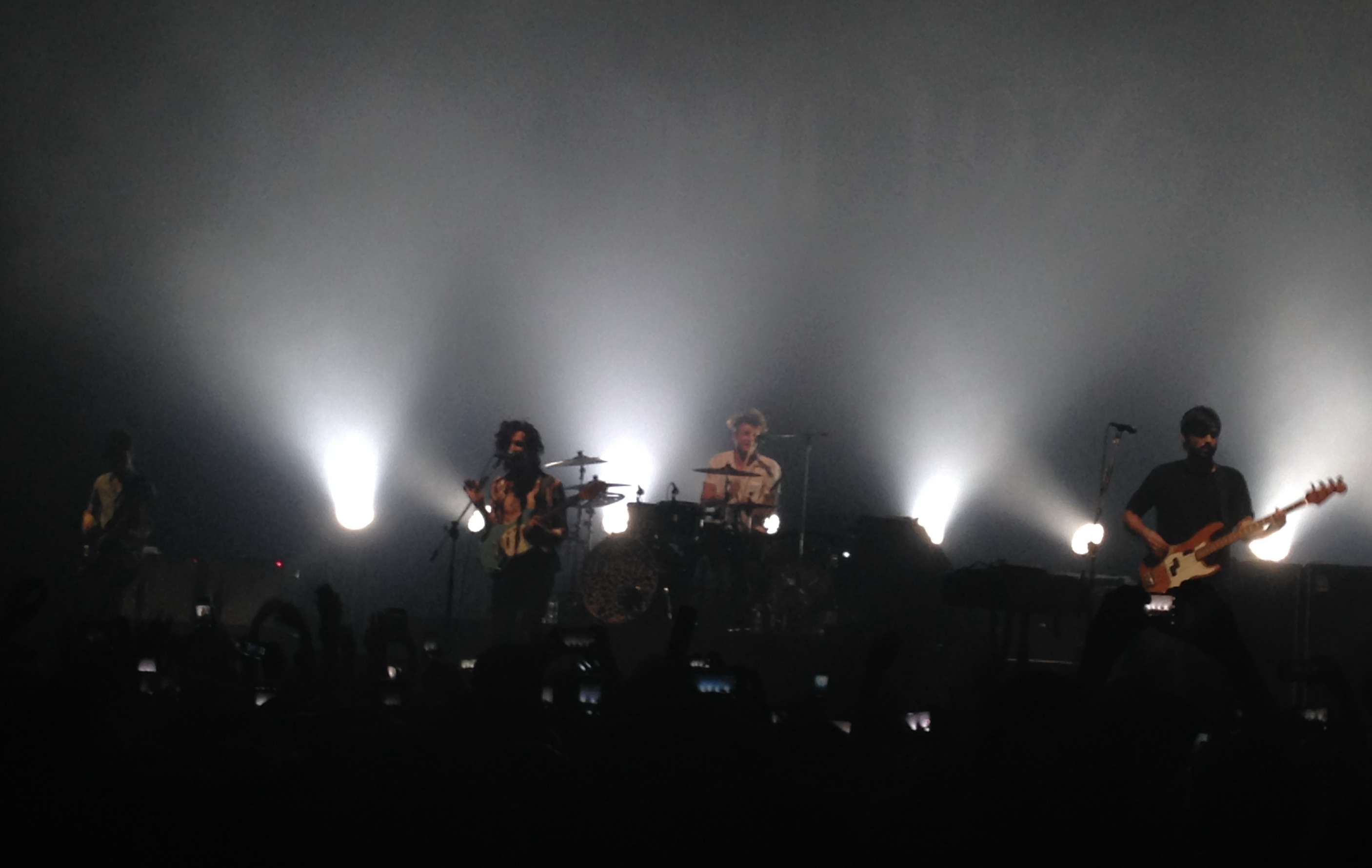
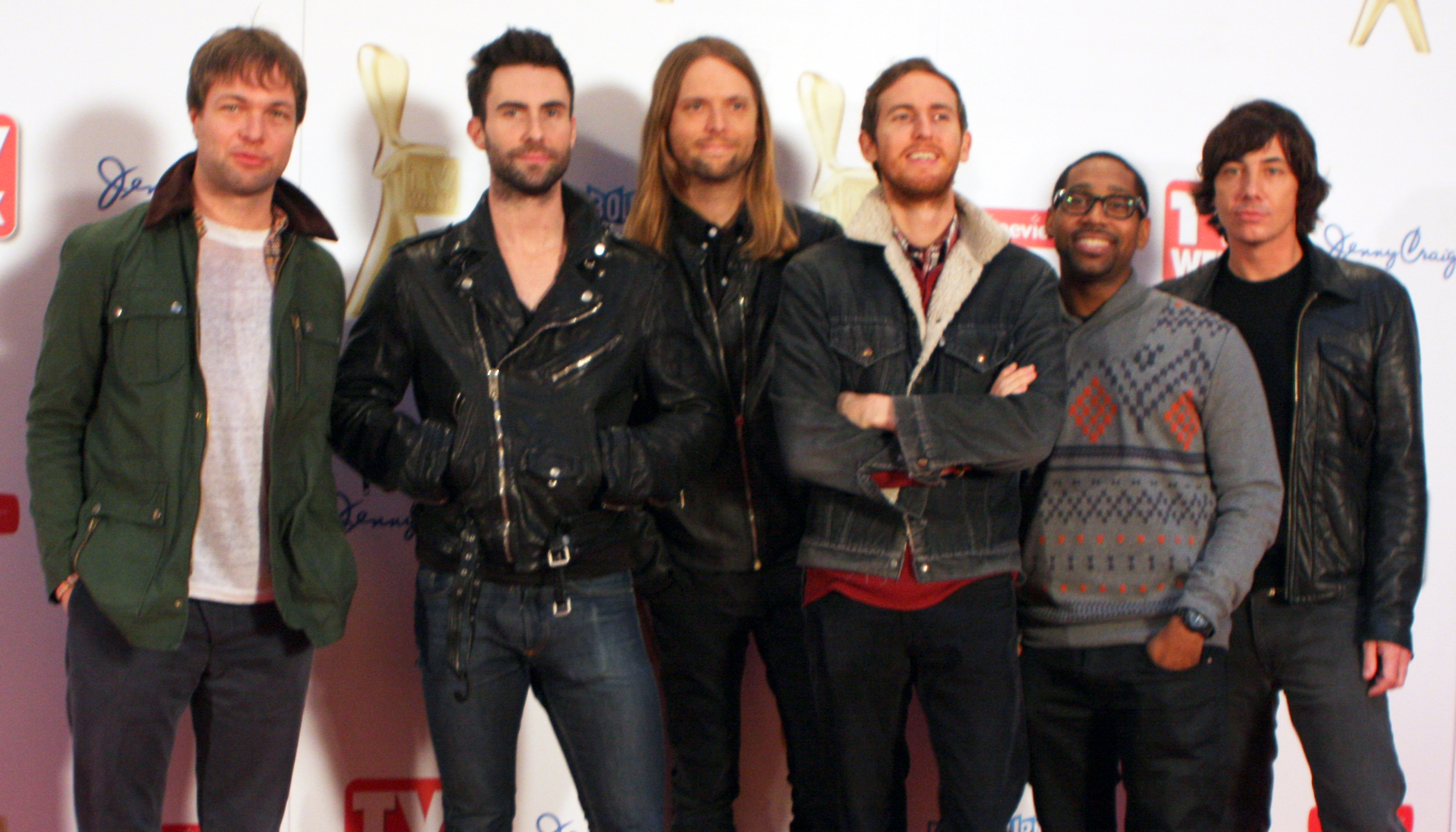
Sometime Last Night was compared to pop rock bands The 1975 and Maroon 5

Sometime Last Night received positive reviews from critics. Although most of them were positive towards the mature sound of the album, some criticized their lack of identity as a band. Jamey Beth from Breakaway Daily said "Sometime Last Night [is] a selection of arena-sized pop songs shot through with gorgeously crafted melodies, electrifying harmonies, and lyrics culled from real-life stories the band's been through over the past few years." Martha Segovia from Confront Magazine rated the album 3 1/2 stars out of five. She wrote: "Overall, the album is produced in a way that accurately states how the band has developed and [...] [they] offer an easy-listening experience that has your head bopping along to each track, and singing along contently." Comparing it to 2013's Louder, Tim Senda from Allmusic said that "Sometime Last Night doesn't get bogged down in soggy ballads, but instead deals in chipper, big-chorused midtempo pop." He also praised the band's songwriting and Ross and Riker's vocals. Finally, Senda rated Sometime Last Night 3 and a half out of five.

Sometime Last Night debuted at number 6 on the Billboard 200 chart dated August 1, selling 31,000 units in the week ending July 16. It became the highest-charting album for the group so far.

== Singles ==
"Smile" was released as the lead single from Sometime Last Night on November 14, 2014. Despite not being a commercial success, the song was met with positive reviews from critics. "Let's Not Be Alone Tonight" became the sophomore single off the album on February 13, 2015 and it was the first sent to mainstream radio. "All Night" was released as the third single on June 2, along with the album's iTunes pre-order. "I Know You Got Away" was released as the fourth single on October 16. "Dark Side" was released as the fifth single on February 1, 2016. "F.E.E.L. G.O.O.D." was released on June 14, 2016.

== Tour ==
Sometime Last Night was further promoted with a world tour, the Sometime Last Night Tour.

== Track listing ==
| No. | Title | Writer(s) | Producer(s) | Length |
|---|---|---|---|---|
| 1. | "All Night" | Ben Berger; Ross Lynch; Rocky Lynch; Ryan McMahon; Ryan Rabin; Ellington Ratliff | Captain Cuts | 3:43 |
| 2. | "Wild Hearts" | Jonas Jeberg; Clarence Coffee Jr.; Kenji Chan; Mike Del Rio | Jeberg | 4:03 |
| 3. | "Dark Side" | Rocky Lynch; Ross Lynch; Riker Lynch; Ratliff | Matt Wallace; Rocky Lynch | 3:07 |
| 4. | "Let's Not Be Alone Tonight" | Savan Kotecha; Kristian Lundin; Carl Falk; Johan Carlsson | Falk; Kristian Lundin | 2:55 |
| 5. | "Repeating Days" | Ross Lynch; Riker Lynch; Rocky Lynch | Wallace; Rocky Lynch | 5:40 |
| 6. | "Smile" | Leah Haywood; Daniel James; Brian Lee; Matt Thiessen | Dreamlab; Brian Lee | 3:21 |
| 7. | "Lightning Strikes" | Emanuel Kiriakou; E. Kidd Bogart; Andrew Goldstein; Rydel Lynch; Ratliff; Rocky Lynch; Riker Lynch; Ross Lynch | Jens Koerkemeier; Goldstein; Kiriakou | 3:30 |
| 8. | "F.E.E.L.G.O.O.D." | Rocky Lynch; Ratliff; Riker Lynch; Rydel Lynch; Ross Lynch | M. Wallace; Rocky Lynch | 3:46 |
| 9. | "I Know You Got Away" | Rocky Lynch; Ross Lynch; Ratliff; Riker Lynch | M. Wallace; Rocky Lynch | 3:19 |
| 10. | "Do It Again" | Mitch Allan; Dan Book; Alexei Misoul; Riker Lynch; Rocky Lynch; Jason Evigan | Allan; Book | 3:40 |
| 11. | "Did You Have Your Fun?" | Cameron Forbes Lewis; Rocky Lynch; Ross Lynch; Ratliff | M. Wallace; Rocky Lynch | 3:14 |
| Total length: | | | | 40:17 |

North America iTunes Store edition bonus tracks
| No. | Title | Writer(s) | Producer(s) | Length |
|---|---|---|---|---|
| 12. | "Doctor, Doctor" | Josh Abrahams; Oliver Goldstein; Sam Hollander; Joshua Moran | Abrahams; Oligee | 3:09 |
| 13. | "What You're Missing" | Ryan Gillmor; Michelle Lewis; Kurt Hugo Schneider; Aaron Sterling | Lewis | 3:56 |
| Total length: | | | | 47:22 |

North America Target edition bonus tracks
| No. | Title | Writer(s) | Producer(s) | Length |
|---|---|---|---|---|
| 12. | "I Can't Say I'm in Love" | Ross Lynch; Allan; Nathanael Boone; Riker Lynch; Rocky Lynch | Allan | 3:42 |
| 13. | "Could Have Been Mine" | Rocky Lynch; Riker Lynch; Boone | Rocky Lynch; Travis "Tronik" Huff; Mike Daly | 4:05 |
| Total length: | | | | 48:04 |

Japan edition bonus tracks
| No. | Title | Writer(s) | Producer(s) | Length |
|---|---|---|---|---|
| 12. | "Doctor, Doctor" | Abrahams; O. Goldstein; Hollander; Moran | Abrahams; Oligee | 3:09 |
| 13. | "What You're Missing" | Gillmor; Lewis; Schneider; Sterling | Lewis | 3:56 |
| 14. | "We're Alright" | Christopher J. Baran; Riker Lynch; Rocky Lynch | Baran | 2:58 |
| Total length: | | | | 50:20 |

International special edition bonus tracks
| No. | Title | Writer(s) | Producer(s) | Length |
|---|---|---|---|---|
| 12. | "Doctor, Doctor" | Abrahams; O. Goldstein; Hollander; Moran | Abrahams; Oligee | 3:09 |
| 13. | "I Can't Say I'm in Love" | Ross Lynch; Allan; Boone; Riker Lynch; Rocky Lynch | Allan | 3:42 |
| 14. | "Heart Made Up on You" | Jess Cates; Dan Ostebo; Jordan Mohilowski; Kiriakou; Bogart; A. Goldstein; Cameron Forbes | Kiriakou; A. Goldstein; Mohilowski | 3:01 |
| 15. | "Things Are Looking Up" | Cates; Kiriakou; Bogart | Kiriakou; Goldstein; Cates | 3:05 |
| 16. | "Easy Love" | Chris Wallace; Matt Rodosevich; Andy Grammer; Riker Lynch; Rocky Lynch; Ross Lynch; Ratliff; Rydel Lynch | Matt Rad | 3:53 |
| 17. | "Stay with Me" | Haywood; James; Rob Ellmore | Dreamlab; Ruffian | 3:20 |
| 18. | "Nine Lives" | Allan; Julia Michaels; Ross Lynch; Rocky Lynch | Allan | 3:23 |
| 19. | "Never Be the Same" | Kiriakou; Bogart; A. Goldstein; Lindy Robbins; Riker Lynch | Kiriakou; A. Goldstein | 2:54 |
| Total length: | | | | 66:44 |

Latin America special edition bonus track
| No. | Title | Writer(s) | Producer(s) | Length |
|---|---|---|---|---|
| 20. | "F.E.E.L.G.O.O.D." (featuring Belanova) | Rocky Lynch; Ratliff; Riker Lynch; Rydel Lynch; Ross Lynch | M. Wallace; Rocky Lynch | 3:46 |
| Total length: | | | | 70:30 |

== Charts ==
| Chart (2015) | Peak position |
|---|---|
| Argentine Albums (CAPIF) | 20 |
| Australian Albums (ARIA) | 19 |
| Belgian Albums (Ultratop Flanders) | 70 |
| Belgian Albums (Ultratop Wallonia) | 107 |
| Canadian Albums (Billboard) | 12 |
| French Albums (SNEP) | 118 |
| Dutch Albums (Album Top 100) | 76 |
| Irish Albums (IRMA) | 55 |
| Italian Albums (FIMI) | 16 |
| New Zealand Albums (RMNZ) | 36 |
| Norwegian Albums (VG-lista) | 16 |
| Polish Albums (ZPAV) | 32 |
| Portuguese Albums (AFP) | 2 |
| Scottish Albums (Official Charts) | 52 |
| Spanish Albums (Promusicae) | 5 |
| UK Albums (Official Charts) | 73 |
| UK Album Downloads (Official Charts) | 43 |
| US Billboard 200 | 6 |
