= New Addictions =

EP by R5
- Released: May 12, 2017
- Recorded: 2016
- Genres: Funk-pop; power pop
- Length: 15:59
- Label: Hollywood
- Producers: Dreamlab; Rocky Lynch; Ross Lynch; Pete Nappi; Ruffian

R5 chronology
| Sometime Last Night (2015) | New Addictions (2017) |

Singles from New Addictions
- 1. "If" Released: May 12, 2017; 2. "Hurts Good" Released: September 21, 2017

New Addictions is the fourth and final EP by American pop rock band R5. It was released on May 12, 2017, through Hollywood Records.

== Background ==
The band announced the release of the EP on April 5, 2017, via Twitter along a two-date pre-release show on April 27, 2017, at Los Angeles and May 11, 2017, on New York City respectively. The album was almost entirely produced by band member Rocky Lynch.

== Promotion ==
The band announced the New Addictions Tour to promote the EP, with the first leg set to start on June 24, 2017, in Denver, Colorado. The same day the EP was released, a music video for the song "If", directed by Michel Borden, was released via Vevo. It was filmed in San Diego and inspired by the films Risky Business, Pulp Fiction, Boogie Nights, Fear and Loathing in Las Vegas and Goodfellas.

== Reception ==
Rolling Stone called the EP "full of sharply constructed pop confections that ride galloping basslines."

== Track listing ==
Credits taken from Qobuz.

| No. | Title | Writer(s) | Producer(s) | Length |
|---|---|---|---|---|
| 1. | "If" | Riker Lynch; Rocky Lynch; Ross Lynch; Ellington Ratliff | Rocky Lynch | 3:11 |
| 2. | "Red Velvet" (featuring New Beat Fund) | Jeffrey Scott Laliberte; Riker Lynch; Rocky Lynch; Ross Lynch; Ratliff | Rocky Lynch; Pete Nappi | 3:07 |
| 3. | "Lay Your Head Down" | Riker Lynch; Rocky Lynch; Ross Lynch; Ratliff | Rocky Lynch; Nappi | 3:35 |
| 4. | "Trading Time" | Riker Lynch; Rocky Lynch; Ross Lynch; Nappi; Ratliff; Ethan Thompson | Rocky Lynch; Nappi | 3:08 |
| 5. | "Need You Tonight" | Andrew Farriss | Dreamlab; Ruffian^{[a]} | 2:58 |
| 6. | "Hurts Good" | Rocky Lynch; Ross Lynch; Ellington Ratliff | Rocky Lynch; Nappi | 3:42 |
| Total length: | | | | 15:59 |

== Charts ==
| Chart (2017) | Peak position |
|---|---|
| New Zealand Heatseekers Albums (RMNZ) | 6 |
| Spanish Albums (PROMUSICAE) | 91 |

== Release history ==
| Country | Date | Format | Label |
|---|---|---|---|
| Worldwide | May 12, 2017 | Digital download | Hollywood |
| United States | September 15, 2017 | CD | Hollywood |
| United Kingdom | September 22, 2017 | CD | Hollywood |
