= Live at the Greek =

Live at the Greek may refer to:

- Live at the Greek (Jimmy Page and The Black Crowes album), an album by Jimmy Page and the Black Crowes released in 2000 and reissued in 2025
- Live at the Greek, an album released by Josh Groban in 2004
- Live at the Greek (The Driver Era album), an album released by the Driver Era in 2023

== See also ==
- Love at the Greek, a 1977 album by Neil Diamond
- Live at the Greek Theatre (disambiguation)
