= Touch (The Driver Era song) =

2024 single by the Driver Era

Single by the Driver Era

from the album Obsession
- Released: December 17, 2024
- Length: 2:48
- Label: TOO
- Songwriters: Ellington Ratliff; Ross Lynch; Rocky Lynch
- Producers: Ross Lynch; Rocky Lynch

The Driver Era singles chronology
"Don't Walk Away" (2024)	"Touch" (2024)	"Same Old Story" (2025)

Lyric video
- "Touch" on YouTube

"Touch" is a song by American duo the Driver Era. It was released as the third single from their upcoming fourth studio album, Obsession, on December 17, 2024.

== Background and release ==
On September 4, 2024, The Driver Era released a new song, "You Keep Me Up at Night", which served as the lead single for the upcoming album, titled Obsession. On October 23, 2024, the band released "Don't Walk Away" as the second single from the album.

"Touch" was released on December 17, 2024, serving as the third single from the album.

== Reception ==
The single was described by Dom Vigil from Prelude Press as having a "dark, ambient bass that serves as a moody backdrop for Ross’ playful vocals".

== Credits and personnel ==
- Ross Lynch – vocals, songwriting, production
- Rocky Lynch – vocals, songwriting, production
- Ellington Ratliff – songwriting

== Release history ==
Release history for "Touch"
Region	Date	Format	Label	Ref.
Various	December 17, 2024	Digital download; streaming	TOO Records	
