= Heart Made Up on You =

EP by R5
- Released: July 22, 2014
- Recorded: 2014
- Genre: Dance-pop
- Length: 13:19
- Label: Hollywood
- Producer: Emanuel Kiriakou; Andrew Goldstein; Jordan Mohilowski; Brigitte Guitart; Matt Rad; Dreamlab; Ruffian; Jess Cates

R5 chronology
Live in London (2014)	Heart Made Up on You (2014)	Sometime Last Night (2015)

Singles from Heart Made Up on You
- 1. "Heart Made Up on You" Released: July 21, 2014

Heart Made Up on You is the third EP by American pop rock band R5. It was released on July 22, 2014, through Hollywood Records. Musically, the EP was described as dance-pop with EDM elements.

== Background ==
The band described Heart Made Up on You as a "first taste" of their upcoming second studio album, which was scheduled to be released in early 2015. However, due to further production and revisions, Ross Lynch announced in a radio interview that the band has decided these songs will not appear on the album, because they wanted a "blank slate".

== Reception ==
Rachel Ho of Musichel, praised the band for creating "a sound indigenous to R5". She also added that "with Heart Made Up on You, R5 have once again evinced that they have the magical music touch that will continue taking them to the top." Vivian Pham of Popdust gave the album a rating of 4 out of 5 stars, saying that "R5 always leaves us wanting more." Verity Magazine's Nikole Renee said that the EP "shows a definite growth".

== Track listing ==
Heart Made Up on You track listing
No.	Title	Writer(s)	Producer(s)	Length
1.	"Heart Made Up on You"	Jess Cates; Dan Ostebo; Jordan Mohilowski; Emanuel Kiriakou; Evan "Kidd" Bogart; Andrew Goldstein; Cameron Forbes	Kiriakou; Goldstein; Mohilowski	3:01
2.	"Things Are Looking Up"	Cates; Kiriakou; Bogart	Kiriakou; Goldstein; Cates	3:05
3.	"Easy Love"	Chris Wallace; Matt Rodosevich; Andy Grammer; Riker Lynch; Rocky Lynch; Ross Lynch; Ellington Ratliff; Rydel Lynch	Matt Rad	3:53
4.	"Stay with Me"	Leah Haywood; Daniel James; Rob Ellmore	Dreamlab; Ruffian	3:20
Total length:				13:13

== Charts ==
Chart performance for Heart Made Up on You
Chart (2014)	Peak position
Polish Albums (ZPAV)	19
US Billboard 200	36

== Release history ==
Release history and formats for Heart Made Up on You
Country	Date	Format	Label
United States	July 22, 2014	Digital download	Hollywood
Canada	July 22, 2014	Digital download	Hollywood
