= All Night (R5 song) =

Single by R5

from the album Sometime Last Night
- Released: June 2, 2015
- Genre: Pop rock; power pop
- Length: 3:43
- Label: Hollywood
- Songwriters: Ben Berger; Ross Lynch; Rocky Lynch; Ryan McMahon; Ellington Ratliff; Ryan Rabin
- Producer: Captain Cuts

R5 singles chronology
"Let's Not Be Alone Tonight" (2015)	"All Night" (2015)	"I Know You Got Away" (2015)

"All Night" is a pop rock and power pop song by American pop rock band R5. It was released on June 2, 2015, as the third single from Sometime Last Night, along with the album's iTunes pre-order. The song was announced on May 28 as the album's opening track.

== Music video ==
The "All Night" music video was released on July 8, 2015. It was filmed solely in a club bathroom with several of R5's friends including brother DJ Ryland Lynch, Courtney Eaton, Collins Key, Allison Holker, Riker's partner from season 20 of Dancing with the Stars and actors Michael Rosenbaum and Alfonso Ribeiro.

== Reception ==
"All Night" received positive reviews from music blogs. Teen magazine Fanlala described it as "the perfect summer love song." A writer from Shine On Media said "All Night" has "the R5 sound but it also has an old school rock vibe which we love."
