= Malibu (The Driver Era song) =

2022 single by the Driver Era

Single by the Driver Era

from the album Summer Mixtape
- Released: July 28, 2022
- Length: 2:47
- Label: TOO
- Songwriters: Ross Lynch; Rocky Lynch; Griff Clawson
- Producers: Ross Lynch; Rocky Lynch; Griff Clawson

The Driver Era singles chronology
"Keep Moving Forward" (2022)	"Malibu" (2022)	"Fantasy" (2022)

Music video
- "Malibu" on YouTube

"Malibu" is a song by American duo the Driver Era. It was released as the second single from their third studio album, Summer Mixtape, on July 28, 2022.

== Background and release ==
'Malibu' is about reminiscing on experiences in the best locations [...] It’s about getting away. It’s the spontaneous trip you take with someone – maybe you knew them before, or maybe you’re meeting them for the first time.

— The Driver Era discussing the inspiration behind the track Malibu, via an interview.

On July 28, 2022, The Driver Era released a new song, "Malibu", which served as the second single for their third album, Summer Mixtape (2022). On August 5, 2022, the band announced their third album, and released the music video for "Malibu".

== Critical reception ==
Writing for the Official Charts Company, Carl Smith called the song a "delicious slice of summer from the outset", while noting its "exquisite funk guitar and dreamy echoes". He finished by saying the single marks a stylish departure from the band's previous works, but that it a "carefree piece of pop escapism" that encapsulates a pure sunshine.

V Magazine noted that the song features a "groovy dance" sound, that's different from the rest of songs on the album. Writing about the album, Summer Mixtape, the magazine thought that it "curate the sunny, carefree summer vibe they envisioned for their next era".

== Track listing ==
Digital download and streaming

1. "Malibu" – 2:47

Digital download and streaming (Friend Within Remix)

1. "Malibu" (Friend Within Remix) – 3:04

Digital download and streaming (Deepend Remix)

1. "Malibu" (Deepend Remix) – 2:38

== Credits and personnel ==
- Ross Lynch – vocals, songwriting, production
- Rocky Lynch – vocals, songwriting, production
- Griff Clawson – songwriting, production

== Release history ==
Release history for "Malibu"
Region	Date	Type	Format	Label	Ref.
Various	July 28, 2022	Original	Digital download; streaming	TOO Records	
Various	January 27, 2023	Deepend Remix	Digital download; streaming	TOO Records	
