= Status Update =

2018 American teen romantic comedy film

- Theatrical release poster
- Directed by: Scott Speer
- Written by: Jason Filardi
- Produced by: Jennifer Gibgot; Adam Shankman; Dominic Rustam; Shawn Williamson
- Starring: Ross Lynch; Olivia Holt
- Cinematography: Russ T. Alsobrook
- Edited by: Sean Valla
- Music by: Jeff Cardoni
- Production companies: Offspring Entertainment; Brightlight Pictures; Voltage Pictures
- Distributed by: Vertical Entertainment
- Release date: March 23, 2018
- Running time: 106 minutes
- Country: United States
- Language: English

Status Update is a 2018 American teen romantic comedy film directed by Scott Speer and written by Jason Filardi. It stars longtime Disney Channel actors Ross Lynch and Olivia Holt.

The film had a limited release on March 23, 2018, before being released through video on demand on March 30, 2018, by Vertical Entertainment.

== Premise ==
A not-so-popular high schooler named Kyle Moore is uprooted by his parents' separation and struggles to fit into his new hometown. Then he stumbles upon a magical app that causes his social media updates to come true, which brings all of his wildest real-world fantasies to life.

== Cast ==
- Ross Lynch as Kyle Moore
- Olivia Holt as Dani McKenzie
- Courtney Eaton as Charlotte Alden
- Diana Bang as Principal Kim
- Martin Donovan as Mr. Alden
- Harvey Guillen as Lonnie Gregory
- Gregg Sulkin as Derek Lowe
- Brec Bassinger as Maxie Moore
- Alexandra Siegel as Ms. Wescott
- Rob Riggle as Darryl Moore
- Famke Janssen as Katherine Alden
- John Michael Higgins as Mr. Moody
- Wendi McLendon-Covey as Ann Moore
- Josh Ostrovsky as Bearded Guy

== Production ==
In November 2014, The Hollywood Reporter announced that Ross Lynch would star in a new supernatural/comedy/romance film called Status Update, set in New England. Legendary's Asylum Entertainment bought the pitch from 17 Again writer Jason Filardi. Offspring Entertainment's Jennifer Gibgot and Adam Shankman produced with Voltage's Dominic Rustam and Brightlight's Shawn Williamson. Scott Speer directed the film. The film went into production in Vancouver, British Columbia in June 2016.

== Release ==
Status Update had a limited release on March 23, 2018, before being released through video on demand on March 30, 2018, by Vertical Entertainment.
