= Don't Walk Away (The Driver Era song) =

2024 single by the Driver Era

Single by the Driver Era

from the album Obsession
- Released: October 23, 2024
- Length: 2:32
- Label: TOO
- Songwriters: Ellington Ratliff; Ross Lynch; Rocky Lynch; Morgan Taylor Reid
- Producer: Morgan Taylor Reid

The Driver Era singles chronology
"You Keep Me Up at Night" (2024)	"Don't Walk Away" (2024)	"Touch" (2024)

Lyric video
- "Don't Walk Away" on YouTube

"Don't Walk Away" is a song by American duo the Driver Era. It was released as the second single from their upcoming fourth studio album, Obsession, on October 23, 2024.

== Background and release ==
On September 4, 2024, The Driver Era released a new song, "You Keep Me Up at Night", which served as the lead single for the upcoming album, titled Obsession. On October 23, 2024, the band released "Don't Walk Away" as the second single from the album.

== Reception ==
The single was described by Josh Sharpe from BroadwayWorld as a groovy, upbeat song with confessional lyrics.

== Credits and personnel ==
- Ross Lynch – vocals, songwriting
- Rocky Lynch – vocals, songwriting
- Ellington Ratliff – songwriting
- Morgan Taylor Reid – songwriting, production

== Release history ==
Release history for "Don't Walk Away"
Region	Date	Format	Label	Ref.
Various	October 23, 2024	Digital download; streaming	TOO Records	
