= Rumors (The Driver Era song) =

2023 single by the Driver Era

Single by the Driver Era
- Released: October 20, 2023
- Length: 3:22
- Label: TOO
- Songwriters: Ross Lynch; Rocky Lynch; Ellington Ratliff; Morgan Taylor Reid
- Producers: Ross Lynch; Rocky Lynch; Reid; Chris Behringer

The Driver Era singles chronology
"Fantasy" (2022)	"Rumors" (2023)	"Get Off My Phone" (2024)

Music video
- "Rumors" on YouTube

"Rumors" is a song by American duo the Driver Era. It was released on October 20, 2023, through TOO Records.

== Background and release ==
On September 16, 2022, the band released their third studio album, Summer Mixtape, through TOO Records. On July 21, 2023, "Fantasy" was released as the third and final single from the album.

On October 20, 2023, The Driver Era released the single. The single release came after lead singer Ross Lynch guess appeared in Troye Sivan's viral video for his single "One of Your Girls", taken from the Sivan's third studio album, Something to Give Each Other (2023).

On November 16, 2023, they released the music video for the song.

== Critical reception ==
Hannah Gadd of Red Brick called the song a "perfect extension of their quintessential sound whilst also showcasing a new side to the American music-duo’s sonic".

== Credits and personnel ==
- Ross Lynch – vocals, songwriting, production
- Rocky Lynch – vocals, songwriting, production
- Morgan Taylor Reid – songwriting, production
- Ellington Ratliff – songwriting
- Chris Behringer – production

== Release history ==
Release history for "Rumors"
Region	Date	Format	Label	Ref.
Various	October 20, 2023	Digital download; streaming	TOO Records	
