= Live at the Greek Theatre =

Live at the Greek Theatre may refer to:

- Chicago & Earth, Wind & Fire – Live at the Greek Theatre, 2005
- Live at the Greek Theater, a live DVD by Il Divo, 2006
- Live at the Greek Theatre, an album by Flogging Molly, 2010
- Live at the Greek Theatre 2008, a DVD by Ringo Starr, 2010
- Live at the Greek Theatre, an album by Joe Bonamassa, 2016

== See also ==
- Live at the Greek (disambiguation)
