= Girlfriend (The Driver Era album) =

2021 studio album by The Driver Era

Studio album by the Driver Era
- Released: October 15, 2021
- Genres: Alternative rock; pop rock
- Length: 51:53
- Labels: TOO Records; BMG
- Producers: Rocky Lynch; Ross Lynch

The Driver Era chronology
X (2019)	Girlfriend (2021)	Summer Mixtape (2022)

Singles from Girlfriend
- 1. "A Kiss / Forever Always" Released: October 25, 2019; 2. "OMG Plz Don't Come Around / Flashdrive" Released: April 2, 2020; 3. "Take Me Away" Released: July 10, 2020; 4. "Places" Released: August 7, 2020; 5. "Fade" Released: September 25, 2020; 6. "Heaven Angel" Released: July 9, 2021; 7. "#1 Fan" Released: August 13, 2021; 8. "Leave Me Feeling Confident" Released: September 27, 2021

Girlfriend is the second studio album from American music duo the Driver Era, released on October 15, 2021, by BMG and TOO Records. It serves as a follow up to their debut album, X, released in 2019.

The album was preceded by the release of ten singles: "A Kiss" with "Forever Always", "OMG Plz Don't Come Around" with "Flashdrive", "Take Me Away", "Places", "Fade", "Heaven Angel", "#1 Fan" and "Leave Me Feeling Confident".

Girlfriend was met with mixed to positive reception from critics, who complimented the album's vibe. Commercially, the album charted on the UK Independent Album Breakers Chart, The Driver Era's first entry on an official chart globally.

In 2022, The Driver Era embarked on a concert tour, The Girlfriend Tour, which ran for 25 shows across the US and Europe.

To further promote the album, as well as the band's discography the band will embark on another tour, X Girlfriend Tour, which is set to start on September 14, 2024, and end on October 27, 2024, across Europe, and consiste of a total of 25 shows.

== Background and promotion ==
What’s exciting about these songs is that they all have different creation times, in that some of them have been in the process for a year or two and some of them we just started making a few months ago [...] We didn’t just sit down and start making the album right here, right now. The songs all came from different points in our lives.

— Ross Lynch on developing Girlfriend, via interview for SPIN.

On October 25, 2019, The Driver Era released the conjoined lead singles, "A Kiss" and "Forever Always".

On April 2, 2020, the band released another conjoined singles "OMG Plz Don’t Come Around" and "Flashdrive", from their then-upcoming second album, at the time expected to be released in the late summer 2020, which would later be delayed primarily due to the COVID-19 pandemic, which held back on the band's promotional schedule. The brothers then co-wrote and produced Girlfriend in their home studio, and it includes songs that were created since 2016.

On April 23, 2021, during a YouTube Live dedicated to MTV Friday Livestream's first birthday, The Driver Era announced their next single "Heaven Angel", to be released within the following month. Weeks later, the band released "#1 Fan" and "Leave Me Feeling Confident" before finally announcing and releasing their sophomore album Girlfriend. The album was followed by "The Girlfriend Tour" with concerts in the US, Asia, Australia and Europe both in 2021 and 2022.

== Critical reception ==
Professional ratings
Review scores
Source	Rating
DIY	3/5 stars
Dork	3/5 stars

Girlfriend received mixed to positive reviews from critics. Bella Martin of DIY wrote that the record "possesses a slinky line in R&B-tinged, ‘80s-indebted pop", while noting that it felt a "little too two-dimensional" at times. Dork's Stephen Ackroyd called it a "textured, smart modern pop rock record" and added that, although sometimes the album feels a little slick, the band "remain firmly heading in the right direction".

== Commercial performance ==
The album debuted at number eighteen on the UK Independent Album Breakers Chart, marking the band's first entry on any official charts across the world. This was the only chart in which Girlfriend appeared.

== Track listing ==
All tracks are written and produced by Rocky Lynch and Ross Lynch, except where noted.

Girlfriend – Disc one
No.	Title	Writer(s)	Length
1.	"Heart of Mine"		4:24
2.	"Cray Z Babe E"		3:13
3.	"Leave Me Feeling Confident"		3:49
4.	"Beautiful Girl"		3:04
5.	"#1 Fan"		3:06
6.	"Heaven Angel"		3:39
7.	"When You Need a Man"	Rocky Lynch; Ross Lynch; Nathanael Anderson	3:27
Total length:			24:42

Girlfriend – Disc two
No.	Title	Writer(s)	Length
1.	"Plz Don't Come Around Interlude"		1:10
2.	"OMG Plz Don't Come Around"		3:49
3.	"Places"		3:19
4.	"A Kiss"	Rocky Lynch; Ross Lynch; Ellington Ratliff; Brigitte Guitart	4:32
5.	"Fade"		4:00
6.	"Flashdrive"		3:33
7.	"Take Me Away"		3:24
8.	"Forever Always"		3:18
Total length:			27:26

Notes

- "Cray Z Babe E" and "Flashdrive" are stylized in all lowercase.
- "Plz Don't Come Around Interlude" is stylized in sentence case.

== Personnel ==
Credits are adapted from the album's liner notes.

=== The Driver Era ===
- Ross Lynch – vocals, drum programming, guitar, bass
- Rocky Lynch – vocals, drum programming, guitar, bass

=== Technical ===
- Phil Tan – mixing (1–10, 13, 14)
- Erik Madrid – mixing (11, 15)
- Aaron Mattes – mixing assistance (11, 15)
- Bill Zimmerman – mixing assistance (1–10, 13, 14)
- Julio Rodriguez Sangrador – mixing, mastering (12)
- Colin Leonard – mastering
- Michelle Mancini – mastering

== Charts ==
Weekly chart performance for Girlfriend
Chart (2021)	Peak position
UK Independent Album Breakers (OCC)	18

== Release history ==
Girlfriend release history
Region	Date	Format(s)	Label	Ref.
Various	October 15, 2021	CD; digital download; streaming; vinyl LP	BMG	
