= X (The Driver Era album) =

2019 studio album by The Driver Era

Studio album by the Driver Era
- Released: June 28, 2019
- Genre: Alternative rock
- Length: 35:43
- Labels: TOO Records; BMG
- Producer: Rocky Lynch

The Driver Era chronology
X (2019)	Girlfriend (2021)

Singles from X
- 1. "Preacher Man" Released: March 16, 2018; 2. "Afterglow" Released: August 24, 2018; 3. "Low" Released: October 26, 2018; 4. "Feel You Now" Released: March 29, 2019; 5. "Welcome to the End of Your Life" Released: April 26, 2019

X is the debut studio album from American music duo the Driver Era, released on June 28, 2019, by BMG and TOO Records.

The album was preceded by the release of five singles: "Preacher Man", "Afterglow", "Low", "Feel You Now" and "Welcome to the End of Your Life".

To promote the album, the band embarked a concert tour, The Driver Era Live!, which spanned 22 shows across the United States from March 13 to August 11, 2019. To further promote the album, as well as the band's discography they embarked on another tour, X Girlfriend Tour, from September 14 to October 27, 2024, across Europe, and consisted of a total of 25 shows.

== Background ==
Most of the time we are talking about something we want to achieve or a vision we have or a song we want to write. Or otherwise contemplating. We are always talking about big concepts and trying to figure out how to enjoy the most we can.

— Ross Lynch on developing X, via interview for Forbes.

Brothers Rocky and Ross Lynch had previously been making music together for some time alongside their other siblings, as part of the now defunct pop rock band R5. On March 1, 2018, R5's Instagram and Twitter accounts were changed to the Driver Era, with all previous posts removed. The same day, the band released previews of their first single "Preacher Man", which was later released on March 16, 2018.

On August 24, 2018, the Driver Era released their next single, "Afterglow", first made available on their YouTube channel before eventually being put onto Spotify. Their third single, "Low", was released on October 26, 2018.

On March 10, 2019, the Driver Era released a video titled "Haven't Left the Garage", which included snippets of several upcoming tracks from the album that they would perform on tour. The fourth single from the album, "Feel You Now", was released on March 29, 2019 after being previously teased, with a music video released three weeks later on April 17, 2019. The final single from the album, "Welcome to the End of Your Life", was released on April 26, 2019, with a music video released shortly after. On June 13, 2019, the Driver Era released a music video for the track "Low", as well as announcing the title of their debut studio album, X. The album was released on June 28, 2019.

An extended play featuring remixes of various tracks from the album, titled Some Remixes of X, was released on January 10, 2020.

== Critical reception ==
X received generally positive reviews from music critics. Kelly McCafferty Dorogy, writing for Atwood Magazine, described the album as "a graduation from their early years in the mega pop group R5", finding the group's blending of soul, funk, pop, and rock genres as providing depth to each track. Honor Cockroft of The London Centrist compared the album to an "at-home concert", praising Rocky's production and Ross's vocal talent.

== Track listing ==
All tracks are produced by Rocky Lynch, except where noted.

X track listing
No.	Title	Writer(s)	Producer(s)	Length
1.	"Welcome to the End of Your Life"	Ross Lynch; Rocky Lynch		3:23
2.	"Nobody Knows"	Ross Lynch; Rocky Lynch; Ellington Ratliff		3:30
3.	"Scared of Heights"	Ross Lynch; Rocky Lynch		3:52
4.	"Feel You Now"	Ross Lynch; Rocky Lynch; Ratliff; Brigitte Guitart		4:18
5.	"San Francisco"	Ross Lynch; Rocky Lynch; Ratliff		3:39
6.	"Low"	Rocky Lynch		3:30
7.	"Giveuwhatuwant"	Ross Lynch; Rocky Lynch		3:20
8.	"Natural"	Ross Lynch; Rocky Lynch; Ratliff; Morgan Reid	Ross Lynch; Rocky Lynch; Reid	3:16
9.	"Afterglow"	Ross Lynch; Rocky Lynch; Brigitte Guitart		3:11
10.	"Preacher Man"	Julian Bunetta; Edward Drewett; Gamal Lewis; Jacob Kasher Hindlin; John Henry Ryan; Brigitte Guitart	Bunetta; Andrew Haas; Ian Franzino	3:39
Total length:				35:43

Some Remixes of X - EP track listing
No.	Title	Writer(s)	Producer(s)	Length
1.	"Feel You Now" (Ellington Remix)	Ross Lynch; Rocky Lynch; Ratliff	Ross Lynch; Rocky Lynch; Ratliff^{[a]}	3:19
2.	"Natural" (Moontower Remix)	Ross Lynch; Rocky Lynch; Ratliff; Reid	Ross Lynch; Rocky Lynch; Reid; Moontower^{[a]}	2:27
3.	"Nobody Knows Reprise"	Ross Lynch; Rocky Lynch; Ratliff		2:43
4.	"Low" (The Fund Remix)	Rocky Lynch	Ross Lynch; Rocky Lynch; Jeff Laliberte^{[a]}; Paul Laliberte^{[a]}; Shelby Archer^{[a]}	3:52
5.	"Preacher Man" (Rocky Remix)	Bunetta; Drewett; Lewis; Hindlin; Ryan	Bunetta; Haas; Franzino	3:47
6.	"Scared of Heights" (Pete Nappi Remix)	Ross Lynch; Rocky Lynch	Ross Lynch; Rocky Lynch; Peter Nappi^{[a]}	2:52
Total length:				19:02

Notes

- ^{^[a]} signifies an additional producer
- "Giveuwhatuwant" is stylized in all lowercase.

== Personnel ==
Credits are adapted from the AllMusic.

=== The Driver Era ===
- Ross Lynch – composition, vocals, guitar, background vocals
- Rocky Lynch – composition, engineering, production, vocals, guitar

=== Technical ===
- Andrew Haas – engineering, production
- Bridgette Bryant – background vocals
- Chris Gehringer – engineering
- Damien Lewis – engineering
- Ed Drewett – composition
- Ellington Ratliff – composition
- Erik Madrid – engineering
- Gamal Lewis – composition
- Gavin Lurssen – engineering
- Ian Franzino – engineering, production
- Jacob Kasher Hindlin – composition
- John Hanes – engineering
- John Ryan – composition
- Julian Bunetta – composition, engineering, production, programming, background vocals
- Maxayn Lewis – background vocals
- Morgan Reid – composition, engineering, production
- Phil Tan – engineering
- Serban Ghenea – engineering

== Release history ==
X release history
Region	Date	Format(s)	Label	Ref.
Various	June 28, 2019	digital download; streaming	BMG; TOO Records	

Some Remixes of X - EP release history
Region	Date	Format(s)	Label	Ref.
Various	January 10, 2020	digital download; streaming	BMG; TOO Records	
