= Get Off My Phone =

2024 single by the Driver Era

Single by the Driver Era
- Released: February 22, 2024
- Length: 2:48
- Label: TOO
- Songwriters: Ross Lynch; Rocky Lynch; Kevin Bard
- Producers: Ross Lynch; Rocky Lynch; Bard

The Driver Era singles chronology
"Rumors" (2023)	"Get Off My Phone" (2024)	"You Keep Me Up at Night" (2024)

Music video
- "Get Off My Phone" on YouTube

"Get Off My Phone" is a song by American duo the Driver Era. It was released on February 22, 2024, through TOO Records.

== Background and release ==
It's about the modern dilemma that people experience [...] When someone's no longer in their life, a lot of people have the temptation to go and see what someone's up to on social media.

— Ross Lynch discussing the lyrics of "Get Off My Phone", via an interview for Consequence's podcast, Kyle Meredith with The Drive Era.

On September 16, 2022, the band released their third studio album, Summer Mixtape, through TOO Records. On July 21, 2023, "Fantasy" was released as the third and final single from the album.

On October 20, 2023, The Driver Era released the single "Rumors". The single release came after lead singer Ross Lynch guess appeared in Troye Sivan's viral video for his single "One of Your Girls", taken from the Sivan's third studio album, Something to Give Each Other (2023).

The single was released on February 22, 2024. On March 6, 2024, the band released the official music video for the song.

== Critical reception ==
Teguan Harris of The Indiependent wrote that the single is an "exceptional song about heartbreak and anguish in the digital age and a new perspective on how haunting heartache can be" and that it is a "magnificent catalyst for [The Driver Era's] year in music".

== Track listing ==
Digital download and streaming

1. "Get Off My Phone" – 2:48

Digital download and streaming (Brooklyn Sessions)

1. "Get Off My Phone" (Brooklyn Sessions) – 3:04

== Credits and personnel ==
- Ross Lynch – vocals, songwriting, production
- Rocky Lynch – vocals, songwriting, production
- Morgan Taylor Reid – songwriting, production
- Kevin Bard – songwriting, production
- Ethan Carlson – mastering

== Release history ==
Release history for "Get Off My Phone"
Region	Date	Type	Format	Label	Ref.
Various	February 22, 2024	Original	Digital download; streaming	TOO Records	
Various	June 13, 2024	Brooklyn Sessions	Digital download; streaming	TOO Records	
