= Smile (R5 song) =

Single by R5

from the album Sometime Last Night
- Released: November 14, 2014
- Recorded: 2014
- Genre: Pop rock; power pop
- Length: 3:21
- Label: Hollywood
- Songwriter(s): Leah Haywood; Daniel James; Brian Lee; Matt Thiessen
- Producer(s): Dreamlab; Randall Bobbitt

R5 singles chronology
"Heart Made Up on You" (2014)	"Smile" (2014)	"Let's Not Be Alone Tonight" (2015)

"Smile" is a song by American pop rock band R5. It had its radio premiere on November 14, 2014, as the lead single from their second studio album, Sometime Last Night.

== Writing and composition ==
The song was written by Leah Haywood, Daniel James, Brian Lee and Matt Thiessen and produced by Dreamlab and Randall Bobbitt. The band's frontman, Ross Lynch, told Teen Magazine that the song was about "doing ridiculous things in order to make someone else smile" and "the simplicity of just happiness." "Smile" has a length of three minutes and twenty one seconds and sonically, "classic rock and roll" was the main inspiration of its sound. "Smile" was compared to Maroon 5 and Bruno Mars.

== Reception ==
"Smile" has received generally positive reviews. Bop and Tiger Beat magazine said the song was "sweet, catchy and great". Vivan Pham of Pop Dust noted that the band's sound has changed, no longer teen to become something more mature. She was positive and said it was "great". Raffy Ermac to Teen Magazine said "Smile" was the band's best song so far and they were "playing better than ever".

== Live performances ==
The first "Smile" performance was in the Family Channel special Family Day, in Canada, on November 16, 2014. On November 23, the band performed at the American Music Awards. On November 28, they performed on Good Morning America.

== Music video ==
On November 14, 2014, the band released a live video in Buenos Aires, Argentina, to promote the song. The official music video was premiered on MTV on December 23, 2014. MTV also released an exclusive interview and behind-the-scenes, entitled "What Makes R5 Smile?". The video shows the band backwards in a wooded park in four different scenes, like the four seasons. In the summer the band plays with water guns shirtless, in the spring they're on a picnic, in the autumn they dance in the rain among the dry leaves, in the winter they cut firewood in the snow.

== Release history ==
Country	Date	Format(s)	Label
United States	November 14, 2014	Radio premiere	Hollywood
Canada	November 14, 2014	Digital download	Hollywood
United States	November 14, 2014	Digital download	Hollywood
Australia	December 23, 2014	Digital download	Hollywood
Brazil	December 23, 2014	Digital download	Hollywood
Europe	December 23, 2014	Digital download	Hollywood
New Zealand	December 23, 2014	Digital download	Hollywood
