= You Keep Me Up at Night =

2024 single by the Driver Era

Single by the Driver Era

from the album Obsession
- Released: September 4, 2024
- Length: 2:18
- Label: TOO
- Songwriters: Ellington Ratliff; Ross Lynch; Rocky Lynch; Ryland Lynch
- Producers: Ross Lynch; Rocky Lynch

The Driver Era singles chronology
"Get Off My Phone" (2024)	"You Keep Me Up at Night" (2024)	"Don't Walk Away" (2024)

Music video
- "You Keep Me Up at Night" on YouTube

"You Keep Me Up at Night" is a song by American duo the Driver Era. It was released as the lead single from their upcoming fourth studio album, Obsession, on September 4, 2024.

== Background and release ==
On September 4, 2024, The Driver Era released a new song, "You Keep Me Up at Night", which served as the lead single for the upcoming album. The song was accompanied by a music video, released two weeks later.

== Live performances ==
The band performed the song during their concert at the O2 Apollo Manchester, on October 2, 2024, as part of their X Girlfriend Tour. The song is set to be included on the Obsession Tour set list.

== Credits and personnel ==
- Ross Lynch – vocals, songwriting, production
- Rocky Lynch – vocals, songwriting, production
- Ellington Ratliff – songwriting
- Ryland Lynch – songwriting

== Release history ==
Release history for "You Keep Me Up at Night"
Region	Date	Format	Label	Ref.
Various	September 4, 2024	Digital download; streaming	TOO Records	
