= Summer Mixtape =

2022 studio album by The Driver Era

Studio album by the Driver Era
- Released: September 16, 2022
- Genre: EDM; pop rock; reggae; synthpop
- Length: 29:17
- Label: TOO
- Producer: Rocky Lynch; Ross Lynch

The Driver Era chronology
Girlfriend (2021)	Summer Mixtape (2022)	Live at the Greek (2023)

Singles from Summer Mixtape
- 1. "Keep Moving Forward" Released: June 30, 2022; 2. "Malibu" Released: July 28, 2022; 3. "Fantasy" Released: September 16, 2022

Summer Mixtape is the third studio album from American music duo the Driver Era, released on September 16, 2022, by TOO Records. It serves as a follow up to their sophomore studio album, Girlfriend, released in 2021.

The album was promoted by the release of three singles: "Keep Moving Forward", which features American singer Nikka Costa, along with "Malibu" and "Fantasy".

The band embarked on a concert tour, Live On Tour '22, to promote the new songs. The tour ran for 57 cities across the US, Europe, Australia, New Zealand and Japan.

To further promote the album, as well as the band's discography the band embarked on another tour, X Girlfriend Tour, which started on September 14, 2024, and ended on October 27, 2024, across Europe, and consiste of a total of 25 shows.

== Background and promotion ==
The new music is eclectic [...] Honestly it’s a vulnerable thing releasing music. It doesn’t always feel great to be honest. But I like the music and I try to remember that at the end of the day it’s for the people that love it and if you don’t I don’t care.

– Ross Lynch on developing Summer Mixtape, via interview for Rolling Stone.

On June 30, 2022, The Driver Era released a new song, "Keep Moving Forward" featuring Nikka Costa, which served as the lead single for the then-upcoming album. "Malibu" was released on July 28, 2022, as the second single. On August 5, 2022, the band announced their third album, and released the music video for "Malibu".

On August 4, 2022, The Driver Era announced their third studio album, which was released on September 16, 2022. "Fantasy" was released as the third and final single from the album, on September 16, 2022.

== Critical reception ==
The album was met with positive reviews from critics. For Consequence, Mary Siroky wrote that the album was a "pleasantly hazy, indulgent, and sun-soaked listen" and that, because it was self-produced by the band, it gave them "space to experiment and play".

Writing for People, Daniela Avila stated that, unlike the indie approach of The Driver Era's previous record, Girlfriend, the band created the album with good vibes in mind, which made it "the perfect feel-good summer album".

Writing for the Official Charts Company, Carl Smith called the single "Malibu" a "delicious slice of summer from the outset", while noting its "exquisite funk guitar and dreamy echoes". He finished by saying the single marks a stylish departure from the band's previous works, but that it a "carefree piece of pop escapism" that encapsulates a pure sunshine. V Magazine noted that the song features a "groovy dance" sound, that's different from the rest of songs on the album. Writing about the album, Summer Mixtape, the magazine thought that it "curate the sunny, carefree summer vibe they envisioned for their next era".

== Track listing ==
All tracks are written and produced by Ross Lynch and Rocky Lynch, except where noted.

Summer Mixtape – Standard edition track listing
No.	Title	Writer(s)	Producer(s)	Length
1.	"Malibu"	Rocky Lynch; Ross Lynch; Griff Clawson	Rocky Lynch; Ross Lynch; Griff Clawson	2:47
2.	"Turn The Music Up"			3:16
3.	"I Got You, You Got Me"			1:24
4.	"Like A King"			2:13
5.	"Fantasy"			3:19
6.	"The Money"			2:48
7.	"Bronco"			2:27
8.	"Back To You"			2:02
9.	"Be Happening"			3:26
10.	"Endlessly"			2:14
11.	"Keep Moving Forward" (featuring Nikka Costa)	Rocky Lynch; Ross Lynch; Nikka Costa		3:16
Total length:				29:17

Summer Mixtape – Japanese Special Edition bonus tracks
No.	Title	Writer(s)	Producer(s)	Length
12.	"Natural" (Live)	Ross Lynch; Rocky Lynch; Ellington Ratliff	Ross Lynch; Rocky Lynch; Morgan Reid	3:09
13.	"San Francisco" (Live)	Ross Lynch; Rocky Lynch; Ratliff; Reid		4:00
14.	"I Love Japan" (Instrumental)
Total length:				36:26

Notes

- "Turn The Music Up" and "I Got You, You Got Me" are stylized in sentence case.

== Personnel ==
Credits are adapted from the album's liner notes.

=== The Driver Era ===
- Ross Lynch – production, vocals, drum programming, guitar, bass
- Rocky Lynch – production, vocals, drum programming, guitar, bass

== Release history ==
Summer Mixtape release history
Region	Date	Format(s)	Label	Ref.
Various	September 16, 2022	CD; digital download; streaming; vinyl LP; cassette	TOO Records	
Japan	September 16, 2022	CD	TOO Records	
