= Let's Not Be Alone Tonight =

Single by R5

from the album Sometime Last Night
- Released: February 13, 2015
- Recorded: 2014
- Genre: Power pop
- Length: 2:55
- Label: Hollywood
- Songwriters: Savan Kotecha; Kristian Lundin; Carl Falk; Johan Carlsson
- Producers: Falk; Carlsson

R5 singles chronology
"Smile" (2014)	"Let's Not Be Alone Tonight" (2015)	"All Night" (2015)

"Let's Not Be Alone Tonight" is a power pop song by American pop rock band R5. It was released on February 13, 2015, as the second single from their second studio album, Sometime Last Night. Its music video premiered on April 6, 2015 along with the announcement of the album.

== Release ==
"Let's Not Be Alone Tonight" had its radio premiere on February 13, 2015 on SiriusXM Hits 1. The song was available for digital download on February 16. They also released a lyric video the same day. "Let's Not Be Alone Tonight" was sent to mainstream radio in March.

== Music video ==
The music video was released on April 6, 2015. It features the band singing. Towards the end, several scenes feature 3D moments.

== Reception ==
"Let's Not Be Alone Tonight" received positive reviews. Music website Fanlala praised the song; they called it "magical" and thought the lyrics were "lovable". Heather Thompson from M Magazine said the single was "quite catchy". Virginia Van de Wall from J-14 was positive towards Ross Lynch's vocals. Teen magazine Popstar said "Let's Not Be Alone Tonight" is "nothing short of perfection".

== Charts ==
=== Weekly charts ===
Chart (2015)	Peak position
US Pop Airplay (Billboard)	37
