= Heart Made Up on You (song) =

Single by R5

from the album Heart Made Up on You
- Released: July 21, 2014
- Recorded: 2014
- Genre: Pop rock
- Length: 3:01
- Label: Hollywood
- Songwriters: Jess Cates; Dan Ostebo; Jordan Mohilowski; Emanuel Kiriakou; Evan "Kidd" Bogart; Andrew Goldstein; Cameron Forbes
- Producers: Kiriakou; Goldstein

R5 singles chronology
"One Last Dance" (2014)	"Heart Made Up on You" (2014)	"Smile" (2014)

"Heart Made Up on You" is a dance-rock song by American pop rock band R5, taken from their third extended play of the same name. The song was released for streaming on July 21, 2014, one day before the EP came out. It was then released for purchase at the iTunes Store on August 1.

== Composition ==
"Heart Made Up on You" is a pop rock song with a length of three minutes and thirty seconds. The song also contains elements of electronic dance music, unlike the band's previews singles. In an interview with MTV, the band spoke about the song, saying it was "darker" compared to the rest of their music. Ross said it is "sort of a natural evolution of R5 and [they're] just letting it all happen naturally."

== Reception ==
"Heart Made Up on You" has received generally positive reviews from fans and critics alike. Vivian Pham to Pop Dust said the song was positively different from the previous singles. She also said that the song was "catchy". Rachel Ho to Musichel said the song "capture[s] the hearts of dance-pop lovers." Ross' vocals were also praised.

== Live performances ==
On October 22, 2014, they performed "Heart Made Up on You" at We Day. The same month, they filmed their guest appearance at the episode of the Argentine telenovela Violetta where they performed the song.

== Music video ==
The video starts out with the band in a diner talking to a thief who they are in debt to. In order to pay back their debt, they must do something for him. The thief wants them to distract the town while he and the character meant to be Ross' girlfriend (portrayed by Juliette Buchs) rob a jewelry store. They proceed to do so by performing in the middle of the town. While robbing the store Ross' girlfriend is supposed to be watching the guard while her boss robs the place, but after realizing she has the car keys, she leaves, leading to the security guard catching her boss. The guard catches the thief which leads to him throwing the security guard through the window stopping the band performance and having everybody run. While overseeing the commotion, Ross sees his girlfriend is in trouble and runs to help her. Two nearby police officers see this and the thief convinces them that the robber is still inside, distracting them. After seeing Ross and his girlfriend together, he then proceeds to chase the two of them through the town. Stuck at a crossroads alleyway with the thief on their trail, they decide to distract the thief by going opposite directions, confusing him. They manage to get away with Ross grabbing the bag of stolen jewelry and drive away to a dirt road where not many people are around. After turning off the ignition, his girlfriend looks at him for a minute then kisses him, but only as a distraction, as she is really trying to handcuff him to the steering wheel, which she succeeds at. After handcuffing him she gets out of the car, takes the stolen jewelry, and throws away the car keys, thus leaving Ross with no way to escape.

== Release history ==
Country	Date	Format(s)	Label
United States	August 1, 2014	Digital download	Hollywood
United States	August 12, 2014	Mainstream radio	Hollywood
