= The Driver Era =

American duo

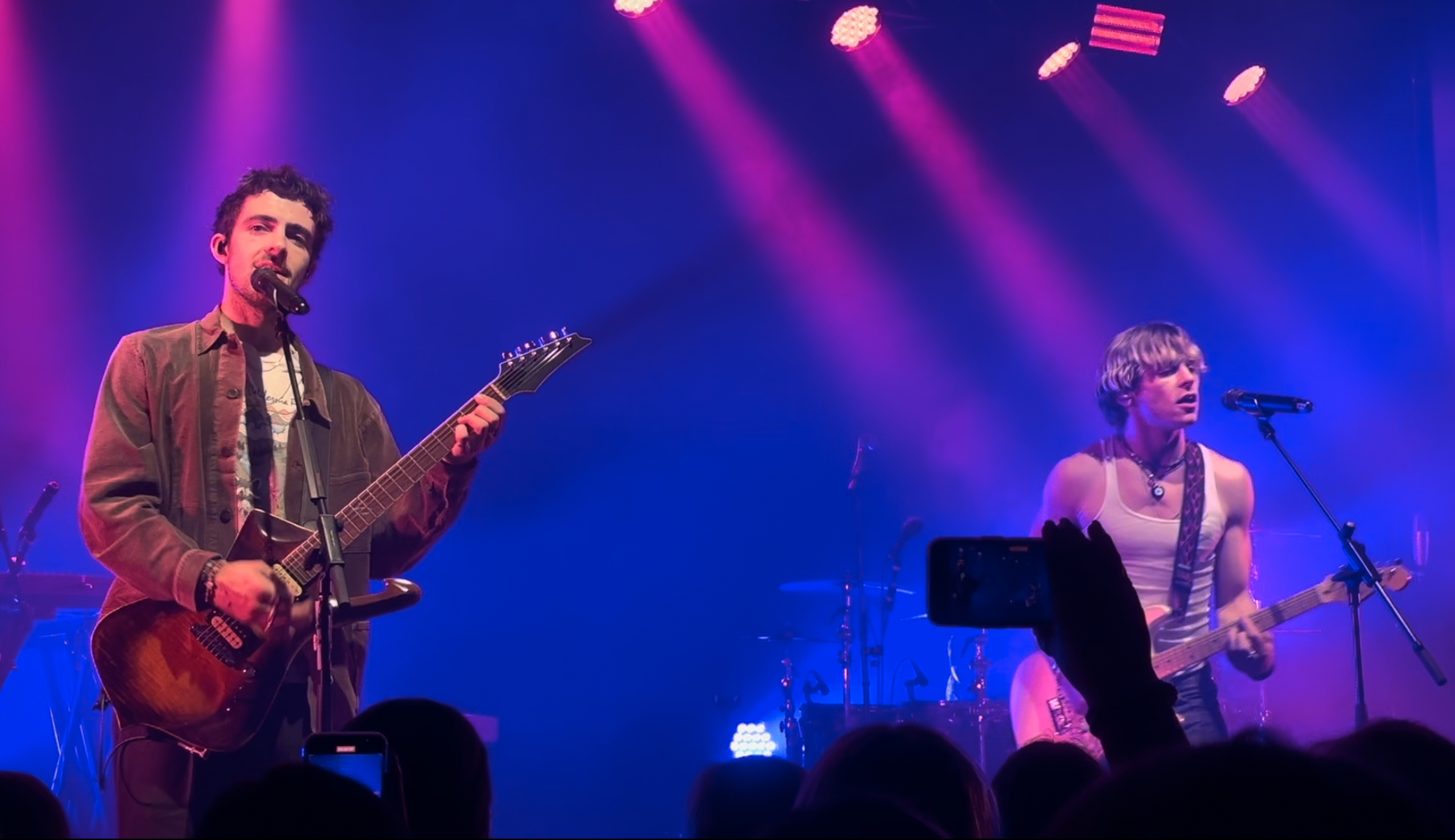
- Rocky (left) and Ross Lynch performing in Melbourne, Australia in 2022

Background information
- Origin: Los Angeles, California, U.S.
- Genres: Pop; funk-pop; dance rock
- Years active: 2018–present
- Labels: TOO; BMG
- Spinoff of: R5
- Members: Ross Lynch; Rocky Lynch
- Website: thedriverera.com

The Driver Era (Note: TDE, stylized in all caps or as THE DRIVER ERΛ) is an American music duo consisting of brothers Rocky and Ross Lynch. Both are former members of the now defunct R5.

== Career ==
=== 2018–2022: R5 to The Driver Era, X, Girlfriend and Summer Mixtape ===
On March 1, 2018, R5's Instagram and Twitter handles were changed to the Driver Era and all of R5's previous posts were deleted. On March 2, 2018, Ross announced via Instagram story that the Driver Era would be a band consisting of him and his brother Rocky. On the same day as their social media changes, previews of their debut single "Preacher Man" were posted on Twitter and Instagram. The name 'The Driver Era' came from a conversation between Rocky and Ross during a car ride to a party, and the brothers agreed that this name encompassed where their music was headed.

On March 16, 2018, they released "Preacher Man", along with its video a few weeks later. This single was met with high amounts of praise from the alternative/indie music scene. The video was based around a mixture of religions and sins. "Preacher Man" became the band's iconic song from the offing, the band having only released that song for a long period of time. The band also teased "Mary Jane", a song which was performed by Rocky but has never been released. This song was suspected to be their next single but that never came around.

On May 25, 2018, the Driver Era released two special remixes of "Preacher Man". On August 24, 2018, the Driver Era released a new single, "Afterglow", originally being released via YouTube before eventually being put onto Spotify. Along this period, the band also leaked their own song "My Silver Lining Is Overdue", a track which was due to be used in the film "Turnover" featuring band member and brother, Riker Lynch.

On October 26, 2018, the Driver Era released a new single, "Low", followed by a special remix a few months later. "Low" was popular for being the band's first official single that was sung by guitarist and producer Rocky Lynch, as opposed to by being sung by vocalist Ross Lynch.

On March 29, 2019, the Driver Era released a new single, "Feel You Now", followed by its video a few weeks later. This came after the band teased multiple songs throughout a YouTube video titled "Haven't left the garage" including "Feel You now", "Welcome To The End Of Your Life", "San Francisco" and "Scared of Heights". Alongside those 4 songs was an unnamed song that is yet to be revealed. On April 26, 2019, the Driver Era released a new single, "Welcome to the End of your Life", followed by its video a few weeks later. This was a song the band had teased multiple times throughout 2019 up until the point of release, revealing how it was a song that excited them during the production. On June 13, 2019, the Driver Era premiered their new music video for "Low" and announced their debut studio album, titled X. The album was released on June 28, 2019, including the previous singles and a handful of new songs that had previously been performed on the tour.

On October 25, 2019, the Driver Era released two singles, "A Kiss" and "Forever Always". On April 2, 2020, the Driver Era released the singles "OMG Plz Don’t Come Around" and "Flashdrive", from their upcoming second album, rumored to be released in the late summer, which would later be delayed primarily due to the COVID-19 pandemic putting strains on the band's "creative juices". On April 23, 2021, during a YouTube Live dedicated to MTV Friday Livestream's 1st birthday, the Driver Era announced their new single "Heaven Angel", to be released within the following four weeks. Weeks later, the band released "#1 Fan" and "Leave Me Feeling Confident" before finally announcing and then releasing Girlfriend, their second studio album. Following by The Girlfriend Tour with dates in US, Asia, Australia and Europe in both 2021 and 2022.

On June 30, 2022, the Driver Era released a new single, "Keep Moving Forward" featuring Nikka Costa, and "Malibu" on July 28, 2022. On August 4, 2022, the Driver Era announced their third studio album, titled Summer Mixtape, which released on September 16, 2022.

=== 2023–present: Obsession ===
On October 20, 2023, the Driver Era released a new single "Rumors". Later, on February 22, 2024, the band dropped a new song, "Get Off My Phone". They followed that up with another single, "You Keep Me Up at Night", on September 4, 2024, which served as the lead single for the upcoming album. The band announced their fourth studio album, Obsession at a London show September 2024 via a QR code with a February 14, 2025 release. On October 23, 2024, the band released "Don't Walk Away" as the second single from the album. On December 17, 2024, the band released their third single "Touch" off their upcoming album. On January 28, 2025, a fourth single "Same Old Story" was released alongside the cover, tracklist and updated release date for Obsession of April 11, 2025.

== Band members ==
=== Current members ===
- Ross Lynch – lead vocals, rhythm guitar (2018–present)
- Rocky Lynch – lead guitar, backing vocals (2018–present)

=== Touring members ===
Current

- Riker Lynch – bass guitar (2018–present)
- Ellington Ratliff – drums (2018–2020); music mixer, backing vocals, keyboards (2024–present)
- Dave Briggs – drums (2021–present)
- Garrison Jones – keyboards (2022–present)

Former

- Rydel Lynch – keyboards (2018–2022)

== Discography ==
The Driver Era discography
- Studio albums: 4
- EPs: 1
- Live albums: 1
- Singles: 20
- Music videos: 18
- Promotional singles: 2

=== Studio albums ===
Title	Album details
X	Released: June 28, 2019; Formats: Digital download, streaming; Label: BMG
Girlfriend	Released: October 15, 2021; Formats: CD, digital download, streaming, vinyl; Label: BMG
Summer Mixtape	Released: September 16, 2022; Formats: CD, digital download, streaming, vinyl, cassette; Label: TOO
Obsession	Released: April 11, 2025; Formats: CD, digital download, streaming; Label: TOO

=== Live albums ===
Title	Album details
Live at the Greek	Released: December 8, 2023; Formats: CD, digital download, streaming, vinyl, CD book; Label: TOO

=== Extended plays ===
Title	EP details
Some Remixes of X	Released: January 10, 2020; Formats: Digital download, streaming; Label: BMG

=== As lead artist ===
List of singles as lead artist, showing year released and album name
Title	Year	Album
"Preacher Man"	2018	X
"Afterglow"	2018	X
"Low"	2018	X
"Feel You Now"	2019	X
"Welcome to the End of Your Life"	2019	X
"A Kiss"	2019	Girlfriend
"Forever Always"	2019	Girlfriend
"OMG Plz Don't Come Around"	2020	Girlfriend
"Flashdrive"	2020	Girlfriend
"Take Me Away"	2020	Girlfriend
"Places"	2020	Girlfriend
"Fade"	2020	Girlfriend
"Heaven Angel"	2021	Girlfriend
"#1 Fan"	2021	Girlfriend
"Leave Me Feeling Confident"	2021	Girlfriend
"Heart of Mine"	2021	Girlfriend
"Keep Moving Forward" (featuring Nikka Costa)	2022	Summer Mixtape
"Malibu"	2022	Summer Mixtape
"Fantasy"	2022	Summer Mixtape
"Rumors"	2023	Non-album singles
"Get Off My Phone"	2024	Non-album singles
"You Keep Me Up at Night"	2024	Obsession
"Don't Walk Away"	2024	Obsession
"Touch"	2024	Obsession
"Same Old Story"	2025	Obsession
"Don’t Take The Night"	2025	Obsession
"Can’t Believe She Got Away"	2025	Obsession
"I’d Rather Die"	2025	Obsession

=== Promotional singles ===
List of promotional singles, showing year released and album name
Title	Year	Album
"Nobody Knows"	2019	X
"Slowdown" (The Driver Era Remix) (with Smallpools and Morgxn)	2020	Non-album promotional single
"Tried"	2025	Obsession

=== Guest appearances ===
List of other appearances, showing year released, other artist(s) credited and album name
Title	Year	Other artist(s)	Album
"Cool Girl"	2018	New Beat Fund	Chillanthrophy

=== Music videos ===
List of music videos, showing year released and director(s)
Title	Year	Director(s)	Ref.
"Preacher Man"	2018	Unknown	
"Feel You Now"	2019	Gordy De St. Jeor	
"Welcome to the End of Your Life"	2019	Stefano Bertelli	
"Low"	2019	Ross Lynch and Gordy De St. Jeor	
"Forever Always"	2019	Gordy De St. Jeor, Ross Lynch and Ryland Lynch	
"A Kiss"	2019	Ryland Lynch and Gordy De St. Jeor	
"OMG Plz Don't Come Around"	2020	Amber Robb	
"Flashdrive"	2020	Gordy De St. Jeor	
"Take Me Away"	2020	Ross Lynch, Ryland Lynch, Gordy De St. Jeor and Rocky Lynch	
"Places"	2020	Ross Lynch	
"Fade"	2020	Amber Robb	
"Heaven Angel"	2021	Gordy De St. Jeor and Ryland Lynch	
"#1 Fan"	2021	Ross Lynch and Rocky Lynch	
"Leave Me Feeling Confident" (Live)	2021	Jesse DeFlorio	
"Heart of Mine"	2021	Riker Lynch	
"Keep Moving Forward"	2022	Tate Warner	
"Malibu"	2022	Tate Warner	
"Fantasy"	2022	Gordy De St. Jeor	
"Rumors"	2023	Gordy De St. Jeor	
"Get off My Phone"	2024	Gordy De St. Jeor and Ross Lynch	
"You Keep Me Up at Night"	2024	Gordy De St. Jeor	

== Tours ==
=== Headlining ===
- A New Era Tour (2019)
- Girlfriend Tour (2021–2023)
- X Girlfriend Tour (2024)
- Obsession Tour (2025–2026)
