= Ross Lynch =

American singer and actor (born 1995)

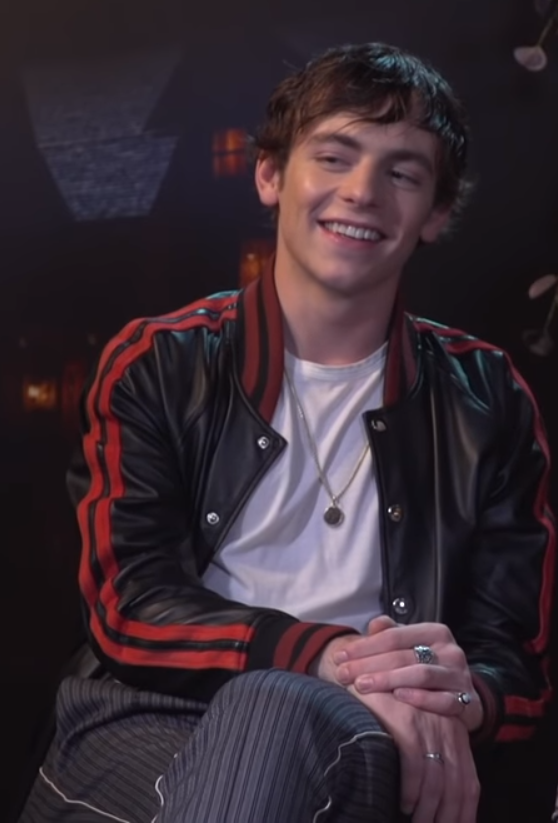
- Lynch in 2018
- Born: Ross Shor Lynch; December 29, 1995 (age 30); Littleton, Colorado, U.S.
- Occupations: Actor; singer
- Years active: 2009–present
- Works: Solo discography (Note: For his musical works with R5, see R5 discography and List of R5 concert tours. For his discography as the Driver Era, see The Driver Era discography); acting
- Relatives: Riker Lynch (brother); Rydel Lynch (sister); Derek Hough (2nd cousin); Julianne Hough (2nd cousin)
- Awards: Full list
- Musical career
- Genres: Pop rock; pop
- Instruments: Vocals; guitar
- Member of: The Driver Era
- Formerly of: R5
- Website: thedriverera.com

Signature
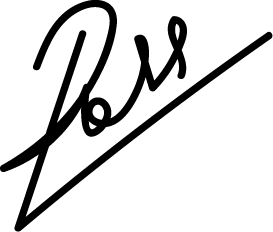

Ross Shor Lynch (born December 29, 1995) is an American actor and singer. He was the lead vocalist of the pop rock band R5 and current vocalist of the duo the Driver Era. As an actor, he rose to recognition for his leading roles as Austin Moon on Disney Channel's comedy television series Austin & Ally (2011–2016) and Brady in the network's musical films Teen Beach Movie (2013) and its sequel Teen Beach 2 (2015).

In 2017, Lynch starred in the biographical film My Friend Dahmer as a teenage Jeffrey Dahmer. In 2018, he starred in the romantic comedy film Status Update as Kyle. Between 2018 and 2020, he starred as Harvey Kinkle in the Netflix series Chilling Adventures of Sabrina.

== Early life ==
Ross Shor Lynch was born on December 29, 1995, and raised in Littleton, Colorado, a suburb of Denver. He has four siblings, sister Rydel, and brothers Riker, Rocky, and Ryland. He was educated at home starting in the fourth grade when he learned to sing and play the guitar and piano. Lynch is a second cousin of Derek and Julianne Hough, their maternal grandmothers being sisters. Lynch and his family moved to Los Angeles in 2007.

== Acting career ==
=== 2009–2016: Breakthrough with Disney ===
Lynch has appeared on the television shows So You Think You Can Dance and Moises Rules!, and in the 2010 short film Grapple. He was in Kidz Bop, appearing in a 2009 Kidz Bop video. He was also in Cymphonique's music video for "Lil' Miss Swagger".

In early 2011, Lynch was cast in the pilot for the Disney Channel sitcom Austin & Ally, playing the lead male role of Austin Moon, a teenage singer who becomes an overnight sensation after a music video featuring him performing is uploaded to the Internet. He later forms a partnership with Ally, played by Laura Marano. The pilot was later picked up for a full season's production; the show debuted in December 2011, and was renewed for a second season in March 2012. After four seasons, the series ended on January 10, 2016. Lynch guest starred with the Austin & Ally cast in a crossover episode with Jessie, and also he guest starred with his co-star Laura Marano on Girl Meets World, where he reprised his role as Austin Moon.

In early 2012, Lynch began working on the Disney Channel Original Movie Teen Beach Movie, playing the male lead role, Brady. The film was directed by Jeffrey Hornaday and premiered July 19, 2013, earning around 8.4 million viewers. Lynch also starred in the sequel, Teen Beach 2, which premiered on the Disney Channel on June 26, 2015, earning 7.5 million total viewers.

Lynch made a cameo appearance in the 2014 film Muppets Most Wanted. In 2016, he voiced the role of Piers in the English dub of the animated French adventure film Snowtime! The film centers around a group of children who plan and stage a giant snowball fight during the Christmas holiday.

=== 2016–present: Films and later work ===
In May 2016, it was announced that Lynch would be starring in his feature film debut, Status Update, a comedy that began filming in Vancouver in June and wrapped in July 2016. Lynch stars as a teenager who stumbles upon a magical app that causes his social media status updates to come true. In July, he was cast as a teenage Jeffrey Dahmer in My Friend Dahmer, a film based on the 2012 graphic novel of the same name by Derf Backderf.

Lynch starred as Mark Anthony in the Hollywood Bowl's production of A Chorus Line, which ran for three performances over the weekend of July 29, 2016. The musical, about dancers auditioning for a Broadway musical, was directed and choreographed by Baayork Lee, who starred in the original Broadway production.

In 2018, Lynch was cast in the role of Harvey Kinkle, Sabrina Spellman's boyfriend, on the Netflix series Chilling Adventures of Sabrina, which he played until the series ended in 2020.

In October 2025, Lynch was cast in a Netflix mystery thriller film Heartland from Shana Feste.

== Music career ==
=== Artistry and solo music ===
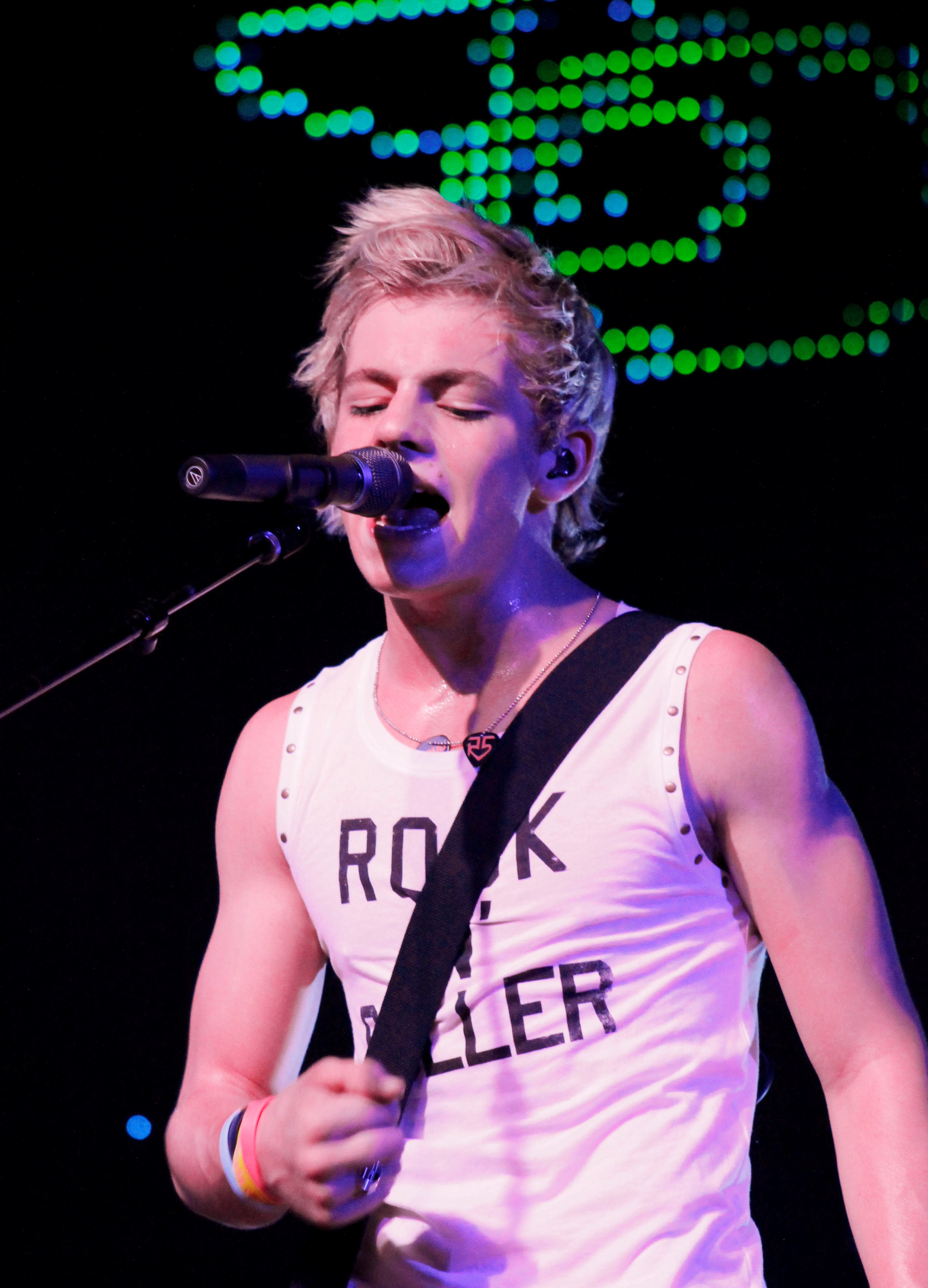
Lynch performing in R5's Loud Tour in 2013

Lynch plays piano, drums, and bass; he specializes in guitar. He has danced for the Rage Boyz Crew, a group founded by a dance company in Southern California.

His debut single, "A Billion Hits", was released on April 2, 2012. On July 13, 2012, Lynch released his second soundtrack single, "Heard It on the Radio", which reached number 196 on UK Singles Chart. Lynch recorded several songs for Austin & Ally. He sang all 14 songs for the TV show's soundtrack, which was released on September 12, 2012. These songs include "Can't Do It Without You" (the theme song for the series), "A Billion Hits", "Heard It on the Radio", and two songs with his band R5. The album peaked at #27 on the Billboard 200, one on the Billboard's Top Soundtracks and one on the Billboard's Kid Albums.

Lynch also sang most of the songs from Austin & Ally: Turn It Up, the show's second soundtrack. He recorded songs for Teen Beach Movie, the soundtrack of which was the fourth best-selling soundtrack of 2013 in the United States with 407,000 copies sold. He also sang two songs on the Austin & Ally: Take It from the Top EP. In 2015, Lynch recorded songs for Teen Beach 2, the soundtrack of which debuted at number 10 on the Billboard 200.

In 2016, Lynch contributed vocals to Tritonal's song "I Feel the Love" from their album Painting with Dreams.

=== 2009–2018: R5 and breakthrough ===
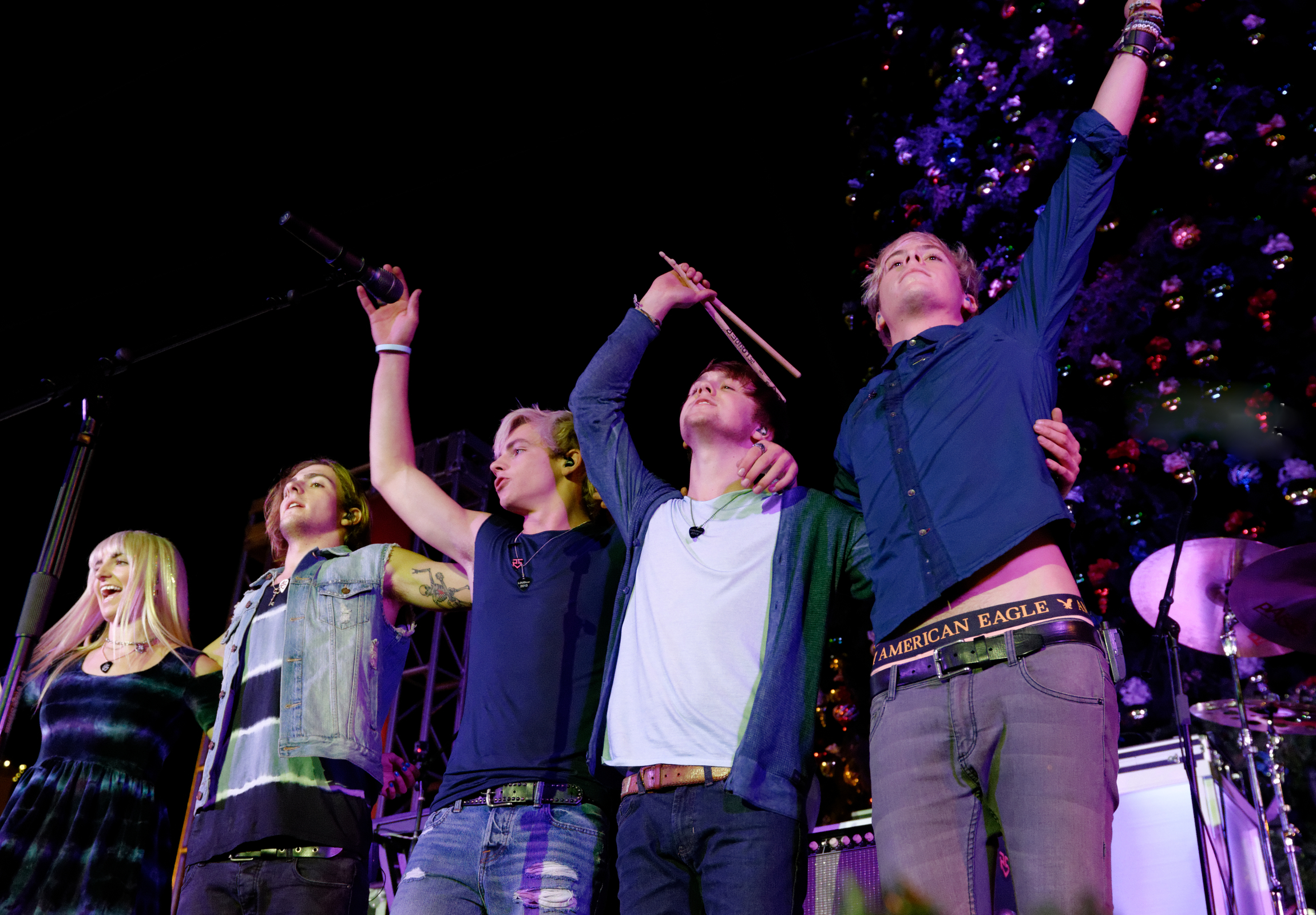
R5 performing in Commerce, California, in 2013

In March 2010, R5 self-released an EP, Ready Set Rock, and in April 2012, they signed with Hollywood Records. Their second EP, Loud, was released on February 19, 2013, which featured the lead single and title track "Loud". The band's first full-length album, Louder, was released on September 24, 2013, and the album includes the four songs from Loud as well as seven new songs. The second single from the album, "Pass Me By", premiered on Radio Disney on August 16, 2013. The music video premiered on August 29 on Disney Channel and is available for public viewing on the band's Vevo channel. The third single, "(I Can't) Forget About You", was released on December 25, 2013, and reached number 47 on the Billboard Digital Pop Songs chart, and the fourth single, "One Last Dance", was released on May 29, 2014. Their third extended play, Heart Made Up on You, was released on July 22, 2014, and their self-titled single was released on August 1, 2014.

On November 16, 2014, the band released the first single from their second album, "Smile". "Let's Not Be Alone Tonight", the second single, was released on February 13, 2015. "All Night" was released as the third single on June 2, 2015, along with the album's iTunes pre-order. The band released their second full-length album on July 10, 2015, titled Sometime Last Night, and debuted at number 6 on the Billboard 200, number 1 on the Billboard Top Pop Albums, number 3 on the Billboard Top Digital Albums, and number 4 on the Billboard Top Album Sales.

On May 12, 2017, R5 released their fifth EP New Addictions.

=== 2018–2022: From R5 to the Driver Era ===
On March 1, 2018, R5's Instagram and Twitter handles were changed to the Driver Era and all of R5's previous posts were deleted. On March 2, 2018, Lynch announced via Instagram story that the Driver Era would be a band consisting of him and his brother Rocky. On the same day as their social media changes, previews of their debut single "Preacher Man" were posted on Twitter and Instagram. The name the Driver Era came from a conversation between Rocky and Ross during a car ride to a party, and the brothers agreed that this name encompassed where their music was headed.

On June 13, 2019, the duo premiered their new music video for "Low" and announced their debut studio album, titled X. The album was released on June 28, 2019, including the previous singles and a handful of new songs that had previously been performed on the tour.

On October 25, 2019, the Driver Era released two singles, "A Kiss" and "Forever Always".

=== 2023–present: Further success with Obsession ===
On October 20, 2023, the Driver Era released a new single "Rumors". Later, on February 22, 2024, the band released a new song, "Get Off My Phone". They followed that up with another single, "You Keep Me Up at Night", on September 4, 2024, which served as the lead single for the upcoming album. The band announced their fourth studio album, Obsession at a London show September 2024 via a QR code with a February 14, 2025, release. On October 23, 2024, the band released "Don't Walk Away" as the second single from the album. On December 17, 2024, the band released their third single "Touch" off their upcoming album. On January 28, 2025, a fourth single, "Same Old Story", was released alongside the cover, tracklist and updated release date for Obsession of April 11, 2025.

In 2026, Lynch played the role of Jace Jacobs in the Netflix mystery thriller film Heartland alongside Jessica Chastain and Cater Faith and directed by Shana Feste. He also performed the songs Heartbreak Country and The Night We Met in the film.

== Personal life ==
On November 5, 2026, during the premiere of Heartland, Lynch confirmed to People magazine that he is married. He has not publicly revealed his wife's identity out of respect for her privacy, noting that she is not fond of celebrity culture.

== Acting credits ==
=== Film ===
Ross Lynch film performances
Year	Title	Role	Notes
2014	Muppets Most Wanted	Young florist / nerd teenage kid	
2016	Snowtime!	Piers	Voice role (English dub)
2017	My Friend Dahmer	Jeffrey Dahmer	
2018	Status Update	Kyle Moore	Direct-to-video film
2026	Heartland	Jace Jacobs	

=== Television ===
Ross Lynch television performances
Year	Title	Role	Notes
2009	Moises Rules!	Ross "the Boss"	Episode: "Mad B-Ball shootout"
2011–2016	Austin & Ally	Austin Moon	Lead role
2012	Jessie	Austin Moon	Episode: "Austin & Jessie & Ally All Star New Year"
2013	Teen Beach Movie	Brady	Television film
2013	Ultimate Spider-Man	Jack Russell / Werewolf by Night	Episode: "The Howling Commandos"
2015	Violetta	Himself	Episodes: "Una visita, una canción" "Una Explicación, Una Canción"
2015	Teen Beach 2	Brady	Television film
2015	Girl Meets World	Austin Moon	Episode: "Girl Meets World of Terror 2"
2018–2020	Chilling Adventures of Sabrina	Harvey Kinkle	Main role

=== Stage ===
- A Chorus Line at the Hollywood Bowl (2016), as Mark Anthony

== Discography ==
=== Soundtrack albums ===
List of albums, with selected chart positions
Title	Album details	Peak chart positions								
Title	Album details	US	US OST	BEL	CAN	FRA	NL	NZ	SPA	UK
Austin & Ally	Released: September 11, 2012; Formats: CD, digital download, streaming; Label: Walt Disney	27	1	—	—	—	—	—	—	—
Teen Beach Movie	Released: July 16, 2013; Formats: CD, digital download, streaming; Label: Walt Disney	3	1	176	14	76	56	30	15	36
Austin & Ally: Turn It Up	Released: December 17, 2013; Formats: CD, digital download, streaming; Label: Walt Disney	89	6	—	—	—	—	—	—	—
Austin & Ally: Take It from the Top	Released: April 17, 2015; Formats: CD, digital download, streaming; Label: Walt Disney	—	23	—	—	—	—	—	—	—
Teen Beach 2	Released: June 23, 2015; Formats: CD, digital download, streaming; Label: Walt Disney	10	1	—	—	129	—	—	67	—
"—" denotes releases that did not chart or were not released in that territory.

=== Promotional singles ===
Title	Year	Peak chart positions		Album
Title	Year	US Holiday	US Kids	Album
"A Billion Hits"	2012	—	1	Austin & Ally
"Heard It on the Radio"	2012	—	2	Austin & Ally
"Can You Feel It"	2012	—	1	Austin & Ally (Japan Edition)
"I Love Christmas" (with Laura Marano)	2013	50	—	Disney Holidays Unwrapped
"—" denotes releases that did not chart or were not released in that territory.

=== Other charted songs ===
List of singles, with selected chart positions
Title	Year	Peak chart positions					Album
Title	Year	US	US Holiday	US Kids	IRL	UK	Album
"Christmas Soul"	2012	—	6	—	—	—	Disney Channel Holiday Playlist
"Christmas Is Coming" (with R5)	2012	—	14	—	—	—	Disney Channel Holiday Playlist
"Cruisin' for a Bruisin'" (among Teen Beach Movie cast)	2013	82	—	—	90	117	Teen Beach Movie
"Like Me" (among Teen Beach Movie cast)	2013	—	—	—	—	117	Teen Beach Movie
"Can't Stop Singing" (with Maia Mitchell)	2013	—	—	—	—	200	Teen Beach Movie
"Gotta Be Me" (among Teen Beach Movie cast)	2015	—	—	—	—	—	Teen Beach 2
"—" denotes releases that did not chart or were not released in that territory.

=== Guest appearances ===
Song	Year	Other artist(s)	Album
"You Can Come to Me"	2014	Laura Marano	Disney Channel Play It Loud
"Timeless"	2014	N/A	Disney Channel Play It Loud
"I Got That Rock and Roll"	2014	N/A	Disney Channel Play It Loud
"I Feel the Love"	2016	Tritonal	Painting with Dreams

=== Music videos ===
List of music videos, showing year released and director
Title	Year	Director	Notes
"Little Miss Swagger"	2009	Unknown	Guest appearance; Cymphonique Miller's music video
"Ordinary Girl"	2010	Shane Drake	Guest appearance; Hannah Montana's music video
"Double Take"	2012	Unknown	
"Better Together"	2012	Unknown	
"Heard It on the Radio"	2012	Matt Stawski	
"One of Your Girls"	2023	Gordon von Steiner	Guest appearance; Troye Sivan's music video

== Awards and nominations ==
Year	Award	Category	Nominated work	Result	Ref.
2013	Nickelodeon Kids' Choice Awards	Favorite TV Actor	Austin & Ally	Won	
2013	Radio Disney Music Awards	Best Music Video	Heard It On The Radio	Won	
2013	Radio Disney Music Awards	Funniest Celebrity Take	Himself	Nominated	
2014	Nickelodeon Kids' Choice Awards	Favorite TV Actor	Austin & Ally	Won	
2014	Teen Choice Awards	Choice TV Actor: Comedy	Austin & Ally	Won	
2015	Nickelodeon Kids' Choice Awards	Favorite TV Actor	Austin & Ally	Won	
2015	Teen Choice Awards	Choice Music: Song from a Movie or TV Show (with Teen Beach 2 cast)	Teen Beach 2	Nominated	
2015	Teen Choice Awards	Choice Summer TV Star: Male	Teen Beach 2	Nominated	
2015	Teen Choice Awards	Choice TV: Chemistry (with Laura Marano)	Austin & Ally	Nominated	
2015	Teen Choice Awards	Choice TV Actor: Comedy	Austin & Ally	Won	
2016	Nickelodeon Kid's Choice Awards	Favorite Male TV Star: Kid's Show	Austin & Ally	Won	
2016	Teen Choice Awards	Choice TV Actor: Comedy	Austin & Ally	Won	
2019	Teen Choice Awards	Choice Sci-Fi/Fantasy TV Actor	Chilling Adventures of Sabrina	Nominated	
