= Ellington Ratliff =

American drummer and actor

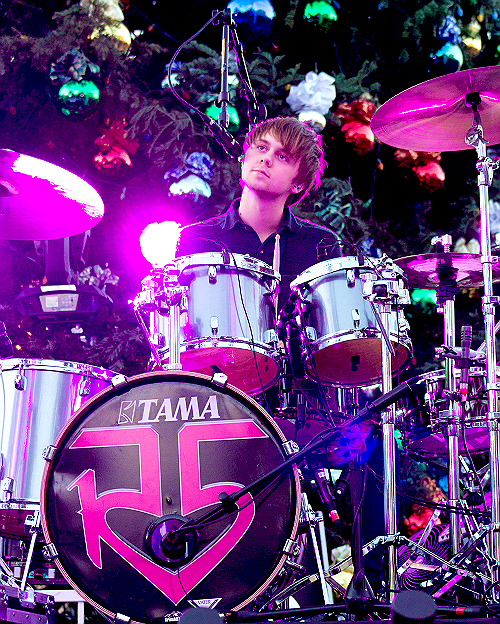
- Ratliff in 2013

Background information
- Born: Ellington Lee Ratliff; April 14, 1993 (age 33); Los Angeles, California, U.S.
- Genres: Pop rock; power pop; alternative rock; pop
- Occupations: Musician, actor
- Instruments: Drums
- Label: Hollywood
- Formerly of: R5
- Website: ellington.ffm.to/ellington

Ellington Lee Ratliff (born April 14, 1993) is an American drummer and actor. He is best known as the drummer of pop rock band R5, which was active from 2009 until 2018, and as a contributor to the Driver Era.

== Early life ==
Ellington Lee Ratliff was born on April 14, 1993, in Los Angeles, California, to Cheryl and George Ratliff. From his father's previous marriage, Ratliff has three half-brothers: Erick, Elden, and Garette.

== Career ==
=== Acting ===
In 2001, Ratliff made his acting debut in All You Need as Robbie Crenshaw. As a young adult, he appeared in episodes of television shows like Eastwick, Raising Hope, Nickelodeon's Victorious, and Red Scare as well as the 2012 film My Uncle Rafael. He and Ross Lynch of R5 were extras in the 2011 movie The Muppets. Ratliff appeared in the 2017 Criminal Minds "Red Light" as well as in a 2019 episode of Grown-ish.

=== Music ===
In October 2009, Ratliff met the Lynch siblings at a dance studio in California.

== Equipment ==
Ratliff uses DW drums, pedals and hardware and Paiste cymbals, favoring their 2002 series. He has also used Tama drums and Promark drumsticks.

== Filmography ==
=== Television ===
| Year | Title | Role | Notes |
|---|---|---|---|
| 2009 | So You Think You Can Dance | Himself | "Two of 16 Voted Off" (Season 5, Episode 11) |
| 2009 | Eastwick | Allan | "Mooning and Crooning" (Season 1, Episode 5) |
| 2010 | Victorious | Ian | "Pilot" (Season 1, Episode 1) |
| 2010-2011 | General Hospital | unnamed ski trip victim | |
| 2011 | Raising Hope | Son | "It's a Hopeful Life" (Season 2, Episode 10) |
| 2011 | The Muppets | Smalltown Resident | |
| 2013 | Red Scare | Huey Miller | "The Nuclear Club" (Season 1, Episode 1) "Brinksmanship" (Season 1, Episode 4) |
| 2015 | Violetta | Himself (with R5) | Season 3, episode 70 |
| 2017 | Criminal Minds | Ronnie Hawks | "Red Light" (Season 12, Episode 22) |
| 2019 | Grown-ish | Friend | |

=== Films ===
| Year | Title | Role |
|---|---|---|
| 2001 | All You Need | Robbie Crenshaw |
| 2012 | My Uncle Rafael | Photographer |

== Discography ==
=== Extended plays ===
| Title | Details |
|---|---|
| Ellington | Released: April 26, 2021; Format: Digital download, streaming; Label: Ellington Music |

=== Singles ===
List of singles as lead artist, showing year released
| Title | Year | Album |
|---|---|---|
| "EMT" | 2020 | Ellington |
| "Sun To Rise!" | 2021 | Ellington |
