= New Politics =

New Politics can refer to:

== Politics ==
- New Politics Initiative in Canada
- New Politics Network in the UK
- New Politics Party in Thailand
- New politics (Scotland), a political slogan used in the run-up to the 1997 Scottish devolution referendum
- New Politics (Ukraine), a political party in Ukraine

== Publications ==
- New Politics (magazine), a longstanding socialist journal published in the United States

== Music ==
- New Politics (band), a rock band from Denmark
- New Politics (album), the first studio album by New Politics
