= Bad Girls (MKTO song) =

Single by MKTO

from the album Bad Girls EP
- Released: June 2, 2015 (iTunes)
- Recorded: 2015
- Genre: Pop
- Length: 3:14
- Label: Columbia
- Songwriter(s): Emanuel Kiriakou; Evan Bogart; Malcolm Kelley; Andrew Goldstein; Lindy Robbins; Clarence Coffee Jr.; Tony Oller
- Producer(s): Emanuel Kiriakou; Evan Bogart; Andrew Goldstein

MKTO singles chronology
| "American Dream" (2014) | "Bad Girls" (2015) | "Hand off My Heart / Places You Go" (2016) |

"Bad Girls" is a single by American duo MKTO, released as a digital download on June 2, 2015, by Columbia Records. It serves as the first single from their first extended play, Bad Girls EP (2015). The song is a pop song with heavy funk influences featuring predominant saxophone instrumentation in its production. The duo performed the song for the first time on June 2, 2015, during Good Morning America as well as on The Late Late Show on June 4, 2015.

== Background and composition ==
The song was written by Emanuel Kiriakou, Evan Bogart, Andrew Goldstein, Lindy Robbins, Clarence Coffee Jr., as well as MKTO's own Malcolm Kelley and Tony Oller whilst produced by Kiriakou, Bogart and Goldstein. The track is a pop song with strong funk influences, featuring a predominant horn sound in its composition. Oller told Teen Vogue: "We just want to make music that's current and consistent with what everyone is vibing to. For 'Bad Girls', we recorded a real horn section which isn't something a lot of people do these days. We really wanted to go back to that and go back to the roots of making music."

Speaking to J-14, the duo said of the song's overall sound: "It has an "Uptown Funk" feel to it, it's awesome, we have real instruments in it, we have unbelievable background singers on it. It's going to be a way different sound than the first album. We're proud to play it for our friends. It's not so poppy, but still has that element. We're excited for it."

== Music video ==
The music video was directed by Hannah Lux Davis, it was filmed on April 30, 2015, and released on June 5, 2015. Kelley described the video as a "mini movie". It features Oller and Kelley being abducted by a group of "bad girls" and were held hostage. They later escape and capture. The video's initial conception featured ideas of parties, however MKTO wanted something cinematic. Oller said: “Us having the acting backgrounds we have, we wanted to do something cinematic. We always look for any excuse to be able to do that kind of stuff. We came across one that was great and had a P.O.W. camp where these gorgeous women would take us hostage in very sexy outfits, but with a twist: these are women who are not only sexy, but who you don’t want to mess with. There’s a Mad Max kind of theme.” In addition, a lyric video to the song was released on May 29, 2015, to YouTube.

== Charts ==
| Chart (2015) | Peak position |
|---|---|
| Australia (ARIA) | 80 |
| Czech Republic (Singles Digitál Top 100) | 74 |
| Russia Airplay (Tophit) | 211 |
| US Pop Airplay (Billboard) | 36 |
