= Adrenaline Rush =

Adrenaline Rush may refer to:

- Adrenaline Rush (album), the 1997 album by Twista
- Adrenaline Rush 2007, the 2007 album by Twista
- Adrenaline Rush, a 2009 album by Alex Roots
- Adrenaline Rush (film), a 2002 IMAX film about base jumping
- "Adrenaline Rush", a 2002 song by Obie Trice from the 8 Mile soundtrack
- "Adrenaline Rush", a 2023 song by Sigma from London Sound

== See also ==
- Adrenaline junkie
- Acute stress reaction
- Panic attack
- Posttraumatic stress disorder
- Rest and digest
- Stressor
- Tend and befriend
- Vasoconstriction
- Fight-or-flight response
