= God Only Knows (MKTO song) =

Single by MKTO

from the album MKTO
- Released: November 29, 2013
- Recorded: 2013
- Genre: Pop
- Length: 3:15
- Songwriter(s): Malcolm David Kelley; Tony Oller

MKTO singles chronology
"Classic" (2013)	"God Only Knows" (2013)	"American Dream" (2014)

"God Only Knows" is a song recorded by American musical duo MKTO. It was released on November 29, 2013, as the third single from their debut album MKTO. The music video for the single also premiered on that day.

== Music video ==
The music video for this single was released on 29 November 2013, on the same day in which the single was released.

Malcolm and Tony play a game called 'God Only Knows' and get too obsessed with it, Malcolm hides the game in the fridge, but Tony finds it. During the video, Tony is getting bored on his date and skips out to play the game and Malcolm fools his boss with a cardboard box dummy of himself to play the game. Later at the recording studio, Malcolm leaves early to run back to their apartment for the game, but Tony takes a taxi back. As they wrestle for the game, it falls out of a window to the car park and Tony and Malcolm race down to the car park, but before they could pick it up, a car runs it over. Since the game was now ruined, they decide not to play any more games, but a mailman comes up to them with a package, presumably the sequel or a replacement and struggle for it. Tony wins the struggle and heads in their apartment as Malcolm thanks the mailman before heading in himself.

== Charts performance ==
=== Weekly charts ===
Chart (2013)	Peak position
Australia (ARIA)	11
New Zealand (Recorded Music NZ)	19

=== Year-end charts ===
Chart (2014)	Position
Australia (ARIA)	95

== Certifications ==
Region	Certification	Certified units/sales
Australia (ARIA)	Platinum	70,000^{^}
New Zealand (RMNZ)	Platinum	15,000^{*}
^{*} Sales figures based on certification alone.^{^} Shipments figures based on certification alone.
