= Thank You (MKTO song) =

Single by MKTO

from the album MKTO
- Released: November 12, 2012
- Recorded: 2012
- Genre: Pop rap; teen pop
- Length: 3:49
- Label: Columbia
- Songwriters: Evan "Kidd" Bogart; Emanuel Kiriakou; Andrew Goldstein; Tony Oller; Malcolm David Kelley
- Producers: Bogart, Kiriakou

MKTO singles chronology
"Thank You" (2012)	"Classic" (2013)

"Thank You" is the debut single by American pop duo MKTO, composed of Malcolm David Kelley and Tony Oller. It was released through Columbia Records on November 12, 2012, and is from their 2014 self-titled debut album. The song was written by Kelley, Oller, Evan "Kidd" Bogart, Emanuel Kiriakou, and Andrew Goldstein. It is a hip hop and teen pop song about a younger generation's sarcastic gratitude towards their previous generation after suffering the effects of their previous wrongdoings, yet it brings hope and encouragement to people saying that they should stand up for themselves.

The song became a hit in Australia and New Zealand, and charted in the top 40 in the Netherlands and the Billboard Mainstream Top 40 charts.

== Background and release ==
Malcolm David Kelley and Tony Oller met in the 2010 while filming the television series Gigantic, in which their characters were portrayed as best friends. Apart from filming Gigantic, the two posted cover versions of songs in YouTube, which caught the attention of Evan "Kidd" Bogart and Emanuel Kiriakou and led to them being signed to Columbia Records in 2012. "Thank You", their debut single, was released on November 12, 2012. It was released as the lead single from their debut album MKTO which was released on January 30, 2014. The accompanying music video of the song was filmed by Chris Marrs Piliero and premiered on January 4, 2013.

== Music video ==
The song's accompanying music video was filmed by Chris Marrs Piliero and was released on January 4, 2013, on their Vevo account. It features an appearance by Harold Perrineau who plays the father of Kelley's character on the television series Lost. In the video, Malcolm and Tony listen to a politician talking about budget cuts who clearly bores them. Asked about the youth of America, the politician claims "They're screwed.", which angers Malcolm and Tony. The duo somehow come on the TV, push the politician away, and start singing. During the song, they come out of a desk in a classroom where Malcolm sprays the teacher's mouth, causing it to disappear. Malcolm, Tony and the students start spraying graffiti and handing balloons to politicians that cause the string to tie around their wrist and sprung in the air. Malcolm and Tony later stand on a Range Rover and sing on it as a big crowd comes up to them and cheer along with them.

== Composition ==
"Thank You is a song we wanted to do speaking about our generation and what is really going on right now. Every generation has a song. We’re not trying to say this is the song, but it’s a story and we wanted to talk about what is going on right now. Thank you is a sarcastic way of saying you know what,"

— Oller about the song's content.

"Thank You" is a pop rap and teen pop song with a length of three minutes and forty-nine seconds. It is written in the key of B major. Lyrically, it is a sarcastically-written approach on the world's issues and a sarcastic gratitude to the previous generation.

Kelley described it as "[about] the world we are living in. By that, I mean, the situations us young folks are in due to some of our elders' decisions, we have the power to take things into our own hands nowadays. Following your dreams, working at it, and education are key." Oller remarked, "We're just really trying to do an anthem for our generation, what us kids go through in the economic times right now is not easy." He also added, "We wanted to have a song that described our views of our generation, and to describe how we feel about being in the circumstances we are in, thanks to previous generations making mistakes."

== Chart performance ==
"Thank You" debuted on the Dutch Mega Single Top 100 chart in the Netherlands on the week of January 19, 2013 at number 94 and peaked at number 37. It also debuted on the Dutch Top 40 chart on the week of April 6, 2013 and peaked at number 27. In New Zealand, it debuted on the NZ Top 40 chart at number 22 on February 4, 2013, and peaked at number 7. In Australia, "Thank You" debuted on the ARIA Singles chart at number 28 on the week of March 4, 2013 and peaked at number 2. In the United States, "Thank You" charted at the Billboard Bubbling Under Hot 100 Singles chart at number 20. and on the Pop Songs chart at number 38.

== Critical response ==
Crystal Bell of Celebuzz wrote, "[...] MKTO's "Thank You" is more than just another song about teenage angst—it's an anthem for underdogs, something both Oller and Kelley experienced in their careers." Entertainment Tonight described "Thank You" as a "catchy debut single".

== Track listing ==
Digital download

No.	Title	Length
1.	"Thank You"	3:49

== Charts ==
=== Weekly charts ===
Weekly chart performance for "Thank You"
Chart (2013)	Peak position
Australia (ARIA)	2
Belgium (Ultratip Bubbling Under Flanders)	30
Czech Republic Airplay (ČNS IFPI)	84
Netherlands (Dutch Top 40)	27
Netherlands (Single Top 100)	37
New Zealand (Recorded Music NZ)	7
Slovakia Airplay (ČNS IFPI)	53
Slovakia Singles Digital (ČNS IFPI)	32
US Bubbling Under Hot 100 Singles (Billboard)	20
US Mainstream Top 40 (Billboard)	38

=== Year-end charts ===
Year-end chart performance for "Thank You"
Chart (2013)	Position
Australia (ARIA)	19
Netherlands (Dutch Top 40)	151
New Zealand (Recorded Music NZ)	27

== Certifications ==
Certifications for "Thank You"
Region	Certification	Certified units/sales
Australia (ARIA)	4× Platinum	280,000^{^}
New Zealand (RMNZ)	2× Platinum	30,000^{*}
^{*} Sales figures based on certification alone.^{^} Shipments figures based on certification alone.

== Radio and release history ==
List of release dates, showing region, release format, and label
Region	Date	Format	Label
Australia	November 12, 2012	Digital download	Sony Music Entertainment
Canada	November 12, 2012	Digital download	Sony Music Entertainment
Netherlands	November 12, 2012	Digital download	Sony Music Entertainment
New Zealand	November 12, 2012	Digital download	Sony Music Entertainment
United States	November 12, 2012	Digital download	Columbia Records
