= How Can I Forget =

How Can I Forget may refer to:

- "How Can I Forget" (MKTO song), 2018
- "How Can I Forget" (The Temptations song), 1968, covered by Marvin Gaye in 1969
- "How Can I Forget", a song by Fat Joe and Remy Ma from the 2017 album Plata O Plomo
