= Dignity (New Politics song) =

Single by New Politlcs

from the album New Politics
- Released: 2010
- Genre: Alternative rock
- Length: 3:15
- Label: RCA Records
- Songwriter(s): David Boyd, Soren Hansen, Louis Vecchio

New Politlcs singles chronology
"Yeah Yeah Yeah" (2010)	"Dignity" (2010)	"Harlem" (2013)

"Dignity" is the second single of the alternative rock band New Politics, from their debut album New Politics. It peaked at No. 29 on the Billboard Alternative Songs chart.

According to singer David Boyd, "Dignity" was a song that was written differently than how it was planned. Boyd states that the band kept receiving messages from fans applauding them for the song and claiming it affected them personally. Guitarist Soren Hansen credits "Dignity" as well as "Yeah Yeah Yeah" as the reasons the band moved to America and states he loves performing them live. Drummer Louis Vecchio recommends the song to someone first checking out the band.

Theorie magazine praised the song as "another standout track. It’s almost abrasive, riding sublimely constructed currents of energy through its unrestricted emotionalism, with the band’s fierce delivery tipped to the point of insanity and rage." On the other hand Sputnikmusic criticized the allusion to Rage Against the Machine, called the song "blundering" and said that "their blathering about guns and bombs ultimately comes off as empty, rote platitudes."

== Charts ==
Chart (2010)	Peak position
US Alternative Songs	29
