= Now That's What I Call Music! 48 =

Now That's What I Call Music! 48 or Now 48 may refer to two Now That's What I Call Music! series albums:

- Now That's What I Call Music! 48 (UK series), 2001 release
- Now That's What I Call Music! 48 (U.S. series), 2013 release
