= 17 Again =

17 Again may refer to:

== Film ==
- Seventeen Again, a 2000 film starring Tia, Tamera, and Tahj Mowry
- 17 Again (film), a 2009 film starring Zac Efron and Matthew Perry

== Music ==
- "17 Again" (song), a 2000 single by Eurythmics
- "17 Again" a song by Brantley Gilbert on the 2014 album Just As I Am
- "17 Again", a 2014 song by Tiffany Houghton

== See also ==
- 18 Again!, a 1988 American fantasy-comedy film
  - based on the 1979 song "I Wish I Was Eighteen Again"
- 18 Again, a 2020 South Korean television series based on the 2009 film 17 Again, likely inspired by the 1988 film 18 Again!
