= MKTO (album) =

2014 studio album by MKTO

Studio album by MKTO
- Released: January 30, 2014 (Australia and New Zealand); April 1, 2014 (North America)
- Genres: Pop; teen pop; hip-hop
- Length: 38:02
- Label: Columbia
- Producers: Emanuel Kiriakou; Evan Bogart; Andrew Goldstein; Jens Koerkemeier; Carl Falk; Rami Yacoub

MKTO chronology
MKTO (2014)	Bad Girls EP (2015)

Singles from MKTO
- 1. "Thank You" Released: November 12, 2012; 2. "Classic" Released: June 20, 2013; 3. "God Only Knows" Released: November 29, 2013; 4. "American Dream" Released: April 17, 2014; 5. "Forever Until Tomorrow" Released: August 27, 2014

MKTO is the only album by the American musical duo MKTO. It was released on January 30, 2014, in Australia and New Zealand, and was released on April 1 in North America.

== Background ==
The album was released on January 30, 2014, in Australia and New Zealand. The album was released in the US on April 1, 2014. MKTO stands for "Misfit Kids and Total Outcasts". The duo explains that the title fits the album and it represents the kind of kids they were in high school.

== Singles ==
The album's lead single, "Thank You", was released on November 12, 2012. It was followed up by two further singles: "Classic", which was released on 20 June 2013; and "God Only Knows", released on 29 November 2013. On April 8, 2014, "American Dream" was released as the fourth single and on August 27, 2014, the duo confirmed via an Instagram post that the Max Martin penned "Forever Until Tomorrow" had been announced as the fifth Australian single, with its radio release immediate.

== Chart performance ==
In Australia, MKTO debuted at number 1 on the Australian ARIA albums chart. In the US, MKTO reached Number 31 on the Billboard 200. The album is certified Platinum in Denmark and sold 20,000 units.

== Critical reception ==
Professional ratings
Review scores
Source	Rating
Allmusic	3.5/5 stars

Matt Collar of AllMusic gave the album a positive review, stating the album "showcases the duo's one-two punch style, which usually consists of Oller's resonant vocals backed by Kelly's playful raps. What could end up sounding gimmicky or contrived doesn't, as Kelly (who some may remember as Walt on Lost) and Oller reveal they have enough thoughtful irreverence and technical skill to keep things interesting." Melissa Redman of Renowned for Sound gave the album 4 out of 5 stars stating that "All songs contain a dynamic energy, and it's evident in the music that the duo had fun creating these tracks" and "MKTO's album delivers a great variety of songs."

== Track listing ==
No.	Title	Writer(s)	Length
1.	"Thank You"	Malcolm David Kelley; Tony Oller; Emanuel Kiriakou; Evan Bogart; Andrew Goldstein	3:49
2.	"Classic"	Kiriakou; Bogart; Goldstein; Lindy Robbins	2:55
3.	"God Only Knows"	Kiriakou; Bogart; Goldstein; Oller	3:15
4.	"American Dream"	Kiriakou; Bogart; Goldstein; Robbins; Nathan Charles Blasdell	3:45
5.	"Could Be Me" (featuring Ne-Yo)	Kiriakou; Bogart; Goldstein; Ne-Yo	3:30
6.	"Forever Until Tomorrow"	Kiriakou; Bogart; Kelley; Max Martin; Rami Yacoub; Carl Falk; Savan Kotecha	3:46
7.	"Wasted"	Kiriakou; Bogart; Robbins; Oller	3:04
8.	"Heartbreak Holiday"	Kiriakou; Bogart; Robbins; Blasdell; Brandyn Burnette	3:39
9.	"Nowhere"	Kiriakou; Bogart; Goldstein; Kelley; Eric Bellinger	3:10
10.	"No More Second Chances" (featuring Jessica Ashley)	Kiriakou; Bogart; Kelley; Oller; Jens Koerkemeier; G. Holdcroft; Jessica Ashley	3:18
11.	"Goodbye Song"	Kiriakou; Bogart; Robbins	3:51

== Personnel ==
MKTO

- Malcolm David Kelley - vocals
- Tony Oller - vocals

== Charts ==
=== Weekly charts ===
Chart (2014)	Peak position
Australian Albums (ARIA)	1
New Zealand Albums (RMNZ)	6
Swedish Albums (Sverigetopplistan)	21
US Billboard 200	31

=== Year-end charts ===
Chart (2014)	Position
Australian Albums Chart	97

== Certifications ==
Region	Certification	Certified units/sales
Denmark (IFPI Danmark)	Platinum	20,000^{‡}
New Zealand (RMNZ)	2× Platinum	30,000^{‡}
^{‡} Sales+streaming figures based on certification alone.
