= Tonight You're Perfect =

Single by New Politlcs

from the album A Bad Girl in Harlem
- Released: October 15, 2013
- Recorded: 2012–2013
- Genre: Alternative rock, pop rock
- Length: 3:22
- Label: RCA
- Songwriter(s): New Politics
- Producer(s): Jake Sinclair

New Politlcs singles chronology
| "Harlem" (2013) | "Tonight You're Perfect" (2013) | "Everywhere I Go (Kings & Queens)" (2014) |

"Tonight You're Perfect" is a single by Danish rock band New Politics. It was released on October 15, 2013 through RCA records as the second and final single from their second album A Bad Girl in Harlem. It was written and composed by band members David Boyd and Søren Hansen and was produced by Jake Sinclair. The song received significant airplay on Alternative and Top-40 radio, alongside previous single Harlem, and peaked at No. 16 on the US Alternative Songs chart.

== Charts ==
| Chart (2013) | Peak position |
|---|---|
| US Adult Top 40 | 19 |
| US Alternative Songs | 16 |
| US Rock Songs | 25 |
