= How Can I Forget (MKTO song) =

2018 single by MKTO

Single by MKTO
- Released: August 22, 2018
- Genre: Pop
- Length: 2:57
- Label: Crooked Paintings; BMG
- Songwriters: Emanuel Kiriakou; Dag Lundberg; Malcolm David Kelley; Ray Jacobs; Lindy Robbins; E. Kidd Bogart
- Producers: Kiriakou; Lundberg; Andrew Goldstein

MKTO singles chronology
"Superstitious" (2016)	"How Can I Forget" (2018)	"Shoulda Known Better" (2019)

Music video
- "How Can I Forget" on YouTube

"How Can I Forget" is a single by American pop duo MKTO, released on August 22, 2018.

== Background ==
The song is about being unable to forget about one's partner in a previous relationship. Malcolm David Kelley stated that he "jumped in and out of a relationship" at the time he started the song. According to Tony Oller, the support they have received from fans and emotional connections formed with them also served as inspiration for the song. The song was written during MKTO's brief hiatus in 2017, and also as an ode to the fans who have not forgotten about them.

== Music video ==
The music video was directed by Izak Rappaport and released on September 7, 2018. It was inspired by Westworld and filmed at Point Dume in Malibu, California. It sees MKTO hooked up to machines that trigger memories from past relationships, and hanging out with their respective girlfriends at the beach.

== Charts ==
Chart performance for "How Can I Forget"
Chart (2018)	Peak position
Australia (ARIA Digital Track Chart)	38

== Certifications ==
Region	Certification	Certified units/sales
New Zealand (RMNZ)	Gold	15,000^{‡}
^{‡} Sales+streaming figures based on certification alone.
