= Now That's What I Call Music! 47 =

Now That's What I Call Music! 47 may refer to at least several different "Now That's What I Call Music!" series albums, including

- Now That's What I Call Music! 47 (UK series) (original UK series, 2000 release)
- Now That's What I Call Music! 47 (U.S. series) (U.S. series, 2013 release)
- Now That's What I Call Music! 47 (South African series) (South African series, 2007 release)
