= Yeah Yeah Yeah (New Politics song) =

Single by New Politlcs

from the album New Politics
- Released: 2010
- Genre: Alternative rock
- Length: 3:03
- Label: RCA Records
- Songwriters: David Boyd, Soren Hansen, Louis Vecchio

New Politlcs singles chronology
"Yeah Yeah Yeah" (2010)	"Dignity" (2010)

"Yeah Yeah Yeah" is the debut single by Danish rock band New Politics, released in 2010 from their self-titled debut studio album. It peaked at No. 45 on the Billboard Hot Rock Songs chart.

The song was written when the members first decided to form a band and is a continuation of the song "Monkey Funk". Guitarist Soren Hansen credits "Yeah Yeah Yeah" as well as Dignity as the reasons the band moved to America, and states he loves performing them live. Drummer Louis Vecchio recommends the song to someone first checking out the band.

Singer David Boyd climbs a wall in the music video for the song.

The song was featured on the soundtrack of the racing game Need for Speed: Hot Pursuit, as well as a 2010 Dell commercial.

== Charts ==
Chart (2010)	Peak position
US Hot Rock & Alternative Songs (Billboard)	45
US Rock & Alternative Airplay (Billboard)	45
