= American Dream (MKTO song) =

Single by MKTO

from the album MKTO
- Released: 17 April 2014
- Recorded: 2013
- Genre: Pop; pop rap
- Length: 3:45
- Songwriters: Emanuel Kiriakou; Evan Bogart; Andrew Goldstein; Lindy Robbins; Nathan Charles Blasdell
- Producer: Malcolm David Kelley

MKTO singles chronology
"God Only Knows" (2013)	"American Dream" (2014)	"Bad Girls" (2015)

"American Dream" is a song recorded by American musical duo MKTO. It was released in April 2014 as the fourth single from their debut album MKTO. It was commercially less successful than the previous three singles, however it still reached the top 20 in New Zealand and top 40 in Australia. American Dream refers to the national ethos of the United States.

== Music video ==
The music video for this single was released on 28 April 2014.

== Reviews ==
David Whiteway from Renowned For Sound gave the song 4 out 5, saying; "American Dream is a belter. [It] opens with the words "'do something with your life'" and [it has] a captivating hook and choral melody driven by massive pop sensibilities and their own excellent song writing skills. "

Jolt Magazine said: "This song is an uplifting song that begs you to listen to the lyrics about how the 'underdogs rise and the mighty fall'."

The song was also featured on an episode of the Nickelodeon TV show The Thundermans, sung by MKTO themselves as guest stars. They also performed the song on the ABC TV show Good Morning America.

== Charts ==
Chart (2014)	Peak position
Australia (ARIA)	40
Czech Republic Singles Digital (ČNS IFPI)	34
New Zealand (Recorded Music NZ)	12
US Pop Airplay (Billboard)	33

== Certifications ==
Region	Certification	Certified units/sales
Australia (ARIA)	Gold	35,000^{^}
New Zealand (RMNZ)	Platinum	30,000^{‡}
^{^} Shipments figures based on certification alone.^{‡} Sales+streaming figures based on certification alone.

== Release history ==
Release dates and formats for "American Dream"
Region	Date	Format	Label(s)	Ref.
United States	August 5, 2014	Mainstream airplay	Columbia	
