= Harlem (New Politics song) =

Single by New Politics

from the album A Bad Girl in Harlem
- Released: February 20, 2013
- Genre: Alternative rock, pop rock
- Length: 2:43
- Label: RCA
- Songwriters: David Boyd; Søren M. Hansen; Jake Sinclair; Mike Viola; Sadler Vaden; Jack Ploch; Nelson Ploch; Roger Ploch; Sam Ploch
- Producers: Jake Sinclair; Søren M. Hansen

New Politics singles chronology
"Dignity" (2010)	"Harlem" (2013)	"Tonight You're Perfect" (2013)

"Harlem" is a song by Danish alternative rock band New Politics, released as the first single from their second album A Bad Girl in Harlem on 20 February 2013, through RCA Records, and was accompanied by the release of a music video.

With a notably different style from their previous material, "Harlem" became a national hit in the United States, entering various records charts across the country. The song is widely considered to be their most successful single and their breakthrough into mainstream success.

== Background and release ==
Lyrically, "Harlem" was inspired by a romantic encounter which frontman David Boyd had with a girl from Harlem, a neighborhood in the Upper Manhattan region of New York City. In an interview with The Sun, Boyd explained, "Soren lived above some people and they had a party and that's where I met a girl from Harlem. The girl doesn't know this is about her, it was a bittersweet ending."

On February 20, 2013, "Harlem" was released through RCA Records as the first promotional single for the band's second album A Bad Girl in Harlem. An accompanying music video was uploaded to YouTube on the official New Politics channel the same day.

== Commercial performance ==
After its release, "Harlem" quickly became a hit song and began receiving significant radio airplay in the United States. Within just four days, "Harlem" entered the Billboard Alternative Songs chart, where it peaked at No. 4 and charted for 36 weeks. It remains their most successful single on that chart and all other Billboard charts to date. Later that year, "Harlem" began to enter several Top-40/CHR radio charts in the U.S., most notably the Billboard Bubbling Under Hot 100 where it peaked at number 10, and subsequently became their first song to impact Top-40 radio in the country. On June 29, 2017, "Harlem" received a gold certification from the Recording Industry Association of America, marking track-equivalent sales of 500,000 units in the US and making it their first and only song to date to receive any certification.

== Usage in media ==
"Harlem" was featured in a trailer for the 2013 animated musical-comedy film Frozen. It also appeared in the EA game NHL 14, the Activision game Guitar Hero Live, a Taco Bell commercial, and a Windows 8.1 commercial. It is also featured as a "Now! What's Next" bonus track on Now That's What I Call Music! 48.

== Charts ==
=== Weekly charts ===
Weekly chart performance for "Harlem"
Chart (2013–2014)	Peak position
Canada Rock (Billboard)	27
US Bubbling Under Hot 100 (Billboard)	10
US Adult Pop Airplay (Billboard)	39
US Hot Rock & Alternative Songs (Billboard)	21
US Pop Airplay (Billboard)	34
US Rock & Alternative Airplay (Billboard)	7

=== Year-end charts ===
Year-end chart performance for "Harlem"
Chart (2013)	Peak position
US Hot Rock Songs (Billboard)	31
US Rock Airplay (Billboard)	14

== Certifications ==
Certifications for "Harlem"
Region	Certification	Certified units/sales
United States (RIAA)	Gold	500,000^{‡}
^{‡} Sales+streaming figures based on certification alone.
