= Now That's What I Call Music! 49 =

Now That's What I Call Music! 49 or Now 49 may refer to both Now That's What I Call Music! series albums, including

- Now That's What I Call Music! 49 (UK series)
- Now That's What I Call Music! 49 (U.S. series)
