= New Politics (album) =

Studio album by New Politics
- Released: July 12, 2010
- Recorded: 2010
- Studio: Hillside Manor (Hollywood, Los Angeles); Mission Sound Recording (New York City, New York); Sound City (Van Nuys, California); Sunset Sound (Hollywood, Los Angeles)
- Genre: Alternative rock; punk rock; rap rock
- Length: 31:08
- Label: RCA
- Producer: Dave Sardy; Jon Kaplan; David Boyd; Søren Hansen; Louis Vecchio

New Politics chronology
New Politics (2010)	A Bad Girl in Harlem (2013)

Singles from New Politics
- 1. "Yeah Yeah Yeah" Released: April 23, 2010; 2. "Dignity" Released: December 7, 2010; 3. "Give Me Hope" Released: 2011

Professional ratings
Review scores
Source	Rating
AllMusic	2/5 stars
Melodic	3/5 stars

New Politics is the debut studio album by Danish rock band New Politics. It was released on July 12, 2010, through RCA, and produced the singles “Yeah Yeah Yeah" and "Dignity”, which charted moderately on the Billboard Alternative Airplay and Hot Rock Songs charts. Much of the recording was done at studios within the Los Angeles area and in New York City, and production was primarily handled by the bandmates themselves along with several other producers.

== Track listing ==
All tracks are written by David Boyd, Søren Hansen, and Poul Amaliel

No.	Title	Length
1.	"Yeah Yeah Yeah"	3:03
2.	"Dignity"	3:15
3.	"Give Me Hope"	2:48
4.	"Love Is a Drug"	3:15
5.	"Nuclear War"	3:05
6.	"Burn"	2:15
7.	"My Love"	3:22
8.	"We Are the Radio"	3:36
9.	"Die for You"	3:01
10.	"New Generation"	3:34
Total length:		31:08
