= Now That's What I Call Music! 48 (American series) =

Compilation album by various artists
- Released: November 11, 2013
- Length: 74:38
- Label: Universal Music Enterprises

Numbered series chronology
Now That's What I Call Music! 47 (2013)	Now That's What I Call Music! 48 (2013)	Now That's What I Call Music! 49 (2014)

Now That's What I Call Music! 48, released on November 11, 2013, is the 48th edition of the Now! series in the United States. The album features two songs which reached number one on the US Billboard Hot 100: "Roar" and "Blurred Lines".

Now 48 debuted at No. 3 on the Billboard 200 albums chart with first-week sales of 114,000 copies. It is the first album in the series to top 100,000 units in a week since Now 43 did so in its debut week in August 2012.

The Target edition contained a bonus disc titled Now What's Next, featuring 10 songs by emerging artists. This concept was previously used on Now 10.

== Track listing ==
No.	Title	Artist	Length
1.	"Roar"	Katy Perry	3:42
2.	"Blurred Lines"	Robin Thicke featuring T.I. and Pharrell Williams	4:21
3.	"Take Back the Night"	Justin Timberlake	5:53
4.	"Summertime Sadness" (Cedric Gervais Remix Edit)	Lana Del Rey	3:33
5.	"Get Lucky"	Daft Punk featuring Pharrell Williams	4:07
6.	"Treasure"	Bruno Mars	2:54
7.	"Love Somebody"	Maroon 5	3:47
8.	"Wake Me Up"	Avicii	4:04
9.	"We Can't Stop"	Miley Cyrus	3:49
10.	"Applause"	Lady Gaga	3:30
11.	"Slow Down"	Selena Gomez	3:28
12.	"Everything Has Changed"	Taylor Swift featuring Ed Sheeran	4:03
13.	"Brave"	Sara Bareilles	3:37
14.	"Still Into You"	Paramore	3:34
15.	"Sail"	Awolnation	4:18
16.	"That's My Kind of Night"	Luke Bryan	3:11
17.	"Harlem"	New Politics	2:42
18.	"I Believe"	Basic Vacation	3:16
19.	"Drunken Hearts"	Wallpaper	3:36
20.	"On Our Way"	The Royal Concept	3:13

Now What's Next track listing
No.	Title	Artist	Length
1.	"Somebody Loves You"	Betty Who	3:34
2.	"Lanterns"	Birds of Tokyo	3:54
3.	"Sex"	The 1975	3:25
4.	"Finders Keepers"	Miriam Bryant	3:25
5.	"Melodies"	Madison Beer	3:30
6.	"Be Okay"	Oh Honey	3:17
7.	"Love On Fire"	Alex Aiono	3:43
8.	"Say Yes"	B5	3:52
9.	"Crazy Stupid Love"	My Crazy Girlfriend	3:17
10.	"I Love You"	Said the Whale	2:45
