= Now That's What I Call Music! 47 (American series) =

Compilation album by various artists
- Released: August 6, 2013
- Length: 71:17
- Label: Sony Music

Numbered series chronology
Now That's What I Call Music! 46 (2013)	Now That's What I Call Music! 47 (2013)	Now That's What I Call Music! 48 (2013)

Now That's What I Call Music! 47, released on August 6, 2013, is the 47th edition of the Now! series in the United States. The album features the number-one Billboard Hot 100 hit, "When I Was Your Man", by Bruno Mars.

Now! 47 debuted at number two on the Billboard 200 albums chart with sales of 82,000 copies in its first week of release.

== Track listing ==
No.	Title	Artist	Length
1.	"I Love It"	Icona Pop featuring Charli XCX	2:33
2.	"Mirrors"	Justin Timberlake	4:36
3.	"#Beautiful"	Mariah Carey featuring Miguel	3:19
4.	"Come & Get It"	Selena Gomez	3:50
5.	"Radioactive"	Imagine Dragons	3:06
6.	"When I Was Your Man"	Bruno Mars	3:31
7.	"Beneath Your Beautiful"	Labrinth featuring Emeli Sandé	4:30
8.	"Clarity"	Zedd featuring Foxes	4:27
9.	"I Need Your Love"	Calvin Harris featuring Ellie Goulding	3:50
10.	"The Other Side"	Jason Derulo	3:45
11.	"Crazy Kids" (Remix)	Kesha featuring Juicy J	3:49
12.	"Cups" (Pitch Perfect's "When I'm Gone")	Anna Kendrick	2:05
13.	"Safe and Sound"	Capital Cities	3:10
14.	"Heart Attack"	Demi Lovato	3:28
15.	"22"	Taylor Swift	3:47
16.	"Here's to Never Growing Up"	Avril Lavigne	3:37
17.	"This Is the New Year"	A Great Big World	3:12
18.	"Glowing"	Nikki Williams	4:05
19.	"Take Me Home"	Midnight Red	3:33
20.	"Classic"	MKTO	2:55

== Reception ==
Professional ratings
Review scores
Source	Rating
Allmusic	3/5 stars

Andy Kellman of Allmusic notes the continued dominance of "bulky but swift dance-pop" in Now! 47 with country and rap being virtually shut out.

== Chart performance ==
Chart (2013)	Peak position
US Billboard 200	2
US Top Digital Albums (Billboard)	7
