= Lost in Translation (New Politics album) =

Lost In Translation

Studio album by New Politics
- Released: October 6, 2017
- Recorded: 2016–2017
- Genre: Alternative rock; pop rock; dance-rock; indie rock
- Length: 34:55
- Label: DCD2; Warner Bros.
- Producer: Tobias Karlsson; Butch Walker; Kenneth Aaron Harris

New Politics chronology
Vikings (2015)	Lost In Translation (2017)	An Invitation to an Alternate Reality (2019)

Singles from Lost in Translation
- 1. "One Of Us" Released: June 17, 2017; 2. "CIA" Released: August 2, 2017; 3. "Color Green" Released: August 23, 2017; 4. "Madeleine" Released: September 13, 2017; 5. "Lifeboat" Released: September 27, 2017

Lost In Translation is the fourth studio album by Danish rock band New Politics, released on October 6, 2017 via DCD2 Records and Warner Bros. Records. Five singles were released prior to the album's release, along with a music video for "One Of Us". The band announced that the new album would focus on life after touring and growing more successful, as well as describing the task of reinventing themselves through the tight bonds that they developed as bandmates over the years.

== Track listing ==
No.	Title	Writer(s)	Producer(s)	Length
1.	"CIA"	Tobias Karlsson; David Boyd; Søren Hansen; Louis Vecchio	Karlsson	3:13
2.	"One of Us"	Butch Walker; Boyd; David Schuler; Hansen; Vecchio	Walker	4:20
3.	"Tell Your Dad" (featuring Rivers Cuomo)	Boyd; Rivers Cuomo; Hansen; Vecchio; Karlson	Karlsson	3:20
4.	"Madeleine"	Walker; Boyd; Hansen; Vecchio	Walker	3:34
5.	"Color Green"	Karlsson; Boyd; Hansen; Vecchio	Karlsson	4:34
6.	"Lifeboat"	Boyd; Hansen; Vecchio	Hansen	3:03
7.	"Lifted"	Walker; Boyd; Hansen; Vecchio	Walker	3:24
8.	"Istanbul"	Boyd; Hansen; Vecchio	Hansen	3:20
9.	"East Coast Thrilla"	Boyd; Hansen; Vecchio	Kenneth Aaron Harris	2:43
10.	"Clouds"	Walker; Boyd; Hansen; Vecchio	Walker	3:24
Total length:				34:55

== Chart positions ==
=== Singles ===
List of singles, with selected chart positions
Title	Year	Peak chart positions	
Title	Year	US Alt.	US Rock
"One of Us"	2017	10	40
"CIA"	2017	—	—
"—" denotes a recording that did not chart.
