= A Bad Girl in Harlem =

Studio album by New Politics
- Released: May 21, 2013
- Studio: Mission Sound in Brooklyn, New York; RubyRed Productions in Santa Monica, California
- Genre: Alternative rock, pop rock
- Length: 33:00
- Label: RCA
- Producer: Joakim Åhlund; Søren Hansen; Jon Kaplan; Jake Sinclair; Oliver Straus

New Politics chronology
New Politics (2010)	A Bad Girl in Harlem (2013)	Vikings (2015)

Singles from A Bad Girl in Harlem
- 1. "Harlem" Released: March 9, 2013; 2. "Tonight You're Perfect" Released: October 15, 2013

Professional ratings
Review scores
Source	Rating
AllMusic	2/5 stars
The Arkansas Traveler	5.5/10

A Bad Girl in Harlem is the second studio album by Danish rock band New Politics, released on May 21, 2013 via RCA Records. The three members moved from Copenhagen to Brooklyn, where the material was recorded. Two singles were released, titled "Harlem" and "Tonight You're Perfect". Allmusic.com called the album 'hooky, infectious pop'.

The track "Harlem" was featured in a 2013 Taco Bell commercial, a Windows 8 commercial, several Frozen trailers, Guitar Hero Live, NHL 14 and promotional spots for America's Got Talent.

== Track listing ==
All tracks are written by David Boyd, Søren Hansen, and Louis Vecchio

No.	Title	Length
1.	"Tonight You're Perfect"	3:22
2.	"Harlem"	2:43
3.	"Berlin"	3:11
4.	"Stuck On You"	3:42
5.	"Give Me Hope"	2:48
6.	"Die Together"	3:57
7.	"Goodbye Copenhagen"	3:22
8.	"Overcome"	3:35
9.	"Just Like Me"	2:36
10.	"Fall Into These Arms"	3:44

== Reception ==
The album received mixed reviews, with AllMusic editor Gregory Heaney giving the album 2 out of 5 stars, citing the band's presentation was "feeling a bit overproduced" and that the album "ultimately ends up feeling overcooked", though the same review did praise songs like "Die Together" and "Just Like Me".
