= Vikings (album) =

Studio album by New Politics
- Released: August 14, 2015
- Recorded: 2014–2015
- Genre: Alternative rock; pop rock; dance-rock
- Length: 44:53
- Label: DCD2, Warner Bros.
- Producer: Søren Hansen; Laurent Jaccoux; Tim Pagnotta; Ricky Reed; John Ryan; Jake Sinclair; Joe Trohman

New Politics chronology
A Bad Girl in Harlem (2013)	Vikings (2015)	Lost in Translation (2017)

Singles from Vikings
- 1. "Everywhere I Go (Kings & Queens)" Released: September 2, 2014; 2. "West End Kids" Released: May 11, 2015; 3. "Girl Crush" Released: November 26, 2015

Vikings is the third studio album by Danish rock band New Politics, released on August 14, 2015 via DCD2 Records and Warner Bros. Records. Three singles were released, titled "Everywhere I Go (Kings & Queens)", "West End Kids" and "Girl Crush". "West End Kids" is featured in the video game NHL 16 and "Everywhere I Go (Kings & Queens)" is featured in the video game Tony Hawk's Pro Skater 5, The Sims 4: Get to Work and a trailer for the 2016 Amazon Prime series The Tick.

== Track listing ==
All tracks are written by David Boyd, Søren Hansen, and Louis Vecchio.

No.	Title	Length
1.	"Everywhere I Go (Kings & Queens)"	3:25
2.	"West End Kids"	3:32
3.	"Girl Crush"	2:54
4.	"Lovers in a Song"	3:11
5.	"15 Dreams"	3:04
6.	"50 Feet Tall"	3:30
7.	"Pretend We're in a Movie"	3:15
8.	"Loyalties Among Thieves"	3:12
9.	"Stardust"	3:40
10.	"Aristocrat"	3:16
11.	"Strings Attached" (track ends at 1:39, first hidden track "Bitch I'm Gold" at 5:00 and second hidden track "LSD" at 11:07)	11:55
Total length:		44:54

== Charts ==
Chart (2015)	Peak position
US Billboard 200	129
US Top Rock Albums (Billboard)	16

=== Singles ===
Title	Year	Peak chart positions	
Title	Year	US Alt.	US Rock
"Everywhere I Go (Kings & Queens)"	2014	19	28
"West End Kids"	2015	25	—
"Girl Crush"	2015	31	—
"—" denotes a recording that did not chart.
