= Tiffany Houghton =

American singer-songwriter from Dallas (born 1993)

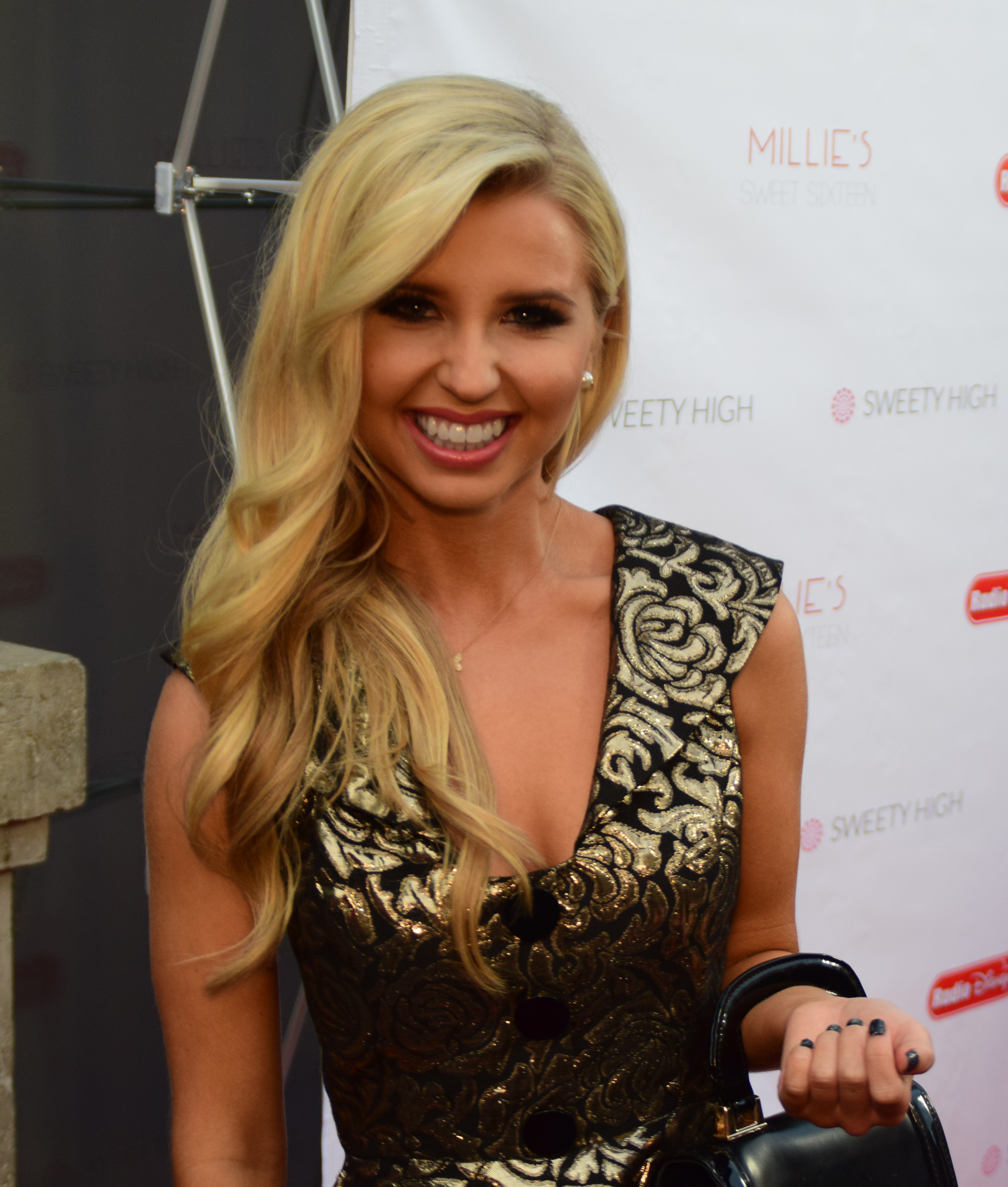

Background information
- Born: Tiffany Crystal Houghton; 6 December 1993 (age 32); Dallas, TX, U.S.
- Genres: Pop, country
- Occupations: Singer, songwriter
- Instruments: Guitar, vocals, piano
- Years active: 2011-2021
- Labels: Crowd Surf, Instar
- Spouse: Adam Moffitt
- Website: tiffanyhoughton.com

Tiffany Crystal Houghton (born December 6, 1993) is an American singer-songwriter. As a pop artist, she has released several singles. In 2014, she toured with the musical act MKTO. As a child and young teenager, Houghton lived in New York City, had some work in television and commercials, and was the alternate child actor and singer for the musical Annie. She was inspired by singer Kristin Chenoweth who visited her school. At seventeen, she moved to the country music city, Nashville, to gain experience, make connections, and work on her act.

In 2018, Houghton released the single "Pretty Pretty" in advance of a promised new album.

== Tiffany Houghton (EP) ==
In 2012, Houghton released her first, self-titled, Ep, Tiffany Houghton. Houghton has since removed the county album from all streaming platforms. The Ep featured the songs, Only One, Hundred & One, Like He Treats Her, Different, If You Won't Hold Me, and Make Me Stay.

== Journalism ==
In 2013 Houghton released her first album, Journalism. Like Tiffany Houghton (EP) the album has since been removed from all streaming platforms. The album features 8 songs and no music videos.

Title	Length
Hey Boy	2:57
IKE	3:29
Except For You	3:50
Never Mine To Lose	3:17
Fight For Us	2:51
Miss Me At Midnight	2:56
Never Been Better	2:36
Glitter	3:35

== This Is Not An EP ==
On December 1, 2014 Houghton released her first studio EP with songs Love Like That, Phone Call, Blame It On The Snow, The Best, High, and (Bonus Track) Island. Shortly after its release, High became Houghton's most successful hit acquiring over one million streams on YouTube alone.

Title	Length	Release date
Love Like That	3:19	September 11, 2014
The Best	2:52	August 5, 2014
Phone Call	3:01	December 10, 2013
High	3:00	August 13, 2013
Blame It On the Snow	4:20	December 2, 2014
Island (Bonus Track)	3:43	December 1, 2014

== Catch Me If You Can ==
Only a few months after the release of This Is Not An EP, Houghton released her second EP, Catch Me If You Can. The Ep featured the songs Unstoppable, Band Boy, Go Love Yourself, Catch Me If You Can, Clueless, and Therapy.

Being the first single from the album, Houghton released "Catch Me If You Can" exclusively on Radio Disney. Within 24 hours, the song peaked at #1 and was the most requested song of the day and held that position for a while.

Title	Length	Release date
Unstoppable	2:59	July 21, 2015
Catch Me If You Can	3:24	July 21, 2015
Band Boy	2:45	July 21, 2015
Clueless	3:04	July 21, 2015
Go Love Yourself	3:37	July 21, 2015
Therapy	3:29	July 21, 2015

== Singles ==
Even though Houghton has released the majority of her tracks on albums or EPs, there have been a few songs to slip though the cracks and remain singles.

Title	Length	Release date
House On Normandy (deleted single)	3:59	October 29, 2012
17 Again	3:41	March 17, 2014
I'm Gonna Love You	3:03	October 14, 2016
Hello Sailor!	3:05	December 2, 2016
Echoes (feat. Cody William Falkosky)	3:37	November 2, 2018
Get To Lovin' (feat. That Girl Lay Lay)	3:03	June 28, 2019
Pretty Pretty (feat. JTM)	3:10	October 18, 2019
Mrs. Claus (feat. Tiffany Alvord)	3:54	December 6, 2019
Mrs. Claus (Acoustic)	4:21	December 13, 2019
Better Without a Sweater (feat. Jay Alan)	2:54	November 27, 2020

== Slumber Party ==
On April 16, 2021 Houghton released her long awaited for album Slumber Party, the album featured the previously released singles Pretty Pretty, Break Me, Physical, Spectrum, Candace, What'd Do?, Why, and Dodged a Bullet. The album features music videos for Get To Lovin', Why, and Dodged a Bullet. In an interview with Xavier from Heard Well Houghton claimed, "All these records I made, produced, wrote, entirely with women."

Title	Length	Release date
Get to Lovin'	3:03	April 16, 2021
Skydive	3:07	April 16, 2021
Slumber Party	3:15	April 16, 2021
Candace, What'd You Do?	3:31	April 3, 2020
Break Me	3:09	January 18, 2019
Physical	2:50	November 19, 2018
Fake	2:26	April 16, 2021
Ferrari	2:31	April 16, 2021
Pretty Pretty	3:10	November 12, 2018
Why	3:55	January 31, 2020
Spectrum	3:18	July 17, 2020
Dodged a Bullet	2:55	September 4, 2020
