= New politics (Scotland) =

Political slogan in Scotland

The logo used by the pro-devolution campaign in the 1997 Scottish devolution referendum, urging voters to embrace "new politics".

"New politics" was the term widely-used by the Scottish home rule movement and the Scottish Press to describe Scottish devolution before, during, and immediately after the 1997 Scottish devolution referendum. According to Professor James Mitchell of the University of Edinburgh, the term "was never precisely defined", but implied several features within the rhetoric of pro-devolution campaign groups. These included:

- New political institutions, the most obvious being the Scottish Parliament
- A new semi-proportional electoral system, adopting the additional-member system instead of the first-past-the-post used in UK general elections
- Consociational, "consensus politics" (as opposed to the confrontational style of debate found in the House of Commons)
- Increased involvement of civil society in governance, through "Civic Forums", consultations, and e-petitions as part of a wider emphasis on popular sovereignty
- Increased transparency regarding political lobbying, historically made towards the Scotland Office
- Greater representation of women in politics and fairer political institutions (e.g., family friendly opening hours, childcare provision), at a time when fewer than 10% of MPs were women

"New politics" rode on an atmosphere of social and political change in Scotland after the stagnation and decline of the Thatcher years. It was attached to a wider 1990s cultural revival in anticipation of the new millennium, similar to Cool Britannia in England and exemplified by films like Trainspotting, Glasgow's status as European City of Culture in 1990, new musical acts like Primal Scream and Belle and Sebastian and a booming rave scene.

== History of the term ==
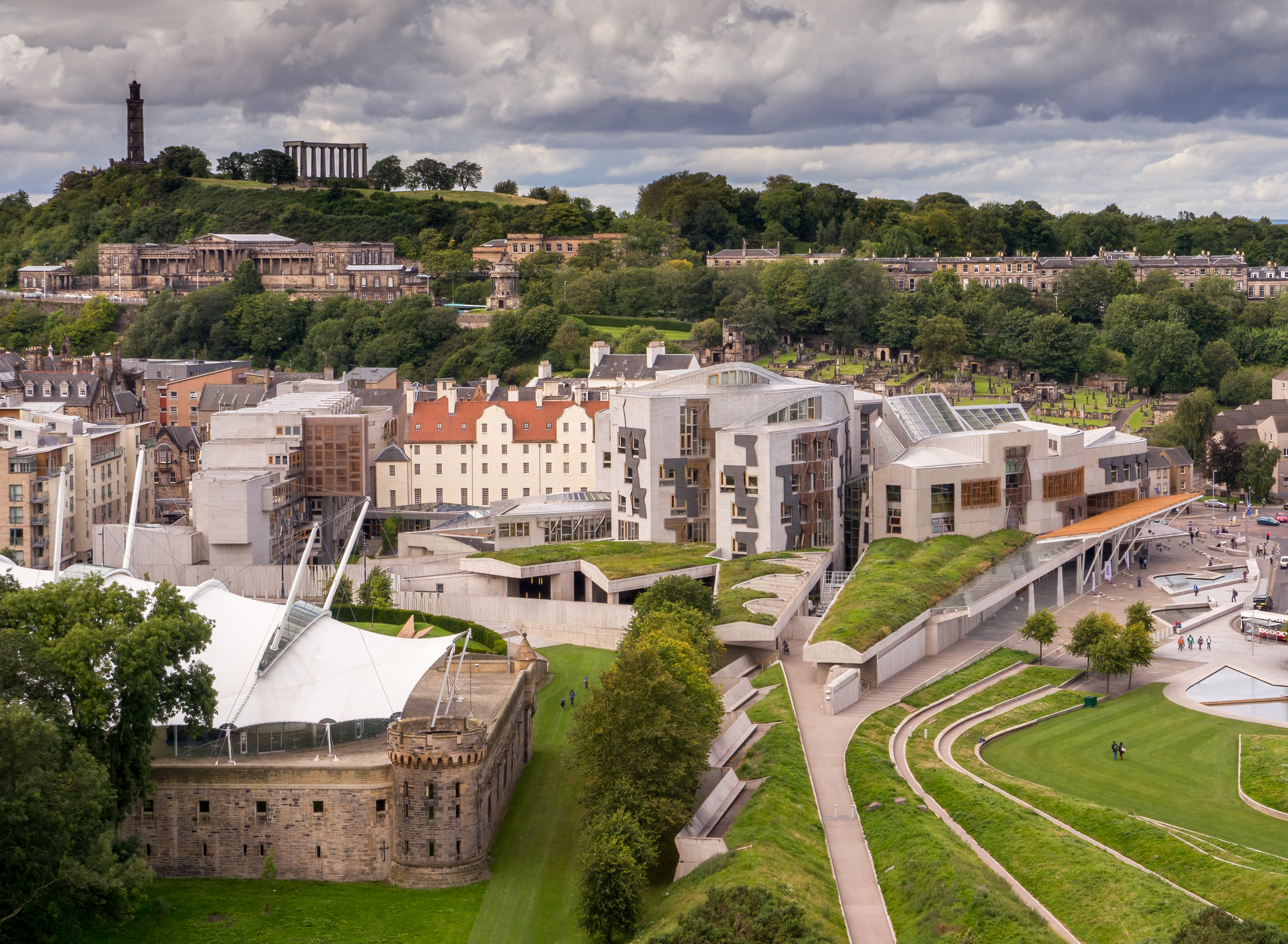
The new Scottish Parliament Building in central Edinburgh, completed in 2004 and emblematic of "new politics" with its postmodern design

The term "new politics" was previously used by the US Democratic Party to refer to their policy platform in the 1950s, particularly under the leadership of Adlai Stevenson II. It is unclear whether the Scottish and American uses of the term are linked.

While the Scottish National Party (SNP) has been the primary political vehicle for Scottish home rule since the 1930s, the term "new politics" was more closely associated with the Scottish Constitutional Convention (SCC), established 1989. This included delegates from trade unions, local authorities, churches, and members of both the Labour and Liberal Democrat parties. The election of Tony Blair in 1997, who had campaigned on the manifesto pledge of a devolution referendum for Scotland and Wales, entrenched the term within New Labour's wider narrative.

Academics and politicians were quick to adopt the term and variations on it. Pre-emptively reflecting on the era, Rev. Kenyon Wright asked in May 1998 whether the new Scottish Parliament would "be the pioneer of the new kind of politics that the new era so desperately needs". His interpretation of new politics was post-nationalist, implying increased European integration.

Meanwhile, Prof. Michael Keating of the University of Aberdeen linked the "new politics" of 1990s Scotland to forward-thinking nationalist revivals occurring simultaneously in Catalonia and Quebec.

In his writings, the Scottish Parliament's inaugural First Minister, Donald Dewar, strongly emphasised new politics' principle of public participation in policy-making, following the results of the 1997 devolution referendum.

As part of new politics' emphasis on "consensus", in October 1999 the then-leaders of Scottish Labour and the SNP, Donald Dewar and Alex Salmond, shared a pro-Euro platform alongside members of the Liberal Democrats. Similarly, the 1997 devolution campaign was headed by members of the Labour, Liberal Democrat, and Scottish National Parties.

== Criticisms of the term ==
The logo of the anti-devolution campaign in the 1997 Scottish devolution referendum, headed by former Conservative Party employee Brian Monteith

Part of the SNP's initial distance towards "new politics" was that, while broadly supporting Scottish devolution, the party's fundamental vision has always been of a fully independent Scotland. Hence, while still part of the Union, the party did not view devolution as anything particularly "new". Under the leadership of Gordon Wilson and Jim Sillars, the SNP withdrew from the SCC in the early-1990s because of its unwillingness to discuss Scottish independence.

The Conservative Party had long opposed Scottish devolution, and therefore were unwilling to join the Constitutional Convention nor adopt the term "new politics".

Professor James Mitchell was one of the first to retrospectively critique the term in a 2000 article in Parliamentary Affairs. His critique largely rested on the idea that, as the "child" of Westminster, the devolved Scottish Parliament and subsequent political culture were not overwhelmingly different from that of the UK. Moreover, an emphasis on cooperation in government could not surpass the real and often bitter party competition between Scotland's three main political parties, the SNP, Labour, and the Conservatives, as well as their core ideological differences.

Writing eight years on from Mitchell, however, Dr. Robin T. Pettitt of Kingston University argued that within the Scottish Parliament, "legislative power is far more spread out ... than it is in Westminster", leading to "a less hostile political environment". Given its semi-proportional electoral system, he described Scotland's devolved institutions as a "halfway house" between the Westminster system and the Nordic model. Pettitt argued that against initial controversy surrounding the term, the verdict is still out on the efficacy of "new politics".

Some media commentators at the time were also critical of the term, in particular Andrew Neil, then-editor of The Scotsman. Neil disagreed with the SCC's vision of a consensus-driven Scottish Parliament, arguing that "If there is to be a new politics in Scotland, then it must be the politics of fresh thinking, of good ideas celebrated and bad ideas shot down. It must be robust and full of life and invention, not dreary and consensual."
