= Alex Roots =

British singer (born 1992)

- Born: 25 August 1992 (age 34)
- Genre: Pop
- Occupation: Singer
- Instrument: Vocals
- Years active: 2008–2009
- Label: Good Groove

Alex Roots (born 25 August 1992) is a British singer born in London. She released her debut single, "Don't Stop Looking" in 2009. It was written by Roots and British record producer and songwriter Ryan Laubscher, who has also worked with Pixie Lott.

== Music career ==
Alex Roots signed a deal with Good Groove Records in 2009. Her debut album Adrenaline Rush was released later that year.

She performed some of the songs from the album while being the opening act for McFly for the first two tour dates of their Up Close... And This Time, It's Personal Tour. Her song, "Dizzy from the Ride" is the theme song for the TeenNick show, Gigantic.
