= Classic (MKTO song) =

Single by MKTO

from the album MKTO
- Released: June 20, 2013
- Recorded: 2013
- Genre: Funk; pop
- Length: 2:55
- Label: Columbia
- Songwriters: Evan "Kidd" Bogart; Andrew Goldstein; Emanuel Kiriakou; Lindy Robbins
- Producers: Emanuel Kiriakou; Evan Bogart

MKTO singles chronology
"Thank You" (2012)	"Classic" (2013)	"God Only Knows" (2013)

"Classic" is a song by the American pop music duo MKTO. Written by Evan "Kidd" Bogart, Andrew Goldstein, Emanuel Kiriakou, and Lindy Robbins, "Classic" was first released on June 20, 2013 as the second single from the duo's self-titled debut album.

== Background and release ==
After securing a recording contract with Columbia Records in 2012, MKTO began recording material for their self-titled debut album in 2013, with American singer-songwriter, Ne-Yo and Swedish record producer, Max Martin among some of their collaborators. "Classic" was eventually chosen as the follow-up to the duo's top ten hit, "Thank You" and released as the second single from their debut album in June 2013. In the lead-up to the single's release in the United States, MKTO served as the opening act for Emblem3 during their tour in the summer and also visited the Billboard office, where they previewed tracks from their debut album, which had not yet been released at the time.

== Reception ==
The song received positive reviews from critics and fans. BrentMusicReviews gave it 5/5 stars and called it "MKTO don't reinvent the wheel, but deliver worthwhile pop music". Matt Collar from AllMusic gave a positive review and stated: "Featuring the talents of actor/musicians Malcolm Kelly and Tony Oller, MKTO's full-length debut album, 2014's eponymous MKTO, is an exuberant and catchy mix of dancey, hip-hop-infused pop, rock, and R&B." The song featured on the American version of Now That's What I Call Music! 47 almost a whole year before it reached national success. The song sold 76,000 downloads in the US in 2013 according to Nielsen SoundScan. It has sold 742,000 downloads in the US up to date.

== Music video ==
The song's accompanying music video was directed by Josh Forbes and was released alongside the single. In MKTO: The Making of Classic, the duo reveals that the video explores "bringing back the classic feel". Band member Tony Oller elaborates further by saying, "The whole concept is about going back in time and reliving those great classic moments". The video begins with MKTO walking into a club, where they meet a few girls and take them to a magical photo booth that transforms the girls' outfits into dresses that were worn back in the different "classical" eras.

== Chart performance ==
"Classic" was a commercial success in Oceania, peaking at number eight in New Zealand and number nine in Australia, becoming the duo's second top 10 hit in both nations. It has been certified Gold by Recorded Music NZ (RMNZ) for sales in excess of 7,500 copies and 2× Platinum by the Australian Recording Industry Association (ARIA), denoting shipments in excess of 140,000 copies. In the United States, "Classic" debuted at number 96 on the US Billboard Hot 100, becoming MKTO's first single to chart in North America. It peaked at number 14, becoming the group's first top 20 hit in the US. In addition to the Hot 100, "Classic" has also peaked at number eight on the US Mainstream Top 40, becoming the duo's first top 10 hit on this chart. In June 2014, the song surpassed the one million mark in digital sales and was subsequently certified Double Platinum by the Recording Industry Association of America (RIAA).

== Charts ==
=== Weekly charts ===
Weekly chart performance for "Classic"
Chart (2013–2014)	Peak position
Australia (ARIA)	9
Belgium (Ultratip Bubbling Under Flanders)	9
Bulgaria (IFPI)	37
Canada Hot 100 (Billboard)	61
Canada CHR/Top 40 (Billboard)	31
Czech Republic Singles Digital (ČNS IFPI)	13
Finland (Suomen virallinen lista)	35
Hungary (Rádiós Top 40)	8
Hungary (Single Top 40)	39
Ireland (IRMA)	28
Latvia (EHR)	6
Netherlands (Dutch Top 40 Tiparade)	5
Netherlands (Single Top 100)	64
New Zealand (Recorded Music NZ)	8
Russia Airplay (Tophit)	217
Scottish Singles Sales (Official Charts)	19
Slovakia Singles Digital (ČNS IFPI)	32
South Korea International Singles (GAON)	153
Sweden (Sverigetopplistan)	7
UK Singles (Official Charts)	24
US Billboard Hot 100	14
US Adult Contemporary (Billboard)	26
US Adult Pop Airplay (Billboard)	12
US Pop Airplay (Billboard)	8

2021–2025 weekly chart performance for "Classic"
Chart (2021–2025)	Peak position
Austria (Ö3 Austria Top 40)	59
Germany (GfK)	78
Global 200 (Billboard)	116
Switzerland (Schweizer Hitparade)	93

=== Year-end charts ===
2013 year-end chart performance for "Classic"
Chart (2013)	Position
Australia (ARIA)	38
New Zealand (Recorded Music NZ)	41

2014 year-end chart performance for "Classic"
Chart (2014)	Position
Hungary (Rádiós Top 40)	43
Sweden (Sverigetopplistan)	28
US Billboard Hot 100	50
US Mainstream Top 40 (Billboard)	31

== Certifications ==
Certifications for "Classic"
Region	Certification	Certified units/sales
Australia (ARIA)	3× Platinum	210,000^{^}
Canada (Music Canada)	Platinum	80,000^{*}
Denmark (IFPI Danmark)	3× Platinum	270,000^{‡}
Germany (BVMI)	Gold	150,000^{‡}
Italy (FIMI)	Platinum	100,000^{‡}
New Zealand (RMNZ)	7× Platinum	210,000^{‡}
Spain (Promusicae)	Gold	30,000^{‡}
Sweden (GLF)	Platinum	40,000^{‡}
United Kingdom (BPI)	3× Platinum	1,800,000^{‡}
United States (RIAA)	2× Platinum	2,000,000^{‡}
Streaming
Denmark (IFPI Danmark)	Platinum	2,600,000^{†}
Japan (RIAJ)	Gold	50,000,000^{†}
^{*} Sales figures based on certification alone.^{^} Shipments figures based on certification alone.^{‡} Sales+streaming figures based on certification alone.^{†} Streaming-only figures based on certification alone.

== Release history ==
Release dates and formats for "Classic"
Region	Date	Format	Label(s)	Ref.
United States	November 12, 2013	Mainstream airplay	Columbia	
