= Adrenaline Rush (film) =

Adrenaline Rush: The Science of Risk
- Cover of DVD release
- Directed by: Marc Fafard
- Written by: Marc Fafard
- Produced by: Carl Samson
- Starring: Charles Bryan; Jon Devore; George Morris; Adrian Nicholas; Katarina Olikainen; Mike Vail
- Cinematography: Peter Anderson; Peter Degerfeldt; Göran Widenby
- Distributed by: Giant Screen Films (Americas and Asia); Staffan Forsell (Europe)
- Release date: October 18, 2002
- Running time: 40 minutes
- Country: Canada
- Language: English

Adrenaline Rush: The Science of Risk is a 2002 IMAX documentary film that explores the human biology behind risk-taking—why it gives some people such a powerful physical lift, and why the human mind and body craves danger. In addition, filmmaker Marc Fafard presents an up-close look at two of the most dangerous and exciting human pastimes: parachuting and base-jumping. The Globe and Mail gave it a rating of.
