= Gigantic (TV series) =

- Genre: Comedy drama
- Created by: Ben Wolfinsohn; Debby Wolfinsohn
- Starring: Grace Gummer; Tony Oller; Ryan Rottman; Jolene Purdy; Malcolm David Kelley; Gia Mantegna
- Opening theme: "Dizzy From the Ride" by Alex Roots
- Composer: Robert ToTeras
- Country of origin: United States
- Original language: English
- No. of seasons: 1
- No. of episodes: 18

Production
- Executive producers: Marti Noxon; Dawn Parouse Olmstead
- Producer: Amy Sydorick
- Cinematography: Greg Harrington
- Camera setup: Single camera
- Running time: 30 minutes (with commercials)
- Production companies: Reveille Productions; Grady Twins Productions; Pacific Bay Entertainment

Original release
- Network: TeenNick
- Release: October 8, 2010 – April 22, 2011

Gigantic is an American comedy-drama television series created by Ben and Debby Wolfinsohn. It was produced by Reveille Productions, Grady Twins Productions, and Pacific Bay Entertainment. The series aired on TeenNick from October 8, 2010 to April 22, 2011.

On April 19, 2011, the series was cancelled after one season.

== Premise ==
Gigantic revolves around 17-year-old Anna Moore (Grace Gummer) and her younger brother Walt (Tony Oller), teens who live the lives of Hollywood "it" kids as the children of famous movie star couple John and Jennifer Moore. Anna and Walt have recently returned to Los Angeles after living in Australia for the past two years while their parents were shooting a movie. The series takes a fictional look at the complicated lives of children of Hollywood celebrities, giving an insider view of the glitz, glamour, and A-list parties of Tinseltown. It exposes the life behind the tabloids and gossip blogs, while exploring the difficulties of growing up with superstar parents.

Two stars of the series are real-life children of Hollywood celebrities. Grace Gummer is the daughter of Meryl Streep, and Gia Mantegna is the daughter of Joe Mantegna. Plans for the series include celebrity cameo appearances. Oller's character was written to be a musician and he will be performing in several episodes. In real life, Oller is a singer, musician and composer. In 2012, Oller and Kelley joined up to form the pop duo MKTO.

== Cast ==
=== Main cast ===
- Grace Gummer portrays Anna Moore, a seventeen-year-old aspiring journalist and actress. She is the eldest daughter of Hollywood actors John and Jennifer Moore. Anna has feelings for Joey, and the two attempted a short-lived relationship upon her return to Los Angeles.
- Tony Oller portrays Walt Moore, Anna's sixteen-year-old brother and musician who doesn't date actresses. Walt hopes for a relationship that doesn't involve anything to do with his status as the son to Hollywood A-listers.
- Ryan Rottman portrays Joey Colvin, an average guy who has feelings for Anna. However, during Anna's time living in Australia, Joey had a fling with Lulu. Nearly a year later, Lulu returns and reveals they have a son.
- Jolene Purdy portrays Piper Katins, Anna's best friend who develops feelings for her family therapist.
- Malcolm David Kelley portrays Finn Katins, Walt's best friend and Piper's adoptive brother.
- Gia Mantegna portrays Vanessa King, Anna's frenemy and an aspiring actress.

=== Recurring cast ===
- Helen Slater portrays Jennifer Moore, Anna and Walt's mother, who is a famous Hollywood actress.
- Patrick Fabian portrays John Moore, Anna and Walt's father, who is also one of Hollywood's A-list actors.
- Skyler Day portrays Maggie Ritter, Walt's girlfriend. Walt soon finds out she is studying to be an actress.
- Laurel Holloman portrays RaeAnne Colvin, Joey's mother.
- Emma Caulfield portrays Sasha, Piper's stepmother.
- Bianca Collins portrays Lulu Khandan, Vanessa's friend and Joey's former fling. She has a son who was "adopted" by her parents in order to hide the truth from the media.
- AJ Lamas portrays Simon Mcrae
- Ben Milliken portrays Russell, Anna's old Australian boyfriend

== Episodes ==
No.	Title	Directed by	Written by	Original release date	Prod. code
1–2	"Pilot"	Angela Robinson	Marti Noxon	October 8, 2010	101–102
Anna and her family move to Hollywood and a secret her friend has causes problems. Anna and Joey have a horrible night together and Walt meets a girl who likes him for who he is.
3	"Black and White and Red All Over"	John Stuart Scott	Bert V. Royal	October 15, 2010	103
Piper looks for a blogger. Anna gets a great opportunity to advance her career.
4	"Cas' Girls Are Not So Easy"	John Stuart Scott	Stacy Rukeyser	October 22, 2010	104
Not wanting to drive Joey away, Anna starts to back off of him. Meanwhile, Vanessa and Jen bond over lunch.
5	"An Awesome Night of Awesomeness"	Rick Rosenthal	Dave Holstein	October 29, 2010	105
Anna and Joey go on their first date. Walt puts on a concert.
6	"Perfect Complications"	Rick Rosenthal	Meg LeFauve & John Michael Morgan	November 5, 2010	106
Anna tries to get info about Vanessa.
7	"All In"	Jamie Babbit	Bert V. Royal	November 12, 2010	107
Joey plays poker to earn money and Piper wants Hugh back.
8	"The Town of No"	Barnet Kellman	Stacy Rukeyser	November 19, 2010	108
Anna has to make a choice about her schooling.
9	"Dottie P."	Sandy Smolan	Dave Holstein	November 26, 2010	109
Maggie starts work on Vanessa's movie, and John takes Joey and Russel on a bonding trip.
10	"Bye, Bye Baby"	Michael Grossman	Nina Colman	December 3, 2010	110
Joey tells Anna the truth, and Vanessa is fired by her agent.
11	"Zen and the Art of Getting Over It"	Jerry Levine	Bert V. Royal	December 10, 2010	111
Anna soothes her aching heart with new hobbies; Piper questions her true feelings for Peter.
12	"Carpe Diem"	Fred Savage	Meg LeFauve & John Michael Morgan	March 11, 2011	112
Finn and Piper search for information about their stepmother; Anna and Russell play a game of Truth or Dare?.
13	"Scramble"	Fred Savage	Dave Holstein	March 18, 2011	113
Anna must choose between Russell and Joey; Anna unexpectedly bonds with Vanessa; Piper tries to keep her father's secret.
14	"Back to Normal"	Joanna Kerns	Meg LeFauve & John Michael Morgan	March 25, 2011	114
The Moores plan a cozy family dinner; Anna and Joey reunite; Piper plans to include her father's secret boyfriend in a family dinner.
15	"The Hell Just Happened"	Bob Berlinger	Dave Holstein	April 1, 2011	115
Anna's mother hopes to reconcile with her daughter; Maggie must choose between Walt and her career.
16	"The Joy of Contrition"	John Stuart Scott	Bert V. Royal	April 8, 2011	116
Walt is excited when he hears from a music producer; Anna and Piper set off a brawl at a party; Vanessa resorts to reality television.
17	"Food Stylist Girl"	Gil Junger	Marti Noxon	April 15, 2011	117
The paparazzi wreaks havoc on Joey, Anna and Piper's lives; Walt teaches Vanessa about songwriting.
18	"Things That Haven't Happened Yet"	Dennie Gordon	Stacy Rukeyser	April 22, 2011	118
Anna grows tired of her parents' wariness about Joey; Piper wants her father to come out at the Moore's premiere.

== Development and production ==
Gigantic had been in development since 2005. The series was created by the brother and sister team of Ben and Debby Wolfinsohn, who wrote, cast and directed a pilot episode that year. In 2007, Reveille Productions joined forces with Viacom to work on the series. In early 2009, Marti Noxon and Dawn Parouse joined the project as showrunners. Viacom green-lit the series with a 13-episode order in May 2009. Production began in October 2009, with the episode order increased to 18. The series was filmed in the Los Angeles area.
