= MKTO =

American pop and hip hop duo

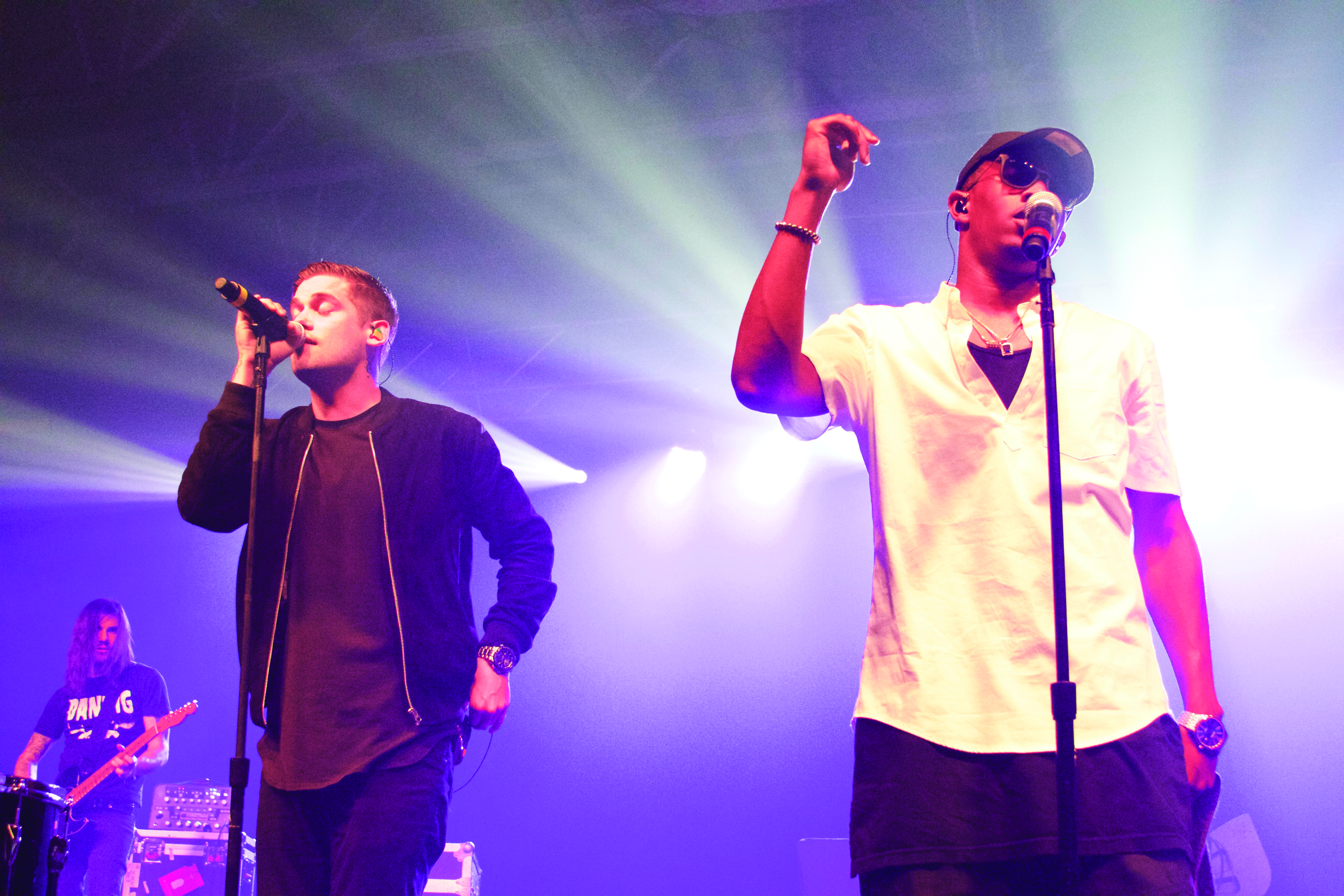
- MKTO performing in 2016

Background information
- Years active: 2010–2017; 2018–2020; 2024–present
- Labels: Columbia; BMG
- Members: Malcolm Kelley; Tony Oller
- Website: wearemkto.com

MKTO is an American pop and hip hop duo, consisting of Malcolm Kelley and Tony Oller from Los Angeles. Their self-titled album was released on January 30, 2014, by Columbia Records. In July 2015, the duo released their first extended play, titled Bad Girls EP. As of 2022, the band has sold over 1 million records worldwide. The name "MKTO" is derived from the first letters of the names and surnames of the members at the time of its founding "MK" for Malcolm Kelley and "TO" for Tony Oller; it also stands for "Misfit Kids and Total Outcasts".

== Career ==
=== 2010–2012: Formation ===
Malcolm Kelley and Tony Oller met in 2010 while filming the Nickelodeon television series Gigantic, in which their characters played best friends. They later formed as a duo and came up with the name MKTO, which represents the combined initials of their names and surnames, MK for Malcolm Kelley and TO for Tony Oller. They elaborated upon the inspiration for their name, saying: "It also stands for what our album kind of is: Misfit Kids and Total Outcasts – just like the kids we were in high school".

=== 2012–2014: MKTO ===
The duo signed to Columbia Records and released their debut single "Thank You" on November 12, 2012. The song's genre is a crossover between pop and hip hop. The song has attained commercial success, reaching the top ten on both the Australian and New Zealand singles charts. The song's music video was released on YouTube via Vevo on January 4, 2013, and garnered over 500,000 views within two days of being released. It now sits at over 25 million views. In the music video, Harold Perrineau, who played the father of Kelley's character on Lost, appeared as a reference to the show. MKTO released their second single, "Classic" along with the music video on June 20, 2013. Classic peaked at number 14 on the US Billboard Hot 100, and the music video has since compiled over 200 million views on YouTube. The music video for their third single, "God Only Knows", was released on November 29, 2013, on YouTube and Vevo. God Only Knows peaked at number 11 in Australia and at number 19 in New Zealand. In 2013, they served as the opening for Emblem3 on their summer tour across the United States. They also served as the opening for Emblem3's #bandlife Tour and Demi Lovato's "Demi: World Tour" in 2014. Their self-titled debut album was released on January 30, 2014 in Australia and New Zealand and it was released on April 1 in North America.

In February 2014, their debut album went to #1 in Australia and #6 in New Zealand. During the summer of 2014, MKTO went on their first headlining tour, the American Dream Tour. This featured opening acts Tiffany Houghton and Action Item. The fourth single from their debut album in the United States is "American Dream" and peaked at number 40 in Australia and at number 12 in New Zealand. Despite not being singles, "Forever Until Tomorrow" reached number 23 on iTunes in Australia and "Heartbreak Holiday" reached number 30 on iTunes in Australia and number 42 in the United States.

=== 2015–2016: Bad Girls EP ===
On July 22, 2015, MKTO released their first extended play Bad Girls EP, which was preceded by the June 2015 release of its lead single "Bad Girls". The single peaked at number 80 in Australia and peaked at number 36 on the Billboard Mainstream Top 40. The EP peaked at number 32 on the iTunes chart in Australia and number 50 on the iTunes chart in the United States. A double A-side single including two brand-new tracks "Hands Off My Heart/Places You Go" was premiered exclusively on Billboard on March 9, 2016. "Superstitious" is the second single that was released in 2016 by the duo.

=== 2017–present: Canceled second studio album, disbandment, return ===
On March 10, 2017, Oller announced on Twitter that the band had broken up. However, according to their Twitter page, they plan to release new music very soon. On June 12, 2018, MKTO announced on Twitter that they were back together. Three days later, on June 15, the band announced they had signed a new record deal with BMG. Following the announcement, the duo released a new single titled, "How Can I Forget" in August 2018. In June 2019, they released another single, "Shoulda Known Better". A third single, "Marry Those Eyes" was released on September 6, 2019. "Consider Me Yours" was released on November 22, 2019. In April 2020, MKTO released a music video for Just Imagine It. They also released 3 singles, "Simple Things", "Party With My Friends" and "How Much". "Party With My Friends" peaked at number 85 on iTunes while "How Much" peaked at number 54 on iTunes. On August 17, 2021, Tony Oller announced via social media that he would be moving on from the band. However, months after this announcement, it appears he has returned as he frequently uploads on the MKTO YouTube channel and performed a live show for Hold on til Dawn in May 2022. In December 2024, Hold on til Dawn announced that they were reuniting MKTO for another benefit concert in Orlando. On January 26, 2025, Tony Oller and Malcolm Kelley took the stage for the first time since they disbanded in 2020.

Currently, MKTO plan to begin a new tour, with its first concert being announced for February 14, 2025, at Florida Southern College, as part of their annual Southern Takeover event.

== Discography ==
=== Albums ===
Title	Album details	Peak chart positions				Certifications
Title	Album details	US	AUS	NZ	SWE	Certifications
MKTO	Released: January 30, 2014; Formats: CD, digital download; Label: Columbia	31	1	6	21	RMNZ: 2× Platinum

=== EPs ===
Title	EP details
Bad Girls EP	Released: July 24, 2015; Formats: Digital download; Label: Columbia

=== Singles ===
==== As lead artist ====
List of singles as lead artist, with selected chart positions and certifications shown
Title	Year	Peak chart positions										Sales	Certifications	Album
Title	Year	US	US Pop	AUS	BEL (Fl) Tip	CAN	NL	NZ	RUS Air	SWE	UK	Sales	Certifications	Album
"Thank You"	2012	— (Note: "Thank You" did not enter the Billboard Hot 100, but peaked at number 20 on the Bubbling Under Hot 100.)	38	2	30	—	27	7	—	—	—		ARIA: 4× Platinum; RMNZ: 2× Platinum	MKTO
"Classic"	2013	14	8	9	9	61	45	8	217	7	24	US: 742,000	RIAA: 2× Platinum; ARIA: 3× Platinum; BPI: 2× Platinum; IFPI SWE: Platinum; RMNZ: 7× Platinum	MKTO
"God Only Knows"	2013	—	—	11	—	—	—	19	—	—	—		ARIA: Platinum; RMNZ: Platinum	MKTO
"American Dream"	2014	—	33	40	—	—	—	12	—	—	—		ARIA: Gold; RMNZ: Platinum	MKTO
"Bad Girls"	2015	—	36	80	—	—	—	—	211	—	—			Bad Girls EP
"Hands Off My Heart/Places You Go"	2016	—	—	—	—	—	—	—	—	—	—			Non-album singles
"Superstitious"	2016	—	—	—	—	—	—	—	—	—	—			Non-album singles
"How Can I Forget"	2018	—	—	— (Note: "How Can I Forget" did not enter the ARIA Singles Chart, but peaked at number 38 on the ARIA Digital Track Chart.)	—	—	—	—	—	—	—		RMNZ: Gold	Non-album singles
"Shoulda Known Better"	2019	—	—	—	—	—	—	—	—	—	—			Non-album singles
"Marry Those Eyes"	2019	—	—	—	—	—	—	—	—	—	—			Non-album singles
"Consider Me Yours"	2019	—	—	—	—	—	—	—	—	—	—			Non-album singles
"Simple Things"	2020	—	—	—	—	—	—	—	—	—	—			Non-album singles
"Party with My Friends"	2020	—	—	—	—	—	—	—	—	—	—			Non-album singles
"How Much"	2020	—	—	—	—	—	—	—	—	—	—			Non-album singles
"—" denotes a single that did not chart or was not released.

=== Promotional singles ===
Title	Year	Album
"Forever Until Tomorrow"	2014	MKTO
"Just Imagine It"	2015	Bad Girls EP

==== As featured artist ====
List of singles as featured artist, showing year released and album name
Title	Year	Album
"Summer Paradise" (Simple Plan featuring MKTO)	2013	Non-album single

== Awards and nominations ==
=== Teen Choice Awards ===
Year	Award	Category	Nominated	Result
2014	Teen Choice Awards	Choice Music: Breakout Group	MKTO	Nominated

=== Radio Disney Music Awards ===
Year	Award	Category	Recipient	Result
2014	Radio Disney Music Awards	Catchiest New Song	"Classic"	Nominated
2015	Radio Disney Music Awards	Catchiest New Song	"Classic"	Nominated
