= Now That's What I Call Music! 49 (American series) =

Compilation album by Various artists
- Released: February 4, 2014
- Length: 78:58
- Label: Universal Music Enterprises

Numbered series chronology
Now That's What I Call Music! 48 (2013)	Now That's What I Call Music! 49 (2014)	Now That's What I Call Music! 50 (2014)

Now That's What I Call Music! 49, released on February 4, 2014, is the 49th edition of the Now! series in the United States. The album features three Billboard Hot 100 number-one hits: "Timber", "Royals", and "Wrecking Ball".

Now! 49 debuted at number one on the Billboard 200 albums chart with sales of 98,000 copies in its first week of release. As of June 2014, 482,000 copies of the compilation had been sold.

== Track listing ==
No.	Title	Artist	Length
1.	"Timber"	Pitbull featuring Kesha	3:22
2.	"Royals"	Lorde	3:08
3.	"Wrecking Ball"	Miley Cyrus	3:41
4.	"Unconditionally"	Katy Perry	3:47
5.	"Story of My Life"	One Direction	4:04
6.	"Say Something"	A Great Big World and Christina Aguilera	3:47
7.	"Demons"	Imagine Dragons	2:54
8.	"Counting Stars"	OneRepublic	4:15
9.	"Hold On, We're Going Home"	Drake featuring Majid Jordan	3:45
10.	"Do What U Want"	Lady Gaga featuring R. Kelly	3:45
11.	"Work Work"	Britney Spears	4:06
12.	"Burn"	Ellie Goulding	3:49
13.	"Stay the Night"	Zedd featuring Hayley Williams	3:34
14.	"TKO"	Justin Timberlake	4:46
15.	"Gorilla"	Bruno Mars	3:58
16.	"Drink a Beer"	Luke Bryan	3:25
17.	"Last Love Song"	ZZ Ward	3:29
18.	"Trouble"	Natalia Kills	4:18
19.	"Show Me What You Got"	G.R.L.	3:34
20.	"Doesn't Get Better"	Alex Aiono	3:02
21.	"Alienation"	Morning Parade	4:22

== Charts ==
=== Weekly charts ===
Chart (2014)	Peak position
US Billboard 200	1

=== Year-end charts ===
Chart (2014)	Position
US Billboard 200	31
