= New Politics (band) =

Danish rock band

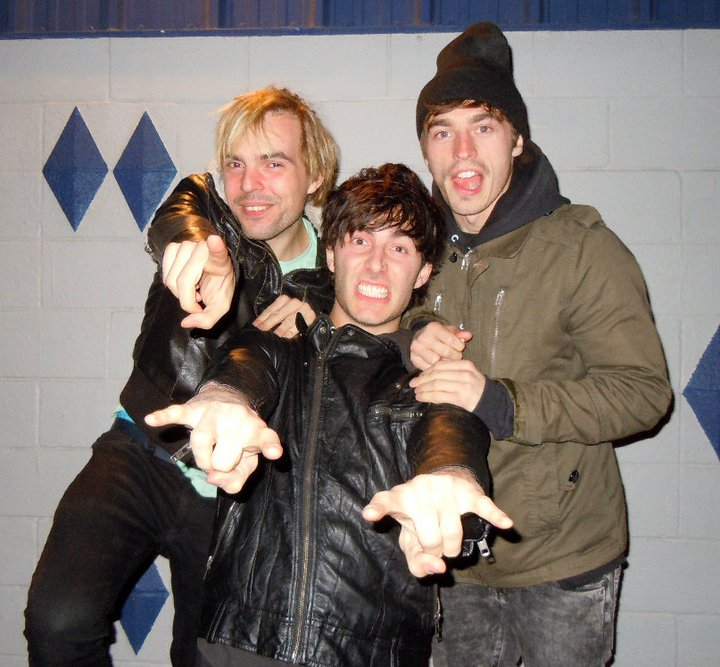
- New Politics at the Diamond Ballroom in Oklahoma City in 2010. From left to right: Søren Hansen, Louis Vecchio, David Boyd.

Background information
- Origin: Copenhagen, Denmark
- Genres: Alternative rock; pop rock; dance-rock; pop punk; rap rock (early)
- Years active: 2009–2020 (on hiatus)
- Labels: Warner Bros., DCD2, RCA, Big Noise Music Group
- Members: David Boyd; Søren Hansen; Louis Vecchio
- Past members: Poul Amaliel

New Politics is a Danish rock band from Copenhagen, formed in 2009. It consists of David Boyd, Søren Hansen, and Louis Vecchio. The band's sound has been described as a blend of "punk, pop, and electronically induced dance rock". They have released five albums: New Politics in 2010, A Bad Girl in Harlem in 2013, Vikings in 2015, Lost in Translation in 2017 and An Invitation to an Alternate Reality in 2019. They are best known for their singles "Yeah Yeah Yeah" and "Harlem".

== History ==
After writing songs together for three years for their respective solo albums (which were never produced), Boyd and Hansen realized they had a group forming. In 2009, the duo entered with two of their songs, "Stress" and "Money", in the Danish National Radio P3's Karriere Kanonen ("Career Cannon") competition. Of 973 bands, New Politics was among 42 selected to perform, despite not yet being an official band, and not having selected the final line-up. Boyd and Hansen hired Poul Amaliel to play drums. The new trio were among the top four winners and went on to play in a major music festival in Denmark.

In November 2009, New Politics signed with RCA. After a brief UK tour, the trio went on a nationwide US tour. Because of the group's new record deal with RCA, they moved to the United States. They currently reside in a loft apartment in Williamsburg, Brooklyn, New York.

The band performed at the South by Southwest festival in March 2010. On 13 July 2010, they released their first album, the self-titled New Politics. It featured ten tracks, including the hit single "Yeah Yeah Yeah". An official video was filmed in New York City for this single. The album received a mixed review from Allmusic, noting the band's influences were too obvious. They embarked on a 30-date tour of the US to promote the album, and supported Thirty Seconds to Mars on the Into the Wild Tour in September and October 2010. They made a second video for their single "Dignity", and released it on Myspace.com on 8 October 2010. Like "Yeah Yeah Yeah," this video was filmed in New York City. In autumn of 2010, Amaliel left the band to return to Denmark.

On 26 November 2012, their song "Harlem" was promoted as the first single from their second album, A Bad Girl in Harlem, released on 21 May 2013. In late 2013, New Politics' "Harlem" broke into U.S. alternative radio, and briefly impacted contemporary hit radio in the United States later on. Harlem peaked at number four on the U.S. Billboard Alternative Airplay chart, their highest ranking song on any Billboard chart.

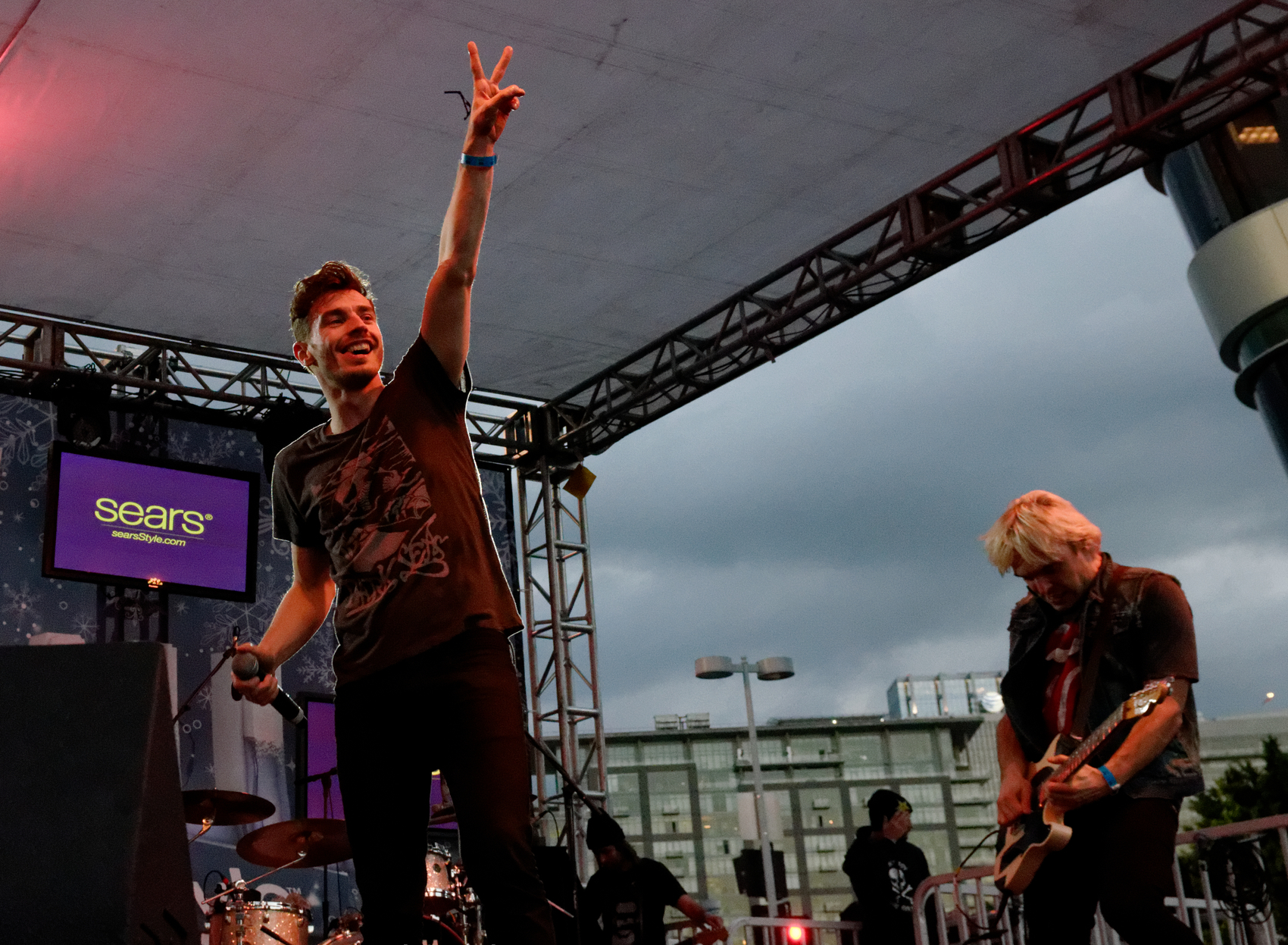
New Politics performing in 2013

From 18 January–15 May 2013, the trio toured along with Twenty One Pilots during the winter and spring portions of their Trips for Concerts 2013 tour. They also opened for pop-punk band Fall Out Boy during their Save Rock and Roll Spring Tour from 28 May–26 June 2013. On 21 July 2013, New Politics performed "Harlem" at Guy Code Honors at Comic-Con. The band opened for Pink during her The Truth About Love Tour at select dates until 6 November 2013.

In early 2014, New Politics kicked off their U.S. tour with openers Magic Man and Sleeper Agent. The tour spanned the first few months of 2014 and was their first headlining tour. They opened for Fall Out Boy along with The Pretty Reckless for the European leg of the Save Rock and Roll tour in 2014. They were the opening act for the 2014 tour by Paramore and Fall Out Boy, Monumentour. On 22 September 2014, the band released a single titled "Everywhere I Go (Kings & Queens)", the first from their then-forthcoming album Vikings, under their new labels, DCD2 Records (formerly Decaydance) and Warner Bros. Records. The band kicked off their headlining Everywhere I Go Tour with Bad Suns and SomeKindaWonderful on 14 Oct. in Washington, D.C. touring the US and Canada.

In April 2015, the band recorded their hit "Everywhere I Go" in Simlish, a made-up language, for the game The Sims 4, hoping to reach a different demographic. In May 2015, the band released "West End Kids" as the second single from Vikings and announced that the album would be released on 14 August 2015. In October the band joined Andrew McMahon with special guests The Griswolds, as well as fellow DCD2 artist LOLO, on The Wilderness Politics Tour. It began in Seattle and ended in Philadelphia in November 2015. In early 2017, the band released the single "One Of Us", and was scheduled to tour the United States with 311 during the summer.

On 2 August 2017, New Politics announced that their fourth studio album Lost in Translation would be released on 6 October 2017, and released the single "CIA" the day after. They posted on Facebook that the album would focus on life after touring and growing more successful, as well as describe the task of reinventing themselves. In support of the album, New Politics toured twice during the spring and fall of 2018 across North America.

In April 2019, New Politics had their tenth anniversary as a band. As teased on social media, the song "Comeback Kid" was released on 16 April 2019.

The band announced on 18 October 2019 that their fifth studio album, An Invitation to an Alternate Reality, would be released on 1 November 2019.

== Band members ==
Current members

- David Boyd – lead vocals, guitar, keyboards, programming (2009–present)
- Søren Hansen – bass guitar, guitar, vocals, keyboards, programming (2009–present)
- Louis Vecchio – drums, percussion, programming, backing vocals (2010–present)

Former members

- Poul Amaliel – drums, percussion, bass guitar, backing vocals (2009–2010)

== Discography ==
=== Studio albums ===
Year	Album	Label	Chart peaks		
Year	Album	Label	US	US Heat	US Rock
2010	New Politics: Release date: 13 July 2010	RCA Records	—	9	—
2013	A Bad Girl in Harlem: Release date: 21 May 2013	RCA Records	129	1	34
2015	Vikings: Release date: 14 August 2015	DCD2 Records/Warner Bros. Records	129	—	—
2017	Lost In Translation: Release date: 6 October 2017	DCD2 Records/Warner Bros. Records	—	—	—
2019	An Invitation to an Alternate Reality: Release date: 1 November 2019	Big Noise Music Group	—	—	—

=== Extended plays ===
- Escape to Paradise (2020)

=== Singles ===
List of singles, with selected chart positions
Title	Year	Peak chart positions					Album
Title	Year	US Bub.	US Alt.	US Rock	US Adult	US Pop	Album
"Yeah Yeah Yeah"	2010	—	16	45	—	—	New Politics
"Dignity"	2010	—	29	—	—	—	New Politics
"Harlem"	2013	10	4	21	39	34	A Bad Girl in Harlem
"Tonight You're Perfect"	2013	—	16	23	19	—	A Bad Girl in Harlem
"Everywhere I Go (Kings & Queens)"	2014	—	19	28	—	—	Vikings
"West End Kids"	2015	—	25	—	—	—	Vikings
"Girl Crush"	2015	—	31	—	—	—	Vikings
"One of Us"	2017	—	10	40	—	—	Lost in Translation
"CIA"	2017	—	30	—	—	—	Lost in Translation
"Comeback Kid"	2019	—	39	—	—	—	Non-album single
"Ozone"	2019	—	—	—	—	—	An Invitation to an Alternate Reality
"Unstoppable"	2020	—	40	—	—	—	An Invitation to an Alternate Reality
"Therapy"	2020	—	30	—	—	—	An Invitation to an Alternate Reality
"Holy Grail"	2020	—	—	—	—	—	Escape to Paradise
"Money Makes the World Go Round" (with Jaxson Gamble)	2023	—	—	—	—	—	Non-album single
"—" denotes a recording that did not chart or was not released in that territory.
