= Malcolm David Kelley =

American actor rapper and singer

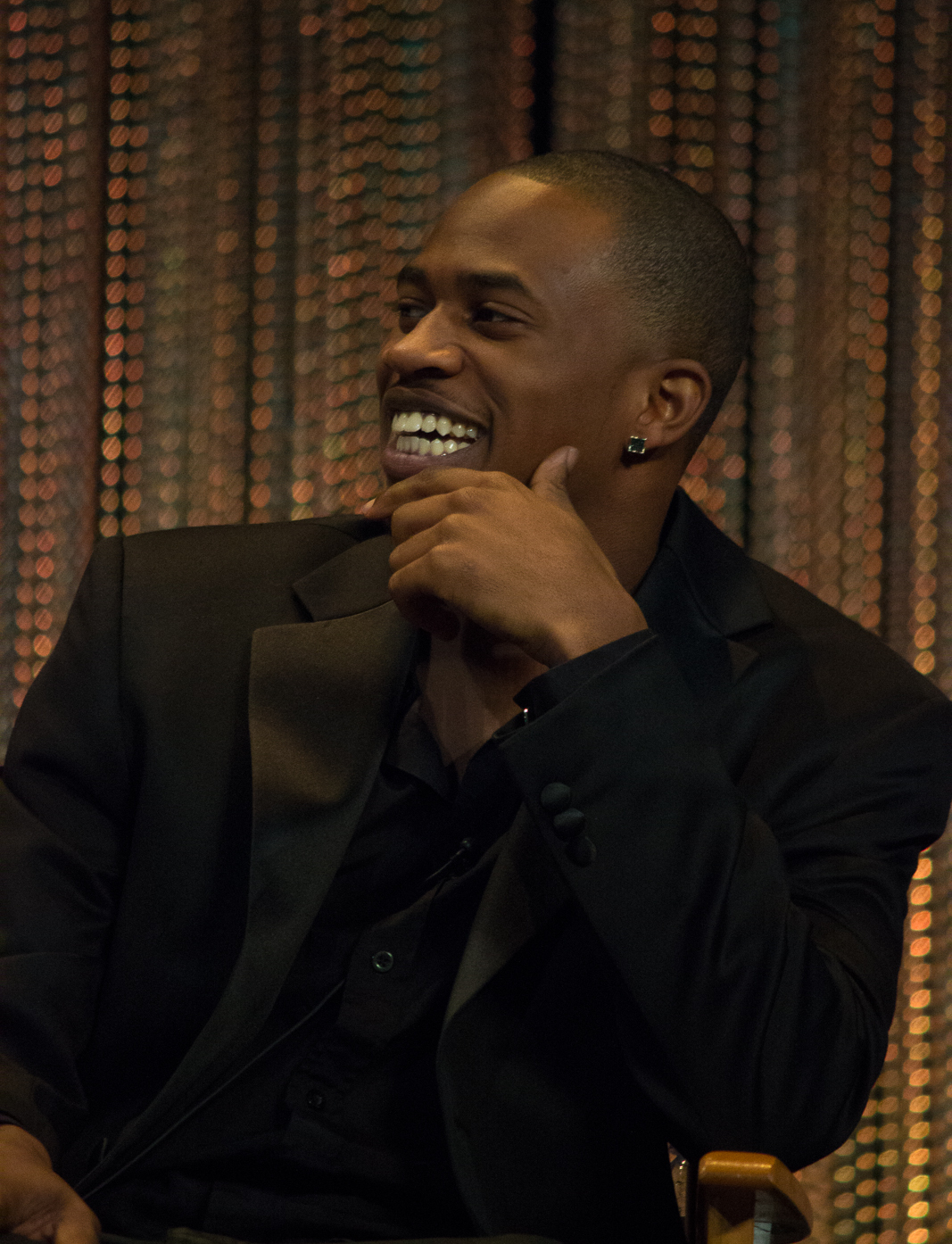
- Kelley at PaleyFest 2014 for Lost

Background information
- Also known as: Malcolm Kelley
- Born: May 12, 1992 (age 34); Bellflower, California, U.S.
- Genres: Hip hop; pop
- Occupations: Actor; rapper; singer
- Years active: 1999–present
- Member of: MKTO

Malcolm David Kelley (born May 12, 1992), sometimes credited as just Malcolm Kelley, is an American actor, rapper, and singer best known for portraying the character Walt Lloyd on the ABC series Lost and as one half of the pop duo MKTO.

== Career ==
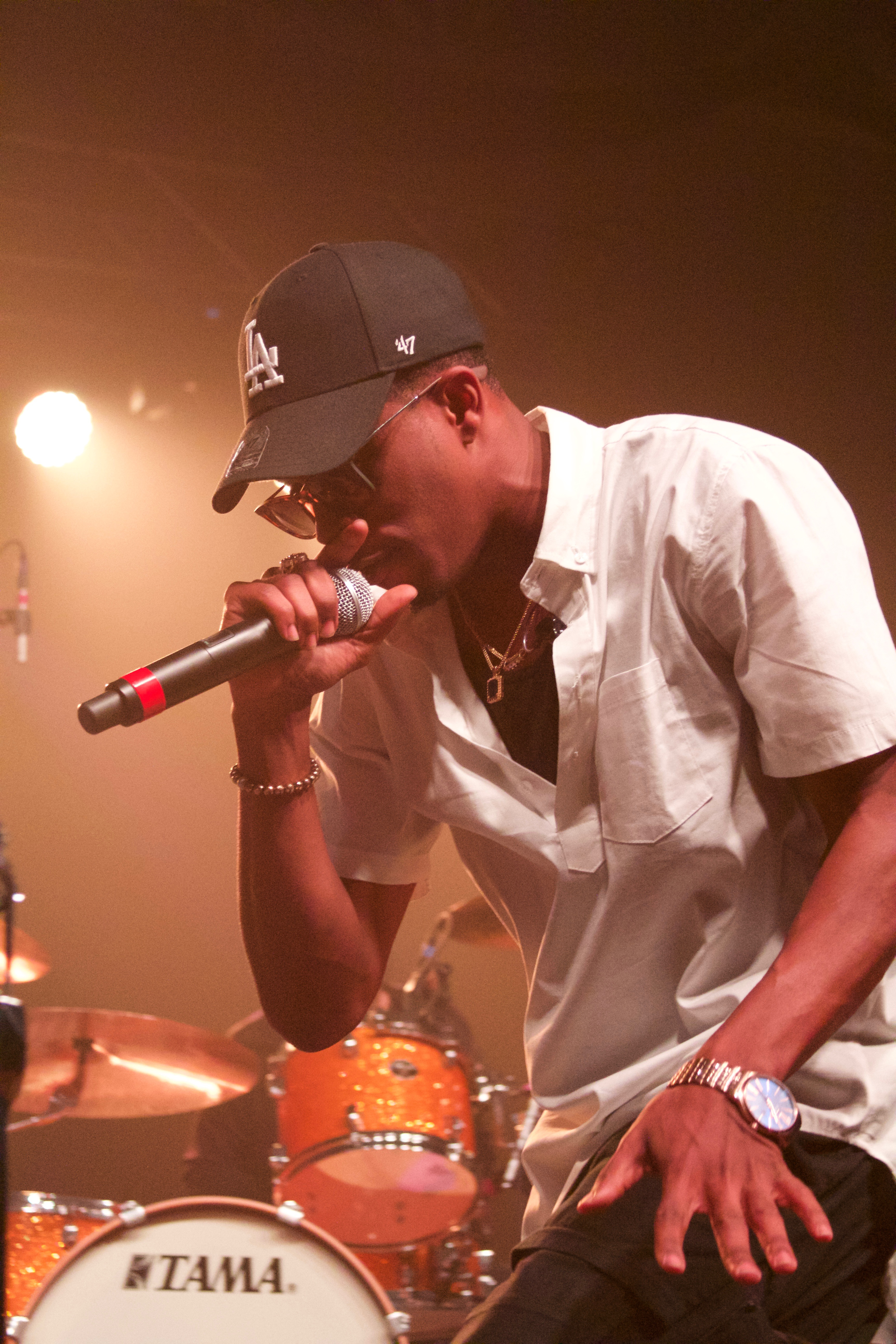
Kelley performing with MKTO in 2016.

=== Acting ===
Kelley's first major acting role was in the 2002 film Antwone Fisher, in which he played the title character as a child. Prior to this, he appeared in several small television roles in programs such as Malcolm in the Middle and Judging Amy. His next film role was You Got Served, in which he was cast in the supporting role of Lil' Saint.

In 2004, he was cast to play Walt in the TV show Lost. A regular cast member in the show's first season (2004–2005), he appeared only occasionally thereafter due to a dramatic growth spurt. He returned for an appearance in "Through the Looking Glass", Lost's third season finale, and twice more in the fourth season, with the episodes "Meet Kevin Johnson" and "There's No Place Like Home", and reprised his role in the fifth season with the episode "The Life and Death of Jeremy Bentham". He reprised the role of Walt a final time in the Season 6 DVD box set mini-episode "The New Man in Charge".

Following his departure from the main cast of Lost, Kelley appeared in several television roles, including the recurring character of Benjamin Cooley on Saving Grace.

In 2010, he appeared in the lead role of Finn on the TeenNick program Gigantic. The show was canceled after one season in 2011.

In 2014, he appeared in a guest role as himself and Tony Oller on The Thundermans as MKTO.

In 2017, he played Black in the film True to the Game and Michael Clark in Detroit.

=== Music ===
In 2012, Kelley and his former Gigantic co-star Tony Oller formed the pop duo MKTO. They were signed to Columbia Records. In 2013 Kelley recorded together with Celine Dion, the song "Save Your Soul" for Dion's late 2013 release Loved Me Back to Life. But their duet version was only included on the album's vinyl version. On the regular version, "Save Your Soul" only contains Dion's vocals.

The duo's debut self-titled album, was released on April 1, 2014. Their single "Classic" was a major hit in the summer of 2014, reaching number 14 on the Billboard Hot 100.

== Filmography ==
=== Film ===
Year	Title	Role	Notes
2002	Antwone Fisher	Antwone Fisher Age 7	
2004	You Got Served	Lil Saint	
2009	The Kings of Appletown	Cliff	
2009	Surviving Brotherhood		Short video
2009	Mississippi Damned	Young Sammy	
2017	Detroit	Michael Clark	
2017	True to the Game	Black	
2021	Dutch	Teen Dutch	

=== Television ===
Year	Title	Role	Notes
1998	For Your Love	Reggie at 5	Episode: "The Brother's Day"
2001	Malcolm in the Middle	Kid #1	Episode: "Malcolm's Girlfriend"
2002	Girlfriends	Malcolm	Episode: "I Have a Dream House"
2002	Judging Amy	Rudy Spruell	Episode: "Nobody Expects the Spanish Inquisition"
2004	Eve	Martin	Episode: "They've Come Undone: Part 2"
2004–2009	Lost	Walt Lloyd	Main Cast (Season 1–2); Special Guest Star (Season 3–5): 33 episodes
2005	Knights of the South Bronx	Jimmy Washington	TV movie
2006	Law & Order: Special Victims Unit	Nathan Phelps	Episode: "Infected"
2006	My Name Is Earl	Alby	Episode: "Boogeyman"
2007–2010	Saving Grace	Benjamin Cooley	4 episodes
2010–2011	Gigantic	Finn Katins	18 episodes
2011	The Closer	Curtis Hill	Episode: "Necessary Evil"
2011	Shredd	Young Nate	TV movie
2014	The Thundermans	Himself	Episode: "Shred it Go"
2015	Bones	Preston	Episode: "The Resurrection in the Remains"
2017	Blindspot	Keith Rhodes	Episode: "Adoring Suspect"
2017–2021	Insecure	Jerome Carter	7 episodes
2020	Deputy	Matthew Evans	1 episode
