= Tony Oller =

American actor and singer (born 1991)

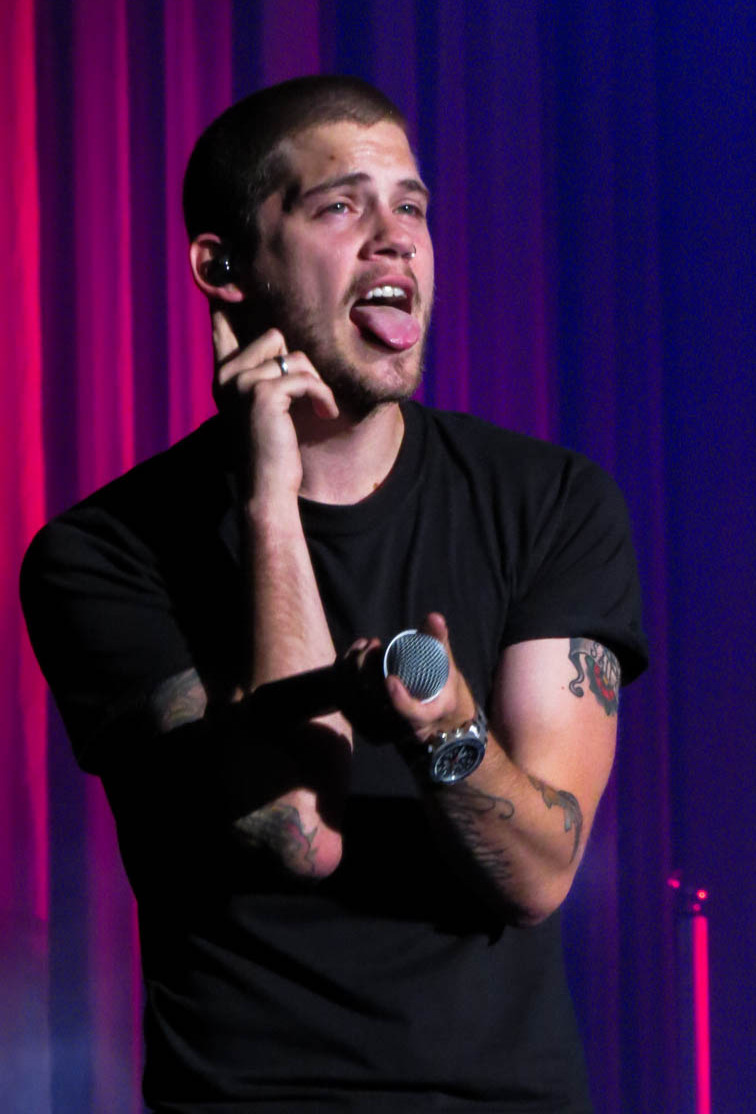
- Oller performing in 2014

Background information
- Born: Anthony Michael Oller; February 25, 1991 (age 35); Springfield, Illinois, U.S.
- Occupations: Actor; singer
- Years active: 2004–present
- Member of: MKTO

Anthony Michael Oller (born February 25, 1991) is an American actor and singer. He had roles as Walt Moore on the TeenNick TV show Gigantic, and as Danny on Disney Channel's As the Bell Rings. He appeared in the films Beneath the Darkness and The Purge. He was also half of the group MKTO with his co-star Malcolm David Kelley, before leaving the group in 2021.

== Early life ==
Oller was raised in Houston, Texas, the son of Mary Anne (née Brown) and Jeff Oller. He began acting in elementary school, having been cast as a lead role in a school Christmas play. He graduated with honors in Debate from Cy-Fair High School in 2009.

== Career ==
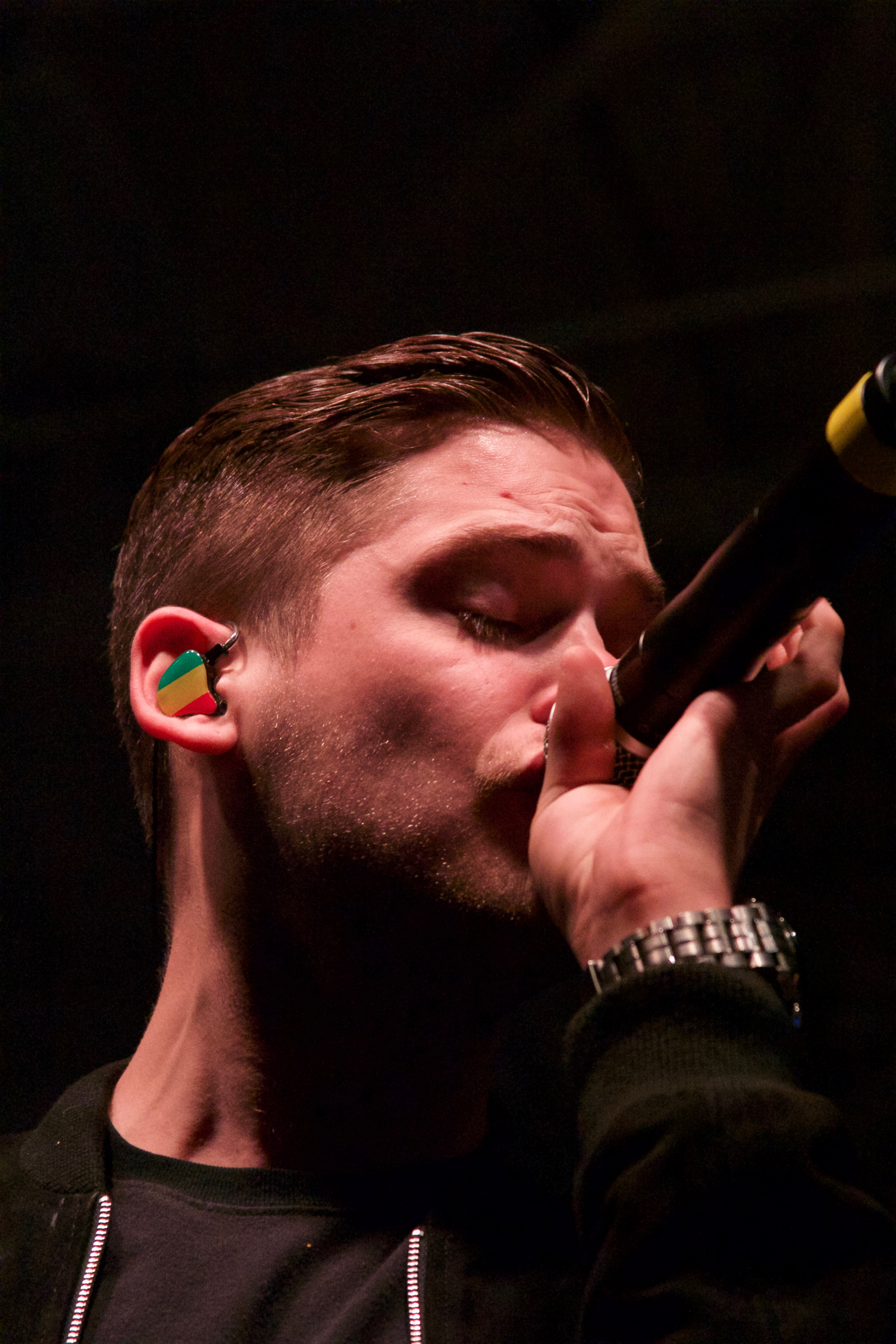
Oller performing with MKTO in 2016

=== Acting career ===
Oller appeared in both seasons of the Disney Channel short comedy series As the Bell Rings as Danny. The show consisted of short episodes that showed during commercial breaks and took place in a single high school hallway where the character hang out between classes, and the show was originally based on Italy's short form TV series "Quelli dell'Intervallo". As The Bell Rings features three original songs recorded by Oller. His first song/music video "Could You Be The One" premiered August 2, 2008, on the Disney Channel followed by "Here I Go" and "All You Gotta Do". He also appeared on Savannah Outen's music video for her single, "If You Only Knew".

In 2010, Oller had a supporting role in the Lifetime drama movie Unanswered Prayers, which was based on a song by Garth Brooks. He also appeared in the TeenNick series Gigantic as Walt Moore. This is where he met Malcolm David Kelley, who later became one half of the pop-duo MKTO. In 2011, Oller starred in the NBC's TV movie Field of Vision. The movie was about a high-school football player (Tony Oller) who must make a difficult decision regarding bullies.

Later in 2011, Oller guest starred in an episode of CSI: NY. He had a lead role in the 2012 horror thriller film Beneath the Darkness.. In 2013 he starred as Henry in the horror thriller film The Purge. 2014, he appeared with his band mate Malcolm David Kelley on the series The Thundermans as himself.

In 2016, Oller appeared as Ian in romantic series Relationship Status co-starring Mekenna Melvin, which premiered on Go90 app.

=== MKTO ===
In 2012, Oller and his former Gigantic co-star Malcolm David Kelley joined up to form the pop duo MKTO. The group signed to Columbia Records and released their debut single "Thank You" on January 15, 2013. The single reached number 2 on the Australian charts. and number 7 on the New Zealand charts. In 2013 their single "Classic" was released with a music video and saw the song peak at number 14 on the Billboard Hot 100. Their debut album was released on April 1, 2014 and saw the album peak at number 31 on the Billboard 200.

On June 2, 2015, MKTO released the lyric video of their new single, "Bad Girls". On June 5, 2015, the video for "Bad Girls" was released. It also appeared as #21 on the iTunes pop charts. A double A-side single including two brand new tracks "Hands Off My Heart/Places You Go" was premiered exclusively on Billboard on March 9, 2016. On March 10, 2017, Tony Oller announced on Twitter that the band had broken up. However, in September 2017, the band had announced that they were working on their second studio album.

In August 2021, Oller announced that he had parted ways with the band.

== Filmography ==
=== Film ===
Year	Title	Role	Notes
2006	I Flunked Sunday School	Lloyd at 13	
2011	Beneath the Darkness	Travis	
2013	The Purge	Henry	
2018	The First Purge	Henry (flashbacks)	

=== Television ===
Year	Title	Role	Notes
2007–2009	As the Bell Rings	Daniel "Danny" Neilson / Romeo	Main role, 30 episodes, Episode: "Romeo & Juliet" (as Romeo)
2010–2011	Gigantic	Walt Moore	Main role, 18 episodes
2010	Unanswered Prayers	Jesse Beck	Television film
2011	Field of Vision	Tyler McFarland	Television film
2011	CSI: NY	Nicholas Albertson	Episode: "Crossroads"
2014	The Thundermans	Himself	Episode: "Shred It Go"

=== Web ===
Year	Title	Role	Notes
2016	Relationship Status	Ian	3 episodes

== Discography ==
=== Singles ===
Year	Title	Album	Notes
2007	"Shadow"	As the Bell Rings	with Demi Lovato
2008	"Could You Be the One"	As the Bell Rings	
2008	"Here I Go"	As the Bell Rings	
2008	"All You Gotta Do"	As the Bell Rings	
2009	"All I Need"	Non-album singles	Zoovolution.com
2009	"Live Without You"	Non-album singles	with Naomi Jo Biggin
