= David Boyd (singer) =

Danish singer

- Born: David Sebastian Boyd; 6 February 1988 (age 38); Copenhagen, Denmark
- Genres: Alternative rock
- Occupations: Singer, musician, breakdancer
- Instruments: Vocals, guitar, keyboards
- Years active: 2002–present
- Labels: DCD2, Warner Bros.
- Partner(s): Christian Serratos (2014–present; engaged)
- Website: newpoliticsrock.com

David Sebastian Boyd (born 6 February 1988) is a Danish musician who is best known as the lead vocalist, guitarist, keyboardist and programmer of the alternative rock band New Politics.

== Early life ==
His mother is Swedish/Danish and his father is Irish American; he was born and raised in Copenhagen.

== Career ==
Boyd is an accomplished breakdancer. He appeared in modern dance productions choreographed by Steen Koerner and in a post-apocalyptic dance version of Rudyard Kipling's The Jungle Book.

With New Politics Boyd is known for his exotic dancing on stage and even "creating" a dance move called "Boyding", which involves standing on one's head otherwise known as the headstand.

== Personal life ==
He moved to Brooklyn, New York, with his bandmates in 2009 and spent a ton of time with Louis and friend Jesse Leo at Heartland Brewery where the song Harlem was first played.

In March 2017, Boyd and his girlfriend, American actress Christian Serratos, announced that they were expecting their first child together.
