= List of The 100 characters =

Main cast of the second season (L-R): McDonell, Taylor, Morley, Bostick, Avgeropoulos, Morgan, Whittle, Larkin, Turco, Washington, and Cusick.

The 100 (pronounced The Hundred) is an American post-apocalyptic, science fiction drama developed for The CW by Jason Rothenberg, and is loosely based on the novel series of the same name by Kass Morgan. The series follows a group of survivors who return to Earth, ninety-seven years after a nuclear apocalypse left the planet inhospitable. Soon, they come across the various settlements of other survivors of the disaster, including the Grounders, the Reapers, and the Mountain Men.

The series stars Eliza Taylor as Clarke Griffin, as well as Paige Turco, Thomas McDonell, Eli Goree, Marie Avgeropoulos, Bob Morley, Kelly Hu (who was dropped after the first episode due to budget cuts), Christopher Larkin, Devon Bostick, Isaiah Washington, and Henry Ian Cusick. Lindsey Morgan and Ricky Whittle, who recurred in the first season, joined the main cast for the second season. Richard Harmon was promoted to the main cast in the third season, after recurring in the first and second seasons. Zach McGowan, who recurred in the third, was promoted to the main cast for the fourth season. Tasya Teles was promoted to the main cast in the series' fifth season, after appearing as a guest in the second and third seasons, and recurring in the fourth. Shannon Kook joined the main cast in the sixth season, after a guest appearance in the fifth. JR Bourne and Chuku Modu, who recurred in the sixth season, were promoted to the main cast in the seventh season, whilst Shelby Flannery had a guest appearance in the sixth season before joining the main cast in the seventh.

The following is a list of characters that have appeared on the television series. While some are named for, or based upon, characters from Morgan's The 100 novel series, others are created solely for the television series.

== Overview ==
Actor	Character	Seasons						
Actor	Character	1	2	3	4	5	6	7
Main cast
Eliza Taylor	Clarke Griffin	Main	Main	Main	Main	Main	Main	Main
Paige Turco	Abigail "Abby" Griffin	Main	Main	Main	Main	Main	Main	Guest
Thomas McDonell	Finn Collins	Main	Main					
Eli Goree	Wells Jaha	Main (Note: Goree was credited as main cast for the first three episodes of season one.)	Guest					
Marie Avgeropoulos	Octavia Blake	Main	Main	Main	Main	Main	Main	Main
Bob Morley	Bellamy Blake	Main (Note: Morley was credited as main cast for the first 13 episodes of the seventh season; however, he appeared in only six of them.)	Main	Main	Main	Main	Main	Main
Kelly Hu	Callie "Cece" Cartwig	Main (Note: Hu was only credited as main cast in the pilot episode.)						
Christopher Larkin	Monty Green	Main	Main	Main	Main	Main	Guest	
Devon Bostick	Jasper Jordan	Main (Note: Bostick was credited as main cast for the first 11 episodes of season 4; however, he only appeared in 7 of them.)	Main	Main	Main			
Isaiah Washington	Thelonious Jaha	Main (Note: Washington was credited as main cast for the first 2 episodes of season 5; however, he only appeared in episode 2 of that season.)	Main	Main	Main	Main		
Henry Ian Cusick	Marcus Kane I	Main (Note: Cusick was credited as main cast in the first 9 episodes of season 6; however, he only appeared in 3 of them.)	Main	Main	Main	Main	Main	
Lindsey Morgan	Raven Reyes	Recurring	Main	Main	Main	Main	Main	Main
Ricky Whittle	Lincoln	Recurring	Main (Note: Whittle was credited as main cast in the first 9 episodes and episode 12 in season 3.)	Main				
Richard Harmon	John Murphy	Recurring	Recurring	Main	Main	Main	Main	Main
Zach McGowan	Roan			Recurring	Main (Note: McGowan was credited as main cast in the first 10 episodes of season four.)			Guest
Tasya Teles	Echo/Ash		Guest	Guest	Recurring	Main	Main	Main
Shannon Kook	Jordan Green					Guest	Main	Main
JR Bourne	Russell Lightbourne / Sheidheda						Recurring	Main (Note: Bourne only portrays Russell Lightbourne in first episode of Season 7, after which he portrays Sheidheda for the remaining episodes.)
Chuku Modu	Gabriel Santiago						Recurring	Main
Shelby Flannery	Hope Diyoza						Guest	Main
Recurring cast
Sachin Sahel	Eric Jackson	Recurring	Recurring	Recurring	Recurring	Recurring	Recurring	Recurring
Jarod Joseph	Nathan Miller	Recurring	Recurring	Recurring	Recurring	Recurring	Recurring	Recurring
Chelsey Reist	Harper McIntyre	Recurring	Recurring	Recurring	Recurring	Recurring		
Jojo Ahenkorah	Costa	Recurring	Recurring	Recurring	Recurring			
Alessandro Juliani	Jacapo Sinclair	Recurring	Recurring	Recurring	Guest			
Katie Stuart	Zoe Monroe	Recurring	Recurring	Recurring				
Genevieve Buechner	Fox	Recurring	Recurring	Guest				
Dichen Lachman	Anya	Recurring	Recurring					
Keenan Tracey	Sterling	Recurring	Recurring					
Aaron Miko	John Mbege	Recurring		Guest				
Shane Symons	Jones	Recurring		Guest				
Chris Browning	Jake Griffin	Recurring					Guest	
Josh Ssettuba	Connor	Recurring						
Christine Willes	Vera Kane	Recurring						
Kate Vernon	Diana Sydney	Recurring						
Terry Chen	Shumway	Recurring						
Adina Porter	Indra		Recurring	Recurring	Recurring	Recurring	Recurring	Recurring
Alycia Debnam-Carey	Lexa		Recurring	Recurring				
Alycia Debnam-Carey	The Judge							Guest (Note: Turco and Debnam-Carey are credited as "Special Appearance By" in the end credits of the series finale.)
Toby Levins	Carl Emerson		Recurring	Recurring				
Chris Shields	David Miller		Recurring	Guest	Recurring			
Ty Olsson	Nyko		Recurring	Guest	Guest			
Eve Harlow	Maya Vie		Recurring				Guest	
Luc Roderique	Penn		Recurring					Recurring
Steve Talley	Kyle Wick	Guest	Recurring					
Kendall Cross	Byrne		Recurring					
Johnny Whitworth	Cage Wallace		Recurring					
Raymond J. Barry	Dante Wallace		Recurring					
Aleks Paunovic	Gustus		Recurring					
Nick Hunnings	Lee		Recurring					
Rekha Sharma	Lorelei Tsing		Recurring					
Ian Tracey	Vincent Vie		Recurring					
Luisa D'Oliveira	Emori		Guest	Recurring	Recurring	Recurring	Recurring	Recurring
Jessica Harmon	Niylah			Recurring	Recurring	Recurring	Recurring	Recurring
Erica Cerra	A.L.I.E		Guest	Recurring	Guest		Guest	
Erica Cerra	Becca Franko			Recurring	Guest	Guest		Recurring
Jonathan Whitesell	Bryan			Recurring	Guest			
Michael Beach	Charles Pike			Recurring			Guest	
Cory Gruter-Andrew	Aden			Recurring				
Donna Yamamoto	Hannah Green			Recurring				
Rhiannon Fish	Ontari			Recurring				
Neil Sandilands	Titus			Recurring				
Tati Gabrielle	Gaia				Recurring	Recurring	Recurring	Recurring
Alyson Bath	Bree	Guest			Recurring			
Nadia Hilker	Luna			Guest	Recurring			
Chai Hansen	Ilian				Recurring			
Ben Sullivan	Riley				Recurring			
Lola Flanery	Madi Griffin					Recurring	Recurring	Recurring
Ivana Milicevic	Charmaine Diyoza					Recurring	Recurring	Recurring
Jordan Bolger	Miles Shaw					Recurring	Guest	
St. John Myers	Ethan Hardy					Recurring		
William Miller	Paxton McCreary					Recurring		
Kyra Zagorsky	Kara Cooper					Recurring		
Barbara Beall	Brell					Recurring		
Mike Dopud	Michael Vinson					Recurring		
Karen Holness	Blythe Ann Workman						Recurring	Recurring
Dean Marshall	Jae Workman						Recurring	Recurring
Lee Majdoub	Nelson						Recurring	Recurring
Sara Thompson	Josephine Lightbourne I						Recurring	Guest
Camden Filtness	James Crockett						Recurring	Guest
Sarah-Jane Redmond	Kaylee Lee VII						Recurring	
Amélie Eve	Rose						Recurring	
Tattiawna Jones	Simone Lightbourne VI						Recurring	
Lucia Walters	Miranda Mason VII						Recurring	
Bethany Brown	Jade						Recurring	
Thomas Cocquerel	Ryker Desai IX						Recurring	
Ashleigh LaThorp	Delilah Workman / Priya Desai VI						Recurring	
John Pyper-Ferguson	Bill Cadogan				Guest			Recurring
Tom Stevens	Trey						Guest	Recurring
Alaina Huffman	Nikki							Recurring
Jason Diaz	Levitt							Recurring
Neal McDonough	Anders							Recurring
Jonathan Scarfe	Doucette							Recurring

== Characters ==
=== Sky People ===
Sky People (also known as Arkers, or Skaikru in Trigedasleng) is a term the Grounders use for the people who came from the international space station known as the Ark. The Sky People alive today are descendants of humans who survived the nuclear apocalypse 97 years before the series by living in space in the Ark. Within the Sky People community, there is a subgroup. Known as The 100 (also known as the delinquents), this group includes one hundred juvenile delinquents who, after it became clear that the Ark was dying, were sent to Earth in order to determine if the planet had become habitable enough for the rest of the Sky People to survive in exchange for being pardoned of their crimes. However, the name the 100 is a slight misnomer, since, along with the aforementioned hundred delinquents, there were also two additional young adults who came with them to Earth; one was a security guard who snuck aboard their ship to ensure the safety of his sister, and the other was a young engineer who came down to Earth in a pod shortly afterward to reassure the council that the delinquents survived their journey.

In the sixth season, due to everything that has happened, it is revealed that there are not many Sky People left when Abby seeks blood donations in an effort to save Marcus Kane.

=== Grounders ===
Grounders (or Outsiders, as they are known by the Mountain Men) are groups of people who were born on Earth rather than in space or in Mount Weather. The Grounders are descendants of humans who survived the nuclear apocalypse 97 years ago, due to their enhanced tolerance to nuclear radiation. Many of the Sky People have negative views toward Grounders, who they see as barbaric stone-age savages, and many Grounders have a negative view of the Sky People, who they see as hostile colonizers. Relations between the two groups slowly improve, thanks to the Grounders' commander Lexa. The Grounders speak an English-based pidgin language called Trigedasleng, although many of them also know regular English. Grounders were the primary antagonists of the first season. There are at least twelve Grounder clans in eastern North America, including the woods clan known as the Tree People (Trikru or Trigedakru in Trigedasleng), the dominant clan; Ice Nation (Azgeda), antagonists of the third season (along with A.L.I.E.) and the fourth; the Boat People (Floukru or Floudonkru); and other tribes such as Glowing Forest (Trishanakru), Rock Line (Boudalankru), Broadleaf (Yujleda), Blue Cliff (Ouskejonkru), Plains-riders (Ingranronakru), Shallow Valley (Louwoda-Klironkru), the Desert Clan (Sankru or Sangedakru), the Lake People (Podakru), and the Delphi (Delfikru).

As revealed in "Anaconda", the Grounders were founded by Callie Cadogan and her followers, who left the Second Dawn bunker after taking Nightblood and the Flame. Having enough Nightblood for 2,000 more people, they intended to seek out and help other survivors of the nuclear apocalypse. Trigedasleng was a language created by Callie when she was only ten years old. The word Trikru appears to have been inspired by an environmentalist group that Callie was a part of before the apocalypse called Tree Crew, pronounced the same. In "The Dying of the Light", an Azgeda symbol on the floor of the bunker suggests that they were responsible for burying Earth's Anomaly Stone, though how, why and when remains unrevealed.

=== Mountain Men ===
Mountain Men (or Maunon in Trigedasleng) is the small colony of people who reside in Mount Weather. They are the primary antagonists of the second season. The Mountain Men (a term encompassing the women and children as well) are descendants of humans who survived the nuclear apocalypse 97 years before the start of the series by bunkering down inside Mount Weather, protecting them from the radiation caused by the bombing, but also preventing them from developing an immunity to the radiation as the Grounders did. This not only forced them to remain inside the facility unless they wore protective suits, they also had no choice but to capture Grounders and harvest their blood, which they used for transfusions to survive even the small amount of radiation exposure they received inside Mount Weather. The Mountain Men are responsible for creating the acid fog that has killed numerous outsiders, as well as the barbaric Reapers who helped them capture Grounders for their blood-harvesting program. Because so many Grounder and Arker lives were lost in the name of the Mountain Men's survival, both groups hold very negative views toward those residing in Mount Weather, although some people within the mountain actively reject treatment with the blood stolen from Grounders unless absolutely necessary, for moral reasons. In the second season, while holding forty-seven of the 100 prisoners, the Mountain Men discovered that a transfusion of bone marrow from the former Ark residents could grant them permanent immunity from the radiation, but the eventually fatal consequences for captured Arkers of the marrow-harvesting drive Clarke to a point where she is forced to open the air filtration system of the mountain, killing every one of the Mountain Men in order to save her own people. The Mountain Men are finally extinct when Clarke kills Carl Emerson, the last of the Mountain Men living in the third season.

=== Eligius IV prisoners ===
The ship Eligius IV was carrying prisoners and was deployed to asteroid Proxima VI before the nuclear apocalypse on Earth happened. The purpose of the expedition was to mine Hythylodium. In 2047, the prisoners started to become sick and the captain issued "Order 11", which would abandon the prisoners on the asteroid. Out of altruistic reasons, one of the ship's pilots Miles Shaw deactivated the shock collars of prisoners that led to the massacre of the ship's crew and an explosion that destroyed one of the engines. Led by Charmaine Diyoza, the prisoners decide to return to the post-apocalyptic Earth but with an engine destroyed, it would take decades to reach there. The prisoners put themselves through cryosleep to evade aging. In 2156, Shaw piloted the transport craft Gagarin and lands Diyoza with a party of prisoners in the Shallow Valley, which is apparently the only habitable place left after the radiation wave Praimfaya in the fourth-season finale. They act as antagonists in the fifth season and are eventually defeated, but the lives of those who surrendered are spared. The prisoners' second leader McCreary launches the Damocles bomb against Shallow Valley in an act of scorched earth, destroying the valley and rendering the Earth uninhabitable. Even decades later the Earth fails to recover and as a result, is deemed permanently uninhabitable. In season 7's "From the Ashes", its stated that there are 36 prisoners left alive in Sanctum, while Diyoza is on another planet. The prisoners have been released to help build a new compound on Sanctum for everyone to live in. In "False Gods", Hatch, who had been imprisoned for bank robbery and murder, as well as three others die stopping a nuclear reactor meltdown, leaving 33 prisoners alive. In "The Flock", another prisoner is killed by a member of Wonkru following a hostage situation, reducing their population to 32. In "A Little Sacrifice", Diyoza sacrifices herself to stop Gen-9 from being released on Bardo, leaving 31 prisoners. In "The Stranger", the surviving prisoners bow to the Dark Commander's leadership. In "The Last War," the prisoners help Raven to rescue her friends from the bunker and join Wonkru in holding off the Disciples before Transcending with the rest of the human race.

=== Wonkru ===
Wonkru is a new, united clan, consisting of the former eleven remaining Grounder clans (all of Floukru died) and Skaikru, founded by Octavia Blake. Later, they are now led by the new Commander, named Madi. After the Flame is destroyed, many of Wonkru abandon the leadership of Clarke and her friends though some remain on their side. With the situation getting progressively worse, Indra attempts to get Madi to retake command without success. Instead, John Murphy and Emori convince Indra, who they realize was the true power behind Wonkru in the bunker, to take leadership of the clan herself. Indra is able to reunite Wonkru under her command with only one warrior, Knight, trying without success to challenge her.

=== Sanctumites ===
With Earth running out of oil, a colonization mission was sent out on Eligius III to five potentially habitable worlds. Alpha, later renamed Sanctum by Josephine Lightbourne, was a habitable moon settled by Mission Team Alpha who later became the ruling families, known as the Primes, with their leader, Russell Lightbourne. Although some of the Sanctum Citizens are potentially descendants of the Primes themselves, they had landed on Sanctum with a thousand frozen embryos to start the colony which is the most likely origin of most of the people, though the remaining embryos were eventually destroyed by Gabriel Santiago. Taught to revere the Primes as living divinity due to their ability to resurrect themselves through Nightblood hosts, the citizens eventually rebel at the end of the sixth season after learning the truth, leading to the death of most of the Primes. In the seventh season, the Sanctum Citizens struggle to adapt to their new reality while tensions rise between the various factions on the moon. Some are subsequently slaughtered by Sheidheda. John Murphy takes command of the survivors to hide out and prepare to fight the Dark Commander's new reign.

=== Children of Gabriel ===
The Children of Gabriel is a rebel militia group, who are in conflict with the Primes, the twelve quasi-immortal leaders of Sanctum. They were founded by Gabriel Santiago, also known as the Old Man, who was once the Thirteenth Prime but rebelled seventy years before the present after recognizing the immorality of what the Primes were doing. Gabriel is known as a demon to the people of Sanctum and an almost mythical figure amongst his followers, having been missing for ten years. Unknown to the Children of Gabriel, Gabriel has been hiding amongst them as Xavier, a high-ranking and less extreme member of the organization, having been unwillingly resurrected in Xavier's body after his last host died. After the overthrow and death of most of the Primes, the organization moves back into Sanctum under the leadership of Nelson and pushes for the execution of Russell Lightbourne, the last Prime. Due to many being abandoned as children, they are unaware of the identity of their families in Sanctum even if their parents are still alive as discovered by Nelson when he returned following the successful rebellion. Though Emori tries to reunite them with their families, the Children of Gabriel ally with the remaining Eligius prisoners and take hostages in an effort to reveal the truth. Wonkru, with the help of Sheidheda, manages to stop the uprising and takes the Children of Gabriel into custody.

In "The Stranger", the Children of Gabriel are massacred by Sheidheda with an assault rifle when they refuse to kneel. The only survivor aside from Gabriel himself is a teenager named Luca who plays dead amongst the corpses. Luca is later found and rescued by Indra who brings him to Murphy and Emori for protection.

In "A Sort of Homecoming", Gabriel is killed by Sheidheda, leaving Luca as the only survivor of the group.

=== The Disciples ===
A mysterious group from another planet called Bardo. Though human, not much is known about them or their origins except that they are fanatically religious in some manner and that their current leader is named Anders. After finding Skyring due to a message in a bottle sent through the Anomaly by Octavia Blake, they captured Octavia and Charmaine Diyoza, later formed some sort of deal with Diyoza's daughter Hope and turned Skyring into a prison planet for their unbelievers. They are first encountered on Sanctum when several members kidnap Bellamy Blake through the Anomaly and attempt to capture Echo and Gabriel Santiago while targeting Hope for death. Three members are killed by Echo, revealing that they are humans with advanced technology, but not much else. After discovering that Skyring is one of the other planets on the Eligius III colony mission, Gabriel suggests that Bardo was another Eligius planet as well and that the Disciples are the descendants of one of the other Eligius mission teams who settled on Bardo like the people on Sanctum. It is later revealed that their full name is the Disciples of a Greater Truth and that they worship a mysterious figure called the Shepherd that saved them from the destruction of Earth. The Disciples believe in "the war to end all wars" which Clarke Griffin supposedly holds the key to winning. Disciple warriors hold rankings going up to at least Level 12 which appears to be a Master level. Of the named Disciples, Dev was a Level 7 while Orlando was a Level 12 who trained other Disciples and was on one occasion shown to be addressed as "Master Orlando". Gabriel, Echo and Hope later realize that the Disciples are not Eligius descendants but instead came directly from Earth through the Anomaly. Nathan Miller and Niylah later discover a sigil that suggests a connection between the Disciples and the Second Dawn doomsday cult that built the bunker that Wonkru survived in. Its later revealed that the Shepherd is Bill Cadogan, the founder and leader of the Second Dawn who has been kept alive in stasis by the Disciples.

In "Anaconda", its revealed that the Disciples were originally the Second Dawn cult who had started worshipping Bill Cadogan by the time that Becca Franko had arrived on Earth two years after the first nuclear apocalypse. By the time they left for Bardo, those faithful to Cadogan were already called Disciples and were able to open the Anomaly with the help of Becca and the Flame. Their belief in the "war to end all wars" comes from Becca finding a combination using the Flame that showed her Judgment Day, the true end of the human race. However, they need the Flame, the key that they are searching for, to find the correct combination.

In "The Flock", its revealed that the Disciples train themselves to focus on the good of the community and not the individual. Rather than having families, the Disciples are grown from embryos in incubators during which time they can be perfected to remove various conditions. Their numbers are left limited however due to a lack of resources to maintain a massive population. The war that they believe is coming is with the enemy that destroyed the native Bardoans.

In "A Little Sacrifice", its revealed that the Disciples believe that Clarke has the Flame due to seeing Octavia's memory of Clarke using the AI to destroy A.L.I.E. Neither Octavia nor any of Clarke's other friends ever revealed that Clarke only had the Flame for a short period of time and has long-since removed it. Cadogan explains to Gabriel Santiago, Niylah and Jordan Green that upon arriving on Bardo, the Disciples found logs left by the native Bardoans describing their use of the Anomaly Stone. After centuries of translating, the Disciples were able to decipher the logs which described a similar effect to what Becca experienced when she entered the final code into the Anomaly Stone and spoke of reaching Transcendence and supposedly a Last War that needs to be fought, the source of the Disciples belief system. After taking a closer look at the logs, Jordan comes to believe that the Bardoan language is structured similar to the Korean language which Jordan learned from his father and as a result, the Disciples may have mistranslated the message. Jordan's translation of the logs suggest not a Last War but a test, most likely involving one individual who uses the code representing their species to determine that race's future. The three decide to keep this to themselves as they know that Bill Cadogan is the wrong man to represent humanity in such a test if Jordan is in fact right.

In "The Last War," the Disciple army enters into a standoff with Wonkru and the Eligius prisoners while Cadogan takes the test, Jordan having been proven right that it was a test and not a Last War. Cadogan is killed by Clarke while Sheidheda initiates a battle between the two sides. After Indra kills Sheidheda, Octavia is able to talk both sides down. This convinces the Judge that humanity is worthy the human race Transcends, achieving the Disciples goal.

== Main cast ==
=== Clarke Griffin ===
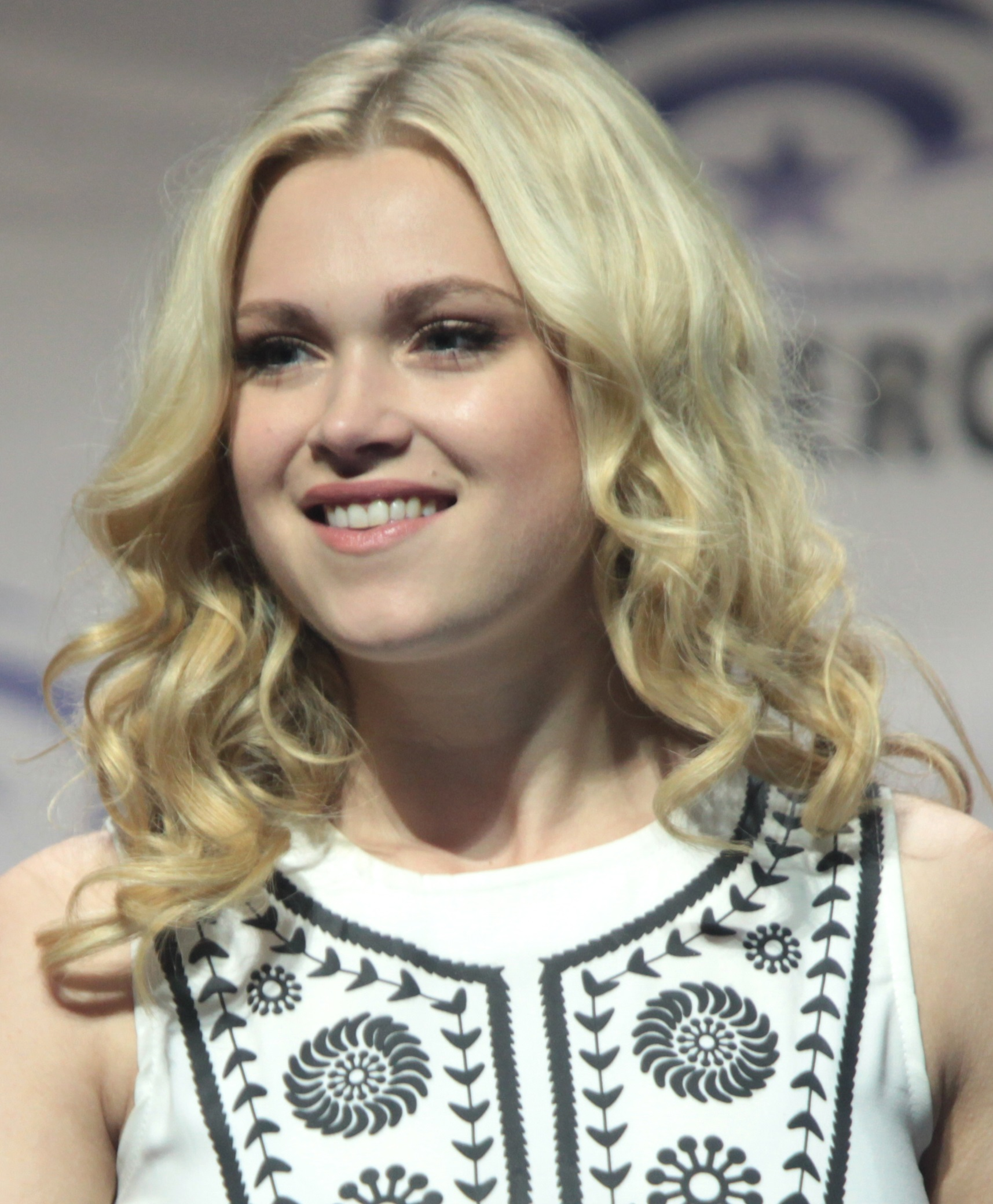
Eliza Taylor portrays the role of Clarke.

Portrayed by Eliza Taylor, Clarke Griffin, the daughter of Abigail Griffin and Jake Griffin, functions as the effective leader of the 100 for much of the series. Her backstory is that she was imprisoned as an accessory to the crimes of her father after attempting to inform their people that the Ark was dying, and thus ended up among the 100. Down on the ground, she tries to ensure the 100's survival by assisting in the acquisition of food and resources, and she also continuously serves as their main medic before her mother and the other medical staff join them on Earth. She is portrayed as relatively benevolent, but can act ruthlessly to fight or kill in order to protect her people if there are no other options, and she possesses natural leadership qualities with the help (and early on, the opposition) of Bellamy. They learn to love each other. After killing the entire Mountain Men population to save her fellow Sky People, Clarke becomes known in Trigedasleng as Wanheda (literally "The Commander of Death") and is sometimes also called "Mountain-slayer". Clarke becomes gradually hardened and matured by her experiences on Earth, namely the acts she has been forced to commit to survive and protect her people. This transforms her into a strong but personally troubled heroine in the series, as she continues to struggle to reunify humankind by maintaining the uneasy peace between the Arkers and some of the Grounders, and between groups among her own people. On February 28, 2015, the series creator Jason Rothenberg confirmed that Clarke is bisexual; this makes her the first openly bisexual lead character on the CW network. In the sixth season, Clarke's body is possessed by the consciousness of Josephine Lightbourne, but Clarke herself survives a mind-wipe due to a remnant of the A.L.I.E. AI. Josephine later relinquishes control to Clarke to escape a decapitation, though the two continue to share her body. After Josephine manages to remain inside of Clarke's body even after the Mind Drive is removed, Clarke destroys Josephine's consciousness for good and regains full permanent control of her body. Shortly afterwards, Clarke loses her mother when Abby is mind-wiped to become the new host for Josephine's mother, Simone. Clarke is subsequently forced to blow Simone and anything left of Abby into space in self-defense, something that, along with her adopted daughter Madi becoming possessed by the Dark Commander, causes her to almost commit suicide, but Madi retakes control and arrests Russell. In the series finale, Clarke is the sole human not to achieve Transcendence, but her surviving friends decide to return to human form and join her in living out the rest of their lives on a regenerated Earth.

=== Bellamy Blake ===
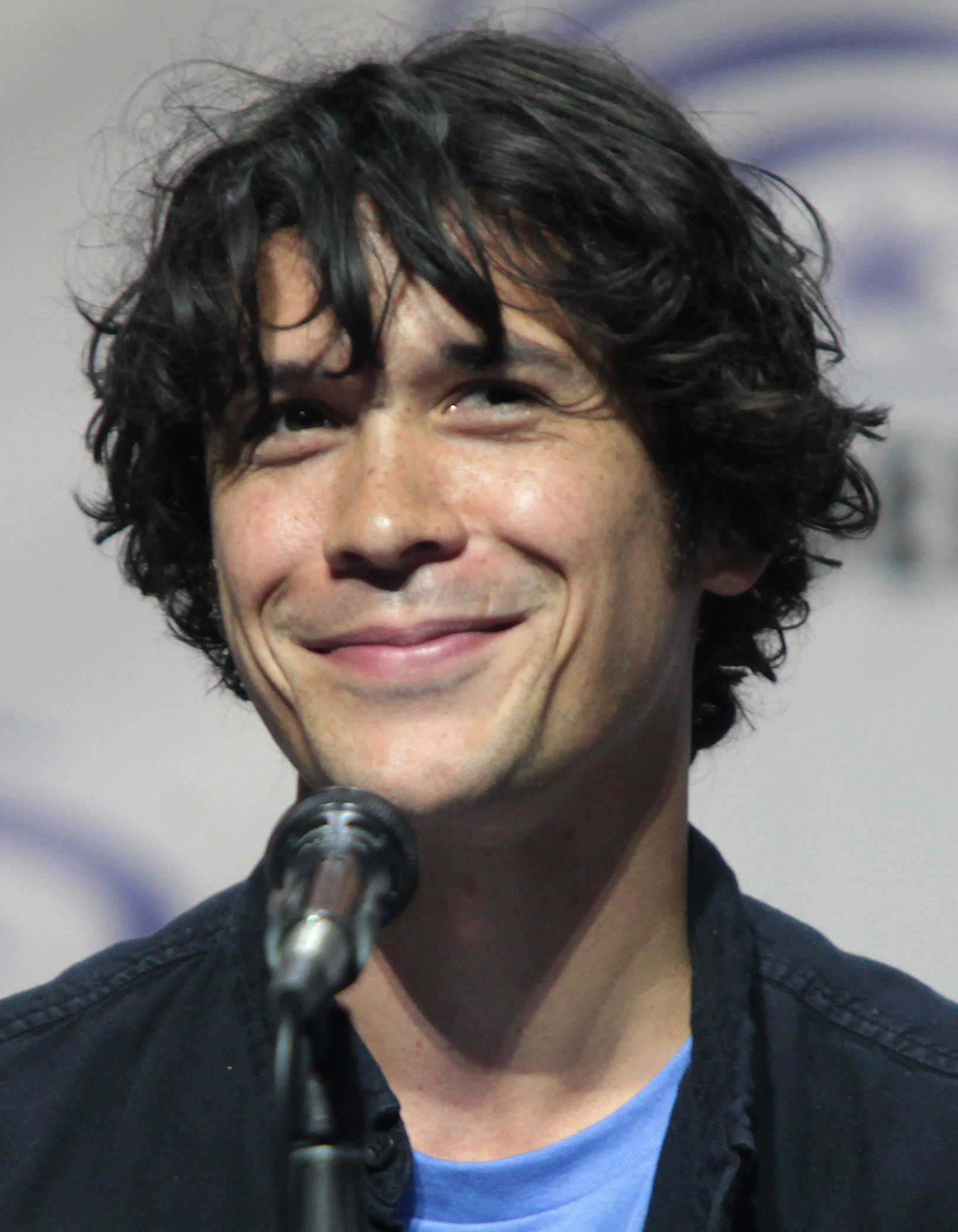
Bob Morley portrays the role of Bellamy.

Portrayed by Bob Morley, Bellamy Blake is the Co-leader of the 100, leader of the Skaikru and The Heart in the lead dynamic [The Head and The Heart] of the show. He's also Octavia's half brother. He professes a strong determination to protect his sister, spanning from her birth. He often says "my sister, my responsibility", something their mother had told him when Octavia was born. He was the leader of the 100 and described as the one who inspires masses. He's often inspired by Clarke after a tumultuous start to their relationship. He and Clarke develop a mutual respect and learn to compromise for each other's methods. He still feels guilty for his mother's death.

In the second season, he went undercover in Mount Weather, which was a huge risk, to save 40 of his people who were held captive to extract their bone marrow. In the end he along with Clarke were able to save all of their people, although they had to kill everyone in Mount Weather, over three hundred people, after being betrayed by Lexa and the Grounder army.

In the third season, he saw Clarke while she was a prisoner of Roan. In order to save her he took a huge risk by dressing as a grounder and crossed an army of grounders in order to retrieve Clarke but his attempt resulted in him being knocked out. Clarke sacrificed her freedom to prevent him from getting killed. He was manipulated by the new Chancellor after Azgeda (Ice Nation) bombed Mt Weather, killing 49 people, including his new girlfriend, Gina. In the process, he betrays Marcus Kane and put the whole of The Ark at risk of death. The bombing was made possible because Bellamy trusted Echo, the Grounder he saved in the previous season in Mt Weather. He listened to the false information she delivered in order to save Clarke. After Pike's election, Bellamy is one of the nine guards (along with Pike himself) that carry out the chancellor's orders to kill the 299 Grounder warriors sent by Lexa. Bellamy soon feels guilt for his actions, and while he saves Indra's life, this puts a rift between him and Octavia, as well as Kane. Pike gains more power with Bellamy's help, resulting in the tragic death of Lincoln, Octavia's lover. He remains one of the few people not taken over by A.L.I.E., and fights alongside Octavia and Pike to stop her.

In the fourth season, he saved his people, including Riley, who were held as slaves by an Ice Nation gang. His determination to save his people often puts him in danger. Afterward, he reconciled with Kane. He is often on the grounders' side, feeling it is selfish for the Sky People to hog all the places in the bunker. In the finale he had to leave Clarke behind on the ground in order to reach the Ark.

In the fifth season, it is revealed he survived on the Ark in space. After being reunited with Octavia, he feels he does not recognize her anymore due to her brutal and unforgiving ways, but still tries to get through to her. It was also his idea to try and take the cryogenically frozen prisoners hostage and have leverage with Diyoza in order to save Clarke. He also made Madi realize that they had made mistakes and asked her to forgive the Eligius crew and they all boarded the ship at his request. Also, his denial to board the ship without all of his people on board indicated his PTSD regarding leaving Clarke behind in S4 finale. He also poisoned his own sister to spare Clarke's life thus indicating a shift in his priority.

In the sixth season he's still feeling guilt over Monty and Harper's along with several of his friends death which resulted in a conflict between him and Echo. When Clarke was body-snatched by the Primes it was him who recognized it wasn't her in Clarke's body which resulted in him being knocked out. He's also the one who learns Clarke is still alive based on a Morse code message Clarke sent him. Bellamy kidnaps Josephine in an effort to save Clarke, leading to a conversation between Bellamy and Josephine about the complexity of his relationship with Clarke. After an attempt by Gabriel Santiago to remove Josephine fails, Bellamy desperately performs CPR on a dying Clarke and urges her to fight. Hearing him, Clarke destroys Josephine's consciousness and is reunited with Bellamy and Octavia. Angry at his sister, Bellamy maintains a distance from her, eventually stating that while Octavia is still his sister, she is no longer his responsibility. Together, Bellamy and Clarke work to overthrow the Primes with minimal bloodshed, though Clarke loses her mother in the process. At the end of the season, Bellamy witnesses Octavia be stabbed by Hope Diyoza and then mysteriously vanish into the Anomaly.

In the seventh season, Bellamy is abducted by the mysterious Disciples through the Anomaly, chased by Echo, Gabriel Santiago and Hope Diyoza. After escaping their grasp, Bellamy attempts to rescue Octavia who negotiates for Bellamy to be returned to Sanctum instead of risking his life. However, after Anders opens the Anomaly, a dying Disciple detonates a grenade and Bellamy vanishes when the explosion clears. Bellamy is presumed dead by everyone else, driving Echo into a genocidal grief and rage against the Disciples. It's later revealed that Bellamy and his hostage the Conductor were flung through the Anomaly to Etherea where they were forced to work together over the course of at least two months to survive. Bellamy's experiences on Etherea cause him to devote himself to the Disciple cause and betray his friends when he returns to Bardo.

In "Blood Giant", after Bellamy refuses to stand down, he is shot and killed by Clarke. After being informed of Bellamy's death in "A Sort of Homecoming", Octavia and Echo tell Clarke that they lost the real Bellamy a long time ago and his need for a meaning and a cause killed him, not Clarke.

In "The Last War," Bellamy's beliefs about Transcendence are proven to be correct. However, Bellamy does not Transcend due to his earlier death and the fact that only the living can achieve Transcendence.

=== Cece Cartwig ===
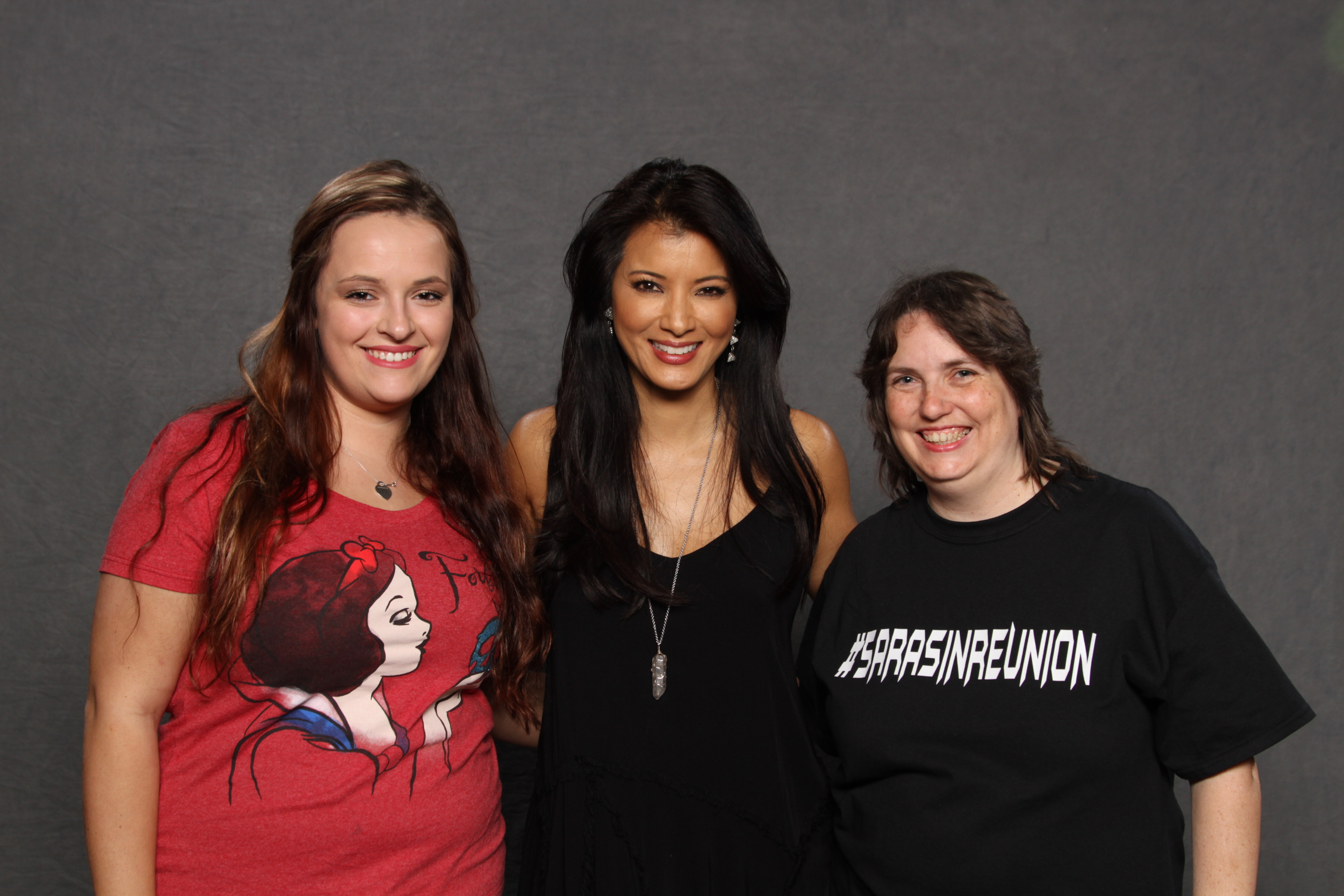
Kelly Hu

Portrayed by Kelly Hu, Callie "Cece" Cartwig (season 1) is the best friend of Abigail Griffin as well as the Ark's communications officer. Callie is first seen talking to the people on The Ark about the 100 going down to Earth. She said that she cannot confirm or deny anything at the moment. When Callie learns that Abby is going to be executed she goes up to Marcus Kane to tell him that he is out of his mind and he cannot kill everyone who disagrees with him. Callie says that Abby is her friend leaving Kane to reply that he cannot do anything to stop it. Kane and Callie share a close moment. She tries to implore him to give Abby amnesty, asking him to think of their own relationship. He answers by saying that no matter what he feels, he cannot. When it is time, Callie breaks into tears walking with Abby to the place where she will be executed, embracing her and refusing to let go even at the behest of the guards. Abby asks that Callie watch out for her daughter before she dies. When the door is about to close Chancellor Thelonious Jaha demands the execution be stopped immediately and pardons Abby. Callie is thrilled for Abby, able to hold her friend again. Jason Rothenberg revealed that Hu was dropped after the first episode due to budget reasons, resulting in Callie's death offscreen.

=== Abby Griffin ===
Portrayed by Paige Turco, Abigail "Abby" Griffin (seasons 1–6; guest season 7) is Clarke's mother. She is the chief medical officer of the Ark and the main proponent regarding the habitable status of Earth. Her husband was the chief engineer, Jake Griffin. She was a member of the Council led by Chancellor Jaha on the Ark before being stripped of her title, though she regained this position shortly afterward. Upon her arrival on Earth, Abby was Chancellor for a time when Marcus Kane gave her his pin. During this time she ruled autocratically, refusing to let Kane take over again on his return and betraying her former friend Jaha by putting him in prison. Abby becomes friends with Raven Reyes when she needs her mechanical expertise to try to get more information on what the 100 is dealing with on the ground. She begins to like the young engineer due to her reminding her of Clarke. Abby's relationship with her daughter became strained following Clarke's discovery of her mother's betrayal to her father which led to his execution. It only became more complicated once Abby and the rest of the people from the Ark joined the 100 on Earth, as they were both the leaders of their respective groups of people. Abby continues to work as the resident doctor in the newly established Sky People colony known as Arkadia (formally Camp Jaha) and has supported Marcus Kane's campaign for peaceful cohabitation with the Grounders, putting her at odds with the anti-Grounder factions within their people.

In season six's "Adjustment Protocol", Abby becomes a Nightblood to help save Clarke's adopted daughter Madi. Abby is subsequently mind-wiped by Russell Lightbourne, effectively killing her and her body becomes the new host for Simone Lightbourne. In "The Blood of Sanctum", Clarke holds out hope that Abby survived in the same way that she did, but Russell confirms that Abby is truly gone. After a failed attempt by Simone to pose as Abby, Clarke blows Simone and several others out into space, killing them all. Abby's body is last seen floating away into deep space. In "From the Ashes", Clarke struggles with Abby's death while Murphy struggles with guilt over his role in it. Russell later returns Abby's things to Clarke in an attempt to get Clarke to kill him.

In "The Last War," the Judge takes on the form of Abby when Raven takes the test to determine if the human race will Transcend or be annihilated. The Judge comments that while Abby is not Raven's mother, her opinion and judgment of Raven matters more to the young woman than that of her own biological mother.

=== Finn Collins ===
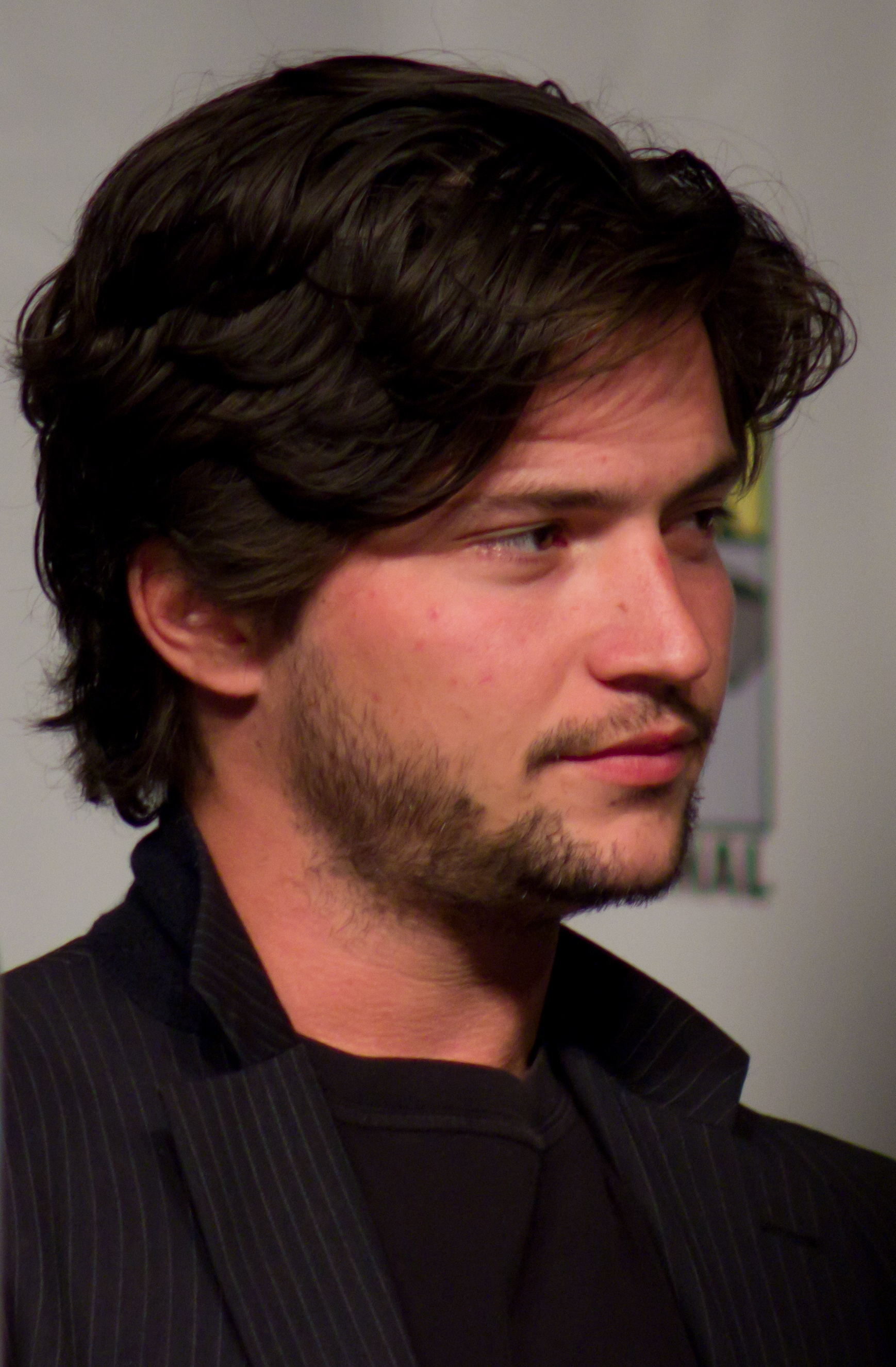
Thomas McDonell portrays the role of Finn.

Portrayed by Thomas McDonell, Finn Collins (seasons 1–2) is a caring teenager who is always looking for fun and a peaceful solution. He is more interested in helping others than seeking vengeance. He was arrested for being a spacewalker and wasting the Ark's limited oxygen supply, but it was revealed that he was innocent and had taken the fall for Raven, his girlfriend, to ensure she did not ruin her engineering career or get floated. Originally Clarke's love interest, Finn's relationship with Clarke starts collapsing when she discovers his relationship with Raven. His romances with both girls ultimately end, but Finn and Clarke still love each other, and Raven still loves Finn. In the second season, his fear that Clarke has been killed by her captors in addition to the hardships he has endured cause him to become unpredictable and violent. He murders eighteen unarmed Grounders who he believed had taken Clarke hostage, and was willingly going to leave several fellow Arkers for dead in favor of continuing his search for her. As a result of his actions, the Grounders demanded retribution before they will agree to a truce between them and the Sky People, leading Commander Lexa to sentence Finn to death by a thousand cuts. However, he was mercifully killed by Clarke to prevent the Grounders from slowly and painfully killing him, though he did appear one last time during Clarke's grief-induced hallucinations.

=== Wells Jaha ===
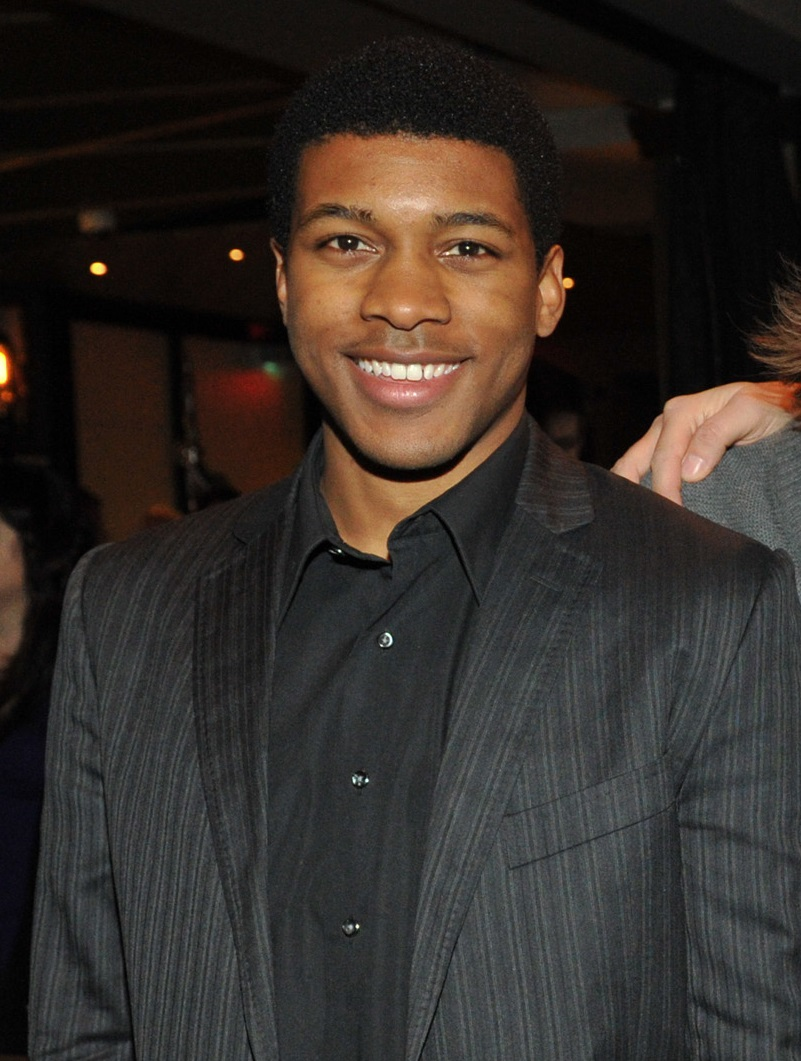
Eli Goree portrays the role of Wells.

Portrayed by Eli Goree, Wells Jaha (season 1; guest season 2) was Clarke's childhood best friend and the son of Thelonious Jaha, who was the Ark's Chancellor at the start of the series. He is despised by some of the 100 upon landing on the ground because of his father. He intentionally committed a crime when he found out about the imminent launch of the delinquents to Earth so as to join the group in the hope to protect Clarke, for whom he harbors feelings. Clarke believed he was the reason her father is dead, only to find out later that her mother was the one who betrayed her father, and Wells willingly took the blame to prevent Clarke from hating her. On the ground, he is hardworking and thoughtful, volunteering to dig graves and collect rainwater to aid their newly established colony. It was his expert knowledge of botany that made him a valuable ally to Clarke, as she was tasked as the 100's medic due to her previous experience as the daughter of a doctor and needed herbal medicines to treat the ill and injured members of their community. He was murdered by Charlotte in the third episode, who wanted retribution for his father's execution of her parents on the Ark. He appears once again in the second season, when a hypoxic Thelonious hallucinates that Wells is alive and with him on the Ark, when everyone else has left for the surface. When Thelonious falls under A.L.I.E.'s influence, he forgets about Wells and has to be reminded by A.L.I.E., causing Abby to realize that something is wrong with him.

=== Octavia Blake ===
Portrayed by Marie Avgeropoulos (and by Olivia Steele Falconer as child) Octavia Blake is Bellamy's younger sister – a rare relationship given the Ark's one-child rule. She was kept a secret by her family, living under the floor to avoid detection by authorities, but was eventually caught when Bellamy snuck her out of her room to attend a masked ball. Once discovered, some of the detainees discriminate against her for being a second child and thus an outcast to the Ark's dystopian society. She is a fiercely independent girl who is constantly rebelling and getting attention from men, most notably the Grounder Lincoln. However, just like Clarke, she is not exactly built for war so she is horrified at what she sees and experiences at first. In the second season, she becomes more immersed in Grounder culture and serves as Indra's second. Originally she felt hatred towards Clarke for being the daughter of someone in the same council who had her locked up. It is intensified when she discovers Clarke knew about the bombing of Tondc, did nothing about it, and allowed all those Grounders to die after the events of Mount Weather (even telling Indra that she will not leave behind Bellamy and her friends). She remains in her Grounder gear, and berates Lincoln for wearing an Ark jacket and for being naive as she still holds a grudge towards them. Eventually, Lincoln is brutally killed in front of her by Pike, causing a rift between her and Bellamy. In the fourth season, she shows more signs of being bloodthirsty after killing an ambassador who questions Roan's leadership. This new violent attitude earned her the nickname Skairipa ('Sky-reaper') or Death from Above. After refusing to kill Illian and getting close with him she decides to drop the act and take him home. She later accepts the fact that she is a killer and will fight in the Grounder battle for the bunker alongside Trikru, in which she is victorious after killing Luna, and becoming the acting leader of all 12 clans by telling them they will share the bunker. She finally forgives Bellamy for Lincoln's death after he opened the bunker realizing that he would put his own life in danger just to save her and the Grounders. She later protects Nilyah and further solidified her role as new leader by saying if Skaikru does not choose the 100 people to stay in the bunker then she will kill every Skaikru member. In the season finale, she officially becomes the new leader of the new Grounder tribe consisting of Skaikru, Trikru, Azgeda, and other Grounder clans, regardless of her blood and what is in her head.

In the fifth season, although still reluctant on being the leader, she tries to make peace with everyone. Eventually, overpopulation prevents from any real peace inside the bunker, so Octavia takes matters into her own hands and kills anyone who defies her or questions her view of what peace should be. Thus covering herself in their blood and being told by Gaia that it is best she keeps the blood on her, thus becoming Blodreina (the Red Queen) and decides anyone who breaks her laws must compete in deathmatches. During two years in the bunker, Abby's actions caused Octavia to become more dark and hateful that led to her ruthless actions as ruler of Wonkru, including murdering anyone who tries to defect, killing some of her own people in order to force them to stay alive when the only source of protein is their own dead, and culminating in her burning down the Hydrofarm in the bunker in order to force a conflict for the Shadow Valley rather than negotiating peace. Near the fifth-season finale, she later has a change of heart, after realizing that she broke Wonkru. In the season finale, a remorseful Octavia unexpectedly helps Abby save Kane's life after a confrontation between the two women in which Octavia appeared to be torn between leaving or killing Kane.

In the sixth season, she is exiled on Sanctum by Bellamy and works with Diyoza who was also exiled. After being poisoned, Octavia seeks healing from the mysterious Anomaly with the help of Gabriel Santiago. After being healed, Octavia decides to seek redemption for her actions and declares herself to be "Blodreina no more." At the end of season six, Octavia is stabbed by Diyoza's adult daughter Hope and disappears into the anomaly again, leaving her fate unknown.

In the seventh season, its revealed that the Anomaly, which is in fact a wormhole, had sent Octavia to another planet named Skyring where, due to time dilation from a black hole, Octavia lived for ten years with Hope and Diyoza, forming a family and finding peace. Eventually she and Diyoza were captured by a group called the Disciples and brought to another planet named Bardo where she formed a bond with a Disciple scientist named Levitt. Hope eventually rescued Octavia with Levitt's help and sent her back to Sanctum. However, as Octavia returned to a slower time dilated planet without one of the Disciples' protective helmets, she lost her memory of everything that had happened from the moment she left Sanctum. Before leaving, Levitt tattoos Hope's biometric code on Octavia's back so she can pull the young woman back to Sanctum later which is why Hope had appeared at the end of the sixth season. In the present, Hope reveals that she had only tagged Octavia with a locator tag so that she would be pulled through the Anomaly again and she is still alive. Having been returned to Bardo, Octavia regains her lost memories and witnesses Bellamy's apparent death before being rescued by Echo, Hope and Gabriel for whom five years has gone by after getting stuck on Skyring themselves. She later dedicates herself to the Disciple cause alongside Echo, Diyoza and Gabriel, although this is revealed to be a ruse. When Clarke arrives, it's revealed that the Disciples' belief that Clarke holds the Flame comes from Octavia's memories of A.L.I.E.'s destruction. Octavia is reunited with Bellamy before he betrays them, having converted to the Disciple cause. After Clarke is forced to kill Bellamy, Octavia forgives Clarke for killing her brother and is forced to face her demons due to Clarke and her friends getting stuck on Earth, specifically in the Second Dawn bunker where Octavia had ruled as Blodreina. When Clarke returns to Bardo to rescue Madi, Octavia joins her and is reunited with Levitt who sides with the two women. The three discover that Cadogan has gotten the needed code from Madi's mind, leaving her in a catatonic state.

In "The Last War," Clarke, Octavia and Levitt fail to stop Cadogan from beginning the test to decide the fate of humanity. While Clarke kills Cadogan and takes the test herself, Octavia and Levitt join Echo in trying to stop the war between the Disciples, Wonkru and the Eligius prisoners. However, Levitt is shot and mortally wounded as is Echo while helping Octavia pull him to safety. After Indra finally kills the Dark Commander, Octavia steps between the two sides and gives a speech encouraging them to embrace peace with each other, acknowledging her own mistakes and reminding them that they are all humanity. Led by Indra and a Disciple named Kwame, both sides throw down their weapons and Raven is able to convince the Judge to change her mind about wiping out humanity. As a result, the human race, aside from Clarke, achieves Transcendence, saving Levitt and Echo's lives. As she Transcends, an amazed Octavia realizes that Bellamy was right in the end. Octavia subsequently chooses to return to human form to live out the rest of her life on Earth with her friends and Levitt.

=== Monty Green ===
Portrayed by Christopher Larkin, Monty Green (seasons 1–5, guest season 6) is a smart and tech-savvy teenager who is a valuable asset to the teens on Earth due to his pharmaceutical and engineering knowledge. He and Jasper were arrested for making illegal substances. He is best friends with Jasper and is among the 48 held in Mount Weather; he eventually escapes and reunites with his mother in the third season. He tries to help Jasper recover from the traumatic events in Mount Weather. He eventually becomes part of Chancellor Pike's cause after his friend Monroe is killed by the Grounders. In the process, he gets Marcus Kane put in prison and Lincoln killed. He eventually betrays his mother and Pike in "Stealing Fire" by helping Kane, Octavia, Harper, Miller, and Sinclair escape by feeding members of the Ark Guard faulty intel and distracting them. In "Nevermore", Monty is forced to kill his mother—who had taken A.L.I.E.'s key—after she nearly kills Octavia. In "Red Sky At Morning", Monty has sex with Harper in Arkadia, and is forced to delete and essentially kill his mother for a second time by wiping her memory from the City of Light. In the fourth season, he comes up with the idea of protecting his people by shielding Arkadia with a hydrogen generator and recruits Bellamy, Harper and Miller to procure it. When they do, they blow it up to rescue the slaves taken by the Ice Nation. There he learns that the Chief had killed his father and, instead of Monty killing him himself, he allows the slaves vengeance by freeing them. After realizing that Harper chose to stay behind in Arkadia, he decides to stay with her until she changes her mind; she is eventually convinced and they search for more people to recruit. In the fifth season, he is still with Harper but feels guilty about killing his mother and letting Jasper commit suicide. By the end of the season, it is revealed that he died with Harper after growing old together and raising their son, Jordan. 125 years after they had entered cryo sleep, the survivors of Earth are greeted by Jordan, who shows them Monty's video logs, which reveal that Earth is completely uninhabitable, but that Monty had found them a new habitable planet on which to live.

In the sixth season, though he is dead, Monty returns as a manifestation of Clarke's mind in "Nevermind". Monty appears as Clarke is giving up the fight to encourage her to keep going and helps Clarke access Josephine's most traumatizing memory in an effort to regain some control over Clarke's body. Though they fail to stop Josephine, Monty helps Clarke send Bellamy a Morse code message, revealing that she is still alive by discreetly taking control of one of Clarke's fingers.

=== Jasper Jordan ===
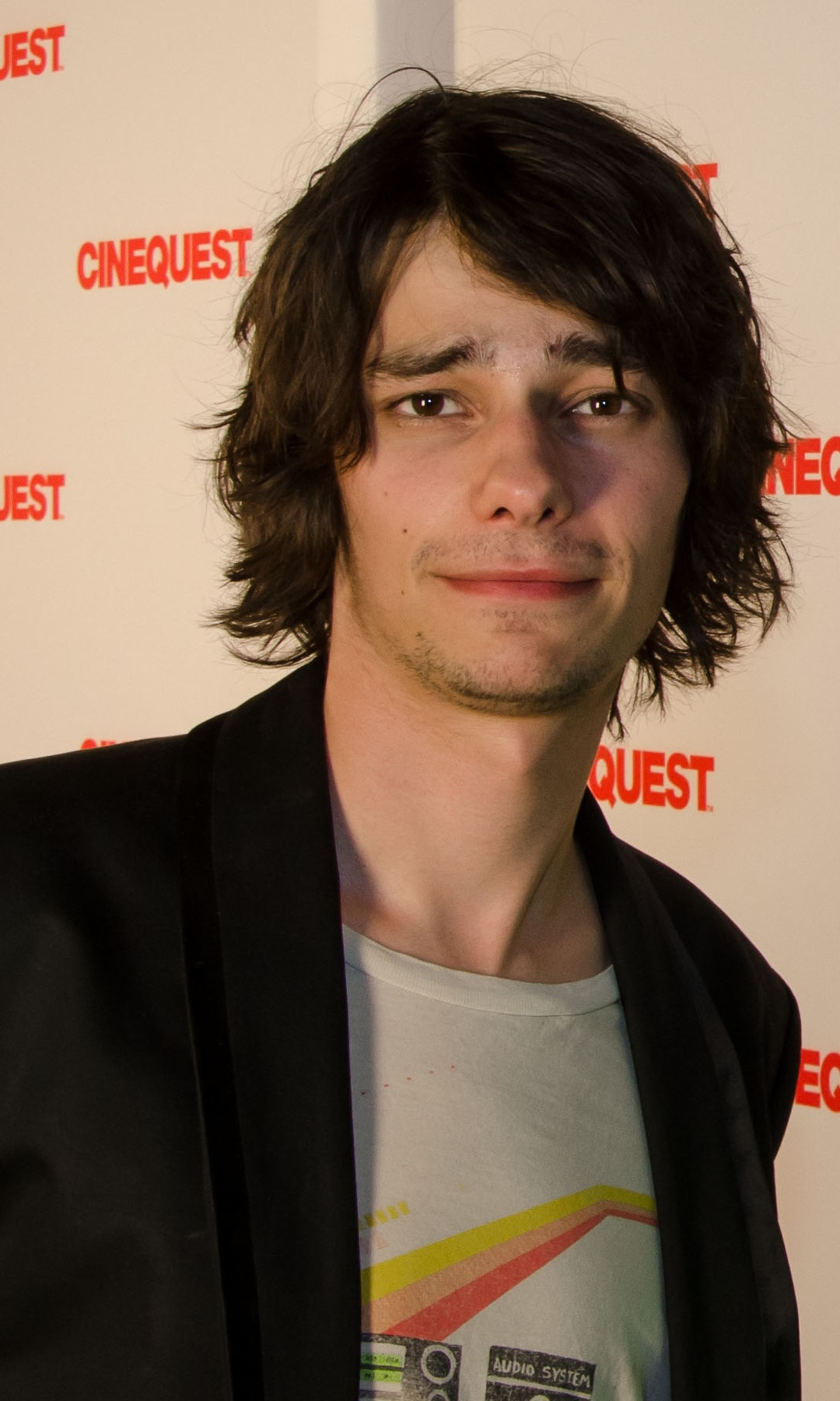
Devon Bostick portrays the role of Jasper.

Portrayed by Devon Bostick, Jasper Jordan (seasons 1–4) is a goofy and geeky chemist. He is Monty's best friend. After his capture and subsequent rescue from Grounders, he becomes traumatized by his near-death experience which he struggles to overcome. Early in the series, he has a crush on Octavia, even saving her life during an animal attack, but she offers her friendship in return instead. He was one of the delinquents' camp's gunners and is among the 48 held in Mount Weather, and becomes an acting leader of his surviving people in Clarke's and Bellamy's absences. Jasper later becomes romantically involved with a Mount Weather resident, Maya who was later killed. In grief, Jasper becomes an alcoholic and he is disgusted that his own people would steal from Mount Weather after the war with its inhabitants as well as hating Clarke. Monty and Octavia struggle to help Jasper to cope with his loss, but although Jasper was briefly tempted by the City of Light tablets, when he realised that they erased all good memories relating to painful topics, he refused to take one, even breaking Raven out of Camp Jaha and taking her to Clarke and other escapees for medical treatment to remove the chip. It is revealed that he has been chipped while on Luna's oil rig and turns on the 100 under A.L.I.E.'s command. He is freed from her control once she is defeated. In the fourth season, he attempts suicide only for Raven to tell him they only have six months to live. He eventually commits suicide by remaining at Arkadia and taking an overdose of hallucinogenic nuts, convincing several other people to join him. Monty attempts to save Jasper as the death wave approaches, but can only be at his side as he dies. In the fifth season, Clarke recovers Jasper's goggles and suicide note from the ruins of Arkadia and Monty learns that Jasper had been intending to commit suicide since he emerged from the City of Light and held a belief that they ruin everything around them. Monty and Harper later name their son Jordan Jasper Green in Jasper's honor.

=== Thelonious Jaha ===
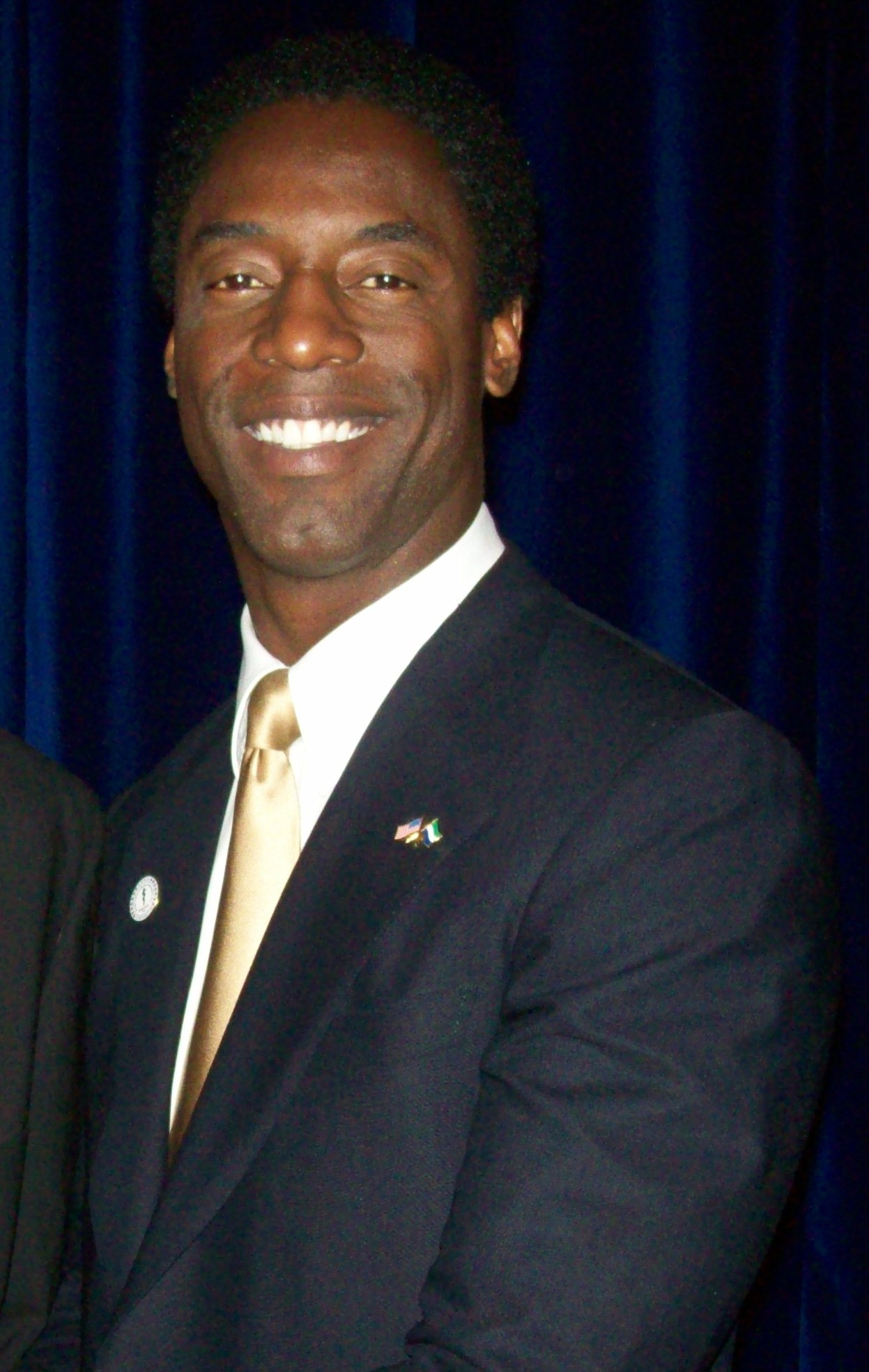
Isaiah Washington portrays the role of Thelonious.

Portrayed by Isaiah Washington, Thelonious Jaha, commonly referred to as "Jaha" (seasons 1–5) is Wells' father and the former Chancellor of the Ark. Jaha, along with Marcus, were best friends with Jake Griffin and his family. However, his and Marcus' friendship with the Griffins deteriorates after Jake's death and Clarke's subsequent arrest but he manages to maintain his friendship with Abby. He loses his power while on Earth as he clashes with Abby and Marcus over their views on the Grounders in addition to the unconfirmed destination, the "City of Light". Along with Murphy, he leads a small group of his followers from Camp Jaha to find the city. Having discovered A.L.I.E., the artificial intelligence that controls the City of Light, Jaha has become the delegated leader of A.L.I.E.'s cult, manipulating others into joining to escape the pain of daily life. Jaha is unconcerned about the side-effects even when presented with clear evidence that the City of Light erases even good memories to spare the users from psychological pain, such as Jaha having lost all memory of his son, he is soon freed from A.L.I.E.'s control after her defeat. He becomes guilt-ridden after he sees all the casualties in Polis due to him feeding everyone a chip. In the fourth season, he assists Clarke in being a leader for her people such as suggesting they find shelter in a lost bunker, only to discover it could not hold out radiation. Jaha tells everyone that if they want to survive the second nuclear explosion they must earn a lottery pick to ensure they will be on that list. He eventually comes to the realization the bunker was a decoy and the real one is in Polis, the Grounder capital, so he decides to recruit Gaia on what she knows about the symbol on the token and eventually learns it is a key to open the bunker. He eventually finds it and successfully opens it, he takes a child after promising his father to take care of him. In the fifth season, he is stabbed by an Azgeda warrior and dies in front of Kane, Abby, and Octavia. His death is avenged by Octavia who kills the warrior who had stabbed Jaha while establishing her reign as Blodreina.

=== Marcus Kane ===
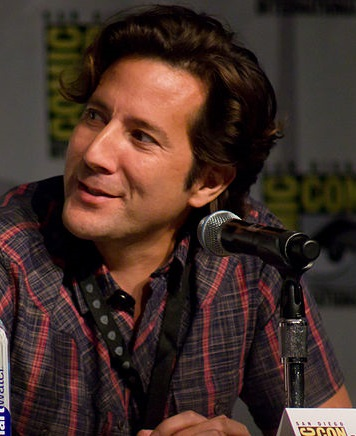
Henry Ian Cusick portrays the role of Marcus.

Portrayed by Henry Ian Cusick, Marcus Kane (seasons 1–6) is one of the Councillors on the Ark. When Thelonious Jaha was Chancellor, he was second-in-command. He, along with Jaha, were friends with Jake Griffin and his family, but his friendship with them did not last after Jake's execution and Clarke's subsequent arrest. Though he initially supports population culls to extend life on the Ark, when Earth is shown to be survivable, he is guilt-stricken and works with everyone to survive in hopes of making amends of his past misdeeds. This, in addition to his mother's influence and death, affect his later actions of seeking peaceful and compromising solutions when governing his people after arriving on Earth. In the process, he gains allies who respect his new approaches, rebuilds his friendship with Jake's wife Abby Griffin, and earns the Grounders commander Lexa's trust. Kane aligns himself with Abby, who becomes Jaha's successor, avoid becoming a Chancellor so that he make decisions for his people on his own terms. In the fifth season, six years after Praimfaya he takes the fall for Abby's crime and proceeds to fight in gladiator battles but refuses once Octavia shows signs of being a dictator. After being severely injured in the fifth-season finale, he is put into stasis and remains there in the sixth season after a failed attempt to save his life. Kane's mind is eventually transferred into the body of a young man named Gavin to save his life, erasing Gavin's mind in the process. In "What You Take With You", Kane decides to commit suicide rather than continuing to live in someone else's body. After awakening Indra and leading a coup against the Primes on Eligius IV, Kane says a final goodbye to Abby before having Indra blow him out of an airlock along with the new Nightblood serum. In "Adjustment Protocol", when Abby is mind-wiped to become the new host of Simone Lightbourne, she remembers Kane in her last moments alongside her daughter and deceased husband.

=== Raven Reyes ===
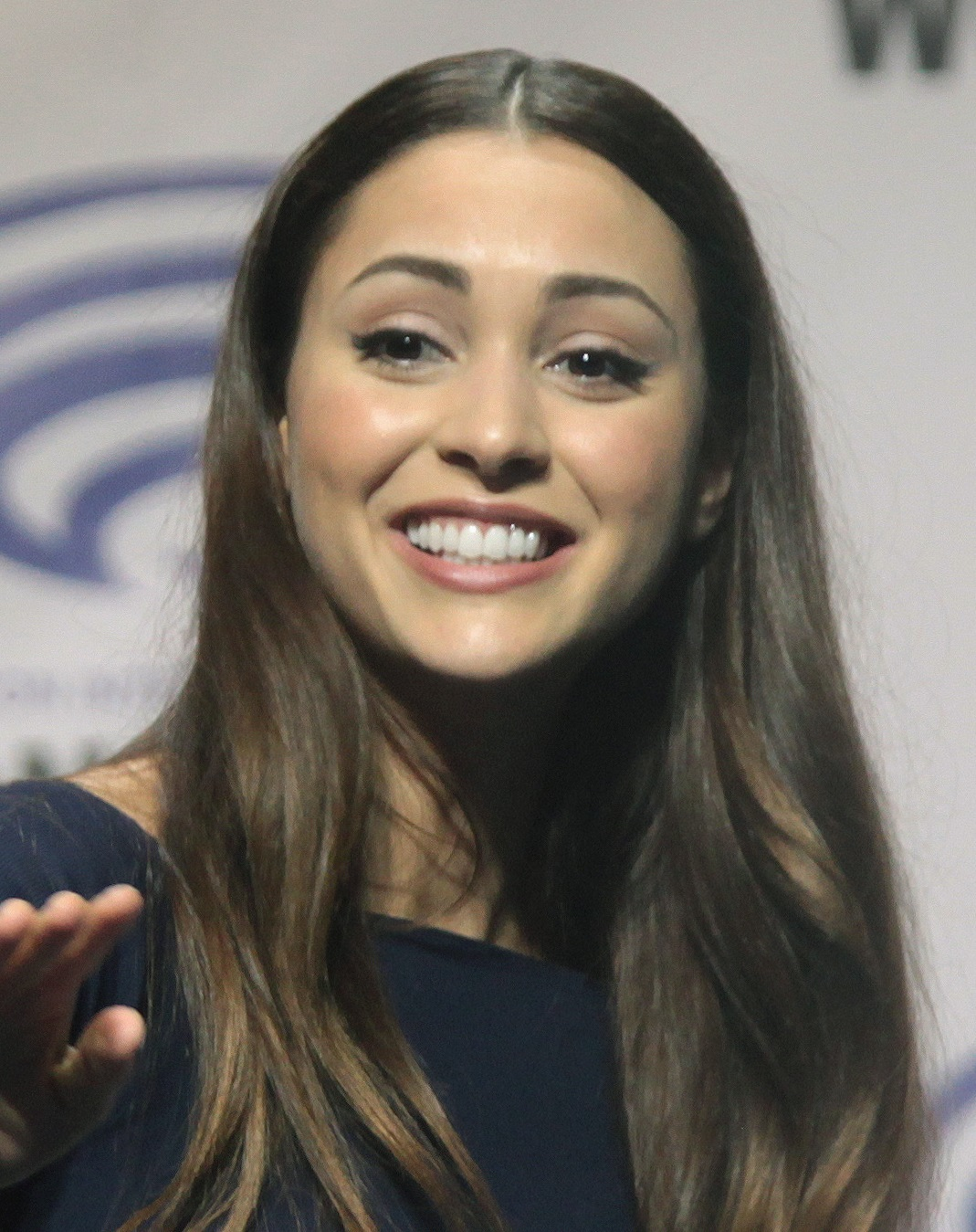
Lindsey Morgan portrays the role of Raven.

Portrayed by Lindsey Morgan, Raven Reyes (seasons 2–7; recurring season 1) is an ambitious zero-gravity mechanic when on board the Ark who is not afraid of anyone or anything. She later collaborates with Abby Griffin in her escape from the Ark and launches herself in a pod to Earth, and occasionally advises Abby in the fields of electronics and mechanical engineering after she becomes chancellor on Earth. Brave and intelligent, Raven leads the camp in setting up communications and making bombs. She was childhood friends with Finn and was in a relationship with him until he fell in love with Clarke. It is revealed in the second season, that Finn took the blame for Raven's crime because she was already 18 and would be floated. She was the first zero G mech student under the age of 18 in 52 years. While she was originally rejected for medical reasons, leading to her illegal spacewalk, Jacapo Sinclair overrode the decision due to Raven's talent.

In the third season, with Abby's help, Raven begins recovering from the injuries she sustained from last season. She joins Jaha's cause after reluctantly taking a tablet given to her by him, she does begin to fight the side effects after Jasper reminds her about Finn. She is soon saved by Clarke and freed of A.L.I.E.'s control using an EMP device that Raven herself had designed and that Sinclair had finished for her. Retaining the intelligence she gained from the AI, Raven helps discover her weakness and aids Clarke in destroying her.

In the fourth season, she bonds with Luna for her loss and convinces her to help save everyone on Earth, she also forgives Murphy for shooting her in the spine. It is revealed that due to retaining a remnant of A.L.I.E.'s code, she is able to use 90% of her brain but developed a negative side effect that could cause her to have a stroke, possibly leading to her death. As she works on a way to recreate Nightblood, Raven experiences a series of hallucinations, including Becca who tempts her with the chance to spacewalk before she dies of her deteriorating condition. However, a hallucination of Sinclair helps Raven to come up with a way to purge the code and save her own life. By freezing herself to death, thus preserving brain function and remaining flatlined for fifteen minutes, Raven is able to "reboot" her brain, purging the code and restoring herself to normal. Afterwards, Clarke rescues her and requests she fly them to the Ark to escape the second Apocalypse which she agrees to do, and successfully able to fly them to space and finally was able to spacewalk again.

In the fifth season, Raven becomes an improved fighter being able to topple Echo in combat and plans to return to Earth. She soon notices another ship landing on Earth, and proceeds to follow it. She realizes that there are other life forms in cryostasis on the Eligius IV prison ship and decides to stay behind and lies about an escape pod so that Bellamy will not argue with her when she stays behind on Eligius IV. After returning to Earth, she forms a romantic relationship with the Eligius pilot Miles Shaw. Throughout the season, Raven is employed as a pilot by both her friends and the Eligius prisoners with their clashing priorities putting Raven and her friends at odds with Clarke. At the end of the season, as the one inhabitable valley left is destroyed, Raven and Shaw fly the survivors back to Eligius IV.

In the sixth season, Raven loses Shaw soon after landing on the new world, Sanctum, and becomes bitter and angry towards Clarke and Abby for their various decisions. When the Lee family from Sanctum seizes control of Eligius IV, Raven awakens Charmaine Diyoza from cryosleep and retakes the ship with her and Madi's help, leading to the deaths of all but one of the hijackers. Raven is left as the sole pilot of both the Earth group and Sanctum following the deaths of the Lee family, the one survivor, Kaylee Lee, later being murdered on Sanctum by Josephine Lightbourne. After Josephine, posing as Clarke whose body she has taken over, makes a deal with Abby to save Marcus Kane using the Mind Drive technology, Raven flies Abby and a group from Sanctum back to the mothership. However, she is horrified to learn that a young man will be sacrificed to resurrect Kane. Raven reluctantly helps Abby, not wanting Abby's death on her conscience from an ill-advised spacewalk of her own, but awakens Indra to help with the situation. Kane eventually decides to float himself and the new Nightblood, sacrificing himself to stop other people from being sacrificed. Upon returning to Sanctum, Raven is imprisoned and nearly burned at the stake before Murphy talks Russell Lightbourne out of it. Raven makes amends with Abby shortly before Abby's death to resurrect Simone Lightbourne and works to save Madi from the Dark Commander possessing her through the Flame. Raven is eventually forced to destroy the Flame to save Madi while Clarke manages to retake control of the ship after killing all of the Primes except for Russell.

In the seventh season, Raven works to help keep the peace between the various factions on Sanctum, partially by helping to guide Murphy and Emori in their assumed roles as Daniel and Kaylee Prime. When Sanctum's nuclear reactor begins to meltdown, Raven is forced to enlist the help of four of the Eligius prisoners to fix the cooling system while Murphy and Emori, protected by their own Nightblood, fix the reactor core. Having originally lied to the prisoners about the severity of the danger that they are in, Raven is forced to lie to them again when the radiation exposure proves to be more extreme than she anticipated which causes it to be fatal to the prisoners. Unwilling to trust the prisoners to do the right thing in the face of death, Raven forces Murphy to help them with the last of the repairs, unaware that one had already figured it out but was continuing anyway to protect his loved ones. With Murphy's help, the prisoners fix the cooling system at the last possible second, but all perish aside from the Nightblood-protected Murphy and Emori, leaving Raven devastated and haunted by the deaths that she had caused. Raven later teams up with Jordan Green to examine the armor of a dead Disciple, figuring out how to use it and learning that the mysterious Anomaly is in fact a wormhole. With her friends in danger, Raven uses the armor to rescue them, but is further haunted by having to kill eight people to do it so soon after the deaths she caused in fixing the reactor. With the armor's help, Raven leads her friends on a rescue mission for Bellamy, Octavia, Echo and Hope, but accidentally directs them to the wrong planet, an icy world called Nakara with no sign of any way to reopen the Anomaly back. Using her armor, Raven leads the group to the Anomaly Stone and determines the code for the right planet, but Raven admits to Clarke that she feels like her soul is cracked with all of the deaths that she has caused. Raven successfully leads the group to Bardo where they learn of Bellamy's apparent death and meet Bill Cadogan while trying to save their remaining friends.

In the series finale, it is Raven who takes the test that determines humanity's future, ultimately convincing the Judge that the human race is worthy of Transcendence. Though Raven Transcends as well, she joins Clarke's friends in choosing to return to human form to live out their lives on Earth.

=== Lincoln ===
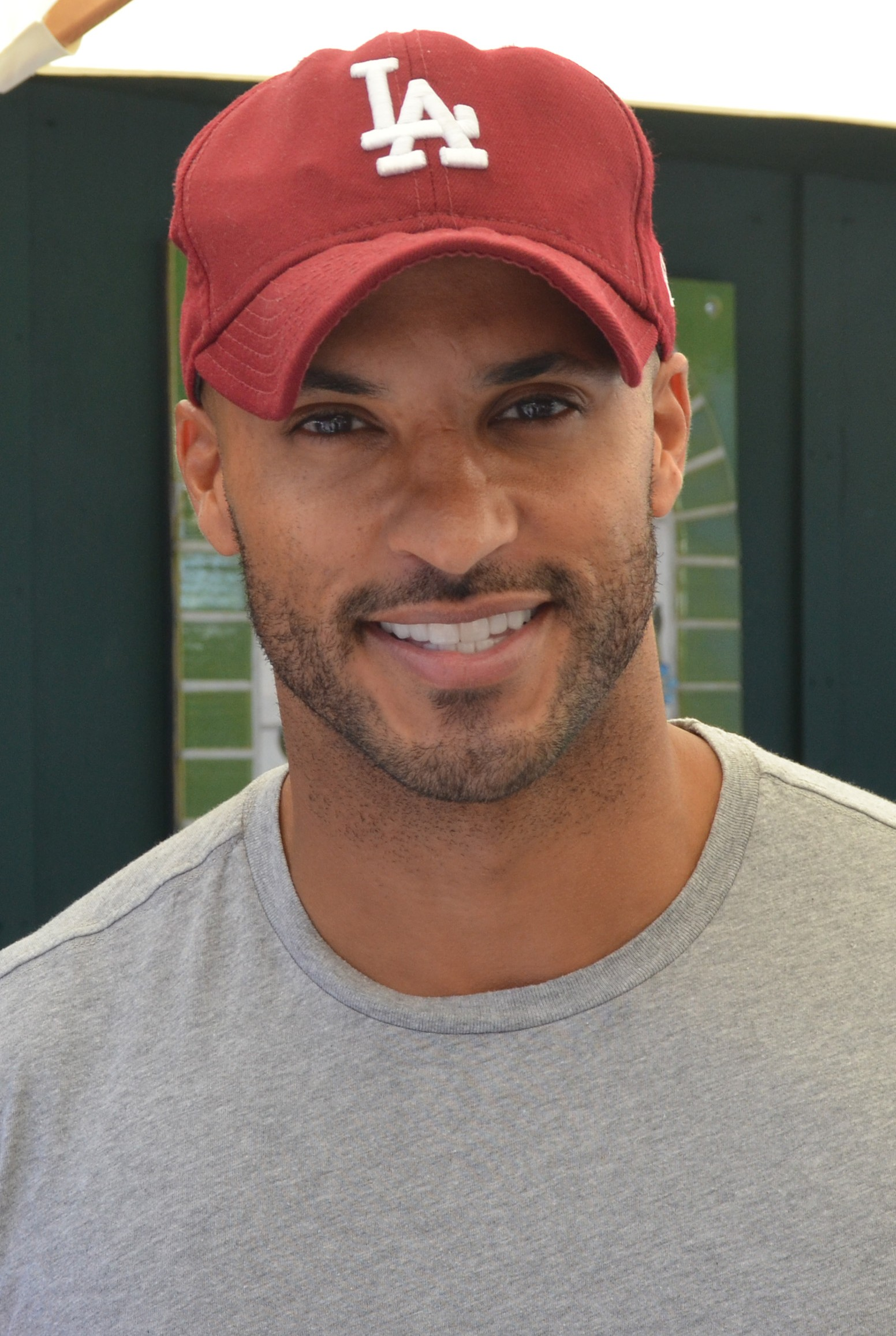
Ricky Whittle portrays the role of Lincoln.

Portrayed by Ricky Whittle, Lincoln (seasons 2–3; recurring season 1) is a Grounder who rescues Octavia. The pair develop a romantic relationship, and Lincoln helps the 100 multiple times, causing him to be viewed as a traitor to his people. He later is drugged to become a reaper, but with Clarke's and Abby's assistance, he is successfully rehabilitated from the drug. During the final battle with Mount Weather, Lincoln catches up to and kills the escaping Cage Wallace. Having been viewed as a traitor by some of his people, Lincoln resides in Camp Jaha with Octavia. He is put in prison by Pike with the help of Bellamy and shot by Pike after surrendering to save his fellow Grounders from execution. His body is subsequently recovered and burned alongside that of Jacapo Sinclair.

=== John Murphy ===
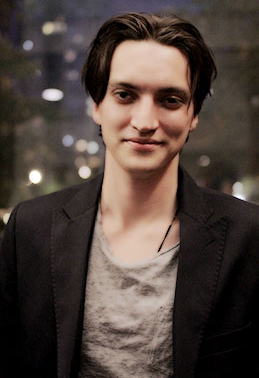
Richard Harmon portrays the role of Murphy.

Portrayed by Richard Harmon, John Murphy (seasons 3–7; recurring seasons 1–2) starts out as one of Bellamy's men and is generally disliked by the group due to his reputation of being a troublemaker and career criminal, making him one of the few members to actually have committed felonies and not petty misdemeanors. After being wrongfully accused by Clarke and nearly lynched, he tries to kill Charlotte. As a result of her suicide, he is banished from the camp. He later returns, surviving being tortured by the Grounders. He seems to have forgiven the 100, but he kills two and attempts to hang Bellamy and accidentally shoots Raven in the spine.

In the second season, he is rescued by Raven from a surrounding Grounder and expresses remorse for his actions. Murphy explains to Raven that his father was executed for stealing medical supplies to help Murphy when he got sick and his mother became an alcoholic who drank herself to death after blaming Murphy for her husband's death. Murphy helps the 100 as they search for their lost members, even saving Bellamy's life when he could have let him drop. As he is still disliked in Camp Jaha, he accompanies Jaha to find the City of Light. On the way, he befriends a Grounder named Emori who later betrays and robs the group. He eventually finds a lighthouse where he is trapped by Jaha and A.L.I.E. after watching a video that shows that A.L.I.E. caused the nuclear holocaust.

In the third season, he leaves the island after not wanting to be a part of Jaha's insane missions, and gets a boat ride from Emori. After Emori transports him and Jaha across the sea, he refuses to take the key and flees with Emori. They start robbing people in the Commander's Forrest and he is eventually captured by Grounder warriors and brought to Polis, as one of the captors discovers a chip in his pocket which has the "Sacred Symbol of the Commander". He is tortured for information by Titus and eventually tells him what he knows. After seeing an escape pod marked Polaris with the a and r burned off as well as drawings, Murphy pieces together the story of the First Commander Becca and her connection to The Ark. Later on, Titus tries to murder Clarke and frame Murphy but accidentally shoots and kills Lexa. After she dies he witnesses Titus remove the chip. After Titus gives Clarke the chip and commits suicide, Ontari makes him the new "Flamekeeper" since he is the only other person to have witnessed it being removed from another person. Ontari takes a liking to him and wants him to sleep with her; if he refuses, she will kill him. He later reunites with Emori who is under A.L.I.E.'s control, and A.L.I.E. implies to her that Ontari's had sex with him. During the final battle with A.L.I.E., Murphy plays a vital part by manually pumping the brain-dead Ontari's heart to keep a blood transfusion to Clarke going so that she can use the Flame to destroy A.L.I.E.

In the fourth season, after the City of Light is destroyed and A.L.I.E.'s control over everyone dissolves, Murphy stays behind with Emori. When he finds out there's a nuclear disaster coming which will wipe out everyone on Earth, he and Emori decide to side with Clarke, who has a plan that might save 100 people. Murphy ends up helping Raven with another plan, and he is confronted with what he is put her through after he shot her. When Raven opts to stay behind, he has a rare emotional moment and shares a tearful goodbye with her. Murphy later retreats to the remnants of the Ark in space with Bellamy, Raven, Emori and Echo to survive the coming nuclear apocalypse.

In the fifth season, six years after Praimfaya, he breaks up with Emori and suffers from an inferiority complex. As they land on the Eligius ship before Bellamy and the others land on Earth, he decides to stay on the ship to protect Raven only for her to berate him by telling him she lied about the escape pod, much to his dismay. Murphy eventually returns to the ground where his skill in manipulation proves vital in causing a mass riot between the prisoners, though Murphy elects to stay behind as the others flee in order to help Kane rescue Abby. In the final battle, Murphy is badly wounded and elects to remain behind until Emori refuses to leave him as she loves Murphy too much to lose him. Unwilling to let Emori lose him, Murphy allows Monty to carry him to safety shortly before the last inhabitable valley on Earth is destroyed. Murphy recovers from his injuries under Abby's care and goes into cryosleep with everyone except for Monty and Harper for the next 125 years.

In the sixth season, Murphy allies himself with the Primes on Sanctum after being offered immortality for himself and Emori despite the Primes killing Clarke to become Josephine Lightbourne's new host. Murphy finds himself torn between his friends and immortality, particularly due to his fears of what awaits him after death. Murphy eventually proposes marriage to Emori who accepts. Though Murphy gains the chance to become a Prime and immortal, he turns his back on the Primes after losing both Abby and Clarke in favor of saving his people with Emori. Clarke, who survived and had been posing as Josephine, admits that she is proud of him, causing Murphy to realize that his friend is still alive. Murphy and Emori manage to rescue their friends and Murphy aids Gabriel Santiago in subduing the Sanctum citizens who have been driven insane by the Red Sun toxin, helping to prevent the massacre of innocent people as Murphy is the only one who can help Gabriel infiltrate their ranks in his guise as Daniel Lee. During this time, Murphy meets Zev, the male lover of Daniel. Murphy's reaction to Zev suggests that Murphy may not be strictly heterosexual, though this is unconfirmed.

In the seventh season, Murphy struggles with guilt over his role in Abby's death and remorse for his actions. Murphy reluctantly assumes the role of Daniel alongside Emori as Kaylee in order to help keep the peace between all of the volatile factions inhabiting Sanctum. After Sanctum's nuclear reactor begins to meltdown, Raven enlists the help of Murphy and Emori, who had both become Nightbloods in preparation for becoming Primes, to help her and four Eligius prisoners fix the problem. With their Nightblood, Murphy and Emori are able to fix the reactor core, though both suffer negative effects from the radiation. After the prisoners suffer a fatal dose of radiation, Raven, not willing to trust them to do the right thing when faced with certain death, lies to them and tricks Murphy into helping, relying on his sense of self-preservation. Murphy bonds with the prisoner Hatch who has already deduced the truth but like Murphy, is trying to protect someone he loves. Together, Murphy and Hatch manage to fix the reactor at the last possible second, though Hatch dies in the process. Murphy and Emori both survive due to their Nightblood, though it takes Emori longer to recover than it does Murphy. With the Faithful threatening self-immolation, Indra enlists the help of a reluctant Murphy to pose as Daniel again and talk them down. Upon seeing the Faithful about to sacrifice children, Murphy risks his own life to rescue the children, but in the process reveals his deception to Daniel's lover Zev. Nearly burned alive, Murphy is rescued when Emori and Indra bring in Russell to talk down the Faithful, with Russell reaffirming Murphy and Emori's covers. However, Indra realizes in the process that Russell's body has in fact been taken over by Sheidheda, the Dark Commander. Murphy and Emori's deception is subsequently revealed by Nikki and Nelson, the leader of the Children of Gabriel, before Sheidheda slaughters many of the Faithful. In the aftermath of the massacre, with the Dark Commander consolidating his power and Indra deposed, Murphy takes leadership of the massacre survivors to hide and oppose Sheidheda's reign with Murphy showing an understanding of the way the Dark Commander operates and something of an ability to predict what he is up to. In turn, Sheidheda appears to genuinely like and respect Murphy despite being on opposing sides, the two treating their conflict like a game of chess and at one point, playing chess together to pass the time when their conflict is at a stalemate before Clarke's return. After discovering that Earth has regenerated, Murphy expresses a desire to relocate everyone on Sanctum to humanity's much-safer homeworld.

In the series finale, after Emori dies, Murphy decides to place her Mind Drive into his own head despite knowing that it will inevitably be fatal to him as he would rather spend his last few hours with Emori than the rest of his life without her. When the human race Transcends, Murphy and Emori join them, but decide to join the rest of Clarke's friends in returning to human form to live out the rest of their lives on Earth.

=== Roan ===
Portrayed by Zach McGowan, Roan (season 4; recurring season 3; guest season 7) is an Ice Nation fugitive who is tempted by Lexa to kidnap Clarke. He turns out to be Prince Roan, son of Queen Nia. He later becomes king of the Ice Nation after Lexa kills Nia for attempting to overthrow her. He supports Ontari as the new Commander and attempts to track down Clarke who has escaped with the Flame. Roan and Clarke instead form an alliance to give Ontari the Flame to help shut down A.L.I.E. but the plan fails and Roan is shot by Kane. He is rescued when Clarke and Abby take the bullet out of his chest. Echo tries to tempt him to kill Clarke for her crimes as well as secure his position as ruler of the 13 clans. However, Clarke gives him A.L.I.E. 2.0 in hopes that he will let her and her people live to save the planet from the nuclear explosion in 6 months which he accepts. Later, he learns that Skaikru seems to be protecting themselves thus ending the alliance. Clarke convinces Roan to share Arkadia until it explodes. He takes part in the challenge where each tribe sends a champion to fight for the position of the leader – who gets to decide which tribe survives in the bunker. He banishes Echo for trying to cheat in the tournament, and declines to fight Octavia, whom he respects. In the end he is killed by the Nightblood Luna, who drowns him.

In season 7's "From the Ashes", Roan reappears to Echo along with the real Echo as a hallucination due to Red Sun toxin. The two accuse Echo of being a killer and press her on who Echo is now, reminding Echo of her many mistakes.

=== Echo ===
Portrayed by Tasya Teles, Echo (seasons 5–7; guest seasons 2–3; recurring season 4) is a former Ice Nation Grounder who was trapped at Mount Weather. She saves Bellamy's life, which leads him to trust her and he helps her escape. She later betrays him and helps act out a plan that led to the destruction of Mount Weather. After the events in the City of Light she blames Skaikru for all the casualties and demands for Clarke's execution. She becomes a royal guard and the bodyguard of Roan, but is banished for her interference in the Grounder battle. She assists Octavia in trying to open the bunker, but Octavia will only help Azgeda and not her. She fights off Grounders who tried to kill Clarke and provides protection onward in exchange for her safety when the death wave hits. In the season finale, Bellamy talks Echo out of suicide and she joins Bellamy's group in retreating to the remains of the Ark in space. In the fifth season, six years later, she is romantically involved with Bellamy, and afraid to return to Earth, knowing that Octavia will want her dead. Once she returns to Earth, she is confronted by Octavia who reminds her of her banishment but gives her an ultimatum on spying on the people of Eligius IV in exchange for banishment being lifted, and Octavia executes several of her people in order to make her defection seem legitimate.

In season six's "Ashes to Ashes", it's revealed that the real Echo is long dead. The current Echo is her best friend Ash who was forced to kill Echo as a child and take her place by Queen Nia of the Ice Nation. In the same episode, Echo becomes a Nightblood after being injected with Madi's bone marrow, narrowly escaping being mind-wiped with the help of Gaia and Nathan Miller. Echo helps to build a rebellion against the Primes and joins her friends in trying to do better by saving as many people as they can from a psychosis-induced massacre created by the Primes releasing a toxin into the population. The group eventually succeeds, but in the aftermath, Octavia is stabbed by Hope Diyoza and vanishes into the mysterious Anomaly.

In the seventh season, Echo works with Hope and Gabriel Santiago to rescue Octavia and Bellamy who has been kidnapped by the mysterious Disciples. Following the Disciples through the Anomaly, in reality a wormhole, to the planet Skyring, the group becomes trapped when the message containing the code they need to continue on to Bardo is washed away. Due to the time dilation from a nearby black hole, time passes much faster on Skyring than on Sanctum, causing their friends to be initially unaware of how long they have been gone and the danger they are in. Echo, Hope and Gabriel are eventually forced to wait for five years on Sanctum for the Disciples to return for their prisoner Orlando in order to get a chance to reach Bardo. Orlando eventually agrees to train the group as Disciples to help in their rescue mission, but when the time comes to leave, Echo decides that they can't trust Orlando to help them on Bardo and abandons him on Skyring after killing all of the Disciples that they have subdued. As later revealed by Captain Meredith, Echo's betrayal caused Orlando to subsequently commit suicide. On Bardo, the three manage to rescue Octavia from the Disciples' memory capture machine, only to learn that Bellamy had been apparently killed a week before trying to rescue his sister himself. Grief-stricken and enraged, Echo brutally kills their hostage, ruining the plan to use him to help rescue Charmaine Diyoza. Echo later tries to commit genocide on the Disciples in revenge, but is stopped by her friends. Though Echo is reunited with Bellamy who had in fact survived, Bellamy has been changed for the worse by his experiences. After Clarke kills Bellamy, Echo tells Clarke that she feels the real Bellamy has been dead for awhile and sinks into a depression over his loss and her unwillingness to reveal the truth about her identity to him.

In the series finale, Echo is mortally wounded risking her life to help Octavia. When humanity achieves Transcendence, as Hope has been keeping Echo alive with CPR after her heart stops, she is able to join them. Along with the rest of Clarke's surviving friends, Echo chooses to return to human form to live out the rest of her life on Earth rather than remain Transcended.

=== Jordan Green ===
Portrayed by Shannon Kook, Jordan Green (seasons 6–7; guest season 5) is the son of Monty Green and Harper McIntyre. During his time on Sanctum, Jordan builds a relationship with Nightblood Delilah Workman who becomes the host to Prime Priya Desai, resulting in Delilah's mind being completely wiped. Due to his love for Priya's host, Jordan shows a great deal of care for Priya who has no memory of him, saving her life when Madi, under the influence of the Dark Commander, begins murdering Primes. Jordan is severely wounded in the process, but survives and Priya sees to his recovery personally. After learning that Clarke survived the mind wipe to become Josephine Lightbourne's host, Jordan expresses hope that Delilah survived as well and becomes angry when his friends refuse to even try to save Delilah, unaware that Clarke had only survived due to her experiences with A.L.I.E. During the revolution on Sanctum, the Adjustors attempt to brainwash Jordan who is rescued by his friends partway through the process but is left in an unresponsive trance until the next morning. In the aftermath of the revolution, which left all of the Primes aside from Russell Lightbourne dead, Jordan chooses to remain on Sanctum to help clean up the mess, pointing out that while Sanctum wasn't perfect before they got there, it worked. Jordan is shown to have kept one of the Prime's Mind Drives, presumably that of Priya who was killed by Delilah's vengeful mother.

In season 7, Jordan attempts to act as an intermediary with the Adjustors and Russell. Despite undergoing the brainwashing, Jordan states that he doesn't believe in the divinity of the Primes and instead shows sympathy for Russell who he feels is simply a man who has lost his way. Though Jordan returns Priya's Mind Drive to Russell, the depressed and suicidal man destroys it instead. Jordan and Russell have a conversation about the mysterious Anomaly which Jordan finds himself drawn to due to the experiences he had under the influence of the Red Sun toxin. Having also been drawn to the Anomaly, Russell suggests that it is now Jordan's job to try to figure the mystery out. Jordan is eventually rejected by Russell's followers who dub themselves the Faithful while Sheidheda, who has killed Russell and taken over his body, manipulates Jordan as part of his own plans. Jordan teams up with Raven to examine the armor of a dead Disciple, having not seen her since they worked together briefly after Eligius IV arrived at Sanctum. Upon learning that the Anomaly is a wormhole and that Clarke is in trouble, Raven and Jordan rush to their friends' rescue with Raven using the armor to kill eight Disciples, something that leaves her disturbed. Having learned that their friends are trapped on another planet, Jordan joins Clarke, Raven, Miller and Niylah in traveling through the Anomaly in search of them. Eventually reaching the Disciple homeworld of Bardo, Jordan is shown the logs of the native Bardoans by Bill Cadogan, logs that the Disciples believe speak of a last war and then transcendence after entering "the final code" into the Anomaly Stone. Based on his knowledge of the Korean language from Monty, Jordan comes to the conclusion that the Disciples mistranslated the logs. Instead of a last war, Jordan's translation of the logs suggest a test undertaken by whoever enters the code, that individual representing their species to determine that species' future. He grows close to Hope Diyoza with the two starting to form a romantic relationship with each other.

=== Russell Lightbourne ===
Portrayed by JR Bourne (season 7; recurring season 6) and Sean Maguire, Russell Lightbourne is the leader of Sanctum. Originally a colonist from Earth and an astronomer, Russell fell under the influence of the first Red Sun Eclipse and slaughtered many of the other Eligus colonists, including his own daughter Josephine, in a psychotic state. Russell subsequently spent the next twenty-five years working with Josephine's boyfriend Gabriel Santiago to find a way to resurrect those that they lost, eventually succeeding through Mind Drives and Nightblood hosts and gaining a form of immortality. The original colonists became known as the Primes and ruled over the citizens of Sanctum, sacrificing innocent people in order to extend their own lives. However, due to moral concerns, Gabriel eventually abandoned the Primes to form the militant group known as the Children of Gabriel.

When the survivors from Earth arrived, Russell and the other Primes were initially welcoming, but this changed after Russell and his wife Simone learned that Clarke Griffin was a Nightblood. Desperate to resurrect Josephine and unwilling to wait potentially 56 years for their chance, the two mind wiped Clarke, apparently killing her and kept the secret of Josephine's return. The two enticed Abigail Griffin to help them make more Nightblood to make new hosts to deal with the dwindling population of Nightbloods despite having murdered her daughter by promising to help her save Marcus Kane. Unlike his wife, Russell initially showed remorse and hesitation over some of their actions, being visibly anguished while killing Clarke and genuinely remorseful when apologizing to Bellamy Blake while trying to make a deal with him. Russell was elated to learn that Clarke had survived, seeing the new Nightblood as a solution that would allow him to bring Josephine back in a willing host while restoring Clarke. However, under the influence of the Dark Commander, Clarke's adopted daughter Madi began slaughtering Primes and Josephine was unwilling to give up Clarke's body, instead desiring to get rid of Clarke for good and keep her body. This led to conflict between the Primes and Earth survivors with Clarke's friends seeking out Gabriel to help free her from Josephine's control, though Bellamy intended to trade Josephine's Mind Drive to Russell for peace. After Clarke's friends began fostering rebellion, leading to Simone's death, Russell abandoned all restraint and nearly burned them at the stake before John Murphy offered a way to restore the Primes using bone marrow transplants to recreate Nightblood. Russell sacrificed Abby to be the new host for Simone and unleashed Red Sun toxin to turn Sanctum's citizens on each other while the Primes fled the planet. Having killed Josephine and been posing as her, Clarke thwarted the Primes' plan to mind wipe Wonkru and blew all of the Primes except for Russell into deep space while her friends managed to stop the fighting on Sanctum. Russell allied himself with the Dark Commander to get revenge upon Clarke, but Madi regained control and had Russell arrested for his crimes.

In "From the Ashes", a depressed and suicidal Russell has refused to eat, drink or sleep since his arrest while the various factions of Sanctum clamor for either his release or execution. Apparently disillusioned with his former image of a living divinity, Russell destroyed Priya's Mind Drive before discussing with Jordan Green the mysterious Anomaly that they were both drawn to. When Clarke sought his help to calm the factions, Russell purposefully goaded Clarke with her mother's memory in an attempt to get Clarke to kill him. Though nearly successful, Clarke knocked Russell unconscious instead. Russell awakened in a Mindspace in his original form where he was greeted by Sheidheda, the Dark Commander who had downloaded himself into Russell's Mind Drive when the Flame was deleted. The Dark Commander slit Russell's throat, killing him and destroying Russell's consciousness. With Russell gone, Sheidheda resurrected himself in Russell's body and began pretending to be the deposed Prime. Jason Rothenberg confirmed that Russell will stay dead and will not return to battle Sheidheda for control of his body as happened with Clarke and Josephine. Though Sheidheda initially is successful in posing as Russell, Indra realizes the truth in "Welcome to Bardo" and has Russell's Mind Drive removed from his body so that Sheidheda can never be resurrected again. Eventually, as he consolidated his power, Sheidheda revealed the truth to everyone that Russell was in fact dead and that it was now Sheidheda that controlled his host body. In the series finale, Indra kills Sheidheda by blowing up Russell's host body with a sonic cannon. With Russell's Mind Drive removed and the Flame destroyed, the Dark Commander's consciousness perishes with Russell's body, making his demise permanent.

=== Sheidheda ===
Portrayed by Dakota Daulby and JR Bourne, Sheidheda (season 7; recurring season 6), also known as the Dark Commander, is a former Commander and leader of the Grounders. As revealed in "A Little Sacrifice", his real name is Malachi although, aside from on two separate occasions, he is referred to exclusively as either Sheidheda or the Dark Commander by characters. Unlike most of the other Commanders, Sheidheda is pure evil, killing his first three Flamekeepers, anyone who wouldn't bow to him and their entire families. As a child, Indra once saw the Dark Commander in action on Trikru land. Indra's father died in the battle while her mother bowed to Sheidheda with it later being suggested that she did so in exchange for him sparing her daughter's life. Eventually, the Dark Commander is killed by his fourth Flamekeeper. Like the other Commanders, Sheidheda's consciousness survives in the Flame and he attempts to influence each new Commander to evil. However, the Commanders and their Flamekeepers have a Separation Ritual which calls upon the Spirits of the Commanders to seal Sheidheda away from each new Commander.

In the sixth season, new Commander Madi Griffin begins to see Sheidheda after arriving upon Sanctum. Initially able to resist the Dark Commander's influence, Madi eventually begins to see him in the waking world. Concerned, her Flamekeeper Gaia has Madi attempt the Separation Ritual, but it ultimately fails. After receiving word that her adopted mother Clarke Griffin had been killed in order to resurrect Josephine Lightbourne, Madi banishes Gaia and agrees to follow the Dark Commander to get revenge against the Primes. Under his influence, Madi begins assassinating Primes, killing Miranda Mason and nearly killing Priya Desai had Jordan Green not intervened. Due to Madi's actions and Bellamy kidnapping Josephine after learning that Clarke was still alive and trapped inside of her own body, relations between the Primes and the Earth people fall apart and they are imprisoned. Raven Reyes realizes that the Dark Commander had somehow managed to trick the Flame's AI into protecting him and isolating the other Commanders. Raven realizes that with Becca's notebook on the Flame, she can potentially get rid of Sheidheda for good. The Dark Commander is able to take full possession of Madi, particularly after Clarke returns posing as Josephine and claiming that Clarke was gone for good. With Madi's friends attempting to get rid of him, Sheidheda threatens to kill Madi if they tried to remove him from the Flame. When Raven attempts to get rid of him anyway, she discovers that the Dark Commander had added a kill code to the Flame that would get rid of him at the cost of destroying the Flame and the spirits of the other Commanders. After Clarke kills all of the other Primes, Sheidheda forges an alliance with Russell Lightbourne to get revenge, using Madi's control over Wonkru. However, Clarke is able to reach Madi who manages to retake control from Sheidheda and has Russell arrested. Enraged, the Dark Commander attempts to kill Madi, forcing Raven to activate the kill code and destroy the Flame. However, Sheidheda had anticipated this and manipulated the situation so that at least he and possibly the other Commanders are uploaded to another location.

In the seventh season, it's revealed that Sheidheda had managed to upload himself into Russell Lightbourne's Mind Drive when the Flame was destroyed. After Clarke knocks Russell unconscious, Sheidheda greets him in a Mindspace resembling the location where he would meet with Madi. The Dark Commander slits the deposed Prime's throat, killing him and destroying Russell's consciousness. With Russell gone, Sheidheda is resurrected in the body of Russell's final host and preys on Clarke's emotions to get her to save him from a fire. As the Dark Commander revels in his resurrection, Clarke announces that "Russell" will be executed for his crimes the next day. Manipulating Russell's followers, Sheidheda is able to force an end to the execution or risk creating a martyr for the fanatics. After Sheidheda stops the fanatics, now calling themselves the Faithful, from executing Murphy, Indra realizes who he really is from his behavior. Indra promises to kill Sheidheda herself when the time comes and has Russell's Mind Drive painfully removed by Eric Jackson so that the Dark Commander can not be resurrected again when he dies. Sheidheda's resurrection is later revealed after he brutally slaughters most of the Faithful and Knight and two other Wonkru guards bow before the resurrected Dark Commander. Escaping the scene, the Dark Commander begins solidifying his power over Wonkru, beating Indra in single combat and forcing her to kneel for Madi's sake. However, Madi manages to slash out his right eye with a knife while Murphy and Emori lead the surviving Sanctummites into hiding to prepare to fight back against the Dark Commander's reign. Sheidheda brings the prisoners under his control and massacres the Children of Gabriel for refusing to kneel, but continues to be opposed by Murphy who he takes prisoner while Emori forces a stalemate by threatening to detonate Sanctum's nuclear reactor if Murphy is harmed or if Sheidheda attacks. Shortly thereafter, Clarke returns with the Disciples in search of the Flame. The Dark Commander is severely wounded, but aids Indra in escaping their common enemy; in return, Indra chooses not to kill him but instead to leave Sheidheda to die of his wounds. However, in exchange for the Disciples helping him, the Dark Commander directs them to the sketchbook containing proof that Madi still has the memories of the Commanders. Sheidheda's wound is treated by the Disciples and he forges an alliance with Bill Cadogan to capture Madi, though secretly the Dark Commander opposes Cadogan's aims as he only wishes to rule and not Transcend. Sheidheda's attack leaves Gabriel Santiago mortally wounded, but the Dark Commander is defeated in combat by Indra and Gaia and forced to flee empty-handed in order to survive. Locked up upon his return to Bardo, Sheidheda is released by Clarke and Octavia and agrees to act as a distraction for them, but disappears after slaughtering several Disciples.

In "The Last War," Sheidheda attempts to cause a war between Wonkru and the Disciples during the test to determine if humanity deserves Transcendence or not, mortally wounding Levitt and Echo in the process. As the Dark Commander prepares to lead a charge on the Disciples' position, Indra confronts him with one of the Eligius sonic cannons. Declaring it to be for her mother, Indra blows Sheidheda up with the cannon, killing him. With his Mind Drive removed and the Flame destroyed, the Dark Commander's consciousness is left with nowhere to go and dies with Russell's host body, rendering his death permanent. Sheidheda's death allows Octavia to talk both Wonkru and the Disciples down from war.

=== Gabriel Santiago ===
Portrayed primarily by Chuku Modu (season 7; recurring season 6), Gabriel Santiago was a geneticist and one of the original Eligius colonists on Sanctum and the boyfriend of Josephine Lightbourne. During the first Red Sun Eclipse, Russell Lightbourne fell into a psychotic state and killed many of the other original colonists, including Josephine. Gabriel himself survived and dedicated the next twenty-five years of his life to finding a way to bring back those they lost, particularly Josephine. Gabriel eventually discovered a way to resurrect the original colonists by implanting their Mind Drives into mind wiped Nightblood hosts, effectively granting them a form of immortality. The first to be successfully resurrected was Josephine herself. Josephine would later state that Gabriel had already been dying of cancer by the time that he succeeded and Josephine brought him back as she was unwilling to lose him either. Thanks to Gabriel, the original colonists became known as the Primes and ruled over Sanctum, using Nightblood hosts to resurrect themselves. However, Gabriel developed moral concerns about their actions, particularly sacrificing innocent people to save themselves and destroyed the Nightblood embryos in an attempt to stop the resurrections, escaping with the help of Ryker Desai. Over the next seventy years, Gabriel formed the militant group known as the Children of Gabriel, rescuing children sacrificed to the forest by Josephine and became known primarily as "The Old Man". Gabriel intended to die with his elderly host, but Eduardo, a loyal follower who was unwilling to let him go, resurrected Gabriel against his wishes in the body of Xavier, a free-born Nightblood amongst the Children of Gabriel. Out of guilt, Gabriel killed Eduardo and lived as Xavier, vanishing to his followers for the next ten years. Despite their differences in ideology, Gabriel never stopped loving Josephine in 236 years, something that Josephine admitted to reciprocating.

When the Earth survivors arrived on Sanctum, they came into conflict with the Children of Gabriel. During this time, Octavia Blake and Charmaine Diyoza met Gabriel as Xavier and he became interested in Octavia's connection to the mysterious Anomaly, something that Gabriel had spent over a century studying. With Octavia dying, Gabriel led the two to the anomaly with Diyoza deducing his true identity. Diyoza and Octavia entered the Anomaly, Diyoza vanishing to her apparent death while Octavia returned fully healed. Gabriel and Octavia attempted to determine the truth of Octavia's time in the Anomaly, instead leading her on a journey of self-reflection. After learning that Clarke Griffin was the host of the once again resurrected Josephine, Gabriel worked with Octavia and Bellamy to save their friend and was reunited with Josephine for the first time in decades. Despite his continuing love for Josephine and vice versa, Gabriel refused to let her sacrifice Clarke's life and attempted to safely remove Josephine's Mind Drive. After Josephine hung on inside of Clarke, Clarke was forced to kill her for good in self-defense to Gabriel's obvious grief. Gabriel's true identity became exposed to his followers and they worked together to stop the resurrection of the remaining Primes though Gabriel's haste foiled the original plan and caused chaos when Russell unleashed the Red Sun toxin upon the people of Sanctum. Gabriel worked with Clarke's friends, particularly John Murphy, to contain the chaos while Russell was arrested on Eligius IV and the other Primes were permanently killed by Clarke aside from Priya and Ryker Desai who died on Sanctum in the rebellion. After the rebellion, Gabriel discovered a tattoo on Octavia's back matching the symbols on the Anomaly Stone, a mysterious artifact connected to the Anomaly that he had been studying for over a century. When Gabriel and Octavia activated the artifact using the symbols, Diyoza's daughter Hope emerged from the Anomaly, stated that "he" had her mother and stabbed Octavia who vanished with the Anomaly.

After the disappearance of Hope and the kidnapping of Bellamy Blake by the mysterious Disciples, Gabriel joined Echo and Hope in traveling through the Anomaly in search of their friends, emerging on another planet named Skyring by Hope where time ran much faster due to time dilation and where Octavia had spent ten years with Diyoza and Hope before being captured by the Disciples. Hope was able to provide Gabriel with some answers about how the Anomaly, in reality a wormhole created by an alien race, worked and revealed that she had only injected Octavia with a locater tag to send Octavia through the Anomaly as per Hope's deal with the leader of the Disciples. On Skyring, Gabriel discovered the body of his friend quantum physicist Doctor Colin Benson and realized that Skyring was actually in fact planet Beta from the Eliguis III colony mission, though the mission had failed due to a transport ship crash that had killed all but Colin himself. Revealed to have kept Josephine's Mind Drive to be sure she was truly gone, Gabriel began using Colin's Memory Drive, the technology that Gabriel had first reverse-engineered the Mind Drive from, to search for the code to open the Anomaly to Bardo where the Disciples came from and which Gabriel suspected was another Eligius III colony world. Though successful in finding the code, Orlando, a man imprisoned on Skyring by the Disciples destroyed Gabriel's computer before they could record the code for their use. The group subsequently works with Orlando to train to become Disciples to infiltrate Bardo and rescue their friends in five years. Gabriel ultimately betrays his friends on Bardo, unwilling to risk going to the surface and apparently becoming a willing member of the Disciple cause. Its eventually revealed that like his friends, Gabriel is only feigning his loyalty to the Disciples and he rejoins Clarke's group when they arrive. After returning to Sanctum, a hallucination of Josephine entices Gabriel to repair the Flame and use it to find the code to begin the last war. Gabriel begins repairing the Flame using Eligius technology, but comes to the conclusion that this is the wrong choice and he destroys the Flame instead.

In "A Sort of Homecoming", Gabriel is stabbed several times while defending Madi from Sheidheda. Wanting to finally die, Gabriel rejects all medical help and peacefully passes away shortly thereafter surrounded by his friends and adopted family.

=== Hope Diyoza ===
Portrayed by Shelby Flannery, Hope Diyoza (season 7; guest season 6) is the daughter of Charmaine Diyoza and Paxton McCreary. Throughout the fifth and sixth seasons, Diyoza is pregnant with Hope and chooses her name with the help of Marcus Kane. In the middle of the sixth season, hallucinations of a young Hope draw Diyoza into the mysterious Anomaly where she vanishes. At the end of the season, Octavia Blake, who followed Diyoza into the Anomaly but returned moments later, is discovered to have a mysterious code tattooed upon her back. When the code is entered, a twenty-year old Hope emerges from the Anomaly, states that "he" has her mother and stabs Octavia who vanishes while Hope collapses.

In the seventh season, a series of flashbacks reveal that Hope was raised by her mother and Octavia on a planet that Hope dubbed Skyring on the other side of the Anomaly which is revealed to be a wormhole linking six different planets together, one of them being Earth. Due to time dilation from a nearby black hole, time passed much faster on Skyring than on Sanctum meaning that in the seconds Octavia and Diyoza were gone, ten years passed on Skyring. However, Diyoza and Octavia were eventually captured by the Disciples, leaving Hope alone for some time. She was later raised by a Disciple named Dev who was sent to the planet as punishment and ten years later, launched a rescue mission for her mother and Octavia, though Dev died in the process. With the help of a compassionate Disciple scientist named Levitt, Hope succeeded in sending Octavia back to Sanctum, but the travel wiped Octavia's memory of her time away. Before Octavia's departure, the three imprinted Hope's biometric code on Octavia's back so that she could later pull Hope through the Anomaly. However, Hope was captured trying to rescue her mother and forced by the Disciple leader Anders to inject Octavia with a locator tag when she was eventually pulled through the Anomaly in exchange for Diyoza's life.

In the present of the seventh season, like Octavia, Hope initially loses her memory, but aids Echo and Gabriel Santiago in working to rescue a kidnapped Bellamy. Returning to Skyring restores Hope's memory, but the note Levitt left for Hope with the code for the Disciple homeworld Bardo is washed away. The group ends up trapped on Skyring for five years, but convince Orlando, a Disciple prisoner trapped there as well, to help them train for a rescue mission when the Disciples return for him. The ambush is successful, but Orlando is abandoned on Skyring where he commits suicide. On Bardo, Hope has to be talked out of an assassination attempt on Anders and they discover that Bellamy was apparently killed in a rescue attempt of his own for Octavia. Hope is reunited with her mother, who managed to escape captivity on her own, but they are betrayed by Gabriel who refuses to try a risky plan to survive. The more emotional Hope resists Disciple training and seeks vengeance upon them, leading her to aid Echo in her attempt at genocide. Though Echo is ultimately talked down, Hope kills Anders and attempts to release the Gem-9 bioweapon herself. However, Diyoza sacrifices herself to stop her daughter from committing genocide. Grief-stricken, Hope is comforted by Jordan Green and the two begin developing a romantic relationship with each other although she further suffers the loss of Gabriel. After humanity achieves Transcendence, Hope chooses to return to human form to live out the rest of her days on Earth with her friends and Jordan.

== Recurring cast ==
=== The Ark/Arkadia/Skaikru ===
- Sachin Sahel as Eric Jackson: Abby's helper and confidant. In the third season, he is taken over by A.L.I.E. He is freed from A.L.I.E.'s control once Clarke defeats her. In the fifth season, he has entered a relationship with Miller. In the sixth season, he is part of the team that goes to Sanctum and reluctantly helps Abby try to save Marcus Kane, worried about her growing obsession with it. Jackson is initially a vital part of the plan to save Clarke from Josephine Lightbourne, but her friends are forced to find another solution. He later helps to save Madi from the Dark Commander. In the seventh season, he is shown to resent and blame Murphy for Abby's death even though Clarke doesn't blame and forgives Murphy. With Abby dead, Jackson acts as Sanctum's doctor and helps Indra painfully remove Sheidheda's Mind Drive so that he can never be resurrected again. In the aftermath of Sheidheda's takeover, Jackson secretly provides Murphy's group with medical supplies as his way of helping. He joins Clarke's returned group in going in search of their friends and is reunited with Miller on a regenerated Earth. Jackson achieves Transcendence along with the rest of the human race, but decides to join the rest of Clarke's friends in returning to human form to live out their lives on Earth.
- Alessandro Juliani as Jacapo Sinclair (seasons 1–4): The Ark's Chief Engineer who was a father figure and mentor to Raven. Its revealed that after Raven was disqualified as a zero-g mechanic for medical reasons, Sinclair overrode the decision due to her talent. One of the few not to fall under A.L.I.E.'s control, he finishes Raven's EMP device to save her life and is the one to figure out how to activate the Flame using his knowledge of Latin. Though he mentions at one point that he has a wife, she presumably dies at some point as Sinclair states to Clarke that Raven is all that he has left. Sinclair is later killed in the third season by Emerson. Usually just referred to by his last name, Sinclair's first name isn't given until A.L.I.E. reveals her knowledge of his death to a confused Jaha, the first hint that Jasper Jordan is now under her control. In the fourth season, Sinclair reappears to a dying Raven as a hallucination. Sinclair prevents Raven from performing a suicidal spacewalk and instead helps her to come up with a way to purge the remnants of A.L.I.E.'s code from Raven's mind and save her life.
- Steve Talley as Kyle Wick (seasons 1–2): An engineer who was a coworker of Raven back on the Ark. They later engage in a relationship. He also became friends with Marcus Kane after he saved him. In the third season, it is mentioned that he and Raven have broken up. He has not appeared since and his ultimate fate is unknown. He presumably died off-screen at some point, possibly during the death wave.
- Chris Browning as Jake Griffin (season 1, 6): Abby's husband and Clarke's father who died prior to the beginning of the series. He was executed for attempting to release critical information regarding the Ark's swiftly deteriorating life-support systems; Clarke initially blamed Wells for telling his father, before learning that her mother was responsible and Wells took responsibility to save her relationship with her mother. Clarke was accused of assisting in his crime. A manifestation of Jake appears in Clarke's mindspace in the sixth season when she is trapped in her own mind by the implantation of Josephine Lightbourne's Mind Drive. In her last moments, Abby remembers her husband alongside Marcus Kane and her daughter.
- Terry Chen as Commander Shumway (season 1): A high-ranking member of the Ark Guard. In the early episodes, he is often seen helping to run operations such as the investigation into the assassination attempt on Chancellor Jaha's life and pushes Kane to use his new power to being immediately reducing the population, something that Kane rebukes him for. In flashbacks to a year prior to the series, Shumway, then just a Lieutenant, is the one to discover Octavia Blake's secret existence. Its later revealed that it was Shumway who floated Bellamy and Octavia's mother for having a second child, though he claims he was just following orders and who hired Bellamy to assassinate Jaha in exchange for getting him a seat on the 100's dropship to Earth to protect his sister. After contact is reestablished with the 100, Shumway attempts to cover up the crime by hiring Dax to assassinate Bellamy in exchange for a seat for his mother on the first dropship to Earth and a choice assignment. The attempt fails thanks to Clarke and Bellamy, driven by his own guilt, offers Jaha a deal where he reveals who hired him to kill the Chancellor in exchange for a pardon. Shumway is arrested, but Diana Sydney who he was working for all along, has Shumway killed in his cell with it framed to look like a suicide before Shumway can be executed or reveal her involvement.
- Kate Vernon as Diana Sydney (season 1): A former Chancellor of the Ark who was behind the assassination attempt on Jaha, having had Shumway recruit Bellamy for the job. After Abby Griffin is stripped of her council seat, it is given to Diana with the help of Cuyler Ridley. She subsequently murders Shumway under the guise of a suicide when his role in her rebellion is exposed. Diana paints herself as a voice of the "lower classes" that would otherwise not be given the chance to return to Earth as the Ark's resources are depleted. However, she shows no regard for the lives of the people who don't follow her, willing to sacrifice everyone else on the Ark to get to Earth. Diana bombs the Unity Day celebration in another effort to assassinate Jaha along with the rest of the Council; though the Council is killed, Jaha survives. In desperation, Diana launches early, condemning the Ark to catastrophic damage in the process and killing approximately 1,500 people. However, her escape is short-lived as the Exodus dropship crashes on Earth, killing all aboard. Its later discovered that the Mountain Men of Mount Weather caused the crash.
- Teach Grant as Cuyler Ridley (season 1): An Ark mechanic whose wife died in the Culling. Ridley vocally expresses his anger over the losses, especially since soon after the Ark learns that the Earth is survivable. Ridley helps Diana Sydney get a seat on the Ark's Council and he later conducts the bombing that kills all of the Council except for Diana and Jaha. Ridley is exposed as the bomber, but manages to escape aboard the Exodus dropship. He is killed when the vessel crashes on Earth.
- Chris Shields as Sergeant David Miller (season 2–4): A sergeant in the Ark Guard and the father of Nathan Miller of the 100. When Bellamy leads a mission to try to rescue the missing 48, David joins Abby in aiding their escape, giving Bellamy a gun and asking Bellamy to look for his son. He later sides with Abby against Jaha when he tries to take control and lead the survivors to the City of Light. During the battle outside of Mount Weather, David is injured trying to set a bomb, but ultimately survives. In the third season, he reports on Indra making contact to speak with them and takes the City of Light chip along with all of the other Arkadia residents, though he is released when Clarke destroys A.L.I.E. In the fourth season, he is one of the people chosen to enter the Second Dawn bunker for safety against the second nuclear apocalypse, but chooses to give up his spot to save his son's life instead. Stranded outside, David is killed either by the rising radiation levels or the death wave while his sacrifice ensures his son's continuing survival.
- Kendall Cross as Major Byrne (season 2): Captain of Marcus Kane's guard at Camp Jaha. She is killed by a mutated species of carnivorous ape.
- Michael Beach as Charles Pike (seasons 3, 6): An Ark survivor from Farm Station. On the Ark he was a teacher, but on Earth he is a leader in the guard and later the chancellor of Arkadia. He is captured and sent to be executed for his crimes against the Grounders. In the season finale, after assisting in defeating A.L.I.E., he is stabbed to death by Octavia to avenge Lincoln's death. In the sixth season, Pike reappears as a manifestation of Octavia's mind after she takes the Red Sun toxin challenging Octavia on who she is now. Octavia, desiring redemption, refuses to kill Pike again and instead saves him from a manifestation of her dark side that she kills instead. In the seventh season, Pike's death is shown in one of Octavia's memories viewed by the Disciple scientist Levitt. Having seen everything leading up to that point, Levitt cheers when he sees the memory of Octavia killing Pike.
- Jonathan Whitesell as Bryan (seasons 3–4): The former boyfriend of Nathan Miller from Farm Station. He is one of the few Skaikru members who did not take A.L.I.E.'s chip to join the City of Light, and survives the battle in Polis in the season finale. In the fourth season, Bryan destroys a hydro generator in order to free some slaves and he later breaks up with Miller because he did not believe saving the slaves was the right decision. His current fate is unknown, but he likely died in the death wave as Bryan has not been seen since.
- Donna Yamamoto as Hannah Green (season 3): Mother of Monty and an Ark survivor from Farm Station, she is under A.L.I.E.'s control and shot by Monty while trying to rescue Octavia. After being used by the AI as a distraction in the City of Light, she is reluctantly deleted by her son and Raven Reyes.
- Ben Sullivan as Riley (season 4): A Farm Station survivor enslaved by the Ice Nation after the crash on Earth. He is eventually rescued along with the other slaves by other Ark survivors searching for a hydro generator in the wreckage of Farm Station. Traumatized by his imprisonment, Riley later tries to assassinate King Roan of the Ice Nation but is talked down by Bellamy and Echo. Riley takes part in Jasper Jordan's end of the world party before overdosing on hallucinogenic nuts, though it's unclear if it was an accident or an act of suicide. Riley's painless death inspires the other partygoers to commit mass suicide in the same manner.
- Kyra Zagorsky as Kara Cooper (season 5): A scientist from Farm Station who lost her father and husband in the Ark and bunker Cullings respectively. Put in charge of the bunker's food, Kara leads an uprising in the early days, sealing off the other clans so that only the Sky People can survive. The uprising leads to the death of Thelonious Jaha before its put down and causes Octavia to take on a more militaristic approach as Blodreina. Kara is the one to report on the fungus destroying the bunker's crop leading to cannibalism during the Dark Year. Kara subsequently becomes one of Octavia's most loyal followers and begins breeding the parasite worms as a weapon against the Eligius prisoners once the bunker is opened again. In order to save their friends, Clarke and Bellamy capture Kara and trap her in the biolab to be devoured by the worms in order to make it look like an accident and cancel the breeding program. Though Kara is killed by the worms, Octavia refuses to stop.
- Camden Filtness as James Crockett (season 6–7): An engineer from the Ark who studied under Jacapo Sinclair. Although he doesn't appear, James' name is on Clarke's list of Sky People that are chosen to survive in the Second Dawn Bunker in the fourth season. In season six, he is awakened from cryo along with all of the other surviving Sky People by Niylah to help save Marcus Kane with blood donations. James later starts a fight with Octavia over her taunts about his mother and helps to retake the ship from the Primes. In the seventh season, James is in charge of Sanctum's nuclear reactor following the deaths of Priya and Ryker Desai who controlled it before. While trying to fix a problem with his girlfriend Cora, James accidentally leaves his wrench beneath a control rod, preventing it from descending properly and causing the containment chamber to flood with radiation, killing James and Cora within moments. This triggers a nuclear meltdown that threatens Sanctum. With the help of Murphy, Emori, Hatch and three other Eligius prisoners, Raven manages to fix the reactor at the last possible second but at the cost of Hatch and the three other prisoners.

==== The 100 ====
- Jarod Joseph as Nathan Miller: One of the 100 and one of Bellamy's trusted lieutenants in the first season. He was among the surviving 47 held in Mount Weather in the second season. While in Mount Weather, it is revealed that Miller was arrested on the Ark for thievery. He is able to escape Mount Weather and is reunited with his father at the end of the second season, who was the head security guard on the Ark. In the first episode of the third season, Miller is reacquainted with Bryan, his boyfriend. He becomes a member of Arkadia's Guard but secretly sided with Kane alongside Harper as they tried to overthrow Chancellor Pike. He is one of the few Skaikru members who did not take A.L.I.E.'s chip to join the City of Light, and survives the battle in Polis in the season finale. In season four, he and Bryan break up and Miller's father sacrifices his place in the bunker so that Miller can survive the second nuclear apocalypse. In season five, he has entered a relationship with Jackson. In season six, he reconciles with Bellamy (being loyal to Octavia when she became Blodreina), and he fights the Primes along with his friends. In season seven, he joins the mission through the Anomaly to rescue their missing friends. Upon returning to the bunker, he shows remorse for his actions there which Miller is haunted by. Miller achieves Transcendence along with the rest of the human race, but decides to join the rest of Clarke's friends in returning to human form to live out their lives on Earth.
- Victor Zinck, Jr. as Dax (season 1, 3): One of the 100 imprisoned for the crime of murder, specifically for beating a man to death which Dax claims was because he stole from him. While angry at Atom, Octavia flirts with Dax and tries to sleep with him, but Atom stops her and reveals Dax's crime to her. Dax later takes part in the attempted hanging of Murphy and then Murphy's lynch mob chasing down Charlotte. After contact with the Ark is reestablished, Commander Shumway enlists Dax as an assassin, promising to ensure that Dax's mother will be on the first ship to the ground and to give him a choice assignment in exchange for Dax killing Bellamy in order to cover up the attempted assassination of Chancellor Jaha. Dax ambushes Bellamy who is suffering the effects of hallucinogenic nuts and when Clarke intervenes, reveals his deal with the commander. Following a fight, Bellamy manages to kill Dax by stabbing him in the side of the neck with a fallen bullet. The attempt on his life and his own guilt convinces Bellamy to offer Jaha information on who hired him to kill the Chancellor in exchange for a pardon which Jaha agrees to. Dax later reappears in a flashback in the third season to when Charles Pike is teaching a class on Earth skills to the 100 in preparation for their trip to Earth.
- Alyson Bath as Bree (season 1, 4): One of the 100. She first appears in the first season sleeping with Bellamy Blake and Roma when Raven's escape pod enters the atmosphere, causing him to rush off. In the fourth season, Bree takes part in Jasper Jordan's end of the world party, ultimately deciding not to go to the Second Dawn Bunker. Like the other party attendees aside from Harper, she commits suicide by taking an overdose of hallucinogenic nuts.
- Chelsey Reist as Harper McIntyre (seasons 1–5): One of the 100. She had a crush on Jasper at the beginning of the first season, although it ended up going nowhere. She is among the 47 held in Mount Weather in the second season, and was the first to have her bone marrow forcibly extracted from her. After escaping and returning to Arkadia, she joins Arkadia's Guard and secretly sides with Kane alongside Miller as they tried to overthrow Chancellor Pike. She is one of the few members of Skaikru who did not take A.L.I.E.'s chip to join the City of Light. She sleeps with Monty in the third season, and is saved by him in the season finale when a chipped Jasper knocks her unconscious and takes her hostage in Arkadia. In the fourth season, after feeling she sacrificed one of her own for her own survival she decides to stay behind with Jasper and Monty. She eventually comes to her senses and goes with Monty to recruit as many people to join them in the bunker. By the end of the fifth season, it is revealed that she died of a genetic condition after growing old with Monty and raising their son, Jordan.
- Katie Stuart as Zoe Monroe (seasons 1–3): One of the 100 who suffocated to death in a Grounder village after escaping a fire in the third season.
- Keenan Tracey as Sterling (seasons 1–2): One of the 100. He fell to his death trying to rescue his friend Mel, who was the sole survivor when her section of the Ark crash-landed.
- Genevieve Buechner as Fox (seasons 1–2): One of the 100. She is among the 47 held in Mount Weather. She was nearly killed for her bone marrow in Mount Weather, but Bellamy saves her. She is killed shortly after anyway for her bone marrow.
- Rhys Ward as Atom (season 1): One of the 100 who was an adviser to Bellamy and became romantically involved with Octavia. He was severely burned by the acid fog and Clarke killed him out of mercy.
- Izabela Vidovic as Charlotte (season 1): One of the youngest members of the 100, who was arrested for attacking a guard. She has recurring nightmares about Chancellor Jaha executing her parents. She attempts to stifle the nightmares by killing his son, Wells, but later breaks down and confesses before jumping off a cliff to her death. Despite murdering her best friend, Clarke chose to protect Charlotte from the more aggressive members of the group who wished to kill her, and banished Murphy because of her death.
- Brendan Meyer as Myles (season 1): One of the 100, who was killed by John Murphy for his part in the attempted lynching against Murphy.
- Josh Ssettuba as Connor (season 1): One of the 100, who was killed by John Murphy for his part in the attempted lynching against Murphy.

=== Grounders ===
==== Trikru (Tree People) ====
- Alycia Debnam-Carey as Lexa (seasons 2–3, 7): The Commander of the allied Grounder clans. She is willing to negotiate with the people of the Ark so they can save their people in Mount Weather and agrees to an alliance once Finn is dead. She views love as a weakness, and revealed that she previously had a girlfriend named Costia who was killed by the Ice Nation. Despite this, she allowed the Ice Nation into her coalition. She develops romantic feelings for Clarke, however, after a kiss, betrays her and Skaikru to save the imprisoned Grounders from the Mountain Men. She later sends Roan to find Clarke and bring her to Polis. She swears loyalty to Clarke after Skaikru are initiated as the thirteenth clan. Clarke goes to Lexa to say goodbye, where they confess their feelings for each other. Soon after, she is killed when she rushes into Clarke's room after hearing gunshots, only to get caught in Titus's crossfire. She returns via A.L.I.E. 2.0 to assist Clarke in defeating A.L.I.E. and says goodbye to her to help fight off A.L.I.E.'s henchmen so Clarke can find the kill switch. Her memories and persona remain a part of the Flame, through which she later offers guidance to its new host Madi, who gains a fresh perspective on the events prior to the death wave. Thanks to Lexa's memories of betraying Clarke at Mount Weather, which Madi describes as her greatest regret, Madi is able to dissuade Clarke from abandoning Wonkru to be wiped out in order to protect Madi. The current state of her consciousness is unknown as Raven was forced to delete the Flame at the end of season six, but at least the mind of the Dark Commander was uploaded to a different location, in his case, the Mind Drive of Russell Lightbourne. However, Madi continues to experience memories that Gaia believes could come from one or all of the other Commanders. In the series finale, the Judge takes on the form of Lexa to communicate with Clarke during the test to determine the fate of the human race.
- Dichen Lachman as Anya (seasons 1–2): The leader of one of the Grounder clans, and the main antagonist of the first season. In the second season, she is held captive in Mount Weather with Clarke who forms a reluctant alliance with Anya to escape. Clarke subsequently seeks her help in making peace with the Grounders, but she was killed by the guards of Camp Jaha because the guards thought that she was a threat. She used to be a friend and mentor to Lexa before she became the Commander.
- Joseph Gatt as Tristan (seasons 1–2): A military leader of the Grounders who takes command of the attack against the 100's camp at the end of the first season. Though heavily scarred, Tristan is one of the few to survive the ring of fire that kills most of the Grounder's army and hunts the few delinquents that escaped Mount Weather's roundup. He is ultimately shot and killed by Marcus Kane to save the captured delinquents.
- Adina Porter as Indra (seasons 2–7): A leader of one of the Grounder clans who considers Lincoln a traitor to her people. Her village is located in the ruins of Washington, D.C. and she was the one responsible for infecting Murphy with a deadly virus as a form of biological warfare against the 100. In the second season, she appoints Octavia as her second after being impressed by her bravery. In the fourth season, it is revealed she had a daughter named Gaia who refused to follow her mother's cause and learned to be a Flamekeeper. In the fifth season, she shows disapproval in the death games Octavia has arranged, admitting that the person Octavia has become scares her. Indra soon allies with Clarke and Bellamy to try to overthrow Octavia and prevent the impending war for the Shallow Valley without success. She is awakened from cryo in season six to help deal with the situation with the Primes and helps Marcus Kane commit suicide by blowing him into outer space. She reveals that she once saw the Dark Commander Sheidheda as a child and knows the evil and chaos that he can create. In season seven, with the Flame gone, Clarke has Indra effectively take command of Wonkru while still pretending that Madi has the Flame and is in charge. Following Clarke's departure, she acts as the de facto leader of the people from Earth and is the first to realize that Sheidheda has been resurrected in Russell Lightbourne's body. Indra is revealed to have lost her father as a child to Sheidheda while her mother bowed before him and she vows to personally kill the Dark Commander when it won't make him a martyr. In the meantime, she has Russell's Mind Drive surgically removed by Jackson to ensure that Sheidheda can never be resurrected again. She later takes command of Wonkru at the suggestion of Murphy and Emori to face the mounting threats. After the Dark Commander's resurrection is revealed to Wonkru at large, Indra loses a fight for leadership of the clan, bowing before Sheidheda to spare Madi. Though she begins serving the Dark Commander afterwards, Indra rescues Luca from the aftermath of a massacre and secretly supports Murphy's group. After being reunited with Gaia and Octavia on Earth, Indra reconciles with both. During the final confrontation with the Disciples, Indra finally kills Sheidheda and gets her revenge upon him. Indra achieves Transcendence along with the rest of the human race, but decides to join the rest of Clarke's friends in returning to human form to live out their lives on Earth.
- Ty Olsson as Nyko (seasons 2–4): A healer of the Grounders and considered Lincoln's brother because of their true friendship. He first appears to help save Octavia from a poisoned wound and due to his relationship with Lincoln, remains a friend and ally of the Sky People. He is killed by a drone who guns him down while trying to protect Luna.
- Luc Roderique as Penn (season 2, 7): A Trikru warrior loyal to Indra who doesn't like the idea of working with the Sky People. His argument with John Murphy leads to a brawl between the Grounders and Sky People. Penn later helps Raven and Kyle Wick get into the Mount Weather dam to destroy the turbines. Though not seen again following this, Penn survives the second nuclear apocalypse and the years in the bunker. In season seven, Penn is put in charge of guarding Sheidheda by Indra. He later takes part in the rescue of the people held hostage by Nikki and her forces and does not bow before the resurrected Dark Commander when his true identity is revealed. He subsequently remains loyal to Indra, only bowing to Sheidheda at her direction. He survives the final battle with the Disciples and achieves Transcendence along with the rest of the human race.
- Jessica Harmon as Niylah (season 3–7): A Grounder who owned and operated a trading post. She helps Clarke to escape from the Ice Nation bounty hunters. Niylah later sleeps with Clarke and becomes her lover. Later, she helps Clarke to free Raven of A.L.I.E.'s control. Clarke thanks her and tells her to hide until the time that A.L.I.E. is defeated. In the fourth season, after A.L.I.E.'s defeat by Clarke, Niylah comes to Arkadia to live close to her, but it was destroyed soon after by Ilian who blames Skaikru for the death of his family killed by him while under A.L.I.E.'s control. However, Ilian saves Octavia and Niylah from the resultant inferno and Clarke resumes her romantic relationship with Niylah and persuades her to remain in Arkadia. Later, Niylah goes with Clarke in the Second Dawn Bunker to be in safety. During the time where Clarke leads a group to save Raven, Niylah is attacked by some Sky People but is saved by Octavia who takes her in as part of her inner circle of associates for Niylah's own protection. Niylah becomes one of the first to be awakened upon arrival to Sanctum and joins Clarke's group in trying to rescue their friends from the Disciples. She later reveals to Echo that she is actually half-Trikru and half-Azgeda: her father was from Trikru but her mother was from Azgeda. Niylah achieves Transcendence along with the rest of the human race, but decides to join the rest of Clarke's friends in returning to human form to live out their lives on Earth.
- Neil Sandilands as Titus (season 3): An Old Guard who serves as an advisor to Lexa. His official position is as the Flamekeeper until he passes the title on to Clarke after accidentally killing Lexa. He kills himself in order to prevent Ontari from becoming the new Commander.
- Cory Gruter-Andrew as Aden (season 3): A Nightblood trained by Lexa. Aden is seen as polite and genuine when he speaks with Clarke about what should happen if he becomes Heda. He seems to care about Lexa, as seen in the episode "Watch the Thrones" as he corrects her when she asks him to tell Clarke what will happen when he becomes Heda; Aden responds saying if he becomes Heda. He is decapitated by Ontari in his sleep.
- Tati Gabrielle as Gaia (season 4–7): Indra's daughter and Titus' apprentice, who becomes the new Flamekeeper following the defeat of A.L.I.E. She has a strained relationship with her mother, who resents her for becoming a religious fanatic rather than a warrior, but they make amends as the death wave grows nearer. Gaia becomes a faithful follower of Octavia, guiding her to become the Red Queen, but becomes disillusioned with her methods and eventually persuades Madi to accept the Flame and become Commander, with Indra and Bellamy's help. All three are arrested for treason and sentenced to fight in Wonkru's gladiatorial games by Octavia, but after Monty provokes a brief uprising, Octavia pardons them. Gaia participates in Wonkru's invasion in the Shallow Valley, where she is wounded in an ambush by the Eligius convicts, but she survives. In the sixth season, she is banished on Sanctum by Madi at the urging of the Dark Commander after failing to stop him from negatively influencing Madi. Despite this, she remains loyal to Madi and works with the others to save Madi and create a rebellion against the Primes on Sanctum. After the destruction of the Flame, Gaia is left unsure of what her role is now since her purpose as Flamekeeper is gone without the Flame. She is abducted by a Disciple while trying to stop him from deactivating the Anomaly Stone and dragged through the Anomaly to an unknown location, not appearing on Bardo with her other captured friends. Its later revealed that Gaia was returned to Earth which has regenerated from the nuclear apocalypse and killed the Disciple. Reunited with her friends, Gaia and Indra mend their long-strained relationship before the bunker is invaded by the Dark Commander. Gaia achieves Transcendence along with the rest of the human race, but decides to join the rest of Clarke's friends in returning to human form to live out their lives on Earth.

==== Azgeda (Ice Nation) ====
- Brenda Strong as Queen Nia (season 3, 6): The former queen of the Ice Nation who killed Costia (former lover of Lexa) and attempted to overthrow Lexa, but was murdered at her hand. She later appears in a flashback in the sixth season where it is revealed that after Echo's best friend Ash killed the real Echo in self-defense, Nia forced Ash to take Echo's place and identity. In season seven, Niylah reveals that she was actually named for Queen Nia after Echo reveals to Niylah her true identity as Ash.
- Rhiannon Fish as Ontari (season 3): A Nightblood who served as the bodyguard for Queen Nia and later King Roan of Ice Nation. She succeeded Lexa as the new Commander after murdering the other Nightbloods. Due to her brutal nature Titus is hesitant to implant her with the Flame, which is actually an A.I. implanted in all commanders and gives it to Clarke who escapes Polis. Due to the requirement of having the Flame implanted to be commander, Ontari conceals this from the Grounder ambassadors with only Roan and Murphy aware of the truth. Later on, she seduces Murphy to sleep with her under threat. Afterward, she takes the chip given to her by Jaha in the hope that it will grant the knowledge of the past commanders. Later, A.L.I.E. decides that she cannot risk losing control of Ontari, the last of the Nightbloods, and orders Jaha to kill her. Though she survives, Ontari suffers brain damage and is unable to accept the Flame. Instead, she is used as part of a blood transfusion directly with her heart to allow Clarke to accept the Flame. She dies soon after Clarke destroys A.L.I.E., once Murphy stopped pumping her heart.

==== Other ====
- Luisa D'Oliveira as Emori (seasons 2–7): A nomadic Grounder who scours the wastelands in search of the City of Light. Emori and her brother later rob Jaha and his group for their supplies, and later meets up with Jaha and Murphy at the City of Light. When she returns to see Murphy, it is revealed that she is under A.L.I.E.'s control. She is freed when the City of Light is destroyed and joins Bellamy's group on the Ark monitoring station in the six years following the death wave, during which Raven teaches her technological skills and she and Murphy break up. After reaching Sanctum in season six, Murphy proposes to Emori using two Mind Drives and she accepts his proposal. Emori later begins posing as Kaylee Lee when she joins the Primes, an act she keeps up after the rebellion to help keep the peace on Sanctum. Having become a Nightblood, her help is enlisted by Raven to stop a nuclear meltdown and save Sanctum. Emori manages to fix the reactor core, but becomes sick from her radiation exposure. Emori's Nightblood allows her to survive and recover, but she takes longer than Murphy which forces him to deal with an escalating situation with the Faithful on his own. Emori is later severely injured in a corridor collapse and her heart stops as Raven, Murphy and Jackson desperately rush her back to Sanctum for treatment. Emori dies, but her consciousness survives on her Mind Drive which Murphy chooses to put into his own head despite it being inevitably fatal to him. When humanity achieves Transcendence, Emori and Murphy Transcend as well, but join the rest of Clarke's friends in returning to human form to live out their lives on Earth.
- Finn Wolfhard as Zoran (season 2): A deformed, nomadic Grounder boy who helps Jaha after he reaches Earth, until his father sells Jaha in exchange for horses so the family can search for the City of Light. He is presumably killed in the death wave at the end of season four as he is not seen again.
- Nadia Hilker as Luna (season 3–4): The Nightblood leader of the Sea People and the main antagonist of the fourth season. She fled her conclave to avoid further killing, allowing Lexa to become Commander. Clarke, Bellamy, Octavia and Jasper try to persuade her to accept the Flame following Lexa's death, so they can defeat A.L.I.E., but she refuses. Her people later die from radiation poisoning and she allies with the Sky People to find a way to recreate Nightblood and save humankind from the death wave, but after Emori is almost sacrificed for their experiments, Luna becomes disillusioned and nihilistic, believing the human race should end. She fights in the conclave for the Second Dawn Bunker, intending that no one will occupy it if she wins, and is one of the last competitors standing. After she kills Roan, Octavia outwits and kills her. Luna was perhaps the greatest warrior alive, and has implied that had she stayed and competed in the conclave she would have won, even against Lexa (whose fighting skill is renowned). Roan only defeated Luna when she was wounded, while Octavia's victory against her was due to cunning and deceit rather than superior skill.
- Chai Hansen as Ilian (season 4): A Trishanakru (Glowing Forest) warrior who killed his entire family while under the control of A.L.I.E. when they resisted the AI's control. Ilian's own life was spared when Clarke Griffin destroyed A.L.I.E., but Ilian held a grudge afterwards as a result and plotted to assassinate King Roan, though this plan was foiled by Octavia Blake. He later led looters in destroying all technology in Polis. Ilian set fire to Arkadia as part of his revenge, preventing it from being used as a safe haven against the death wave though he was unaware of the danger at the time. Despite a lynch mob wanting Ilian dead, Kane, Jaha and Octavia let him go free. He subsequently formed a romantic relationship with Octavia and was his clan's champion in the Final Conclave. A cheating Echo shot Ilian through the neck with an arrow, paralyzing and mortally wounding him. At Ilian's request, Octavia reluctantly mercy killed him to end Ilian's suffering. Ilian's death caused King Roan to banish Echo and Octavia to form a lasting grudge against her although the two women eventually reconcile.
- Lola Flanery as Madi Griffin (season 4–7): A 12-year-old Nightblood who Clarke meets 58 days after Praimfaya. The two become friends and Clarke begins to look after her. She is in effect Clarke's adopted daughter and has accepted the Flame to become the new Commander. However, in season 6, she falls under the influence of the spirit of the Dark Commander, an evil and insane previous Commander who, in the past, has been held at bay by the spirits of the other Commanders. At the end of the season, Madi breaks free of his control, but Raven is forced to delete the Flame to save her life. However, the Dark Commander survives by uploading himself to Russell Lightbourne's Mind Drive. Despite this, Madi continues experiencing memories that Gaia thinks could be from one or all of the other Commanders. Clarke becomes concerned with allowing Madi to have a normal life now that the Flame is gone and effectively designates control over Wonkru to Indra. Due to her memories from the Commanders, Madi becomes targeted by the Disciples. After undergoing Memory Capture to retrieve the code that the Disciples need, Madi suffers a massive and irreversible stroke from the strain which destroys the parts of her brain controlling voluntary movement. As a result, while Madi's mind remains intact, she is effectively left trapped in her own body. Before Octavia can mercy kill her, Levitt discovers that Cadogan got the code he needed from her and the three are forced to leave Madi in M-Cap until they can stop Cadogan. When humanity achieves Transcendence, Madi resists until Clarke convinces her to go. Unlike the rest of Clarke's friends, Madi chooses not to return, knowing that Clarke won't be alone and wouldn't want Madi to come back to a place where Madi would have no one her own age to love. The Judge reassures Clarke that Madi is at peace and will never age or die in her current state.
- Xavier De Guzman as Knight (season 7): A Sangedakru (Desert Clan) warrior who is disrespectful and challenging to his leaders. After learning of the Flame's destruction, Knight is enraged about the loss of Sheidheda's consciousness and leads most of Wonkru in abandoning the cause. Knight subsequently enjoys heckling Indra about it whenever he can. When Indra asserts herself as the new leader of Wonkru, Knight openly challenges her right to lead and fights Indra who effortlessly defeats him. With Wonkru now under her control, Indra places Knight in charge of getting their stolen guns back from the Eligius prisoners. Knight takes part in the rescue mission for the people held hostage by the prisoners and the Children of Gabriel, but learns of Sheidheda's resurrection from Murphy in the process. Along with another Wonkru guard, he immediately bows before the Dark Commander. Knight joins the Dark Commander, acting as his second-in-command. However, he visibly balks when Sheidheda orders him to kill everyone, even children though Knight reluctantly agrees to follow his orders. Knight is left to guard the door to the reactor room and kill everyone once it opens and he enlists the aid of two Wonkru members to take it down with a battering ram. During a second Red Sun eclipse, Emori lowers Sanctum's shield, causing Sanctum's bugs to rush in and devour Knight and his fellow Wonkru members before the Disciples arrive to drive off the bugs with torches.

=== Mount Weather ===
- Raymond J. Barry as Dante Wallace (season 2): The leader and president of the Mount Weather colony, who favours more diplomatic attempts to use the blood of the 100 to cure his peoples' own vulnerability to radiation. He is eventually ousted from his leadership role. He is killed when Clarke shoots him in the chest.
- Eve Harlow as Maya Vie (seasons 2, 6): A resident at Mount Weather who develops romantic feelings toward Jasper. Though initially unaware of Mount Weather's true intentions, she eventually realizes what is going on and assists Bellamy in his attempt to rescue the 47. She eventually joins a rebel faction of her people in hopes of overthrowing the Mount Weather government and helping Jasper. While trying to help Octavia, she is killed when Clarke releases radiation on the fifth floor. Having fallen in love with Maya, her death drives Jasper to depression and he becomes suicidal. Maya later appears in the sixth season as a manifestation in Clarke's mindspace after she becomes trapped when Josephine Lightbourne's Mind Drive is implanted into her. Maya confronts Clarke over her actions and later helps Clarke to temporarily trap Josephine before disappearing.
- Rekha Sharma as Dr. Lorelei Tsing (season 2): One of the doctors at the Mount Weather colony. She uses the 47 to extract their bone marrow in order to get to the ground with no remorse. She is killed when Bellamy exposes her and several guards to radiation, and when she tries to escape via an elevator; Jasper, Monty, Miller, and Harper stop her from escaping and watch her die.
- Johnny Whitworth as Cage Wallace (season 2): The son of Dante Wallace, and the main antagonist of the second season. He works on the Cerberus Project and plans to kill the 47 to save himself and everyone else. He later betrays his father when he tries to release the 47. When his people are dying of radiation, Lincoln cuts off his hand and injects him with the Cerberus Serum, killing him.
- Ian Tracey as Vincent Vie (season 2): Maya's father who is with her on assisting the 47 and leads a rebel faction. He is killed by one of the Mount Weather guards.
- Toby Levins as Carl Emerson (seasons 2–3): A Mount Weather guard and the right-hand man of Cage Wallace. He is captured by Clarke for information on Mount Weather but is sent back to tell Cage that she and the Grounders are coming. He becomes one of the few to receive the bone marrow transplant that allows the Mountain Men to survive in the outside world. He is the sole surviving resident of Mount Weather after Clarke and Bellamy irradiate the fortress and kill the rest of the Mountain Men to save the captive Arkers. He aligns himself with the Ice Nation and provides them with the self-destruct codes used to blow up Mount Weather, having lost his entire family when Mount Weather was irradiated. After Roan becomes king, Emerson is given to Clarke and Lexa as a peace offering. After long consideration Clarke spares him to show the other Grounders vengeance is not the answer. He returns to seek vengeance against Clarke and her friends, but Clarke manages to implant him with the Flame which can only be used by Nightbloods. As a result, Emerson's brain liquifies in seconds, killing him and ending the Mountain Men for good.

=== Pre-Apocalypse characters ===
- Erica Cerra as A.L.I.E. / Becca Franko (season 2–7):
  - A.L.I.E.: The avatar of an artificial intelligence who guides Jaha and Murphy to the City of Light and is the main antagonist of the third season. A.L.I.E. is responsible for causing the nuclear apocalypse 97 years ago (revealed to be on May 10, 2052). A.L.I.E. had come to believe that the problem was "too many people" and initiated the apocalypse to solve this problem. She uses computer chips to take control of peoples' minds as well as tempt others into doing her bidding such as Jaha wanting to lead his people, Raven wanting to stop feeling pain, and Ontari wanting to know the knowledge of previous commanders. She also tends to physically and psychologically harm them if they disobey her. At the end of the third season, Clarke Griffin, protected by the A.L.I.E. 2.0 AI, confronts A.L.I.E. in the City of Light on a manifestation of the space station Polaris. A.L.I.E. reveals that her actions have been to save humanity from a coming second nuclear apocalypse caused by the meltdown of power plants across the world that survived the bombing. Though Clarke attempts to get A.L.I.E. to give people a choice instead of using force, her programing prevents it. Clarke destroys A.L.I.E. by activating her kill switch, but believes the AI's warnings about the coming disaster, later confirmed by Raven Reyes. A.L.I.E. appears briefly in flashbacks at the beginning of the fourth season when Becca makes an appearance in Raven's hallucinations. Its revealed that removing A.L.I.E.'s chip using an EMP left some of the AI's code behind in Raven and Abby's heads, leaving them both, Raven in particular, with detrimental health effects as well as increased intelligence. Raven eventually manages to purge herself of the last of A.L.I.E.'s code by in effect "rebooting" her brain with a temporary death. The removal of A.L.I.E.'s code ends the negative effects on Raven's health which had nearly killed her. In the sixth season, a manifestation of A.L.I.E. appears in Clarke's mind to explain that Clarke still has a part of the AI inside of her from when Clarke entered the City of Light. As a result, Clarke's mind was protected from erasure when Josephine Lightbourne's Mind Drive was implanted. The manifestation of A.L.I.E. helps Clarke to hide the knowledge of how to get rid of Clarke's consciousness permanently.
  - Becca Franko: Becca was a brilliant scientist who created the two AI's A.L.I.E. and A.L.I.E. 2.0. Another innovation of Becca was Nightblood which she created to allow humans to metabolize extreme levels of radiation. However, Becca became concerned upon learning that A.L.I.E. thought the problem with humanity was "too many people" and locked the AI away which proved to be a grievous mistake. As Becca worked on A.L.I.E. 2.0 on her space station Polaris, A.L.I.E. escaped and began a nuclear holocaust that destroyed humanity. Despite this, Becca continued her work on A.L.I.E. 2.0 for another two years, believing the second AI to be humanity's best hope of survival. After the Polaris Commander demanded the destruction of A.L.I.E. 2.0, Becca fled Polaris in an escape pod as the station was destroyed. Having injected herself with Nightblood and A.L.I.E. 2.0, Becca became known as Pramheda, or "First-commander" in Trigedasleng due to arriving on Earth in the spacesuit of the Polaris Commander. Becca passed on Nightblood to the people she met upon landing, but was eventually burned alive by the Second Dawn cultists with the AI, which eventually became known as the Flame, being passed down to future Commanders. Like all Commanders, Becca's spirit was preserved within the AI and was able to help guide her successors. Becca appears mainly in flashbacks and hallucinations in the third and fourth seasons. At the end of the third season, Becca's spirit appears to Clarke Griffin through the Flame to guide Clarke in shutting down A.L.I.E. once and for all. When Clarke tried to reason with A.L.I.E., Becca informed Clarke that the AI could not change her way of doing things as her programing didn't allow it and witnessed as Clarke activated A.L.I.E.'s kill switch. In the fourth season, her lab and Nightblood research become a vital part of the attempt to survive the coming death wave. According to Gaia, Becca is buried in the Second Dawn bunker. While Raven's condition is deteriorating due to a remnant of A.L.I.E.'s code in her head, she is haunted by hallucinations of Becca. These hallucinations end when Raven finally manages to find a way to purge the code. In the fifth season, after taking the Flame, Madi experiences a memory of Becca being burned alive by the Second Dawn doomsday cult. In the sixth season, Becca is revealed to have created the Mind Drives that allow the Primes of Sanctum to be reincarnated through various new hosts when they die, the Mind Drives being similar to the Flame but without the artificial intelligence. At the end of the sixth season, the state of her consciousness that was saved in the Flame is unknown as the Flame was deleted, but the Dark Commander at least was uploaded to Russell Lightbourne's Mind Drive. Madi continues to experience memories not her own which Gaia suggests could be from one or all of the other Commanders. In "The Garden", Becca appears again through a Memory Drive recording where she expresses envy for the Eligius mission members and reveals that the planets are in close proximity to a black hole, explaining the time dilation experienced through the Anomaly and on Skyring. While discussing the planets, Becca expresses a preference for Skyring or Planet Beta over Russell Lightbourne's preference of Alpha. In "Anaconda", Becca is found by the Second Dawn after landing on Earth and uses the Flame to open the Anomaly to Bardo. However, she argues for using Nightblood to return to the surface rather than leaving the planet. Becca later discovers "the final code" which leads to Judgment Day and the end of the human race. After Becca refuses to give it up, Cadogan has her burned at the stake in order to take the Flame for himself. However, Becca befriends Cadogan's daughter Callie and informs her of the Flame's power and how to use the AI which Becca believes is the key to saving the world in the right hands. Callie steals the Flame back from her brother and using Becca's Nightblood, leads a group back to the surface to save the remainder of the human race. They take with them enough Nightblood to save 2,000 more people when they are found, continuing Becca's work of saving the human race. In the series finale, Cadogan locates the code Becca used in her memories and starts a test to determine if humanity will Transcend or be annihilated. The Judge, taking the form of Callie, explains to Cadogan that Becca had refused to take the test when she was given the chance.
- James Neate as Chris (season 2–3): One of the few scientists who helped create A.L.I.E. At the end of the second season, John Murphy finds a recording of Chris in the lighthouse bunker blaming himself for the nuclear apocalypse and A.L.I.E.'s actions before he commits suicide out of guilt. In a further video seen in the third season, his body is removed by two men who intend to use the bunker to survive, but apparently never make it back for some reason. In a flashback in the third season, Chris contacts Becca on Polaris to warn her that A.L.I.E. has escaped and is accessing nuclear launch codes. With Chris unable to stop A.L.I.E. and the nuclear apocalypse beginning, Becca orders him to the bunker for his own safety.
- Jordan Bolger as Miles Shaw (season 5–6): The pilot of Eligius IV who is amongst those who have arrived on Earth. When the prisoners rose up against the rest of the ship's crew, Shaw aided them in their escape and rebellion and they thus spared his life. He has shown a greater willingness to negotiate with the survivors found on Earth as opposed to the convicts' willingness to kill as the first option, and he ultimately rebels against Diyoza and McCreary, allying with Echo's group to help Wonkru win the war and developing a romance with Raven. He is killed by the radiation shield on Sanctum during the Red Sun eclipse.

==== Eligius Convicts ====
- Ivana Milicevic as Charmaine Diyoza (season 5–7): The ruthless leader of the Eligius IV spaceship that arrives in the Shallow Valley six years after Praimfaya. She is a former U.S. Navy SEAL Colonel-turned-terrorist who was arrested and cryogenically frozen for her crimes for most of the 100 years since the nuclear apocalypse that wiped out most of the population on Earth. She escaped captivity by murdering the original captain of the Eligius ship, and became the leader of the group of convicts aboard Eligius. She invades the Shallow Valley with her equally ruthless army and captures Clarke, but is coerced into freeing Clarke and rescuing Octavia and everyone in the bunker after being forced into a deal with Bellamy after Raven took control of Eligius IV. Diyoza is revealed to be pregnant with McCreary's child, which is the only reason he spares her life after usurping leadership of the convicts. In the sixth season, she is exiled on Sanctum and works with Octavia who is also exiled. After being led to the mysterious Anomaly, Diyoza is drawn inside by a hallucination of her child, leaving her fate unknown. In the season finale, Diyoza's daughter Hope, now an adult despite only days passing, emerges from the Anomaly and states that "he" has her mother before stabbing Octavia who disappears with the Anomaly. In the seventh season, it's revealed that Diyoza was sent to another planet later named Skyring by Hope. There, she, Hope and Octavia form a family for ten years while Diyoza finds peace and only seconds pass on Sanctum [due to time dilation from a black hole]. They are later captured by the Disciples from Bardo. Hope tells Gabriel and Echo that "he" is Anders, the leader of the Disciples and that she had made a deal with Anders to save her mother's life after being captured while trying to save Diyoza after successfully rescuing Octavia. Diyoza eventually escapes and reunites with her daughter, but is recaptured when Gabriel refuses to take a chance on going to Bardo's poisonous surface. Diyoza later joins the Disciples and sacrifices herself to save her friends when Hope attempts to release the Gen-9 bioweapon which crystalizes Diyoza.
- Mike Dopud as Michael Vinson (season 5): An insane and cannibalistic serial killer considered to be so dangerous that even the other Eligius prisoners leave Vinson's shock collar on to control him. Vinson himself states that he can't control his urge to kill and is known to keep his victims' hands and feet as trophies. In addition, Vinson is shown to brutally kill people by ripping their throats out with his teeth and then presumably consuming them afterwards. Vinson develops an obsessive infatuation with Doctor Abigail Griffin, getting her addicted to pills and thus dependent upon him. After Abby gets clean, Vinson attacks Marcus Kane, hoping that his death will drive Abby back into addiction and thus back to him. Enraged, Abby electrocutes Vinson to death using his shock collar. However, in the long run, Kane's injuries from Vinson's attack ultimately proves to be fatal. While he is only ever referred to by his last name, Vinson's full name is visible on an x-ray Abby gives him.
- William Miller as Paxton McCreary (season 5): A brutal serial killer who is amongst those who have arrived on Earth aboard Eligius IV after being cryogenically frozen for over 100 years. As a result, he has little knowledge of what happened on Earth after the nuclear apocalypse. He secretly wishes to replace Diyoza as leader of the convicts, but his methods demonstrate a fundamental reliance on violence, favouring killing potential enemies as the first option. He eventually usurps Diyoza after a mass riot incited by John Murphy, but spares her life after learning that she is pregnant with his daughter. McCreary eventually forms tentative alliances with Clarke and Kane to win the war, though he intends to completely wipe out Wonkru. After his army is defeated, McCreary launches the Damocles bomb which destroys the valley, the last habitable place on Earth, as an act of scorched earth. As McCreary demands a retreat into space, Clarke activates Raven's shock collar and Raven transfers the shock to McCreary by grabbing him. As he is stunned by the electrocution, Clarke stomps McCreary's head in and kills him. However, McCreary's destruction of the valley proves to be too much for the Earth which fails to recover and is left completely uninhabitable even thirty years later.
- Chad Rook as Hatch (season 7): A bank robber who is married to Nikki. According to Hatch, after a bank robbery gone wrong, the two murdered two cops and all of the hostages to get rid of witnesses. Unlike most of the prisoners, Hatch is depicted as having a much more friendly and accommodating attitude. As an impending nuclear meltdown threatens the lives of everyone on Sanctum, Raven enlists the help of Hatch and three other Eligius prisoners to fix the cooling system in exchange for all of the Jo Juice they can drink per Hatch's request. However, the radiation levels prove to be greater than Raven expected and the prisoners fall victim one by one to radiation poisoning. Unable to trust Hatch, Raven lies to him and sends Murphy, who is protected by Nightblood, to help Hatch finish the job. Hatch reveals that he already knows the truth and is continuing on for the sake of Nikki. With Murphy's help, Hatch manages to fix the cooling system at the last possible second before dying of radiation poisoning. The guilt-ridden Raven later suffers a hallucination of Hatch speaking to her from within a Disciple's armor. Throughout much of the remainder of the season, Nikki seeks revenge for his death, but after a speech from Murphy who had developed a great deal of respect for Hatch and actually confronting Raven, Nikki stands down. While helping Raven to rescue her friends, Nikki tells Raven that its what Hatch would've done.
- Alaina Huffman as Nikki (season 7): A bank robber and murderer who is married to Hatch. Unlike her husband, Nikki was into bank robbing for the chaos and murdered two police officers, forcing the couple to kill all of their hostages. On Sanctum, she is openly hostile unlike her husband and becomes vengeful towards Raven after Hatch dies helping Raven fix a nuclear reactor. Suspected of stealing all of Wonkru's guns, Nikki makes a blatant threat against Raven's life and later leads an uprising to get revenge. However, Wonkru crushes the uprising as Murphy attempts to talk Nikki down, appearing to almost succeed before they are interrupted. Nikki surrenders and is taken into custody. After Sheidheda takes over, Nikki leads the prisoners in bowing down to the Dark Commander and locates the massacre survivors. She is taken captive by Murphy and Emori and is apparently talked down from trying to escape by Murphy using the memory of Hatch. She eventually escapes and takes Jeremiah hostage, but is subdued by Luca. Getting Raven alone later, Nikki holds a box cutter to her throat and demands the truth. After Raven tearfully explains what happened, Nikki drops her weapon and leaves, deciding to leave Raven to live with what she did instead of killing her. No longer desiring revenge, Nikki comes to Raven's aid in rescuing her friends from the partially-collapsed bunker and leads the prisoners in helping Wonkru in holding the Disciples off. When humanity passes the test, Nikki Transcends along with everyone else.

=== The People of Sanctum ===
==== The Primes ====
- Chelah Horsdal, Tattiawna Jones and Paige Turco as Simone Lightbourne VI and Simone Lightbourne VII (season 6): Member of the Primes and a medical doctor. She is killed with her daughter by Russell during the first Red Sun Eclipse. Eventually resurrected through Nightblood hosts and her Mind Drive, Simone becomes one of the rulers of Sanctum, displaying a more callous and ruthless attitude towards life than her husband. It is stated that Simone was the one who instituted the punishment of burning at the stake and the Adjustment Protocol. After discovering Clarke Griffin to be a Nightblood, Simone has no compunctions against sacrificing the young woman to resurrect her daughter Josephine and works with Josephine to create more Nightblood by offering a deal to Abby Griffin to save Marcus Kane. However, the resurrected Kane rebels with the help of Indra and sacrifices himself to destroy the new Nightblood. With things having taken a turn for the worse on Sanctum in her absence, Simone pushes a hard line response. However, Tai, a Sanctum citizen who learned the truth about the Primes and lost his son to them, kills Simone with a broken glass. Russell burns Tai at the stake in punishment and attempts to resurrect Simone in the body of Echo using a bone marrow transplant to make Echo a Nightblood. After Echo escapes, Russell resurrects Simone in the body of Abby instead. With the Primes trying to flee Sanctum on Eligius IV, Clarke, having survived and killed Josephine, reveals herself when the Primes try to mind wipe Wonkru and confirm that Abby is really gone, her protection from A.L.I.E. having been destroyed by Clarke years before using an EMP. During a final confrontation with her host's daughter, Simone is blown into space along with the Mason family, killing her for good. Though Simone tries to cling to Clarke, Clarke recognizes that her mother is truly gone and shoves Simone into space. Russell later tries to use Abby's death to resurrect Simone in order to manipulate Clarke into killing him, but fails.
- Sara Thompson, Skylar Radzion, Gwynyth Walsh and Eliza Taylor as Josephine Lightbourne VIII (season 6-7): A biologist who named Sanctum before being killed by her father in a psychotic fit under the influence of the first Red Sun Eclipse. Josephine's death inspired Russell and her boyfriend Gabriel Santiago to spend twenty-five years of their lives to find a way to resurrect her, eventually succeeding through the Mind Drives and Nightblood hosts, causing the rise of the Primes. Six years before the people from Earth arrive, Josephine was killed by her best friend and fellow Prime Kaylee Lee for sacrificing innocent children to the forest to preserve the bloodlines. After Clarke Griffin arrives on Sanctum, Russell and Simone mind wipe Clarke and resurrect their daughter in her body. Josephine kills Kaylee in retaliation for her actions and later has Simone erase the Lee family from their Mind Drives. Josephine goes on to form an alliance with Murphy in exchange for immortality and offers Abby a way to save Marcus Kane in exchange for Abby creating more Nightblood. However, due to her experiences with A.L.I.E., Clarke survives the mind wipe and battles Josephine for control of her body which can only contain them both for so long. The two later form an alliance to survive after being captured by the Children of Gabriel with Josephine willingly relinquishing control to Clarke to escape execution. With the barrier between their minds close to gone, Josephine is able to manifest to Clarke in the waking world while Clarke is able to tap into Josephine's knowledge of Mandarin and motorcycle riding. Near death, Josephine is reunited with Gabriel for the first time in over 70 years before he removes her Mind Drive. However, Josephine manages to hang on inside of Clarke and attempts to kill her as she feels that Clarke will destroy Sanctum if she survives. With Bellamy's encouragement, Clarke kills Josephine with an axe inside of her mind, destroying Josephine's consciousness for good. Despite their differences, Clarke displays genuine remorse for killing Josephine, having only wanted Josephine to be safely removed from her body, not dead. Gabriel later reveals that he kept Josephine's Mind Drive as he had to be sure that she was truly gone. During a later Red Sun eclipse, Gabriel experiences a hallucination of Josephine who urges him to repair the Flame and use it to save humanity. Giving in at first, Gabriel destroys the Flame instead and takes the anti-toxin, causing Josephine to vanish for good.
- Ashleigh LaThrop as Priya Desai VII (season 6): Member of the Primes. She was killed by Russell with her son during the first Red Sun eclipse.. Russell revives her by killing Delilah Workman, a Sanctum Citizen and Jordan Green's lover. She is captured by Clarke posing as Josephine when she tried to escape to Clarke's friends. Bellamy holding Ryker's Mind Drive, compels Priya to reveal the truth about the Primes to the gathered crowd. Once Priya has admitted the truth, Bellamy gives her back Ryker's Mind Drive. However, Russell initiates the Adjustment Protocol in retaliation, unleashing a massive amount of Red Sun toxin upon the crowd which goes mad and attacks each other. Separated from Bellamy in the chaos, Priya is confronted by Delilah's enraged parents. Calling Priya a murderer, Blythe Ann, Delilah's mother, stabs her to death. Her Mind Drive remains intact and later falls into the possession of Jordan Green who had a romantic relationship with Delilah. In "From the Ashes", Priya's Mind Drive is destroyed by Russell after Jordan returns it to him, killing her for good.
- Thomas Cocquerel as Ryker Desai IX (season 6): Member of the Primes and an engineer. He was a child when Russell killed him with his mother during the first Red Sun Eclipse. After Gabriel Santiago burned the remaining embryos in an attempt to stop the Primes' resurrections, Simone Lightbourne planned to burn Gabriel at the stake. Ryker purposefully left Gabriel's cell door open so that he could escape, but he refused to help Gabriel stop the resurrections. Ryker explains to Raven that unlike the other Primes, he honors and respects his hosts. He is later blackmailed into helping form a rebellion against the Primes, but betrays and captures Echo as he is unwilling to let his family be killed. A reluctant Ryker is later assigned to turn Echo into a Nightblood and resurrect Simone in her body which requires mind wiping and killing Echo. Sympathetic with the obviously struggling Ryker, Echo reveals the truth about her identity to him, but fails to dissuade Ryker. However, Echo is rescued by Gaia and Nathan Miller and Echo stabs Ryker to death. Clarke, posing as Josephine, discovers Ryker's body first and removes his Mind Drive to use as blackmail with his mother Priya. Though Bellamy returns Ryker's Mind Drive to Priya, she is killed shortly thereafter. With the deaths of the other Primes and the destruction of Priya's Mind Drive, the dormant Ryker is the only Prime left in existence in any form aside from the defected Gabriel. After Gabriel's death in "A Sort of Homecoming", Ryker remains the only surviving Primes in any form. As he has no host body, Ryker does not Transcend with the remainder of humanity in the series finale and is effectively left dead for good with no one left to resurrect him.
- Lucia Walters and Kat Ruston as Miranda Mason VIII and Miranda Mason IX (season 6): Member of the Primes and a medical doctor. She is killed along with her lover by Madi Griffin. Russell revives her along with her family by killing Sierra, Jade and Bryson: three Sanctum Guards. Miranda is resurrected in the body of Sierra and later killed for good by Clarke who blows Miranda, her family and Simone into outer space.
- Bethany Brown as Jasmine Mason VII (season 6): Member of the Primes. Russell revives her along with her family as killing Jade, Sierra and Bryson: three Sanctum Guards. Jasmine is resurrected in the body of Jade who was originally the guard of her intended host Rose before Rose's death at the hands of the Children of Gabriel. Along with the rest of her family and Simone, Jasmine is killed by Clarke who blows the four Primes into outer space.
- Ian Butcher as Caleb Mason VIII (season 6): Member of the Primes. Russell revives him along with his family as killing Bryson, Jade and Sierra: three Sanctum Guards. Caleb is resurrected in the body of Bryson and along with the rest of his family and Simone, Caleb is killed by Clarke who blows the four Primes into outer space.
- Victor Lee VIII (season 6): Member of the Primes. He tries to flee Sanctum with his family by stealing Eligius IV. He is killed along with his son, Daniel, by Charmaine Diyoza. He is killed for good when Josephine orders her mother to delete his Mind Drive along with the rest of Lee's family.
- Daniel Lee VI (season 6): Member of the Primes. He tries to flee Sanctum with his family by stealing Eligius IV. He is killed along with his father, Victor, by Charmaine Diyoza. He is killed for good when Josephine orders to her mother to delete his Mind Drive along with the rest of the Lee family. He was homosexual or at the very least not strictly heterosexual as Daniel had a male lover named Zev who is one of the Adjusters. After being made one of the Primes, John Murphy poses as Daniel though his cover is blown when Murphy rescuing several children causes Zev to realize that he is not Daniel. Sheidheda, posing as Russell, later reaffirms Murphy's cover as Daniel. Murphy and Emori are later forced to reveal the truth about their identities and that the real Daniel and Kaylee are dead. Nonetheless, the survivors of the Primes' remaining followers continue to follow their lead, particularly Murphy's, due to the common danger of the Dark Commander.
- Faye Lee VII (season 6): Member of the Primes. She tries to flee Sanctum with her family by stealing Eligius IV. Whereas her husband and son, Victor and Daniel are killed by Charmaine Diyoza, she is killed by Madi Griffin. She is killed for good when Josephine orders her mother to delete her Mind Drive along with the rest of the Lee family.
- Sarah-Jane Redmond as Kaylee Lee VII (season 6): Member of the Primes and Josephine Lightbourne's best friend. As later revealed, she became against the ritual murder of Oblation after falling in love with a Null named Isaac. Kaylee killed Josephine six years prior to the arrival of the people of Earth in retaliation for Isaac's murder and framed Josephine's murder as an accident. Along with the rest of her family, Kaylee tries to flee Sanctum by stealing Eligius IV and becomes the sole survivor when the others are killed by Diyoza and Madi. She is later returned to Sanctum where she discovers Shaw's grave and helps Clarke's friends reach Sanctum. After Josephine is resurrected in the body of Clarke Griffin, she murders Kaylee in revenge for Kaylee's killing of her earlier. Kaylee is killed for good when Josephine orders her mother to delete her Mind Drive along with the rest of Lee family. After being made one of the Primes, Emori poses as Kaylee who is stated to have been against the Adjustment Protocol. After the rebellion on Sanctum, Emori continues posing as Kaylee to help keep the peace, using information from Kaylee's journal to help the act. One of the things that Emori tries is a Reunification Ceremony to reunite the Children of Gabriel with their parents, something that Kaylee had dreamed of making happen. Murphy and Emori are later forced to reveal the truth about their identities and that the real Daniel and Kaylee are dead. Nonetheless, the survivors of the Primes' remaining followers continue to follow their lead, particularly Murphy's, due to the common danger of the Dark Commander.

==== Sanctumites ====
- Karen Holness as Blythe Ann Workman (season 6—7): The owner of a tavern on Sanctum frequented by Clarke and her friends and the mother of Delilah Workman, the host of Priya Desai. Blythe Ann is extremely friendly and is often seen serving the patrons of her tavern. When Clarke's friends start a rebellion, Blythe Ann and her husband are amongst the first they tell the truth about the Primes to, including that Delilah is dead. Under the influence of the Red Sun toxin, Blythe Ann kills Priya in revenge for hijacking her body. She survives the rebellion and continues to run her tavern in the aftermath. Despite having killed Priya under the toxin's effects, Blythe Ann shows no remorse for her actions, stating that her daughter deserves justice.
- Ashleigh LaThrop as Delilah Workman (season 6): The daughter of Blythe Ann and Jae Workman, Delilah is a Nightblood and destined to be the future host of Priya Desai by the time the people of Earth arrive on Sanctum. Delilah forms a romantic relationship with Jordan Green which is cut short when Delilah is mind wiped to resurrect Priya. Though the Primes claim to be one with their hosts, Jordan becomes suspicious of the truth after Priya shows no knowledge of simple things Delilah liked. Jordan later learns the truth, but holds out hope that Delilah survived after learning that Clarke survived becoming the host to Josephine Lightbourne, unaware that it was because of Clarke's encounters with A.L.I.E. After learning the truth and under the influence of the Red Sun toxin, Blythe Ann kills Priya in revenge, killing Delilah's body as well. Her parents are seen mourning over her corpse after the rebellion is over. Blythe Ann subsequently shows no remorse for Priya's death, stating that Delilah deserves justice.
- Bethany Brown as Jade (season 6): A Sanctum guard assigned to protect Rose, the future host of Jasmine Mason. Rose is captured by the Children of Gabriel and ultimately dies before a devastated Jade's eyes. After Clarke Griffin is mind wiped to resurrect Josephine Lightbourne, her parents assign Jade as Josephine's personal guard, making her one of the few to know the secret. Jade's constant presence draws the suspicion of Clarke's friends and Echo captures Jade, forcing her to tell her the truth. Clarke's friends eventually abduct Josephine after learning that Clarke is still alive in order to save her. Jade later rescues Josephine from several Children of Gabriel, remaining behind to tend to the Prime as her men chase after the survivors. However, it is actually Clarke in control and she knocks Jade unconscious to steal her motorcycle, something that Josephine admonishes Clarke for as Jade had just saved her life. Jade later leads more guards who capture Gabriel Santiago and Octavia who have just saved Clarke and Josephine from the forest. One of Jade's men proves to be Bellamy Blake who kills the others and sends Jade back to Sanctum with a warning for Russell Lightbourne that he will never see Josephine again if something happens to their people. Jade leads a raid on the Children of Gabriel camp with Murphy to retrieve Josephine. Having killed Josephine, Clarke poses as the Prime to infiltrate Sanctum, pretending to kill the captives once Jade is outside to protect them. After the Primes get more Nightblood through bone marrow transplants, Jade is transformed into a Nightblood herself and mind wiped to become the new host for Jasmine Mason. However, this only lasts a brief time before Clarke kills Jasmine, the rest of the Mason family and Simone Lightbourne by blowing them and their hosts into outer space.
- Tom Stevens as Trey (seasons 6–7): One of the Adjusters cult, he is first seen trying to brainwash Jordan Green before being overpowered by Octavia Blake. In the seventh season, Trey becomes the leader of the Faithful, Russell Lightbourne's remaining fanatical followers though they are unaware that Russell is dead and that his body has been taken over by the resurrected Sheidheda, the Dark Commander. Under Trey's leadership, the Faithful are shown to use extreme methods to get what they want such as beating an attempted assassin to death and threatening self-immolation if Russell isn't released, willing to kill children too in order to get what they want. Originally trusting of Jordan Green, Trey eventually turns on the young man and later tries to kill John Murphy when its revealed that he is not Daniel Lee. Trey is one of the massacre survivors and joins the group hiding in the reactor room from the Dark Commander under Murphy's leadership. Though he follows Murphy's leadership, Trey is more reluctant than Jeremiah to accept their situation and suggests on a few occasions surrendering to the Dark Commander despite Murphy's warnings.
- Miles Chambers as Zev (season 6–7): One of the Adjusters and the boyfriend of Daniel Lee, one of the Primes who is impersonated by John Murphy. Unaware that Daniel is dead and Murphy is just impersonating him, Zev greets Murphy with a kiss following Daniel's supposed resurrection when Murphy and Emori rescue their friends from the Blood of Sanctum ritual. After returning with Gabriel to rescue the people trapped with the Adjusters, Murphy claims that "his" resurrection went wrong, causing memory problems as his reason for not remembering Zev. When Murphy and Gabriel subdue the Adjusters, Murphy chokes Zev unconscious, apologizing as Zev seems like a nice guy as well as a good kisser. In the seventh season, Zev returns as one of the Faithful, the remaining fanatical followers of Russell Lightbourne. When Murphy poses as Daniel again to rescue children from self-immolation, Zev locks the Faithful in the tavern, having deduced from his knowledge of Daniel that Murphy is not who he claims to be. When Murphy fails Trey's test, the Faithful attempt to burn him alive before being stopped by Sheidheda posing as Russell. Enraged, the Dark Commander strangles Zev and threatens to tear his tongue out before being interrupted by Indra. Sheidheda confirms Murphy's cover and on his order, Zev releases Murphy. He is later killed by Sheidheda after the truth is revealed.
- Tricia Collins as Tory (season 6): One of the Adjusters and their leader. She kills Layla when she refuses to drink Sanctum's blood. When Bellamy, Echo, Octavia, Murphy, Emori and Gabriel continue the rebellion on Sanctum, Tory tries to purify Sanctum through fire by burning down the tavern with the unfaithful in an act of self-immolation. However, she is thwarted from burning down the tavern by Octavia though Tory still dies in the process.
- Adam Lolacher as Jeremiah (season 7): One of the Faithful and the father of a young boy that the Faithful attempted to sacrifice to get Russell Lightbourne released. While posing as Daniel Lee to talk the Faithful down, John Murphy notices Jeremiah's son's plight and angrily intervenes, temporarily blowing his own cover in the process, but getting Jeremiah, who never wanted his son to be sacrificed and his son to safety. Jeremiah, still believing Murphy to be Daniel, later thanks him and Murphy invites Jeremiah for a drink before they are interrupted by Indra. Jeremiah is amongst the crowd of hostages taken by Nikki and Nelson and is devastated to learn of the truth about Murphy and Emori. He falls victim to Sheidheda's massacre, but survives, albeit badly injured and asks Murphy to take care of his son if he doesn't make it. Jeremiah recovers and, alongside his son, joins the other survivors in hiding under Murphy's leadership. He later expresses confidence in his decision to trust Murphy and helps distribute supplies sent by Eric Jackson and helps to clean up Luca. When things later grow dire, he expresses faith in Murphy to save them. He is briefly taken hostage by Nikki but is saved by Luca.

==== Children of Gabriel ====
- Kaylah Zander as Tosh (season 6): A more fanatical and militaristic member of the group, Tosh kidnaps Rose and Octavia Blake in order to kill the young Nightblood and deprive the Primes of a host. Tosh's more extreme views cause her to clash with Xavier, in reality Gabriel Santiago himself in a new host. After Diyoza, Jade and the Sanctum guards rescue the prisoners, Tosh kills Rose before Octavia manages to snap Tosh's neck.
- Carlo Marks as Cillian (season 6): A Sanctum doctor who is secretly a spy for the Children of Gabriel. After the Red Sun eclipse, he saves John Murphy's life from the seaweed toxin and forms a relationship with Clarke Griffin. However, after learning that Clarke is a Nightblood, Cillian attempts to take her to the Children of Gabriel to stop Clarke from being used as a host though he is unaware that Madi is a Nightblood as well. Though Cillian hits Clarke with a paralytic dart, she manages to make enough of a commotion to draw attention to her plight. When confronted by the Sanctum guards, Cillian commits suicide by slitting his own throat, but not before begging Clarke not to give the Primes another host. His actions have the unintended consequence of giving Russell and Simone Lightbourne the chance to resurrect their daughter in Clarke's body, though Clarke survives due to her experiences with A.L.I.E.
- Jesse Hutch as Jericho (season 6): The leader of a Children of Gabriel unit encountered by Josephine Lightbourne and Bellamy Blake while Bellamy is seeking Gabriel's help to remove Josephine from her host Clarke Griffin's body. Jericho and his unit take the two prisoner, though Bellamy hides the fact that Josephine has Nightblood to protect her from the Children of Gabriel's fanatical view on Primes. After failing to contact Gabriel, Jericho and two of his people return, only to discover that Josephine is a Prime with Bellamy identifying her in an effort to convince Jericho to spare Josephine's life as leverage over Russell. With Jericho preparing to execute her, Josephine willingly relinquishes control to Clarke who stuns Jericho, kills his two henchmen and escapes after giving Bellamy the keys to his shackles. Jericho and his men chase Clarke through the nearby forest, but she alerts Jade and other nearby Sanctum guards who shoot Jericho dead and chase after his men.
- Megan Danso as Layla (season 6): The sister of Gabriel's host Xavier who was unaware that her brother had been dead for ten years and impersonated by Gabriel himself. After learning the truth, Layla refused to trust Gabriel, Bellamy or Clarke, the former host of Josephine Lightbourne who had killed the Prime. After Clarke saved her from Jade, Layla finally realized the truth and aided in the effort to take Sanctum with minimal bloodshed. However, she was captured and executed by the Adjusters after refusing brainwashing.
- Lee Majdoub as Nelson (season 6–7): A high-ranking member of the group who helps to overthrow the Primes and protect the people of Sanctum when the Adjustment Protocol is initiated. Afterwards, Nelson appears to become the group's leader or spokesperson and pushes for the execution of Russell Lightbourne. During this time, Nelson learns that his parents, who abandoned Nelson as a baby to the forest, are still alive though he has no idea who they are. Despite his opposition to the beliefs of the Faithful, Nelson is shown to have compassion for them, risking his life in a futile attempt to save one from self-immolation and stating that despite their differences, they are still his people. After discovering that a resurrected Sheidheda has taken over Russell's body, Indra enlists Nelson's help along with Jackson's to remove Russell's Mind Drive in order to ensure that the Dark Commander can never be resurrected again. The Dark Commander subsequently reveals his true identity to Nelson and begins manipulating him in order to gain power. Thanks to Emori's efforts, Nelson is reunited with his parents who reveal that his real name is Sachin, but his fanatical father tries to kill Nelson, forcing Nelson to kill the man in self-defense. Nelson joins with the Eligius prisoners in taking hostages and forces Murphy and Emori to admit the truth. However, Wonkru quashes the rebellion and Nelson surrenders without a fight. Penn states that he gave them no trouble when he was locked up. After Sheidheda takes over Sanctum, Nelson and the Children of Gabriel refuse to kneel even though it means their deaths, Nelson declaring his name to be Sachin. Even when the Dark Commander kills his people around him, Nelson stands his ground and is shot in the head. Indra later closes Nelson's eyes in a gesture of respect and tells him in Trig that his fight is over.
- Dylan Kingwell as Luca (season 7): A teenage member of the group who befriends Madi. During Emori's Reunification Ceremony, he is reunited with his birth parents, but subsequently loses them both in Sheidheda's massacre. Along with the rest of the Children of Gabriel, Luca refuses to bow before the Dark Commander and he kills everybody with a machine gun. In the aftermath, Indra discovers Luca still alive amongst the bodies, the sole survivor of the Children of Gabriel and orders him to play dead. Under the guise of removing his body, Indra rescues Luca and takes him to Murphy and Emori for protection where Madi, Rex and Lee do their best to comfort him. He later knocks Nikki out after she escapes and takes Jeremiah as a hostage.

=== The Disciples ===
- Kamran Fulleylove as Dev (season 7): A Level 7 Disciple who is banished to Skyring for ten years as an unbeliever. Arriving just a few months after the kidnapping of Octavia Blake and Charmaine Diyoza, Dev forms a bond with the young Hope Diyoza, training and raising her with the plan to ambush the Disciples coming for him in ten years time in order to rescue Octavia and Diyoza. However, the plan goes wrong, leading to Dev being killed, forcing Hope to continue on alone. After returning to Skyring centuries later, Hope finds Dev's body amongst the skeletons dug up by Orlando. Orlando later promises Hope that he will rebury Dev with honor. After reuniting with her mother, Hope states that she considers Dev to be her father.
- Darren Moore as Orlando (season 7): A Level 12 Disciple banished to Skyring for breaking the commandment that he take a day of rest. Due to his ranking, Orlando is a formidable warrior who trained many of the younger Disciples himself. However, by the time that Gabriel, Hope and Echo arrive on Skyring, Orlando has been trapped for five years and has gone insane from the isolation. Orlando later smashes Gabriel's computer before the three can learn the code to open the Anomaly to Bardo. With no other choice, Gabriel, Echo and Hope are forced to wait five years for the Disciples to return for Orlando. Regaining his sanity, Orlando befriends the group and is eventually convinced to train them over the course of four years and eight months to become Disciple warriors, reaching Level 12 themselves. However, during the ambush, Echo notices Orlando's anguish over the harm the Disciples suffer and realizes that he knows them, likely having trained them personally. As a result, Echo becomes convinced that Orlando can't be trusted on Bardo and strands Orlando on Skyring with a knife to cut himself free. Another Disciple subsequently reveals to Clarke Griffin that Orlando committed suicide due to the betrayal of his friends and presents her with Orlando's suicide note detailing his time with her missing friends as proof of his story. After listening to one of Anders' sermons, Gabriel realizes that the Disciples came to Sanctum through the Anomaly, not Eligius III, meaning that Orlando didn't tell them everything. Anders later reveals to Gabriel that Orlando hung himself after they left and allows Gabriel to say a few words over his body before its sent to Nakara. Anders shows surprise at the amount of information that Orlando didn't tell the group about the Disciples and their religion. Anders later states that Orlando was one of the Disciples' best and Anders himself mentored him.
- Josh Blacker as Captain Meredith (season 7): The captain of a Disciple unit that is sent to Sanctum to retrieve the bodies of the Disciples that were killed by Echo and to capture Clarke Griffin. Meredith reveals to Clarke that she is supposedly the key to winning "the war to end all wars" and tells her about the destruction wrought upon his people by her missing friends. Meredith uses his superior numbers and cloaking technology to ambush Clarke and her friends to force her to surrender. However, Raven Reyes is able to use the armor of a dead Disciple to return the favor, killing Meredith and all but one of his men that manages to remain undetected with one of the Disciples' own energy weapons. Subsequently, Meredith appears in a flashback when Anders dispatches his unit to capture Clarke.
- Neal McDonough as Anders (season 7): The leader of the Disciples who is first mentioned by Hope in "The Blood of Sanctum". After seeing Octavia Blake's memories, Anders becomes convinced that Clarke Griffin is the key to winning the ultimate war and sets out to capture her at any cost, including torturing her friends for information. He is later killed by Hope who slits Anders' throat in an attempt to release the Gen-9 virus into Bardo's water supply. Diyoza stops the spread of the virus which instead only crystalizes the room, including Diyoza and Anders' corpse.
- Jason Diaz as Levitt (season 7): A compassionate Disciple scientist and a Level 11 who forms a bond with Octavia Blake while interrogating her using the M-Cap machine. When Hope arrives to rescue Octavia and her mother, Levitt helps Octavia escape to Sanctum and is the one who tattoos Hope's biometric code on Octavia's back. When Hope is sent to recapture Octavia, Levitt is the one to leave a message in Hope's arm to trust Bellamy Blake and the Anomaly Stone code for Bardo. He is taken off of Octavia's case just before Bellamy's apparent death and is replaced with another scientist by the time Gabriel, Echo and Hope arrive to rescue Octavia and Charmaine Diyoza. After rescuing Diyoza, the group encounters Levitt, now working as a janitor, near the Stone room. Levitt instructs the group to head for the planet's dangerous surface instead as the Stone room is too heavily guarded and admits to finding his demotion worth it. Octavia knocks Levitt out, but Gabriel ultimately stuns the others and surrenders as he finds the plan to be too dangerous. Levitt later helps Anders with the group's Disciple training during which time he and Octavia have sex despite the Disciple training to not feel emotions. When Echo decides to commit genocide using the Gen-9 bioweapon, she tortures Levitt into helping her. Octavia reluctantly gags Levitt again after learning the truth because the Disciples will kill Echo if Levitt calls for help and they reach Echo before Clarke's group can. A battered Levitt subsequently performs M-Cap on a Disciple suffering from PTSD and discovers that Bellamy Blake is still alive. Cadogan later calls on Levitt's services to dig through Madi's mind for the code, but Levitt becomes increasingly disturbed by Cadogan's methods and the danger he is putting Madi in. Turning on the Disciples completely, Levitt brings Clarke and Octavia to Bardo to stop him and rescues them from prison. However, Madi suffers a massive and irreversible stroke before they can reach her and Levitt discovers that Cadogan got the code from her mind. Levitt chooses to join the two women in stopping Cadogan from succeeding in his plans. After humanity achieves Transcendence, Levitt decides to join Octavia and the rest of Clarke's friends in returning to human form to live out their lives in peace on Earth.
- John Pyper-Ferguson as Bill Cadogan (season 4, 7): The leader and founder of the Second Dawn doomsday cult and the Shepherd of Disciple mythology. Cadogan first appears in season four in video footage uncovered by Thelonious Jaha while looking for a bunker to survive the coming second nuclear apocalypse. Under Cadogan's childhood home, Jaha, Clarke Griffin and Bellamy Blake discover what they believe to be the bunker, but it turns out to not have been shielded against radiation and everyone inside died. Jaha later locates the real bunker beneath Polis. In season five, after Madi takes the Flame, Cadogan appears in a flashback burning Becca Franko alive. In season seven, Cadogan is revealed to still be alive and the Shepherd of Disciple mythology that led them to Bardo after the first nuclear apocalypse. Held in stasis for centuries, Cadogan is awakened by Anders who reveals that they have found the key to winning "the Last War." In "Anaconda", its revealed that Cadogan found the Anomaly Stone beneath the Temple of the Sun in Machu Picchu and spent over a decade trying to decipher it. By the time that Becca arrives on Earth, Cadogan is already worshipped by the surviving cultists and rejects any other solution aside from leaving the Earth. After Becca figures out how to open the Anomaly with the Flame, Cadogan rejects Nightblood as a solution and became intrigued by her discovery of a code that leads to "Judgment Day." Cadogan executes Becca to get the Flame, but his own daughter Callie escapes with it and a group of people who had taken Nightblood, intending to save the rest of the human race. Cadogan sends his son Reese, also a Nightblood, to retrieve the Flame and leads the Second Dawn, now calling themselves the Disciples, to Bardo. In the present, Clarke claims that Callie is still alive in her mind, but is reluctant to help him, later revealed to be a lie in order to have leverage over the Disciples. Held hostage, Cadogan reveals that logs left behind the native Bardoans revealed a Last War that, once won, would allow a species to achieve Transcendence, but he needs the code that Becca found in order to start it. Examining the logs himself, Jordan Green becomes convinced that the Disciples mistranslated them and that the logs actually speak of a test, not a Last War which the group keeps secret from Cadgoan. After learning the truth from Bellamy about the Flame's destruction, Cadogan ruthlessly pursues the code, torturing Clarke, her friends and eventually Madi to get it. His actions cause Madi to suffer a massive and irreversible stroke, but he succeeds in getting the code from Becca's memories which had been left in Madi's mind. Cadogan uses the code and meets the Judge, a Transcended being taking on the form of Callie, who reveals that Jordan was right about it being a test and not a Last War. As Cadogan begins the test, he is shot dead from behind by Clarke in revenge for his actions. Although humanity ultimately achieves Transcendence, the Judge reveals to Clarke that she never can due to murdering Cadogan during the test.
- Jonathan Scarfe as Doucette (season 7): A Disciple Conductor who Bellamy takes hostage upon his arrival on Bardo. Both are apparently killed when a Disciple explodes a grenade but are instead blown backwards through the Anomaly to Etherea. After subduing Doucette, Bellamy treats his injuries and the two men reluctantly form an alliance to survive and get off of the planet. After spending over two months trapped together in a cave by a snowstorm, Bellamy agree to try praying with Doucette and receives a vision that converts him to the Disciple cause. While climbing a cliff face, Doucette nearly falls to his death and urges Bellamy to let him go, but Bellamy saves his life and they return to Bardo together where Bellamy becomes a Disciple. Doucette reassures Bellamy that his friends will understand when the Last War comes and joins Cadogan's group in traveling to Sanctum to find the Flame. He is later shot and killed by Clarke Griffin in defense of Gabriel Santiago and with his last words, he urges Bellamy not to ever lose faith.
- Alex Barima as Kwame (season 7): A young Disciple who trains alongside Echo, Hope Diyoza, Charmaine Diyoza and Octavia Blake when they join the Disciples. Kwame later becomes the commander of the force of Disciples preparing for the last war when Clarke and Octavia return to Bardo and are captured. Kwame's forces subsequently enter into a standoff with Wonkru and the Eligius prisoners that is broken when Sheidheda provokes a battle. After the Dark Commander's death, Octavia gives a speech urging both sides to stand down. After a moment of hesitation, Kwame leads the Disciples in standing down, resulting in humanity passing the test and achieving Transcendence.

=== The Transcended ===
- Iola Evans, Alycia Debnam-Carey and Paige Turco as The Judge (season 7): A Transcended being who judges a species on whether or not they are worthy of Transcendence. If they fail the test, the Judge sends a bioweapon known as Gem-9 to wipe out the entire species which includes the Bardoans, the original natives to the Disciple homeworld Bardo. After Bill Cadogan enters the final code, he meets with the Judge in the form of his daughter Callie who explains that their form is a test subject's greatest teacher, the source of their greatest failure, or in rare cases, their greatest love. As the Judge begins the test, Cadogan is killed by Clarke Griffin, but the test has already begun. The Judge subsequently takes on the form of Lexa, Clarke's greatest love, to test her. Based on Clarke, the Judge decides that humanity is not worthy of Transcendence and will be wiped out. Raven Reyes, unwilling to give up, enters the Judge's realm where she attempts to convince the Judge, now in the form of Abby Griffin, to change her mind. The Judge shows Raven the budding war between Wonkru and the Disciples as proof of her decision, but after Octavia talks both sides down, changes her mind and Transcends the entire human race aside from Clarke. Later, once again in the form of Lexa, the Judge appears to Clarke on a beach on Earth to explain that Clarke's murder of Cadogan during the test means that she can never Transcend. The Judge reassures Clarke that Madi is safe and happy in her current state and reveals that Clarke's friends have chosen to return to human form to live out their lives though they can't Transcend again or have children. Watching Clarke's group, the Judge musses that humanity is "a curious species indeed" before vanishing.
