= The 100 season 7 =

The 100
- Season 7
- Promotional release poster
- Starring: Eliza Taylor; Bob Morley; Marie Avgeropoulos; Lindsey Morgan; Richard Harmon; Tasya Teles; Shannon Kook; JR Bourne; Chuku Modu; Shelby Flannery
- No. of episodes: 16

Release
- Original network: The CW
- Original release: May 20 – September 30, 2020

Season chronology
- ← Previous; Season 6

The seventh and final season of the American post-apocalyptic science fiction drama The 100 premiered on May 20, 2020, on The CW, for the 2019–20 United States network television schedule. The series, developed by Jason Rothenberg, is based on the novel series of the same name by Kass Morgan, and follows a group of post-apocalyptic survivors, chiefly a group of criminal adolescents, including Clarke Griffin (Eliza Taylor), Bellamy Blake (Bob Morley), Octavia Blake (Marie Avgeropoulos), Raven Reyes (Lindsey Morgan), and John Murphy (Richard Harmon). They are among the first people from a space habitat, the Ark, to return to Earth after a devastating nuclear apocalypse. After airing sixteen episodes, the season concluded on September 30, 2020.

== Cast and characters ==
=== Main ===
- Eliza Taylor as Clarke Griffin
- Bob Morley as Bellamy Blake
- Marie Avgeropoulos as Octavia Blake
- Lindsey Morgan as Raven Reyes
- Richard Harmon as John Murphy
- Tasya Teles as Echo / Ash
- Shannon Kook as Jordan Green
- JR Bourne as Russell Lightbourne / Malachi / Sheidheda
- Chuku Modu as Gabriel Santiago
- Shelby Flannery as Hope Diyoza

=== Recurring ===
- Sachin Sahel as Eric Jackson
- Jarod Joseph as Nathan Miller
- Adina Porter as Indra
- Luc Roderique as Penn
- Luisa D'Oliveira as Emori
- Jessica Harmon as Niylah
- Tati Gabrielle as Gaia
- John Pyper-Ferguson as Bill Cadogan
- Lola Flanery as Madi Griffin
- Ivana Miličević as Charmaine Diyoza
- Karen Holness as Blythe Ann Workman
- Dean Marshall as Jae Workman
- Lee Majdoub as Nelson
- Tom Stevens as Trey
- Alaina Huffman as Nikki
- Jason Diaz as Levitt
- Neal McDonough as Anders
- Jonathan Scarfe as Doucette

=== Guest ===
- Paige Turco as Abby Griffin / the Judge
- Alycia Debnam-Carey as Lexa / the Judge
- Erica Cerra as Becca Franko
- Sara Thompson as Josephine Lightbourne I
- Dakota Daulby as Malachi/Sheidheda
- Camden Filtness as James Crockett

== Episodes ==
The number in the "No. overall" column refers to the episode's number within the overall series, whereas the number in the "No. in season" column refers to the episode's number within this particular season. Numerous episodes are named after similarly named episodes from the original series. "Production code" refers to the order in which the episodes were produced while "U.S. viewers (millions)" refers to the number of viewers in the U.S. in millions who watched the episode as it was aired.

No. overall	No. in season	Title	Directed by	Written by	Original release date	Prod. code	U.S. viewers (millions)
85	1	"From the Ashes"	Ed Fraiman	Jason Rothenberg	May 20, 2020	T27.14051	0.80
After Octavia's departure, Bellamy is kidnapped by invisible figures while Hope has amnesia. Gabriel, Hope and Echo chase after Bellamy's kidnappers. After experiencing a hallucination of Roan and the real Echo, Echo kills three of them. With the anomaly closing, Gabriel, Echo and Hope choose to follow the others through it to find Bellamy. With the various factions now living together in Sanctum, tensions rise, particularly with the Children of Gabriel demanding Russell's execution while Murphy is guilt-stricken over his role in Abby's death and Madi continues to experience memories from one or more of the Commanders. A depressed and suicidal Russell destroys Priya's mind drive and goads Clarke into killing him; after Clarke knocks Russell unconscious, he is greeted by Sheidheda in the Mindspace who had uploaded himself into Russell's mind drive when the Flame was destroyed. The Dark Commander kills Russell and resurrects himself in Russell's body. Unaware of this, Clarke burns down the Sanctum palace and announces a new beginning for Sanctum and that "Russell" will be executed the next day for his crimes.
86	2	"The Garden"	Dean White	Jeff Vlaming	May 27, 2020	T27.14053	0.76
Octavia arrives on Skyring three months after following Diyoza through the anomaly due to time dilation. With her arm fully healed, Octavia forms a family with Diyoza and Hope over the next ten years. For six years, Octavia attempts to return through the anomaly to Sanctum, but it is too deep underwater. Giving up, Octavia sends a message in a bottle to Bellamy through the anomaly and settles into life on Skyring. However, her message is intercepted by the Disciples on Bardo who capture Octavia and Diyoza, though Octavia manages to hide Hope from discovery. In the present, Hope, Gabriel and Echo arrive on Skyring centuries after Hope left, with Hope's memory restored. The three attempt to follow the Disciples to Bardo, but they discover the code has washed away from Hope's note. Stranded, the group discovers that the Disciples turned it into a prison planet for the weak and will return in five years. Gabriel discovers the body of Colin, an old friend of his, and he realizes that Skyring is in fact planet Beta from the Eligius III colony mission, suggesting that Bardo is another Eligius planet and that the Disciples are the descendants of other colonists that had settled there. Hope explains that she only injected Octavia with a locator tag to send her through the anomaly; a recording of Becca reveals that the time dilation is caused by proximity to a nearby black hole. Though Gabriel discovers the code on Colin's Memory Drive, a prisoner named Orlando destroys his computer before they can record it for use.
87	3	"False Gods"	Tim Scanlan	Kim Shumway	June 3, 2020	T27.14052	0.71
As his execution approaches, Sheidheda manipulates the situation so that killing him will create a martyr and cause the fanatics to destroy Sanctum, forcing Clarke to stop the execution. At the same time, while trying to fix Sanctum's nuclear reactor, James Crockett accidentally triggers a nuclear meltdown with his carelessness and is killed in the process. After Gaia reveals the truth about the Flame, many in Wonkru abandon the cause, forcing Raven to turn to the Eligius prisoners for help. Hatch, a former bank robber, and three other prisoners volunteer alongside Murphy and Emori whose Nightblood offers them protection to fix the core itself. However, the radiation exposure proves fatal to the prisoners, forcing Raven to lie to them in order to get them to fix the cooling system in time. With the help of Murphy, Hatch is able to complete the job at the last possible second before dying from the radiation exposure.
88	4	"Hesperides"	Diana Valentine	Sean Crouch	June 10, 2020	T27.14054	0.63
A few months after the kidnapping of Octavia and Diyoza, a Disciple prisoner named Dev arrives on Skyring, forming a bond with Hope. They plot to ambush the Disciples when they return in ten years in order to go through the anomaly to rescue Octavia and Diyoza. However, the plan goes wrong and Dev is killed, forcing Hope to continue on alone. In the present, Gabriel, Echo, and Hope are forced to wait for the Disciples' return; they learn that the Disciples believe that there will be a last war and that they worship Eligius III as a deity that saved them from the Earth's destruction. The Disciple prisoner Orlando trains them, allowing them to successfully ambush the Disciples five years later, but Echo refuses to trust Orlando further and abandons him on Skyring, and Orlando subsequently commits suicide. On Sanctum, Raven, haunted by the deaths that she caused, studies the armor of a Disciple that Echo had killed, learning that the anomaly is a wormhole. The Disciples demand Clarke's surrender, claiming that she holds the key to winning the last war. Raven rescues her friends using the Disciple armor and leads Clarke, Jordan, Niylah and Miller through the anomaly in order to find their missing friends; Gaia remains behind but is ambushed by a surviving Disciple who deactivates the anomaly stone and drags Gaia through with him. Clarke and the others arrive on Nakara, an ice planet, with no sign of an anomaly stone to enable them to leave.
89	5	"Welcome to Bardo"	Ian Samoil	Drew Lindo	June 17, 2020	T27.14055	0.68
After arriving on Bardo, Octavia's memories are scanned by Levitt, a compassionate Disciple scientist who takes an interest in Octavia. Hope eventually arrives and rescues Octavia with Levitt's help, returning her to Sanctum which causes Octavia to lose her memory of her time away. Captured in an attempt to rescue her mother, Hope reluctantly helps Anders return Octavia to Bardo for further interrogation. After Octavia pulls Hope through the anomaly to Sanctum, Hope injects her with a locator tag which sends Octavia back to Bardo. When Bellamy arrives, he overpowers his captors and attempts to save his sister, however a Disciple sets off an explosion, apparently killing Bellamy who vanishes. In the present, Echo, Hope and Gabriel arrive on Bardo, learning from one of Anders' sermons that the Disciples came to Bardo through the anomaly rather than Eligius III. They rescue Octavia, but learn of Bellamy's apparent death. On Sanctum, Russell's followers attempt to force his release with Murphy's attempt to help as Daniel Prime putting his life into danger. Sheidheda talks the Faithful down, but his behavior causes Indra to realize his true identity. Unable to kill Sheidheda just yet, Indra has Russell's mind drive surgically removed by Jackson so that the Dark Commander can't ever be resurrected again.
90	6	"Nakara"	PJ Pesce	Erica Meredith	June 24, 2020	T27.14056	0.57
On Bardo, Diyoza escapes her captors and reunites with Hope, Echo, Octavia and Gabriel. With the stone room heavily guarded, Levitt instructs the group to head for the planet's dangerous surface. However, Gabriel is unwilling to take the risk and stuns the others before surrendering to the Disciples. On Nakara, Clarke's group discovers that the Disciples use the planet as a burial ground for their dead. They search for the anomaly stone which proves to be inside of a giant creature. Despite facing dangers inside of the creature, the group manages to reach the anomaly stone and make their way to Bardo. Before leaving, Miller and Niylah discover a sigil suggesting a connection between the Disciples and the Second Dawn doomsday cult that had built the bunker. On Sanctum, Wonkru's guns are stolen, presumably by the Eligius prisoners, while Sheidheda begins manipulating Nelson to get power. Indra attempts to get Madi to become the Commander again, but she is ultimately too afraid. At Murphy and Emori's suggestion, Indra reunites Wonkru to face the mounting threats under her own leadership instead.
91	7	"The Queen's Gambit"	Lindsey Morgan	Miranda Kwok	July 1, 2020	T27.14057	0.64
On Sanctum, Sheidheda challenges Murphy to a game of chess, revealing that something terrible is about to happen and offering information if Murphy wins. This proves to be a distraction so that Emori won't have Murphy's support in her venture: she organizes a ceremony to reunite the Children of Gabriel with their families. However, Nelson's father attacks him, forcing Nelson to kill him in self-defense. Nelson then joins the Eligius prisoners in taking over the gathering along with the Children of Gabriel and Nikki states that they need to make demands. On Bardo, Gabriel agrees to join the team studying the anomaly stone, while Hope and her mother bond. Echo realizes that the Disciples are trying to recruit them for the coming war and leads her friends in agreeing to join them. Clarke's group arrives on Bardo three months after Echo's group did, and Gabriel reveals Bellamy's apparent death to a devastated Clarke. With Clarke on Bardo, Anders awakens the Shepherd from stasis to announce the Disciples' acquisition of the key. The Shepherd is revealed to be Bill Cadogan, the founder and leader of the Second Dawn doomsday cult.
92	8	"Anaconda"	Ed Fraiman	Jason Rothenberg	July 8, 2020	T27.14063	0.67
On Earth pre-apocalypse, Cadogan's ex-wife Grace and daughter Callie, who created the Grounder language as a child, flee to the Second Dawn bunker as nuclear Armageddon strikes. Having discovered the anomaly stone underneath the Temple of the Sun in Machu Picchu, Cadogan focuses solely on opening a door to another world rather than finding a way to retake the surface of the planet. Two years later, Becca arrives from Polaris and using the Flame, is able to open the portal to Bardo; although Becca insists on using Nightblood to retake the surface instead, Cadogan is adamant about leaving. While bonding with Callie, Becca discovers the stone code leading to what she calls Judgment Day, the true end of the human race; Cadogan has her locked up for refusing to cooperate further and then burned at the stake to get the Flame. Informed of the AI's significance by Becca, Callie steals back the Flame and leaves with people she has convinced to take Nightblood, bringing with them enough Nightblood to save 2,000 more people. Grace is exiled for helping them and Callie's brother Reese and another cultist Tristan, both Nightbloods, agree to chase after them to retrieve the Flame; once they are gone, Cadogan leads his remaining followers to Bardo. In the present, Cadogan reveals that the Flame is the key that they seek and Clarke claims that Callie's mind has survived. Cadogan brings in Octavia, Diyoza and Echo, all apparently fully brainwashed into the Disciple cause.
93	9	"The Flock"	Amyn Kaderali	Alyssa Clark	July 15, 2020	T27.14058	0.61
Three months ago on Bardo, Echo, Octavia, Diyoza and Hope are introduced to the Disciple way of life and undergo training; Octavia begins a romantic relationship with Levitt while all but Hope dedicate themselves to the cause and the coming war against the enemy that had killed the native Bardoans. With Hope continuing to resist, she is sentenced to five years imprisonment on Skyring at Echo's suggestion. In the present on Sanctum, Nikki demands that Murphy, Sheidheda and Raven surrender themselves within twenty minutes or she will start executing hostages. Murphy and Indra reluctantly form an alliance with the Dark Commander who points them to a secret tunnel. Nelson forces Murphy and Emori to admit the truth about their identities, which Sheidheda does as well. When Nikki prepares to execute Emori for Raven's failure to appear, Murphy admits to being the one to suggest using the prisoners to fix the reactor. He tries to talk Nikki down peacefully, buying time for Wonkru to invade causing Nikki and Nelson to surrender. With the truth about Russell's death revealed, Indra locks him in with many of the angry Sanctumites, only to have the Dark Commander slaughter them all. The Dark Commander declares that his fight has only just begun, while Knight and another Wonkru guard bow before him.
94	10	"A Little Sacrifice"	Sherwin Shilati	Nikki Goldwaser	August 5, 2020	T27.14059	0.47
On Bardo, Echo, Hope, Gabriel, Octavia and Diyoza are revealed to have been pretending to be on the Disciples' side while secretly plotting against them. Cadogan shows Gabriel, Niylah and Jordan logs left behind by the native Bardoans describing the same effect that Becca had experienced when she entered the final code into the anomaly stone; the logs mention a last war and achieving transcendence, the source of the Disciples belief system. However, upon closer examination, Jordan believes that the language has been mistranslated and it is a test to determine the fate of the human race, not a war. The Disciples need the Flame to reach this test, believing it to be in Clarke's head due to Octavia's memory of Clarke using the Flame to destroy A.L.I.E. Cadogan attempts to convince Gabriel that winning this perceived war will lead to a permanent peace as Echo attempts to release the Gem-9 bioweapon to wipe out the Disciples in revenge for Bellamy's apparent death. Though Echo is talked down, Hope kills Anders and attempts to release it herself; Diyoza sacrifices herself to stop the attempted genocide and to save her daughter and friends. On Sanctum, Sheidheda works to solidify his position, revealing his resurrection to Wonkru and defeating Indra in combat for leadership of the clan, though Madi manages to blind the Dark Commander in one eye. Hunted by Sheidheda and Wonkru, Murphy rallies the massacre survivors under his leadership to hide out and prepare to fight back against the Dark Commander's reign.
95	11	"Etherea"	Aprill Winney	Jeff Vlaming	August 12, 2020	T27.14060	0.58
While treating a Disciple for PTSD from the explosion that had apparently killed Bellamy, Levitt discovers from his memories that Bellamy survived and was flung through the anomaly instead. Bellamy and his hostage Conductor Doucette emerge from the anomaly on the planet Etherea where Bellamy treats the other man's injuries and they form a reluctant alliance to reach the anomaly which is on top of a steep mountain. During their journey, Bellamy learns that the planet's original inhabitants apparently transcended into beings of light and after a vision of his mother and Bill Cadogan, begins believing in the Disciple cause. Bellamy and Doucette travel for over two months together, surviving a massive winter storm and a hazardous climb in which Bellamy chooses to save Doucette rather than let him fall. After finally reaching the anomaly stone, the two men are forced to make a literal leap of faith into the anomaly far below them. Emerging on Bardo, Bellamy pledges himself to Cadogan and betrays his friends, revealing that the Flame has been destroyed and negating their leverage over the Disciples.
96	12	"The Stranger"	Amanda Row	Blythe Ann Johnson	August 19, 2020	T27.14062	0.54
On Bardo, Bellamy convinces Cadogan to spare his friends in exchange for his help in finding and repairing the Flame to begin the last war; when the others refuse to help, Bellamy allows their memories to be scanned, leading to a tense confrontation with his friends. Clarke eventually offers to help Cadogan if he frees the others, but he sends everyone but Raven and Gabriel to a different planet instead to ensure Clarke's compliance. On Sanctum, Sheidheda massacres the Children of Gabriel when they refuse to kneel although Luca survives and is rescued by Indra. Taking up residence in the machine shop, Murphy and Emori work to protect the survivors of the earlier massacre; although Nikki finds them, she is captured and Murphy seemingly talks her down using the memory of Hatch. Sheidheda locates the group hiding in the reactor and takes Murphy captive, but Emori threatens to detonate the reactor if he attacks, creating a stalemate. Clarke returns to Sanctum with Raven, Bellamy, Gabriel, Doucette and Cadogan and is shocked by the carnage that she discovers.
97	13	"Blood Giant"	Michael Cliett	Ross Knight	September 9, 2020	T27.14061	0.59
The Disciples eliminate Sheidheda's guards and severely wound the Dark Commander. As the search for the Flame commences, a Red Sun eclipse begins and Emori lowers Sanctum's shield so that the affected bugs will attack, killing Knight as he tries to break into the reactor; the toxin causes Gabriel to hallucinate Josephine Lightbourne who urges Gabriel to fix the Flame and use it to save humanity. Nikki attempts to take revenge on Raven, but ultimately decides to leave Raven to live with what she has done. Indra and Sheidheda work together to escape; having learned the truth about her mother's defection to Sheidheda's side, Indra decides to leave the Dark Commander to die of his wounds rather than outright killing him. Gabriel begins using Eligius technology to repair the Flame, but changes his mind and destroys it forever instead. Taking control of the situation, Clarke kills Doucette and forces Cadogan to open the anomaly to their friends and travel through with Raven, Jackson, Madi, Emori, Indra and Murphy, but Sheidheda directs Bellamy to Madi's sketchbook containing proof that she has the Commanders' memories. With Bellamy refusing to stand down, Clarke reluctantly kills her best friend and retreats through the anomaly, but is forced to leave Madi's sketchbook behind.
98	14	"A Sort of Homecoming"	Jessica Harmon	Sean Crouch	September 16, 2020	T27.14065	0.63
Clarke's group emerges in the Second Dawn Bunker where Cadogan makes his escape to Bardo; the group is reunited with their friends and Gaia who had been brought there by the Disciple who had abducted her. Clarke is forced to reveal Bellamy's death to her friends, in which Echo and Octavia consoles her. With Earth having regenerated from the death wave, Clarke destroys the Disciple helmet that could help them leave and decides to settle on Earth. The group is forced to face their various demons. On Bardo, Sheidheda makes a deal with Cadogan to rule Sanctum in exchange for bringing him Madi. The Dark Commander infiltrates the bunker, severely wounding Gabriel before being forced to flee by Indra and Gaia. Gabriel refuses medical attention and dies peacefully; unwilling to let anyone else die for her, Madi uses the Disciples' technology to travel to Bardo. Shortly thereafter, the Disciples send a bomb through the anomaly; although the blast is contained, the bunker begins to collapse.
99	15	"The Dying of the Light"	Ian Samoil	Kim Shumway	September 23, 2020	T27.14064	0.52
As Clarke struggles to come to grips with everything that has happened, Cadogan digs through Madi's mind for the code with the help of an increasingly reluctant Levitt. Levitt eventually turns on the Disciples, using the nanotracker pills left behind by Sheidheda to bring Clarke and Octavia to Bardo where the women release Sheidheda as a distraction; the Dark Commander vanishes after slaughtering several Disciples. At the same time, Emori is severely injured in a corridor collapse, forcing Raven, Murphy and Jackson to desperately search for the anomaly stone in order to get Emori back to Sanctum in order to save her life. The three locate the stone buried under an Azgeda symbol in the rec room floor, but Emori's heart stops and Jackson is forced to perform CPR as they rush Emori back to Sanctum. On Bardo, Madi is discovered to have suffered a massive and irreversible stroke from M-Cap, leaving her catatonic. Before Octavia can perform a mercy kill, Levitt discovers that Cadogan got the code from her mind and the three depart to stop him, leaving Madi behind for now; as they leave, a tear falls from Madi's eye as she remains conscious but unable to move.
100	16	"The Last War"	Jason Rothenberg	Jason Rothenberg	September 30, 2020	T27.14066	0.61
Emori dies of her injuries, but Murphy has her mind drive inserted into his own head rather than lose her despite the risks to himself. Clarke kills Cadogan as he begins the test, but fails in her own attempt at it. At the same time, Raven, Nikki and the Eligius prisoners rescue the others from the bunker and the prisoners and Wonkru hold off the Disciples to buy Clarke some time. Raven chooses to take the test herself but the Judge, a transcended being who is taking the form of Abby Griffin, feels that humanity is too violent and deserves extinction. Sheidheda provokes a battle, resulting in Levitt and Echo being mortally wounded trying to stop it. Indra kills the Dark Commander and Octavia is able to talk both sides down; as a result, humanity passes the test and everyone except for Clarke achieves Transcendence. Clarke returns to Earth with Russell's dog Picasso where the Judge, in the form of Lexa, explains that as she murdered Cadogan during the test, Clarke can never Transcend. However, Clarke's friends, aside from Madi and including Levitt, have chosen to live out their remaining days of existence in human form and settle together in peace on Earth.

== Production ==
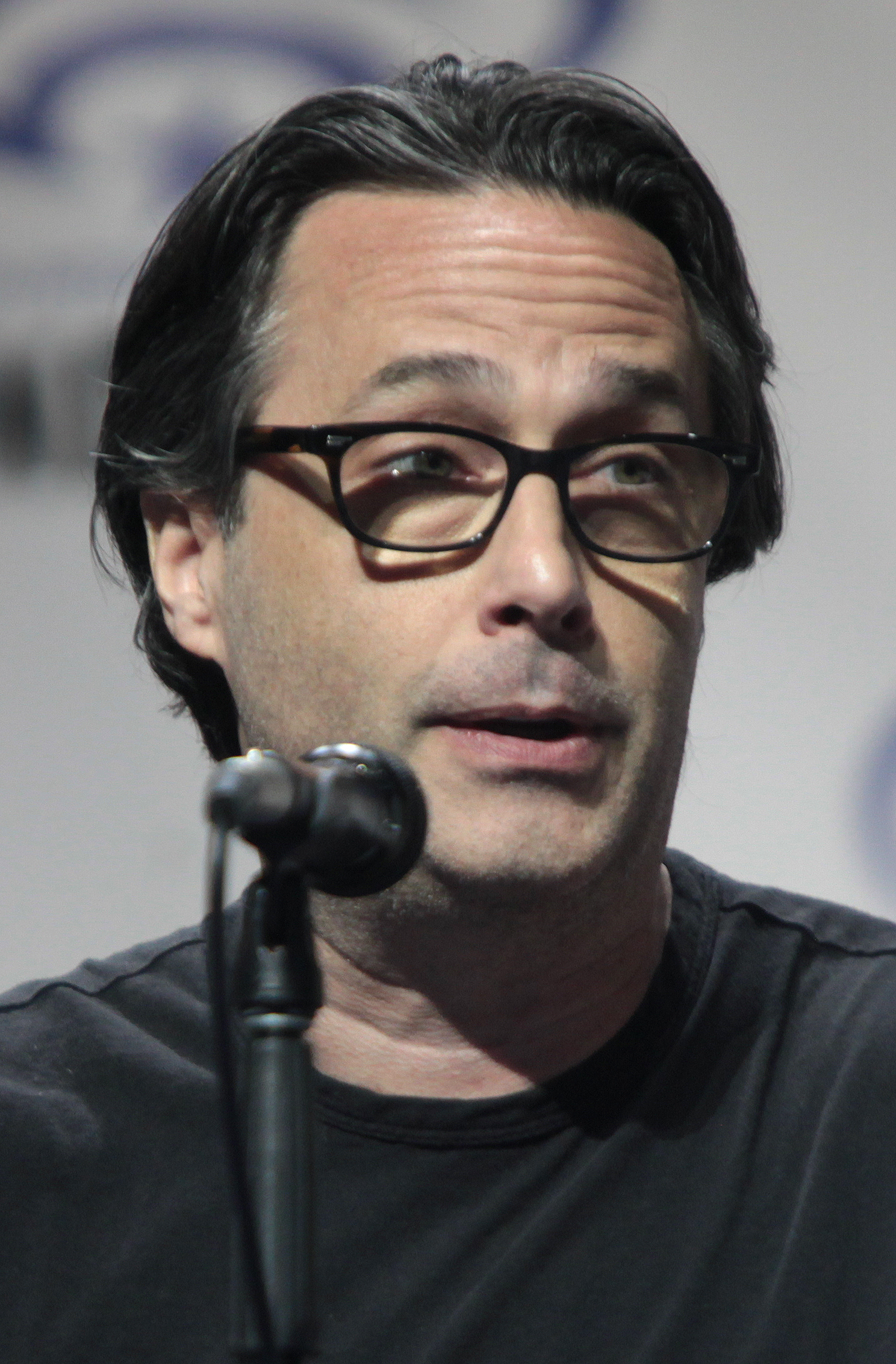
In August 2019, Jason Rothenberg announced that the show's seventh season would be its last.

On April 24, 2019, The CW renewed The 100 for a seventh season ahead of its sixth-season premiere. On August 4, 2019, it was announced by Mark Pedowitz and series developer Jason Rothenberg that the new season would be the show's last, and that it would contain sixteen episodes, to finish the series with a grand total of 100 episodes. Various cast members who had recurring roles in previous seasons of The 100 returned to star in the seventh season, including Sachin Sahel as Eric Jackson, Jarod Joseph as Nathan Miller, and Adina Porter as Indra. On September 19, 2019, Alaina Huffman was cast as Nikki, a character described as being "a bank robber and spree-killer who is both unpredictable and fierce." Additionally, on September 25, 2019, Chuku Modu was upped to series regular in the role of Gabriel Santiago. In the series finale, Paige Turco and Alycia Debnam-Carey both returned in guest appearances in the roles of Abby Griffin and Lexa, respectively.

Filming for the series finale began in Vancouver on March 4, 2020, during the COVID-19 pandemic, and concluded on March 15.

== Release ==
On March 4, 2020, it was revealed that the last season of The 100 would premiere on The CW on May 20, 2020, and that it would feature a timeslot change for the season moving from Tuesday's to Wednesday's at 8 PM ET.

== Reception ==
=== Critical response ===
On review aggregator Rotten Tomatoes, the seventh season of The 100 holds an approval rating of 100% based on 8 reviews, with an average rating of 7.5/10.

From Entertainment Weekly, Dalene Rovenstine opined that, "Overall, I'm not crazy that this very sci-fi show suddenly went supernatural/spiritual at the end. There were certainly rocky spots in this season for sure, just like the series in general. But honestly, I'm just happy that Clarke, Raven, and Octavia finally get to be happy. And I'm thankful for all the seasons we've got to spend with them." Writing for Collider, Haleigh Foutch lauded the show's characters, and their development throughout the season, stating that "Every character is forced to pull their own personal lever of sorts, placed in a position where they have to make a snap survival judgment that puts their values to the test. Some of their choices may surprise you." Linda Maleh, writing for Forbes, gave positive feedback to the season's suspenseful storyline, saying that the series helped her go through the quarantine caused by the COVID-19 pandemic, stating that "There's a new set of mysteries and stakes this season that will keep fans on the edge of their seats [...]." From CBR.com, Sam Stone also praised the series for its cast, and suspenseful story, stating that "The 100's new season hits the ground running—literally—barely giving its characters and, by extension, its audience, the chance to breathe as the stakes are raised once again."

=== Viewing figures ===
Viewership and ratings per episode of The 100 season 7
No.	Title	Air date	Rating (18–49)	Viewers (millions)	DVR (18–49)	DVR viewers (millions)	Total (18–49)	Total viewers (millions)
1	"From the Ashes"	May 20, 2020	0.2	0.80	0.3	0.59	0.5	1.39
2	"The Garden"	May 27, 2020	0.2	0.76	0.2	0.50	0.4	1.26
3	"False Gods"	June 3, 2020	0.2	0.71	0.2	0.61	0.4	1.32
4	"Hesperides"	June 10, 2020	0.2	0.63	0.2	0.53	0.4	1.16
5	"Welcome to Bardo"	June 17, 2020	0.2	0.68	0.2	0.49	0.4	1.17
6	"Nakara"	June 24, 2020	0.1	0.57	0.2	0.52	0.3	1.09
7	"The Queen's Gambit"	July 1, 2020	0.1	0.64	0.2	0.50	0.3	1.14
8	"Anaconda"	July 8, 2020	0.2	0.67	0.2	0.52	0.4	1.19
9	"The Flock"	July 15, 2020	0.2	0.61	0.2	0.50	0.4	1.11
10	"A Little Sacrifice"	August 5, 2020	0.1	0.47	0.2	0.45	0.3	0.92
11	"Etherea"	August 12, 2020	0.1	0.58	0.2	0.51	0.3	1.09
12	"The Stranger"	August 19, 2020	0.1	0.54	0.2	0.43	0.3	0.97
13	"Blood Giant"	September 9, 2020	0.2	0.59	TBD	TBD	TBD	TBD
14	"A Sort of Homecoming"	September 16, 2020	0.2	0.63	TBD	TBD	TBD	TBD
15	"The Dying of the Light"	September 23, 2020	0.1	0.52	TBD	TBD	TBD	TBD
16	"The Last War"	September 30, 2020	0.2	0.61	TBD	TBD	TBD	TBD

== Home media ==
The 100: The Complete Seventh and Final Season
Set details	Special features	
16 episodes; 3-disc set; 16:9 aspect ratio; Subtitles: English		
DVD release dates
Region 1	Region 2	Region 4
January 5, 2021	TBA	TBA
Blu-ray release dates
Region A		Region B
TBA		TBA
