= Clarke Griffin =

- The 100 character
- Eliza Taylor as Clarke Griffin in the television series The 100.
- First appearance: Literature: The 100 (2013); Television: "Pilot" (2014)
- Last appearance: Literature: The 100: Rebellion (2016); Television: "The Last War" (2020)
- Created by: Kass Morgan; Jason Rothenberg
- Portrayed by: Eliza Taylor

In-universe information
- Aliases: Prisoner 319; Television: Princess (By Bellamy Blake and Finn Collins); Wanheda ("Commander of Death"); Klark kom Skaikru ("Clarke of the Skypeople"); Fleimkepa ("Flamekeeper")
- Species: Human
- Gender: Female
- Occupation: Co-leader of The 100 (formerly); Medical student (formerly)
- Family: Novels: Dr. David Griffin (father); Dr. Mary Griffin (mother); Television: Jake Griffin (father); Dr. Abigail "Abby" Griffin (mother); Madi Griffin (adoptive daughter)
- Significant others: Novels: Wells Jaha; Bellamy Blake; Television: Finn Collins; Lexa; Niylah

Clarke Griffin is a fictional character from the post-apocalyptic young adult science fiction novel series The 100 by Kass Morgan, and the television series of the same name on The CW. She is the lead character in both the novels and the television series, where she is portrayed by Eliza Taylor. She first appears in Morgan's first novel, The 100, and in the pilot episode of the television series, as a prisoner on a space colony charged with treason. Clarke was one of the original hundred delinquents sent down to Earth to test if it was habitable after a nuclear apocalypse destroyed it almost a century prior. She becomes a leader of her people, who come into conflict with other surviving groups.

== Character ==
=== Novels ===
Clarke Griffin was born and raised in a space colony above Earth to Dr. David and Mary Griffin. She is a medical student who hopes to follow her parents' footsteps as a physician, taught by the Council's chief medical adviser Dr. Lahiri. She is also in a relationship with the colony's Chancellor's son, Wells Jaha. Clarke discovers that her parents are conducting illegal experiments on children under threat of the corrupt Vice Chancellor Rhodes. She confides in Wells, who despite swearing his secrecy, tells his father, hoping to save the Griffins from Rhodes. However, due to the lack of evidence of Rhodes' involvement, the Griffins are arrested, which also ends Clarke's relationship with Wells; Clarke assumes that her parents are executed following their arrest, leading her to hate Wells.

Two years later, the Colony decides to send one hundred of its teenage prisoners to investigate whether Earth is habitable. Among the one hundred are Clarke, Wells, Octavia Blake, her older brother Bellamy Blake, and Clarke's friend, Thalia. After arriving on Earth, Clarke and Bellamy become attracted to each other and eventually develop a friendship while co-leading the 100 with Wells.

Eventually, someone sets fires to their camp, ultimately they discover that they are not alone on Earth. The 100 captured an Earth-born girl, Sasha Walgrove, and she reveals there are people from the Colony who arrived before the 100. Clarke eventually meets Sasha's father, Max, who is a leader of an underground colony underneath the ruins of Mount Weather Emergency Operations Center. Max reveals that he helped Clarke's parents two years ago, and thus are two of the people sent by the Colony to test Earth's environments before Clarke's, giving her hope that they are still alive. She also discovers that Wells and Bellamy are paternal half-brothers after Wells realizes that Bellamy is his father's secret son from a previous relationship, surprised of knowing that after breaking up with Wells she ends up having a courtship with his sibling.

After drop ships from the Colony arrive, Vice Chancellor Rhodes attempts to take control over the community Clarke built with Bellamy and Wells on Earth. With Sasha's help, Clarke, Wells, and Bellamy escape, but Sasha is killed when she tries to help Octavia. As Mount Weather's and Rhodes' forces battle, Clarke, Bellamy, and Wells are captured during the initial exchange, but their allies defeat and capture Rhodes before he can execute the trio.

During Sasha's funeral, Clarke reunites with her parents and reconciles with Wells, since her parents are actually alive, but will not resume their past relationship because she is now in love with Bellamy, whom she felt happier to be with than when she was with Wells. Later, Clarke and Bellamy lead a rescue effort to save members of their community who are kidnapped by cultists who call themselves the Protectors. After succeeding in their mission, Bellamy asks Clarke to marry him, which she accepts.

=== Television ===
==== Background ====
Clarke was born in the year of 2131 in October and raised on the Ark to Jake and Abigail Griffin. Before her imprisonment, Clarke's father discovered that the Ark space station was running out of oxygen, and had an estimated 6 months' worth left. He shared this information with Clarke and planned to reveal his findings with the larger community against the Chancellor's orders, only to have Abigail report him. He was later 'floated', a form of execution where one is ejected into space. Clarke, who was under the age of 18 and therefore not subject to capital punishment, was imprisoned for acting as his accomplice. Because of her status of prisoner she was considered to be expendable by the council and was volunteered by her mother to be sent down to Earth to test the air to see if it was livable again with 99 other delinquents, including Wells, Octavia, Jasper, Monty, and Finn. Bellamy Blake unsuccessfully attempted to assassinate Chancellor Jaha, but it worked as a distraction to help him sneak onto the space ship being sent down to earth.

==== Storyline ====
In the first season, Clarke and the other 99 delinquents are sent down in an exodus ship which crash lands after Earth's atmosphere cuts all communication and nearly fries the ship. After the ship lands Clarke soon realizes that they landed in the wrong location. They were originally aimed for the Mount Weather complex, a quarantine zone that had food and supplies, only to find out that they landed in the forest miles away. After establishing a camping ground, Clark serves as a leader of her group alongside Bellamy, as well as a medic due to her limited medical knowledge gained from her mother. Clarke begins a relationship with Finn Collins, another delinquent from the ark, only to be heartbroken after she meets Finn's girlfriend Raven. Finn later dies after Clarke stabs him in a mercy killing that prevents him from getting tortured by the Grounders.

In the third season, Clarke returns to take a leading role in the war against A.L.I.E., the AI that caused the nuclear apocalypse that destroyed the world. Clarke ends up losing Lexa, the commander of the Grounders and Clarke's lover, while many of her family and friends fall under the AI's control. In the season finale, Clarke uses a transfusion of Nightblood from Ontari of the Grounders in order to take possession of a device known as the Flame, which is the A.L.I.E. 2.0 AI, in order to face A.L.I.E. in the City of Light. With the help of the consciousness of Lexa and A.L.I.E.'s creator Becca manifesting through the Flame, Clarke confronts and destroys A.L.I.E. using her kill switch. However, A.L.I.E. reveals that her actions have been meant to save humanity from a second nuclear apocalypse caused by the nuclear power plants around the world beginning to melt down. Clarke nevertheless destroys the AI, but believes her warnings about the threat.

In the fourth season, Clarke attempts to save as many people as she can from the coming death wave as predicted by A.L.I.E. and confirmed by Raven Reyes. As part of this, Clarke allows herself to be the recipient of a bone marrow transplant as a test subject to see if Nightblood can be recreated. However, her mother stops the testing, fearing for Clarke's life and she is left unsure if she can survive the coming radiation or not. With 1,200 survivors in a massive fallout bunker, Clarke and several of her friends attempt to escape to the remains of the Ark in space as an alternate means of survival. Clarke remains behind to power up the Ark remotely, missing her chance to escape as the death wave arrives. Six years later, Clarke's Nightblood is revealed to have saved her from the death wave and she has adopted a young Nightblood named Madi, the only other survivor Clarke could find on the planet. As Clarke continues to attempt to communicate with her friends without success from Shallow Valley, the only inhabitable part of Earth left, a prison transport ship arrives.

In the fifth season, Clarke has to juggle dealing with the Eligius IV prisoners, raising Madi, the return of her friends who have changed and the war between Wonkru and the prisoners. With Madi becoming the new Commander after taking the Flame, Clarke kills McCreary, the leader of the prisoners, but not before he launches the Damocles bomb at Shallow Valley as an act of scorched earth. Everyone manages to escape to Eligius IV in orbit where it is determined that it will take at least ten years before the Earth is habitable again. Along with everyone else, Clarke enters cryo sleep, only to emerge with Bellamy 125 years later, greeted by Jordan, the son of Monty and Harper. From Monty's video logs, Clarke and Bellamy learn of their friend's life on the ship and how Earth ultimately remained completely uninhabitable leading Monty to direct the ship to a new habitable world. Looking out over their new home world, Clarke expresses hope that they will get it right this time.

In the sixth season, Clarke tries to negotiate for a home for her people with the people of the habitable moon Sanctum. However, the leaders of the society, the Primes, are the original mission team who keep reincarnating themselves by implanting drives holding their consciousness into new Nightblood hosts, similar to the Flame. Desperate to get their daughter Josephine back, the rulers of Sanctum implant Clarke with her Mind Drive, allowing Josephine to possess Clarke's body while the process is stated to wipe the host's mind, effectively killing Clarke. Its later revealed that Clarke survived the process and is trapped within her own mind. Clarke discovers that she still possesses part of A.L.I.E. within her which protected Clarke's mind. With the help of a manifestation of Monty, she attempts to regain control of her body. Though she fails, she manages to take control of one finger and use it to discreetly send Bellamy, who had since learned what happened to her, a message using Morse code that she is still alive. Bellamy quickly grasps the significance of Clarke's message and informs Nathan Miller, planning to get her back. At the same time, Josephine informs her parents and claims to know how to get rid of Clarke's consciousness for good. With Russell wanting to restore Clarke instead, Josephine plots behind his back but is abducted by Clarke's friends in an effort to save her with just over a day left before the strain kills Clarke. The situation causes Clarke and Josephine's minds to begin merging somewhat, granting each access to some of the other's knowledge. After the Children of Gabriel attempt to execute her, Josephine relinquishes control to Clarke to save their lives who begins seeing a manifestation of Josephine communicating with her in the waking world. Clarke then sets out to find Gabriel Santiago to get rid of Josephine for good. The two bond while working together to survive and Clarke expresses hope that Gabriel can save them both. Though Gabriel removes the Mind Drive, Josephine is able to hang on to Clarke's body using A.L.I.E.'s neural mesh as Clarke's mind had. With no other choice, Clarke destroys Josephine for good and is reunited with her friends at long last. Posing as Josephine, Clarke helps to overthrow the Primes, but loses her mother in the process.

In the seventh season, Clarke's dreams of a peaceful new life on Sanctum are disrupted by the mounting tensions between the various factions, the resurrection of the Dark Commander in Russell's body and the disappearance of several of her friends due to a new faction called the Disciples who target Clarke specifically as they believe that she has the Key that they need to start the Last War. After Raven discovers that the mysterious Anomaly is in fact a wormhole linking six different planets together, Clarke leads a group to search for and rescue their missing friends. Eventually tracking the Disciples to Bardo, Clarke discovers that their leader is Bill Cadogan, the founder of the Second Dawn doomsday cult that built the bunker on Earth that Wonkru survived in, and that Bellamy is apparently dead. The Key is revealed to be the Flame which the Disciples think that Clarke has due to seeing Octavia's memories of A.L.I.E.'s destruction. Clarke leverages this belief against the Disciples, but the situation escalates when Echo tries to commit genocide and Bellamy returns alive and betrays his friends due to a newfound belief in the Disciple cause, revealing the Flame's destruction. After Bellamy discovers that Madi has the memories of the Commanders, Clarke reluctantly kills him in an attempt to protect her daughter and strands her friends on a regenerated Earth in an attempt to protect the remaining people that she loves. An attack by Sheidheda causes Madi to turn herself over to Cadogan. By the time Clarke finds Madi again, Cadogan has gotten what he needs from Madi's mind and causes her to suffer a massive and irreversible stroke in the process, completely paralyzing her.

In the series finale, a grief-stricken and vengeful Clarke murders Cadogan as he starts the test to determine if humanity is worthy of Transcendence or not. The Judge tests Clarke in Cadogan's place and determines that humanity should be annihilated. As Clarke rushes to Madi's side, Raven appeals the decision and convinces the Judge to change her mind. The human race Transcends and Clarke convinces Madi to join them as it is Madi's only chance of survival. Clarke is left as the sole human to not Transcend and returns to Earth after collecting Russell's dog Picasso from Sanctum. The Judge, taking on the form of Lexa, explains to Clarke that her murder of Cadogan during the test means that Clarke can never Transcend. However, Clarke's surviving friends and Octavia's new boyfriend Levitt choose to return to human form and live out their lives together on Earth. Madi chooses not to return as she knows that Clarke would not want Madi to return to a world where she'd have no one her own age to love, but the Judge assures Clarke that her daughter is happy and will never age or die in her ascended state.

== Casting and development ==
On 1 March 2013, it was announced that Taylor had been cast as lead character Clarke Griffin. On how she got the part in the series, Taylor said:

I didn't actually audition. I'd been living in LA for about a month and my credit card was stolen and all my money was taken – spent at Home Depot, which was great – and I was ready to pack my bags and go back to Australia because I didn't know how I was going to survive in LA any longer and then I got a call from my manager to say that an audition I'd done months ago for a film had been looked at by the producers of this TV show called The 100 and they wanted me to go in for a reading the next day. So I read the script that night and loved it and went in for the meeting the next day and got the role. Before I knew it I was on a plane to Vancouver to shoot the pilot and my whole life changed.

In 2015, it was confirmed that, unlike in the novels, Clarke in the television series is bisexual, marked by her kiss with Lexa in the second season. Clarke is the first lead character on The CW to be LGBT.

== Reception ==
In his review of the second season, IGN's Eric Goldman praised the developments between Clarke and Lexa, and deemed Taylor's performance "excellent" for "showing Clarke's tremendous amount of inner strength and natural leadership skills, as she was forced to make calls that always came with a huge price." Clarke was placed in BuzzFeed's "29 amazingly Badass Female characters of 2015 and third on Tell-Tale's 5 "TV Heroes Who Crushed It" in 2015.
