= Bury your gays =

Trope in fiction

"Bury your gays" or "dead lesbian syndrome" is a trope in the media portrayal of LGBTQ people in which queer characters face tragic fates, including death, much more often than straight characters. This reflection of widespread homophobia drew mainstream attention in the 2010s through publicized examples such as the death of the character Lexa in The 100 television series. The controversy and discussion resulting from these examples led some creators of popular fiction to consciously avoid harmful tropes and present more positive portrayals of LGBTQ characters.

== Prevalence ==
Across media, gay or lesbian characters tend to meet unhappy endings such as heartbreak, loss, insanity, depression or imprisonment. In many cases, they end up dying, either through suicide, homophobic attacks, illness or other means. Viewers have called this trope "bury your gays" and "dead lesbian syndrome". "Bury your gays" has been linked to TV shows, books, and other character-driven works profiting off of queer coding characters without having to commit to a queer storyline, especially as many partners to killed-off queer characters find themselves in "endgame" heteronormative relationships. In fact, many queer characters are killed off quickly after performing an act that aligns with their queer identity. Afterwards, their respective partners often backtrack, playing off the interaction as an experiment or temporary lapse in judgement.

=== In television ===
This happens especially often in television shows. According to Autostraddle, which examined 1,779 scripted U.S. television series from 1976 to 2016, 11% (193) of them featured lesbian or bisexual female characters, and among these, 35% saw lesbian or bisexual characters dead, while only 16% provided a happy ending for them. Similarly, among all lesbian or bisexual characters in ended series, 31% ended up dead, and only 10% received a happy ending. In a study of 242 character deaths in the 2015–2016 television season, Vox reported that "A full 10 percent of deaths [were] queer women." In one month of 2016, four lesbian or bisexual women were killed in four shows, further showcasing the prevalence of this occurrence on screen. Such statistics led Variety to conclude in 2016 that "the trope is alive and well on TV, and fictional lesbian and bisexual women in particular have a very small chance of leading long and productive lives".

GLAAD's 2016 TV report stated:

While much improvement has been made and TV remains incredibly far ahead of film in terms of LGBTQ representation, it must be made clear that television – and broadcast series more specifically – failed queer women this year as character after character was killed. This is especially disappointing as this very report just last year called on broadcast content creators to do better by lesbian and bisexual women after superfluous deaths on Chicago Fire and Supernatural. This continues a decades-long trend of killing LGBTQ characters – often solely to further a straight, cisgender character's plotline – which sends a dangerous message to audiences. It is important that creators do not reinvigorate harmful tropes, which exploit an already marginalized community.

In some cases, burying queer characters can be a survival mechanism for a show as shows with queer storylines can be subject to cancellation as executives believe there would otherwise not be a large enough audience to continue. This is phenomenon is known as "cancelling your gays," in which cancellation of TV shows disproportionately affects shows with queer themes and characters.

=== In video games ===
LGBTQ characters also go through similar things in other fiction, such as video games, where, according to Kotaku, they are "largely defined by a pain that their straight counterparts do not share". Facing challenges that "serve as an in-world analogy for anti-LGBTQ bigotry", these characters are defined by tragedies which deny them a chance at happiness.

The climaxes of the games Life Is Strange (2015) and The Last of Us: Left Behind, both praised for their prominently queer female leads, feature the death of those character's love interests. Reviewing The Last of Us Part II, reviewer Steve Wright notes the franchise's use of minority characters "as shortcuts for you to empathize with and feel bad for when torture porn is then immediately heaped upon them".

== Response ==
The death of Lexa in the CW's The 100 sparked viewer outrage and widespread controversy, becoming one of the first deaths to draw mainstream attention. Fans took to the internet to voice their frustrations and spearheaded initiatives to help bring about change. The 100 showrunner Jason Rothenberg later admitted to his mistake of perpetuating the trope, stating: "I would've done some things differently."

In an attempt to combat this, the writers of the show Saving Hope, in collaboration with LGBTQ activist organization The Trevor Project, established the Lexa Pledge, a plea to showrunners and TV writers to do better by their LGBTQ characters. The pledge details numerous ways that writers can better represent the LGBTQ community by providing queer characters with meaningful storylines and to avoid killing them off to forward the plot of a straight character. The pledge was met with support with writers from shows like The Catch and Rookie Blue signing the pledge.

However, some showrunners, most notably Grey's Anatomy showrunner Krista Vernoff, acknowledged the importance of the pledge in raising awareness but felt it could limit storytelling abilities and halt progress in terms of onscreen representations of queer characters. When the final season of She-Ra and the Princesses of Power premiered in 2020, showrunner ND Stevenson said that he could not "see another gay character die on TV for the moment. Maybe one day we can have a tragic gay romance again, but that has been, like, the only norm for so long."

Increasing awareness and criticism of the trope has influenced creators to attempt to avoid it. In 2018, Star Trek: Discovery aired an episode in which a gay character played by Wilson Cruz was killed. Immediately after the episode aired, Cruz, GLAAD, and the showrunners released reassuring statements intimating that the character's death may not be final, with specific reference to avoiding the cliché. In the following season, Cruz's character returned from the dead by science-fictional means, and Cruz was added to the main cast.

Elsewhere, Schitt's Creek writer and creator Dan Levy acknowledged that he wanted the relationship between David and Patrick to steer clear of tragedy and heartbreak in an open response to the growing trend of unhappy queer characters across the media landscape. Cast members of the show Yellowjackets were relieved to hear that the show chose to avoid the killing or mistreating of LGBT characters unfairly and were willing to take a stand to ensure the appropriate treatment of the onscreen queer characters.

Fans also flocked to social media with the hashtag #LGBTfansdeservebetter to voice their opinions and arguing that queer representation had been less than satisfactory, alongside irresponsible management of queer characters and storylines by TV executives.

== Origin ==
The "bury your gays" trope originated in the late 19th century, with figures such as Oscar Wilde, who pioneered queer representation in English literature in The Picture of Dorian Gray. At the time, sodomy was considered a sin and was punishable in a court of law, and the instance of a queer identity, despite a tragic ending, was a form of rebellion and pushed back against heteronormative societal pressures. Despite using the trope as a form of refuge and in work deriving from aestheticism, both the book and Wilde were decried for sodomy, and the book was used in the trial against Wilde in which he was imprisoned.

== Related tropes ==
A related trope is "fridging", in which the suffering or death of female characters in media is used as a plot device to motivate their (traditionally male) love interests.

Slacktivism in terms of queer representation in media is also seen with queer coding or "token gay" characters rather than developed, outright representation.
