= Jessica Sharpe =

Jessica Sharpe may refer to:

- Jessica Sharpe, character in Body Politic (TV pilot)
- Jessica Sharpe, contestant on The Voice (U.S. season 3)
