= The 100 (TV series) =

2014 American science fiction television series

- Genre: Action; Drama; Dystopian; Post-apocalyptic; Science fiction
- Based on: The 100 by Kass Morgan
- Developed by: Jason Rothenberg
- Showrunner: Jason Rothenberg
- Starring: Eliza Taylor; Paige Turco; Thomas McDonell; Eli Goree; Marie Avgeropoulos; Bob Morley; Kelly Hu; Christopher Larkin; Devon Bostick; Isaiah Washington; Henry Ian Cusick; Lindsey Morgan; Ricky Whittle; Richard Harmon; Zach McGowan; Tasya Teles; Shannon Kook; JR Bourne; Chuku Modu; Shelby Flannery
- Theme music composer: Evan Frankfort; Liz Phair
- Composers: Evan Frankfort; Marc Dauer; Liz Phair; Tree Adams
- Country of origin: United States
- Original language: English
- No. of seasons: 7
- No. of episodes: 100 (list of episodes)

Production
- Executive producers: Jason Rothenberg; Leslie Morgenstein; Bruce Miller; Matt Miller; Gina Girolamo; Bharat Nalluri; Elizabeth Craft; Sarah Fain; Cheryl Dolans; Dean White; Kim Shumway; Ed Fraiman; Jeff Vlaming
- Producers: Jae Marchant; Tim Scanlan; Aaron Ginsburg; Wade McIntyre; T.J. Brady; Rasheed Newson; Kira Snyder; Kim Shumway; Heidi Cole McAdams; Miranda Kwok; Alyssa Clark; Georgia Lee; Charles Lyle
- Production locations: Vancouver, British Columbia
- Running time: 39–44 minutes
- Production companies: Alloy Entertainment; CBS Television Studios; Warner Bros. Television; Bonanza Productions

Original release
- Network: The CW
- Release: March 19, 2014 – September 30, 2020

The 100 (pronounced "The Hundred") is an American post-apocalyptic science fiction drama television series that premiered on March 19, 2014, on the CW network, and ended on September 30, 2020. Developed by Jason Rothenberg, the series is based on the young adult novel series The 100 by Kass Morgan. The 100 follows descendants of post-apocalyptic survivors from a space habitat, the Ark, who return to Earth nearly a century after a devastating nuclear apocalypse; the first people sent to Earth are a group of juvenile delinquents who encounter another group of survivors on the ground.

The juvenile delinquents include Clarke Griffin (Eliza Taylor), Finn Collins (Thomas McDonell), Bellamy Blake (Bob Morley), Octavia Blake (Marie Avgeropoulos), Jasper Jordan (Devon Bostick), Monty Green (Christopher Larkin), and John Murphy (Richard Harmon). Other lead characters include Clarke's mother Dr. Abby Griffin (Paige Turco), Marcus Kane (Henry Ian Cusick), and Chancellor Thelonious Jaha (Isaiah Washington), all of whom are council members on the Ark, and Raven Reyes (Lindsey Morgan), a mechanic aboard the Ark.

== Plot ==
Ninety-seven years after a devastating nuclear apocalypse wipes out most human life on Earth, thousands of people now live in a space station orbiting Earth, which they call the Ark. Three generations have been born in space, but when life-support systems on the Ark begin to fail, one hundred juvenile detainees are sent to Earth in a last attempt to determine whether it is habitable, or at least save resources for the remaining residents of the Ark. They discover that some humans survived the apocalypse: the Grounders, who live in clans locked in a power struggle; the Reapers, another group of grounders who have been turned into cannibals by the Mountain Men; and the Mountain Men, who live in Mount Weather, descended from those who locked themselves away before the apocalypse. Under the leadership of Clarke and Bellamy, the juveniles attempt to survive the harsh surface conditions, battle hostile grounders and establish communication with the Ark.

In the second season, the survivors face a new threat from the Mountain Men, who harvest their bone marrow to survive the radiation. Clarke and the others form a fragile alliance with the grounders to rescue their people. The season ends with Clarke making a devastating choice to save them all.

In season three, power struggles erupt between the Arkadians and the grounders after a controversial new leader takes charge. Meanwhile, an AI named A.L.I.E., responsible for the original apocalypse, takes control of people's minds. Clarke destroys A.L.I.E. but learns another disaster is imminent.

In the fourth season, nuclear reactors are melting down, threatening to wipe out life again. Clarke and her friends search for ways to survive, including experimenting with radiation-resistant blood and finding an underground bunker. As time runs out, only a select few are able to take shelter.

The fifth season picks up six years later, when Earth is left largely uninhabitable except for one green valley, where new enemies arrive. Clarke protects her adopted daughter Madi while former survivors return from space and underground, triggering another war. The battle ends with the valley destroyed and the group entering cryosleep to find a new home.

In season six, the group awakens 125 years later on a new planet called Sanctum, ruled by powerful families known as the Primes. Clarke fights to stop body-snatching rituals and protect her people from new threats, including a rebel group and a dangerous AI influence. The season ends with major losses and the destruction of the Primes' rule.

In the seventh and final season, the survivors face unrest on Sanctum and clash with a mysterious group called the Disciples, who believe Clarke is key to saving humanity. A wormhole network reveals multiple planets and a final "test" that determines the fate of the species. All of humanity transcends into a higher consciousness, but when Clarke cannot transcend, her friends choose to return to Earth and live out the rest of their lives with her.

== Cast and characters ==
- Eliza Taylor as Clarke Griffin (Note: Taylor also portrays Josephine Lightbourne VIII in season six.)
- Paige Turco as Abigail "Abby" Griffin (seasons 1–6; guest season 7) (Note: Turco also portrays Simone Lightbourne VII in season six and the Judge in season seven.)
- Thomas McDonell as Finn Collins (seasons 1–2) (Note: McDonnell was credited as main cast for the first nine episodes of season two.)
- Eli Goree as Wells Jaha (season 1; guest season 2) (Note: Goree was credited as main cast for the first three episodes of season one.)
- Marie Avgeropoulos as Octavia Blake
- Bob Morley as Bellamy Blake (Note: Morley was credited as main cast for the first 13 episodes of the seventh season; however, he appeared in only six of them.)
- Kelly Hu as Callie "Cece" Cartwig (season 1) (Note: Hu was credited as main cast only in the pilot.)
- Christopher Larkin as Monty Green (seasons 1–5; guest season 6)
- Devon Bostick as Jasper Jordan (seasons 1–4) (Note: Bostick was credited as main cast for the first 11 episodes of season 4; however, he only appeared in 7 of them.)
- Isaiah Washington as Thelonious Jaha (seasons 1–5) (Note: Washington was credited as main cast for the first 2 episodes of season 5; however, he only appeared in episode 2 of that season.)
- Henry Ian Cusick as Marcus Kane (seasons 1–6) (Note: Cusick was credited as main cast in the first 9 episodes of season 6; however, he only appeared in 3 of them.)
- Lindsey Morgan as Raven Reyes (seasons 2–7; recurring season 1)
- Ricky Whittle as Lincoln (seasons 2–3; recurring season 1) (Note: Whittle was credited as main cast in the first 9 episodes and episode 12 in season 3.)
- Richard Harmon as John Murphy (seasons 3–7; recurring seasons 1–2)
- Zach McGowan as Roan (season 4; recurring season 3; guest season 7) (Note: McGowan was credited as main cast in the first 10 episodes of season four.)
- Tasya Teles as Echo / Ash (seasons 5–7; guest seasons 2–3; recurring season 4)
- Shannon Kook as Jordan Green (seasons 6–7; guest season 5)
- JR Bourne as Russell Lightbourne / Malachi / Sheidheda (season 7; recurring season 6) (Note: Bourne also portrayed Russell Lightbourne VII in seasons six and in a recurring capacity, while Sheidheda was originally portrayed by co-star Dakota Daulby.)
- Chuku Modu as Gabriel Santiago (season 7; recurring season 6)
- Shelby Flannery as Hope Diyoza (season 7; guest season 6)

== Episodes ==
The 100 premiered on March 19, 2014. On May 8, 2014, the CW renewed The 100 for a second season, which premiered on October 22, 2014. On January 11, 2015, the CW renewed the series for a third season, which premiered on January 21, 2016. On March 12, 2016, The 100 was renewed for a fourth season of 13 episodes, which premiered on February 1, 2017. On March 10, 2017, the CW renewed the series for a fifth season, which premiered on April 24, 2018. On May 9, 2018, The 100 was renewed for a sixth season, which premiered on April 30, 2019. On April 24, 2019, the CW renewed the series for a seventh season, that would consist of 16 episodes and premiered on May 20, 2020. In August 2019, it was announced the seventh season would serve as the final season of the series, concluding the show with a total of 100 episodes across all seven seasons. The series concluded on September 30, 2020.

Season	Episodes	Originally released		Rank	Viewers (millions)
Season	Episodes	First released	Last released	Rank	Viewers (millions)
1	13	March 19, 2014	June 11, 2014	150	2.59
2	16	October 22, 2014	March 11, 2015	157	2.46
3	16	January 21, 2016	May 19, 2016	165	1.94
4	13	February 1, 2017	May 24, 2017	158	1.47
5	13	April 24, 2018	August 7, 2018	182	1.61
6	13	April 30, 2019	August 6, 2019	165	1.30
7	16	May 20, 2020	September 30, 2020	TBA	TBA

== Production ==
=== Filming ===
Filming for the series took place in and around Vancouver, British Columbia, Canada. Production on the pilot occurred during the second quarter of 2013. After the show received a series order, filming for the first season occurred between August 2013 and January 2014. Filming for the second season began on July 7, 2014, and concluded on January 23, 2015. The third season was filmed between July 15, 2015, and February 2, 2016. Filming for the fourth season began on August 2, 2016, and concluded on January 18, 2017. Filming for the fifth season began on August 14, 2017, and finished on January 27, 2018. Filming for the sixth season began on August 27, 2018, and concluded on February 8, 2019. Filming for the seventh season began on August 26, 2019, and concluded on March 14, 2020.

Post-production work, including ADR recording for the series, was done at the Cherry Beach Sound recording studio. David J. Peterson, who created Dothraki and Valyrian for Game of Thrones, developed the Trigedasleng language for The Grounders. Jason Rothenberg said it was similar to Creole English. The language is called "Trig" on the show. After his constructed language work on Star-Crossed, Peterson was contacted by the producers of The 100 to create a language for the Grounders, an evolution of English. In the setting, 97 years have passed since the apocalypse, which is a very short time for significant language change. Because of this, Peterson posited an accelerated evolution in which the early Grounders used a cant specifically to obfuscate their speech and to differentiate between friend or foe. Trigedasleng derives from that cant and evolved over several short generations of survivors of the apocalypse.

On March 12, 2020, Warner Bros. Television shut down production on all of their shows due to the COVID-19 pandemic, however, writer Kim Shumway confirmed they were able to complete filming for their seventh season.

=== Casting ===
In late February 2013, Bob Morley and Eli Goree were cast as Bellamy Blake and Wells Jaha, respectively, followed a day later by the casting of Henry Ian Cusick as Marcus Kane. Less than a week later, Eliza Taylor and Marie Avgeropoulos were cast in co-starring roles as Clarke Griffin and Octavia Blake, respectively. Throughout March, the rest of the cast was filled out, with Paige Turco cast as Abigail Walters (now Abigail Griffin), Isaiah Washington as Chancellor Jaha, Thomas McDonnell as Finn Collins, Kelly Hu as Callie Cartwig, and Christopher Larkin as Monty Green. For the second season, Adina Porter and Raymond J. Barry were cast in recurring roles as Indra and Dante Wallace, respectively, along with Alycia Debnam-Carey as Lexa.

== Broadcast ==
In Canada, Season 1 of The 100 was licensed exclusively to Netflix. The series premiered on March 20, 2014, the day after the mid-season premiere of Season 1 on the CW.

In New Zealand, the series premiered on TVNZ's on-demand video streaming service on March 21, 2014.

In the UK and Ireland, The 100 premiered on E4 on July 7, 2014. The first episode was viewed by an average audience of 1.39 million, making it the channel's biggest ever program launch. Season 2 premiered on January 6, 2015, and averaged 1,118,000 viewers. Season 3 premiered on February 17, 2016.

In Australia, The 100 was originally scheduled to premiere on Go! but instead premiered on Fox8 on September 4, 2014. Season 2 premiered on January 8, 2015.

== Home media ==
Warner Home Entertainment released the first five seasons' DVDs, and the first season's Blu-ray while the remaining five seasons' Blu-rays were released through Warner Archive Collection who also released a manufacture-on-demand DVD for the sixth and seventh seasons.

Home media releases of The 100
Season	Episodes	DVD			Blu-ray		Features
Season	Episodes	Region 1	Region 2	Region 4	Region A	Region B	Features
1	13	September 23, 2014	September 29, 2014	December 3, 2014	September 23, 2014	December 3, 2014	Creating the World of The 100; Commentary on "We Are Grounders, Part 2"
2	16	October 13, 2015	October 12, 2015	October 14, 2015	October 13, 2015	October 14, 2015	The 100: Unlocking the Mountain; The 100 Pre-Viz Stunts featurette
3	16	July 19, 2016	September 26, 2016	September 28, 2016	July 19, 2016	September 28, 2016	A Short Lived Victory: Unlocking the Season 3 Finale; Arkadia: From Wreckage to Salvation; Ice Nation: Brutal and Fierce; Wanheda: Clarke's Journey; Polis: Capital of the Grounders; The 100 Pre-Viz Stunts Season 3
4	13	July 19, 2017	July 24, 2017	October 4, 2017	July 18, 2017	October 4, 2017	Deleted Scenes, From Outcasts to Leaders, Creating a Post-Apocalyptic World; The 100: Jasper's Journey; Battle Tested: The 100 Season 4 Stunts, Gag Reel; The 100: 2016 Comic-Con Panel
5	13	October 9, 2018	October 8, 2018	October 10, 2018	November 27, 2018	October 10, 2018	Redemption and Rebirth; 2018 WonderCon Panel; Gag Reel
6	13	November 12, 2019	November 25, 2019	November 27, 2019	November 12, 2019	November 27, 2019	The 100 Season 6: Highlights from 2019 WonderCon
7	16	January 5, 2021	May 6, 2021	January 6, 2021	January 5, 2021	January 6, 2021	None

== Reception ==
=== Critical response ===
Critical response of The 100
Season	Rotten Tomatoes	Metacritic
1	76% (37 reviews)	64 (34 reviews)
2	100% (11 reviews)	—N/a
3	83% (12 reviews)	—N/a
4	93% (14 reviews)	—N/a
5	100% (13 reviews)	—N/a
6	100% (10 reviews)	—N/a
7	100% (8 reviews)	—N/a

On Rotten Tomatoes, the show holds a 93 percent average approval rating across its seven seasons.

Its first season has a 76 percent approval rating based on 37 reviews, with an average score of 6.98/10. The site's consensus reads: "Although flooded with stereotypes, the suspenseful atmosphere helps make The 100 a rare high-concept guilty pleasure." On Metacritic, the first season scores 63 out of 100 points, based on 26 critics, indicating "generally favorable reviews". In an early negative review of the first season, Brian Lowry of The Boston Globe said: "Our attraction to Apocalypse TV runs deep, as our culture plays out different futuristic possibilities. That's still no reason to clone material, nor is it a reason to deliver characters who are little more than stereotypes." At the start of the series, Allison Keene of The Hollywood Reporter said the show "has a lot of interesting things to play with in terms of its narrative and world-building, but it chooses to gloss over them", presenting "The CW's ultimate vision for humanity: an Earth populated only by attractive teenagers, whose parents are left out in space." Kelly West of Cinema Blend gave it a more favorable review, noting: "It takes a little while for the series to warm up, but when The 100 begins to hit its stride, a unique and compelling drama begins to emerge." IGN's editor Eric Goldman also gave the show a positive review, writing: "Overcoming most of its early growing pains pretty quickly, The 100 was a very strong show by the end of its first season."

The second season was met with mostly positive reviews and holds a rating of 100 percent on Rotten Tomatoes based on 11 reviews, with an average score of 8.77/10. The site's consensus reads: "The 100 hones all of the things that make it tick for a dynamic second season complete with fast-paced storylines, vivid visuals, and interesting characters to root for – or against." In a review of the second-season finale, Kyle Fowle of The A.V. Club said, "Very few shows manage to really push the boundaries of moral compromise in a way that feels legitimately difficult. [...] The 100 has done the same, presenting a finale that doesn't shy away from the morally complex stakes it's spent a whole season building up." Maureen Ryan of The Huffington Post, wrote: "I've rarely seen a program demonstrate the kind of consistency and thematic dedication that The 100 has shown in its first two seasons. This is a show about moral choices and the consequences of those choices, and it's been laudably committed to those ideas from Day 1." IGN's Eric Goldman said the second season "elevated the series into the upper echelon, as the show become one of the coolest and most daring series on TV these days". In Variety, Ryan named The 100 one of the best shows of 2015.

The third season received an overall rating of 83 percent based on 12 reviews, with an average rating of 7.29/10. The critical consensus is, "The 100 goes macro in season 3, skillfully expanding the literal scope of the setting and figurative moral landscape." Variety's Maureen Ryan stated in an early review of the season: "The show is more politically complicated than ever, and the world-building that accompanies the depiction of various factions, alliances and conflicts is generally admirable." In a review of the third-season finale, Mariya Karimjee of Vulture wrote: "Every moment of this finale is pitch-perfect: the choreography of the fight scenes, the plotting and pacing, and the stunning way in which the episode finally reaches it apex. [The episode] elevates the season's themes and pulls together its disparate story lines, setting us up nicely for season four." In his review of the finale and the season overall, Fowle of The A.V. Club stated: "This has been a rocky season. The first half of it was defined by shoddy character motivations and oversized villains. The second half has done some work to bring the show back from the brink, [...] paying off with "a thrilling, forward-thinking finale that provides some necessary closure to this season."

The fourth season received a 93 percent on Rotten Tomatoes, with an average rating of 8.22/10 based on 14 reviews. The site's consensus reads, "Season 4 of The 100 rewards longtime viewers with a deeper look at their favorite characters, as well as adding exceptional nuance and depth to their thrilling circumstances." The latter half of the fourth season received better reception than the first, with the episodes "Die All, Die Merrily" and "Praimfaya" often cited as the best episodes of the season. "Die All, Die Merrily" has a 9.5/10 rating from IGN, a 5/5 rating from Vulture, and an A rating from The AV Club. "Praimfaya" has a 9.0/10 from IGN and an A rating from The AV Club.

On Rotten Tomatoes, the fifth season has a 100 percent with an average of 8.31/10, based on 13 reviews. The site's consensus is, "Five years in, The 100 manages to top itself once again with a audacious, addicting season." In a 4.5/5 review from Den of Geek, the third episode "Sleeping Giants" is described as a "good ol' fashioned episode of The 100", praising its balance of action, humour, and rich relationships.

The sixth season also has a 100 percent on Rotten Tomatoes, averaging a score of 7.20/10 based on 10 reviews. The site's consensus is, "The 100 successfully resets its game, proving that conflict lies within these characters rather than their environment, and sows the seeds for a killer final season." In particular, the sixth season's change of scenery was the subject of a range of reactions. Nicolene Putter of Cultured Vultures praised the new storylines, stating "the cutthroat plotlines will always have you sitting on the edge of your seat", and Selina Wilken of Hypable praised the season premiere for, despite introducing a lot of new information, overall being "a solid opening hour of a semi-reset version of The 100". On the other hand, Yana Grebenyuk of TV Fanatic criticized the various subplots, referring to the season finale "The Blood of Sanctum" as "a collective statement on what happens when there's too much plot and not enough time found to pace it".

The seventh season has a 100 percent rating on Rotten Tomatoes, with an average score of 7.50/10 based on 8 reviews. While the earlier episodes of season seven, such as the backdoor pilot to the cancelled prequel series "Anaconda", were generally met with praise, the later episodes and in particular the season and series finale received backlash. The 13th episode, "Blood Giant", was panned by critics and fans alike for its killing of Bellamy, one of the show's leads since the first season. Grebenyuk called the episode out for "undermin[ing] the two leads, their love for one another, and the show's entire message"; Den of Geek reviewer Delia Harrington viewed his re-characterization and subsequent death as "baffling". The season's final episode and series finale, "The Last War", was also widely criticized as an ineffective end to the series. Zack Giaimo of FanSided writes "despite some good scenes, the series finale of The 100 wastes a lot of the character development of the last seven seasons". In a more positive review, a SpoilerTV reviewer said that while the finale was not without mistakes, it was enough to satisfy long-time viewers and gave the leads a happy ending.

In 2016, Rolling Stone ranked the show #36 on its list of the "40 Best Science Fiction TV Shows of All Time".

=== "Bury your gays" controversy ===
In 2016, the series and showrunner Jason Rothenberg faced widespread controversy when Lexa, the leader of the Grounders and a lesbian character, was killed off in the third-season episode "Thirteen". Some critics and fans considered the death and the way it was written a continuation of the bury your gays trope in television, in which LGBT characters, especially queer women, are killed off far more often than others, implicitly portraying them as disposable and existing primarily to serve the stories of straight characters or to attract viewers. Lexa's death occurring immediately after having sex with Clarke received particular criticism. With The 100, along with shows like The Walking Dead and Supernatural all containing examples of the "bury your gays" trope around the same time, many were left upset. Fans of the show rallied behind the phrase "Lexa Deserved Better" as a way to show their disapproval of the character's death. A debate about the trope among media, writers and viewers ensued, with Lexa's death cited by some as a prime example of the trope and why it should end. Rothenberg eventually wrote in response, "I [...] write and produce television for the real world where negative and hurtful tropes exist. And I am very sorry for not recognizing this as fully as I should have." Additionally, Debnam-Carey's concurrent role in the series Fear the Walking Dead was presented as an off-screen reason for Lexa's death.

=== Ratings ===
Viewership and ratings per season of The 100
Season	Timeslot (ET)	Episodes	First aired		Last aired		TV season	Viewership rank	Avg. viewers (millions)	Avg. 18–49 rating
Season	Timeslot (ET)	Episodes	Date	Viewers (millions)	Date	Viewers (millions)	TV season	Viewership rank	Avg. viewers (millions)	Avg. 18–49 rating
1	Wednesday 9:00 pm	13	March 19, 2014	2.73	June 11, 2014	1.68	2013–14	150	2.59	1.1
2	Wednesday 9:00 pm	16	October 22, 2014	1.54	March 11, 2015	1.34	2014–15	157	2.46	0.9
3	Thursday 9:00 pm	16	January 21, 2016	1.88	May 19, 2016	1.31	2015–16	165	1.94	0.7
4	Wednesday 9:00 pm	13	February 1, 2017	1.21	May 24, 2017	0.91	2016–17	158	1.47	N/A
5	Tuesday 9:00 pm (1–8); Tuesday 8:00 pm (9–13)	13	April 24, 2018	1.43	August 7, 2018	0.99	2017–18	182	1.61	0.5
6	Tuesday 9:00 pm	13	April 30, 2019	0.86	August 6, 2019	0.59	2018–19	165	1.30	0.4
7	Wednesday 8:00 pm	16	May 20, 2020	0.80	September 30, 2020	0.61	2019–20	TBD	TBD	TBD

An estimated 2.7 million American viewers watched the series premiere, which received an 18–49 rating of 0.9, making it the most-watched show in its time slot on the CW since 2010, with the series Life Unexpected.

The 100 : U.S. viewers per episode (millions)

Season	Episode number															
Season	1	2	3	4	5	6	7	8	9	10	11	12	13	14	15	16
1	2.73	2.27	1.90	1.69	1.80	1.97	1.88	1.64	1.73	1.46	1.71	1.58	1.68	–		
2	1.54	1.48	1.68	1.75	1.64	1.86	1.62	1.40	1.48	1.53	1.51	1.36	1.42	1.55	1.49	1.34
3	1.88	1.63	1.57	1.32	1.36	1.41	1.39	1.20	1.23	1.13	1.08	1.15	1.27	1.13	1.17	1.29
4	1.21	1.01	1.05	1.00	1.02	0.98	0.90	0.97	0.81	0.85	0.86	0.83	0.91	–		
5	1.43	1.02	1.08	1.07	0.94	0.92	0.83	0.73	0.89	0.86	0.85	0.88	0.99	–		
6	0.86	0.81	0.82	0.73	0.73	0.64	0.72	0.63	0.70	0.57	0.54	0.61	0.59	–		
7	0.80	0.76	0.71	0.63	0.68	0.57	0.64	0.67	0.61	0.47	0.58	0.54	0.59	0.63	0.52	0.61

Audience measurement performed by Nielsen Media Research

=== Accolades ===
Accolades for The 100
Year	Award	Category	Nominee(s)	Result	Ref.
2014	Primetime Emmy Awards	Outstanding Special Visual Effects	Andrew Orloff, Michael Cliett, Tyler Weiss, Kornel Farkas, Chris Pounds, Andrew Bain and Mike Rhone (episode: "We Are Grounders, Part 2")	Nominated	
2015	Golden Reel Awards	Best Sound Editing – Sound Effects and Foley in Short Form Television	Norval D. Crutcher III, Peter Austin, Peter D. Lago, Mitch Gettleman, Catherine Harper, Ellen Heuer, Marc Meyer	Nominated	
2015	Leo Awards	Best Costume Design in a Dramatic Series	Katia Stano (episodes: "Many Happy Returns" & "Spacewalker")	Nominated	
2015	Leo Awards	Best Guest Performance by a Male in a Dramatic Series	Richard Harmon (episode: "We Are Grounders Part 1")	Nominated	
2015	Leo Awards	Best Production Design in a Dramatic Series	Matthew Budgeon (episode: "Murphy's Law")	Nominated	
2015	Leo Awards	Best Production Design in a Dramatic Series	James Philpott (episode: "The 48")	Nominated	
2015	MTV Fandom Awards	Ship of the Year	Alycia Debnam-Carey and Eliza Taylor	Nominated	
2015	Saturn Awards	Best Youth-Oriented Series	The 100	Won	
2015	Teen Choice Awards	Choice TV Actor: Sci-Fi/Fantasy	Bob Morley	Nominated	
2015	Teen Choice Awards	Choice TV Actress: Sci-Fi/Fantasy	Eliza Taylor	Nominated	
2015	Teen Choice Awards	Choice TV Show: Sci-Fi/Fantasy	The 100	Nominated	
2016	Golden Reel Awards	Best Sound Editing in Television – Short Form: Dialogue & ADR	Norval "Charlie" Crutcher III	Nominated	
2016	Leo Awards	Best Production Design in a Dramatic Series	James Philpott, Alyssa King and Alex Royek (episode:"Wanheda: Part 1")	Nominated	
2016	MTV Fandom Awards	Fan Freakout of the Year	Alycia Debnam-Carey	Won	
2016	MTV Fandom Awards	Ship of the Year	Eliza Taylor and Alycia Debnam-Carey	Nominated	
2016	Saturn Awards	Best Science Fiction Television Series	The 100	Nominated	
2016	Teen Choice Awards	Choice TV: Chemistry	Eliza Taylor and Bob Morley	Nominated	
2016	Teen Choice Awards	Choice TV Actress: Sci-Fi/Fantasy	Eliza Taylor	Nominated	
2017	Saturn Awards	Best Science Fiction Television Series	The 100	Nominated	
2017	Teen Choice Awards	Choice Sci-Fi/Fantasy TV Actor	Bob Morley	Nominated	
2017	Teen Choice Awards	Choice Sci-Fi/Fantasy TV Actress	Eliza Taylor	Nominated	
2017	Teen Choice Awards	Choice TV Ship	Eliza Taylor and Bob Morley	Nominated	
2018	Leo Awards	Best Stunt Coordination in a Dramatic Series	Marshall Virtue and Kim Chiang (episode: "Die All, Die Merrily")	Nominated	
2018	Leo Awards	Best Supporting Performance by a Male in a Dramatic Series	Richard Harmon (episode: "God Complex")	Nominated	
2018	Saturn Awards	Best Science Fiction Television Series	The 100	Nominated	
2018	Teen Choice Awards	Choice Sci-Fi/Fantasy TV Actor	Bob Morley	Nominated	
2018	Teen Choice Awards	Choice Sci-Fi/Fantasy TV Actress	Eliza Taylor	Nominated	
2018	Teen Choice Awards	Choice Sci-Fi/Fantasy TV Show	The 100	Nominated	
2019	Teen Choice Awards	Choice Sci-Fi/Fantasy TV Actor	Bob Morley	Nominated	
2019	Teen Choice Awards	Choice Sci-Fi/Fantasy TV Show	The 100	Nominated	
2019	Saturn Awards	Best Science Fiction Television Series	The 100	Nominated	

== Cancelled prequel series ==
In October 2019, Rothenberg began developing a prequel series to The 100 for the CW. A backdoor pilot episode was ordered; "Anaconda" aired July 8, 2020, as an episode of the seventh and final season of The 100. The prequel series was to show the events 97 years before the original series, beginning with the nuclear apocalypse that wiped out almost all life on Earth.

In February 2020, it was reported that Iola Evans, Adain Bradley, and Leo Howard had been cast as Callie, Reese, and August, respectively. Jason Rothenberg was to serve as an executive producer with The 100 executive producers Leslie Morgenstein and Gina Girolamo of Alloy to serve as producers.

In January 2021, Deadline reported that the prequel series was still being considered. In May 2021, according to Mark Pedowitz of the CW, the spinoff was still under consideration by the network. In November 2021, it was reported that the CW had decided not to move forward with the prequel series.
