= Lexa (The 100) =

Character from The CW's TV series The 100

- The 100 character
- First appearance: "Fog of War" (2014)
- Last appearance: "The Last War" (2020)
- Created by: Jason Rothenberg; Kira Snyder
- Portrayed by: Alycia Debnam-Carey

In-universe information
- Alias: Heda
- Species: Human
- Gender: Female
- Occupation: Commander of the Grounders
- Significant others: Costia; Clarke Griffin

Lexa is a fictional character from the post-apocalyptic science fiction television series The 100, portrayed by Alycia Debnam-Carey. The recurring character does not appear in the books on which the series is loosely based. The commander of the allied Grounder clans, Lexa is portrayed as a reasonable leader and strong warrior. She considers love a weakness, a view significantly impacted by the murder of her former girlfriend. Although she starts to show romantic feelings for Clarke Griffin and takes her views into consideration, Lexa puts her people first, even at the expense of Clarke's trust. Lexa's progressive leadership places her in conflict with her people, especially after changes to her coalition.

Lexa has been acclaimed by critics, and is considered one of television's most interesting and complex female characters as well as a notable figure of LGBTQ representation in fiction. A fan-favorite, she has been a source of frequent debate, particularly for how she was written out of the series. Her relationship with Clarke, which was viewed as compelling and important, significantly impacted the LGBTQ community and many viewers embraced it as a positive and tempestuous depiction of friendship, love and adversity. The conclusion of the character and the relationship, however, was criticized by viewers and media for being unnecessarily tragic, leading to a national debate about the "bury your gays" trope and international fan-led initiatives.

== Appearances ==
=== Season 2 ===
The survivors from the Ark, a space habitat for descendants of humans who survived a nuclear apocalypse, crash landed on Earth and have been in conflict with the Grounders, descendants of humans on Earth who survived the nuclear apocalypse, who call them the Sky People.

After Ark survivor Finn's massacre of a Grounder village, Jaha and Kane, two former Ark leaders, are told that one must kill the other in order to speak with the commander of the Grounders. When Kane attempts to take his own life rather than kill Jaha, a Grounder witness reveals herself to be the commander, Lexa, who tells them she believes their wish for peace is sincere. She allows Jaha to leave with a message to their camp: leave within two days, or die. Clarke, an Ark survivor and leader of the Sky People's camp, cures Lincoln, a Grounder who was turned by Mount Weather, a former military facility, into a reaper (a mindless, cannibalistic killer). Clarke offers information about curing reapers to Commander Lexa and proposes that the two groups work together. Lexa grants Clarke the truce on the condition that Finn dies. Although the camp is divided on whether to turn him in, Finn eventually gives himself up to the Grounders. Lexa refuses to grant him mercy, but allows Clarke to say goodbye. After saying goodbye, Clarke stabs him, giving him a quick death. Several of the Grounders are angered by this mercy-kill, but Lexa declares the demands have been met and the truce will stand.

Lexa, Clarke and others from the camp travel to the Grounder village, where Finn and his victims are cremated. Lexa reveals to Clarke that her past love, Costia, was tortured and killed by Lexa's enemy, and tells Clarke that love is weakness. At a dinner, Lexa is the victim of an attempted poisoning. Clarke first believes it was Raven, Finn's former girlfriend, whom Lexa nearly kills as punishment; however, Clarke figures out that one of Lexa's people must have been responsible. The culprit is revealed to be Gustus, Lexa's right-hand man, who believes that an alliance with the Sky People would be destructive for Lexa. He is executed by Lexa, and Clarke resolves to infiltrate Mount Weather. After Clarke informs Lexa and Grounder councilors of the plan, one of them attempts to kill Clarke in the forest. Clarke is saved by Lexa, who is injured while they escape a giant mutated gorilla. Bellamy, Clarke's spy inside Mount Weather, learns of Mount Weather's plan to fire a missile to destroy any chance of peace between their people and the Grounders. Lexa persuades Clarke that warning anyone would compromise Bellamy's assignment and safety. The two secretly escape, but Clarke returns to rescue her mother, Abby, who arrives just before the missile strike. Clarke sets off with Lexa to kill Mount Weather's spotter who targeted the strike.

Lexa and Clarke discuss the plan of attack on Mount Weather, and Lexa tells Clarke that Clarke was born for leadership. After Bellamy's sister Octavia realizes that Lexa and Clarke knew about the missile strike, Lexa attempts to have her killed, but Clarke stops it. Clarke confronts Lexa, and Lexa reveals she has feelings for her. Clarke asks Lexa to trust her, and says that if another attempt on Octavia's life is made she will inform everyone that they knew of the missile. Lexa later tells Clarke that she does trust her and will not harm Octavia, although the Grounder ways are focused on survival. She kisses Clarke, who reciprocates but says that she is not ready to be with anyone. When Mount Weather's acid fog is disabled, they march with the combined Arker-Grounder forces to war.

Soldiers from Mount Weather open fire on the army, who manage to destroy the lock of the facility's doors. However, when they pull the door open, Lexa reveals that she has made a deal with Mount Weather and commands her people to stand down. The Grounders retreat and the Sky People soon follow, leaving behind a betrayed Clarke, who later irradiates the bunker, killing all its inhabitants.

=== Season 3 ===
Lexa's trusted warrior Indra warns her that the Ice Nation, a Grounder clan, is hunting Clarke, who has been a fugitive for three months because of her actions at Mount Weather. Lexa assigns the bounty hunter Roan, a banished Ice Nation prince, to capture Clarke before the Ice Nation does and bring her to Polis, the Grounder capital.

Having vowed revenge on Lexa for her betrayal, Clarke struggles with her desires for vengeance and forgiveness. Lexa is dealing with political turmoil and proposes to Clarke initiating the Sky People into her coalition as the thirteenth clan, which would protect them. Clarke believes Lexa wants this because Clarke's defeat of Mount Weather made Lexa look weak. Lexa is advised by her right-hand man and former mentor Titus to kill Clarke, whom he believes has weakened Lexa's rule. At the same time, Roan asks Clarke to kill Lexa, but she cannot do it. Lexa apologises for her betrayal, and Clarke agrees to the Sky People becoming the thirteenth clan, bowing to Lexa in the presence of other clan ambassadors. In private, Lexa vows that she will treat Clarke and the Sky People's needs as her own. Queen Nia of the Ice Nation attempts to stage a coup against Lexa's leadership and selects Roan to fight her in a duel. Lexa defeats him, but instead kills Nia and proclaims Roan the Ice Nation king. Clarke tends to her wounds and they bond.

Lexa, Clarke, other Grounders discover an army of dead Grounders, slain by Pike, the new and destructive leader of the Sky People, and his followers. Lexa is informed by a wounded Indra that the Sky People have rejected joining the coalition. Lexa allows Clarke to return to convince Bellamy to step down. Clarke fails but convinces Lexa to end the cycle of violence to gain eventual peace, although Lexa worries that by not retaliating she is betraying the actions of her predecessors. Lexa tells Clarke to decide the fate of Emerson, the last survivor of Mount Weather, whom Clarke decides to banish. As the Grounders celebrate their holy Ascension Day, a captured Octavia is brought in by a Grounder who says that the Sky People destroyed his village. Lexa ignores Titus' advice to start open warfare and instead orders that the Sky People be besieged and any trespasser on Grounder territory killed. The Grounder attempts to kill Lexa, and is killed by Titus. Titus tells Lexa that Clarke's presence endangers her and reminds Lexa of Costia. An angry Lexa reminds him that she can separate feelings from duty, having accepted the Ice Nation into her coalition after they beheaded Costia.

Lexa understands that Clarke must go back to her people. Clarke suggests that maybe someday they will owe nothing more to both their peoples, and kisses Lexa; they have sex. After hearing gunshots, Lexa runs to Clarke's room and is accidentally shot by Titus, who had intended to kill Clarke. As Clarke attempts to save her, Lexa realises she will die and tells Clarke to not be afraid. She orders Titus to never harm Clarke again and to serve the next commander as he served her. Lexa tells Clarke that her spirit will find a new commander, that her fight is over and that Clarke was right in that life should be about more than just surviving. When Lexa dies, Titus extracts a device called "the Flame" from her neck. It is revealed to be Lexa's "spirit", an AI, and how commanders are chosen.

Later, on a mission to stop a holographic AI named ALIE from world domination, Clarke is implanted with the Flame, the AI Lexa once carried. ALIE controls its subjects by forcing them to swallow a chip that removes all pain and connecting them to a virtual reality called "the City of Light", where the minds of those who have died live on. In distress after entering the city, Clarke subconsciously calls upon Lexa. Lexa's consciousness, saved in the Flame, appears in the City of Light and saves Clarke. Before Lexa sacrifices herself to get Clarke to safety, Clarke tells Lexa that she loves her. Lexa says that her spirit will always be with Clarke.

=== Later seasons ===
In the fifth season, it is revealed that Lexa's consciousness is still in the Flame. The new Commander, a young girl named Madi, tells Clarke that Lexa abandoning her at Mount Weather was her greatest regret. In season seven, The Flame is permanently destroyed by a geneticist, taking with it the consciousnesses of the Commanders stored within, Lexa included. In the series finale "The Last War", a being known as the Judge, who judges a species on whether they are worthy of Transcendence or extermination, takes on the form of several humans in the final test for humanity. Appearing to an individual as their greatest teacher, greatest failure, or greatest love, the Judge appears as Lexa before Clarke and discusses Clarke's actions and the decisions of her friends. The Judge in Lexa's form has the last words in the series, stating: "A curious species, indeed".

== Development ==
=== Casting and creation ===
Show creator Jason Rothenberg said he and others involved with the series were aware of Debnam-Carey while casting Clarke in 2014; although the chance for her to portray Clarke did not materialize, her name was brought up for the casting of Lexa. Debnam-Carey was offered the role, which Rothenberg called a "no-brainer". At the time, she was also being considered for the role of Alicia Clark on AMC's Fear the Walking Dead, with her casting announced on December 1, 2014. "That's always a concern when you have an actor in your show that is popping—that someone else is going to grab them and make them a series regular if you don't", stated Rothenberg. Debnam-Carey was able to continue work on both shows. With "such an iconic look and distinct wardrobe", Lexa was an unusual role for Debnam-Carey. She said that the character allowed for a multifaceted dynamic, and called Lexa her favorite character she had portrayed thus far. "Thankfully, Jason [Rothenberg], the creative team, the writers, and the hair and make-up are very collaborative", she said. "We've been able to embrace it and really make it our own, and that's been wonderful".

Lexa does not appear in the books on which the series is loosely based. Introduced in the sixth episode of the second season, "Fog of War", which Kira Snyder wrote, Lexa was created through discussions Snyder had in the writer's room. When developing the character further, the idea of her being romantically interested in women was pitched. Rothenberg read the script for episode nine, where Lexa tells Clarke of her former female love, Costia, "the first reference to her sexuality". He thought, "let me talk to the writers about this and see where we're going", and decided it "made perfect sense". The CW was also supportive of the character. "The fact that it’s taken off the way it [has is] really cool", Rothenberg stated. "It’s been a good phenomenon to watch happen".

From top to bottom: Lexa on her throne in war paint and Grounder attire; captures showcasing the wardrobe from different angles.

Rothenberg said he and his crew did some research on depicting different societies, such as the Grounders, but most of what is shown is based on his personal tastes. "Getting to create this universe from the language to the wardrobe to the tattoos ... we obviously get pretty deep into what the grounder spirituality is and means", he stated. "We do some research as to how societies have evolved in the past but for the most part it's fiction". Debnam-Carey felt that the Grounder culture—the language, wardrobe, makeup and "all the symbolic meaning behind that"—was "one of the highlights" for her. "We explored it as much as we could as actors to break down its meaning, but the best thing about this was finally finding out all this backstory and fully creating this world", she stated, adding they "had three sets built just for the Grounders". In 2015, two commander jackets were described as being "made out of leather, metal, and fur".

Dany Roth of Syfy was impressed by the show's costume designs, stating that they are "possibly the best on TV right now. Each costume tells the story of the world, of the people, of the specific character". He said that, like Mad Max, The 100 "understands that the Grounders are repurposing tools and clothing from a time long dead. But the costumes are far from uniform. The people who lived on the ark, the people who live in the forest, the people who live in a frozen tundra, they all dress differently". Although "there's fashion here that makes the clothes exciting", it is the clothes that tell the story. Maureen Ryan of Variety, stated that the "most enduring image of Lexa is one of her sitting on a throne made of intertwined branches, her enigmatic eyes looking out from a face half-covered in elaborate war paint". Debnam-Carey said, "I'm lucky they put me in such a badass costume and makeup. We did a whole day of tests with that makeup." She and the wardrobe and makeup department collaborated with Rothenberg on the look of the character, and fans were encouraged to contribute their versions of the designs on social media.

=== Personality and portrayal ===
The writers conceived Lexa as a proud and wise warrior who keeps her feelings very guarded, and someone who is usually unable to show she cares for people. The vulnerability that results from caring, and particularly loving a person, is something she views as a weakness. This was significantly exacerbated by the death of her girlfriend, Costia; the anger, grief and later dissipation of the grief hardened her further. In addition, being selected as commander involved Lexa going through a brutal process, as is her society's custom; if she shows weakness in her duties as a commander, she can lose the respect of her warriors. Lexa has a soft spot for the next generation of warriors and leaders she trains, but "she has to keep her distance because she knows that the moment she weakens is the moment that everything falls".

Debnam-Carey said figuring out how to portray all these aspects of the character was the most challenging part. "For me, it was about finding that mix between vulnerability and tension and a wiseness beyond her years", she said. A director in one of her first episodes had advised her that less is more. She developed further Lexa's personality and mannerisms, some unconsciously; "Someone was like, 'Is it a thing you've chosen to do, to not blink all the time?' I was like, 'Wow!' When it comes to Lexa, she's very steely-gazed. There's a presence about her and a knowingness, and she's always observant. I started to pick up all these traits ... that I didn’t expect." The character is "very stand offish and aloof and it's hard to read her", Debnam-Carey said. Making sure she was not robotic and inhuman was difficult; "she has those qualities. That was definitely the hardest thing but it’s coming through." Debnam-Carey did not view Lexa as a teenager, and did not assign her an age, stating, "It's almost like she skipped that period. She was placed in a position where suddenly she was forced to make a lot of hard choices that most people never have to make, no matter what their age is.

Lexa is the first Grounder leader to seek peace, which Debnam-Carey described as "somewhat difficult" for the other Grounders to understand because of their "rough and aggressive" culture. She is also "the first person to unite the 12 clans and to actually have the option of an alliance". Throughout, she is extremely loyal, but more so to her own people, putting them first regardless of the cost. Debnam-Carey said "it's in [Lexa's] blood" to put her people first because they "are so close to her, that's what she's been groomed to be. She comes from a really harsh culture and she has huge responsibilities". The character is "brutal" and a "pragmatist", "but not out of unkindness. It's all she's ever known". By making calculated choices, she is used to getting what she wants. Debnam-Carey said Lexa makes choices "based on necessity" and is "very logical about [them] but she’s not immune to the consequences. She realizes the consequences, but will deal with them when they come." She adapts to the circumstances, and has "a control and a fluidity through situations".

=== Relationship with Clarke ===
Lexa's relationship with Clarke is depicted as intense, complex, and the one thing that softens Lexa's outlook on life. Debnam-Carey said the characters' progression from being allies to becoming romantic "stems from a connection that they both share—which is similar experiences and similar positions"; they are "both very young leaders with great authority, a lot of responsibility. They have to lead a huge amount of people [and] have a lot of expectations riding on them". She said the sudden responsibilities they faced, the need to make the right decisions, and having grieved over past lovers helped connect them further, and it is a connection they did not have with others. Rothenberg stated that, while he would not go as far to say that it was love at first sight for Lexa, "it definitely was a bit of a thunderbolt moment for her when she first saw Clarke". He said Clarke's attraction to Lexa "developed a little bit more slowly, but by the end [...] they were very much intrigued at the possibility of a romantic relationship". He later said "Lexa was definitely smitten—like love at first sight, probably", but maintained it took longer for Clarke to develop romantic feelings for Lexa. Writer Kira Snyder stated, "we're really happy to have that storyline and really gratified that it's sparked the fan response and press response that it has. It just goes down to the issues of representation [...] that's something I'm very pleased to be involved with."

Debnam-Carey appreciated the fact the writers did not make a big deal of defining either characters' sexuality or their romantic relationship on the show. Rothenberg said labels and gender are not a factor in the series, which Debnam-Carey viewed as true to the story. "It's a world where people love people for who they are and not what they are and that creates such a broad variety of characters. [...] it also doesn't make it out to be this statement", she said. "In this world, some things are a little better after the apocalypse [...] It kind of represents, in a way, an ideal place where people love people and it doesn't have to be a thing, which I think is really great".

Debnam-Carey considered the characters being "very adaptable" as one of the interesting aspects of their dynamic. Sacrifices Lexa and Clarke make are "for a much greater goal in the end". They have also "taken characteristics from each other", with Lexa becoming more trusting and learning that love can be empowering, and Clarke becoming more ruthless. "It's very interesting to see the way they ebb and flow with each other", she said. Of Lexa possibly putting Clarke first instead of her own people, she said perhaps if "Clarke was able to assimilate to their culture as well and become more of a right-hand man, then maybe I think Lexa could—then that would be a merger of two people". Lexa's weaknesses, as indicated by Debnam-Carey, are her feelings for her people and Clarke.

Regarding the decision to have Lexa betray Clarke, a significant moment that strained the characters' relationship, Rothenberg said Lexa was under the impression that Clarke would likely die in the battle and Mount Weather would possibly remain to keep her people united. "She was probably—master strategist that she is—thinking several moves ahead. Thinking she could keep her alliance together, the 12 clans, because they would still have this evil empire out there to unite them", he stated. Lexa was not expecting Clarke to win and to subsequently become a legend. "Everywhere she goes it's like, 'I heard it was 5,000 people! No, I heard it was 10,000 people!'", said Rothenberg. "Certainly it means that her alliance now no longer has a real reason to be held together". Rothenberg said Clarke would eventually come to terms with the likelihood that, if she had been in a similar position as Lexa, she would have done the same thing: Protect her own people at all costs. He said she did as much in the season two finale. "That was kind of the theme of the entire season, which was how far can you go and still be the good guy in order to save your people. Lexa had that choice. Obviously, it landed very emotionally for both of them, but especially on Clarke", he stated. "Clarke had a similar choice and I hope that over the course of the first part of [season 3], Clarke will eventually come to see it that way. If she can't, then they'll never figure out a way to make peace with each other".

Debnam-Carey viewed the betrayal and abandonment as a release for herself as an actor, and as a "very honest" and "open" moment for Lexa. "It's the first real time you get to see—apart from [them sharing a kiss]—this is a scene where she makes a really strong choice, but you can see that it's hard for her to do, and she does care", she stated. To Debnam-Carey, Lexa "showing that she cared, even in that moment of betrayal" was her being real. Snyder said that Lexa "obviously has a lot of sort of baggage—not just with Clarke but everybody". Debnam-Carey argued that even though Lexa was upset by the betrayal, she is a very hardened person and her people continued to be her main concern. She does not think Lexa was preoccupied with the repercussions. Unlike Rothenberg, Debnam-Carey felt Lexa "always knew [Clarke] was going to [survive]. Now those cards are back on the table, if she wants to restart an alliance or whatever else".

In the series finale, the Judge taking on Lexa's form served to confirm that Lexa was in fact Clarke's greatest love.

== Reception ==
=== General ===
Lexa, and her relationship with Clarke, has received acclaim from critics and fans, with Debnam-Carey receiving praise for her portrayal of the character. Maureen Ryan, writing for The Huffington Post, stated that Lexa stood out in a show "packed with morally compromised characters", leading "a tribe of Earth inhabitants with a combination of deftness, intelligence and unhesitating ferocity". She "does not suffer fools gladly, yet Debnam-Carey made Lexa's vulnerability and her attraction to Clarke not just believable, but engrossing". IGN's Eric Goldman noted that Lexa "conveyed strength and confidence, tempered with a more progressive - by Grounder standards - viewpoint". Hypable.com's Selina Wilken deemed Lexa a "strong and compassionate" leader and praised the subtle introduction of her sexuality, asserting that, unlike many LGBT characters being "defined mainly by their sexuality", having her "casually reveal that she’s queer and then carry on with her day sends a strong message", while her sexuality "is the least interesting thing about her". Linda Ge of TheWrap referred to her as a fan-favorite, and Goldman called her "a standout, highly popular character" who "just pops in every way" and was a "terrific inclusion" for the show. The staff for SheWired declared that Lexa "had the best character introduction ever and never stopped being great", proving to be "endlessly engaging, even when she's making choices that make us want to crawl into a ball and cry". Dana Piccoli of AfterEllen described Lexa as a "mysterious queer character", and complimented the "chemistry and increasing bond" between her and Clarke, noting that both are smart, young women who "manage to see the bigger picture" and are "leading their people to salvation or at least as close to salvation as they can get".

Of Lexa's introduction in the season two episode "Fog of War", Nick Hogan of TVOvermind felt she "stole the show", impressed by how she "contrasted between an innocent girl doing a terrible task and an undercover grounder commander". For the following episode, Goldman stated that "a very thoughtful, intense energy" from Debnam Carey "helped sell this young woman as the Commander others would follow without hesitation". Lisa Steinberg of The Huffington Post said that the pact between the Grounders and Sky People showcases Lexa as "one of the show's most compelling characters", and "if looks could kill, Debnam-Carey's portrayal of Lexa would be a lethal weapon". Reviewing "Bodyguard of Lies", The A.V. Club's Kyle Fowle remarked that Debnam-Carey and Taylor as Clarke have a "magnetism about them that injects their conversations with significant weight, and makes their characters feel like natural leaders". Amanda Festa of TV Fanatic praised Debnam-Carey "perfectly portraying the cracking of Lexa's carefully constructed facade". Wilken felt the scene in which Lexa "finally begins to crack" was "brilliant", lauding the actress's performance. Den of Geek wrote that Debnam-Carey shows Lexa's "own crumbling resolve exclusively on her face as her feelings for Clarke open her up to seeing another way of thinking".

Many viewers were upset by Lexa abandoning Clarke and her people at the end of season two, resulting in debates about why she may have done it. TVLine's Andy Swift was indignant, commenting "Lexa, please meet a fiery death. ASAP." Ryan McGee of ScreenCrush said Lexa's betrayal is "as complex as their kiss", which suggested "that it's not enough in a world in which survival is far from guaranteed". Applauding the complexity and nuance of their relationship, McGee felt this development "only strengthened [his] love of this pair". Goldman wrote that if viewers had not invested in Lexa and Clarke's circumstances, "it could easily have damaged the central storyline", and Debnam-Carey and Taylor "expertly embody two people who had every reason to be on guard around each other, but sensed something similar bringing them together." McGee deemed Lexa and Clarke the "most interesting character dynamic on television". The "genius" of the season, he observed, is placing the two actresses "into the roles traditionally associated with men and not commenting on this fact at all". Ryan in The Huffington Post declared Debnam-Carey "fantastic" in the season, and hoped for the character to return next season. Goldman said the actress "was a real find in this role, giving a terrific performance playing a very guarded character, who lived by a "love is a weakness" code that she couldn't quite actually follow".

Fowle stated that Lexa and Clarke are a "tangle of emotions and motivations" and "recognize the burden of responsibility" they each have. "Clarke's relative forgiveness of Lexa" in the third season "makes sense within the context of the war of her people, and the larger political conflict at hand", and their reconciliation is "loyalty informed by weeks of patient storytelling". Mariya Karimjee of Vulture considered their confrontation "emotionally grounded and real", while the heavy, emotional struggle came from both characters, with Clarke feeling "something complicated and messy with Lexa", later realizing that "Lexa is the only person who understands her". Entertainment Weekly's Jeff Jensen regarded the characters' bond as "arguably the show’s most compelling relationship", adding that Debnam-Carey "shows bolder shades as Lexa fends off conspiracies and pines for renewed connection with Clarke". Goldman stated, "Considering how reserved and stoic Lexa is, it’s a testament to Debnam-Carey that she manages to convey all of these intense feelings, without getting too verbal or openly emotional." Dened Rey of Talk Nerdy With Us proposed that Lexa is a character that "will be remembered in many years to come" and she and Clarke have a relationship "admired by many because of how complex and breathtaking their journey has been", with the actresses giving "bone-chilling performances" that "enthrall whenever they share a scene".

Writing for Variety, Ryan observed that Lexa's return in the third season "has only been improved by getting to witness the games being played at her court", writing that Debnam-Carey "has been impressive since day one" and "watching Lexa handle insurrection, deal with complicated political realities and throw dudes off balconies has been a treat". Sam Joseph of Film-Book.com complimented the "goodnight" scene between Lexa and Clarke, as "more came across between those two in what wasn't said or done than what could’ve been. Points go to Debnam-Carey for subtly." In her review of the fourth episode, Wilken declared Lexa her favorite character "possibly on television in general", commending her qualities and being "sensible in a sea of short-sighted, war-hungry men and women", as well as her battle with Roan. Fowle felt that the "strength and nuance of the storytelling" in Lexa and Clarke's connected storyline "elevates the show", regarding it "thematically complex and thoughtful", with their actresses "turning in truly outstanding performances". Variety listed Lexa and Clarke's relationship as one of "30 TV Relationships That Make Us Believe in Love", stating: "Both women have had to make difficult, life-altering decisions to protect their people, but despite the blood on their hands, there's an enduring respect between the two that only makes their bond stronger and more compelling to watch."

Wilken wrote that Lexa's face throughout the fifth episode "held so many emotions. Betrayal, disappointment, anger, and exhaustion are all warring for control inside her, and Debnam-Carey's understated performance was perfect." Reviewing the seventh episode of the season, "Thirteen", Fowle said Lexa and Clarke's relationship "has always been more than romance, defined instead by strong convictions and a sense of duty". Despite Lexa dealing with "people with firmly-held, deeply-rooted beliefs [...] she knows that change needs to happen. It's complex thematic territory that uncomfortably resonates in our current political climate." Goldman praised the "really touching" final moments from Lexa in her dying scene, which was "beautifully played by Debnam-Carey and Taylor". Caralynn Lippo of TV Fanatic said the actresses' chemistry was "on at full force during "Thirteen"" and viewed Lexa's dying scene as "one of the show's most powerful and moving moments to date". Vox's Caroline Framke felt that although Lexa's death scene was performed "beautifully", the "rush" to get her and Clarke together "only to immediately kill Lexa off, was jarring". Lexa was "an incredibly powerful leader, and a casually queer woman", she added. "These two things rarely go together onscreen", making her an important figure for "non-token representation."

Wilken called Lexa "one of the best and, yes, most divisive characters in recent TV history". A character "wonderful in no small part because she was such a fully realized individual, with both strengths and flaws", who made certain decisions "for reasons that made sense for her and her people, but which complicated her character for the audience, and made her more than just Clarke’s knight in shining armor." Fowle contemplated that Lexa's resolve while facing the realities of protecting the Sky People and risking an uprising from her clans "is exactly what makes her one of the better characters on TV, which also makes her death sting that much more." Hailing Debnam-Carey's "stunning, visceral performance", Fowle stated "her steady presence on The 100 will be sorely missed." Ryan wrote that Debnam-Carey "has always been an incredibly important part of the show" and Lexa's presence and storyline in the series was a fruitful direction. Megan Logan of Inverse stated that "Lexa's overwhelming popularity wasn’t only about her character’s richness and complexity, or the dimension she added to the Grounders", she is "also unlike any other character on The 100 — or on any other show, for that matter." Writing for Collider, Carla Day proclaimed Lexa "a fierce and masterful leader" and "one of TV’s greatest characters" who "will be missed, but may her spirit live on."

After the series' conclusion, Kevin Pantoja of Screen Rant wrote in 2021,

"Lexa has a very good case for actually being the best character on the show overall. [...] She surprised many by being a young woman leading these warriors [...] [and] holding her own against anyone. She would listen to Clarke and partner up with her when she needed to but she also knew how to put her people first like a true leader. The romance between Clarke and Lexa is still adored by fans and there's a reason why the character returned for a few appearances after her death, including for the series finale."

=== LGBT community ===
Lexa and her relationship with Clarke had a significant impact on the LGBT community. Writing for Inverse, Megan Logan said the relationship was important to "people whose representation is limited" as it was "exciting, built on respect and trust, and seemed to have the effort and thought usually reserved for relationships between two main heterosexual characters". Selina Wilken of Hypable.com appreciated that the show had "subtly introduced [its] first queer character" with Lexa and that it is free of the other "big issues in today's society", like gender stereotyping, racism or misogyny, but felt the writers had been heteronormative with their romances before that point. "In a media landscape where gay, lesbian and bisexual characters are still often defined mainly by their sexuality, having Lexa — one of the show's strongest, most well-liked characters — casually reveal that she's queer and then carry on with her day sends a strong and important message to young viewers." Wilken stated that fans have been pleased with seeing "a strong female character not only take on a position of leadership [...] but to off-handedly reveal that she was once in a relationship with a woman".

Dalene Rovenstine of Entertainment Weekly noted that the series "featured unexpected twists, the shocking deaths of multiple main characters, and amounts of blood and gore you wouldn't expect to be approved on network TV. But none of those moments have created a stir quite like [...] when [Clarke and Lexa] locked lips". The kiss was trending on Twitter after it aired, and many fans created artwork of the characters and couple as the series progressed; others engaged in cosplay of Lexa. Debnam-Carey was surprised by the attention. She was new to Twitter and Instagram, and did not know what fandom shipping meant; she saw that fans had given the pairing the portmanteau "Clexa". She called the fan fervor and character artworks "an honor" and "flattering to bring a character to life that people find their self expression in and a safety with", adding that "It's one of the first shows that really has two characters in the cast that are gender and sexually fluid and embraces that. There are no labels. It’s a wonderful thing to be a part of." At Paleyfest 2016, she was made aware of fans raising money in Lexa's name for The Trevor Project, an organization for LGBT teenagers in need, and the fact that, at the time, $46,000 had been raised. As of July 13, 2016, over $135,000 have been raised.

=== Exit from the series ===
==== Fan reaction and impact ====
With Debnam-Carey's limited role on the series, Rothenberg contemplated how best to end Lexa's story. When he chose to kill her off, this resulted in much animosity among the fanbase, with viewers and critics debating whether she was killed off due to her same-sex relationship and whether she was killed off the right way. Many also felt the decision was a blow or slight to the LGBT community because of the view that it reinforced the "dead lesbian syndrome" (or "bury your gays") trope, which posits that a lesbian couple (or other same-sex couple) on television or in film can never be happy for long, if at all, because one or both of them will soon die. This was compounded by the character being killed off with a stray bullet moments after consummating her relationship with her female partner. Some fans compared Clarke and Lexa's final moments together to the 2002 death scene involving Willow Rosenberg and Tara Maclay from Buffy the Vampire Slayer, finding both moments problematic and that little has changed since then.

A number of factors contributed to the ensuing backlash: The misleading of fans by representatives of the show prior to the character's death; the self-promotion for the show as a proponent of progressive LGBTQ storytelling; the long silence from showrunner Rothenberg on the controversy despite frequent social media engagement; and the "betrayal fans felt at what they perceived to be a meaningless death for one of TV's few well-developed lesbian characters, incited a kind of revolt." Viewers expressed their thoughts and anger on Twitter, Tumblr, and other social media sites. A small fraction of fans threatened to dox the writers and made death threats, while some were suicidal and engaged in self-harm after watching the episode. Many fans expressed their confusion and disappointment with the death on social media and blogs, and attempted to communicate the issues with media writers. People associated with the show later responded, attempting to ease their thoughts and defending the series by stating characters die on the show all the time.

The show continuously "sought deep and frequent engagement with its fans" every season, and Rothenberg had given multiple interviews on their forward-thinking LGBTQ representation and retweeted stories from various publications that praised its representation. "Aided by the enthusiasm of the show's many LGBTQ viewers, the outreach campaign worked." Many marginalized teens and young adults "were feeling engaged, feeling represented, and feeling hopeful ... which inherently puts you in a position of power over them." Fans noted they had "constant reassurance from the writers and showrunner that [they] could trust them not to screw up these characters, that they were aware of the [dead lesbian] trope and would avoid it" even if the actress left the show. Fans had long speculated about the character's screen time and future survival chances due to the actress being on another series. Rothenberg mentioned in interviews that AMC was "awesome" with scheduling for Debnam-Carey to film for The 100.

In early 2016, Rothenberg touted Debnam-Carey's appearance in the season finale on Twitter, telling fans that they were welcome to visit the set in downtown Vancouver, and tweeting a picture of her and Taylor on set eating "rainbow" candy. Videos and tweets from fans near the set confirmed the actress' presence, spreading on social media that the character made it to the season finale. However, Lexa had been killed off months earlier, when the seventh episode filmed in the fall of 2015. The "trumpeting of her appearance at the end of the season prompted many viewers ... to keep hope alive". In the lead up to the episode of the death, Rothenberg and other writers were "ramping up expectations online, urging fans to watch live and to be ready for something extraordinary". In online conversations after the episode, and especially due to the manner of the death, fans expressed that they felt used and betrayed by the show. Variety recounted, "once it was clear that it had set off an ever-expanding array of firestorms, especially among LGBTQ fans, many of the powers that be associated with the show acted as if nothing were particularly amiss", with Rothenberg live-tweeting next week's episode "as if thinkpieces and damning critiques were not still being churned out". In the few initial interviews he did alongside the death episode, Rothenberg gave "little indication that he [understood] the depth of the sense of betrayal or the multitude of reasonable objections to the death story line." Co-executive producer and writer Javier Grillo-Marxuach engaged with fans, sympathizing and aiming to understand their thoughts on the issues.

The episode following Lexa's death was the lowest-rated in the series' history. Instead of watching, fans began trending and organizing. International fan-led initiatives such as "Lexa Deserved Better" and "LGBT Fans Deserve Better" emerged, initially dominating Twitter, and the "bury your gays" trope rose to a national debate. Fans put up billboards across major cities, while The Trevor Project, a charity that assists LGBTQ teens in crisis, received significant attention, with fans raising "more than $30,000 (£21,000) in just a few hours". By July 13, 2016, over $135,000 had been raised. In response to viewers' outrage and requests, cosmetics company Maybelline stated in March 2016 that it decided "to no longer advertise on that show", and Target stated in April, "We can confirm that we don't plan to run ads during this show". The fan outcry and discussions in media over Lexa's death led several screenwriters and producers to sign the Lexa Pledge, which requests that creators treat gay and lesbian characters with consideration of their emotional and cultural impact, including not "killing a queer character solely to further the plot of a straight one" and avoiding "story choices that perpetuate the toxic [Bury Your Gays] trope". Some have argued that this stifles creativity and the freedom to develop characters and stories, while others have welcomed the debate, even if they have not signed the pledge.

According to The Washington Post, one of the individuals who ran the website for LGBT Fans Deserve Better, stated: "LGBT fans get so little quality representation in the form of complex characters. [...] The message [in the way Lexa died] was pretty clear. [...] Minorities aren’t disposable characters. We don’t accept marginalized storylines. We’re not a focus group that you can pander to to use for ratings and then throw away the storylines". LGBT characters, characters of color and disabled characters are often "given secondary or tertiary storylines that can be thrown away. We’re getting to a point where we can’t accept that anymore."

In retrospective analyses, media outlets observed the impact of Lexa's death on the series, LGBT viewers, and lesbian representation in television. Tell-Tale TV wrote that while there were "highlights since then", the series hit "its obvious decline with the death of Lexa" in the third season, concluding that "When all is said and done, Lexa's legacy will likely be the thing that most of the general public remembers about The 100." Screen Rant noted that the show's "ratings never recovered from Lexa's death". TV Guide and TVLine said in 2020 that the character's death is still a subject of discussion for viewers to date. Gay Times defined the death as "arguably one of the most devastating for queer fans everywhere". Culturess recounted that while many lesbians had died on television before Lexa, her death "was met with fan outrage beyond anything anyone had seen before". Occurring in "a particularly violent and deadly year" for lesbians on television, Lexa's death was "the straw that broke the camel's back". Since the death controversy in 2016, Culturess stated in 2022 that some improvements have been made in lesbian representation on television, including more lesbian stories being told than before and fewer deaths. While "quantity doesn't always mean quality", representation today "isn't perfect", and a show having a queer character "doesn't mean they get to live to see the end", it is a significant sign of progress that "the landscape for lesbian representation on television ... went from almost 20 sapphic characters killed on screen in 2016 to one in 2021", igniting "hope that representation will only continue to get better".

==== Critical analyses ====
Calling Lexa's death "gut wrenching" and the uproar messy, Caroline Framke of Vox wrote that while the death "unexpectedly brought together several disparate story strands", Lexa was "an openly queer woman leading 12 armies, a rare sight for LGBTQ representation on television". Framke condemned the trope of "killing gay women off for shock value" and the show killing Lexa immediately after having sex and pillow talk with Clarke. Eric Goldman of IGN argued similarly, adding that this setup was "really trite and cliché", and while he thinks the writers did not intend to "imply 'sex = death', it ended up coming off that way". Goldman felt the manner of death is "unseemly and demeaning for a character of her status and significance", and remarked that fans of the couple "were truly manipulated and treated poorly".

Variety's Maureen Ryan, who called the couple's love and deathbed scenes on their own "spectacular", said the season had been rushed and Lexa's death after sex with Clarke "was another case of the show compressing a timeline to an unfortunate degree". The way a character dies matters, Ryan argued, particularly for communities under-represented and misrepresented in the media. Bethonie Butler of The Washington Post stated that part of what fueled the outrage is that The 100 was thought to be "progressive in its treatment of LGBT characters", so the death led to feelings of betrayal, and the controversy "reveals the pitfalls of a show misunderstanding its audience and the politics of minority representation onscreen". Hypable.com's Selina Wilken wrote that the season built Lexa up "before her fall, turning her into an almost King Arthur-like figure of salvation in this broken world, at least partly in an effort to blind-sight and devastate the audience when she died. (And... mission accomplished, all too well.)"

The A.V. Club's Kyle Fowle lamented the loss of the complex character, and felt that while it is "frustrating to see one of TV's prominent lesbian characters written off so hastily", the show made Lexa's death significant to other storylines as the episode deepened the mythology of The 100. Damian Holbrook of TV Insider argued that television writers and producers never hastily kill off a character and are "ultimately telling a story". In the Variety article "What TV Can Learn From 'The 100' Mess", Ryan stated that Lexa "happened to be one of the few well-developed and complex lesbians on TV", and contended that "on a story and thematic level", her "badly conceived" death "had little resonance and almost no meaning", and the "blithe manipulation of LGBTQ fans and the show's willingness to deploy harmful cliches about gay characters remain the things that rankle most".

Liz Shannon Miller of IndieWire wrote, "The outrage over the show falling prey to the 'lesbian death trope' was epic—in a season full of death, Lexa became an icon for how LGTBQ characters and characters of color seem to die an awful lot more than others". TV Guide listed the death as one of the most important television moments of 2016, noting that Lexa "was critically important to a portion of the population who watched the show: a strong, proudly LGBT character whose sexuality was only a part of who she was – a rarity on TV", and her death "sparked a year-long discussion about how, and why, this trope must change". Ryan proposed: "What has occurred since March 3 is not just a problem for The 100 and the CW, it's a cautionary tale for all of television." It is a "reminder that every story turn and promotional effort should be thoroughly thought through. Sloppy, dismissive and tin-eared moves by a show or its personnel aren't easy to bury or ignore these days, and fan engagement is a collaboration, not a spigot to be turned off whenever things get inconvenient."

==== Showrunner and portrayer response ====
When it came to whether or not the series would end with Clarke and Lexa together, Rothenberg said in January 2016 that he would not comment on the matter and knew where he wanted the series to go, but he was always open to a better idea. In March, Rothenberg said he had not always planned on killing Lexa, but the fact that Debnam-Carey was simultaneously on another show (Fear the Walking Dead) and was therefore unlikely to ever become a series regular on The 100, he felt use of the character would be limited or absent in the future. The writers decided to craft a death scene for her to propel the story forward. "As we were breaking the season, we talked about reincarnation in the Grounder world and how that was how commanders were selected. I didn't want to throw that out as nonsense [...] but I also didn't want to say that it was real reincarnation", he said. He had been reading The Singularity Is Near by Ray Kurzweil, which gave him the idea for incorporating a "technological reincarnation" storyline. "Lexa was just the most recent recipient of this artificial intelligence augmentation of her consciousness. So once we came up with that idea, that was the point at which everything jelled and sort of came together storytelling-wise", he stated. "And of course, if you're dealing with a story about reincarnation, you've got to die before you can be reincarnated. So Lexa dying became a very tragic necessity". Rothenberg said Clarke was in love with Lexa, that they were soulmates, and Lexa's death will haunt Clarke."

Debnam-Carey posted on social media, thanking everyone on the show and the fans: "It has been an honour to portray [Lexa]. To envelop myself in her skin. To be given the freedom to represent a moment in our cultural and social zeitgeist—she has left a great imprint on me. I will miss her. May we meet again". While at Paleyfest 2016 promoting Fear the Walking Dead, she publicly addressed Lexa's death controversy for the first time. In an interview with Entertainment Weekly, she said she was "surprised by the intensity and the fury" that came from fans and she did not think "anyone on the show expected such social outcry". To Debnam-Carey, "any attention we can draw to a movement like that is an amazing thing, and is a great thing to pursue and keep working towards". She added that Lexa's death never came from a place of hate or negativity from anyone in the show and the death was purely a creative decision made due to her obligations to Fear the Walking Dead. "I know obviously that it's hard when there are social issues going on and maybe they were dealt with in an insensitive way [...] And I hate that people feel like that. That's really awful if people feel ostracized or targeted". At her second Q&A panel at Copenhagen Comic-Con, she remarked, "It saddens me to think that this was an event that tarnished the show". Regarding the character's impact, Debnam-Carey said that it opened her eyes "to something I don't think I was truly aware of, that a character was able to inspire and galvanize people", and she felt proud of the way fans positively channeled their energies into action; "That’s incredible ... It became a positive thing, which is really the most important thing about it all."

Rothenberg said that although he was "very sorry for not recognizing [the "bury your gays" trope] as fully as [he] should have", he would have still killed off Lexa but written it in a way that does not perpetuate the trope, such as death after sex. He added that while he understands the argument that Lexa should have had a heroic death, he thought having such a powerful character die by a stray bullet was more realistic because it signifies that anyone can be in the wrong place at the wrong time. Rothenberg also said that, in retrospect, he would not have misleadingly boasted the relationship on social media. Javier Grillo-Marxuach, who wrote the episode, said, "I don't think that the failure here was to discuss [Lexa's death], the failure was to recognize the cultural impact it would have outside the show [...] I am grateful for the tidal wave that came down on me. The activism that goes on online is [very] important".

Regarding the unannounced appearance from Debnam-Carey as the judge embodying Lexa in the series finale, Rothenberg said he had to have multiple conversations with her "to explain exactly what we were going for and that we weren’t doing it in an exploitive way". According to Rothenberg, Debnam-Carey was keen on having "closure", and they agreed on not hyping her return, that it would be "better as a reveal, as a surprise". He was "grateful" that she agreed to return, and that he was able to direct the scenes with her and Taylor. He felt "a lot of pressure, as the director, having the responsibility of honoring that character", while knowing that "it wasn't actually Lexa [and] we had to find the line of how much Lexa to bring to it". Rothenberg and the writers had unanimously agreed to bring Debnam-Carey back to portray the being. "I’m hoping that the fans get some closure", Rothenberg said. "It won't satisfy everybody, but it was lovely to have her back." After the episode, Debnam-Carey posted on her social media that it was "an honour to put on the costume one last time and be reunited with #the100 family for the final episode", and "This was our ode to the love that Clarke and Lexa shared. A nod to how important they were to one another." She said that with any potential opportunities over the years for Lexa to re-appear, she "never wanted it to feel like it was a slap in the face to bring her back and take her away again." When Rothenberg informed her what the concept and purpose was, she felt "this is the only point that it makes sense." She said she wanted to do it "specifically for the fans and to have a little closure to finally feel like there was a positive spin that had happened. I know it was Lexa as the Judge and it wasn't necessarily Lexa as herself, but I still thought the sentiment was important."

== See also ==
- ClexaCon
- Media portrayal of LGBT people
- Media portrayal of lesbianism
