= Chuku Modu =

British actor

Chukwu Modu
- Born: Chukuma Modu; 19 June 1990 (age 36); Chiswick, London, England
- Education: Richmond Drama School
- Occupation: Actor
- Years active: 2014–present

Chukwuma "Chuku" Modu (born 19 June 1990) is a British actor best known for his roles in Game of Thrones, The Good Doctor and The 100.

== Biography ==
Modu was born to a mixed-race Igbo-German father and an Anglo-Irish mother in Chiswick, West London. He initially had an interest in sports, particularly boxing, and trained at the age of twelve. He would also visit the theatre and become cultured with the performances. In 2012, Modu attended the Richmond Drama School and has since begun his acting career.

Modu made his debut as a minor background character in Me Before You before making a recurring appearance on the HBO series Game of Thrones as Aggo. He joined the main cast of The Good Doctor as Dr. Jared Kalu, but did not return when the series was renewed for a second season. He did however, return for the show's 6th season in a recurring capacity, before regaining series regular status for the seventh and final season. He also had a role in the 2019 Marvel Studios film Captain Marvel. Modu is also the narrator of The Moment of Proof, a 2021 true-crime television documentary series telling the stories of police investigations.

== Filmography ==
Film
Year	Title	Role	Notes
2014	The Dawn	Apprentice	Short film
2014	The Last Days of Margaret Thatcher	Chris	Short film
2014	Loft No.5	Paul	Short film
2015	Stages	Jake Norland	Short film
2016	Me Before You	Mauritian Waiter	
2016	Heavy Weight	Paris	Short film
2016	Open All Night	Rick	
2016	Survive	Talib	Short film
2019	Captain Marvel	Soh-Larr	
2020	Freedoms Name Is Mighty Sweet	Charles Hunter	Short film; also co-writer and co-executive producer with Antonia Thomas
2022	Out of Darkness	Adem	

Television
Year	Title	Role	Notes
2016	Game of Thrones	Aggo	3 episodes
2017	Snatch	Flying Squad Leader	3 episodes
2017–2018, 2023–2024	The Good Doctor	Dr. Jared Kalu	Main role (Seasons 1–2, 7); Recurring role (Season 6); 36 episodes
2019–2020	The 100	Xavier/Dr. Gabriel Santiago	Recurring role (Season 6); Main role (Season 7); 22 episodes
2021-2025	The Moment of Proof	Himself (narrator)	BBC crime documentary series
2023	The Great	Smartsev	Episode: "You the People"
