= Tasya Teles =

Canadian actress

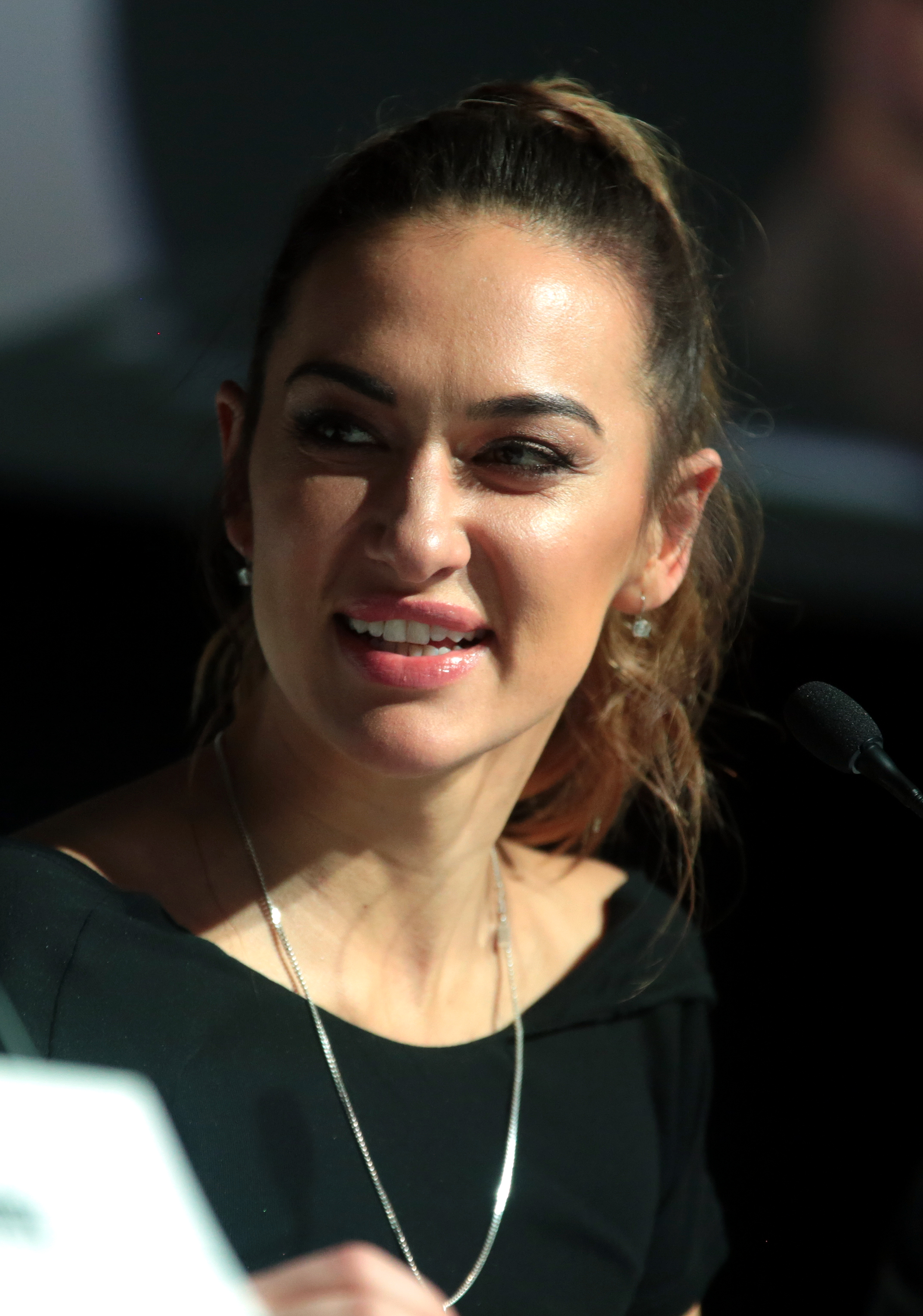
- Teles in March 2018
- Born: February 1, 1985 (age 40); Toronto, Ontario, Canada
- Occupation: Actress
- Years active: 2013–present
- Known for: The 100
- Website: tasyateles.com

Tasya Teles (Brazilian Portuguese: [ˈtɛlis]; born February 1, 1985) is a Canadian actress. She is known for her role as Echo in The CW's The 100. Teles has also played Kendra in DirecTV's Rogue, Nat in the Crave series Shoresy, and Daniella in BBC America's Intruders.

== Biography ==
Teles was born in Toronto, Ontario. Her father is Brazilian and her mother is Ukrainian. She and her family moved to Vancouver, British Columbia, when she was five years old. As a child she loved the American TV shows Family Matters, Boy Meets World and the British Absolutely Fabulous. Teles attended Concordia University in Montreal, Quebec, initially studying commerce but found it unsatisfying and later added theatre. After finishing her studies, graduating with a degree in finance, she returned to Vancouver.

== Career ==
Teles played the recurring role of Kendra on DirecTV's Rogue and was a series regular on The CW's The 100 in the role of Echo. Prior to earning the role of Echo, Teles had auditioned for several other roles on the TV show. She has also appeared on Showcase's Continuum, Lifetime's Witches of East End, USA Network's Rush, BBC America's Intruders and The CW's Supernatural and iZombie. Teles has also been featured in the Lifetime television film Grumpy Cat's Worst Christmas Ever, as well as having had a lead role in the Lifetime movies Damaged and Autumn Dreams. She has worked on several indie features, including starring roles in Leila, Regret, Magdalena, Eat Me and Skin Trade. She also voices Sitara in the video game Watch Dogs 2. Since 2022, Teles had a leading role in the Canadian TV show Shoresy as the character Nat, owner of the ice hockey team that the show's protagonist plays for. She had been looking to act in a comedy and accepted the role after it was offered to her by series creator Jared Keeso.

== Filmography ==
=== Film ===
Year	Title	Role	Notes
2013	Mirrors	Leah	
2013	Afflicted	Maria	
2014	Skin Trade	Rosa Cassidy	
2015	Autumn Dreams	Jovanna	
2016	Thirty-Seventeen	Carrie	
2018	The Perfect Pickup	Tracy	
2018	The Girl in the Bathtub	Terri	
2020	Break Even	Jaq Varick	

=== Television ===
Year	Title	Role	Notes
2013	Untold Stories of the E.R.	Charlene	Episode: "Deep Trouble"
2014	Package Deal	Hot Woman	Episode: "Danny's New Job"
2014	Continuum	Freelancer #2	Episode: "The Dying Minutes"
2014	Witches of East End	Nurse	Episode: "A Moveable Beast"
2014	Rogue	Kendra	4 episodes
2014	Rush	Officer Megan	Episode: "Learning to Fly"
2014	Intruders	Daniella	2 episodes
2014	Grumpy Cat's Worst Christmas Ever	Nicole	Television film
2014	The Christmas Secret	Female Paramedic	Television film
2014	Damaged	Kate Luck	Television film
2015	iZombie	Holly White	Episode: "Flight of the Living Dead"
2015	Supernatural	Nanny	Episode: "The Bad Seed"
2015	Autumn Dreams	Jovanna	Television film
2015–2020	The 100	Echo / Ash	Guest (seasons 2–3); recurring (season 4); main (season 5–7)
2017	Prison Break	Tricia	Episode: "Phaecia"
2017–2018	Travelers	Pike / Traveler 009	2 episodes
2022–present	Shoresy	Nat	Main role
2022	Legacies	Lynn	1 episode
2022	The Secrets of Bella Vista	Lourdes	Television film

=== Video games ===
Year	Title	Role	Notes
2016	Watch Dogs 2	Sitara Dhawan	Also motion capture
2018	Far Cry 5	Mary May Fairgrave	
