= The 100 (novel series) =

Novel series by Kass Morgan

- The 100's first edition cover
- The 100; Day 21; Homecoming; Rebellion
- Author: Kass Morgan
- Country: United States
- Language: English
- Publisher: Little, Brown Books for Young Readers
- Published: September 3, 2013; September 25, 2014; February 26, 2015; December 6, 2016
- Media type: Print (hardcover, paperback)
- No. of books: 4

The 100 is a series of young adult science fiction novels by Kass Morgan. The first book in the series, The 100, was published on September 3, 2013, by Little, Brown Books for Young Readers. Day 21, its sequel, was released on September 25, 2014, and Homecoming was released on February 26, 2015. A fourth novel, Rebellion, was released on December 6, 2016.

Prior to the publication of the first book, television producer Jason Rothenberg became interested in adapting the story for the screen. The eponymous TV series adaptation premiered on March 19, 2014, on The CW Network, starring Eliza Taylor and Bob Morley as Clarke Griffin and Bellamy Blake, respectively.

== Plot ==
A boxed set of the four books of The 100.

=== The 100 ===
The series is set three centuries after a thermonuclear apocalypse, wherein the only known survivors of the human race live in a space colony consisting of satellites joined in orbit around the Earth and governed by The Chancellor, who leads its legislative council. Resources are so scarce that all crimes, no matter how small, are punishable by death, unless the perpetrator is under 18 years of age.

The 100 begins with Clarke Griffin, a former medical student, being arrested for a crime committed by her parents: conducting illegal experiments on children under threat of the corrupt Vice Chancellor Rhodes. Clarke confides in her best friend Wells Jaha, The Chancellor's son. Despite swearing secrecy to Clarke, Wells tells his father, hoping to save the Griffins from Rhodes. His plan backfires, the Griffins are arrested, and his relationship with Clarke disintegrates. Two years later, the Colony decides to send 100 of its teenage prisoners to investigate whether or not Earth is habitable. Among the 100 are Clarke, Wells, Octavia Blake, her older maternal half-brother Bellamy Blake, and Clarke's friend, Thalia.

The group crashes somewhere on the East Coast in the former United States. Once there, the 100 struggle to survive in a world very different from the past Earth. Clarke tends to the wounded, and Bellamy gradually develops a romantic interest in her. It is revealed that Octavia had become a drug addict while in prison. A few days later, someone sets fire to the camp, killing Thalia. As the survivors investigate, they discover a farm not too far from the site, leading them to the realization that they are not alone.

=== The 100: Day 21 ===
Twenty-one days after they land on Earth, the 100 continue to face recurring attacks from an unknown enemy. Octavia has been missing since the fire. Wells tries to maintain morale, while Bellamy tries to find his sister. The 100 find an Earthborn girl, Sasha Walgrove, and hold her hostage. Sasha tells them that they have landed in the former state of Virginia, and that there are people from the Colony who arrived before the 100. Bellamy believes that Sasha's people are responsible for Octavia's disappearance and demands that Sasha reveal their location. Wells and Sasha romantically bond, and Sasha helps Wells find food for the surviving colonists.

In space, the people of the Colony fight to get into their drop ships as the space station's life support begins to fail; Clarke and Wells' friends, Glass and Luke, are among the people desperately trying to get to Earth. They find themselves at the mercy of Vice Chancellor Rhodes, who is willing to kill to get into one of the dropships.

Sasha leads Clarke and Bellamy to a colony beneath the ruins of Mount Weather Emergency Operations Center. There, they meet her father, Max Walgrove, who is the leader of the colony. Octavia is at Mount Weather, having been rescued by Max and his people from a group of renegades. These renegades are responsible for the attacks on the 100. Max and his people will continue helping the 100, and will provide further support once the rest of the Colony arrives. At this point, they find dropships from the Colony falling from the sky.

Wells eventually realizes that there is something familiar about Bellamy and Octavia; ultimately, he discovers that their mother was Melinda Blake, the woman his father had loved before marrying Wells' mother for the sake of his career. This discovery leads Wells and Bellamy to realize that they are paternal half-brothers.

=== The 100: Homecoming ===
After the dropships crash, Clarke, Bellamy, and Wells lead a rescue party to the crash site, allowing Clarke and Wells to reunite with Glass and Luke. Clarke ponders leaving the camp to search for her parents. The Chancellor, still in a coma, remains trapped in the Colony above Earth. Vice Chancellor Rhodes takes control over the community on Earth, planning to force Luke to execute Bellamy, as a warning to anyone attempting to challenge him.

With Sasha's help, Clarke and Wells escape with the wounded Bellamy. In addition, Glass and Luke flee the camp to escape Vice Chancellor Rhodes. One of Rhodes' men kills Sasha when she tries to get more supplies. Rhodes plans to attack Mount Weather to recapture Bellamy, Clarke, and Wells. As Mount Weather prepares for Rhodes' attack, some of the Colonists revolt and join their benefactors against Rhodes. Clarke, Bellamy, and Wells are captured during the initial exchange, but another faction of Earthborns defeat and capture Rhodes before he can execute Bellamy. Later, more colonists from other dropships arrive, and one of the arrivals informs Wells that his father was still in a coma, with only an hour of oxygen left when their dropship departed.

Before Sasha's funeral, Clarke reunites with her parents at Mount Weather. She reconciles with Wells but will not resume their past relationship because she is romantically involved with Bellamy, and Wells mourns Sasha.

=== The 100: Rebellion ===
A fourth novel, Rebellion, was released on December 6, 2016. A month after the previous novel, Bellamy begins showing signs of what Clarke thinks is paranoia when he obsesses over small details in the woods. A group of self-proclaimed "Protectors" infiltrates their camp and abducts several of its inhabitants, including Wells, Glass and Octavia. As Clarke and Bellamy organize a rescue team to take their new enemy down, their relationship is put to the ultimate test when Bellamy doesn't think Clarke trusts him.

Eventually, the rescue team and prisoners are able to take the Protectors down as a team effort and in the aftermath, Clarke and Bellamy make up and with her parents' blessing, he asks her to marry him.

== Reception ==
Publishers Weekly commented that Morgan's flair for the dramatic in The 100 "can be forced, but it's easy to be drawn in". In addition, Booklist calls The 100 "dark and riveting", blending "science fiction, romance, and characters' shadow sides with a mostly engrossing plotline. The 100 reached No. 13 on The New York Times' Young Adult Best Seller List.

Kirkus Reviews commented Day 21 is "faster paced than" its predecessor.

== Television adaptation ==
The official logo of the television series.

On May 9, 2013, The CW Television Network announced that the pilot was officially ordered to series for the 2013–14 American television season. The series is developed by Jason Rothenberg, and premiered on March 19, 2014. The seventh and final season consisted of 16 episodes, and premiered on May 20, 2020, finishing the show with a total of 100 episodes across all seven seasons.

In October 2019, it was confirmed that Rothenberg was developing a The 100 prequel series for The CW. A backdoor pilot episode was ordered; "Anaconda" aired July 8, 2020, as an episode of the seventh and final season. The prequel series would have been set 97 years before the events of the series, beginning with the nuclear apocalypse that wiped out almost all life on Earth. In November 2021, it was reported that The CW decided not to move forward with the prequel series.
