= Jason Rothenberg =

American television producer and writer

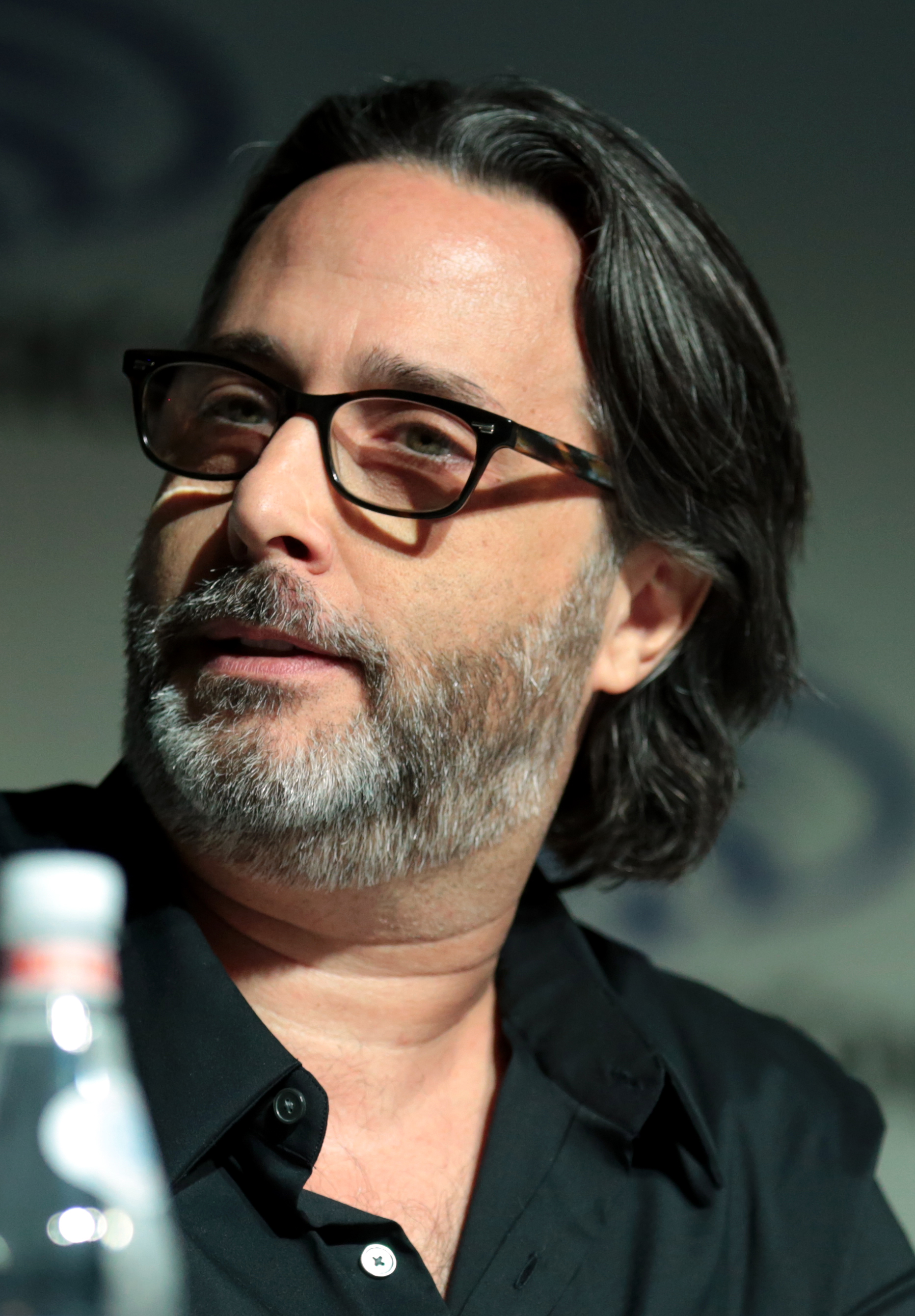
- Rothenberg at the 2018 WonderCon
- Occupations: Producer; Television writer director
- Writing career
- Language: English
- Notable work: The 100

Jason Rothenberg is an American television producer, writer and director, known for his work on The CW television series The 100.

== Career ==
=== Body Politic ===
In 2009, the CW ordered a pilot to Jason Rothenberg and Bill Robinson's long-in-the-works drama about a group of young Washington, D.C. staffers titled Body Politic. The project was originally sold to The WB back in November 2005 by ABC Studios (then known as Touchstone Television). However the show did not appear in the CW's fall schedule in early 2009 and on May 21, 2009, in an interview with Dawn Ostroff, the CW's CEO stated the show was still in consideration for midseason. Finally, on August 4, 2009, Dawn Ostroff announced that the project was officially dead for the CW.

After the CW didn't pick up the pilot, the Rothenberg and Robinson tried to promote the potential series to other networks including NBC and ABC. It was reported that NBC liked what they saw, but didn't have space for it and ABC was considering the series for midseason. In the end, no one picked up the series.

Although the series was left out, critics were positive enough with the 14–20-minute pilot presentation. E! Online describe it as the "Best Pilot you may never see" and that "if the CW ever wants us to take it seriously as a trademark network of our generation, it needs to branch out from its usual routine of picking up shows geared for a younger audience. The Body Politic is a cure to that problem".

=== The 100 ===
On May 9, 2013, it was announced that CW ordered The 100, developed by Rothenberg and based on first novel in the book series of the same name by Kass Morgan. The series premiered on Wednesday, March 19, 2014, and was watched by an estimated 2.7 million American viewers, and received an 18–49 rating of 0.9. It is considered the most-watched show in its time-slot on The CW since 2010 with the series Life Unexpected. On Rotten Tomatoes, the show's first season had 72% of professional reviewers reviewing it positively, with a consensus of "Although flooded with stereotypes, the suspenseful atmosphere helps make The 100 a rare high-concept guilty pleasure." On Metacritic, the first season scores 63 out of 100 points. Rothenberg stated that he "wanted to do a show with a Lord of the Flies theme"

The second season premiered on Wednesday, October 23, 2014, and received an 18–49 rating of 0.5 with 1.54 million American viewers, which was less than the final episode of season one. However the second season was met with more favorable reviews, holding a rating of 100% on Rotten Tomatoes. IGN also gave the show a more positive review. IGN editor Eric Goldman writes, "Overcoming most of its early growing pains pretty quickly, The 100 was a very strong show by the end of its first season. But Season 2 elevated the series into the upper echelon, as the show become one of the coolest and most daring series on TV these days."

On January 11, 2015, The CW renewed the series for a third season. In this season, Lexa, a lesbian character, was controversially killed. After criticism by fans and critics, Rothenberg posted an apology letter.

The series continued into its seventh season, with its final episode being written and directed by Rothenberg and airing on September 30, 2020. Rothenberg was credited as the writer for sixteen of the one-hundred episodes of the series.

The 100 episodes written by Jason Rothenberg:

- "Pilot" (Season 1, Episode 1)
- "Earth Skills" (Season 1, Episode 2)
- "We Are Grounders, Part Two" (Season 1, Episode 13)
- "The 48" (Season 2, Episode 1)
- "Blood Must Have Blood, Part Two" (Season 2, Episode 16)
- "Wanheda, Part One" (Season 3, Episode 1)
- "Perverse Instantiation, Part Two" (Season 3, Episode 16)
- "Echoes" (Season 4, Episode 1)
- "Praimfaya" (Season 4, Episode 13)
- "Eden" (Season 5, Episode 1)
- "Damocles, Part Two" (Season 5, Episode 13)
- "Sanctum" (Season 6, Episode 1)
- "The Blood of Sanctum" (Season 6, Episode 13)
- "From the Ashes" (Season 7, Episode 1)
- "Anaconda" (Season 7, Episode 8)
- "The Last War" (Season 7, Episode 16) (also director)

=== Searchers ===
In October 2016, Deadline reported that The CW bought the rights of to the new Rothenberg and Greg Berlanti project Searchers, but by May 2017, Deadline reported that CW has opted not to proceed with the pilot.

== Filmography ==
=== Film ===
Title	Year	Notes
Original Intent	1992	Key set production assistant
American Cuisine	1998	Key production assistant
Julien Donkey-Boy	1999	Production office coordinator

=== Television ===
The numbers in directing and writing credits refer to the number of episodes.

Title	Year	Credited as				Network	Notes
Title	Year	Creator	Director	Writer	Executive producer	Network	Notes
Body Politic	2009	Yes	Yes	No	Yes	The CW	Unsold pilot
The 100	2014–20	Developer	Yes (1)	Yes (16)	Yes	The CW	
Searchers	2017	Yes	Yes	No	Yes	The CW	Unsold pilot
