= Kass Morgan =

American author and editor (born 1984)

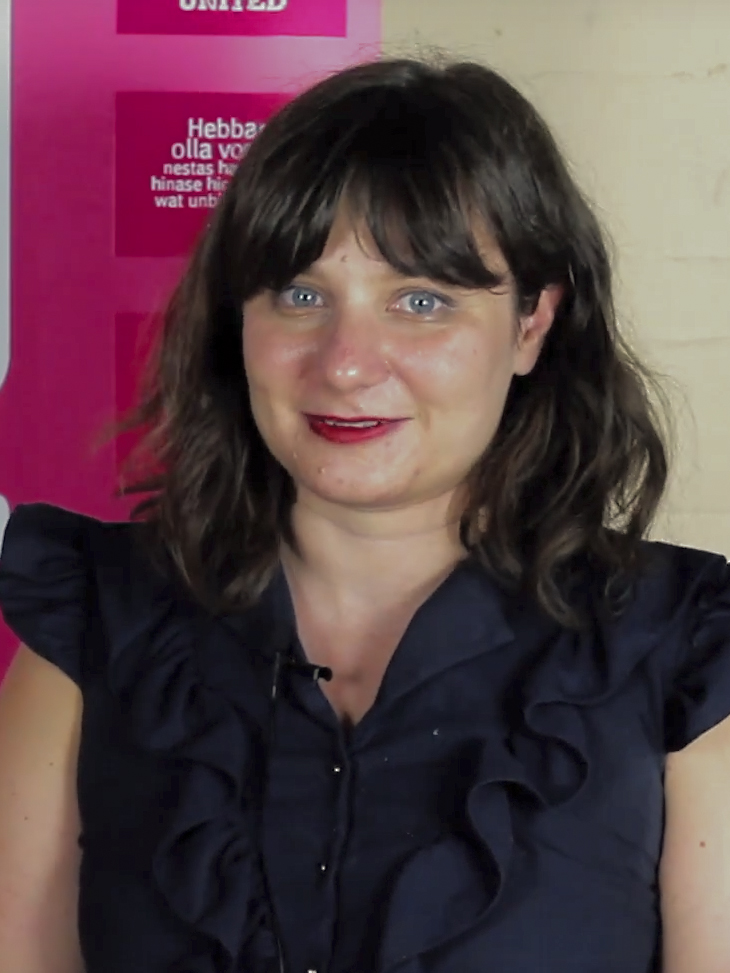
- Kass Morgan (2018)
- Born: July 21, 1984 (age 42); New York City, U.S.
- Education: Brown University; Oxford University
- Occupations: Author, editor
- Writing career
- Language: English
- Genres: Young adult, dystopian, science fiction, post-apocalyptic
- Notable work: The 100

Mallory A. Kass (born July 21, 1984), better known by the pen name Kass Morgan, is an American author and editor, best known as the author of The 100, a dystopian science fiction book series for young adult readers. She attended Brown University, studying English and History, and later earned a Master's at Oxford in 19th century literature. She currently lives in New York City and works as a senior editor at Scholastic. She appeared as a contestant on Jeopardy! on May 10, 2022.

== Bibliography ==
=== The 100 series ===
- The 100 (2013)
- Day 21 (2014)
- Homecoming (2015)
- Rebellion (2016)

=== Light Years series ===
- Light Years (2018)
- Supernova (2019)

=== The Ravens series ===
This series is written with Danielle Paige

- The Ravens (2020)
- The Monarchs (2022)

=== Standalone novels ===
- Save the Date (2026) (Published under the name Mallory Kass)
- Royal Summer (2026)
