= List of The 100 episodes =

The 100 is an American post-apocalyptic science fiction drama television series developed by Jason Rothenberg, which premiered on March 19, 2014, on The CW. It is loosely based on a 2013 book of the same name, the first in a book series by Kass Morgan. The series follows a group of teens as they become the first people from a space habitat to return to Earth after a devastating nuclear apocalypse. During the course of the series, 100 episodes of The 100 aired over seven seasons, between March 19, 2014, and September 30, 2020.

== Series overview ==
Season	Episodes	Originally released		Rank	Viewers (millions)
Season	Episodes	First released	Last released	Rank	Viewers (millions)
1	13	March 19, 2014	June 11, 2014	150	2.59
2	16	October 22, 2014	March 11, 2015	157	2.46
3	16	January 21, 2016	May 19, 2016	165	1.94
4	13	February 1, 2017	May 24, 2017	158	1.47
5	13	April 24, 2018	August 7, 2018	182	1.61
6	13	April 30, 2019	August 6, 2019	165	1.30
7	16	May 20, 2020	September 30, 2020	TBA	TBA

== Episodes ==
=== Season 1 (2014) ===
No. overall	No. in season	Title	Directed by	Written by	Original release date	Prod. code	U.S. viewers (millions)
1	1	"Pilot"	Bharat Nalluri	Jason Rothenberg	March 19, 2014	296843	2.73
Set in an indeterminate year in the future, 97 years after a nuclear apocalypse has devastated the surface of Earth, all known humans are residents of merged orbiting space stations known as the "Ark". 100 juvenile delinquents are sent to Earth's surface to test its habitability, having been given vitals-monitoring wristbands and instructions to proceed directly to Mount Weather. Among them is 17-year-old Clarke Griffin (Eliza Taylor), the daughter of the Ark's chief medical officer, Dr. Abby Griffin (Paige Turco). The 100 discover a lush Earth filled with new wonders and dangers. Clarke and four others search for the former Mount Weather Emergency Operations Center, a possible site of supplies. Ultimately, they discover that there are hostile survivors on the ground when Jasper, one of their party, is speared. The other delinquents remain at the landing site and, under the leadership of Bellamy (Bob Morley), celebrate their new world. Back on the Ark, Chancellor Jaha (Isaiah Washington) has been shot, causing the merciless and unsympathetic Councilman Kane (Henry Ian Cusick) to take charge. After Abby uses too many supplies to save Jaha, Kane attempts to execute her but, Jaha recovers in time to issue Abby a pardon.
2	2	"Earth Skills"	Dean White	Jason Rothenberg	March 26, 2014	2J7052	2.27
Chancellor Jaha recovers and learns of his son Wells' supposed fate on the ground. Abby recruits Raven, a zero-gravity mechanic, to fix a drop pod to send herself to the ground. On Earth, Clarke, Wells, Murphy, and Bellamy set out to rescue Jasper, who was taken by the grounders after being attacked. They find Jasper tied to a tree and manage to return to camp with him, in addition to a panther they killed prior his rescue. Bellamy forces the 100 to trade their wristbands for food. Clarke and Finn manage to keep them. As the Ark watches more wristbands going offline believing they are dying, a figure watches the 100 from above the camp.
3	3	"Earth Kills"	Dean White	Elizabeth Craft & Sarah Fain	April 2, 2014	2J7053	1.90
In flashbacks, Clarke's engineer father Jake discovers a life support problem with the Ark, is arrested for threatening to tell the people and "floated" by Jaha. In the present, Clarke, Finn, and Wells search for antibiotic seaweed to treat Jasper's infected wounds. Bellamy assembles a hunting group who are followed by Charlotte, a troubled 13-year-old whose parents were executed by Jaha. A lethal acidic fog hits, forcing Clarke, Finn, and Wells to seek shelter. The three talk, and Clarke berates Wells for his apparent part in her father's execution believing he told his father of Clarke's father's intent to commit treason. Bellamy and Charlotte take refuge from the fog; he comforts her when she has a nightmare. One of the 100 is fatally burned by the fog, forcing Clarke to mercy kill him; she subsequently succeeds in saving Jasper. Clarke discovers her mother's culpability in her father's death, learning that she actually told Thelonious, knowing her father would be floated. Clarke and Wells reconcile. Later, Charlotte's misinterpretation of Bellamy's advice leads her to kill Wells.
4	4	"Murphy's Law"	P. J. Pesce	T. J. Brady & Rasheed Newson	April 9, 2014	2J7054	1.69
Monty attempts to use the wristbands to contact the Ark. Octavia and Jasper discover Murphy's knife outside the wall with two fingers, which are Wells'. Clarke publicly accuses Murphy, inciting a mob that begins hanging him. Overwhelmed, Charlotte confesses and Murphy is cut down. Charlotte flees camp with Clarke and Finn, and they take refuge in a bunker, pursued by a revenge-seeking Murphy. Feeling guilty, Charlotte attempts to turn herself in, but Bellamy intercepts her. The whole group ends up at a dead-end cliff where Charlotte jumps off and commits suicide, and Bellamy banishes Murphy; the incident brings the formerly feuding Clarke and Bellamy together as a strong leadership front for the 100. Monty accidentally fries all of the wristbands. Finn runs to the bunker in frustration, Clarke follows, and they have sex. On the Ark, Abby and Raven go to great lengths to acquire a pressure regulator, but Kane finds out and has Abby arrested. Raven launches off the Ark alone and prepares to enter the atmosphere.
5	5	"Twilight's Last Gleaming"	Milan Cheylov	Bruce Miller	April 16, 2014	2J7055	1.80
Raven, unconscious, has made it to the ground. Bellamy reaches her pod first and throws away her radio as he was the one to shoot Jaha and fears repercussions from his actions. Clarke and Finn follow, and help Raven, who is revealed to be Finn's girlfriend, leaving Clarke devastated. They catch up with Bellamy and tell him of the 300 people to be culled from the Ark to preserve oxygen. He helps locate the radio, but it cannot be repaired in time, so they devise a plan to fire "flare" rockets that the Ark will see, confirming that Earth is survivable. On the Ark, the approved plan calls for sealing off and deoxygenating Section 17. A desperate Abby reveals her husband's discovery to the Ark, causing some residents to volunteer for the culling. After the culling, Abby, imprisoned, and Jaha watch in surprise as the "flare" rockets appear in the viewport above Abby's cell. Octavia is captured by a grounder.
6	6	"His Sister's Keeper"	Wayne Rose	Tracy Bellomo & Dorothy Fortenberry	April 23, 2014	2J7056	1.97
In flashbacks, Bellamy witnesses Octavia's birth. Due to the Ark's one child rule, Octavia is forced to live beneath the floor of her family's quarters. When Octavia is 16, Bellamy takes her to a masked ball for Unity Day. She is caught, and their mother is floated. A year later, Commander Shumway convinces Bellamy to assassinate Jaha in exchange for a place on the dropship with his sister. In the present, Bellamy assembles a search party for Octavia, and they leave for the woods. The group is ambushed by grounders, resulting in three deaths before they are suddenly called off by a foghorn. Clarke and Raven travel to Finn's bunker in hopes of finding a radio transmitter with which to contact the Ark, and Raven discovers Finn's involvement with Clarke. Bellamy, Finn, and Jasper rescue Octavia who has been protected by the grounder who captured her. Finn discovers that the grounder was the one who called off the attack. Seconds after that the grounder stabs him. Jasper hits the grounder unconscious. As a storm approaches, Clarke warns that she can only save Finn with her mother's help and they must repair the radio.
7	7	"Contents Under Pressure"	John Showalter	Akela Cooper & Kira Snyder	April 30, 2014	2J7057	1.88
In the midst of a hurricane on the ground, Finn is near death from a poisoned stab wound. Bellamy, having captured the grounder who stabbed Finn, tortures him for the antidote but he does not speak. Raven successfully connects with the Ark; Abby assists Clarke with treating Finn. Octavia convinces the grounder to reveal the antidote by poisoning herself with the same blade. On the Ark, Abby is released due to the unexpected support of Kane, but is removed from the Council as punishment for her actions. Replacing her is the former chancellor, Diana Sydney, whose intentions are questionable. After learning that Earth is habitable, the Ark begins preparations for Project Exodus: their re-colonization of Earth. However, their dropships can only carry about 25% of the Ark's population. In addition, residual tension from the culling causes mistrust in the Council. Clarke finally confronts her mother who insists that she only intended to have Jaha talk Clarke's father out of his plan, not execute him.
8	8	"Day Trip"	Matt Barber	Story by : Andrei Haq; Teleplay by : Elizabeth Craft & Sarah Fain	May 7, 2014	2J7058	1.64
Video connection is established with the Ark. the Ark informs the 100 of a nearby underground depot that may serve as a winter home. Bellamy and Clarke investigate and discover a stockpile of weapons and supplies. Dax, whom Commander Shumway is coercing to kill Bellamy, follows them. Octavia takes advantage of the camp's suffering from the effects of hallucinogenic nuts gathered as rations and frees the grounder, whose name is Lincoln. Bellamy, also hallucinating, is wracked with guilt for the culling and almost killed by Dax; Bellamy manages to kill Dax with Clarke's help. Clarke appeals to Jaha to pardon Bellamy for his crime using his actions on the ground; Jaha agrees in exchange for the name of the person who hired Bellamy. This leads to the arrest and imprisonment of Shumway. He is visited by Diana Sydney, and it is revealed that Jaha's assassination was her idea. Diana then has Shumway killed in his cell and framed to look like a suicide.
9	9	"Unity Day"	John Behring	Kim Shumway & Kira Snyder	May 14, 2014	2J7059	1.73
"Unity Day" arrives, when the joining of the orbiting space stations is celebrated. As the 100 celebrate, they find their video link interrupted when a bomb explodes during the ceremony on the Ark. Diana engineers a mutiny in order to hijack the first dropship. As the ship launches, it is not fully disconnected from the Ark's main systems, causing an Ark-wide power outage and disabling every dropship. On the ground, in an effort to initiate peace, Finn arranges a meeting with the local grounder leader through Lincoln. Clarke represents the group and goes to the meeting, where she meets Anya, a grounder leader. Anya reveals that the 100's "flares" burned down a grounder village, causing the grounders to desire their destruction despite it having been an accident. Jasper, who along with Bellamy is monitoring the meeting from cover, believes he sees the grounder spotters in the trees about to shoot, he opens fire, and the meeting dissolves into battle. That night, Clarke and Bellamy see the dropship descending. It comes in too fast with no parachute and violently crashes in the distance.
10	10	"I Am Become Death"	Omar Madha	T. J. Brady & Rasheed Newson	May 21, 2014	2J7060	1.46
The 100 discover no survivors at the Exodus dropship. Murphy returns to the dropship after being captured and tortured by the grounders for information about the group. Shortly afterwards, a viral hemorrhagic fever spreads through the camp and Clarke realizes the grounders used Murphy as a form of biological warfare. Bellamy, Raven and Clarke all contract the disease though Octavia and Finn are immune. Octavia learns from Lincoln that this is his people's way of softening the battlefield and that the virus will soon pass; Lincoln intends to flee the area and warns of Mountain Men who will be after them. Raven builds a bomb to delay the coming attack, but collapses from the virus before it can be detonated; Finn rescues Raven while Jasper detonates the bomb just in time with Monty's help. Later, Murphy smothers Connor as revenge for his part in Murphy's hanging. Raven breaks up with Finn after realizing that he's in love with Clarke. At least three of the 100 die of the virus, but the rest begin to recover.
11	11	"The Calm"	Mairzee Almas	Bruce Miller	May 28, 2014	2J7061	1.71
Monty discovers a strange signal on the Exodus dropship's black box that apparently caused it to crash. After a fire destroys most of the food supply, the group sends out hunting parties to restock. Clarke, Finn, and Myles go out together, but Clarke and Finn are captured and brought to the grounder camp. Anya instructs Clarke to save Tris, her second, a young girl who was injured in the bomb blast. Clarke tries to save her but is unsuccessful. In revenge, Finn is taken away to be executed. Clarke escapes by killing her guard and runs. Bellamy, Raven, Octavia, and Monty search for the missing party and find Myles, hurt in the woods. Monty mysteriously disappears after hearing a strange signal on their hand radios. Kane awakens on a devastated Ark. He searches for survivors and saves engineer Wick, then he realizes Jaha is alive in the Earth Monitoring Station and trying to bring systems online. With over half the Ark's populace likely dead, they discover that there are survivors in an access bay to the exodus ship. With Wick's help, Kane braves the extreme heat in a maintenance tunnel to reach the survivors—including Abby.
12	12	"We Are Grounders – Part I"	Dean White	Tracy Bellmo & Akela Cooper	June 4, 2014	2J7062	1.58
Clarke is recaptured by Anya, and they encounter a grounder named Tristan, who assumes command. Clarke is saved by Lincoln and taken to a very much alive Finn. Lincoln leads the two through a network of tunnels occupied by the reapers, cannibalistic humanoids the grounders themselves are afraid of. Lincoln seemingly sacrifices himself so Clarke and Finn can live to warn the others, including Octavia. Back at the dropship, Murphy has taken Jasper hostage. Bellamy trades himself for Jasper. While Raven attempts to open the dropship door, Murphy shoots his gun aimlessly at the floor after hearing a gasp, accidentally shooting her. Murphy prepares to hang Bellamy. She finally succeeds in opening the door only to find Bellamy dangling, but is able to rescue him. Murphy retreats to the upper level, Murphy blows a hole in the ship with gunpowder and escapes with a radio. A returned Clarke convinces the group to flee the camp for the ocean where they'll be safe. On the Ark, with the dropships no longer functional, Jaha realizes that the only way to save the rest of the citizens is by bringing the Ark and its people to the ground.
13	13	"We Are Grounders – Part II"	Dean White	Jason Rothenberg	June 11, 2014	2J7063	1.68
The 100 are ambushed by grounder scouts and forced to retreat to camp. The remaining citizens of the Ark prepare to return to Earth. After a technical failure to jettison requires manual intervention, Jaha remains on the Ark to an inevitable suffocation in one to two weeks when air runs out. Mecha Station, with Abby and Kane, makes it to the ground. Back at the dropship, Tristan leads the grounders' attack. The 100 mount their defense. Octavia is injured and leaves with Lincoln. Most of the 100 retreat into the dropship; Anya leaps in after them and is subdued. As previously planned, Jasper manages to activate the dropship's rockets; the massive fireball kills all 300 of the grounders, and apparently Finn and Bellamy. When the 100 emerge from the dropship, gas grenades drop at their feet, and they all pass out. Clarke wakes up in a white room. Through the window in her door she sees Monty locked in an identical room across the hallway. A sign next to his door reads "Mount Weather Quarantine Ward".

=== Season 2 (2014–15) ===
No. overall	No. in season	Title	Directed by	Written by	Original release date	Prod. code	U.S. viewers (millions)
14	1	"The 48"	Dean White	Jason Rothenberg	October 22, 2014	3J5251	1.55
Finding Monty gone from his cell, Clarke breaks out and discovers she is trapped in an underground complex inside Mount Weather. She discovers that an entire population of humans has survived but are unable to go outside because they have never built up resistance to radiation. After meeting their leader, Clarke and the 47 remaining members of the 100 are invited to stay in Mount Weather. Distrusting him, she makes a break for freedom but is stopped by Jasper; she proceeds to plot an escape. A vengeful Tristan hunts the few members of the 100 that avoided capture; Abby, Kane and the Ark survivors save them and kill Tristan. At the dropship, an injured and dying Raven kills a grounder survivor and is tended to by a remorseful Murphy who reveals his tragic background; they are later found by the Ark survivors and the kids they had rescued. The group returns to the newly established Camp Jaha. Separated from everyone else, Lincoln tries to save a poisoned Octavia, but with no antidote, he is forced to take her to his village, knowing it will mean certain death if he is caught.
15	2	"Inclement Weather"	John F. Showalter	Michael Angeli	October 29, 2014	3J5252	1.48
Chancellor Jaha discovers a baby left on the Ark and plans to take him to Earth. While a suspicious Clarke confronts Dante, Octavia is healed by Nyko, a friend of Lincoln's. Octavia holds Nyko hostage and offers him to Indra, the village leader, to get Lincoln back. Abby performs surgery on Raven to remove the bullet from her spine without anaesthesia. Jaha learns that the baby is a hallucination of his son caused by oxygen deprivation, who convinces him to continue living his life; Jaha crash lands a nuclear missile carrying him to Earth. During the prisoner exchange, Octavia is attacked by the reapers, who capture Lincoln. Clarke learns that Anya — the leader of the grounders — is being held in Mount Weather with other prisoners being forced to supply blood to heal the mountain residents.
16	3	"Reapercussions"	Dean White	Aaron Ginsburg & Wade McIntyre	November 5, 2014	3J5253	1.68
Clarke and Anya escape Mount Weather into the reaper tunnels. Abby is punished for supplying guns to Finn. Bellamy and the others leave Camp Jaha to search for their friends. Octavia joins Indra's hunting party to follow the reapers and retrieve Lincoln but he is not among the grounders they intercept. In Mount Weather, Jasper and Monty worry about Clarke's whereabouts. Kane goes after Finn, Bellamy and the others and appoints Abby chancellor in his absence. Clarke and Anya risk their lives to escape the tunnels, then Anya takes Clarke hostage. Lincoln is shown to be in Mount Weather, and it is revealed that the reapers work with the mountain men, bringing prisoners to Mount Weather and being fed dead grounders.
17	4	"Many Happy Returns"	P. J. Pesce	Kim Shumway	November 12, 2014	3J5254	1.75
Chancellor Jaha is found in a desert and rescued by a boy named Zoran, living with his parents who left their people in search of a place in the "dead zone" called the "City of Light". Searching for their friends, Finn, Bellamy and the others find a survivor from the Ark — Mel — who is saved by Bellamy after Sterling dies while trying to rescue her. While Clarke and Anya are on the run from mountain men, Raven starts working in the camp again alongside Wick, who has made her a brace for her leg. Octavia finally reunites with Bellamy and the others. Chancellor Jaha is forced to leave Zoran and his parents when Zoran's father trades him for a horse. On their way out of the woods, Clarke and Anya arrive at Camp Jaha. At the end, Ark soldiers shoot and kill Anya and knock out Clarke, after mistaking her for a hostile grounder.
18	5	"Human Trials"	Ed Fraiman	Charlie Craig	November 19, 2014	3J5255	1.64
Clarke is brought into Camp Jaha and, after receiving medical attention from Abby, is reunited with Bellamy, Octavia, and Raven. They go after Finn and Murphy. Kane is hoping to find peace with the grounders but instead is imprisoned at the grounder camp, where he discovers Jaha is also a prisoner. Lincoln is being held at Mount Weather where he is the subject of experiments involving a red drug that turns grounders into reapers. Jasper takes extreme measures to save Maya from radiation exposure by allowing a blood transfusion conducted by Dr. Tsing. After Maya's successful treatment, Dr. Tsing and Cage – Dante's son and Lincoln's torturer – ask President Wallace for permission to move forward with trials on the 47. He refuses. Elsewhere, Finn holds an entire grounder village hostage while searching for Clarke. Clarke, Bellamy, and Octavia arrive in time to see Finn gun down 18 grounders.
19	6	"Fog of War"	Steven DePaul	Kira Snyder	December 3, 2014	3J5256	1.86
Two days after the massacre, Raven discovers that Mount Weather has been jamming communications which caused the crash of the Exodus drop ship. Leaving camp to investigate, Bellamy and Octavia discover that Lincoln has become a reaper. Clarke still has not spoken to Finn. Raven manages to listen in on Mount Weather's radio broadcasts and discovers that the acid fog from before is a weapon of the mountain. In Mount Weather, Wallace wants Jasper to find volunteers to provide blood for the mountain residents but he fails. Maya discovers the radiation leak she was caught in was no accident and confides in Jasper about the mountain's caged grounders. In captivity, Jaha and Kane are told that one of them must kill the other to gain an audience with the Commander. Kane attempts to take his own life rather than kill Jaha but a grounder witness, named Lexa, reveals herself to be the Commander and says that she believes their wish for peace is sincere. She sends Jaha to Camp Jaha with a message; leave within two days, or die.
20	7	"Long into an Abyss"	Antonio Negret	James Thorpe	December 10, 2014	3J5257	1.62
With the grounders' deadline imminent, Abby and Jaha disagree over what the survivors are to do; Jaha wishes to evacuate to the so called "City of Light", while Abby wants to remain behind to rescue the 47. Clarke, Octavia, and Bellamy hold the reaper-state Lincoln in the drop ship and learn he was drugged and experimented on. Lincoln's heart stops but is restarted by Clarke, who believes there is a way to cure reapers – information they can use with the grounders. When Abby cures Lincoln, Lexa grants Clarke the truce but demands Finn's execution for the massacre before it can begin. In Mount Weather, Jasper, Monty, Miller and Harper discover that there are Ark survivors on the ground. Dr. Tsing learns that for the mountain residents to live on the surface, they would have to kill the 47 for their bone marrow. Though Wallace vetoes the plan, his son Cage goes behind his back and begins the process with Harper.
21	8	"Spacewalker"	John F. Showalter	Bruce Miller	December 17, 2014	3J5258	1.40
Clarke returns to camp with knowledge of the only way the grounders will accept a truce. Opinions are divided when Clarke reveals the grounders will cease their attack if they are given Finn. Flashbacks to the Ark reveal that Finn was imprisoned because he took the fall for Raven's illegal spacewalking. At Camp Jaha, Abby and a returned Kane think they can bargain with the grounders by offering to put Finn on trial, but such plans are for naught, as Finn ultimately turns himself in. In a last-ditch effort to save Finn, Clarke goes to meet with Lexa. When Lexa refuses clemency, Clarke asks to say goodbye. She approaches Finn, kisses him, and tells him that she loves him while stabbing him to death, saving him the brutal torture/execution of grounder custom.
22	9	"Remember Me"	Omar Madha	Dorothy Fortenberry	January 21, 2015	3J5259	1.48
Clarke and a group from the Ark accompany Finn's body to a grounder camp to complete their agreement for a truce. Clarke is haunted by visions of Finn. Bellamy fails to convince Clarke to let him go to Mount Weather as an inside man. At the village, Finn's corpse is burned along with those of the massacre victims. Kane gifts Lexa a bottle of liquor, which when tested appears poisoned, leading to the belief it was an assassination attempt by the Sky People. The grounders accuse and prepare to execute Raven but Clarke and Bellamy pinpoint Gustus, Lexa's right hand, as the culprit. Later, Clarke changes her mind and sends Bellamy, along with Lincoln, to infiltrate Mount Weather.
23	10	"Survival of the Fittest"	Dean White	Akela Cooper	January 28, 2015	3J5260	1.53
Clarke and Lexa encounter a gigantic mutated gorilla after one of the grounder council members drives Clarke into the forest with the intent to kill her. They escape it but become temporarily trapped in its cage and Lexa is injured. Clarke figures out a way to escape and has an idea about freeing the grounders inside Mount Weather to act as an insider army. Bellamy and Lincoln plan their infiltration of Mount Weather en route to the reaper tunnels but upon arrival Lincoln is overcome by his addiction, leaving Bellamy to a questionable fate. Murphy helps Jaha confront his past, while Jaha persuades Murphy that the Sky People have nothing to offer him and that his best option is to search for the mystical "City of Light". Jaha then leaves the camp with over a dozen Ark survivors, with Murphy tagging along, to search for the "City of Light". After witnessing Octavia's determination and unwavering spirit to fight, Indra offers to make Octavia her second in command but Kane warns Octavia that once the war ends it is likely that the grounders and Sky People will end up breaking their alliance.
24	11	"Coup de Grace"	P. J. Pesce	Charlie Craig	February 4, 2015	3J5261	1.51
Bellamy is caged in Mount Weather along with numerous grounders. Jasper's search for Monty and Harper remains fruitless, so he confronts the President about their disappearance. Cage sends snipers to assassinate Clarke and Lexa; they are intercepted and one is captured for questioning. Maya discovers Bellamy being harvested for blood and saves him with help from an imprisoned grounder named Echo; he makes contact with Clarke. President Wallace and Jasper discover Dr. Tsing's illegal experiments on Harper and Monty. Cage ousts his father as President and orders a lockdown for the surviving 47 teens. Realizing she has to draw attention to the outside for Bellamy's sake, Clarke sends Emerson, their captive, back to Mount Weather with a message boasting about the army that is coming for them.
25	12	"Rubicon"	Mairzee Almas	Aaron Ginsburg & Wade McIntyre	February 11, 2015	3J5262	1.36
An unmasked Cage rescues Emerson on the surface, revealing the success of the bone marrow experiments. In the dormitory, Jasper tells the others of Bellamy's presence. Jaha, Murphy and his group encounter a strange woman, a scavenger and drifter named Emori, who offers to serve as guide to the City of Light through the "dead zone" desert. Emori is not who she appears to be. In Mount Weather, Bellamy seeks a way to help his friends; with the help of President Wallace, Bellamy irradiates several of the mountain men to death, including Dr. Tsing, allowing the 47 to escape. When Bellamy makes radio contact, Clarke and Raven overhear Cage's plan to bomb the planned peace conference in Tondc. Clarke races to the village, where she explains the danger to Lexa, who convinces Clarke that an evacuation would expose Bellamy's presence in the mountain; the two secretly escape. As they leave, Clarke sees her mother arrive in the village and returns to try to rescue Abby as the missile hits the village.
26	13	"Resurrection"	Dean White	Bruce Miller	February 18, 2015	3J5263	1.42
Clarke and Abby survive the missile strike on Tondc but Abby is horrified to realize that Clarke knew it was coming and did not evacuate the village. She goes back to help survivors, while Lexa and Clarke set off to find and kill the spotter who called in the strike and is still shooting. Lincoln saves Indra's life, while Octavia leads the other seconds in an effort to dig out survivors. Abby finds Kane pinned below rubble and struggles to free him, while they wonder whether they deserve to survive at all. Clarke finds and kills the spotter with Lincoln's help and realizes that the spotter's lack of a hazmat suit means the mountain men have started harvesting her friends. Inside Mount Weather, Jasper and the others fight back and find refuge with those in Mount Weather who do not agree with Cage.
27	14	"Bodyguard of Lies"	Uta Briesewitz	Kim Shumway	February 25, 2015	3J5264	1.55
Lexa decides to kill Octavia to protect the secret that she and Clarke knew about the missile strike in advance. Clarke stops her and Lexa reveals that she has feelings for Clarke. Bellamy, Raven and Wick find a way to disable the acid fog; Bellamy soon discovers it was a trick but radio contact has been cut and he has no way to warn the others. Lexa agrees to trust Clarke and not hurt Octavia; Clarke notes there is more to life than survival. Lexa kisses Clarke who says that she isn't ready for a relationship. On Raven's signal that the fog is disabled, Clarke and Lexa lead the army to Mount Weather. Bellamy manages to destroy the acid fog system just as the mountain men are deploying it. Elsewhere, Jaha, Murphy, and crew continue to search for the City of Light. They take casualties crossing a minefield and reach a lake where a mysterious boat appears.
28	15	"Blood Must Have Blood, Part One"	Omar Madha	Aaron Ginsburg & Wade McIntyre	March 4, 2015	3J5265	1.49
Bellamy is letting the grounders imprisoned inside Mount Weather out of their cages as Cage starts to raid the complex for the 47. Some of them are temporarily captured but freed again by Bellamy, Jasper and Maya, who bring them to the harvest chamber. Soldiers soon raid the harvest chamber too, taking the 47 prisoner once again. Cage visits his father, desperately hoping he will tell him a way to stop the incoming attack. Raven and Wick destroy the mountain's generators and the lock on Mount Weather's door is disabled. When they pull the door open. Lexa commands her people to stand down – she has made a deal with Emerson, her people will be freed if the grounder army retreats leaving the Sky People left for dead. It is later learned that this was Dante's suggestion. When the grounders retreat, almost all the Sky People accept defeat and soon leave too, leaving behind only Clarke at the front door and Octavia in the tunnels.
29	16	"Blood Must Have Blood, Part Two"	Dean White	Jason Rothenberg	March 11, 2015	3J5266	1.34
Clarke joins Octavia in the tunnels and is let into Mount Weather by Bellamy. With the 47 waiting for bone marrow extraction, Clarke and Bellamy take Dante hostage. When Cage still refuses to stop, Clarke shoots his father, which leads Cage to begin bone marrow extraction on Abby. Seeing no other option, Clarke has Monty hack into Mount Weather's air filtration system and she and Bellamy irradiate the mountain, killing the entire population, including Maya. Cage escapes but comes upon Lincoln, who injects Cage with the reaper drug, killing him, leaving Emerson, who also escaped, as the last Mountain Man. Everyone returns to Camp Jaha but Clarke, wracked with guilt over the deaths of hundreds of people, leaves. Jaha and Murphy arrive at an island where they separate. Murphy finds a lighthouse inside of which he watches a video recording (dated May 10, 2052) of the previous occupant who says she "got the launch codes", before shooting himself. In the final scene, Jaha finds a well kept mansion, surrounded by flying drones, where he meets an A.I., named "A.L.I.E.", in the hologram form of an attractive dark-haired woman wearing a red dress, who thanks him for his "gift", the nuclear warhead from the missile he used to land on Earth.

=== Season 3 (2016) ===
No. overall	No. in season	Title	Directed by	Written by	Original release date	Prod. code	U.S. viewers (millions)
30	1	"Wanheda: Part One"	Dean White	Jason Rothenberg	January 21, 2016	3J5751	1.88
For the past three months, Clarke has been living on her own in the woods. At a grounder trading post, Clarke sleeps with the post owner, Niylah, and is caught by a bounty hunter while leaving the next morning. At Camp Jaha, renamed Arkadia, Lincoln – unable to leave camp due to a kill order put on him by Lexa – tries to fit in with the Sky People, much to Octavia's distaste. Bellamy, with several others, goes on patrol and encounters scouts from another grounder clan called the Ice Nation. Jasper is injured, and part of the group returns to Arkadia. The rest meet up with Kane and Indra, from whom they learn there is a bounty on Clarke (who is known in the grounder circles as "Wanheda"; the Commander of Death) for the mass killings of the population of Mount Weather. They leave to search for Clarke, but the solar powered Rover ATV they are using gets trapped by a deliberately felled tree. Murphy is released from his bunker and finds Jaha and A.L.I.E. at the mansion. Murphy refuses to be a part of Jaha's mission but decides to leave the island with him when he sees that Emori is part of the boat crew.
31	2	"Wanheda: Part Two"	Mairzee Almas	Aaron Ginsburg & Wade McIntyre	January 28, 2016	3J5752	1.63
The attackers of the Rover ATV turn out to be fellow Ark members from Farm Station who landed separately, including Monty's mother, and under the control of Pike. Conflicts with the Ice Nation, in whose territory they landed, have reduced their numbers to 63. Pike and his group accept Kane's offer to come to Arkadia. Part of the group continues their search for Clarke, but after Bellamy is injured by the bounty hunter who has captured Clarke, the group is forced to return to base. Indra returns to the grounder city of Polis where the bounty hunter – revealed to be Prince Roan of Ice Nation – delivers Clarke to Lexa. Jaha continues his mission for A.L.I.E. While Otan distracts Jaha, Emori and (unwittingly) Murphy kill Gideon and steal a backpack containing A.L.I.E.'s portable nuclear powered hardware. When Otan returns he appears to be brainwashed, and Murphy throws the pack into the water. Emori and Murphy escape on the boat, while Jaha and Otan scramble to save the bag. A.L.I.E. reveals that no one can die in the City of Light, showing them Gideon – alive and unscarred – in the city.
32	3	"Ye Who Enter Here"	Antonio Negret	Kim Shumway	February 4, 2016	3J5753	1.57
Lexa reveals to Clarke that she intends to initiate the Sky People into her Coalition. Bellamy, his girlfriend Gina, Octavia, and Raven arrive at Mount Weather with supplies for the Farm Station refugees. There, Echo, the grounder Bellamy first freed from the cages beneath the mountain, appears and speaks of an Ice Nation plot to attack the summit in Polis. Bellamy, Pike, and Octavia leave for Polis. As they reach the summit, it is revealed there is no imminent threat to those present; the "warning" was a ruse to lure them away. An assassin infiltrates Mount Weather, kills Gina, and punches in the self-destruct code. Raven and Sinclair manage to kill the assassin and get the disarm code, but Mount Weather detonates, killing all 36 members of the Farm Station; only Raven and Sinclair survive. It is revealed that Echo is working with Queen Nia of the Ice Nation, who is helped by Emerson, the last survivor of Mount Weather, in carrying out its destruction.
33	4	"Watch the Thrones"	Ed Fraiman	Dorothy Fortenberry	February 11, 2016	3J5754	1.32
In a fight to the death for the right to the throne, Queen Nia chooses her son Prince Roan to fight Lexa. At Arkadia, Bellamy, wracked with guilt, resigns from the guard. Monty and Jasper leave camp, and Monty confronts his grieving friend. Pike publicly confronts Kane and Abby, questioning them about the grounder army surrounding Arkadia, sent as protection by Lexa. Pike convinces Bellamy to supply him with guns and help massacre the grounder army. Lincoln, Abby, and Kane stop them at the last minute. Pike's name is then suggested for inclusion on the ballot for the upcoming Chancellor vote. Back at Polis, Lexa beats Roan but kills Nia instead of him, and pronounces Roan the king of Ice Nation. Back at Arkadia, Pike is the elected Chancellor. Pike then frees himself, his supporters, and Bellamy, and they leave to finish what they started.
34	5	"Hakeldama"	Tim Scanlan	Charlie Craig	February 18, 2016	3J5755	1.36
Clarke, Lexa, and other grounders from Polis discover the fallen army of grounders, slain by Pike and his followers. Indra is found wounded and claims Bellamy persuaded Pike to let her live in order to tell Lexa that the Sky People reject the newly-formed coalition. Lexa allows Clarke's return to Arkadia to tell Bellamy and the others to step down. Clarke fails to convince Bellamy, but instead induces Lexa to end the cycle of violence in hopes of peace. Murphy and Emori set up traps to steal from passersby. Murphy is caught, and one of the grounders spots the pill Jaha gave him in "Wanheda: Part One"; he demands to know where Murphy found it. After arriving in Arkadia, Jaha and A.L.I.E. set out to recruit more people into the City of Light by giving out the pills. Devastated by her chronic agony, Raven decides to take the pill, which successfully removes her pain. She then sees A.L.I.E. for the first time.
35	6	"Bitter Harvest"	Dean White	Kira Snyder	February 25, 2016	3J5756	1.41
When King Roan has Emerson, the last Mountain Man, delivered to Polis, Clarke must decide his fate. Ultimately, she decides to let Lexa banish him. Octavia and Kane find out Pike intends to clear a nearby grounder village and utilize their fertile soil for crops, so Octavia rides to alert the village. The village set a deadly trap for the incoming Sky People, which Octavia manages to warn Bellamy about just in time. Abby confiscates the City of Light chips from Jaha when it becomes clear he has no recollection of his son. A.L.I.E. enlists Raven's help to search the Ark for her second iteration, A.L.I.E. 2.0. They are unable to find it, which leads to the realization that it may be on the mythical 13th station, named Polaris, that got shot out of orbit before joining the rest of the Ark. Titus, the Flamekeeper, tortures Murphy for information, alongside an escape pod with two letters clearly scorched off from re-entry that, with the other marked letters, spells Polaris.
36	7	"Thirteen"	Dean White	Javier Grillo-Marxuach	March 3, 2016	3J5757	1.39
Murphy convinces Titus to tell him more about the origin of his religion, speculating that the first Commander was from the 13th station rather than born on the ground. Flashbacks to 97 years earlier reveal that after A.L.I.E. causes the nuclear apocalypse by hacking all of the world's computer launch codes, Becca – A.L.I.E.'s creator and avatar template – attempted to create A.L.I.E. 2.0 to interface more directly with humanity. When the Ark destroyed her research station Polaris, Becca injected herself with an unknown black substance while implanting the A.L.I.E. 2.0 in her neck, and traveled to Earth in an escape pod. In the present, Clarke and Lexa sleep together for the first time as they prepare to part ways in response to Lexa's decision to blockade Arkadia until Pike is removed from leadership. Titus attempts to ensure that the Sky People are destroyed by shooting Clarke and blaming Murphy for it, only he shoots Lexa accidentally. After Lexa dies, it is revealed that the A.L.I.E. 2.0 computer has been implanted in the back of her neck; Titus describes it as the spirit of the Commander.
37	8	"Terms and Conditions"	John Showalter	Charlie Craig	March 10, 2016	3J5758	1.20
Two grounders inform Arkadia of the blockade and state that it will only be lifted if Pike is surrendered to them. In response, Pike begins to plan for war, while Kane plans to hand Pike over to the grounders. To this end, Sinclair allows himself to be arrested. He and an interned Lincoln stage an argument in lock-up, creating a distraction for Kane to capture Pike. Bellamy and other guards intercept him at the gate. Raven convinces Jasper to help her break into Pike's office to recover the confiscated chip manufacturer. Jasper, mentioning Finn, prompts a realisation that Raven has no recollection of him at all, and they leave the device where it is. As Jaha reflects on his future plans, Pike decides to sentence Kane to death for treason, forcing Bellamy and Monty to re-evaluate which side they are truly on in the ever-escalating tensions towards war.
38	9	"Stealing Fire"	Uta Briesewitz	Heidi Cole McAdams	March 31, 2016	3J5759	1.23
In Polis, a conclave is held to decide the new Commander. Ontari, former bodyguard of Queen Nia, arrives and murders the other Nightbloods, declaring herself Commander. Titus names Clarke the new Flamekeeper and she takes the A.L.I.E. 2.0 computer chip, known to the grounders as "the Flame", to find Luna, a Nightblood friend of Lincoln. Titus kills himself to ensure Ontari cannot use him against Clarke, and Ontari swears Roan and Murphy to secrecy about the missing Flame. Bellamy goes to Octavia for help to save Kane, Lincoln, and Sinclair from execution, but is captured by Octavia and Indra. Abby, Octavia, Miller, and Harper stage an elaborate rescue, with last-minute help from Monty, whose betrayal of Pike is covered up by his mother. When Pike threatens to execute the interned grounders, Lincoln surrenders to save them, while the others escape Arkadia. Octavia watches from a distance as Pike executes Lincoln.
39	10	"Fallen"	Matt Barber	Charmaine DeGrate & Javier Grillo-Marxuach	April 7, 2016	3J5760	1.13
Acting as a fake Flamekeeper, Murphy helps Ontari convince the grounders to submit to her rule; she later rapes him. Pike discovers Monty's betrayal, forcing him to flee Arkadia. Monty rejoins Kane, Octavia, and a captive Bellamy at the dropship, but Pike's men capture them, and Bellamy offers to lead them to the rest of Kane's insurgents. Instead, he leads them to the grounder blockade and hands Pike over to them. Kane goes with the grounders to Polis. A.L.I.E.'s influence spreads throughout Arkadia as more people fall under the mind-controlling influence, and Raven enlists Abby and Jasper to help her destroy the chip inside her. A.L.I.E. restores Raven's pain to torture her into submission, and then uses her to coerce Abby to take the chip. Jasper, finding the whole of Arkadia in A.L.I.E.'s thrall, manages to escape with an unconscious Raven, encountering Clarke on the way out.
40	11	"Nevermore"	Ed Fraiman	Kim Shumway	April 14, 2016	3J5761	1.08
Clarke and Jasper regroup with Bellamy, Octavia, Monty, and Sinclair. They decide to carry out Raven's original plan to free herself from A.L.I.E.'s control: by building an electromagnetic pulse device (EMP) from one of The 100's old wristbands and frying the chip inside her. Clarke leads the group to Niylah's trading post, where there is a salvaged bracelet. Monty and Octavia return to the dropship to retrieve additional components for the EMP, but they are attacked by Monty's mother Hannah, now under A.L.I.E.'s control. Monty fatally shoots his mother to save Octavia, and they return to Niylah's, where they are able to destroy the chip inside Raven using the EMP and Clarke cuts out its liquefied remains using Titus' Flamekeeper kit. Raven reveals to the group that the Flame is the only thing that can stop A.L.I.E.
41	12	"Demons"	P. J. Pesce	Justine Juel Gillmer	April 21, 2016	3J5762	1.15
Clarke's group finds Arkadia abandoned and retrieves Lincoln's journal, which contains a map to Luna's location. A mysterious masked figure attacks Harper, Miller, and his boyfriend Bryan before they can reach Arkadia and then targets Clarke, who unmasks him as Carl Emerson. Emerson kills Sinclair, and traps everyone else in the airlock planning to force Clarke to watch them suffocate. Clarke uses the Flame to kill him and saves her friends. The group holds a funeral for Lincoln and Sinclair, after which Clarke, Bellamy, Octavia, and Jasper embark on a journey to find Luna, while the others remain to use Arkadia's mainframe to hack A.L.I.E. Emori arrives in Polis and reunites with Murphy. Jaha arrives with knowledge of Ontari's deception, revealing that Emori is under A.L.I.E.'s control. Ontari has Murphy arrested, and Jaha convinces her to take a chip. With Ontari in her thrall, A.L.I.E. now has mastery of both the Sky People and the grounders.
42	13	"Join or Die"	Dean White	Julie Benson & Shawna Benson	April 28, 2016	3J5763	1.27
Flashbacks depict Pike giving The 100 an Earth Skills crash-course in the two weeks prior to the events of the pilot episode. Realising the teens were being sent to the ground and failing to persuade Jaha to let him go with them, Pike beats Murphy in front of the class to incite them to fight for their survival. In the present, Kane and Pike arrive in an A.L.I.E.-controlled Polis and are taken prisoner by Ontari. While incarcerated, Pike is tortured by fellow prisoner Indra in revenge for the massacre of her people, but Murphy convinces her they must unite against A.L.I.E.'s followers. Jaha threatens Abby's life to coerce Kane into taking the chip. Clarke, Bellamy, Octavia, and Jasper arrive at the shore of a vast ocean and send a signal to Luna's people. After being drugged, they awaken aboard a disused oil rig and meet Luna of the boat people clan, who refuses to take the Flame.
43	14	"Red Sky at Morning"	P. J. Pesce	Lauren Muir & Kira Snyder	May 5, 2016	3J5764	1.13
At Arkadia, Harper and Monty sleep together while Raven hacks into the City of Light. She breaks through the firewalls but is blocked by the spirit of Hannah. Monty erases his mother's code, but A.L.I.E. removes herself from Arkadia before Raven can destroy her code; however, the attempt reveals that A.L.I.E. has a hidden kill switch that can end her. Murphy, Indra, and Pike escape the Polis dungeons and destroy A.L.I.E.'s core processor, but she has already migrated to the computer system on the Ark, still orbiting Earth. At the oil rig, Clarke plans to implant the Flame into Luna against her will, but is unsuccessful. Some of Luna's people return from the mainland having been taken over by A.L.I.E., and capture Jasper and Luna. After breaking free and killing her captors, Luna, knowing Clarke will stop at nothing to get her to accept the Flame, drugs Clarke and her companions, and has them returned to the mainland.
44	15	"Perverse Instantiation – Part One"	Ed Fraiman	Aaron Ginsburg & Wade McIntyre	May 12, 2016	3J5765	1.17
Clarke encounters Roan in the woods, and he agrees to help her infiltrate Polis to implant the Flame into Ontari as a last resort. In Arkadia, Jasper is revealed to have been put under A.L.I.E.'s control at the oil rig, and traps Monty and Raven, and takes Harper hostage. At Polis, Roan is shot by Kane and dragged away, while Clarke is captured and tortured by Abby. Murphy, Pike, and Indra rescue Bellamy and the rest of the group. Bellamy and Murphy then attempt to rescue Clarke while the others fight A.L.I.E.'s acolytes, during which Kane is almost killed in an explosion but is tackled aside by Indra, who is captured. Bellamy and Murphy arrive in time to save Clarke, but Jaha prevents them from using Ontari by inflicting a severe head wound that leaves her brain dead.
45	16	"Perverse Instantiation – Part Two"	Dean White	Jason Rothenberg	May 19, 2016	3J5766	1.29
At Arkadia, Monty rescues Harper and captures Jasper. With Ontari brain dead, Clarke frees Abby with the EMP to transfuse Ontari's Nightblood into herself so that she can use the Flame; as Clarke's friends defend her, Clarke enters the City of Light to find the kill switch though she has only a short time before A.L.I.E. absorbs the Flame and can delete the kill switch. Aided by the spirit of Lexa, summoned from the Flame by Clarke's mind, and hacking guidance from Raven, Clarke reaches the kill switch inside of a simulation of Polaris where she is greeted by the First Commander Becca and A.L.I.E. A.L.I.E. reveals that the world's abandoned nuclear power plants are melting down and releasing radiation, meaning that the Earth will be uninhabitable in the next six months and the City of Light is the only salvation. Clarke attempts to get A.L.I.E. to give people a real choice rather than force them to come, but Becca admits that A.L.I.E.'s core programming prevents such a thing from happening. Clarke proclaims that they will find another way and pulls the kill switch, destroying A.L.I.E. and freeing everyone. In the aftermath, Octavia kills Pike to avenge Lincoln's death and Clarke warns Bellamy that they haven't saved the world yet.

=== Season 4 (2017) ===
No. overall	No. in season	Title	Directed by	Written by	Original release date	Prod. code	U.S. viewers (millions)
46	1	"Echoes"	Dean White	Jason Rothenberg	February 1, 2017	T27.13251	1.21
Clarke confides in Bellamy about A.L.I.E.'s warning of the nuclear power plants melting down and the human race surviving only six more months. In the aftermath of the battle, it turns out that the people Lexa killed to protect Clarke in the City of Light are actually dead, leading the people of Polis to declare both Wanheda and Skaikru their enemies; Echo leads the Ice Nation warriors against Skaikru and begins to take the city by force. To stop her, Clarke and Abby manage to save King Roan from his bullet wound. When Roan awakens, Echo attempts to convince him to kill Clarke, but Clarke gives Roan the Flame; he declares himself ruler of the thirteen clans until the Flame chooses another commander, and he announces their peace with Skaikru. Murphy and Emori run away from everyone to be together; Clarke, Bellamy and Jaha leave Polis and return to Arkadia to decide their next move in their fight against the radiation that's coming. Elsewhere at Arkadia, Raven attempts to determine exactly what kind of damage the radiation will deliver while Jasper's suicide attempt is unknowingly interrupted by Monty. Using Arkadia's sensors and historical records, Raven determines that A.L.I.E. was telling the truth as radiation levels are already beginning to rise and the power plants were only designed to last for one hundred years without maintenance. At the same time, in Egypt, a radioactive pyroclastic wave kills two people, an effect of the approaching apocalypse.
47	2	"Heavy Lies the Crown"	Ed Fraiman	Justine Juel Gillmer	February 8, 2017	T27.13252	1.01
Ilian, a grounder who was under A.L.I.E.'s influence, kills his family to convince his mother to take the chip but the AI is destroyed before he can be forced to kill himself too. Soon after when his mother dies, she tells him to avenge her. In Polis, Kane and Abby sleep together, while Ambassador Raphael, together with Ilian, plans to challenge Roan. Roan prepares for battle despite being too weak from his injury. Kane and Octavia attempt to deter Raphael, but he refuses. Octavia later assassinates him, making it seem as if Raphael died of natural causes. At Arkadia, Raven, Clarke, Bellamy, Monty, Harper, Bryan, and Miller devise a plan to restore Alpha Station to survive the radiation and acquire a hydro-generator for water from Farm Station which is in the Ice Nation. Grounders meet them there and eventually agree to give them the generator. However, they find many of their own as slaves and vote amongst them to use the generator to make an explosion to free them. The leader of the grounders, Tybe, is the man who murdered Monty's father. Monty then frees the slaves who then beat Tybe to death. Everyone returns to Arkadia but with no way of supplying water for everyone. Clarke tells the people of the radiation crisis and they all agree to work together.
48	3	"The Four Horsemen"	P. J. Pesce	Heidi Cole McAdams	February 15, 2017	T27.13253	1.05
Jaha leads Clarke and Bellamy on a search for a bunker built by the Second Dawn doomsday cult that could be used to survive the coming death wave; however, they discover that the bunker wasn't shielded properly and everyone inside had died. A group of grounders, including Nyko and Luna, arrive at Arkadia with signs of acute radiation syndrome (ARS) from eating contaminated fish. Abby wants to use their radiation medicine, but Raven, who is now in charge of rationing, stops her. Murphy steals it and gives it to Abby anyway. The new Flamekeeper, Gaia, steals the Flame from King Roan, but before Octavia kills her Indra stops her, stating that she is her estranged daughter. Using a decoy, Octavia tells Roan the Flame was destroyed. At the same time, Ilian leads grounders in destroying all of the technology in Polis. Arkadia can only house 100 people for the next 5 years to ride out the radiation. Clarke writes a list and includes Bellamy as number 99, and he writes her name for the 100th spot. Luna is the only person who does not die from the ARS, which makes Abby realize that Luna's body is rejecting the radiation because of her Nightblood, offering a possible solution for everyone.
49	4	"A Lie Guarded"	Ian Samoil	Kim Shumway	February 22, 2017	T27.13254	1.00
In Polis, Kane and Bellamy are sentenced to die when Roan ends the alliance with both Skaikru and Trikru. Abby, Raven, Murphy and Luna return to A.L.I.E.'s island to discover how they can use Luna's Nightblood to save the human race from the radiation. Drones fire on them, resulting in Nyko's death and driving Luna to her breaking point. Echo hunts down Octavia and after a sword fight, Octavia is stabbed and falls off a cliff, but survives. Also, Monty and Jasper discover and expose Clarke's list of 100 names forcing Jaha to resolve the conflict.
50	5	"The Tinder Box"	John F. Showalter	Morgan Gendel	March 1, 2017	T27.13255	1.02
Raven and Abby discover that because they were released from A.L.I.E.'s control via EMP instead of when Clarke pulled the kill switch, that they have leftover knowledge from the AI in their brains. They learn that Becca was making Nightblood on the Ark and after they find a rocket, they prepare to go back to the Ark to make Nightblood for the survival of the human race. Ilian brings Octavia to Arkadia to sneak his way in. Octavia warns them of Roan's planned takeover of the ship and Clarke goes to negotiate with him. They eventually agree to share Arkadia 50–50 until Ilian blows up the ship and they all watch their last chance of survival burn to the ground.
51	6	"We Will Rise"	Dean White	Charmaine DeGrate	March 15, 2017	T27.13256	0.98
Clarke, Bellamy, and Roan go on a road trip to deliver ten barrels of hydrazine fuel to Raven for her trip to space to make Nightblood. The residents of Arkadia band against Ilian and want to execute him for destroying the ship but Kane tries to resolve the conflict peacefully. However, Octavia holds a gun to Ilian's head but is stopped at the last minute by Kane who points out that Lincoln had been murdered in a similar fashion; she has an emotional breakdown and leaves. Also, Clarke lets her lover, Niylah, stay at Arkadia for the time being. During the drive, a Trikru attack on Clarke, Bellamy, and Roan results in one of the hydrazine barrels being pierced by an arrow and emptied. Later as Raven hears the news, she suffers a seizure.
52	7	"Gimme Shelter"	Tim Scanlan	Terri Hughes Burton & Ron Milbauer	March 22, 2017	T27.13257	0.90
The black rain begins to fall, and as the Sky People shelter in the remains of Arkadia, Bellamy tries to rescue a father and son trapped outside, but is unable to reach them. Octavia and Ilian take refuge in a cave, but when he tries to get her to open up about Lincoln, she tries to go into the black rain and kill herself, but he stops her. They have sex, and she decides to go with him back to his family's abandoned farm. At the underground lab on Becca's island, Abby tells Clarke about her new plan to implant Luna's bone marrow into a test subject to see if it can create immunity, but to test this they would need to use a huge dose of radiation on the subject, which could kill them. When a grounder thief breaks into Becca's mansion and is captured, Emori identifies him as her nemesis Baylis. She intends to kill him, but Clarke decides to use him as the test subject. Emori later admits to Murphy that the thief is not Baylis, and that she lied to save herself from being sacrificed.
53	8	"God Complex"	Omar Madha	Lauren Muir	March 29, 2017	T27.13258	0.97
After the first test kills the thief, Emori's lie is discovered and she is taken prisoner, with the intention of using her as the next subject. Murphy also has to be tied up when he tries to stop them, and Luna is knocked out by Roan when she tries to leave. Clarke changes her mind and injects herself with Luna's bone marrow, becoming a Nightblood, but before she can subject herself to the radiation, Abby destroys the machine, with her hallucinations having convinced her that Clarke would die. In Arkadia, Jaha overhears Niylah use a phrase associated with the cult who built the shelter, and believes that the shelter he found was a decoy. Suspecting Gaia may have information that could lead to the real shelter, he, Kane and Monty go to Polis, where the Tree People are fighting the Ice Nation for control. Gaia helps them deduce that the shelter is beneath Polis, and they find it using a talisman found at the decoy shelter.
54	9	"DNR"	Mairzee Almas	Miranda Kwok	April 26, 2017	T27.13260	0.81
Clarke struggles to keep the peace in Polis after word of Jaha's discovery of the shelter spreads, which makes other clans, including Roan's and Indra's, want a part of the shelter for their own people. To secure the peace, Clarke agrees to become the new Commander, but the revelation of where her Nightblood comes from causes Roan to decide to hold a final conclave instead to determine which clan will control the bunker. At Arkadia, Jasper and Bellamy get into an argument when Jasper and other like-minded youth of the original 100 want to stay behind to celebrate the end of the world, while Bellamy wants to lead the remainder of Arkadia's 400-plus population to the shelter before the death wave arrives in less than six days and wipes out all life. Raven decides to stay behind at the lab as she is haunted by Becca's hallucination urging her to continue the space rocket repairs as Murphy and Emori decide to head out to the shelter. Elsewhere, Octavia struggles to adjust to living at Ilian's farm until a brutal and lethal encounter with three hostile grounders make her realize that she cannot run away from her past.
55	10	"Die All, Die Merrily"	Dean White	Aaron Ginsburg & Wade McIntyre	May 3, 2017	T27.13259	0.85
The clans hold a fight to the death at Polis to determine which clan will receive the shelter. Octavia, Roan, and Ilian represent their respective clans. Luna also fights, but explains she will not let anyone into the shelter if she wins. During the fight, Echo is discovered to be cheating without Roan's knowledge and is subsequently banished by Roan as punishment. Octavia decides to ally with Ilian, but he is killed with an arrow to his neck by Echo. Later, only three warriors are left; Octavia teams up with Roan to take on Luna, but a storm of black rain arrives which puts both of them at a disadvantage against Luna, who is a Nightblood. Although Luna kills Roan, Octavia eventually defeats Luna and becomes the winning champion. She decides to share the shelter equally with the clans, allowing 100 survivors from each clan. It is then discovered that members of Skaikru settled in the bunker during the battle and sealed the door.
56	11	"The Other Side"	Henry Ian Cusick	Julie Benson & Shawna Benson	May 10, 2017	T27.13261	0.86
With little sense of the situation outside of the bunker, Clarke and Jaha refuse to open the door and risk the future of humanity. Abby helps Bellamy unlock the door and Clarke is unable to use force to stop him from opening it. Echo is stopped from exposing Skaikru's treachery when Octavia threatens to reveal her cheating and banishment. Octavia bans Echo from the bunker. By Octavia's decision, Clarke is left with 12 hours to banish over 300 of her people to the surface, possibly leaving too few skilled workers to maintain the bunker. At Arkadia, Monty tries to save the others to no avail. The partygoers commit mass suicide using a fatal overdose of the hallucinogenic Jobi Nuts previously encountered by the 100 shortly after their landing on Earth, Jasper dying in a devastated Monty's arms. However, Harper decides that she loves Monty enough to live. At the same time, a rapidly-deteriorating Raven is convinced to undergo a suicidal spacewalk by her hallucination of Becca before a hallucination of Sinclair appears to give her new hope. With Sinclair's help, Raven purges A.L.I.E.'s residual code from her brain by temporarily killing herself, "rebooting" her brain and curing her condition.
57	12	"The Chosen"	Alex Kalymnios	Aaron Ginsburg & Wade McIntyre	May 17, 2017	T27.13262	0.83
Jaha and Kane disagree over how to handle their grim reality when they must choose only 100 out of their 400 people to shelter at the Second Dawn bunker to make room for the rest of the 1,200 grounders, who want to place their own survivors there as well. It all leads to holding a lottery which threatens to tear the fragile plans apart. Abby asks Kane to let her give up her place to make space for others. Eventually, the two men gas their people and use Clarke's list to decide who will stay. Clarke leads Bellamy, Murphy, and Emori to save Raven, who still is at the lab with Murphy and Emori planning to shelter in the lighthouse bunker Murphy was trapped in. A group of grounders attacks them, but Echo saves them; Clarke gives Emori her suit after Emori's is damaged, but Clarke suffers from the radiation, suggesting that her Nightblood failed. With no time to return to Polis, Monty and Harper are called to transport the group to the lab where they come up with a plan to go to the remnants of the Ark in space to survive instead.
58	13	"Praimfaya"	Dean White	Jason Rothenberg	May 24, 2017	T27.13263	0.91
As the death wave hits Polis and the Second Dawn bunker, Clarke, Bellamy, Raven, Murphy, Emori, Monty, Harper and Echo gather at the lab to ready the rocket to travel to the remains of the Ark. Monty is incapacitated after going out with Murphy to obtain an oxygen generator for installation in the Ark from the lighthouse bunker. With only 25 minutes before the death wave hits, Clarke uses a satellite tower to power up the Ark remotely, but complications force her to miss the rocket launch. Clarke ultimately succeeds and runs back to the lab with the death wave right behind her, but upon arriving she is revealed to have been affected by the radiation. On the Ark, the group almost runs out of air before the oxygen generator is installed. The death wave destroys the Earth, scorching most of the planet bare. Six years and seven days later, Clarke is revealed to have survived the death wave due to her Nightblood along with a young Nightblood girl, Madi. While Clarke tries to make contact with the Ark, a spacecraft lands on Earth in the only fertile valley left. The sign on the side of the ship identifies it as a prison transport, alarming Clarke.

=== Season 5 (2018) ===
No. overall	No. in season	Title	Directed by	Written by	Original release date	Prod. code	U.S. viewers (millions)
59	1	"Eden"	Dean White	Jason Rothenberg	April 24, 2018	T27.13551	1.43
In a flashback to six weeks after Praimfaya, Clarke searches for food and water in the rover, first going to Polis where she tries to dig out the bunker, then to Arkadia where she finds Maya's MP3 player among other people's possessions as well as Jasper's goggles and a suicide letter addressed to Monty. She then drives to the Dead Zone, where the rover breaks down in a storm. She follows a bird, at one stage considering suicide, and discovers the Shallow Valley. She finds a room of dead people, then a young Nightblood girl who runs from her. Clarke follows her and tries to get acquainted with her, which does not work until Clarke draws a sketch of her. The time jumps back to six years after Praimfaya, where Clarke and the Nightblood, Madi, are living together. Raven and the other six on the Go-Sci Ring try to boost signals to contact the Bunker, when they see the Eligius ship. Clarke watches the passengers debark the ship, where they roam the area and almost kill Madi, before Clarke jumps in. Echo tells Bellamy she is afraid of returning to the ground. Octavia watches over Wonkru warriors fighting to the death.
60	2	"Red Queen"	P. J. Pesce	Terri Hughes Burton	May 1, 2018	T27.13552	1.02
Shortly after Praimfaya, the clan delegates discuss punishment for a thief. Kane and Abby hear Clarke knocking on the bunker, and when they try to open it, they discover it has been sealed shut due to the rubble from Polis. A Skaikru rebel stages a coup and locks several Skaikru members in the farm area. While grounders gather the remaining Skaikru not in the farm area, Jaha is stabbed. Octavia spares him due to his expertise as an engineer. With Jaha, Indra, and Gaia's help, Octavia resolves the problem of opening the farm area door and proves herself to be a capable leader. When many grounders question her leadership, she kills them, telling them they are Wonkru, or they are against Wonkru. Those remaining bow before her. After opening the door, Octavia, Kane, and Abby rush to Jaha's aid. As Kane recites the Skaikru prayer, Jaha dies of his injuries. As punishment for Kara and the guilty Skaikru involved in the coup, Octavia instructs them to fight to the death. Kara emerges victorious. Six years later, Octavia and her advisers watch over Wonkru warriors fighting to the death. The next batch of combatants are brought in, Kane among them.
61	3	"Sleeping Giants"	Tim Scanlan	Aaron Ginsburg & Wade McIntyre	May 8, 2018	T27.13553	1.08
Clarke and Madi hide from the Eligius crew, while Diyoza sends McCreary to find them and interrogate them. He captures Clarke and brings her to Diyoza. To make Clarke talk, she orders Madi shot on sight. Clarke promises to tell her everything. Raven and the others board the Eligius IV ship in space and find a way to Earth. Monty and Murphy argue over returning to Earth, when Echo finds a lab of cryogenically frozen prisoners. One prisoner is remotely woken up by the prisoners on the ground and attacks Bellamy, who kills him. In order to leverage the frozen prisoners against Diyoza, Raven stays behind. Bellamy objects until Raven tells him of an escape pod that she can use to go to Earth. Bellamy, Echo, Monty, Harper and Emori safely make their way back to the ground. Murphy stays behind with Raven and learns that there is no escape pod and they are trapped. The Eligius men find Bellamy and the others. Shortly after, Madi kills the Eligius men and guides them to Clarke. McCreary uses a shock collar on Clarke. Bellamy arrives, telling Diyoza that 283 frozen people will be killed if they do not release Clarke.
62	4	"Pandora's Box"	Dean White	Charmaine DeGrate	May 15, 2018	T27.13554	1.07
Octavia punishes Kane for stealing medicine, which is a crime against Wonkru. Bellamy and Clarke reunite after he brokers a deal with Diyoza. Diyoza outwardly accepts the deal but still tries to hack into the Eligius mainframe. Bellamy and Clarke, with the help of Diyoza and McCreary, break into the bunker and rescue everyone inside. Octavia is the first to be lifted onto the ground. Miles opens the docking bay doors to Eligius 4 in an attempt to kill Raven and Murphy, but they counter by waking up the frozen prisoners. The Eligius warriors on the ground break the deal and take Kane and Abby. As they attempt to fire missiles at Wonkru, they find that the launch codes have been changed. Miles tells them it must be Raven. They fly to retrieve Raven while Octavia tells Wonkru to prepare for war.
63	5	"Shifting Sands"	Omar Madha	Nick Bragg	May 22, 2018	T27.13555	0.94
Diyoza orders Kane and Abby to help and cure Vinson, while Octavia takes her people to march on the Shallow Valley. McCreary tortures Raven and threatens to kill Murphy to find out how to turn their weapons system back on. Miles stops him with a gun to his head and reveals to Raven and Murphy that he was the one who disabled the system. Abby tells Diyoza she does not know if she can help Vinson. Murphy escapes with Miles' help and Echo finds him. She, Murphy, Harper, Emori, Monty and Madi set out to find Bellamy, but McCreary activates Murphy's shock collar, leaving him with Emori while the rest keep on the journey. A Wonkru warrior dies and worms pop out of his chest. Octavia and Wonkru retreat, as the four in the van arrive. Octavia angrily witnesses Bellamy and Echo's reunion, as do a reconciling Madi and Clarke.
64	6	"Exit Wounds"	Michael Blundell	Drew Lindo	June 5, 2018	T27.13556	0.92
Octavia confronts Bellamy over his relationship with Echo and reiterates the latter's banishment. Diyoza's ship arrives, delivering apples and offering free passage to any Wonkru defectors. Octavia offers Echo a deal to spy on her people and report anyone that plans to defect in exchange for her banishment to be lifted. Echo decides against Octavia's plan, offering instead to go undercover as a defector so that she can hack into Diyoza's camp, with Monty's help. Octavia agrees, but has Cooper shoot fleeing defectors, ostensibly for appearances. Monty eventually deduces that he will need to access the firewall for Diyoza's camp from the inside. Murphy and Emori work to remove his shock collar and decide to use his collar to set up an explosive trap, during which time they discuss and rekindle their relationship. The two find that McCreary survived the explosion and take him hostage. Clarke, believing that Octavia will figure out and kill Madi for her natural Nightblood status, plans to leave with the defectors. Madi objects, fearing for Clarke's safety, and reveals her status to Octavia. Octavia tells Clarke that nothing bad will happen to Madi and that Madi will train as a Wonkru warrior. Echo successfully infiltrates Diyoza's camp.
65	7	"Acceptable Losses"	Mairzee Almas	Jeff Vlaming	June 19, 2018	T27.13557	0.83
Kane finds Abby huddled on the floor by a dead patient and deduces she was high on pills during the surgery despite her denials. Later, Kane gives Abby an ultimatum; him or the pills. Diyoza interviews the Wonkru defectors to determine their use and trustworthiness. In order to gain Diyoza's trust, Echo reports Shaw as the one to shut down the systems despite Raven's protesting which distracts Diyoza, allowing Echo to install Monty's backdoor into the prisoner's system. A bloodied, collared Shaw later appears in the defector's room. In the bunker, Clarke and Bellamy discover Cooper's human experimentation to breed the parasitic worms as a weapon. Octavia reveals her plan to release the worms with the next group of Defectors. Diyoza reveals her pregnancy to Abby. Madi, at the urging of Clarke and Gaia, initially hides her aptitude in hand-to-hand combat, but drops the charade during a class presentation to Octavia and is designated Octavia's second. Clarke attempts to negotiate a nonviolent settlement of the valley with Diyoza. The only term Diyoza will agree to is Wonkru's unconditional surrender, to which Octavia will never agree. Clarke declares the need to assassinate Octavia.
66	8	"How We Get to Peace"	Antonio Negret	Lauren Muir	June 26, 2018	T27.13558	0.73
Octavia is ready to prepare for an all-out war against Diyoza which Clarke opposes. Despite perfecting the algae, Monty's request to end the war and forget about the valley is ignored. Monty, sick of the unending violence, resolves to not go with his friends to the valley. Due to Octavia's unwillingness to listen to reason, Clarke and Bellamy decide to sabotage Wonkru's plan to attack the valley. Clarke and Bellamy enlist the help of Indra to sabotage Octavia's plan. They use the worms to kill Cooper, and attempt to make her death look like an accident. At the camp, Diyoza reveals to Kane that she is pregnant while the two discuss their plans for a better world. Raven finds out about Abby's addiction to pills, and feels betrayed when Abby tricks her into creating a device that can cure the lung disease of the Eligius prisoners. Later, Octavia finds Cooper's body, and immediately deduces Cooper was murdered and she reveals to Indra that she had planned to use the worm's eggs on the camp instead of the worms. Octavia arrests Clarke for treason and plans to have her executed. Bellamy and Octavia have dinner where Bellamy uses Monty's algae to poison her food.
67	9	"Sic Semper Tyrannis"	Ian Samoil	Miranda Kwok	July 10, 2018	T27.13559	0.89
Indra announces her intentions to surrender to Diyoza to Wonkru, only to be challenged by Miller for leadership. Wonkru takes Miller's side and Indra tells Bellamy that Madi ascending is the only way that they can stop the war. Clarke opposes the plan but Bellamy leaves her chained up to carry it out. In Eden, Murphy successfully starts a civil war by telling McCreary that Diyoza has a cure for the lung disease. A battle breaks out, and McCreary takes over the valley with Diyoza escaping. Raven, Emori, Echo, and Shaw escape while Kane and Murphy stay behind to find Abby and Diyoza. Octavia wakes up and reports Bellamy's betrayal, but Indra secures the room and will not let her leave. Niylah eventually rescues Clarke who goes to kill Octavia. Octavia convinces her that neither of them want Madi to ascend. However, Gaia performs the ascension on Madi; Clarke then shows up and escapes with Madi in the rover. Octavia arrests Bellamy, Indra, and Gaia and sentences them to fight in the arena. Then, behind closed doors, Octavia sheds a tear.
68	10	"The Warriors Will"	Henry Ian Cusick	Julie Benson & Shawna Benson	July 17, 2018	T27.13560	0.86
Clarke goes on the run with Madi and tells her she will remove the flame, but Madi insists that she needs to go back, because the flame is giving her visions of the previous commanders, including Becca Pramheda. Octavia remembers her childhood with Bellamy, noting how Bellamy always protected her. They talk about him poisoning her and he states that this was to protect her too. Octavia tells Bellamy of a weakness of Indra's because she still doesn't want him to die. Monty shows Octavia that the Hydrofarm is working again and they could grow crops elsewhere. However, despite this she still makes Indra, Bellamy, and Gaia fight. McCreary takes Abby's pills away in order to make her cure him, so Abby enlists Vinson to get them back for her under the pretense of two hour check-ups. When Vinson comes with the pills, he attacks the guards and Abby takes the pills. Clarke and Madi find Diyoza's men killing defectors in the woods and convince one to tell them where Abby is, where they find her unconscious. Monty stops the fight between Bellamy, Gaia, and Indra by revealing the truth about the Hydrofarm to Wonkru, as well as Octavia's knowledge of it. They turn against her, so she burns the Hydrofarm down, leaving everybody with one choice, stay behind and die or march with her and live.
69	11	"The Dark Year"	Alex Kalymnios	Heidi Cole McAdams	July 24, 2018	T27.13561	0.85
Clarke helps Abby after her overdose and McCreary orders her to get her mother operating again, and says that if she still refuses to cure them, they can both watch their daughters die. Raven, Emori, Murphy and Echo head out to scout ways into the valley (Octavia's army will arrive in 5 days). Raven tells Shaw to stay behind. Shaw follows the scouting group, and after Murphy suggests they steal the ammo rather than just scouting, they get ambushed, and Shaw saves them. The truth of the dark year in the bunker is revealed - they do not have enough protein until another year, so they have to get it from the fighting pits. Clarke and Abby cure McCreary's people and Madi confronts Clarke, telling her they are on the wrong side of the war. Bellamy tells Octavia about the safe way into the valley, as long as she agrees to his terms - accept McCreary's surrender and share the valley - to which Octavia agrees. Diyoza and Kane go to McCreary and tell him that Wonkru will win because they know every move he is going to make before he makes it but they will tell him how to win the war.
70	12	"Damocles – Part One"	Dean White	Justine Juel Gillmer	July 31, 2018	T27.13562	0.88
McCreary's men ambush Wonkru at the gorge, causing many fatalities and trapping Bellamy, Octavia, Indra, and Gaia. Madi hears the attack over the radio and tries to help, but Clarke forcibly detains her. The surviving Wonkru retreat to the wasteland and descend into disarray. Echo, Raven, and Shaw go into McCreary's camp to recover Madi so she can lead Wonkru, however Clarke betrays them to McCreary. Vinson attacks Kane and grievously injures him, however Vinson is slain by Abby. Recalling Lexa's memories from the Flame, Madi sways Clarke to her side. Clarke kills McCreary's guards and stays to prevent the launch of the transport ship while Madi and Echo return to Wonkru. Back at the gorge Octavia decides to draw the fire of McCreary's men so that Bellamy and Indra can flee with Gaia, but before she gets gunned down they're saved by the Rover carrying Bellamy's group and Madi.
71	13	"Damocles – Part Two"	Dean White	Jason Rothenberg	August 7, 2018	T27.13563	0.99
Bellamy's group along with Madi, Octavia, Gaia, and Indra return to Wonkru. Octavia publicly submits to Madi, unifying Wonkru under Madi's command. Clarke frees Diyoza and holds her and McCreary's unborn child hostage, grounding the transport ship. Bellamy's group freely enter the gorge and take out its defenses, clearing the way for Wonkru. McCreary triggers a protocol that will destroy the valley before he's killed by Clarke. Octavia helps Abby get Kane to safety. Everyone on Earth flees the planet and head towards the Eligius mothership before the valley is destroyed. Everyone decides to enter cryogenic sleep for 10 years in order to give Earth time to recuperate. Clarke and Bellamy awaken first and are greeted by Jordan, the son of the now-deceased Monty and Harper, who had elected to not undergo cryostasis. They're informed by Jordan that 125 years have passed and through a series of video diaries left by Monty and Harper they learn that Earth never fully recovered. However, Monty managed to hack the Eligius Three mission file, leading to the discovery of another planet on a distant binary star system where he sends the survivors prior to his death.

=== Season 6 (2019) ===
No. overall	No. in season	Title	Directed by	Written by	Original release date	Prod. code	U.S. viewers (millions)
72	1	"Sanctum"	Ed Fraiman	Jason Rothenberg	April 30, 2019	T27.13801	0.86
Clarke, Bellamy, Echo, Emori, Murphy, Miller, Jackson, and Shaw go down to explore the moon Alpha and determine its survivability. While the group is chased by a swarm of native bugs, Shaw runs into a shield of radiation and dies. The others make it to a seemingly abandoned compound. After Bellamy confronts Clarke over the radio calls, he discovers a children's book depicting the moon's binary solar eclipse causing people to go insane. Just then, Emori stabs Murphy and tries to kill him, having been influenced by the airborne toxins. In space, Abby performs surgery on Kane to save him. She instructs Niylah to get blood from all sleeping Skaikru. Octavia, being woken up with her people, confronts an awoken Kane about his betrayal of Wonkru. Their argument leads to Kane suffering internal bleeding and Abby puts him back into cryo until she can figure out how to save him.
73	2	"Red Sun Rising"	Alex Kalymnios	Jeff Vlaming	May 7, 2019	T27.13802	0.81
In a flashback 236 years ago, humans from Earth found Sanctum on the moon Alpha. A binary solar eclipse occurs, causing the lead scientist to go on a murderous rampage. In the present, the toxins continue to affect Clarke, Bellamy, Echo, Emori, Murphy, Miller, and Jackson. They attempt to chain themselves up to avoid hurting each other, but Clarke, Bellamy, and Murphy end up free. Bellamy ends up trying to kill Clarke and Murphy, but Clarke subdues all three of them with a sleeping gas. A group of the planet's inhabitants steals the group's ship and take control of the mothership. Stuck in the cafeteria, many Wonkru violently attack Octavia for her past actions. Raven wakes Diyoza and they team up with Madi to retake control of the bridge. Afterward, Abby, Diyoza, Raven, Madi, Jordan, Gaia, their prisoner, and a stowaway Octavia arrive on the planet and go to the compound where Raven discovers Shaw is dead. A group of children run up to the crew and think they've come to take them all back home.
74	3	"The Children of Gabriel"	Dean White	Drew Lindo	May 14, 2019	T27.13803	0.82
When Sanctum residents return after the eclipse, Clarke requests the Earth group be allowed to stay in Sanctum. Their leader, Russell, asks Raven to bring the transport ship inside Sanctum's radiation shield for safety, while he and Clarke discuss the future of the Earth group over dinner. Jordan falls for Delilah, a Sanctum girl who is preparing for her "Naming Day" to become a Prime. He tells her about Clarke's history as Wanheda and how she killed people to protect her own. This causes Russell to deny Clarke's request to stay in Sanctum. At the dropship, Madi, Diyoza and Gaia are ambushed by a group known as the "Children of Gabriel" who steal their weapons and behead Kaylee's dead family bodies as they chant "Death to Primes!" As Raven's group approaches, Octavia goes in and kills the Children of Gabriel. Following this, Bellamy exiles Octavia from the ship and leaves her to die alone. Back in Sanctum, Delilah and Rose are kidnapped by the Children of Gabriel. When Clarke saves Delilah, Russell changes his mind, letting the Earth group stay in Sanctum. However, he kicks Diyoza out after recognizing her as a terrorist.
75	4	"The Face Behind the Glass"	Tim Scanlan	Charmaine DeGraté	May 21, 2019	T27.13804	0.73
In the woods, Diyoza is approached by Jade, a Sanctum guard who offers to let Diyoza's child be raised in Sanctum if she saves Rose from the Children of Gabriel. The Children of Gabriel are torturing Octavia for information about any hosts (Nightbloods) they have from Earth. Tosh suggests killing Octavia and Rose but Xavier wants to take them to their "Old Man." While the CoG are arguing, Octavia escapes with Rose. The CoG run after them but Diyoza arrives just in time to kill a few and rescue them. However, Tosh ultimately kills Rose. Octavia and Diyoza team up to hunt the remaining Children of Gabriel and their leader, the Old Man. In Sanctum, it's Delilah's Naming Day and part of the ceremony involves making amends. Clarke embraces it but Raven refuses to accept her apology. After the ritual, Delilah comes back as Priya VII and doesn't recognize Jordan. Cillian turns out to be a spy for the Children of Gabriel. He paralyzes Clarke before getting caught in the act and deciding to slit his own throat rather than surrendering to interrogation. Since Clarke is a Nightblood, Russell and Simone take advantage of her paralyzed state to use her as a host for their daughter, Josephine, rather than have to wait a further 56 years for another host to mature at the cost of wiping Clarke's own mind, apparently killing her. After Clarke is mind-wiped, the Lightbournes insert Josephine's mind drive into her head, resurrecting Josephine in Clarke's body.
76	5	"The Gospel of Josephine"	Ian Samoil	Georgia Lee	May 28, 2019	T27.13805	0.73
After waking up, Josephine kills Kaylee as revenge for killing her last host. She is then forced by her parents to pretend to be Clarke to find out how many other Nightbloods the Earth group has. Jordan suspects something happened to Delilah because she's not herself. He, Bellamy, Murphy, and Gaia find a secret room where they discover that the Primes have been using mind drives to take on new Nightblood host bodies, and essentially live forever, but at the cost of mind-wiping their new hosts, effectively killing them. Having followed them, Josephine defends the Primes, to Bellamy and Gaia's surprise. After learning that Abby knows how to turn ordinary people into Nightbloods, Josephine goes to report but a suspicious Bellamy confronts her. Josephine admits that she's not Clarke before knocking Bellamy out. She decides to use Murphy to get more information by offering him immortality. In the woods, Octavia and Diyoza are chasing after Xavier when they get stuck in a swampy-surface called the crucible. Octavia struggles to get out against Xavier's advice, which causes her to sink faster. When a temporal flare approaches, Xavier throws them a rope to escape but it's too late for Octavia. Diyoza runs from the area and Octavia submerges herself under the crucible surface, not knowing one of her hands is still exposed. Diyoza comes back later to dig Octavia out.
77	6	"Memento Mori"	P.J. Pesce	Alyssa Clark	June 11, 2019	T27.13806	0.64
Murphy teaches Josephine how to act like Clarke. Josephine tricks Abby into resuming the Nightblood program by convincing her to save Kane by turning him into a Nightblood in order to resurrect him in another body. She asks Simone to erase Kaylee's family's mind drives and give some to Murphy and Abby for their cooperation. When Madi starts seeing Sheidheda, the Dark Commander, Gaia performs the Separation Ritual for other Commanders to stop him but it doesn't work. After learning about the Primes, Raven confronts Ryker about it. Octavia's hand begins to age rapidly and it spreads up her arm. Xavier says if it reaches her brain, she'll die. Echo goes on a wild goose chase to search for Bellamy, who is actually locked up. Murphy tries to convince Bellamy not to get revenge on Sanctum for Clarke's death. Bellamy refuses at first but eventually caves in. As they mourn Clarke's death, Sheidheda asks Madi to kill Gaia and get revenge by killing them all but Madi banishes Gaia instead. Outside Sanctum, Xavier helps Diyoza find a cure for Octavia's hand but it doesn't work. When Octavia's hand starts drawing a spiral, Xavier realizes that the temporal flare was a message from the anomaly. He teams up with Diyoza and Octavia to go to the anomaly. After Josephine goes to sleep, Clarke is revealed to still be alive, trapped inside of her own head.
78	7	"Nevermind"	Michael Blundell	Kim Shumway	June 18, 2019	T27.13807	0.72
Trapped inside of her own mind, Clarke learns that she survived thanks to having a piece of A.L.I.E. inside of her from when Clarke entered the City of Light. A.L.I.E. helps Clarke protect the memory of Clarke using an EMP to free Raven from the AI's control as the Primes can use it to get rid of Clarke for good. Searching through her mindscape to try and find a way to stop Josephine, Clarke is confronted by manifestations of her father, Octavia as Bloodreina, and Maya, until Josephine manages to talk Clarke into surrendering by suggesting that this would be the final sacrifice necessary to save her people. However, as Clarke prepares for death, she is confronted by a manifestation of Monty, who convinces Clarke to examine Josephine's memories, revealing that Josephine encouraged a twisted form of eugenics where anyone not capable of producing Nightblood offspring would be killed, preaching that only the Primes deserved to live. Although inspired to continue opposing Josephine, Clarke fails to regain control of her body and enrages Josephine in the process. At the same time, Bellamy and Miller use Clarke's murder to negotiate a deal with Russell. During the meeting, Clarke is able to seize control of one finger and use it to discreetly send a Morse code message to Bellamy that she is still alive. Quickly grasping the implications, Bellamy tells Miller that they will get Clarke back. Josephine warns her parents that Clarke is still alive but knows how to get rid of Clarke for good.
79	8	"The Old Man and the Anomaly"	April Mullen	Miranda Kwok	June 25, 2019	T27.13808	0.63
With Raven's help, Abby replicates Nightblood and resurrects Kane in Gavin's body. On their way to the anomaly, Diyoza realizes that Xavier is actually the mythical Gabriel Santiago himself who explains that one of his followers resurrected him in the real Xavier's body against his will after his last host died. Gabriel leads the two women to the anomaly where a hallucination of her daughter draws Diyoza into the anomaly, leaving her fate unknown. When Octavia follows, she emerges healed. At the same time, Josephine plots to get rid of Clarke with the help of Ryker, Emori and Murphy against Russell's will as Russell wishes to restore Clarke and get Josephine a willing new host. Clarke's friends plot to get her back, but Madi falls under the influence of the Dark Commander, murders Miranda and seriously wounds Jordan. Emori betrays Murphy and Josephine to help save Clarke before her body burns out from the strain. Josephine seriously wounds Murphy in a failed attempt to escape and Bellamy departs on his own to enlist the Children of Gabriel's help in removing her from Clarke. Enraged at the deaths of so many Primes and the kidnapping of his daughter, Russell orders his people to use whatever means necessary to find Josephine.
80	9	"What You Take With You"	Marshall Virtue	Nikki Goldwaser	July 9, 2019	T27.13809	0.70
Believing that Octavia was in the anomaly for a longer period of time than it seemed, Gabriel uses Red Sun toxin to try to help Octavia regain her memories. Octavia hallucinates herself in the bunker arena where Charles Pike confronts Octavia over her actions. Pike helps Octavia see that she wants redemption for her actions and Octavia symbolically kills her dark side in the form of Blodreina. At the same time, Kane struggles to adjust to his new body and the morality issues that come with it, particularly after meeting the wife of his host, Gavin. Josephine and Bellamy are captured by the Children of Gabriel while the wall between Josephine and Clarke's minds continues to disintegrate. After awakening Indra, Kane decides to commit suicide by having Indra float him and the Nightblood serum after a tearful goodbye with Abby. With her life in danger, Josephine relinquishes control to Clarke who flees, leaving Bellamy with the keys to his chains in order to make his own escape. Now seeing Josephine in the waking world, Clarke chooses to seek out Gabriel who gets her message alongside Octavia who is now dedicated to saving her friends.
81	10	"Matryoshka"	Amanda Tapping	Drew Lindo	July 16, 2019	T27.13810	0.57
With the help of a reluctant Ryker, Echo and Gaia foment a rebellion against the Primes, leading to a man assassinating Simone. In response, Russell prepares to burn everyone at the stake, but is convinced that Abby can help him create new Nightbloods through bone marrow transplants in order to resurrect all of the Primes. With Madi falling further under the Dark Commander's influence, Raven plots to erase his mind for good with the help of Gaia. As Clarke's body continues to deteriorate, she and Josephine are forced to work together in order to survive. After reuniting with Gabriel and Octavia, they are rescued from Sanctum guards by Bellamy who sends a threat back with Jade that Russell will never see Josephine again if he harms their people. Gabriel removes Josephine's mind drive, but her consciousness is able to hang on inside of Clarke's body and attempts to kill Clarke. With Bellamy urging her to fight, Clarke kills Josephine in their shared mindspace, destroying her consciousness for good and Clarke is reunited with Bellamy and Octavia.
82	11	"Ashes to Ashes"	Bob Morley	Charmaine DeGraté	July 23, 2019	T27.13811	0.54
Using Madi's bone marrow, Ryker makes Echo into a Nightblood to become the next host for Simone. Echo tries to convince Ryker to let her go, recognizing that he is conflicted. Echo shares her backstory with Ryker, revealing that she is actually Echo's best friend Ash who was forced to kill the real Echo as a child and take her place. Gaia and Miller manage to escape and rescue Echo before she can be mind-wiped. Echo then kills Ryker. At the same time, Clarke and the others are captured by the Children of Gabriel and work to come up with a plan to defeat the Primes once and for all. They come up with a way to simulate a Red Sun eclipse in order to cause an evacuation of Sanctum. After Jade arrives with Murphy, Clarke poses as Josephine in order to infiltrate Sanctum and take down the radiation shield. Clarke is able to fool both Russell and Madi, but Madi's anger at Clarke's supposed death causes her to fall fully under the influence of the Dark Commander and agree to his plans.
83	12	"Adjustment Protocol"	Antonio Negret	Kim Shumway	July 30, 2019	T27.13812	0.61
The Dark Commander, now in full control of Madi, threatens to kill her if he is deleted from the Flame; without Becca's notebook, Raven is unable to hack the Flame and delete him. To protect Madi, Abby becomes a Nightblood to give the last doses of bone marrow to Russell. After reconciling with Raven, Abby is mind-wiped by Russell and made into the new host for a resurrected Simone. With Russell preparing to resurrect all of the Primes, Gabriel goes rogue to stop him, but can't bring himself to kill Russell and is captured. Continuing her guise as Josephine, Clarke forces Priya to help her knock out power to Sanctum and reveal the truth about the Primes to the citizens. In retaliation, Russell unleashes a massive amount of Red Sun toxin, causing the citizens to go mad and attack each other with Priya being killed by Delilah's mother in the chaos. The reunited Primes decide to retreat to Eligius IV for the time being, using Raven, Madi and Gaia as hostages while Murphy and Emori choose to remain behind to save their friends.
84	13	"The Blood of Sanctum"	Ed Fraiman	Jason Rothenberg	August 6, 2019	T27.13813	0.59
Murphy and Emori, posing as Daniel and Kaylee Prime, manage to rescue their friends from zealots. Working together, the group overpowers the Sanctum citizens under the control of the toxin, saving many although an unknown number kill each other in the conflict. After taking over Eligius IV, Clarke is forced to reveal herself to stop the Primes from mind-wiping Wonkru. Clarke floats all of the Primes but Russell into space, enraging Russell who teams up with the Dark Commander to get revenge. Urged by Clarke, Madi regains control and arrests Russell, now the last surviving Prime. With Madi's life at risk, Raven deletes the Flame, but discovers that the Dark Commander was able to upload himself to an unknown location. In the aftermath, everyone is left wondering if they did the right thing while symbols connected to the anomaly are discovered on Octavia's back. Using the symbols causes the anomaly to expand and Diyoza's adult daughter Hope to emerge. Hope states that "he" has her mother and stabs Octavia before collapsing. Octavia vanishes as the anomaly returns to normal, leaving her fate unknown.

=== Season 7 (2020) ===
No. overall	No. in season	Title	Directed by	Written by	Original release date	Prod. code	U.S. viewers (millions)
85	1	"From the Ashes"	Ed Fraiman	Jason Rothenberg	May 20, 2020	T27.14051	0.80
86	2	"The Garden"	Dean White	Jeff Vlaming	May 27, 2020	T27.14053	0.76
87	3	"False Gods"	Tim Scanlan	Kim Shumway	June 3, 2020	T27.14052	0.71
88	4	"Hesperides"	Diana Valentine	Sean Crouch	June 10, 2020	T27.14054	0.63
89	5	"Welcome to Bardo"	Ian Samoil	Drew Lindo	June 17, 2020	T27.14055	0.68
90	6	"Nakara"	PJ Pesce	Erica Meredith	June 24, 2020	T27.14056	0.57
91	7	"The Queen's Gambit"	Lindsey Morgan	Miranda Kwok	July 1, 2020	T27.14057	0.64
92	8	"Anaconda"	Ed Fraiman	Jason Rothenberg	July 8, 2020	T27.14063	0.67
93	9	"The Flock"	Amyn Kaderali	Alyssa Clark	July 15, 2020	T27.14058	0.61
94	10	"A Little Sacrifice"	Sherwin Shilati	Nikki Goldwaser	August 5, 2020	T27.14059	0.47
95	11	"Etherea"	Aprill Winney	Jeff Vlaming	August 12, 2020	T27.14060	0.58
96	12	"The Stranger"	Amanda Row	Blythe Ann Johnson	August 19, 2020	T27.14062	0.54
97	13	"Blood Giant"	Michael Cliett	Ross Knight	September 9, 2020	T27.14061	0.59
98	14	"A Sort of Homecoming"	Jessica Harmon	Sean Crouch	September 16, 2020	T27.14065	0.63
99	15	"The Dying of the Light"	Ian Samoil	Kim Shumway	September 23, 2020	T27.14064	0.52
100	16	"The Last War"	Jason Rothenberg	Jason Rothenberg	September 30, 2020	T27.14066	0.61

== Ratings ==
=== Season 1 ===
Viewership and ratings per episode of List of The 100 episodes
No.	Title	Air date	Rating/share (18–49)	Viewers (millions)	DVR (18–49)	Total (18–49)
1	"Pilot"	March 19, 2014	0.9/3	2.73	—N/a	—N/a
2	"Earth Skills"	March 26, 2014	0.7/2	2.27	0.5	1.2
3	"Earth Kills"	April 2, 2014	0.6/2	1.90	0.4	1.0
4	"Murphy's Law"	April 9, 2014	0.5/2	1.69	0.4	0.9
5	"Twilight's Last Gleaming"	April 16, 2014	0.5/2	1.80	—N/a	—N/a
6	"His Sister's Keeper"	April 23, 2014	0.6/2	1.97	0.4	1.0
7	"Contents Under Pressure"	April 30, 2014	0.6/2	1.88	—N/a	—N/a
8	"Day Trip"	May 7, 2014	0.6/2	1.64	—N/a	—N/a
9	"Unity Day"	May 14, 2014	0.6/2	1.73	0.3	0.9
10	"I Am Become Death"	May 21, 2014	0.5/1	1.46	—N/a	—N/a
11	"The Calm"	May 28, 2014	0.6/2	1.71	—N/a	—N/a
12	"We Are Grounders – Part I"	June 4, 2014	0.6/2	1.58	—N/a	—N/a
13	"We Are Grounders – Part II"	June 11, 2014	0.5/2	1.68	—N/a	—N/a

=== Season 2 ===
Viewership and ratings per episode of List of The 100 episodes
No.	Title	Air date	Rating/share (18–49)	Viewers (millions)	DVR (18–49)	Total (18–49)
1	"The 48"	October 22, 2014	0.5/1	1.54	0.3	0.8
2	"Inclement Weather"	October 29, 2014	0.5/2	1.48	—N/a	—N/a
3	"Reapercussions"	November 5, 2014	0.5/2	1.68	0.4	0.9
4	"Many Happy Returns"	November 12, 2014	0.5/2	1.75	0.4	0.9
5	"Human Trials"	November 19, 2014	0.6/2	1.64	—N/a	—N/a
6	"Fog of War"	December 3, 2014	0.6/2	1.86	0.4	1.0
7	"Long Into an Abyss"	December 10, 2014	0.6/2	1.62	0.4	1.0
8	"Spacewalker"	December 17, 2014	0.5/2	1.40	—N/a	—N/a
9	"Remember Me"	January 21, 2015	0.5/2	1.48	0.4	0.9
10	"Survival of the Fittest"	January 28, 2015	0.5/2	1.53	0.4	0.9
11	"Coup de Grace"	February 4, 2015	0.5/2	1.51	0.4	0.9
12	"Rubicon"	February 11, 2015	0.5/2	1.36	0.4	0.9
13	"Resurrection"	February 18, 2015	0.5/1	1.42	0.4	0.9
14	"Bodyguard of Lies"	February 25, 2015	0.5/1	1.55	0.3	0.8
15	"Blood Must Have Blood, Part One"	March 4, 2015	0.5/1	1.49	0.4	0.9
16	"Blood Must Have Blood, Part Two"	March 11, 2015	0.4/1	1.34	0.4	0.8

=== Season 3 ===
Viewership and ratings per episode of List of The 100 episodes
No.	Title	Air date	Rating/share (18–49)	Viewers (millions)	DVR (18–49)	DVR viewers (millions)	Total (18–49)	Total viewers (millions)
1	"Wanheda: Part One"	January 21, 2016	0.7/2	1.88	0.4	1.01	1.1	2.89
2	"Wanheda: Part Two"	January 28, 2016	0.6/2	1.63	0.4	0.9	1.0	2.54
3	"Ye Who Enter Here"	February 4, 2016	0.6/2	1.57	—N/a	0.92	—N/a	2.48
4	"Watch the Thrones"	February 11, 2016	0.5/2	1.32	—N/a	0.89	—N/a	2.21
5	"Hakeldama"	February 18, 2016	0.5/2	1.36	0.4	0.96	0.9	2.32
6	"Bitter Harvest"	February 25, 2016	0.6/2	1.41	—N/a	0.88	—N/a	2.29
7	"Thirteen"	March 3, 2016	0.5/2	1.39	—N/a	0.80	—N/a	2.19
8	"Terms and Conditions"	March 10, 2016	0.4/1	1.20	0.4	0.92	0.8	2.13
9	"Stealing Fire"	March 31, 2016	0.4/2	1.23	0.4	0.76	0.8	1.99
10	"Fallen"	April 7, 2016	0.4/1	1.13	0.4	0.79	0.8	1.98
11	"Nevermore"	April 14, 2016	0.4/1	1.08	0.3	0.75	0.7	1.83
12	"Demons"	April 21, 2016	0.4/1	1.15	0.3	0.74	0.7	1.89
13	"Join or Die"	April 28, 2016	0.4/1	1.27	0.4	0.75	0.8	2.02
14	"Red Sky at Morning"	May 5, 2016	0.4/2	1.13	0.3	0.75	0.7	1.88
15	"Perverse Instantiation – Part One"	May 12, 2016	0.4/1	1.17	0.3	0.72	0.7	1.89
16	"Perverse Instantiation – Part Two"	May 19, 2016	0.5/2	1.29	0.3	0.79	0.8	2.08

=== Season 4 ===
Viewership and ratings per episode of List of The 100 episodes
No.	Title	Air date	Rating/share (18–49)	Viewers (millions)	DVR (18–49)	DVR viewers (millions)	Total (18–49)	Total viewers (millions)
1	"Echoes"	February 1, 2017	0.4/2	1.21	0.3	0.75	0.7	1.97
2	"Heavy Lies the Crown"	February 8, 2017	0.4/1	1.01	0.3	0.78	0.7	1.79
3	"The Four Horsemen"	February 15, 2017	0.4/1	1.05	0.3	0.76	0.7	1.80
4	"A Lie Guarded"	February 22, 2017	0.4/1	1.00	0.3	0.70	0.7	1.69
5	"The Tinder Box"	March 1, 2017	0.4/1	1.02	—N/a	—N/a	—N/a	—N/a
6	"We Will Rise"	March 15, 2017	0.3/1	0.98	0.4	0.73	0.7	1.72
7	"Gimme Shelter"	March 22, 2017	0.3/1	0.90	0.3	0.74	0.6	1.63
8	"God Complex"	March 29, 2017	0.3/1	0.97	0.3	0.68	0.6	1.65
9	"DNR"	April 26, 2017	0.3/1	0.81	—N/a	—N/a	—N/a	—N/a
10	"Die All, Die Merrily"	May 3, 2017	0.3/1	0.85	0.3	0.54	0.6	1.42
11	"The Other Side"	May 10, 2017	0.3/1	0.86	0.3	0.66	0.6	1.52
12	"The Chosen"	May 17, 2017	0.3/1	0.83	0.2	0.57	0.5	1.40
13	"Praimfaya"	May 24, 2017	0.3/1	0.91	0.3	0.59	0.6	1.50

=== Season 5 ===
Viewership and ratings per episode of List of The 100 episodes
No.	Title	Air date	Rating/share (18–49)	Viewers (millions)	DVR (18–49)	DVR viewers (millions)	Total (18–49)	Total viewers (millions)
1	"Eden"	April 24, 2018	0.4/2	1.43	0.4	0.91	0.8	2.34
2	"Red Queen"	May 1, 2018	0.3/1	1.02	0.4	0.93	0.7	1.95
3	"Sleeping Giants"	May 8, 2018	0.4/2	1.08	0.3	0.89	0.7	1.97
4	"Pandora's Box"	May 15, 2018	0.3/1	1.07	0.4	0.77	0.7	1.84
5	"Shifting Sands"	May 22, 2018	0.3/1	0.94	0.3	0.88	0.6	1.82
6	"Exit Wounds"	June 5, 2018	0.3/1	0.92	0.4	0.94	0.7	1.87
7	"Acceptable Losses"	June 19, 2018	0.3/1	0.83	0.3	0.87	0.6	1.70
8	"How We Get to Peace"	June 26, 2018	0.2/1	0.73	0.4	0.86	0.6	1.59
9	"Sic Semper Tyrannis"	July 10, 2018	0.3/1	0.89	0.3	0.80	0.6	1.69
10	"The Warriors Will"	July 17, 2018	0.2/1	0.86	0.4	0.76	0.6	1.62
11	"The Dark Year"	July 24, 2018	0.3/1	0.85	0.3	0.70	0.6	1.56
12	"Damocles – Part One"	July 31, 2018	0.3/1	0.88	0.2	0.62	0.5	1.50
13	"Damocles – Part Two"	August 7, 2018	0.3/1	0.99	0.3	0.74	0.6	1.73

=== Season 6 ===
Viewership and ratings per episode of List of The 100 episodes
No.	Title	Air date	Rating/share (18–49)	Viewers (millions)	DVR (18–49)	DVR viewers (millions)	Total (18–49)	Total viewers (millions)
1	"Sanctum"	April 30, 2019	0.3/1	0.86	0.3	0.83	0.6	1.69
2	"Red Sun Rising"	May 7, 2019	0.3/1	0.81	0.3	0.76	0.6	1.57
3	"The Children of Gabriel"	May 14, 2019	0.3/1	0.82	0.3	0.75	0.6	1.57
4	"The Face Behind the Glass"	May 21, 2019	0.2/1	0.73	0.3	0.83	0.5	1.56
5	"The Gospel of Josephine"	May 28, 2019	0.2/1	0.73	0.4	0.90	0.6	1.63
6	"Memento Mori"	June 11, 2019	0.2/1	0.64	0.3	0.75	0.5	1.39
7	"Nevermind"	June 18, 2019	0.2/1	0.72	0.3	0.76	0.5	1.48
8	"The Old Man and the Anomaly"	June 25, 2019	0.2/1	0.63	0.3	0.81	0.5	1.44
9	"What You Take With You"	July 9, 2019	0.2/1	0.70	0.3	0.66	0.5	1.36
10	"Matryoshka"	July 16, 2019	0.2/1	0.57	0.3	0.72	0.5	1.29
11	"Ashes to Ashes"	July 23, 2019	0.2/1	0.54	0.3	0.68	0.5	1.22
12	"Adjustment Protocol"	July 30, 2019	0.2/1	0.61	0.3	0.59	0.5	1.20
13	"The Blood of Sanctum"	August 6, 2019	0.2/1	0.59	0.2	0.65	0.4	1.24

=== Season 7 ===
Viewership and ratings per episode of List of The 100 episodes
No.	Title	Air date	Rating (18–49)	Viewers (millions)	DVR (18–49)	DVR viewers (millions)	Total (18–49)	Total viewers (millions)
1	"From the Ashes"	May 20, 2020	0.2	0.80	0.3	0.59	0.5	1.39
2	"The Garden"	May 27, 2020	0.2	0.76	0.2	0.50	0.4	1.26
3	"False Gods"	June 3, 2020	0.2	0.71	0.2	0.61	0.4	1.32
4	"Hesperides"	June 10, 2020	0.2	0.63	0.2	0.53	0.4	1.16
5	"Welcome to Bardo"	June 17, 2020	0.2	0.68	0.2	0.49	0.4	1.17
6	"Nakara"	June 24, 2020	0.1	0.57	0.2	0.52	0.3	1.09
7	"The Queen's Gambit"	July 1, 2020	0.1	0.64	0.2	0.50	0.3	1.14
8	"Anaconda"	July 8, 2020	0.2	0.67	0.2	0.52	0.4	1.19
9	"The Flock"	July 15, 2020	0.2	0.61	0.2	0.50	0.4	1.11
10	"A Little Sacrifice"	August 5, 2020	0.1	0.47	0.2	0.45	0.3	0.92
11	"Etherea"	August 12, 2020	0.1	0.58	0.2	0.51	0.3	1.09
12	"The Stranger"	August 19, 2020	0.1	0.54	0.2	0.43	0.3	0.97
13	"Blood Giant"	September 9, 2020	0.2	0.59	TBD	TBD	TBD	TBD
14	"A Sort of Homecoming"	September 16, 2020	0.2	0.63	TBD	TBD	TBD	TBD
15	"The Dying of the Light"	September 23, 2020	0.1	0.52	TBD	TBD	TBD	TBD
16	"The Last War"	September 30, 2020	0.2	0.61	TBD	TBD	TBD	TBD

=== Summary ===
The 100 : U.S. viewers per episode (millions)

Season	Episode number															
Season	1	2	3	4	5	6	7	8	9	10	11	12	13	14	15	16
1	2.73	2.27	1.90	1.69	1.80	1.97	1.88	1.64	1.73	1.46	1.71	1.58	1.68	–		
2	1.54	1.48	1.68	1.75	1.64	1.86	1.62	1.40	1.48	1.53	1.51	1.36	1.42	1.55	1.49	1.34
3	1.88	1.63	1.57	1.32	1.36	1.41	1.39	1.20	1.23	1.13	1.08	1.15	1.27	1.13	1.17	1.29
4	1.21	1.01	1.05	1.00	1.02	0.98	0.90	0.97	0.81	0.85	0.86	0.83	0.91	–		
5	1.43	1.02	1.08	1.07	0.94	0.92	0.83	0.73	0.89	0.86	0.85	0.88	0.99	–		
6	0.86	0.81	0.82	0.73	0.73	0.64	0.72	0.63	0.70	0.57	0.54	0.61	0.59	–		
7	0.80	0.76	0.71	0.63	0.68	0.57	0.64	0.67	0.61	0.47	0.58	0.54	0.59	0.63	0.52	0.61

Audience measurement performed by Nielsen Media Research
