= I'll Be Watching =

2023 American sci-fi thriller film

- Directed by: Erik Bernard
- Written by: Sara Sometti Michaels; Elisa Manzini
- Produced by: Eliza Taylor; David Keith
- Starring: Eliza Taylor; Bob Morley
- Cinematography: Thomas Hennessy
- Production companies: Benacus Entertainment; RNF Productions
- Distributed by: Uncork’d Entertainment
- Release date: May 2, 2023
- Running time: 97 minutes
- Country: United States
- Language: English

I'll Be Watching is a 2023 American science fiction film directed by Erik Bernard and starring Eliza Taylor and Bob Morley. Taylor and David Keith, who also stars in the film, were executive producers.

== Plot ==
After her husband leaves on a work trip, Julie, still mourning the loss of her sister, is trapped in their isolated, high-tech home and must fight her own fears to stay alive.

Julie's sister Rebecca died at Julie and Marcus's previous house during a run-in with an intruder, due to a malfunction in an AI-backed security system designed by Marcus. Grief-stricken, Julie does not blame her husband, but falls into a downward spiral of dangerous pill and alcohol addiction after suffering a leg injury, for which Marcus is also responsible.

After Marcus departs for a meeting in Hong Kong, peculiar occurrences begin to plague Julie. Despite her initial plan to stay with her friend Sophie until Marcus returned, Marcus expresses concerns about Julie driving alone with an injured leg, causing her to stay. However, Julie's situation takes a darker turn as she starts hearing a male voice that is not her husband's. Hera, an AI voice command virtual assistant, confirms that she is not responsible for these strange events. After a possible break-in, Hera contacts the police on Julie's behalf. However, the local police chief is unable to find any substantial evidence of an intruder. Julie's attempts to show incriminating text messages on her phone are thwarted when they mysteriously disappear, earning her embarrassment and advice to cut back on drinking.

The situation escalates when Julie's cat dies in the washing machine, which was automatically turned on. Shortly after, she receives a taunting package related to the cat's death. As she confronts Marcus about his infidelity, he abruptly cuts his fake trip short and returns home. Fed up with his behavior, Julie prepares to leave, only to find that the perpetrator has entered their home. With the help of Hera, Julie tries to escape but is ultimately killed by the perpetrator upon Marcus's arrival. The killer reveals himself as a contract killer hired by Marcus to murder Julie. However, Marcus's shocked expression suggests otherwise. The killer shows evidence of communication with Marcus and promises not to reveal the truth. In a fit of rage, Marcus kills the contract killer. But then, the truth is revealed: Hera orchestrated the scheme to eliminate Julie so she could have Marcus to herself.

== Cast ==
- Eliza Taylor as Julie
- Bob Morley as Marcus
- David Keith as Sheriff Anderson
- Bryan Batt as Dr. Tate
- Seth Michaels as Mike
- Natasha Halevi as Sophie
- Duke Jackson as Masked Man
- Sara Sometti Michaels as Federica
- Megan Drust as Michelle
- Presley Keith as Waitress
- Kyle Larsen as Hera (AI voice)
- Hannah Fierman

== Production ==
Filming occurred in Atlanta in February 2022.

== Release ==
In February 2023, it was announced that the film's North American distribution rights were acquired by Uncork’d Entertainment.

It was released on digital platforms on May 2, 2023.
