= Eliza Taylor =

Australian actress (born 1989)

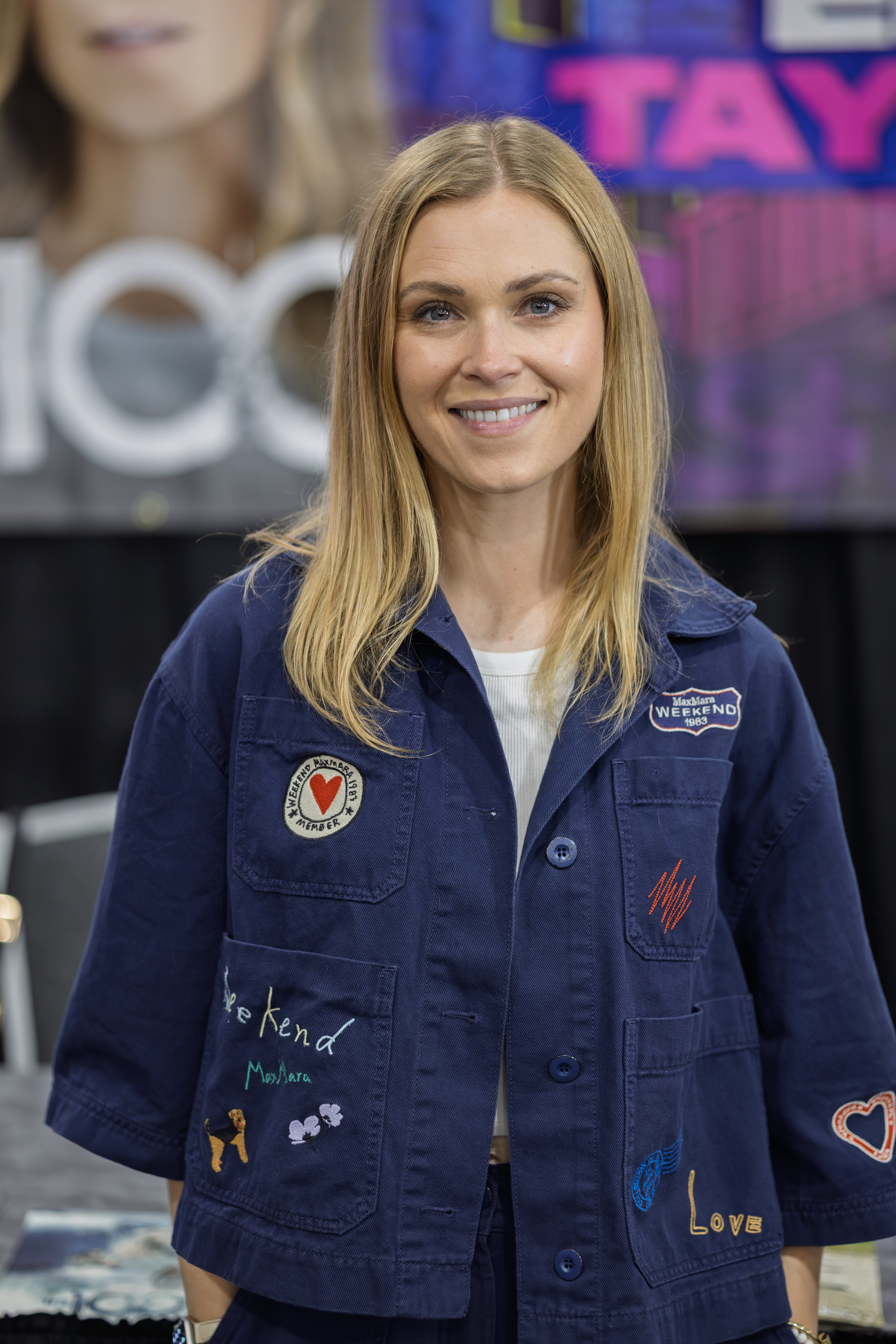
- Taylor at Fandomcon San Jose in April 2026
- Born: Eliza Jane Taylor-Cotter; 24 October 1989 (age 37); Melbourne, Victoria, Australia
- Other name: Eliza Morley
- Occupation: Actress
- Years active: 2003–present
- Known for: Neighbours; The 100; Quantum Leap
- Spouse: Bob Morley (m. 2019)
- Children: 1

Eliza Jane Morley (née Taylor-Cotter; born 24 October 1989), known professionally as Eliza Taylor, is an Australian actress. She is best known for her roles as Janae Timmins on the Australian soap opera drama television series Neighbours (2005–2008), as Clarke Griffin on the dystopian science fiction series The 100 (2014–2020), and as Hannah Carson in the NBC science fiction series Quantum Leap (2022–2024).

== Early life ==
Taylor was born in Melbourne and has two sisters and a brother. Her mother is an author and a graphic designer, her stepfather was a stand-up comedian, and her biological father owned cafés around Melbourne. As a child, she wanted to be a marine biologist.

== Career ==
=== 2003–2013: Career beginnings and Neighbours ===
After a lead role in Pirate Islands, Taylor starred as Rosie Cartwright in The Sleepover Club in 2003. She transitioned to mature audience programs with a guest role on Blue Heelers in 2004.

In 2005, Taylor achieved her breakthrough in the Australian soap opera Neighbours. She secured the role of Janae Timmins after previously appearing in a guest role in 2003. Taylor had originally auditioned for the role of Lana Crawford. In 2007, Nell Feeney and Sianoa Smit-McPhee, who play Taylor's on-screen mother Janelle Timmins and sister Bree Timmins, were written out of the serial. Later that year, Taylor quit the serial and partially attributed her departure to the exits of Feeney and Smit-McPhee, stating that the show "just didn't feel like the family that I joined when I started three years ago". Taylor finished filming her last studio scenes in 2007 and her final episode was screened on 8 February 2008. In 2007, she was nominated for Best Female at the Inside Soap Awards.

She portrayed Snow White in a Christmas pantomime of Snow White from 19 December 2007 to 6 January 2008 in Weymouth Pavilion, England.

Later in 2008, she filmed a short drama-comedy movie called The Laundromat. The film premiered in 2010 at Dungog Film Festival.

In 2009, she appeared in an episode of All Saints, followed by an appearance in the 2010 pilot of Winners & Losers. In 2011, Taylor filmed a role in the horror film 6 Plots. In 2012, Taylor played a nurse in the Australian supernatural horror film, Patrick: Evil Awakens, a remake of the 1978 film of the same name.

=== 2014–2020: The 100 ===
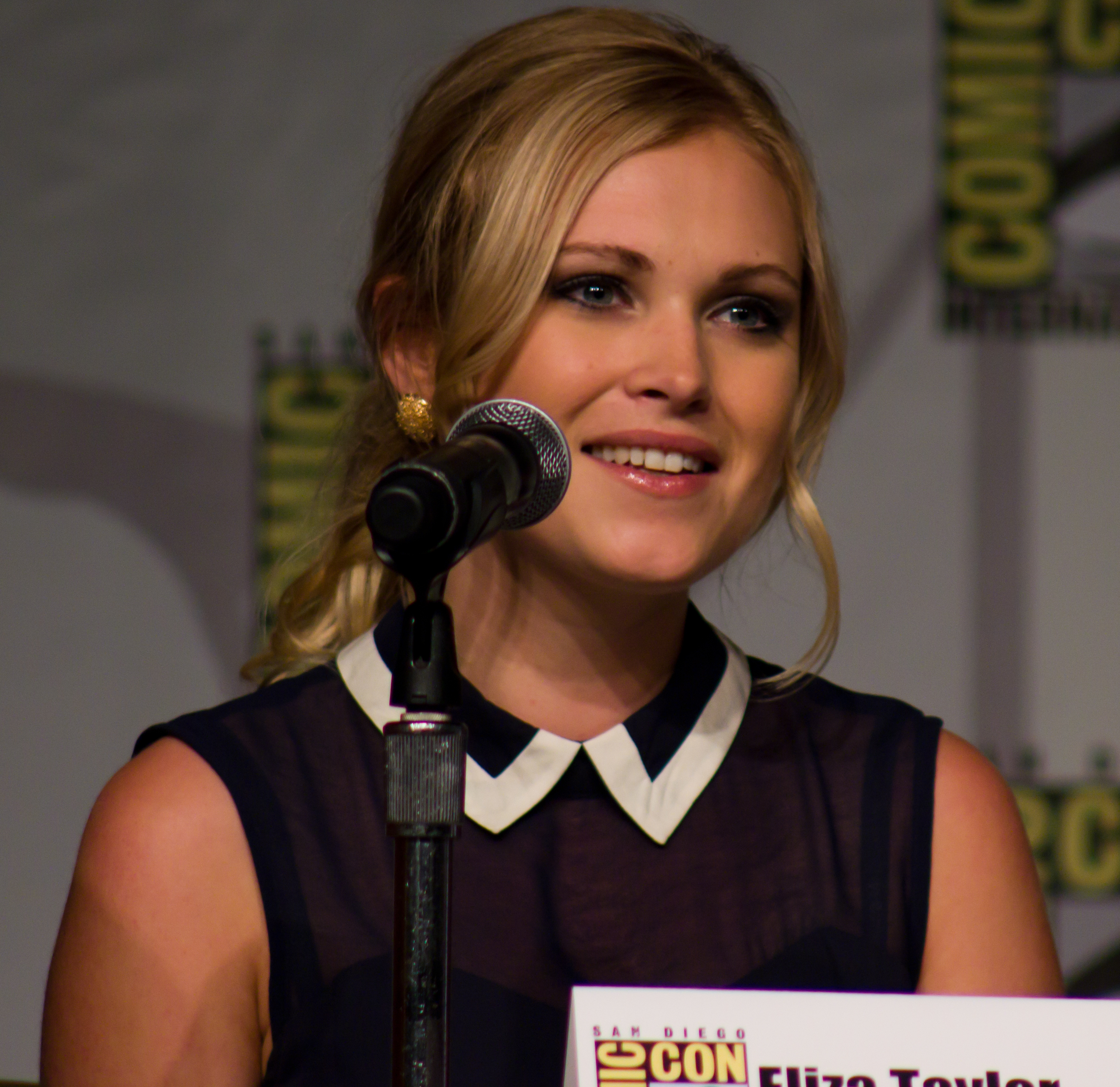
Taylor at the 2013 San Diego Comic-Con for The 100

On 1 March 2013, it was announced that Taylor had been cast as lead character Clarke Griffin in the new post-apocalyptic science fiction drama series The 100 on The CW. The series premiered on Wednesday, 19 March 2014. Explaining how she got the part in the series, Taylor said:

I didn't actually audition. I'd been living in LA for about a month and my credit card was stolen and all my money was taken – spent at Home Depot, which was great – and I was ready to pack my bags and go back to Australia because I didn't know how I was going to survive in LA any longer and then I got a call from my manager to say that an audition I'd done months ago for a film had been looked at by the producers of this TV show called The 100 and they wanted me to go in for a reading the next day. So I read the script that night and loved it and went in for the meeting the next day and got the role. Before I knew it I was on a plane to Vancouver to shoot the pilot and my whole life changed.

In 2014, Taylor starred as Sarah in the thriller film The November Man.

For her role in The 100, Taylor was nominated for Choice TV Actress: Sci-Fi/Fantasy at the Teen Choice Awards from 2015 to 2018.

In 2017, Taylor starred as Kat Carter/Meredith in a thriller-drama film Thumper. The same year, she starred as Ellen Langford in the Netflix Christmas romantic comedy-drama film Christmas Inheritance.

=== 2021–present: Recent work ===
In 2021, Taylor directed two music videos: "Vices" by Sarah and the Sundays, in which she also acted, and "Bad Posture" by Abby Anderson.

In 2022, Taylor appeared in the guest role of Doctor Villka in The Orville episode "From Unknown Graves".

In 2023, Taylor and Morley starred together as Julie and Marcus Alexander in the sci-fi thriller I'll Be Watching, which Taylor executive produced. The same year, Taylor served as an executive producer and starred as Ruby Allen in the independent romantic comedy It Only Takes a Night. Also in 2023, Taylor starred as series regular Hannah Carson in season 2 of Quantum Leap.

In 2025, Taylor and Morley created the short film Status: Active. Morley wrote and directed the film, while Taylor co-produced and starred in it. The film premiered at LA Shorts International Film Festival 2025.

In 2026, Taylor starred together with Caitlin Bassett in The Quiet Cost, a drama-thriller movie. The film is in post-production.

== Personal life ==
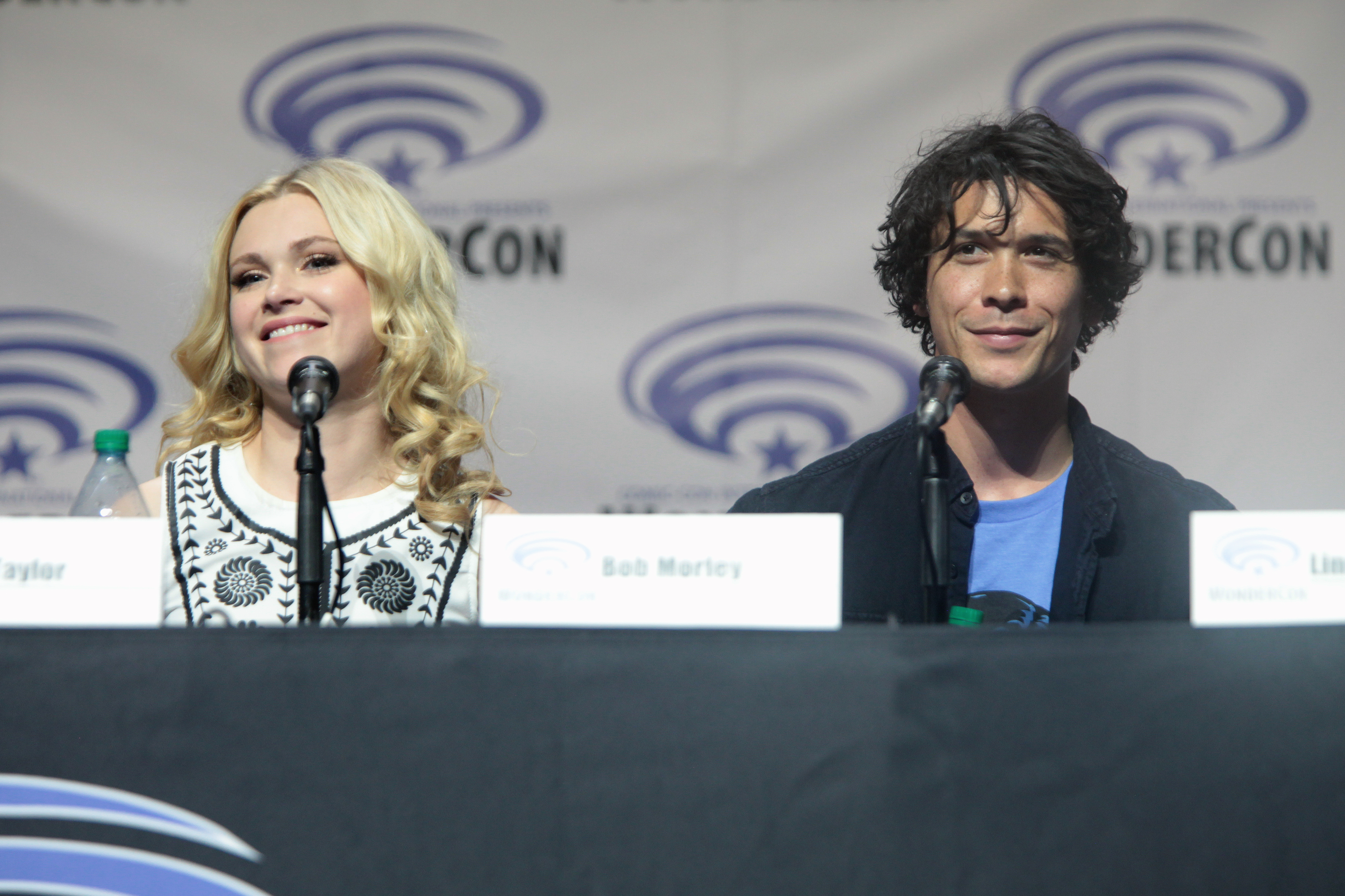
Eliza Taylor and her husband, Bob Morley

On 7 June 2019, Taylor announced on Twitter that she had married Bob Morley, her co-star on The 100. Taylor and Morley were originally set to direct episodes for the seventh and final season of The 100. However, Taylor was unable to direct her episode due to suffering from a miscarriage.

On 20 March 2022, they announced the birth of their son.

In a 2024 interview with Tommy DiDario on his I’ve Never Said This Before podcast, Taylor discussed her year-long struggle with postpartum depression.

== Filmography ==
=== Film ===
Year	Title	Role	Notes
2010	The Laundromat	Amy	Short film, drama-comedy
2012	6 Plots	Amy Challis	
2013	Patrick: Evil Awakens	Nurse Panicale	
2014	The November Man	Sarah	
2017	Thumper	Kat Carter/Meredith	
2017	Christmas Inheritance	Ellen Langford	
2023	I'll Be Watching	Julie Alexander	Executive producer
2023	It Only Takes a Night	Ruby Allen	Executive producer
2025	Status: Active	Kaitlyn	Short film, Co-producer
TBA	The Quiet Cost	Lily Jackson	Drama-thriller, In post-production

=== Television ===
Year	Title	Role	Notes
2003	Pirate Islands	Sarah Redding	Main role
2003	Neighbours	Jacinta Martin	2 episodes
2003	The Sleepover Club	Rosie Cartwright	Main role, season 1
2004	Blue Heelers	Tatum O'Hara	Episode: "Cast the First Stone"
2005–2008	Neighbours	Janae Timmins	Main role
2006	Blue Water High	Heidi Lee (uncredited)	Episode 35
2008	Rush	Madison Taylor Hume	Episode: "Get Lucky"
2009	Packed to the Rafters	Kerry	Episode: "Losing the Touch"
2009	All Saints	Carly Spalding	Episode: "The Two of Us"
2010	City Homicide	Melissa Standish	Episode: "Last Seen"
2012	Howzat! Kerry Packer's War	Rhonda	1 episode
2013	Mr & Mrs Murder	Sarah	Episode: "Little Boxes"
2014–2020	The 100	Clarke Griffin	Main role, 98 episodes
2019	The 100	Josephine Lightbourne VIII	Main role, 7 episodes
2022	The Orville	Doctor Villka	Episode: "From Unknown Graves"
2023–2024	Quantum Leap	Hannah Carson	Main role, 7 episodes

=== Director ===
Year	Title	Artist	Notes	Ref.
2021	Vices	Sarah & the Sundays	Music video	
2021	Bad Posture	Abby Anderson	Music video	
TBA	Reruns	Eliza Taylor, Melisa Bergland, Bob Morley	Short film, in post-production	TBA

== Theatre ==
Year	Title	Role	Notes	Ref.
2007	Snow White & The Seven Dwarfs Pantomime	Snow White	Snow White & The Seven Dwarfs in Weymouth Pavilion, England	

== Awards and nominations ==
Year	Award	Category	Nominated work	Result	Ref.
2007	Inside Soap Awards	Best Actress	Neighbours	Nominated	
2008	Inside Soap Awards	Sexiest Female	Neighbours	Nominated	
2015	Teen Choice Awards	Choice TV Actress: Sci-Fi/Fantasy	The 100	Nominated	
2015	MTV Fandom Awards	Ship of the Year (shared with Alycia Debnam-Carey)	The 100	Nominated	
2016	Teen Choice Awards	Choice TV Actress: Sci-Fi/Fantasy	The 100	Nominated	
2016	Teen Choice Awards	Choice TV: Chemistry (shared with Bob Morley)	The 100	Nominated	
2016	MTV Fandom Awards	Ship of the Year (shared with Alycia Debnam-Carey)	The 100	Nominated	
2017	Teen Choice Awards	Choice Sci-Fi/Fantasy TV Actress	The 100	Nominated	
2018	Teen Choice Awards	Choice Sci-Fi/Fantasy TV Actress	The 100	Nominated	
